= Wandering Girls =

1927 film

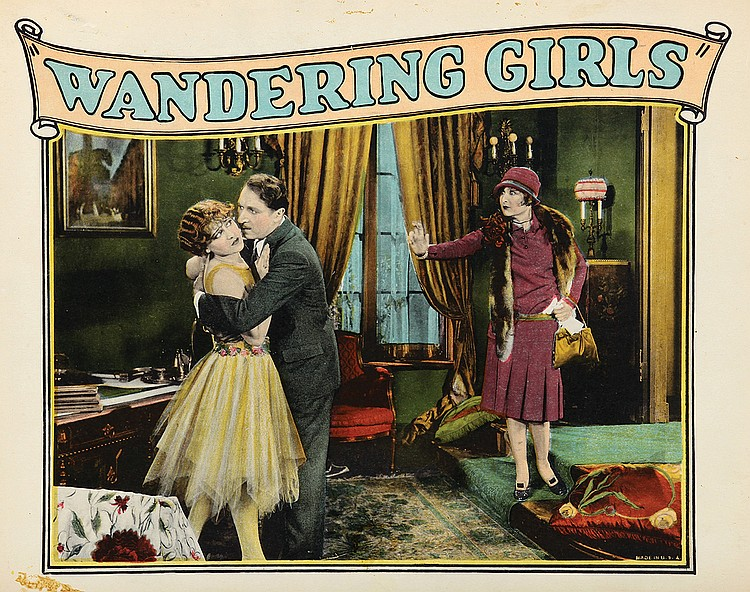
- Directed by: Ralph Ince
- Written by: Dorothy Howell; Harry O. Hoyt
- Cinematography: J.O. Taylor
- Production company: Columbia Pictures
- Distributed by: Columbia Pictures
- Release date: January 20, 1927
- Running time: 58 minutes
- Country: United States
- Languages: Silent; English intertitles

Wandering Girls is a 1927 American silent film directed by Ralph Ince and starring Dorothy Revier, Eugenie Besserer and Frances Raymond.

== Cast ==
- Dorothy Revier as Peggy Marston
- Eugenie Besserer as Peggy's Mother
- Frances Raymond as Mrs. Arnold
- Robert Agnew as Jerry Arnold
- William Welsh as James Marston
- Armand Kaliz as Maurice Dumond
- Mildred Harris as Maxine

== Preservation and status ==
A complete copy of the film is held at the La Corse Et Le Cinéma.

== Bibliography ==
- Quinlan, David. The Illustrated Guide to Film Directors. Batsford, 1983.
