= Not for Publication =

Not for Publication may refer to:

- Not for Publication (1927 film), an American silent film
- Not for Publication (1984 film), a screwball comedy film
- Not for Publication (TV series), an American crime drama TV series
