= Danger Street =

Danger Street could refer to:

- Danger Street (1928 film), a 1928 American film directed by Ralph Ince
- Danger Street (1947 film), a 1947 American film directed by Lew Landers
- Danger Street, a comic book published by DC Comics under their DC Black Label imprint
