= Bigger Than Barnum's =

1926 film

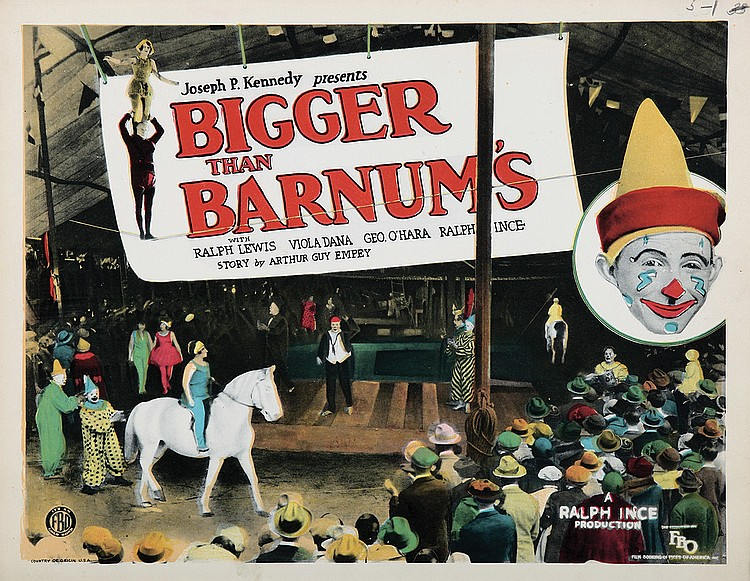
- Directed by: Ralph Ince
- Written by: J. Grubb Alexander; Arthur Guy Empey
- Cinematography: J.O. Taylor
- Production company: Robertson-Cole Pictures Corporation
- Distributed by: Film Booking Offices of America
- Release date: August 15, 1926
- Running time: 6 reels
- Country: United States
- Language: Silent (English intertitles)

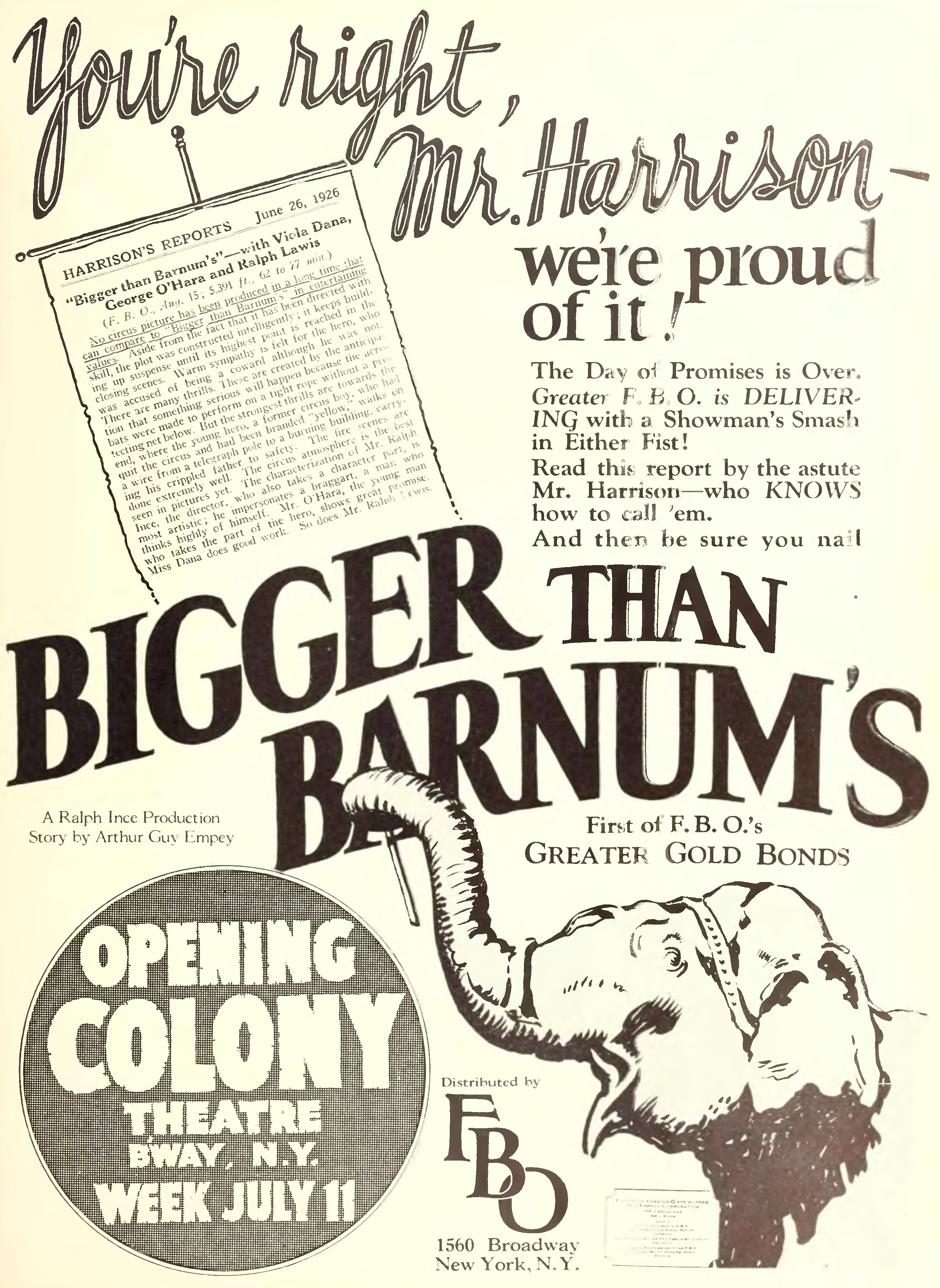
Bigger Than Barnum's ad in Motion Picture News, 1926

Bigger Than Barnum's is a 1926 American silent drama film directed by Ralph Ince and starring Ralph Lewis, George O'Hara, and Viola Dana.

== Cast ==
- Ralph Lewis as Peter Blandin
- George O'Hara as Robert Blandim
- Viola Dana as Juanita Calles
- Ralph Ince as Carl Ravelle
- Lucille Mendez as Princess Bonita
- Daniel Makarenko as Jack Ranglin
- George Holt as Bill Hartnett
- William Knight as Ringmaster
- Rhody Hathaway as Doctor

== Preservation ==
With no prints of Bigger Than Barnum's located in any film archives, it is a lost film.

== Bibliography ==
- Quinlan, David. The Illustrated Guide to Film Directors. Batsford, 1983.
