= My Lady's Slipper =

1916 film by Ralph Ince

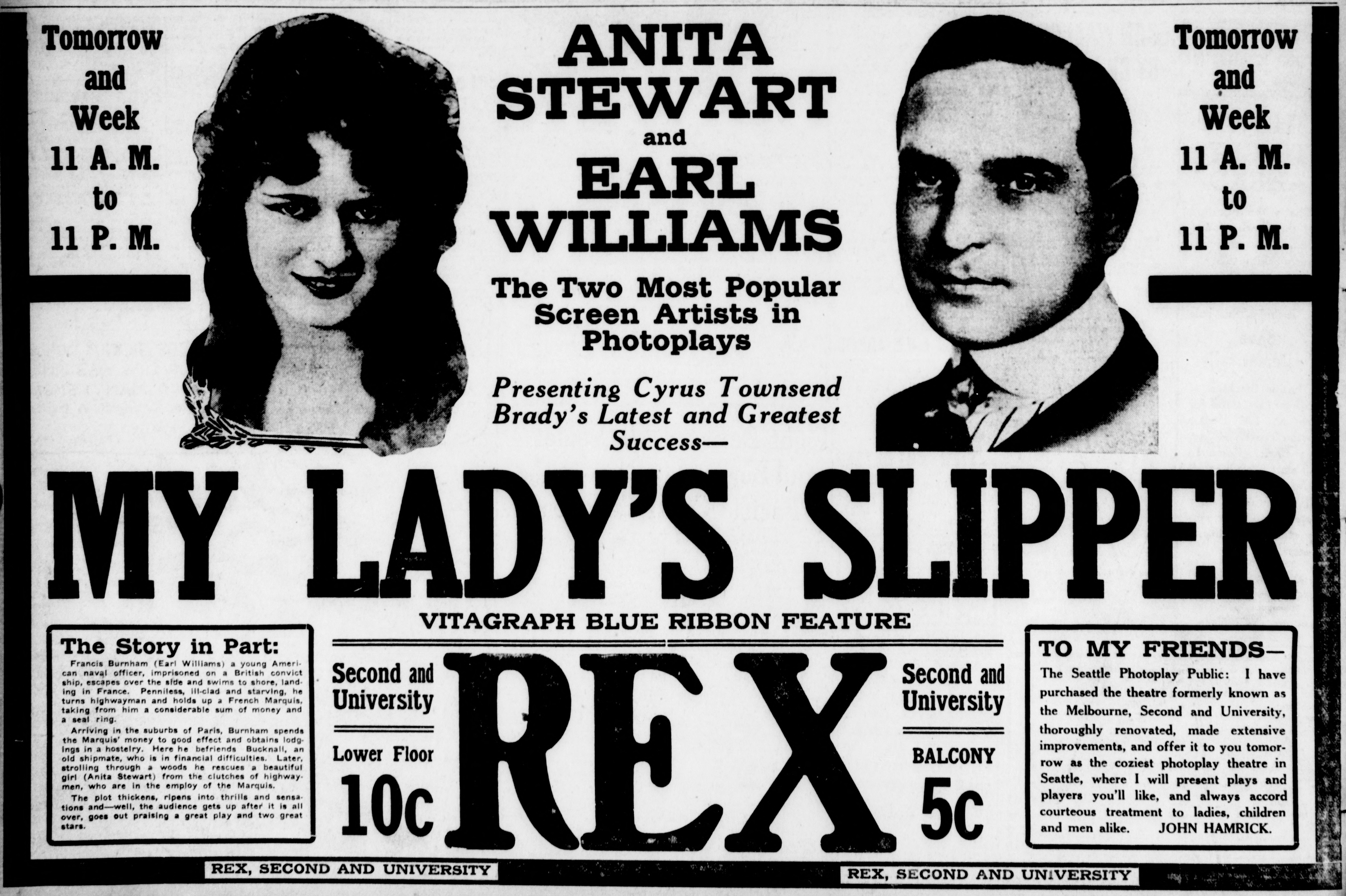
- Newspaper advertisement
- Directed by: Ralph Ince
- Written by: J. E. Brady; Edward J. Montague
- Based on: story by Cyrus Townsend Brady
- Produced by: Vitagraph
- Starring: Anita Stewart; Earle Williams
- Production company: Vitagraph
- Distributed by: V-L-S-E
- Release date: January 10, 1916
- Running time: 5 reels
- Country: USA
- Language: Silent (English intertitles)

My Lady's Slipper is a lost 1916 silent film romance-drama directed by Ralph Ince and starring Anita Stewart and Earle Williams.

== Cast ==
- Anita Stewart - Countess de Villars
- Earle Williams - Lt. Francis Burnham
- Joseph Kilgour - King Louis XVI
- Julia Swayne Gordon - Marie Antoinette
- Harry Northrup - Marquis du Tremignon
- George O'Donnell - duc de Riveau-Huet
- Albert Roccardi - Bucknall
- Charles Chapman - Benjamin Franklin
- George Stevens - Espiau
- William Shea - Bucknail (uncredited)
