= The House of Youth =

1924 film

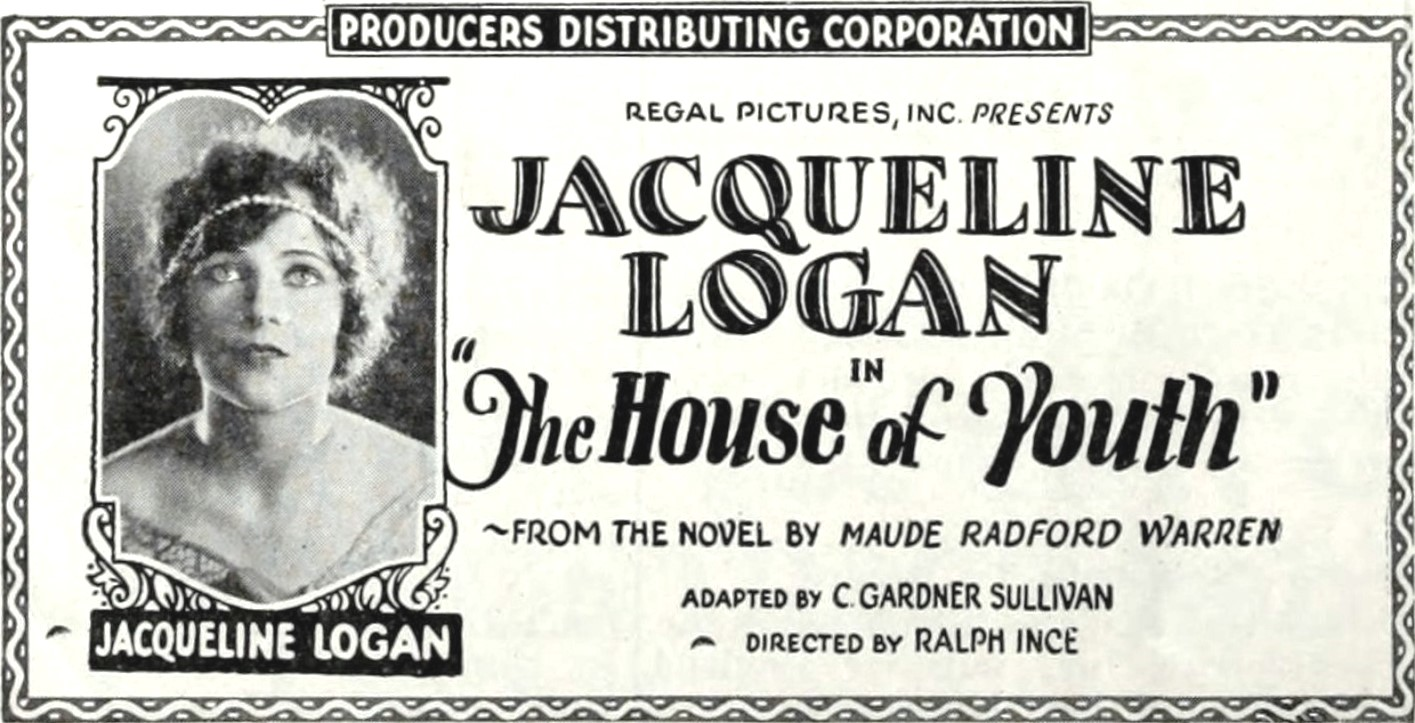
- Directed by: Ralph Ince
- Written by: Maude Radford Warren (novel); C. Gardner Sullivan
- Starring: Jacqueline Logan; Malcolm McGregor; Gloria Grey
- Cinematography: J.O. Taylor
- Production company: Regal Pictures
- Distributed by: Producers Distributing Corporation
- Release date: October 19, 1924
- Running time: 70 minutes
- Country: United States
- Languages: Silent; English intertitles

The House of Youth is a 1924 American silent drama film directed by Ralph Ince and starring Jacqueline Logan, Malcolm McGregor and Gloria Grey.

== Cast ==
- Jacqueline Logan as Corinna Endicott
- Malcolm McGregor as Spike Blaine
- Vernon Steele as Rhodes Winston
- Gloria Grey as Amy Marsden
- Richard Travers as Mitch Hardy
- Rosa Castro as Linda Richards
- Edwin B. Tilton as Cornelius Endicott
- Aileen Manning as Aunt Maggie Endicott
- Hugh Metcalfe as Butler
- Barbara Tennant as Mrs. Mitch Hardy
- Nola Luxford as Society Girl

== Bibliography ==
- Connelly, Robert B. The Silents: Silent Feature Films, 1910-36, Volume 40, Issue 2. December Press, 1998.
- Munden, Kenneth White. The American Film Institute Catalog of Motion Pictures Produced in the United States, Part 1. University of California Press, 1997.
