= Yellow Fingers =

1926 film

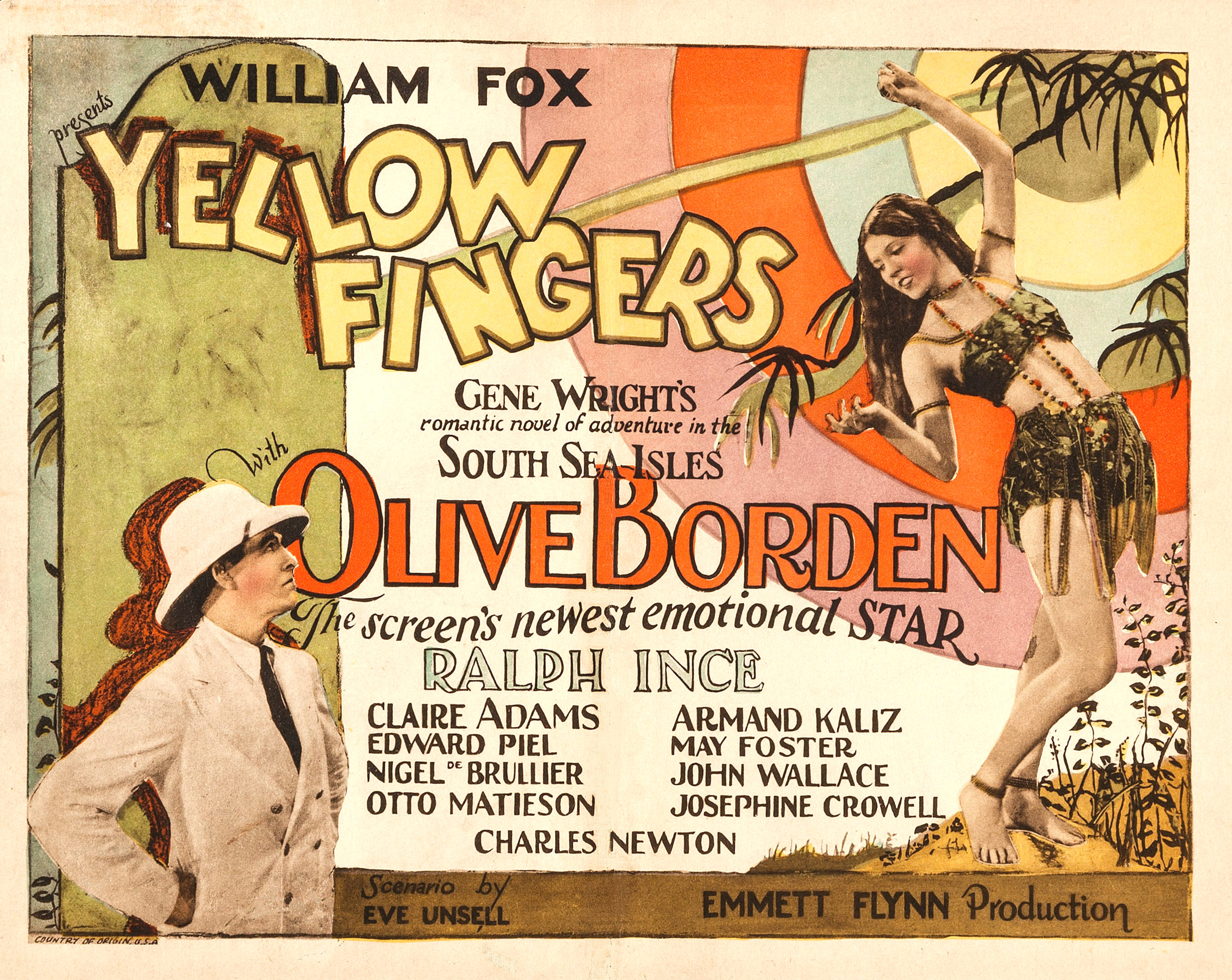
- Lobby card
- Directed by: Emmett J. Flynn
- Screenplay by: Eve Unsell (scenario)
- Based on: Yellow Fingers by Gene Wright
- Starring: Olive Borden; Ralph Ince; Claire Adams; Edward Peil, Sr.
- Cinematography: Paul Ivano; Ernest Palmer
- Production company: Fox Film Corporation
- Distributed by: Fox Film Corporation
- Release date: March 21, 1926
- Running time: 60 minutes
- Country: United States
- Language: Silent (English intertitles)

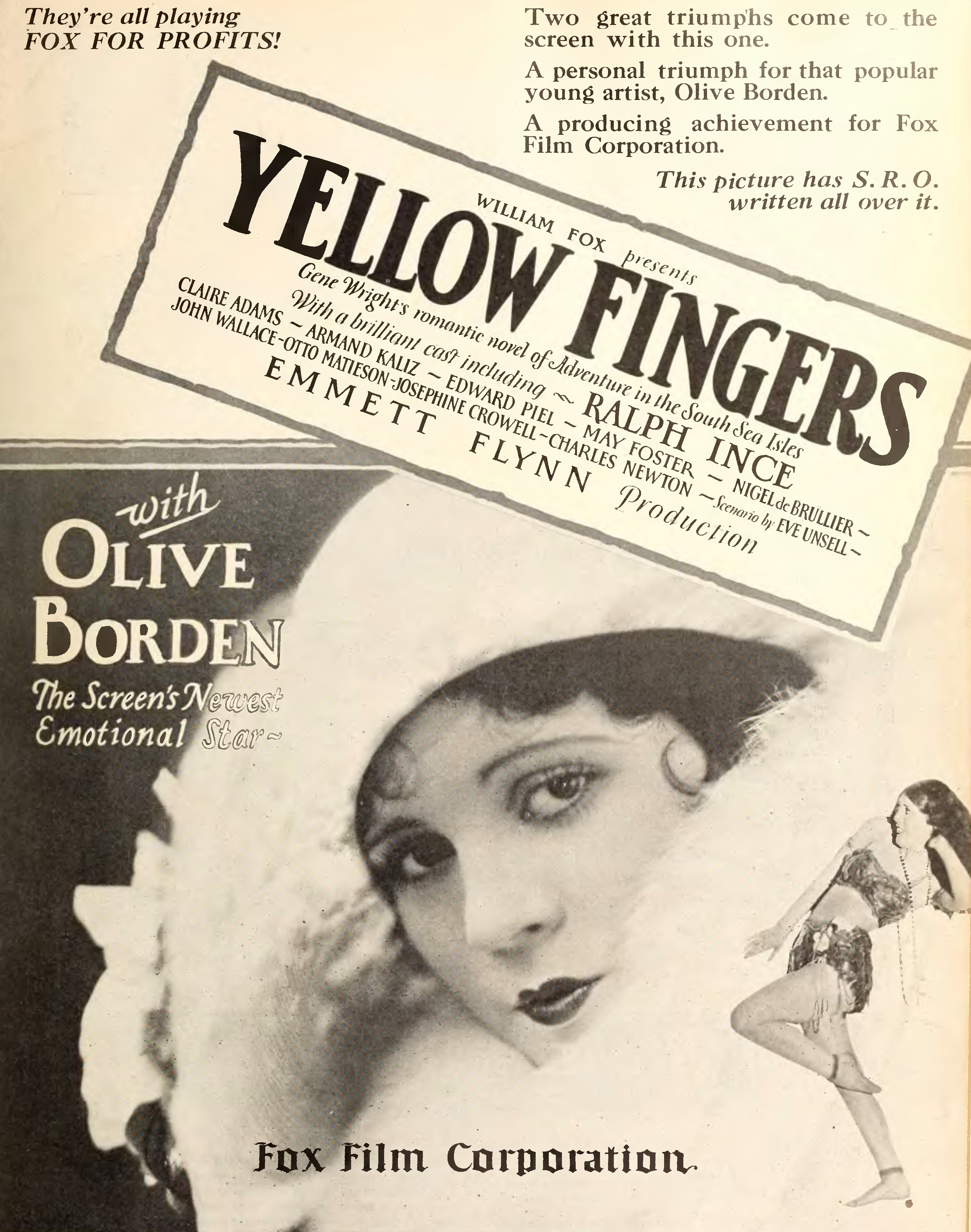
Yellow Fingers ad in Motion Picture News, 1926

Yellow Fingers is a 1926 American silent drama film directed by Emmett J. Flynn and written by Eve Unsell. The film stars Olive Borden, Ralph Ince, Claire Adams, Edward Peil, Sr., Otto Matieson, and Nigel De Brulier. The film was released on March 21, 1926, by Fox Film Corporation.

== Plot ==
As described in a film magazine review, Captain Shane, a South Seas trader, known on the island as "Brute" Shane due to the roughhouse methods he uses on his men and native islanders, rears Saina, a half-caste, as if she was a young white woman. Now grown to womanhood, Saina has come to love her guardian. Nona, an English damsel, stows away on Shane's ship to escape Kwong Li, a Chinese man who desires her. When Saina finds that Shane loves Nona and learns the secret circumstances of her birth, she temporarily reverts to native ways, and even performs a native dance in traditional islander clothing with grace and abandon. Saina turns out to be the Rajah's granddaughter and a hereditary queen of the island. Shane sails away with Nona.

== Cast ==
- Olive Borden as Saina
- Ralph Ince as Brute Shane
- Claire Adams as Nona Deering
- Edward Peil, Sr. as Kwong Li
- Otto Matieson as Kario
- Nigel De Brulier as Rajah Jagore
- Armand Kaliz as De Vries
- Josephine Crowell as Mrs. Van Kronk
- May Foster as Toinette
- John Wallace as Pegleg LaForge
- Charles Newton as Higgins

== Preservation ==
Yellow Fingers is preserved with a copy located in Europe.
