= Wet Gold (1921 film) =

1921 film

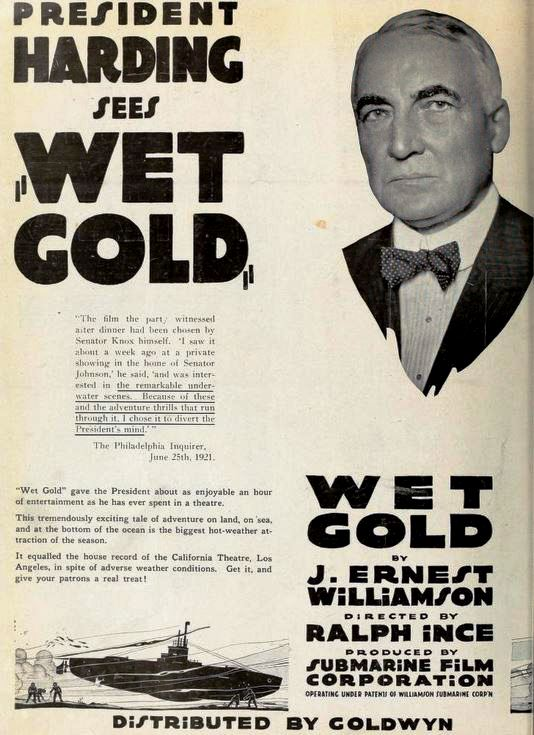
- Advertisement
- Directed by: Ralph Ince
- Written by: J. Ernest Williamson
- Produced by: J. Ernest Williamson
- Cinematography: William J. Black; Jay Rescher
- Production company: Submarine Film Corporation
- Distributed by: Goldwyn Pictures
- Release date: June 1921
- Running time: 6 reels
- Country: United States
- Language: Silent (English intertitles)

Wet Gold is a 1921 American silent drama film directed by and starring Ralph Ince.

== Plot ==
The film features pirates, a race for buried treasure, and a submarine. The protagonist learns about the treasure from the pirates, who are promptly and conveniently killed in an accident. The second part of the film starts in Havana, Cuba where the protagonist reveals the location of the treasure to others, who split up and race to get it. When they arrive at the undersea location where the treasure is, the separate groups fight, with the protagonist eventually being victorious.

== Cast ==
- Ralph Ince as John Cromwell
- Aleen Burr as Grace Hamilton
- Alicia Turner as Susan
- Harry McNaughton as 'Arry
- Tom Magrane as Colonel Hamilton
- John Butler as Chubby Madison
- Charles McNaughton as James Chipman

== Bibliography ==
- Krista A. Thompson. An Eye for the Tropics: Tourism, Photography, and Framing the Caribbean Picturesque. Duke University Press, 2007.
