= Remember (1926 film) =

1926 film directed by David Selman

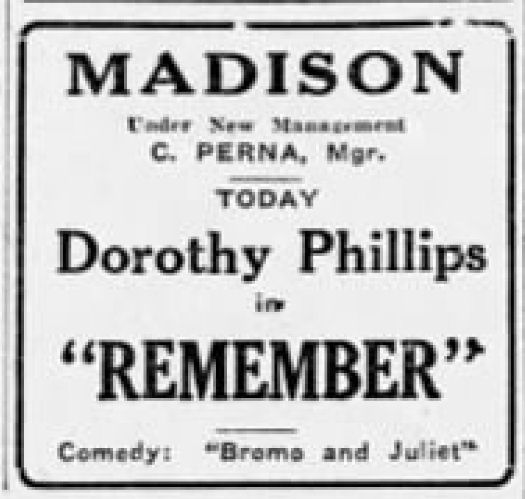
- Newspaper advertisement
- Directed by: David Selman
- Screenplay by: J. Grubb Alexander
- Story by: Dorothy Howell
- Produced by: Harry Cohn
- Starring: Dorothy Phillips; Earl Metcalfe; Lola Todd
- Cinematography: J. O. Taylor
- Production company: Columbia Pictures Corporation
- Release date: December 20, 1926 (US)
- Running time: 6 reels
- Country: United States
- Language: Silent (English intertitles)

Remember is a 1926 American silent drama film directed by David Selman and written by J. Grubb Alexander from a story by Dorothy Howell. It stars Dorothy Phillips, Earl Metcalfe, and Lola Todd. It was released on December 20, 1926.

== Cast list ==
- Dorothy Phillips as Ruth Pomeroy
- Earl Metcalfe as Jimmy Cardigan
- Lola Todd as Constance Pomeroy
- Lincoln Stedman as Slim Dugan
- Eddie Fetherstone as Billy (credited as Eddie Featherstone)

== Preservation and status ==
Incomplete copies of the film are held at the Library of Congress and the Academy Film Archive.
