= The Border Whirlwind =

1926 film

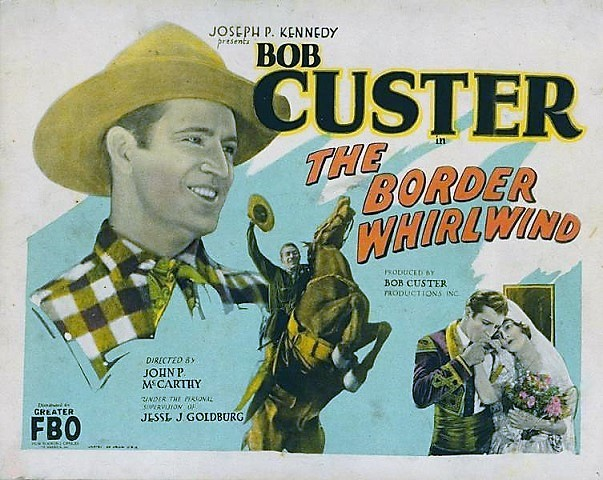
- Lobby card
- Directed by: John P. McCarthy
- Screenplay by: Enid Hibbard
- Story by: James Ormont
- Produced by: Jesse J. Goldburg
- Starring: Bob Custer; Sally Long; Josef Swickard; Wilbur Higby; Winifred Landis; Philip Sleeman
- Cinematography: Ernest Miller
- Production company: Independent Pictures
- Distributed by: Film Booking Offices of America
- Release date: November 15, 1926
- Running time: 50 minutes
- Country: United States
- Language: Silent (English intertitles)

The Border Whirlwind is a 1926 American silent Western film directed by John P. McCarthy and written by Enid Hibbard. The film stars Bob Custer, Sally Long, Josef Swickard, Wilbur Higby, Winifred Landis, and Philip Sleeman. The film was released on November 15, 1926, by Film Booking Offices of America.

== Cast ==
- Bob Custer as Tom Blake Jr.
- Sally Long as Isabella Cordova
- Josef Swickard as Señor Jose Cordova
- Wilbur Higby as Tom Blake Sr.
- Winifred Landis as Mrs. Blake
- Philip Sleeman as Palo
- Bobby Nelson as Petie
- Julian Rivero as Captain Gonzales
- Evelyn Sherman as The Dueña

== Preservation ==
With no holdings located in archives, The Border Whirlwind is considered a lost film.
