= The Empty Gun =

1917 film

- Directed by: Joe De Grasse
- Written by: J. Grubb Alexander; Fred Myton
- Produced by: Gold Seal Films
- Starring: Lon Chaney; Claire McDowell
- Distributed by: Universal Pictures
- Release date: September 4, 1917
- Running time: 3 reels (30 minutes)
- Country: United States
- Languages: Silent; English intertitles

The Empty Gun is a 1917 American silent Western film directed by Joe De Grasse and featuring Lon Chaney and Claire McDowell. It was distributed by Universal Pictures. The film was reissued theatrically on April 29, 1921. This was the last short film Chaney made; every film he made after this was a full-length feature. A still exists showing Lon Chaney in the role of Frank, which see.

== Plot ==
Frank travels through a terrible storm to deposit $10,000 in gold from his mine with the station agent. The man refuses to accept responsibility for so much gold since some suspicious bums have been hanging about the area, and the next train is hours away. Frank goes home with the gold, planning to hide it there.

Mary, Frank's wife, was once in love with a man named Jim, but through deceit, Frank convinced her to marry him instead and forsake Jim. Her life has been miserable ever since, and Frank actually mocks her when he comes home every day and finds her crying again. They live in a rundown shack and he works the poor woman like a scullery maid.

After concealing the gold in his shack, Frank goes out carousing, and a stranger who is caught in the storm knocks on the door and begs Mary for shelter. Mary is afraid at first and picks up her husband's pistol, even though she knows he always keeps it unloaded. The stranger turns out to be her ex-fiancé Jim, and both he and Mary are happy to be reunited again. Jim finds Mary toying with Frank's empty revolver and he shows Mary how to load the gun. Jim learns from Mary how Frank tricked her into breaking up their engagement, and he decides to settle the score with Frank once and for all, going off to look for the scoundrel.

Meanwhile, Frank is waylaid by the two suspicious vagrants the station agent mentioned and, after he overpowers them, he switches clothes with one of the bums, to disguise himself in case there are other criminals lying in wait. When Frank later enters his cabin, the wind extinguishes the lamp. Mary does not recognize Frank in the tramp's clothing and tells him to keep back or she'll shoot. Frank laughs, assuming the gun is empty, and attacks her. Mary shoots but misses. Jim returns to the cabin and, seeing the struggle, grapples with Frank. Mary shoots the stranger dead, and then she and Jim realize she has killed her husband Frank. "It is the judgement of the Highest Court," says Jim.

== Cast ==
- Franklyn Farnum as Robber
- Claire McDowell as Mary
- Lon Chaney as Frank
- Sam De Grasse as Jim

== Reception ==
Like many American films of the time, The Empty Gun was subject to cuts by city and state film censorship boards. The Chicago Board of Censors required a cut of a scene of the woman shooting the husband. There are no critical reviews to be found on this film in the usual Lon Chaney reference sources.
