= The Stolen Bride (1927 film) =

1927 film

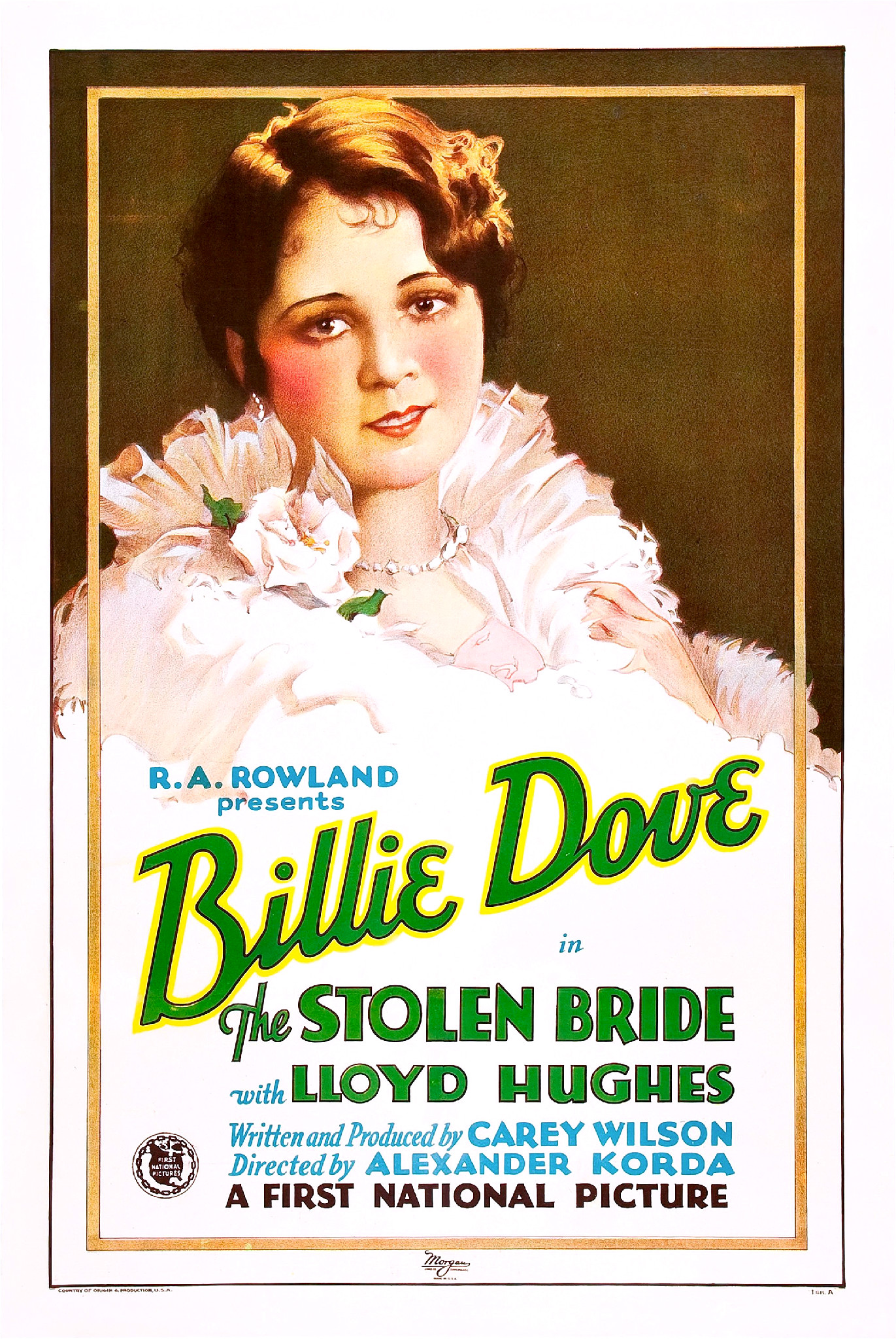
- Film poster
- Directed by: Alexander Korda
- Written by: Carey Wilson
- Produced by: Carey Wilson
- Starring: Billie Dove; Lloyd Hughes; Armand Kaliz; Frank Beal
- Cinematography: Robert Kurrle
- Production company: First National Pictures
- Distributed by: First National Pictures
- Release date: August 14, 1927
- Running time: 8 reels
- Country: United States
- Language: Silent (English intertitles)

The Stolen Bride is a 1927 American silent drama film directed by Alexander Korda and starring Billie Dove, Lloyd Hughes, and Armand Kaliz. The film is a Hungarian-set romance across classes, where an aristocrat and a peasant fall in love.

== Cast ==
- Billie Dove as Sari, Countess Thurzo
- Lloyd Hughes as Franz Pless
- Armand Kaliz as Baron von Heimburg
- Frank Beal as Count Thurzo
- Lilyan Tashman as Ilona Taznadi
- Cleve Moore as Lt. Kiss
- Otto Hoffman as Papa Pless
- Charles Wellesley as The Regiment Pater
- Bert Sprotte as Sergeant
- Paul Vincenti
- Patty Falkenstein as The Little Princess (uncredited)

== Production ==
The production was Korda's first Hollywood film after moving to America from Berlin where he had previously been working. Korda was assigned the film in large part because he was a native of Hungary, where the film's action is set. It was shot at the Burbank Studios of First National Pictures during the summer of 1927. It was a moderate success once it was released in August 1927. It was released in Britain on May 28, 1928. Korda's next film was the far more successful The Private Life of Helen of Troy.

== Preservation ==
A print of The Stolen Bride is reportedly held in a foreign archive.

== Bibliography ==
- Kulik, Karol. Alexander Korda: The Man Who Could Work Miracles. Virgin Books, 1990.
