= Coney Island (1928 film) =

1928 film

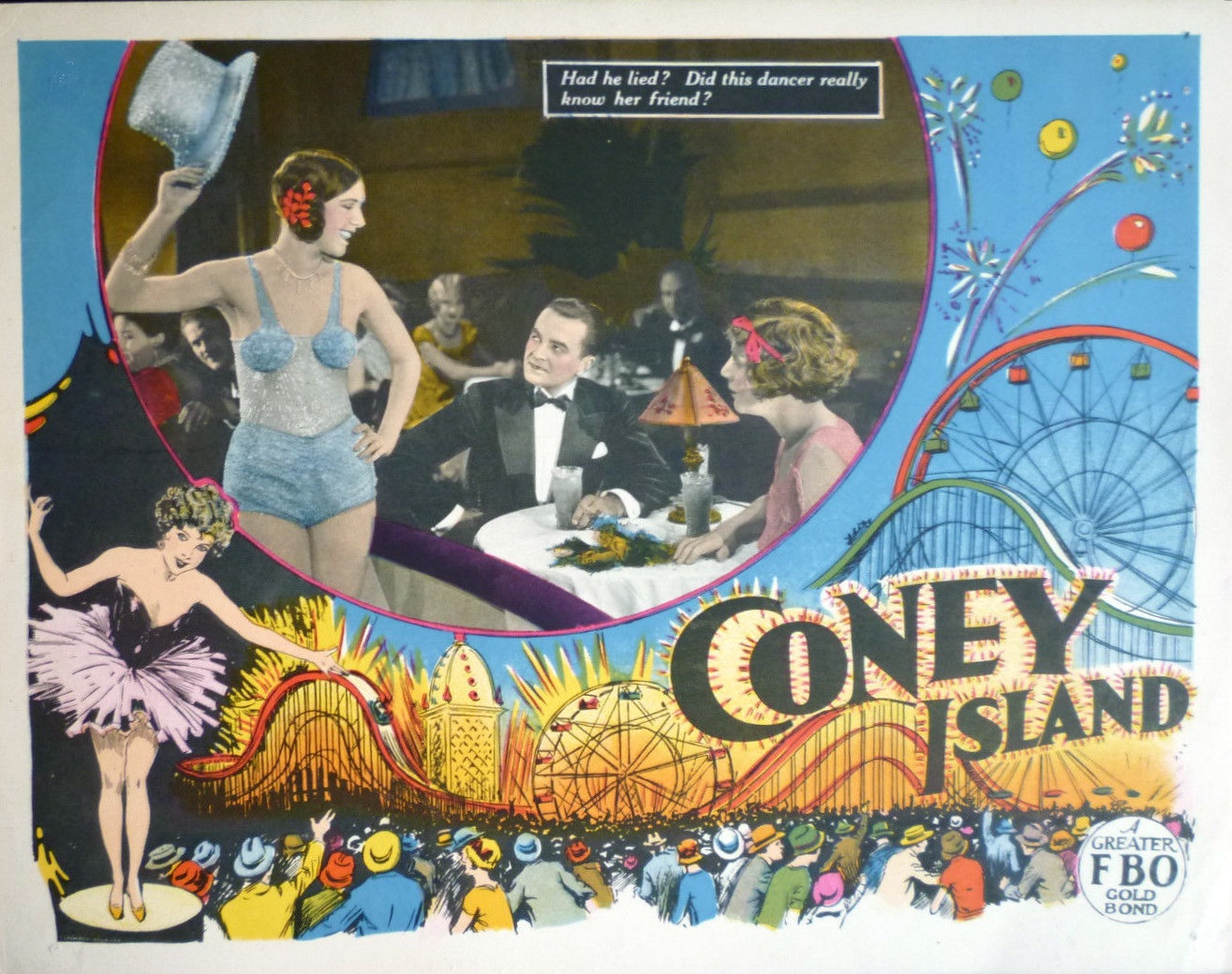
- Lobby card
- Directed by: Ralph Ince
- Written by: Maxine Alton; Adele Buffington; John W. Conway; Dorothy Herzog; Enid Hibbard; Joseph Jefferson O'Neil
- Starring: Lois Wilson; Lucilla Mendez; Eugene Strong
- Cinematography: Robert Martin; J.O. Taylor
- Edited by: George M. Arthur
- Production company: Film Booking Offices of America (FBO)
- Distributed by: FBO
- Release date: January 13, 1928
- Running time: 7 reels
- Country: United States
- Language: Silent (English intertitles)

Coney Island is a 1928 American silent drama film directed by Ralph Ince and starring Lois Wilson, Lucille Mendez, and Eugene Strong. Its survival status is listed as unknown, which suggests that it is a lost film.

== Cast ==
- Lois Wilson as Joan Wellman
- Lucille Mendez as Joy Carroll
- Eugene Strong as Tammany Burke
- Rudolph Cameron as Bob Wainwright
- William Irving as Hughey Cooper
- Gus Leonard as Jingles Wellman
- Orlo Sheldon as Cooper's Aide
- Carl Axzelle as Grimes

== Bibliography ==
- Quinlan, David. The Illustrated Guide to Film Directors. Batsford, 1983.
