= Armand Kaliz =

American actor

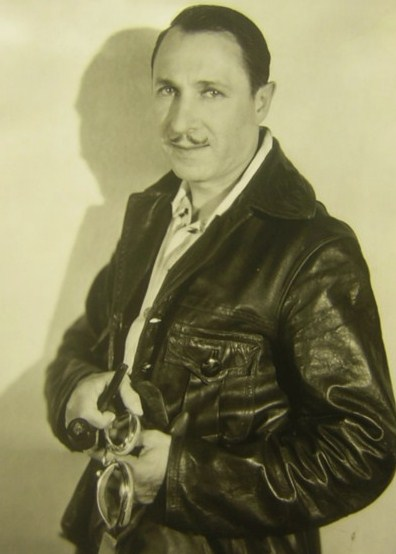
- Kaliz in The Aviator (1929)
- Born: Armand David Kalisz; October 23, 1882; Warsaw, Poland
- Died: February 1, 1941 (aged 58); Beverly Hills, California, U.S.
- Other name: Armand Kalisz
- Occupation: Film actor
- Years active: 1917–1941
- Spouses: Madeline Hatch Weiner (m. 1931); Amelia Stone (1910–?, divorced)

Armand David Kali(s)z (October 23, 1882 or 1883 – February 1, 1941) was an American stage and film actor of the silent film and early sound period of the 1930s. Prior to that, he was an actor in vaudeville and on the legitimate stage.

== Career ==
Born in Warsaw, Poland, Kaliz was a headliner in vaudeville.

He arrived in the United States in September 1907, having sailed from Southampton to New York on the S/S St. Louis. His Broadway debut came in The Hoyden (1907). His other plays on Broadway included The Kiss Burglar (1918) and Spice of 1922 (1922).

He appeared in films such as The Temptress (1926) with actresses such as Greta Garbo, making some 82 film appearances between 1917 and 1941. After 1933, the majority of his small roles in films went uncredited.

== Liquor dealing ==
A United Press article published in 1939 described Kaliz as "one of the leading wholesale liquor dealers in the West." He became involved with the business after the repeal of Prohibition when he was a wine taster for an importer.

== Personal life ==
In April 1910 he married his first wife actress Amelia Stone (1882–1966). In 1931, Kaliz married Madeline Hatch Weiner, an actress from a wealthy family in New York. Kaliz died on February 1, 1941, in Beverly Hills Emergency Hospital, from a heart attack.

== Partial filmography ==
- The Siren (1917) - Armand
- Innocent (1918) - Louis Doucet
- Let's Get a Divorce (1918) - Adhemar
- The Yellow Ticket (1918) - Count Rostov
- The Zero Hour (1918) - Esau Brand
- A Temperamental Wife (1919) - Countt Tosoff de Zoolac
- Yellow Fingers (1926) - De Vries
- The Belle of Broadway (1926) - Count Raoul de Parma
- The Temptress (1926) - Marquis de Torre Bianca
- Josselyn's Wife (1926) - Pierre Marchand
- The Better Way (1926) - Stock Broker
- Wandering Girls (1927) - Maurice Dumond
- Say It with Diamonds (1927) - Armand Armour
- Fast and Furious (1927) - Dupont
- The Stolen Bride (1927) - Baron von Heimburg
- Temptations of a Shop Girl (1927) - André Le Croix
- The Love Mart (1927) - Jean Delicado
- That's My Daddy (1927) - Lucien Van Tassel
- The Wife's Relations (1928) - Clifford Rathburn
- A Woman's Way (1928) - Jean
- The Devil's Cage (1928) - Pierre
- Lingerie (1928) - Jack Van Cleeve
- Noah's Ark (1928) - The Frenchman / Leader of the King's Guard
- Broadway Babies (1929) - Tony Ginetti - the Nightclub Manager (uncredited)
- Twin Beds (1929) - Monty Solari
- Gold Diggers of Broadway (1929) - Barney Barnett
- The Marriage Playground (1929) - Prince Matriano
- The Aviator (1929) - Maj. Jules Gaillard
- The Unholy Three (1930) - Jeweler (uncredited)
- L'Énigmatique Monsieur Parkes (1930) - Malatroff
- Kiss Me Again (1931) - M. Bachegalupé (uncredited)
- Little Caesar (1931) - De Voss
- God's Gift to Women (1931) - Mons. Rancour
- Men of the Sky (1931) - Senor Mendoca
- Sweepstakes (1931) - Maitre D' (uncredited)
- Honeymoon Lane (1931) - King of Bulgravia
- This Modern Age (1931) - André de Graignon (replaced by Albert Conti) (scenes deleted)
- Three Wise Girls (1932) - Andre
- Ex-Lady (1933) - Man Flirting with Iris (uncredited)
- Secret Sinners (1933) - Armand Blum
- Design for Living (1933) - Mr. Burton (uncredited)
- Flying Down to Rio (1933) - One of the Three Greeks #3
- Caravan (1934) - Chief of Hussars (uncredited)
- Fashions of 1934 (1934) - Paris Cafe Manager (uncredited)
- The Cat and the Fiddle (1934) - King in Show (uncredited)
- George White's Scandals (1934) - Count Dekker
- Upper World (1934) - Maurice (uncredited)
- Kansas City Princess (1934) - Chez Maurice Headwaiter (uncredited)
- Caravan (1934) - Hussar Colonel (uncredited)
- Lottery Lover (1935) - Frenchman (uncredited)
- Ruggles of Red Gap (1935) - Clothing Salesman (uncredited)
- Here's to Romance (1935) - Andriot
- Diamond Jim (1935) - Jewelry Salesman
- Desire (1936) - Jewelry Clerk (uncredited)
- Champagne Charlie (1936) - Cashier (uncredited)
- The King and the Chorus Girl (1937) - Theatre Manager (uncredited)
- A Star Is Born (1937) - (uncredited)
- Cafe Metropole (1937) - Hotel Manager (uncredited)
- Algiers (1938) - French Police Sergeant (uncredited)
- Battle of Broadway (1938) - Maitre d'Hotel (uncredited)
- A Trip to Paris (1938) - Hotel Manager (uncredited)
- Gold Diggers in Paris (1938) - Stage Manager
- Josette (1938) - Thomas
- I'll Give a Million (1938) - Hotel Manager
- Letter of Introduction (1938) - Jules the Barber (uncredited)
- Vacation from Love (1938) - M. Fumagolly, Divorce Lawyer
- Artists and Models Abroad (1938) - Headwaiter (uncredited)
- Topper Takes a Trip (1938) - Hotel Clerk
- Off the Record (1939) - Chatteau
- The Ice Follies of 1939 (1939) - Count (uncredited)
- Midnight (1939) - Lebon
- For Love or Money (1939) - Nanda
- Chasing Danger (1939) - Arab (uncredited)
- Miracles for Sale (1939) - François (uncredited)
- Ninotchka (1939) - Louis - the Headwaiter (uncredited)
- Remember? (1939) - Marcel
- Brother Orchid (1940) - Frenchman (uncredited)
- Down Argentine Way (1940) - Hotel Manager
- Arise, My Love (1940) - Orchestra Leader (uncredited)
- Bitter Sweet (1940) - Headwaiter (uncredited)
- Ziegfeld Girl (1941) - Pierre - Headwaiter (uncredited)
- Skylark (1941) - Jeweler (uncredited) (final film role)
