= The Better Way =

1926 film

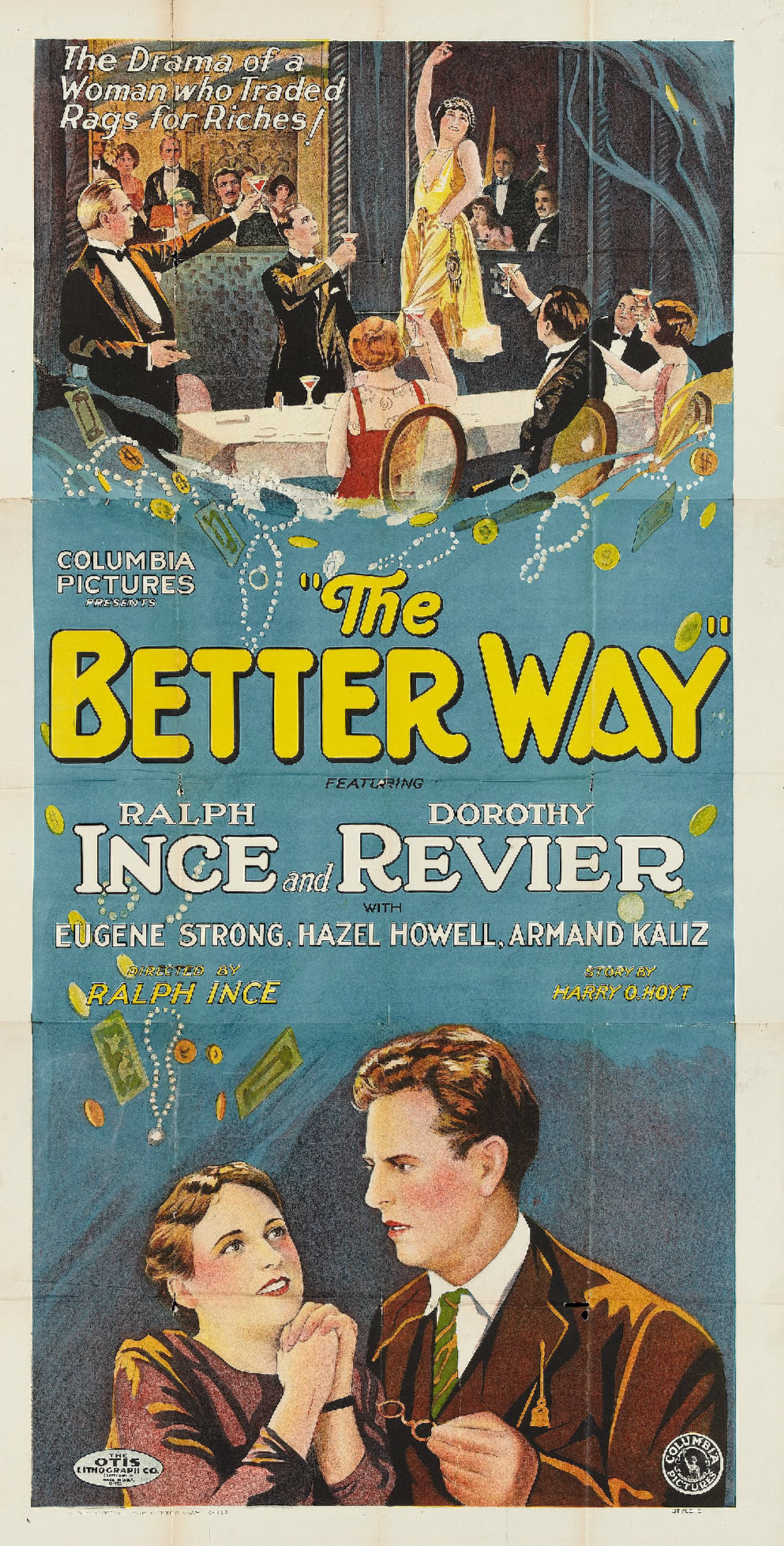
- lobby poster
- Directed by: Ralph Ince
- Written by: Dorothy Howell; Harry O. Hoyt
- Cinematography: J.O. Taylor
- Production company: Columbia Pictures
- Distributed by: Columbia Pictures
- Release date: December 5, 1926
- Running time: 58 minutes
- Country: United States
- Languages: Silent; English intertitles

The Better Way is a 1926 American silent film directed by and starring Ralph Ince.

== Cast ==
- Dorothy Revier as Betty Boyd
- Ralph Ince as Billie
- Eugene Strong
- Armand Kaliz
- Hazel Howell

== Preservation and status ==
A complete copy of the film is held at the Library of Congress.

== Bibliography ==
- Quinlan, David. The Illustrated Guide to Film Directors. Batsford, 1983.
