= Perfect Crime (1937 film) =

1937 film by Ralph Ince

- Lobby card
- Directed by: Ralph Ince
- Written by: Basil Dillon
- Produced by: Irving Asher
- Starring: Reginald Purdell; Hugh Williams; Glen Alyn
- Cinematography: Basil Emmott
- Edited by: Leslie A. Norman
- Production company: Teddington Studios
- Release date: 1937
- Running time: 69 minutes
- Country: United Kingdom
- Language: English

Perfect Crime (also known as Copper Proof) is a 1937 British film directed by Ralph Ince and starring Ince, Reginald Purdell, Hugh Williams and Glen Alyn. It was written by Basil Dillon.

== Premise ==
A man tries to disappear, but a theft and killing by someone else throws suspicion onto him.

== Cast ==
- Ralph Ince as Jim Lanahan
- Hugh Williams as Charles Brown
- Glen Alyn as Sylvia Burton
- Iris Hoey as Pennypacker
- Philip Ray as Newbold
- James Stephenson as Parker
- Wilfrid Caithness as Rawhouse
- John Carol as Snodgrass

== Reception ==
The Monthly Film Bulletin wrote: "The story is good and the plot well worked out. The direction is efficient, and the acting excellent, especially that of Hugh Williams, who cleverly differentiates his parts as the clerk and the youth of independent means. The sets are appropriate and the photography is excellent."

The Daily Film Renter wrote: "Getting away to a good start, the action promises to be engrossing, but later passages fail to hold the interest completely, and credibility seems a long way off. ...There is, however, a fair degree of suspense, and the romantic angles are attractive. Hugh Williams gives a slick portrayal as Brown, a role calling for two distinct characterisations. Ralph Ince is excellent as a holidaymaking sleuth suddenly called upon to investigate the case, and Glen Alyn handles the part of the girl. Staging is first rate."

Kine Weekly wrote: "The development is not exactly fast, but effective twists nevertheless occur at shrewdly timed intervals, while the climax combines suspense with agreeable sentiment. The film is refreshingly English without being stodgy; it has all the entertainment of the average American crime play, plus a welcome change of character and environment. Its mass appeal is obvious."
