= Breed of the Sea =

1926 film

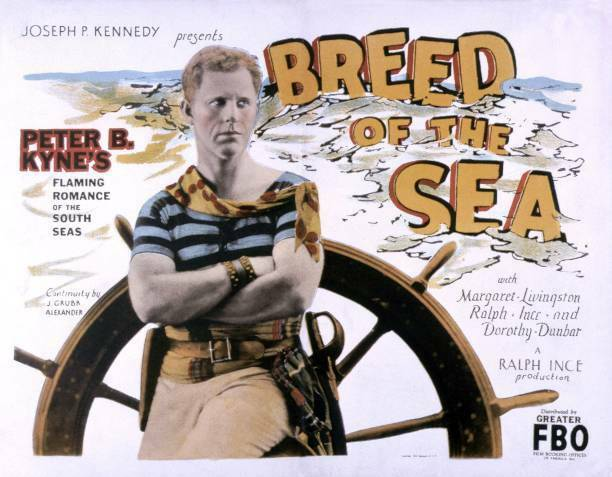
- Lobby card
- Directed by: Ralph Ince
- Written by: J.G. Hawks; J. Grubb Alexander
- Based on: "Blue Blood and the Pirates" by Peter B. Kyne
- Starring: Ralph Ince; Margaret Livingston; Dorothy Dunbar
- Cinematography: Allen G. Siegler
- Production company: Robertson-Cole Pictures Corporation
- Distributed by: Film Booking Offices of America
- Release date: November 7, 1926
- Running time: 73 minutes
- Country: United States
- Language: Silent (English intertitles)

Breed of the Sea is a 1926 American silent adventure film directed by and starring Ralph Ince with Margaret Livingston and Dorothy Dunbar.

== Cast ==
- Ralph Ince as Tod Pembroke, a.k.a. Captain Blaze Devine / Tom Pembroke
- Margaret Livingston as Marietta Rawdon
- Pat Harmon as Lije Marsh
- Alphonse Ethier as Bully Rawden
- Dorothy Dunbar as Ruth Featherstone
- Shannon Day as Martha Winston

== Preservation ==
A print of Breed of the Sea is in the collection of EYE Film Institute Netherlands.

== Bibliography ==
- Quinlan, David. The Illustrated Guide to Film Directors. Batsford, 1983. ISBN 978-0-7134-3780-5.
