= Shanghaied (1927 film) =

1927 film

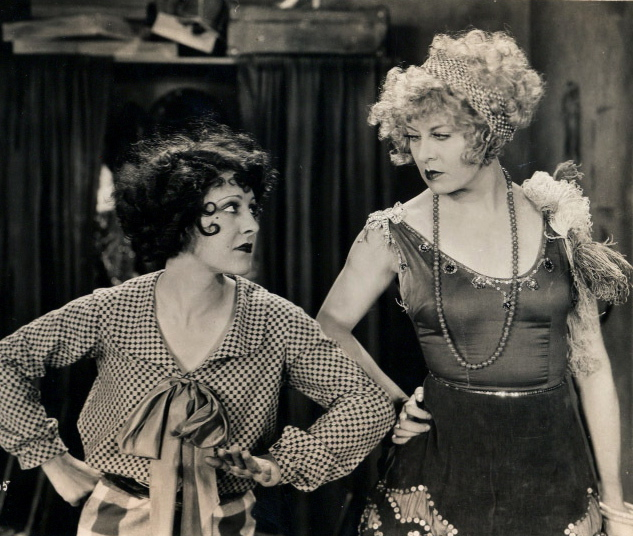
- Gertrude Astor and Patsy Ruth Miller
- Directed by: Ralph Ince
- Written by: J.G. Hawks; Edward J. Montagne
- Produced by: Ralph Ince; Joseph P. Kennedy
- Starring: Ralph Ince; Patsy Ruth Miller
- Cinematography: Joseph Walker
- Production company: Ralph Ince Productions
- Distributed by: Film Booking Offices of America
- Release date: September 12, 1927
- Country: United States
- Languages: Silent; English intertitles

Shanghaied is a 1927 American silent drama film directed by and starring Ralph Ince.

== Cast ==
- Ralph Ince as Hurricane Haley
- Patsy Ruth Miller as Polly
- Alan Brooks as Crawley
- Gertrude Astor as Bessie
- Walt Robbins as Ship's Cook
- H.J. Jacobson as Bronson

== Bibliography ==
- Quinlan, David. The Illustrated Guide to Film Directors. Batsford, 1983.
