= The Uninvited Guest (1924 film) =

1924 film by Ralph Ince

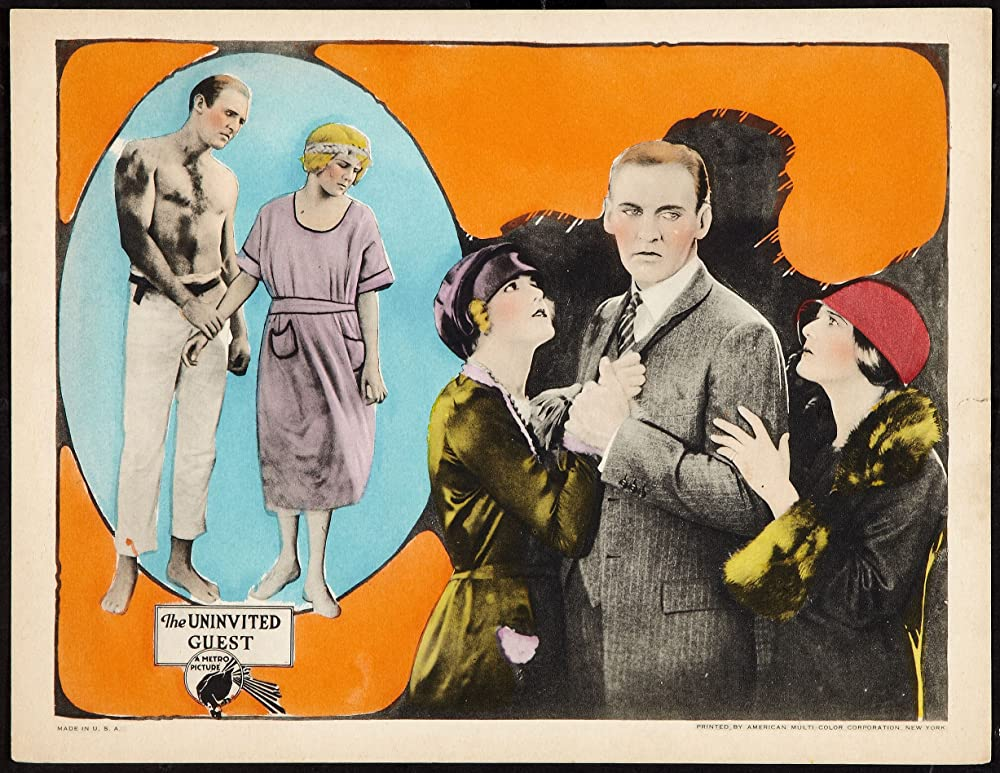
- Lobby card
- Directed by: Ralph Ince
- Written by: Curtis Benton
- Produced by: J. Ernest Williamson
- Starring: Maurice "Lefty" Flynn; Jean Tolley; Mary MacLaren; William Bailey; Louis Wolheim
- Cinematography: J.O. Taylor
- Production company: Submarine Film Corporation
- Distributed by: Metro Pictures
- Release date: February 11, 1924
- Running time: 70 minutes
- Country: United States
- Language: Silent (English intertitles)

The Uninvited Guest is a 1924 American silent drama film directed by Ralph Ince, and starring Maurice "Lefty" Flynn, Jean Tolley, Mary MacLaren, William Bailey, and Louis Wolheim. A print of the film exists in the Russian film archive Gosfilmofond. It was an early Technicolor film.

== Plot ==
As described in a film magazine review, while voyaging from Australia to New York City, Olive Granger suffers a shipwreck and manages to reach an island. Two other survivors, Irene Carlton and Fred Morgan, gamblers, steal her credentials and go to the United States, where Irene poses as Olive. The latter is rescued by Paul Patterson, a diver, who has to fight off his partner Jan Boomer for her. Boomer meets his demise in the clutching coils of a giant octopus. Paul and Olive arrive in New York City, expose the imposters, and are wed.

== Cast ==
- Maurice Bennett Flynn as Paul "Gin" Patterson
- Jean Tolley as Olive Granger
- Mary MacLaren as Irene Carlton
- William Bailey as Fred Morgan
- Louis Wolheim as Jan Boomer

== Production ==
The film was shot partially in the Bahamas and included scenes made using the Williamson underwater camera, and was released by Metro Pictures a few months before the merger that created Metro-Goldwyn. The film had a sequence filmed in Technicolor.

== See also ==
- List of early color feature films
