= Partners in Crime (1928 film) =

1928 film

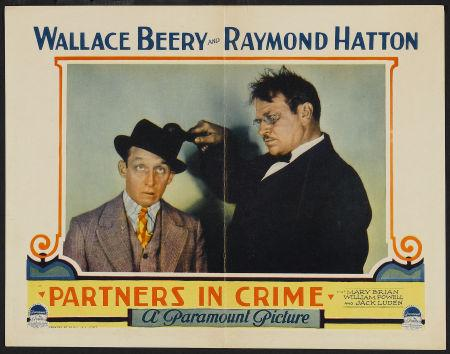
- Lobby card
- Directed by: Frank R. Strayer
- Screenplay by: George Marion Jr. Grover Jones; Gilbert Pratt
- Produced by: Jesse L. Lasky; Adolph Zukor
- Starring: Wallace Beery; Raymond Hatton; Mary Brian; William Powell
- Cinematography: William Marshall
- Edited by: William Shea
- Production company: Famous Players–Lasky Corporation
- Distributed by: Paramount Pictures
- Release date: March 17, 1928
- Running time: 65 minutes
- Country: United States
- Language: Silent (English intertitles)

Partners in Crime is a 1928 American silent comedy film directed by Frank R. Strayer and written by George Marion Jr., Grover Jones and Gilbert Pratt. The film stars Wallace Beery, Raymond Hatton, Mary Brian, William Powell, Jack Luden, Arthur Housman, and Albert Roccardi.

Partners in Crime was released on March 17, 1928, by Paramount Pictures. A print of the film exists in the Library of Congress film archive.

== Plot ==
Richard Deming is an assistant district attorney in the city. He is in a relationship with Marie Burke, working as a cigarette girl in a nightclub. One day, Deming imitates his boss' voice while appearing on a radio show; he is immediately fired. While walking around the city, Deming witnesses a store robbery. The robbers then kidnap him because he saw their faces.

The police think that Deming robbed the store and start searching for him. Marie knows he is innocent; she enlists the help of 'Scoop' McGee, a newspaper reporter and Detective Mike Doolan. Wanting to impress Marie, the two men go to the robbers' hideout. While there, McGee and Doolan encounter a violent gang war, and accidentally set off a stolen case of police tear gas canisters. During the chaos, Marie summons the police to the hideout; they arrest the real robbers and free Deming.

== Cast ==
Wallace Beery as Mike Doolan

- Wallace Beery as Detective Mike Doolan
- Raymond Hatton as 'Scoop' McGee, the reporter
- Mary Brian as Marie Burke, the cigarette girl
- William Powell as Smith
- Jack Luden as Richard Deming, Assistant District Attorney
- Arthur Housman as Barton
- Albert Roccardi as Kanelli, the restaurant owner
- Joseph W. Girard as chief of police
- George Irving as B.R. Carnwall
- Bruce Gordon as Dodo
- Jack Richardson as Jake

== See also ==
Filmography of Wallace Beery
