= J. Grubb Alexander =

American screenwriter

- Born: December 25, 1887; Scranton, Pennsylvania, US
- Died: January 11, 1932 (aged 44); Los Angeles, California, US
- Occupation: Screenwriter
- Years active: 1916-1932

Joseph Grubb Alexander (December 25, 1887 – January 11, 1932) was an American screenwriter of the silent era. He wrote for more than 90 films between 1916 and 1932. He was born in Scranton, Pennsylvania, to Joseph and Florence Grubb Alexander. His father was from Scotland and his mother was the daughter of Capt. Evan P. Grubb, a Civil War veteran. Joseph died from pneumonia in Los Angeles, California at the age of 44.

== Partial filmography ==
- Mixed Blood (1916)
- The Charmer (1917)
- The Voice on the Wire (1917)
- The Plow Woman (1917)
- The Lash of Power (1917)
- Fighting Mad (1917)
- Fear Not (1917)
- The Scarlet Crystal (1917)
- The Spotted Lily (1917)
- The Phantom's Secret (1917)
- The High Sign (1917)
- The Gates of Doom (1917)
- The Empty Gun (1917)
- Maid o' the Storm (1918)
- Shackled (1918)
- The Trail of the Octopus (1919)
- The Thunderbolt (1919)
- The Screaming Shadow (1920)
- The Purple Cipher (1920)
- Old Dad (1920)
- The Brand of Lopez (1920)
- Moon Madness (1920)
- The Road to Divorce (1920)
- The Broken Spur (1921)
- Not Guilty (1921)
- The Innocent Cheat (1921)
- Back to Yellow Jacket (1922)
- Belle of Alaska (1922)
- Colleen of the Pines (1922)
- One Eighth Apache (1922)
- Chain Lightning (1922)
- One Glorious Night (1924)
- Passionate Youth (1925)
- Bigger Than Barnum's (1926)
- Remember (1926)
- The Sea Wolf (1926)
- The Belle of Broadway (1926)
- The Lone Wolf Returns (1926)
- Breed of the Sea (1926)
- The Lady from Hell (1926)
- Rose of the Tenements (1926)
- The Chinese Parrot (1927)
- Paying the Price (1927)
- Midnight Rose (1928)
- The Michigan Kid (1928)
- The Man Who Laughs (1928)
- Evidence (1929)
- General Crack (1930)
- Moby Dick (1930)
- Outward Bound (1930)
- Svengali (1931)
- The Hatchet Man (1932)
