= The Highest Law (film) =

1921 film

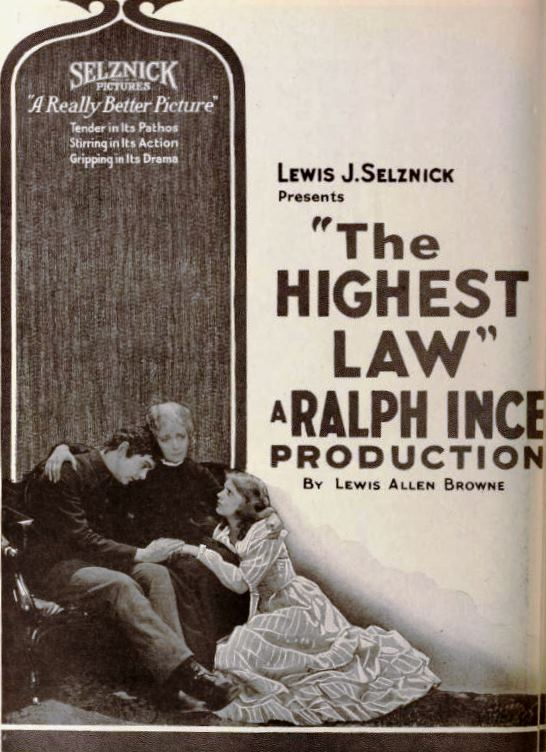
- Directed by: Ralph Ince
- Written by: Lewis Allen Browne
- Produced by: Lewis J. Selznick
- Starring: Ralph Ince; Robert Agnew; Margaret Seddon
- Production company: Selznick Pictures
- Distributed by: Select Pictures
- Release date: February 5, 1921
- Running time: 60 minutes
- Country: United States
- Languages: Silent; English intertitles

The Highest Law is a 1921 American silent historical drama film directed by Ralph Ince and starring Ince, Robert Agnew and Margaret Seddon.

== Cast ==
- Ralph Ince as Abraham Lincoln
- Robert Agnew as Bobby Goodwin
- Margaret Seddon as Mrs. Goodwin
- Aleen Burr as The Girl
- Cecil Crawford as Tad

== See also ==
- List of films and television shows about the American Civil War

== Bibliography ==
- Connelly, Robert B. The Silents: Silent Feature Films, 1910-36, Volume 40, Issue 2. December Press, 1998.
- Munden, Kenneth White. The American Film Institute Catalog of Motion Pictures Produced in the United States, Part 1. University of California Press, 1997.
