= Albert Roccardi =

Italian actor (1864–1934)

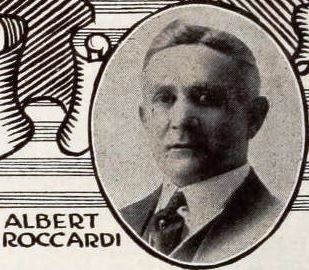
- Roccardi in 1917
- Born: 9 May 1864; Rome
- Died: 14 May 1934 (aged 70); Los Angeles, California, USA
- Years active: 1912–1933

Albert Roccardi (9 May 1864 – 14 May 1934) was an Italian actor of the silent era. He appeared in more than 60 films between 1912 and 1933. He was born in Rome and died in Los Angeles, California.

Albert Roccardi, stage actor (SAYRE 8367)

== Partial filmography ==
- Mr. Barnes of New York (1914)
- The Battle of Frenchman's Run (1915)
- A Modern Thelma (1916)
- My Lady's Slipper (1916)
- Tangled Lives (1918)
- The Virtuous Model (1919)
- Greater Than Fame (1920)
- The Rider of the King Log (1921)
- The Passionate Pilgrim (1921)
- The Inside of the Cup (1921)
- A Pasteboard Crown (1922)
- Destiny's Isle (1922)
- Galloping Hoofs (1924)
- Sunken Silver (1925)
- The Street of Forgotten Men (1925)
- The Belle of Broadway (1926)
- Fools of Fashion (1926)
- Melting Millions (1927)
- Partners in Crime (1928)
- Romance of the Rio Grande (1929)
- Just Like Heaven (1930)
