= A Woman's Way (1928 film) =

1928 film

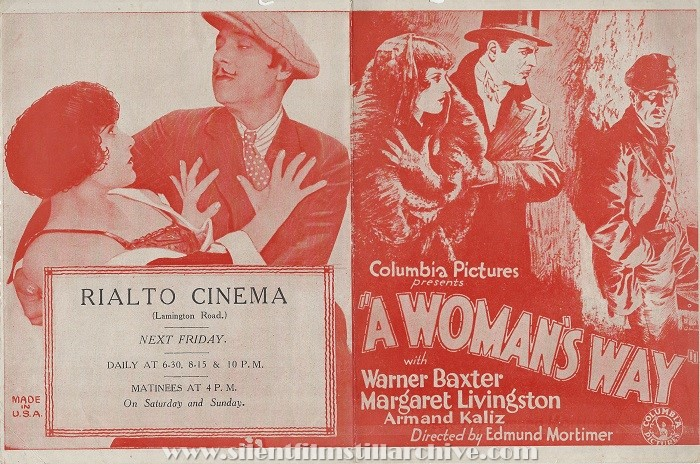
- Directed by: Edmund Mortimer
- Written by: Izola Forrester; Elmer Harris; Will M. Ritchey
- Produced by: Harry Cohn
- Starring: Margaret Livingston; Warner Baxter; Armand Kaliz
- Cinematography: Ray June
- Edited by: Arthur Roberts
- Production company: Columbia Pictures
- Distributed by: Columbia Pictures
- Release date: February 13, 1928
- Running time: 57 minutes
- Country: United States
- Languages: Silent; English intertitles

A Woman's Way is a lost 1928 American silent drama film directed by Edmund Mortimer and starring Margaret Livingston, Warner Baxter and Armand Kaliz.

== Cast ==
- Margaret Livingston as Liane
- Warner Baxter as Tony
- Armand Kaliz as Jean
- Mathilde Comont as Mother Suzy
- Ernie Adams as Pedro
- John St. Polis as Mouvet

== Bibliography ==
- Adrienne L. McLean. Dying Swans and Madmen: Ballet, the Body, and Narrative Cinema. Rutgers University Press, 2008.
