= John Ernest Williamson =

Pioneer underwater photographer

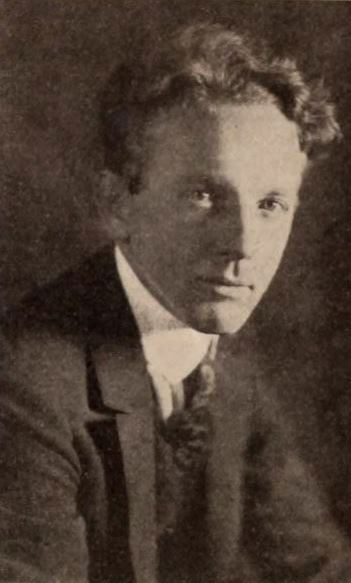
- Underwater photographer and submarine films John Ernest Williamson
- Born: 8 December 1881
- Died: 15 July 1966
- Known for: underwater filmmaking
- Spouse: Lilah Freeland Williamson
- Children: Sylvia, Annecke Jans

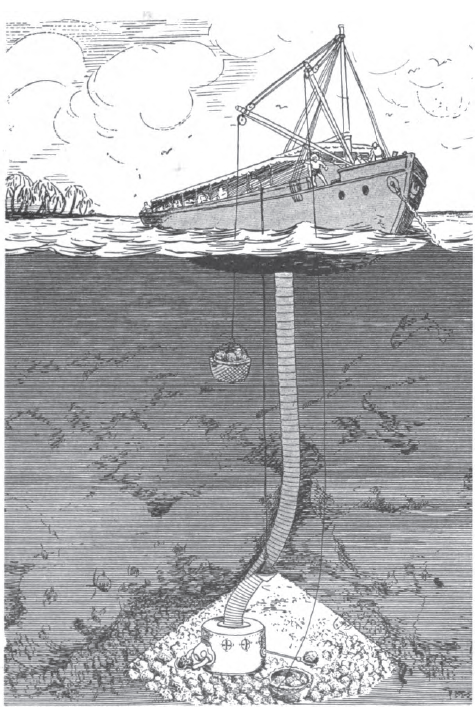
A 1915 illustration of the tube, drawn by Ernest's younger brother George

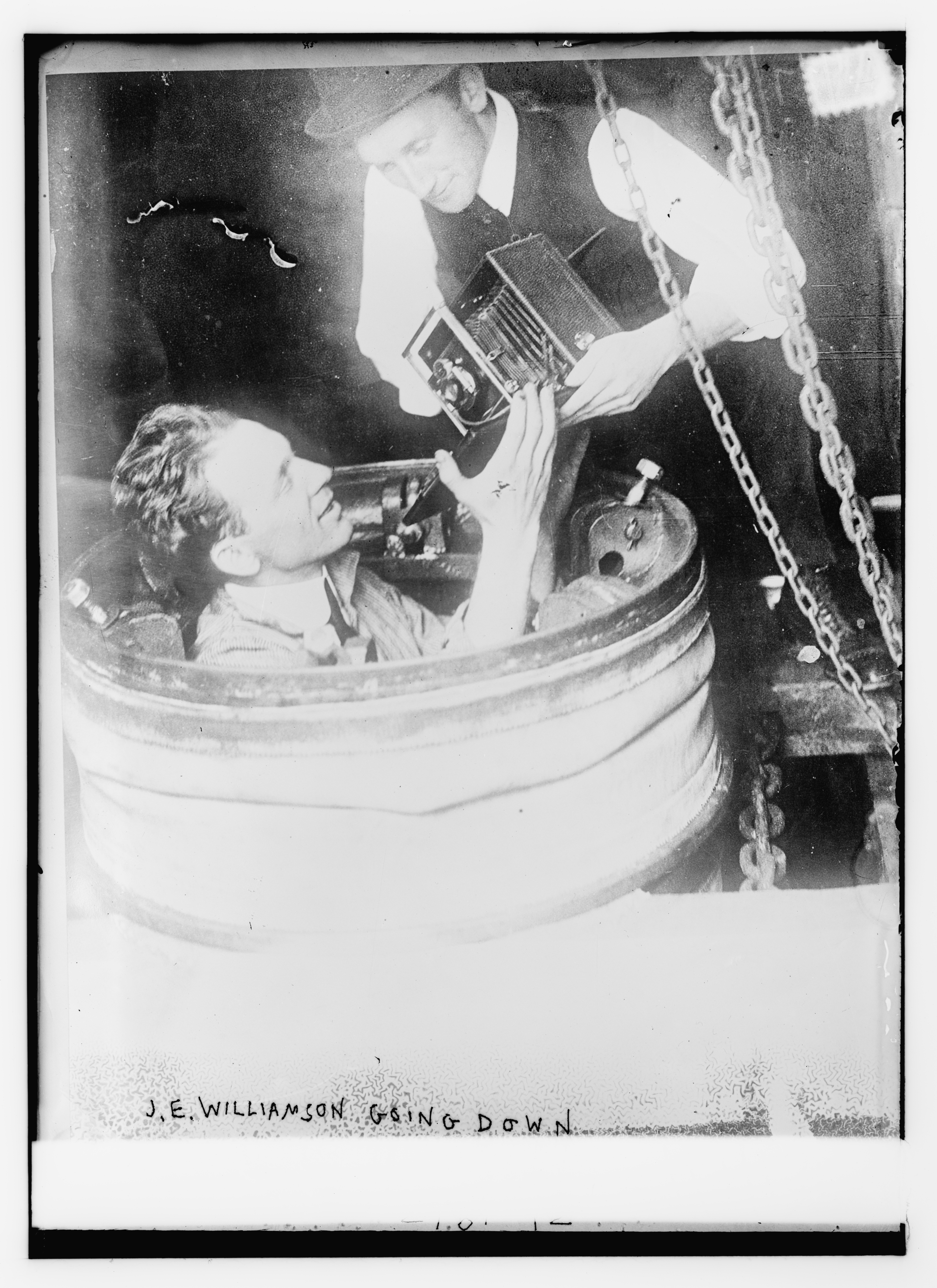
Williamson descending into the tube with camera

John Ernest Williamson (8 December 1881 – 15 July 1966) was an English filmmaker who invented the "photosphere" from which he filmed and photographed undersea. He is credited as being the first person to take an underwater photograph from a submarine.

== Biography ==
He was born in Liverpool, England 1881 to Charles Williamson, a sea captain from Norfolk, Virginia. Charles had invented a deep-sea tube, made of concentric iron rings, "which stretched like an accordion". The tube was used for underwater repair and for ship salvage. In 1912 Williamson, while working as a reporter, used the device to make underwater photographs in Norfolk Harbor. He then expanded the photosphere, which he named Jules Verne, and used it to create motion pictures, starting first in the Bahamas.

Williamson created a film company, the Submarine Film Corporation. Their first feature film came out in 1914 and was entitled "Thirty Leagues Under the Sea" starring Williamson in a fight with a shark. The Submarine Film Corporation would also partner with other companies such as Thanhouser Company. J. Ernest Williamson and his brother George M. Williamson would shoot and develop the film using their photosphere which was then finalized and distributed by others.

== Partial filmography ==
- Thirty Leagues Under the Sea (1914)
- Twenty Thousand Leagues Under the Sea (1916)
- The Submarine Eye (1917)
- The White Heather (1919)
- Wet Gold (1921)
- Wonders of the Sea (1922)
- The Uninvited Guest (1924)
- The Mysterious Island (1929)
- With Williamson Beneath the Sea (1932)
