= Enid Hibbard =

American screenwriter

- Born: Enid Burke; February 27, 1889; Cincinnati, Ohio, USA
- Died: May 24, 1960 (aged 71); Los Angeles, California, USA
- Occupation: Screenwriter

Enid Hibbard (born Enid Burke) was an American screenwriter active during the 1920s.

== Biography ==
Enid Burke, sometimes referred to by her childhood nickname, Nana, was born in Cincinnati, Ohio. Her father died when she was young, and her mother, Marie Swing, remarried prominent businessman Wellington Hibbard, who adopted Enid and her older sister, Charlotte.

Enid went to New York to study at the American Academy of Dramatic Arts, where she graduated in 1910. She also dreamed of becoming a professional aviator, and by the time she was 20, she was flying planes in St. Louis, where she worked as a saleswoman by day.

Sometime after her older sister died in a train accident (1912) and her stepfather died in a car wreck (1910), she moved to Los Angeles and took a job as a studio stenographer. By 1925, she was writing screenplays, first under contract at RKO and later at Columbia, where she went under contract in 1929. Little is known about what became of Enid after 1929, although the 1940 census shows she remained employed as a story reader. Hibbard never married, and she died in Los Angeles in 1960.

== Selected filmography ==
- Hurricane (1929)
- Hardboiled (1929)
- Danger Street (1928)
- Sally of the Scandals (1928)
- Crooks Can't Win (1928)
- Chicago After Midnight (1928)
- Coney Island (1928)
- South Sea Love (1927)
- Driven from Home (1927)
- The Coward (1927)
- Ladies Beware (1927)
- Driven from the Home (1927)
- The Border Whirlwind (1926)
- The Masquerade Bandit (1926)
- A Poor Girl's Romance (1926)
- Every Man's Wife (1925)
