= The Belle of Broadway =

1926 film by Harry O. Hoyt

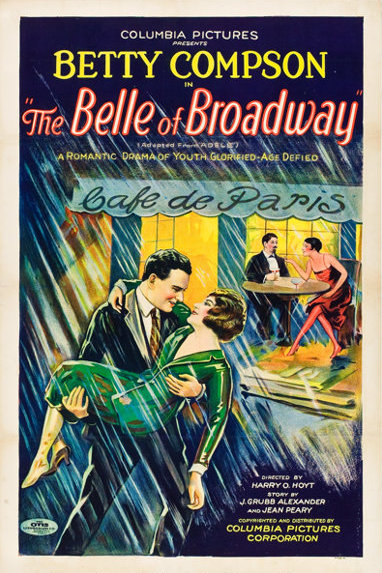
- Film poster
- Directed by: Harry O. Hoyt
- Written by: J. Grubb Alexander (story); Jean Perry (story); Alexander Perry (adaptation)
- Based on: Adele; 1913 musical by Paul Herve
- Produced by: Harry Cohn
- Starring: Betty Compson
- Cinematography: J.O. Taylor
- Distributed by: Columbia Pictures
- Release date: August 15, 1926
- Running time: 62 minutes; 6 reels
- Country: United States
- Language: Silent (English intertitles)

The Belle of Broadway (1926) by Harry O. Hoyt

The Belle of Broadway is a 1926 American silent romantic drama film produced and distributed by Columbia Pictures. It was directed by Harry O. Hoyt and starred Betty Compson.

The film was released as part of Columbia Classics Volume 5 on Ultra HD Blu-ray/Blu-ray Disc on October 22, 2024, by Sony Pictures Home Entertainment as a bonus film.

== Plot ==
Adele (Compson) was once the toast of Paris with her performances of DuBarry. But the years have passed; now older (and played by Yorke), she can no longer find work. A young neighbor named Marie (Compson again) sees to her needs, and Adele, suddenly noting the resemblance to her younger self, persuades her to pretend to be her, explaining that plastic surgery has made her look youthful again. The ruse works, and coached by Adele, Marie stars in a revival of "DuBarry" and Paris is enchanted anew. Unfortunately, this new-found success creates a whole new set of problems that will affect both of them as well as the young man (Rawlinson) who's wooing her.

The plot is almost identical in Fedora, made 52 years later by Billy Wilder but based on a short story by Tom Tryon from his collection Crowned Heads.

== Cast ==
- Betty Compson as Marie Duval
- Herbert Rawlinson as Paul Merlin
- Edith Yorke as Madame Adele
- Armand Kaliz as Count Raoul de Parma
- Ervin Renard as Fabio Merlin
- Max Barwyn as M. Laroux (credited as Max Berwyn)
- Albert Roccardi as Laroux's Associate
- Tom Ricketts as Maurice Penelli (credited as Thomas Ricketts)
- Wilfrid North as Major Anstruthers, an Old Beau (credited as Wilfred North)
- Edward Warren as An Old Beau
- Edward Kipling as An Old Beau
- August Tollaire as Bearded Old Beau (credited as A. Tollaire)

== Preservation ==
A print of The Belle of Broadway is preserved in the Library of Congress collection.
