= J. O. Taylor =

American cinematographer (1887–1974)

J.O. Taylor
- Born: James O. Taylor; December 27, 1887; Virginia, US
- Died: September 7, 1974 (aged 86); Los Angeles, California, US
- Occupation: Cinematographer
- Years active: 1916–1933 (film)

James O. Taylor (December 28, 1887 – September 7, 1974), generally credited as J.O. Taylor, was an American cinematographer best known for his work on King Kong (1933).

== Selected filmography ==
- A Son of Erin (1916)
- The Bond Between (1917)
- A Daughter of the Wolf (1919)
- Behind the Door (1919)
- Below the Surface (1920)
- A Thousand to One (1920)
- The Brute Master (1920)
- Blind Hearts (1921)
- A Private Scandal (1921)
- The Sea Lion (1921)
- The Cup of Life (1921)
- Man Alone (1923)
- The Last Moment (1923)
- Scars of Jealousy (1923)
- The House of Youth (1924)
- The Uninvited Guest (1924)
- The Better Way (1926)
- The Lone Wolf Returns (1926)
- The Sea Wolf (1926)
- Bigger Than Barnum's (1926)
- Sweet Rosie O'Grady (1926)
- Remember (1926)
- The Belle of Broadway (1926)
- Obey the Law (1926)
- For Ladies Only (1927)
- Birds of Prey (1927)
- Alias the Lone Wolf (1927)
- Wandering Girls (1927)
- The Blood Ship (1927)
- Afraid to Love (1927)
- Stolen Pleasures (1927)
- Sally in Our Alley (1927)
- The Price of Honor (1927)
- By Whose Hand? (1927)
- The Bachelor's Baby (1927)
- Pleasure Before Business (1927)
- The Haunted Ship (1927)
- The Kid Sister (1927)
- Coney Island (1928)
- The Wreck of the Singapore (1928)
- Chicago After Midnight (1928)
- Fashion Madness (1928)
- Happy Days (1929)
- Smoke Bellew (1929)
- Song o' My Heart (1930)
- A Soldier's Plaything (1930)
- The Monkey's Paw (1933)
- King Kong (1933)
- Son of Kong (1933)

== Bibliography ==
- Darby, William. Masters of Lens and Light: A Checklist of Major Cinematographers and Their Feature Films. Scarecrow Press, 1991.
- Soister, John T., Nicolella, Henry & Joyce, Steve. American Silent Horror, Science Fiction and Fantasy Feature Films, 1913-1929. McFarland, 2014.
