= The Last Moment (1923 film) =

1923 silent film

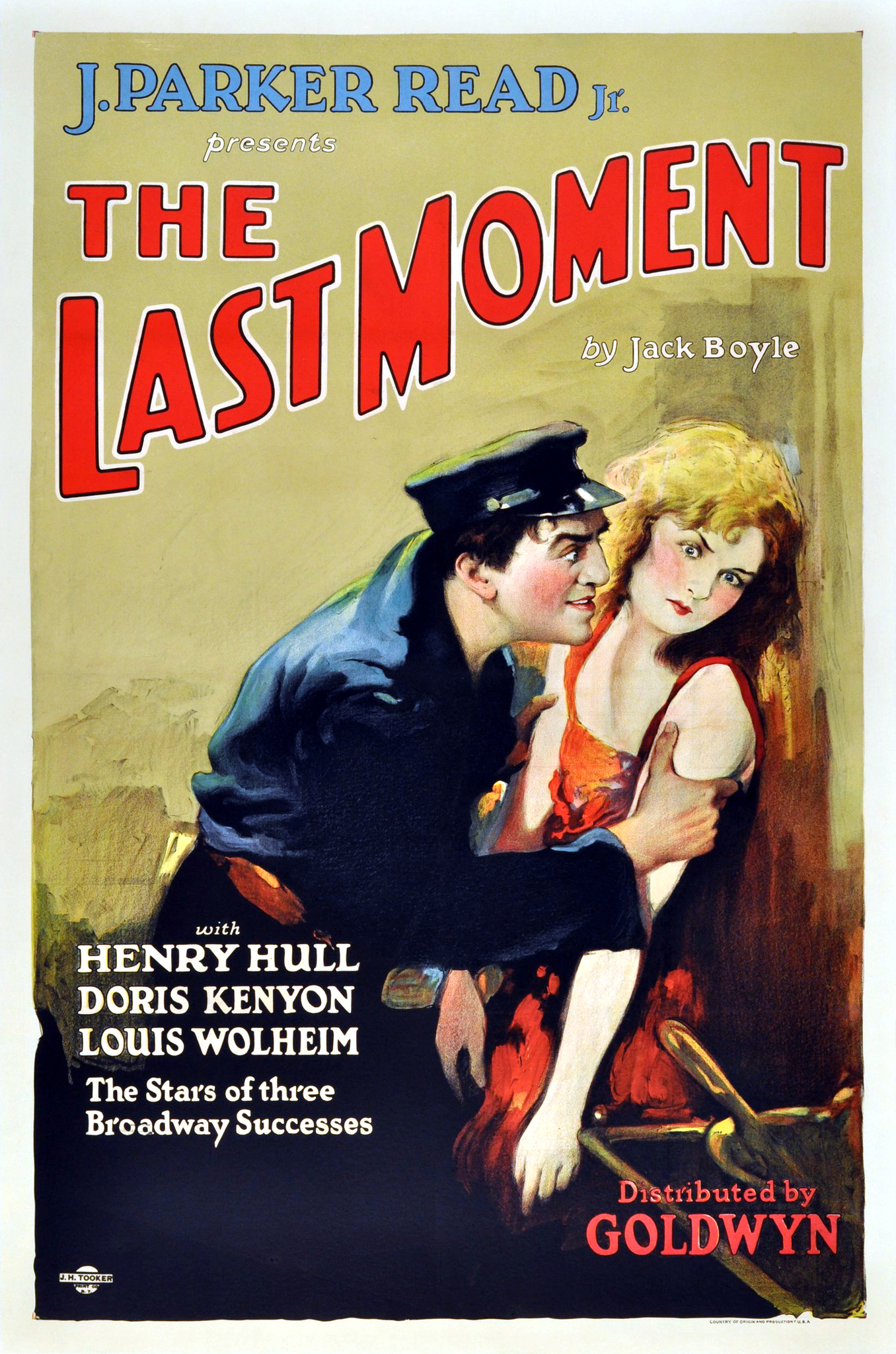
- Directed by: J. Parker Read Jr.
- Written by: Jack Boyle; J. Clarkson Miller
- Produced by: J. Parker Read Jr.
- Starring: Henry Hull; Doris Kenyon; Louis Wolheim
- Cinematography: J.O. Taylor
- Production company: J. Parker Read Jr. Productions
- Distributed by: Goldwyn Distributing
- Release date: June 7, 1923
- Running time: 60 minutes
- Country: United States
- Languages: Silent; English intertitles

The Last Moment is a lost 1923 American silent horror film directed by J. Parker Read Jr. and starring Henry Hull, Doris Kenyon and Louis Wolheim.

== Cast ==
- Henry Hull as Hercules Napoleon Cameron
- Doris Kenyon as Alice Winthrop
- Louis Wolheim as The Finn
- Louis Calhern as Harry Gaines
- William Nally as Big Mike
- Mickey Bennett as Danny
- Harry Allen as Pat Rooney
- Donald Hall as Mr. Winthrop
- Danny Hayes as Bartender
- Jerry Peterson as The thing
- Robert Hazelton as The butler

== Status ==
- Today the film is lost.

== Bibliography ==
- Soister, John T., Nicolella, Henry & Joyce, Steve. American Silent Horror, Science Fiction and Fantasy Feature Films, 1913-1929. McFarland, 2014.
