= The Sea Wolf (1926 film) =

1926 film

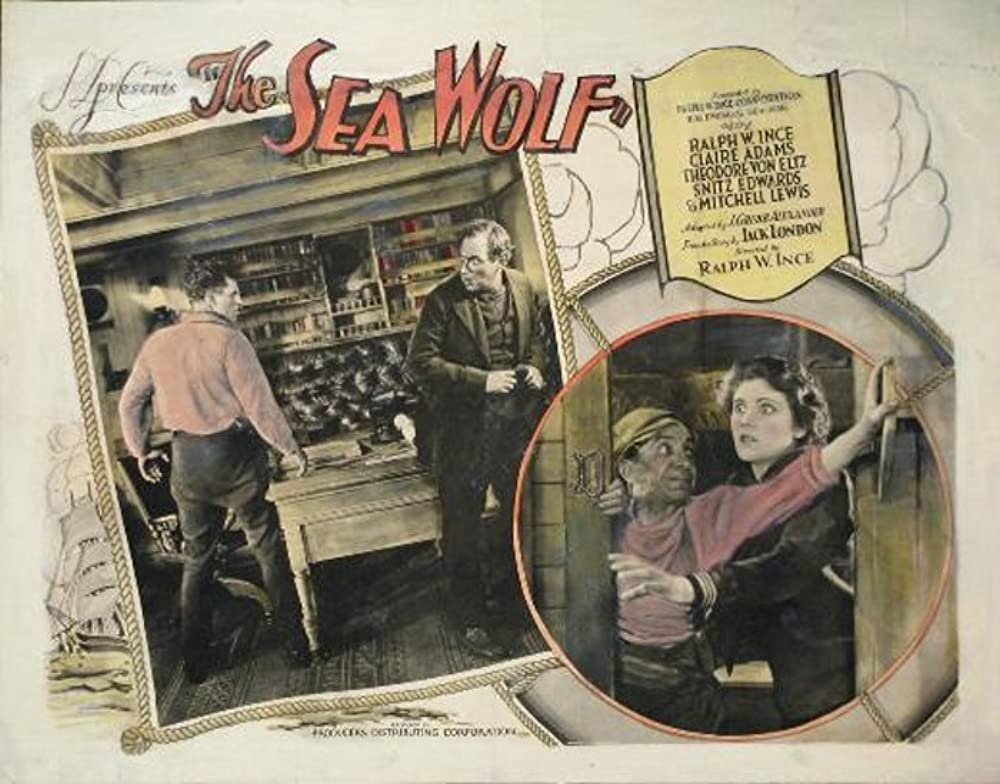
- Poster
- Directed by: Ralph Ince
- Written by: J. Grubb Alexander
- Based on: The Sea-Wolf; 1904 novel by Jack London
- Produced by: John C. Flinn
- Starring: Ralph Ince; Claire Adams; Theodore Von Eltz
- Cinematography: J.O. Taylor
- Music by: Sebastián Piana
- Production company: Ralph W. Ince Corporation
- Distributed by: Producers Distributing Corporation
- Release date: September 10, 1926
- Running time: 70 minutes
- Country: United States
- Language: Silent (English intertitles)

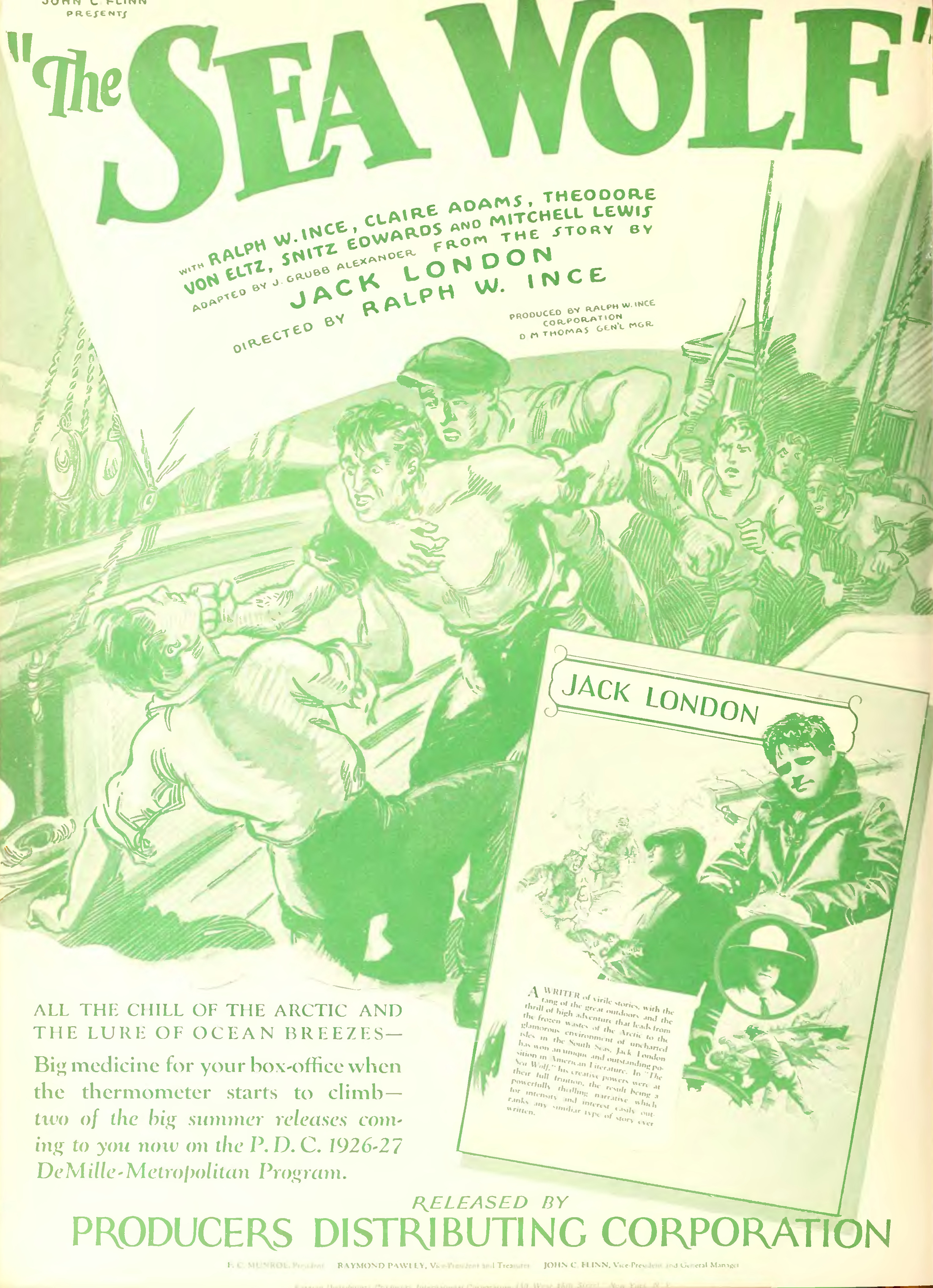
The Sea Wolf ad in Motion Picture News, 1926

The Sea Wolf is a 1926 American silent drama film directed by and starring Ralph Ince. It is based on the 1904 novel The Sea-Wolf by Jack London. The London novel was previously filmed in 1920 at Paramount Pictures as The Sea Wolf.

== Plot summary ==
While both on a ferry from San Francisco to Oakland, critic Humphrey Van Weyden and novelist Maud Brewster are both forced overboard when the ferry collides with another sailing vessel. Both "Hump" and Maud are marooned and later rescued by "Ghost", a two-masted sailing vessel, captained by "Wolf" Larsen and his crew. Following the storyline of London's novel closely, though both Van Weyden and Brewster wish to return to the mainland, the genius but tyrannical captain refused their request and instead forces them to work aboard the sailing vessel as members of the crew. Chaos overtakes the ship in the third act of the film due to the captain's oppressive leadership and poor treatment of the crew, leading to mutiny and a way out for both Humphrey and Maud.

== Cast ==
- Ralph Ince as 'Wolf' Larsen
- Claire Adams as Maud Brewster
- Theodore von Eltz as Humphrey Van Weyden
- Snitz Edwards as Thomas Mugridge
- Mitchell Lewis as Johansen, the Mate

== Preservation ==
With no prints of The Sea Wolf located in any film archives, it is a lost film.

== Bibliography ==
- Quinlan, David. The Illustrated Guide to Film Directors. Batsford, 1983.
