= The Wreck of the Singapore =

1928 film by Ralph Ince

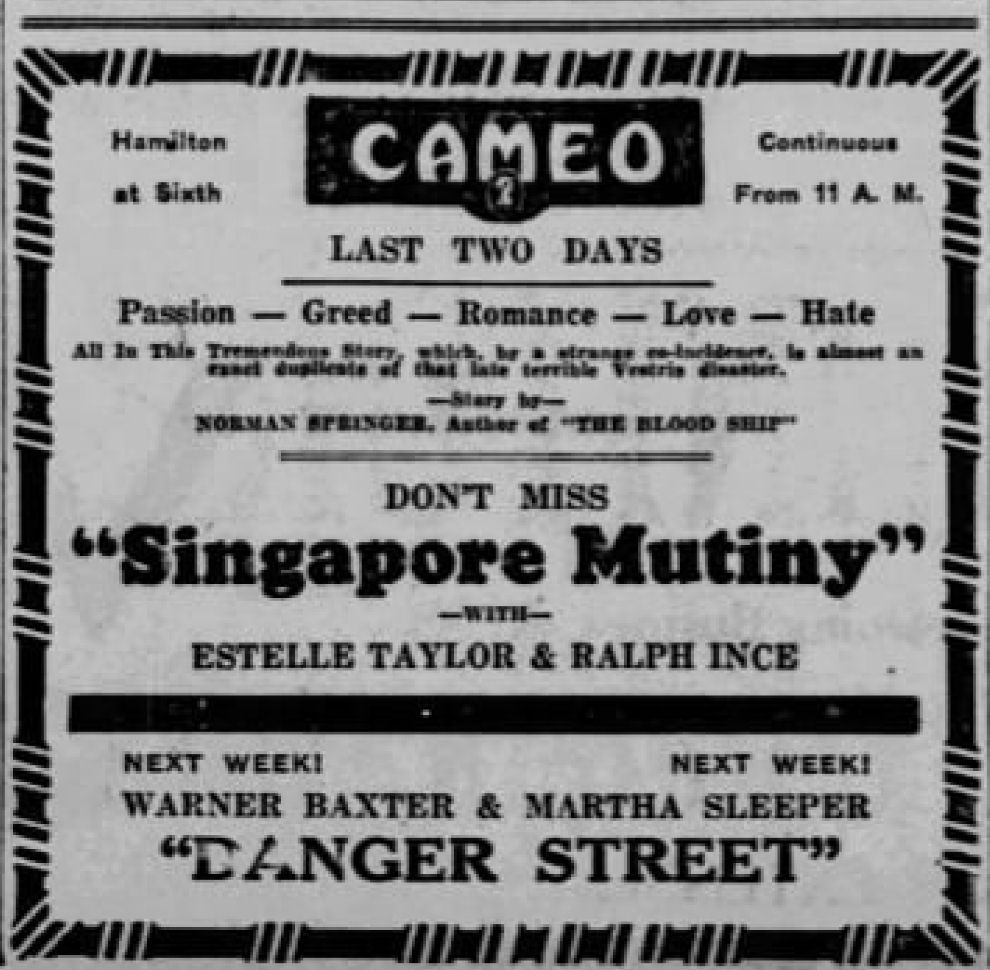
- Newspaper advertisement for The Singapore Mutiny
- Directed by: Ralph Ince
- Written by: Ralph Ince; Fred Myton; Norman Springer
- Starring: Ralph Ince; Estelle Taylor
- Cinematography: J. O. Taylor
- Edited by: George M. Arthur
- Production company: Film Booking Offices of America (FBO)
- Distributed by: FBO
- Release date: October 7, 1928
- Running time: 7 reels
- Country: United States
- Language: Silent (English intertitles)

The Wreck of the Singapore, also known as The Singapore Mutiny, is a 1928 American silent drama film directed by Ralph Ince and starring Ince, Estelle Taylor, and Jim Mason.

== Cast ==
- Ralph Ince as Kelsey
- Estelle Taylor as Daisy
- Jim Mason as Borg
- Gardner James as The Stiff
- William Irving as Huber
- Harry Allen as Mr. Watts
- Carl Axzelle as Cockney
- Martha Mattox as Mrs. Watts
- Robert Gaillard as Captain
- Frank Newburg as Petty Officer

== Censorship ==
When The Wreck of the Singapore was released, many states and cities in the United States had censor boards that could require cuts or other eliminations before the film could be shown. The Kansas censor board ordered a cut of an intertitle with the caption, "I'm dirtier inside than you are out."

== Bibliography ==
- Quinlan, David. The Illustrated Guide to Film Directors. Batsford, 1983.
