= Chicago After Midnight =

1928 film

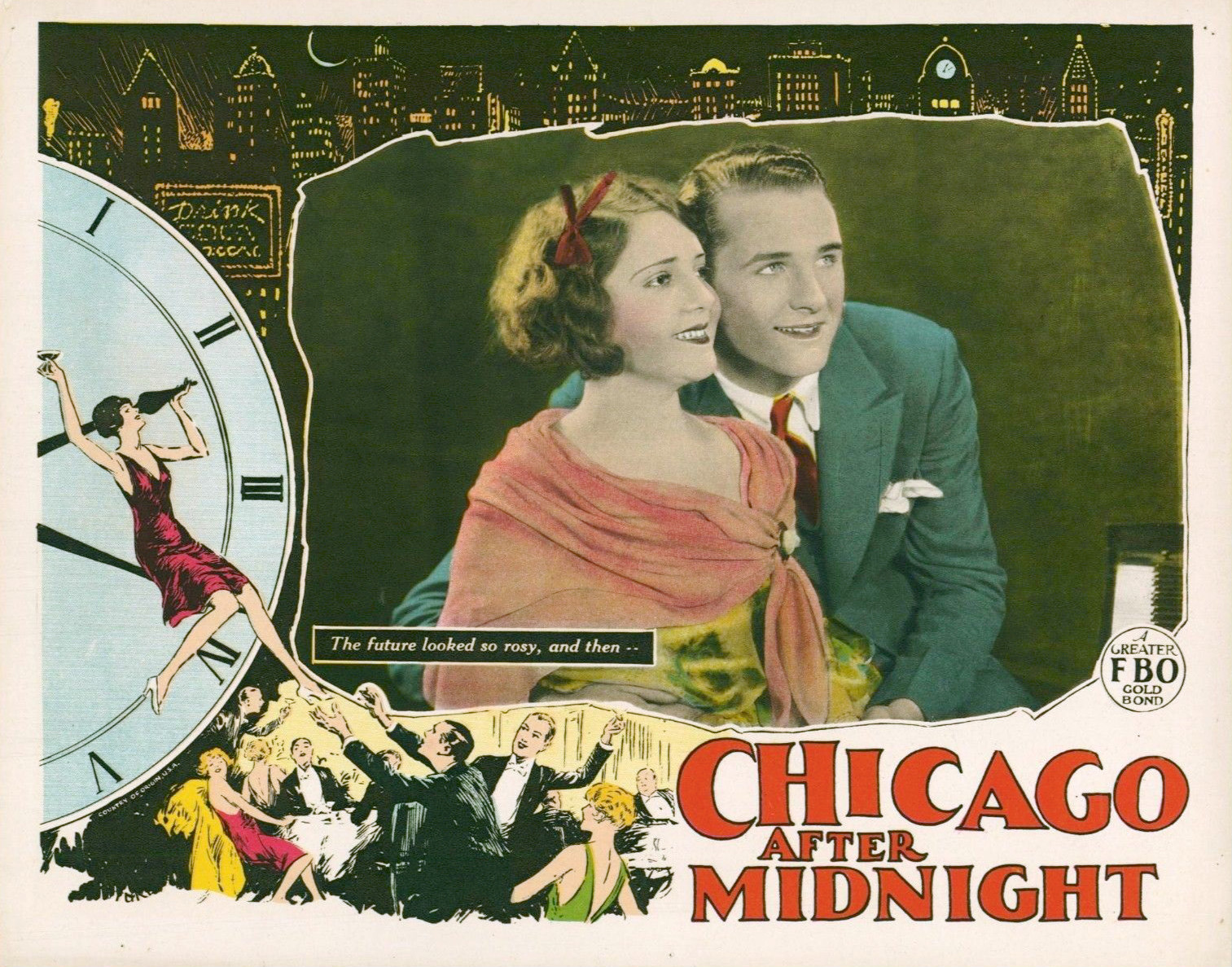
- Lobby card
- Directed by: Ralph Ince
- Written by: George M. Arthur; Charles Harris; Enid Hibbard
- Cinematography: J.O. Taylor
- Edited by: George M. Arthur
- Production company: Film Booking Offices of America (FBO)
- Distributed by: FBO
- Release date: March 4, 1928
- Running time: 70 minutes
- Country: United States
- Language: Silent (English intertitles)

Chicago After Midnight is a 1928 American silent crime drama film directed by and starring Ralph Ince.

== Cast ==
- Ralph Ince as Jim Boyd
- Jola Mendez as Betty Boyd / Mona Gale
- Lorraine Rivero as Betty Boyd, as a baby
- James "Jim" Mason as Hardy
- Carl Axzelle as Ike (the Rat)
- Helen Jerome Eddy as Mrs. Boyd
- Ole M. Ness as Tanner
- Robert Seiter as Jack Waring
- Frank Mills as Frank
- Christian J. Frank as Casey

== Preservation ==
With no prints of Chicago After Midnight located in any film archives, it is a lost film.

== Bibliography ==
- Quinlan, David. The Illustrated Guide to Film Directors. Batsford, 1983.
