= Harry Allen (actor) =

Australian-American actor

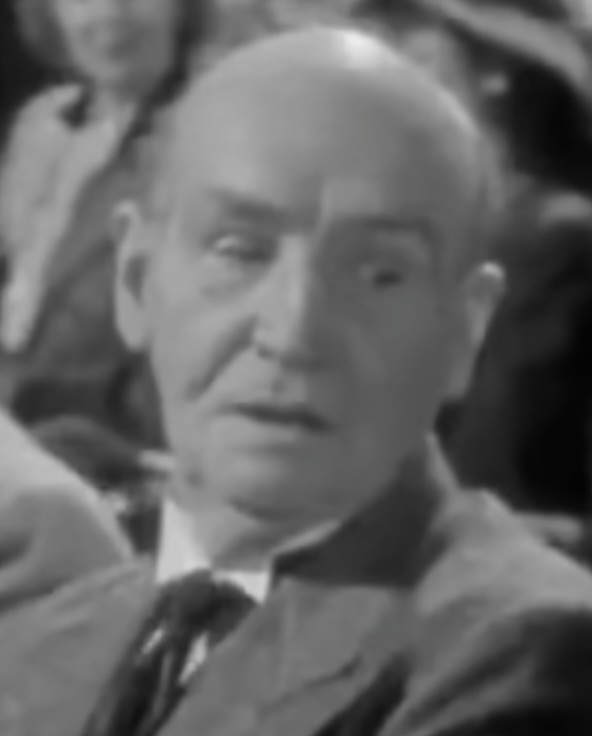
- Allen in Dressed to Kill (1946)
- Born: Henry Radford Allen; 10 July 1877; Melbourne, Victoria, Australia
- Died: 4 December 1951 (aged 74); Van Nuys, California, U.S.
- Occupation: Actor
- Years active: 1923–1949
- Spouses: Marjorie Josephine Condon (m. 1910; div. 1915): Gertrude Dorothea Hyde
- Children: 2

Harry Allen (born Henry Radford Allen; 10 July 1877 – 4 December 1951) was an Australian-born American character actor of the silent and sound film eras. He was born in Melbourne, Victoria, Australia. Allen's World War One registration card gives his date of birth as 10 July 1876 and confirms his place of birth as Melbourne, although at least one obituary gives the later birth year of 1883.

== Career ==
Allen began his acting career on stage with the J. C. Williamson organisation, performing around Australia. In 1912 he left Australia for North America. In the United States, Allen was a member of a touring theater company, known for their popular rendition of The Better 'Ole. He appeared on Broadway in the early 1920s.

Allen's first film role was in the 1923 silent film, The Last Moment, in a supporting role. In his career Allen appeared in over 100 films, mostly in supporting and smaller roles. Some of the more notable films he appeared in include: Of Human Bondage (1934), starring Bette Davis and Leslie Howard; the Marx Brothers' classic, A Night at the Opera; the original Mutiny on the Bounty (1935), starring Charles Laughton and Clark Gable; William Wyler's 1942 Academy Award-winning film, Mrs. Miniver, starring Greer Garson, Walter Pidgeon, and Teresa Wright; Jane Eyre (1944), starring Orson Welles and Joan Fontaine; the Mickey Rooney and Elizabeth Taylor version of National Velvet (1945); and The Picture of Dorian Gray (1945), starring George Sanders. His final appearance on film was in the 1949 film, Challenge to Lassie, starring Edmund Gwenn.

== Personal life ==
In 1910, Allen married fellow actor Marjorie Josephine née Condon in Brisbane. The union was not a success and he went to North America without her, in 1912, with an Australian court granting her a divorce for abandonment in 1915. He and his second wife, Gertrude Dorothea (née Hyde), had two children, Harry Jr. and Paula.

== Filmography ==
(Per AFI database)

- The Last Moment (1923) as Pat Rooney
- The Enchanted Cottage (1924) as Riggs
- Ella Cinders (1926)
- Corporal Kate (1926)
- Turkish Delight (1927)
- The Scorcher (1927)
- The Silent Hero (1927)
- The Adorable Cheat (1928)
- The Wreck of the Singapore (1928)
- Sweet Sixteen (1928)
- Two Lovers (1928)
- In Old California (1929) as Sgt. Washburn
- Strange Cargo (1929) as Short
- The Dawn Patrol (1930) as Allen - Mechanic (uncredited)
- Headin' North (1930)
- Hell Harbor (1930) as Peg Leg
- Hell's Island (1930) as Bert
- Second Honeymoon (1930) as Sheriff
- Sunny (1930) as Side Show Barker (uncredited)
- Chances (1931)
- Rich Man's Folly (1931)
- Texas Pioneers (1932)
- The Fourth Horseman (1932)
- Fugitive Road (1934)
- The House of Rothschild (1934)
- Of Human Bondage (1934)
- The Silver Streak (1934)
- What Every Woman Knows (1934)
- Riptide (1934)
- Bombay Mail (1934)
- A Night at the Opera (1935) as Doorman (uncredited)
- A Feather in Her Hat (1935)
- The Perfect Gentleman (1935)
- Mutiny on the Bounty (1935) as Wherryman (uncredited)
- The Great Impersonation (1935) as Perkins
- Anna Karenina (1935) as Cord
- Libeled Lady (1936)
- The Return of Sophie Lang (1936) as Graveyard Caretaker (uncredited)
- Angels in White (1936)
- The White Angel (1936)
- Love on the Run (1936) as Chauffeur (uncredited)
- The Girl from Mandalay (1936)
- Lloyd's of London (1936) as Waiter (uncredited)
- London by Night (1937)
- California Straight Ahead (1937)
- A Girl with Ideas (1937)
- Outside of Paradise (1938)
- Bulldog Drummond in Africa (1938)
- Holiday (1938)
- Reckless Living (1938)
- Mysterious Mr. Moto (1938) as Taxi Driver (uncredited)
- Stand Up and Fight (1939)
- The Little Princess (1939)
- I'm from Missouri (1939)
- Rulers of the Sea (1939)
- We Are Not Alone (1939)
- Zaza (1939)
- The Earl of Chicago (1940)
- Waterloo Bridge (1940)
- Moon over Burma (1940)
- Blossoms in the Dust (1941)
- One Night in Lisbon (1941)
- Rage in Heaven (1941)
- They Met in Bombay (1941) as Soldier in Saloon (uncredited)
- A Yank in the R.A.F. (1941) as Air Raid Warden (uncredited)
- Eagle Squadron (1942)
- Mrs. Miniver (1942) as William (uncredited)
- Random Harvest (1942)
- This Above All (1942)
- Forever and a Day (1943) as First Cockney Air Raid Watcher
- The Man from Down Under (1943)
- Two Tickets to London (1943)
- Buckskin Frontier (1943) as McWhinny
- Jane Eyre (1943) as Guard (uncredited)
- The White Cliffs of Dover (1944)
- The Hour Before the Dawn (1944)
- The Canterville Ghost (1944)
- The Lodger (1944)
- Ministry of Fear (1944)
- Passport to Destiny (1944)
- The Scarlet Claw (1944)
- You Can't Ration Love (1944) as Pop (uncredited)
- National Velvet (1944) as Van Driver (uncredited)
- Confidential Agent (1945)
- Hangover Square (1945)
- Love Letters (1945)
- Murder, He Says (1945)
- The Picture of Dorian Gray (1945)
- Scotland Yard Investigator (1945) as Watchman (uncredited)
- The Green Years (1946)
- Bulldog Drummond at Bay (1947) as Postman (uncredited)
- The Imperfect Lady (1947)
- Bob, Son of Battle (1947)
- The Swordsman (1948)
- The Emperor Waltz (1948) as Gamekeeper (uncredited)
- Julia Misbehaves (1948) as Bill Collector (uncredited)
- Kiss the Blood Off My Hands (1948)
- Night Has a Thousand Eyes (1948) as MacDougall (uncredited)
- Challenge to Lassie (1949) as Shepherd (uncredited)
- The Secret Garden (1949)
- Take Me Out to the Ball Game (1949)
- Gun Cargo (1949) as Peg Leg
