= Ralph Ince =

American film director (1887–1937)

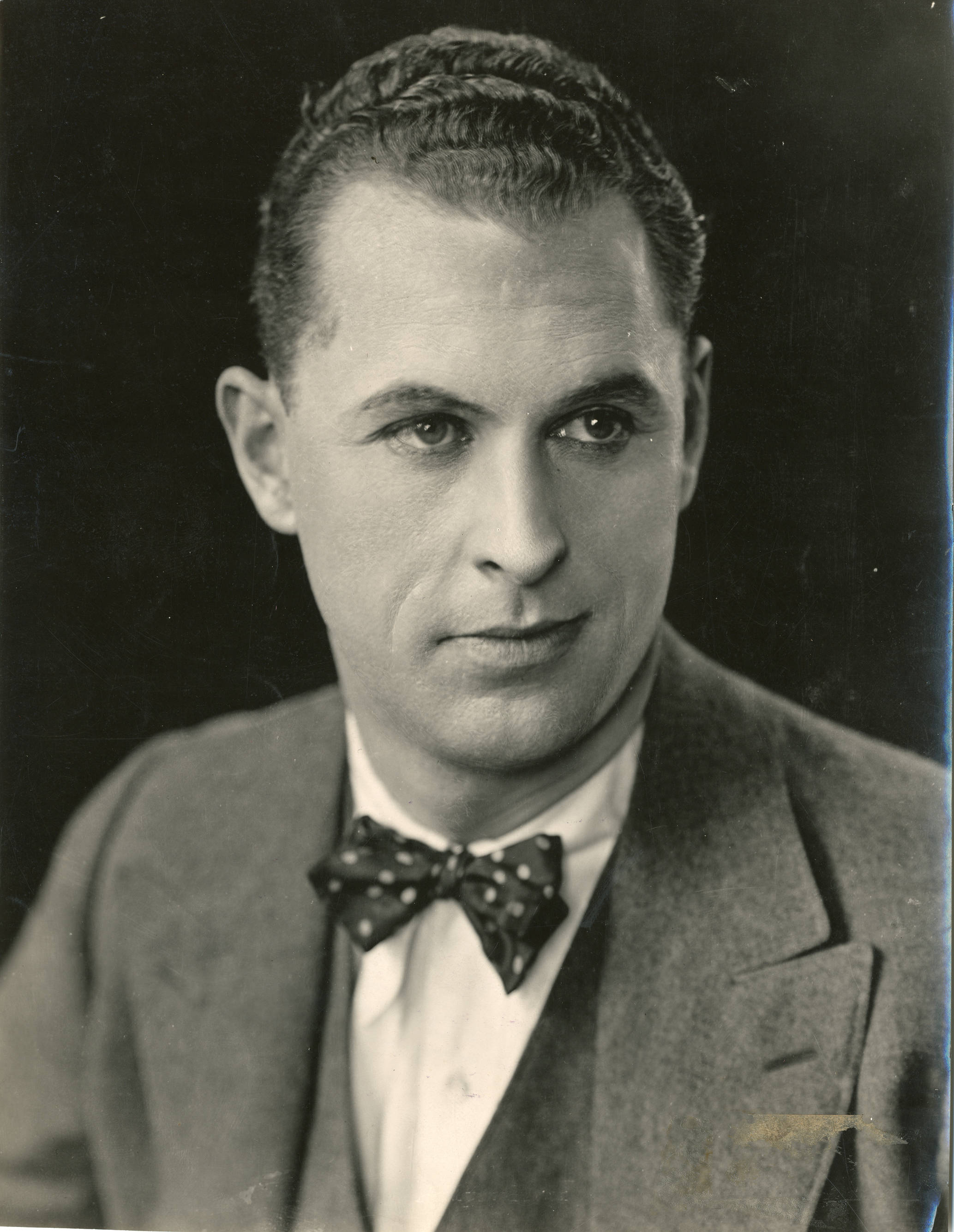
- Ince in 1923
- Born: Ralph Waldo Ince; January 16, 1887; Boston, Massachusetts, US
- Died: April 10, 1937 (aged 50); London, England
- Occupations: Film director, actor, screenwriter
- Years active: 1907–1937
- Spouses: Lucille Lee Stewart (m. 1910; div. 1925) Rosa Castro (es) (m. 1926; div. 1932) Helen Tigges (m. 1932)
- Children: 1
- Relatives: John E. Ince, Sr. (father); John E. Ince, Jr. (brother); Thomas H. Ince (brother)

Ralph Waldo Ince (January 16, 1887 – April 10, 1937) was an American pioneer film actor, director and screenwriter whose career began near the dawn of the silent film era. Ralph Ince was the son of actor John E. Ince, Sr. and brother of actors John E. Ince, Jr. and Thomas H. Ince.

== Biography ==
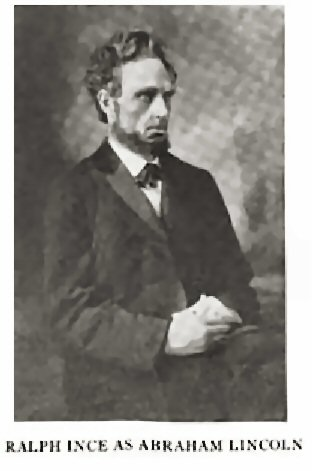
Theatre of Science, 1914

Ralph Ince was born on January 16, 1887, in Boston, the youngest of three sons and a daughter raised by English immigrants, John and Emma Ince. Sometime after his birth Ince moved to Manhattan where his entire family was engaged in theater work; his father as a musical agent and mother, sister Bertha and brothers, John and Thomas as actors. Ralph Ince studied art with cartoonist Dan McCarthy and for a while worked as a newspaper cartoonist for the New York World and later magazine illustrator for the New York Mirror and The Evening Telegram. At times over his acting and directing career Ince would continue to contribute cartoons to popular magazines of the day. Early on in his career Ince, who had done some stage acting as a child, was a member of Richard Mansfield's stock company playing parts in The College Widow and Ben Hur.

Around 1906, Ince became an animator in the fledgling film industry working for Winsor McCay, but soon turned to acting and joined Vitagraph Studios where he became known for his portrayals of Abraham Lincoln in a series of one reel films. Ince began directing at Vitagraph around 1910 and was officially advanced to the director's chair in 1912, though he still continued to act in many of his films and throughout his career. Ince would go on to direct some 171 films between 1910 and 1937 and appear in approximately 110 films over nearly the same time period.

Ince became a member of The Lambs Club in 1916, and his brother John joined in 1919.

== Marriage ==
Ince married three times, first to Vitagraph player Lucille Lee Stewart, sister of actress Anita Stewart. Their fifteen-year marriage ended in 1925, two years after she had left him. The following year he married Rosa Castro Martinez (stage name Lucille Mendez), an 18-year-old Venezuelan stage and screen actress, daughter of Venezuelan President Cipriano Castro. This union ended in 1932 after she claimed Ince damaged her career by not allowing her to accept certain job offers. Ince's last wife was Helen Ruth Tigges, a native of Frazee, Minnesota. She was the mother of his only child, born just months before Ince's death at age fifty.

== Death ==
Ralph Ince died in London, on April 10, 1937, aged 50, when a car his wife was driving struck an iron standard near their residence in the Kensington district of London, England. The force of the impact, though not great, proved fatal to Ince when his head struck the dashboard. Helen Ince suffered cuts and bruises that required hospitalization. Ince and his wife had moved to Britain shortly after they had married in 1932 to continue his film work there. Ince was cremated at Golders Green.

== Selected filmography ==
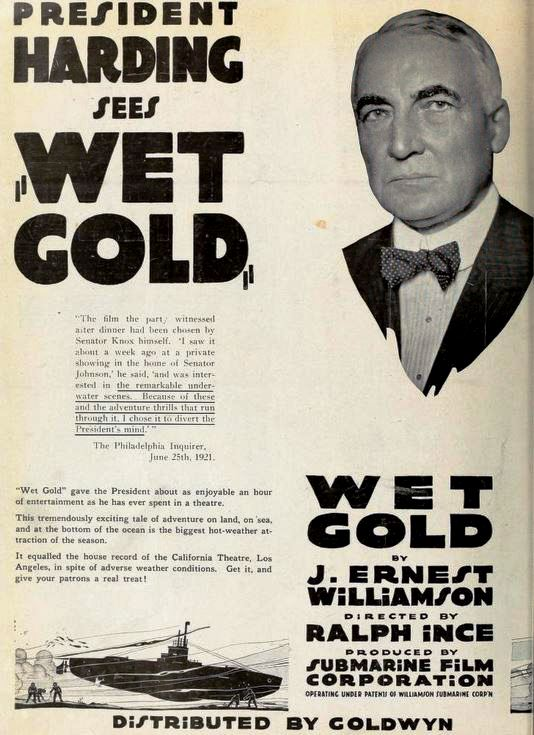
Ad for the American film Wet Gold with President Warren G. Harding, on back cover of the June 12, 1921 Film Daily

=== As director ===
- The Mills of the Gods (1912)
- My Lady's Slipper (1916)
- The Conflict (1916)
- The Co-Respondent (1917)
- Our Mrs. McChesney (1918)
- The Panther Woman (1918)
- The Eleventh Commandment (1918)
- Five Thousand an Hour (1918)
- Sealed Hearts (1919)
- Two Women (1919)
- The Perfect Lover (1919)
- Red Foam (1920)
- Out of the Snows (1920)
- His Wife's Money (1920)
- Tropical Love (1921)
- The Highest Law (1921)
- After Midnight (1921)
- Remorseless Love (1921)
- A Man's Home (1921)
- Wet Gold (1921)
- A Wide Open Town (1922)
- Reckless Youth (1922)
- The Referee (1922)
- Counterfeit Love (1923)
- The Chorus Lady (1924)
- The House of Youth (1924)
- The Uninvited Guest (1924)
- Lady Robinhood (1925)
- Smooth as Satin (1925)
- Alias Mary Flynn (1925)
- The Better Way (1926)
- The Lone Wolf Returns (1926)
- Breed of the Sea (1926)
- The Sea Wolf (1926)
- Bigger Than Barnum's (1926)
- Home Struck (1927)
- South Sea Love (1927)
- Shanghaied (1927)
- Enemies of Society (1927)
- Not for Publication (1927)
- Coney Island (1928)
- Chicago After Midnight (1928)
- Hit of the Show (1928)
- The Wreck of the Singapore (1928)
- Danger Street (1928)
- A Real Girl (1929)
- Hurricane (1929)
- Lucky Devils (1933)
- Murder at Monte Carlo (1934)
- A Glimpse of Paradise (1934)
- Love at Second Sight (1934)
- What's in a Name? (1934)
- No Escape (1934)
- Crime Unlimited (1935)
- Rolling Home (1935)
- The Black Mask (1935)
- Blue Smoke (1935)
- Gaol Break (1936)
- Fair Exchange (1936)
- Twelve Good Men (1936)
- Jury's Evidence (1936)
- Hail and Farewell (1936)
- It's You I Want (1936)
- The Perfect Crime (1937)
- The Vulture (1937)
- Side Street Angel (1937)

=== As actor ===
- Jean the Match-Maker (1910, Short)
- A Tale of Two Cities (1911, Short) – (uncredited)
- The Child Crusoes (1911, Short)
- The Sins of the Mothers (1914) – Mr. Raymond
- The Land of Opportunity (1920) – Abraham Lincoln
- Out of the Snows (1920) – Robert Holliday
- The Bringers (1920)
- The Highest Law (1921) – Abraham Lincoln
- The Last Door (1921)
- Wet Gold (1921) – John Cromwell
- Channing of the Northwest (1922)
- Yellow Fingers (1926) – Brute Shane
- Bigger Than Barnum's (1926) – Carl Ravelle
- The Sea Wolf (1926) – 'Wolf' Larsen
- Breed of the Sea (1926) – Tod Pembroke, aka Captain Blaze Devine
- The Better Way (1926) – Billy
- Not for Publication (1927) – 'Big Dick' Wellman
- Shanghaied (1927) – Hurricane Haley
- Chicago After Midnight (1928) – Jim Boyd
- The Wreck of the Singapore (1928) – Kelsey
- Wall Street (1929) – Roller McCray
- The Big Fight (1930) – Chuck
- Numbered Men (1930) – 33410
- Little Caesar (1931) – Pete Montana
- Gentleman's Fate (1931) – Dante
- Hell Bound (1931) – Dorgan
- The Star Witness (1931) – 'Maxey' Campo
- The Big Gamble (1931) – Webb
- The Law of the Sea (1931) – Marty Drake
- Men of Chance (1931) – Farley
- The Big Shot (1931) – Butch (uncredited)
- Girl of the Rio (1932) – O'Grady
- The Hatchet Man (1932) – 'Big Jim' Malone (uncredited)
- Law and Order (1932) – Poe Northrup
- The Lost Squadron (1932) – Jettick
- The County Fair (1932) – Diamond Barnett
- State's Attorney (1932) – Defense Attorney
- The Mouthpiece (1932) – J.B. Roscoe
- The Tenderfoot (1932) – Dolan
- Gorilla Ship (1932) – Capt. 'Gorilla' Larsen
- Guilty as Hell (1932) – Jack Reed
- The Pride of the Legion (1932) – Klafki
- Malay Nights (1932) – Jack Sheldon
- Men of America (1932) – Cicero
- Havana Widows (1933) – G.W. 'Butch' O'Neill
- Love at Second Sight (1934) – Mackintosh
- No Escape (1934) – Lucky
- So You Won't Talk (1935) – Ralph Younger
- Rolling Home (1935) – Wally
- Blue Smoke (1935) – Al Dempson
- Gaol Break (1936) – Jim Oakley
- Perfect Crime (1937) – Jim Lanahan
