= Danger Street (1928 film) =

1928 film

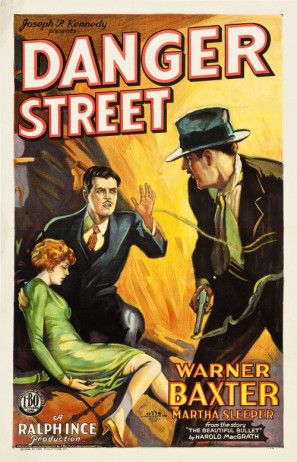
- Directed by: Ralph Ince
- Written by: Enid Hibbard; Harold McGrath
- Cinematography: Robert Martin
- Edited by: George M. Arthur
- Production company: FBO
- Distributed by: FBO
- Release date: August 26, 1928
- Country: United States
- Languages: Silent; English intertitles

Danger Street is a 1928 American silent drama film directed by Ralph Ince and starring Warner Baxter, Martha Sleeper and Duke Martin.

== Cast ==
- Warner Baxter as Rolly Sigsby
- Martha Sleeper as Kitty
- Duke Martin as Dorgan
- Frank Mills as Bull
- Harry Tenbrook as Borg
- Harry Allen Grant as Bauer
- Ole M. Ness as Cloom
- Spec O'Donnell as Sammy

== Bibliography ==
- Quinlan, David. The Illustrated Guide to Film Directors. Batsford, 1983.
