= Not for Publication (1927 film) =

1927 film by Ralph Ince

- Directed by: Ralph Ince
- Written by: Ewart Adamson
- Produced by: Ralph Ince
- Cinematography: Allen G. Siegler
- Production company: Ralph Ince Productions
- Distributed by: FBO
- Release date: August 31, 1927
- Country: United States
- Languages: Silent; English intertitles

Not for Publication is a 1927 American silent film directed by and starring Ralph Ince.

== Cast ==
- Ralph Ince as 'Big Dick' Wellman
- Roy Laidlaw as Commissioner Brownell
- Rex Lease as Philip Hale
- Jola Mendez as Beryl Wellman
- Eugene Strong as Eli Barker

== Bibliography ==
- Quinlan, David. The Illustrated Guide to Film Directors. Batsford, 1983.
