= The Argyle Case =

The Argyle Case may refer to:

- The Argyle Case (1929 film), a murder horror film
- The Argyle Case (1917 film), an American silent film
