= Laura Anson =

American actress

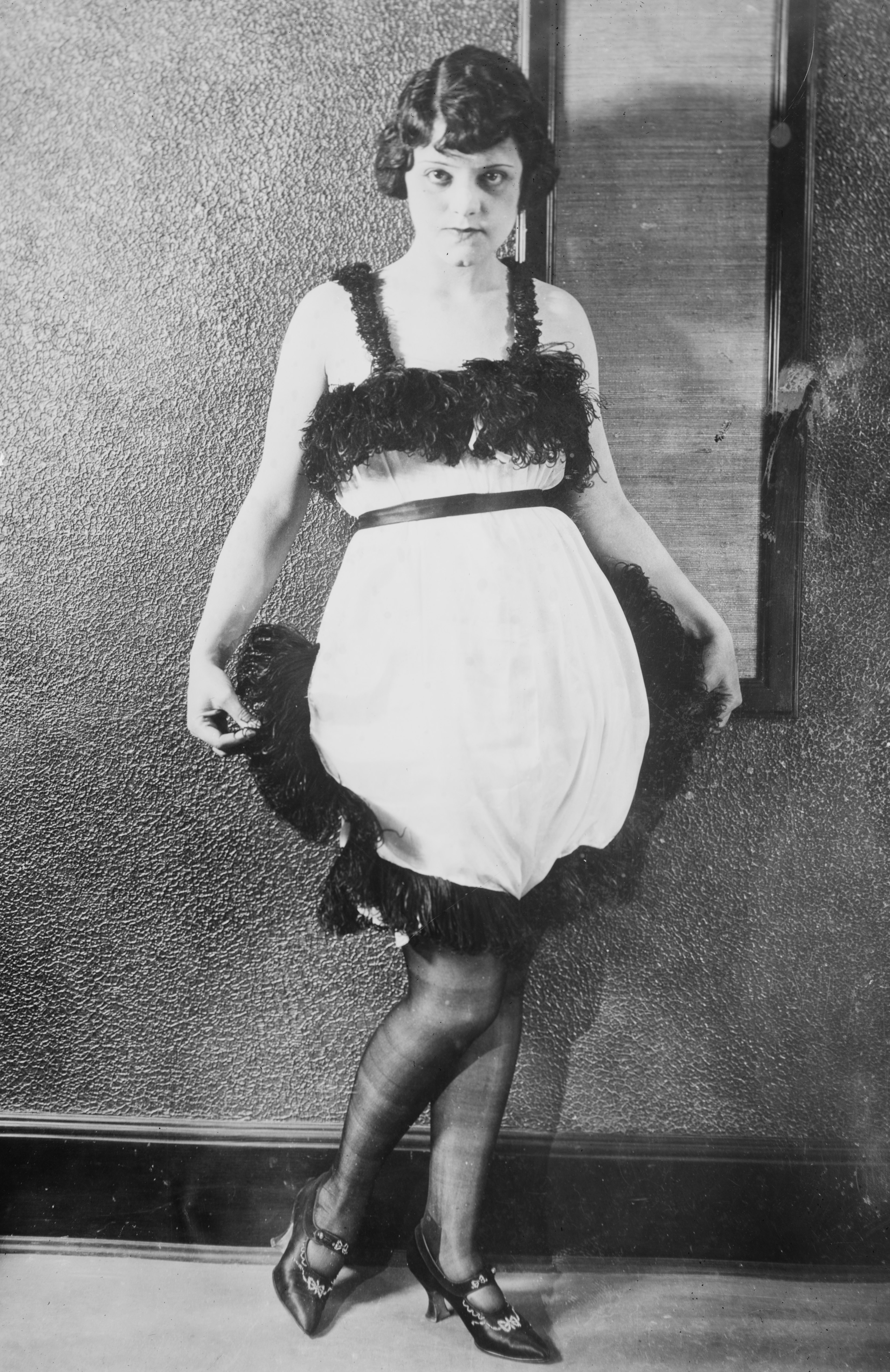
- Laura Anson in a costume fringed with ostrich feathers, 1921
- Born: Lura Lillian Kuhlman; January 2, 1892; Nebraska City, Nebraska
- Died: July 15, 1968 (age 76); Woodland Hills, California
- Other names: Pauline Anson, Pauline McCullough, Lura McCullough
- Occupation: Actress
- Spouse: Philo McCullough

Laura Anson McCullough (January 2, 1892 – July 15, 1968), born Lura Lillian Kuhlman, was an American actress in silent films, mostly Westerns and crime dramas.

== Early life and education ==
Lura Kuhlman was born in Nebraska City, Nebraska, the daughter of Adolph J. Kuhlman and Barbara Alleman Kuhlman. Her father was a businessman. Both of her parents moved to Los Angeles in 1920; they both died, at her residence, in 1923 and 1924.

== Career ==
Anson was a stage actress as a young woman. She moved to Los Angeles by 1920, and appeared in about a dozen silent films between 1920 and 1923, mostly Westerns and crime dramas. Her co-stars included Roscoe Arbuckle, Lila Lee, Thomas Meighan, Pauline Starke, Richard Dix, and Buck Jones. She worked with Cecil B. DeMille, Tom Forman, Charles Maigne, and Scott R. Dunlap, among other directors and producers.

Anson's style was a matter of press interest. In 1920 she experimented with using henna coloring instead of hosiery (so that her legs and feet were, except for the henna and some sandals, bare). "Why, I just got tired of paying out a lot of money for silk stockings," she explained, "and finally solved a way to cut them out." In 1921, her ostrich feather-trimmed lingerie made the news.

== Films ==
- Sweet Lavender (1920)
- The Easy Road (1921)
- The Little Clown (1921)
- The Affairs of Anatol (1921)
- Crazy to Marry (1921)
- Bluebeard, Jr. (1922)
- The Great Alone (1922)
- If You Believe It, It's So (1922)
- Flames of Passion (1923)
- Skid Proof (1923)
- The Silent Partner (1923)
- The Call of the Canyon (1923)
- The Way of the Transgressor (1923)

== Personal life ==
Anson married three times. Her first husband was Roy J. Anderson. They married in Iowa in 1910 and soon divorced. Her second husband was dentist John Franklin Anson. They married in Nebraska in 1913 and she used his surname professionally after they divorced in 1921. She married fellow actor Philo McCullough in 1939, in Arizona. She was also named as party in the 1921–1922 divorce of director Jacques Jaccard and actress Helen Leslie. She died in 1968, at the age of 76, in Woodland Hills, California. Her grave is in Forest Lawn Memorial Park in the Hollywood Hills.
