= The Call of the Canyon =

The Call of the Canyon may refer to:

- The Call of the Canyon (novel), a 1924 novel by Zane Grey
  - The Call of the Canyon (film), a 1923 American silent Western film, based on the novel

== See also ==
- Call of the Canyon, a 1942 American Western film
