= Hugh Stowell Scott =

English novelist (1862–1903)

- Born: 9 May 1862; Newcastle upon Tyne, England
- Died: 19 November 1903 (aged 41); Melton, Suffolk, England
- Occupation: Novelist
- Spouse: Ethel Frances Hall (m. 1889)
- Writing career
- Pen name: Henry Seton Merriman

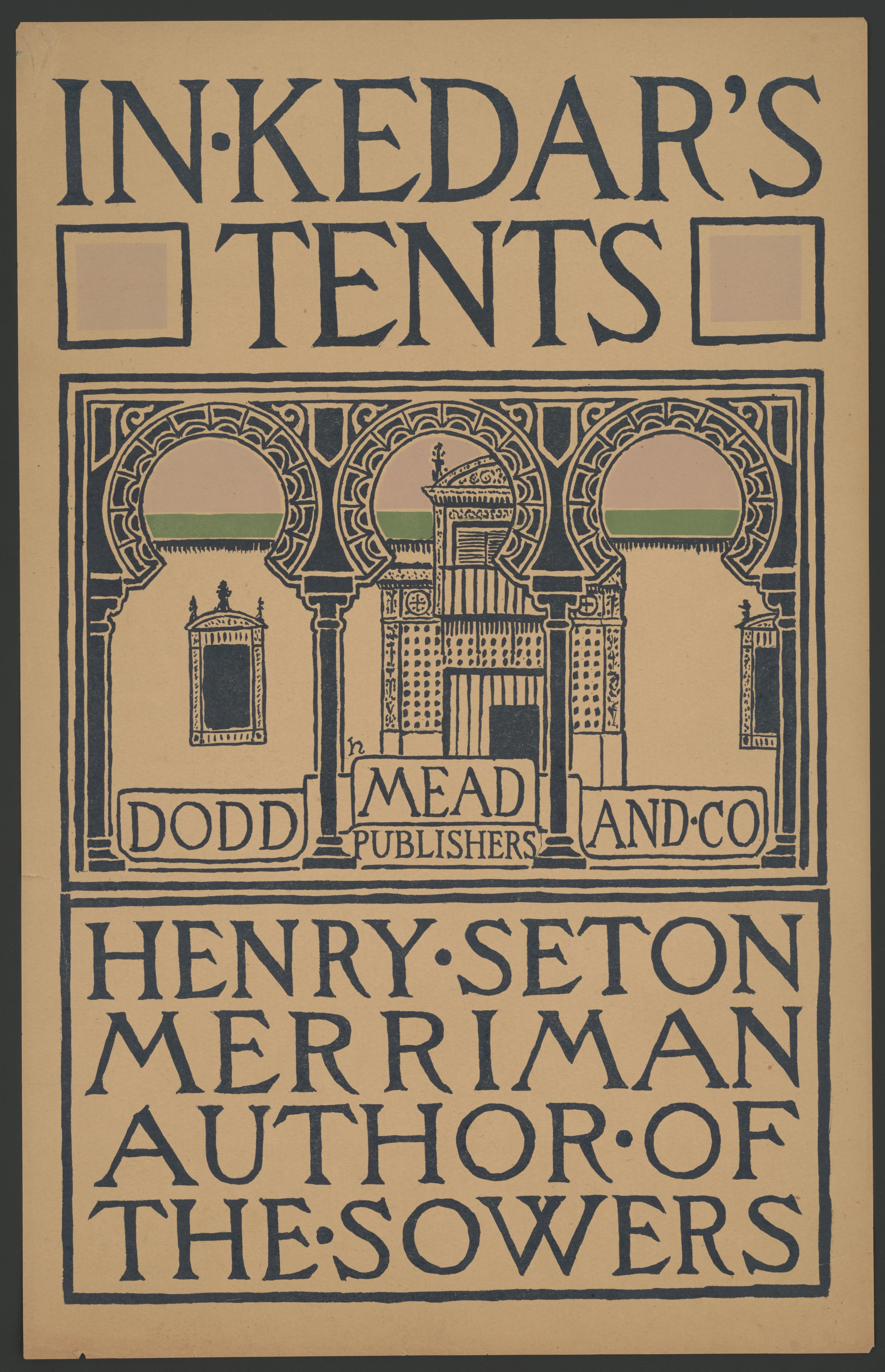
In Kedar's Tents (1897)

Hugh Stowell Scott (9 May 1862 – 19 November 1903) was an English novelist who wrote under the pseudonym of Henry Seton Merriman. His best known novel, The Sowers went through thirty UK editions.

== Life ==
Born in Newcastle upon Tyne, he became an underwriter at Lloyd's of London, but then took to travel and writing novels, many of which had great popularity. Scott visited India as a tourist in 1877–1878 and set his novel Flotsam (1896) there. He was an enthusiastic traveller, many of his journeys being made with his friend and fellow author Stanley J. Weyman.

Scott married Ethel Frances Hall (1865–1943) on 19 June 1889. They had no children. Scott was unusually modest and retiring in character. He died of appendicitis in 1903, aged 41, at Melton, Suffolk. Scott left £5000 in his will to Evelyn Beatrice Hall, his sister-in-law and a fellow writer, best known for a biographical work, The Friends of Voltaire. Scott explained the legacy as a "token of my gratitude for her continued assistance and literary advice, without which I should never have been able to have made a living by my pen."

He worked with great care, and his best books held a high place in Victorian fiction. His book The Sowers was made into a silent film in 1916.

== Novels ==
His first novel, Young Mistley was published anonymously in 1888. His other novels include: The Phantom Future (his only novel set entirely in England, 1888), Suspense (1890), The Slave of the Lamp (1892), From One Generation to Another (1892), With Edged Tools (a bestseller in 1894), The Sowers (generally considered his best, set in Russia, where it was banned, 1896), The Grey Lady (1897), In Kedar's Tents (1897), Roden's Corner (1898), Dross (1899), The Isle of Unrest (1900), The Velvet Glove (1902), The Vultures (1902), Queen (1903), Barlasch of the Guard (a Napoleonic novel set mainly in Danzig, 1903) and The Last Hope (1904).

== Bibliography ==
- Young Mistley (1888)
- The Phantom Future (1888)
- Suspense (1890)
- Prisoners and Captives (1891)
- The Slave of the Lamp (1892)
- From One Generation to Another (1892)
- Well Meant (1892)
- Sister (1892)
- A Pair of Dark Horses (1893)
- In Countermine B (1893)
- The Slowcoach (1893)
- In a Caravan (1893)
- From Wisdom Court (with Stephen G. Tallentyre, 1893)
- The Panther (1894)
- The Haunted Hand (1894)
- Crab-Appleby (1894)
- Hand and Heart (1894)
- Putting Things Right (1894)
- With Edged Tools (1894)
- At the Front (1894)
- A Friend in Need (1895)
- The Lie That Tony Told (1895)
- "The Morning Star" (1895)
- In the Track of the Wandering Jew (1895)
- The Money-Spinner and other Character Notes (with Stephen G. Tallentyre, illustrations by Arthur Rackham, 1896)
- Flotsam (1896)
- Through the Gate of Tears (1896)
- The Sowers (1896)
- A Pariah (1896)
- The Prodigal's Return (1896)
- The Carnival in Spain (1896)
- Last Year's Nest (1896)
- On the Brink (1896)
- Of This Generation (1896)
- The Grey Lady (with illustrations by Arthur Rackham, 1897)
- After Many Days (1897)
- In Kedar's Tents (1897)
- In the Valley of Repose (1898)
- On the Rocks (1898)
- Roden's Corner (1898)
- Dross (1899)
- Tomaso's Fortune (1899)
- The Isle of Unrest (1900)
- A Small World (1900)
- An Old Custom (1901)
- The Velvet Glove (1902)
- The Vultures (1902)
- Queen (1903)
- Barlasch of the Guard (1903)
- The Last Hope (1904)

Uncollected magazine stories:

- For Juanita's Sake
- The End of the "Mooroo"
- Golossa-a-l
- The Mule
- In Love and War
- Stranded
- In a Crooked Way
- The Tale of a Scorpion
