= The Bachelor Daddy =

1922 film by Alfred E. Green

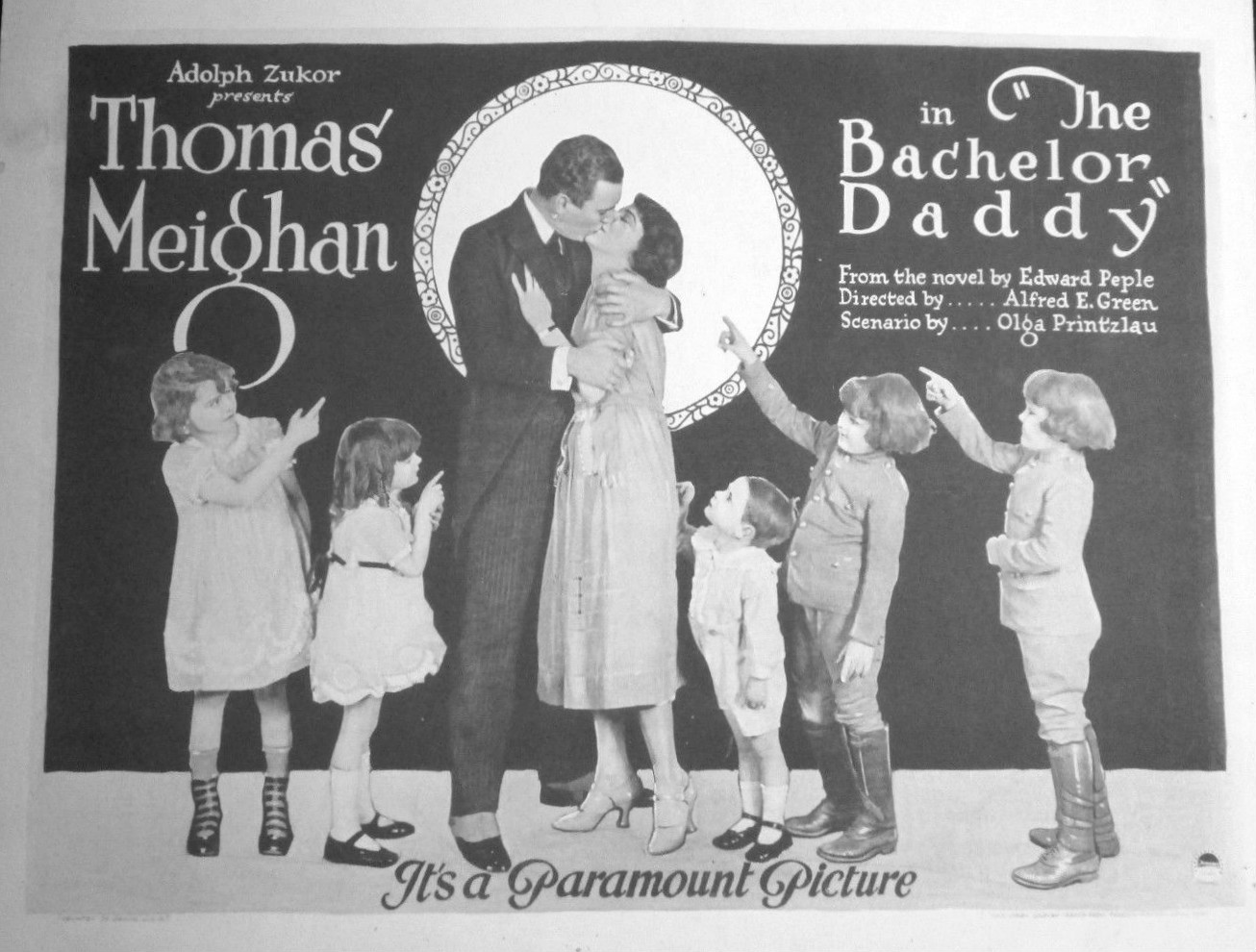
- Lobby card
- Directed by: Alfred E. Green
- Screenplay by: Edward Peple; Olga Printzlau
- Produced by: Adolph Zukor
- Starring: Thomas Meighan; Leatrice Joy; Maude Wayne; Adele Farrington; J. Farrell MacDonald; Larry Wheat; Peaches Jackson
- Cinematography: William Marshall; Gilbert Warrenton
- Production company: Famous Players–Lasky Corporation
- Distributed by: Paramount Pictures
- Release date: April 29, 1922
- Running time: 60 minutes
- Country: United States
- Language: Silent (English intertitles)

The Bachelor Daddy is a lost 1922 American silent comedy film directed by Alfred E. Green and written by Edward Peple and Olga Printzlau. The film stars Thomas Meighan, Leatrice Joy, Maude Wayne, Adele Farrington, J. Farrell MacDonald, Larry Wheat, and Peaches Jackson. The film was released on April 29, 1922, by Paramount Pictures.

== Plot ==
As described in a film magazine, following the death of his mining partner Joe Pelton, wealthy bachelor Richard Chester adopts Joe's five young children and takes them east by train. The tots upset the equanimity of the passengers of the Pullman car en route to New York City, and when they arrive at Richard's home they almost drive the servants distracted. He puts them all in school except for the youngest. His fiancé Ethel McVae, a cold society woman, refuses to have anything to do with the children and breaks their engagement when she sees how Richard reacts when his stenographer Sally Lockwood helps him nurse the youngest child through a night's illness. The secretary wins Richard's love through the baby.

== Cast ==
- Thomas Meighan as Richard Chester
- Leatrice Joy as Sally Lockwood
- Maude Wayne as Ethel McVae
- Adele Farrington as Mrs. McVae
- J. Farrell MacDonald as Joe Pelton
- Larry Wheat as Charles Henley
- Peaches Jackson as Nita
- Barbara Maier as Buddie
- Bruce Guerin as Toodles
- Charles De Briac as David
- Raymond De Briac as Donald
