= The Man Who Saw Tomorrow (1922 film) =

1922 film

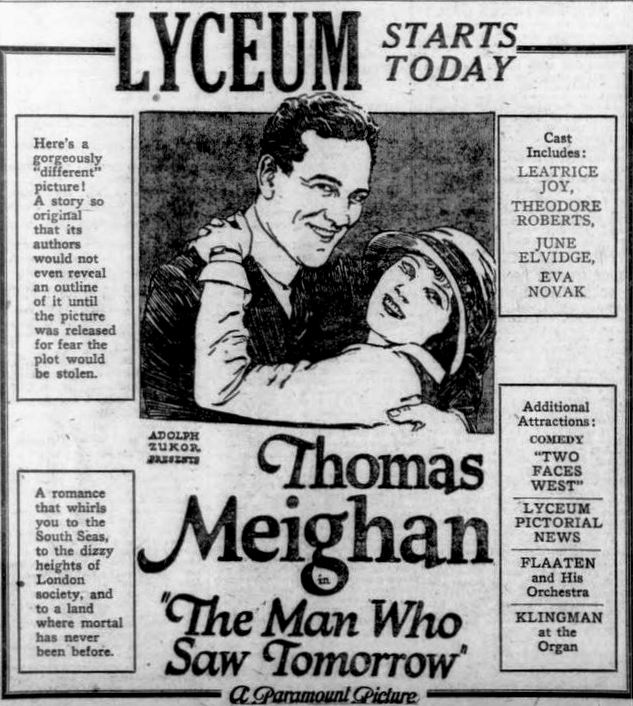
- Newspaper ad
- Directed by: Alfred E. Green
- Screenplay by: Frank Condon; Will M. Ritchey; Perley Poore Sheehan
- Produced by: Adolph Zukor
- Starring: Thomas Meighan; Theodore Roberts; Leatrice Joy; Alan Roscoe; Alec B. Francis; June Elvidge; Eva Novak
- Cinematography: Alvin Wyckoff
- Production company: Famous Players–Lasky Corporation
- Distributed by: Paramount Pictures
- Release date: October 29, 1922
- Running time: 70 minutes
- Country: United States
- Language: Silent (English intertitles)

The Man Who Saw Tomorrow is a lost 1922 American silent drama film directed by Alfred E. Green and written by Frank Condon, Will M. Ritchey, and Perley Poore Sheehan. The film stars Thomas Meighan, Theodore Roberts, Leatrice Joy, Alan Roscoe, Alec B. Francis, June Elvidge, and Eva Novak. The film was released on October 29, 1922, by Paramount Pictures.

== Cast ==
- Thomas Meighan as Burke Hammond
- Theodore Roberts as Captain Morgan Pring
- Leatrice Joy as Rita Pring
- Alan Roscoe as Jim McLeod
- Alec B. Francis as Sir William De Vry
- June Elvidge as Lady Helen Deene
- Eva Novak as Vonia
- Larry Wheat as Larry Camden
- John Miltern as Professor Jansen
- Robert Brower as Bishop
- Edward Patrick as Botsu
- Jacqueline Dyrese as Maya
