= The Night Message =

1924 film

- Directed by: Perley Poore Sheehan
- Screenplay by: Raymond L. Schrock; Perley Poore Sheehan
- Starring: Howard Truesdale; Gladys Hulette; Charles Cruz; Margaret Seddon; Norman Rankow; Robert Gordon
- Cinematography: Jackson Rose
- Production company: Universal Pictures
- Distributed by: Universal Pictures
- Release date: March 17, 1924
- Running time: 50 minutes
- Country: United States
- Language: Silent (English intertitles)

The Night Message is a 1924 American silent drama film directed by Perley Poore Sheehan and written by Raymond L. Schrock and Perley Poore Sheehan. The film stars Howard Truesdale, Gladys Hulette, Charles Cruz, Margaret Seddon, Norman Rankow, and Robert Gordon. The film was released on March 17, 1924, by Universal Pictures.

== Plot ==
As described in a film magazine review, the Lefferts and Longstreet families live in a southern mountain region and are enemies. Elsie Lefferts and Lee Longstreet are sweethearts Old Man Lefferts favors the suit of telegraph operator Lem Beeman. The latter, while hunting, accididentally shoots Elsie's brother, Harney. Lee is blamed for the killing and is arrested and sentenced to death. The telegraph wires are down in a storm when Lem decides to confess. He reaches the prison in time to save Lee but is himself killed. The lovers are reunited.

== Cast ==
- Howard Truesdale as 'Old Man' Lefferts
- Gladys Hulette as Elsie Lefferts
- Charles Cruz as Lee Longstreet
- Margaret Seddon as Mrs. Longstreet
- Norman Rankow as Harney Lefferts
- Robert Gordon as Hank Lefferts
- Edgar Kennedy as Lem Beeman
- Joseph W. Girard as Gov. Pringle
