= Perley Poore Sheehan =

American writer and film director (1875–1943)

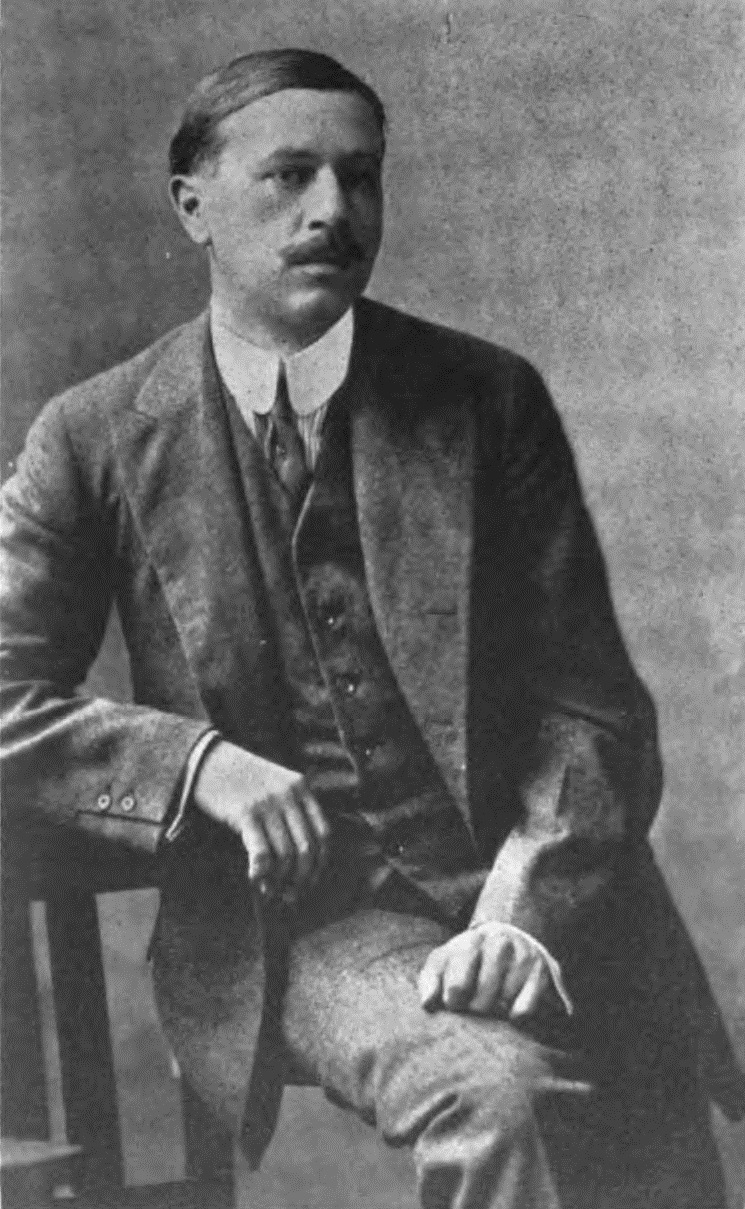

Perley Poore Sheehan (7 June 1875 in Cincinnati, Ohio, United States – 30 September 1943 in Sierra Madre, California, United States) was an American film writer, novelist and film director. He was once married to Virginia Point (1902-unknown). Sheehan also wrote detective and adventure fiction for the pulp magazines. Sheehan wrote two fantasy novels, The Abyss of Wonders (1915), about a lost civilization in the Gobi Desert, and The Red Road to Shamballah (1932–1933) about a hero with a Tibetan magic sword.

Sheehan was cited as editor of Munsey's The Scrap Book by researcher Sam Moskowitz. Moskowitz noted him as editor in 1906, 1909, and 1911, essentially the complete run of the magazine.

== Works ==
=== Filmography as a film writer ===
(note: most of manuscripts below are movies, which are based on his novels.)

- The Dragon (1916)
- The Bugler of Algiers (1916)
- The Whispering Chorus (1918)
- Brave and Bold (1918)
- A Society Sensation (1918)
- Upstairs (1919)
- Three Sevens (1921)
- For Those We Love (1921)
- If You Believe It, It's So (1922)
- Always the Woman (1922)
- The Old Homestead (1922)
- The Man Who Saw Tomorrow (1922)
- The Hunchback of Notre Dame (1923)
- The Night Message (1924)
- Love and Glory (1924)
- The Way of All Flesh (1927)
- The Lost City (1935)

=== Filmography as a film director ===
- The Night Message (1924)

=== Plays ===
- Efficiency (with Robert H. Davis) (1917). This may have been developed from the playscript published by Sheehan and Robert H Davis in The Strand Magazine in 1917, 'Blood and Iron'.

=== Novels ===
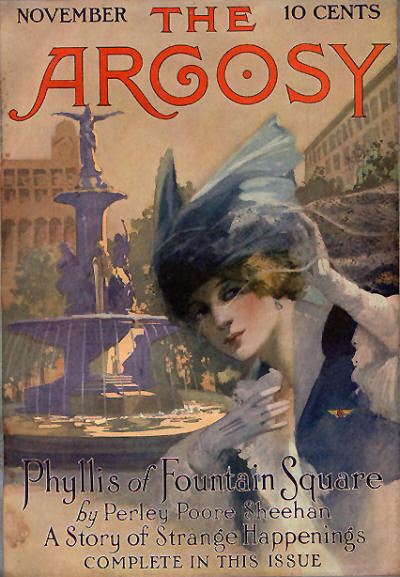
Sheehan's "Phyllis of Fountain Square" was the cover story in the November 1916 issue of The Argosy

- Seer (1912)
- The Prophet (1912)
- The Copper Princess (1913) [to be reprinted by Murania Press]
- We are French! (with Robert H. Davis) (1914)
- The Woman of the Pyramid (1914) [reprinted by Steeger Books]
- The Abyss of Wonders (1915) [reprinted by Murania Press]
- Those Who Walk in Darkness (1917) [reprinted by Fiction House Press]
- Passport invisible (1918)
- The One Gift (1920)
- House with a Bad Name (1920) [reprinted by Fiction House Press]
- Three Sevens: A Detective Story (1927) [New York City: Chelsea House]
- The Whispering Chorus (1928)
- King Arthur (Chapbook) (1936)
- Heidi (Chapbook) (1936)
- Lola Montez, her pagan majesty, or, Queen errant (1936)
- Blennerhassett (Chapbook) (1937)

=== Short story collections ===
- Doctor Coffin: The Living Dead Man Off-Trail Publications (2007)
- The Red Road to Shamballah Black Dog Books (2008)
- The Leopard Man and Other Stories Pulpville Press
- Kwa of the Jungle (written as Paul Regard) Pulpville Press
- Abdullah, Achmed; Brand, Max; Means, E.K.; Sheehan, Perley Poore (1920). The Ten Foot Chain: Can Love Survive the Shackles? — A Unique Symposium. New York: Reynolds Publishing Company.
