= Held by the Law =

Lost 1927 crime film by Edward Laemmle

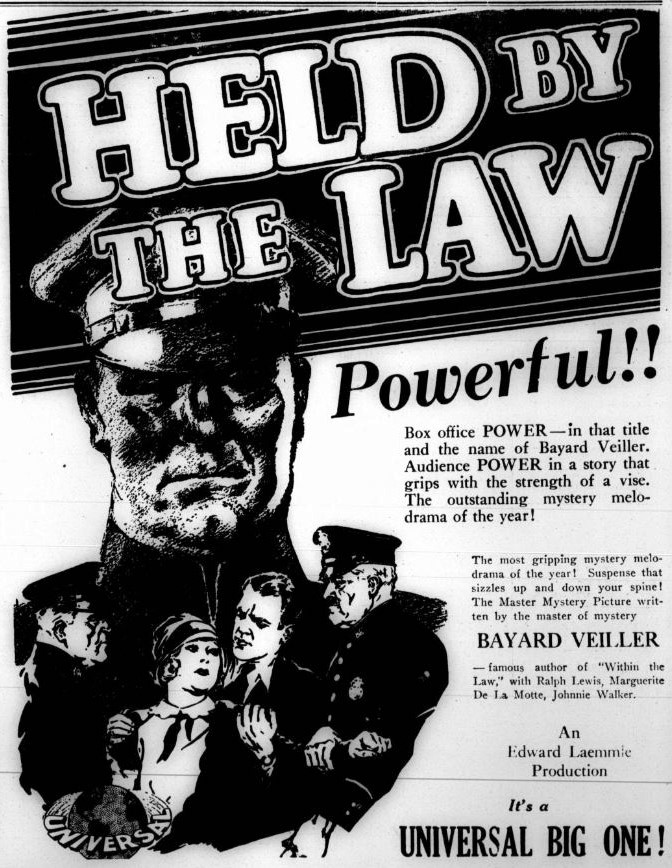
- Advertisement
- Directed by: Edward Laemmle
- Screenplay by: Charles Logue
- Story by: Bayard Veiller
- Starring: Ralph Lewis; Johnnie Walker; Marguerite De La Motte
- Cinematography: Jackson Rose
- Production company: Universal Pictures
- Distributed by: Universal Pictures
- Release date: April 10, 1927
- Running time: 76 minutes
- Country: United States
- Language: Silent (English intertitles)

Held by the Law is a 1927 American silent crime film directed by Edward Laemmle and written by Charles Logue. The film stars Ralph Lewis, Johnnie Walker, Marguerite De La Motte, Robert Ober, Fred Kelsey, and Maude Wayne. The film was released on April 10, 1927, by Universal Pictures.

== Plot ==
As described in a film magazine, tragedy replaces gaiety at the engagement party of Mary Travis and Tom Sinclair when his cousin, Boris Morton, a gentleman black sheep, facing exposure for the theft of a necklace from a member of the guests, shoots Sinclair's father in the back while the two fathers are drinking a toast in the library. Morton, with the cunning of desperation, casts the gun from his gloved hand into the room and joins the horrified guests as one of them. Tom Sinclair, stunned by the tragedy, unconsciously casts suspicion on Mary's father.

The only evidence against Morton, the real killer, is the glove with which he handled the gun. The detectives examine all the gloves of the guests, hoping to find one bearing the oily imprint of the gun handle, but Boris has dropped his gloves into a vase. As a result, Travis is tried, convicted of the murder, and sentenced to die.

Although Mary has broken the engagement, she turns to Tom in the last moments to save her father. She meets the young woman from whom Boris stole the necklace and learns that Tom's father was aware of the theft. She suspects the truth and enlists the aid of the detective who arrested her father. They lay a trap for Morton, who is induced to accompany Mary to the scene of the crime, ostensibly in the flimsy hope of unearthing new evidence that will free Travis. When Morton is left alone, he attempts to retrieve the tell-tale gloves and is arrested in the act by the detectives, who are waiting. Travis is saved from the electric chair and Mary and Tom are reconciled.

== Cast ==
- Ralph Lewis as George Travis
- Johnnie Walker as Tom Sinclair
- Marguerite De La Motte as Mary Travis
- Robert Ober as Boris Morton
- Fred Kelsey as Detective
- Maude Wayne as Ann
- E. J. Ratcliffe as Henry Sinclair

== Preservation ==
With no prints of Held by the Law located in any film archives, it is a lost film.
