= The Sowers =

1916 film by William C. deMille, Frank Reicher

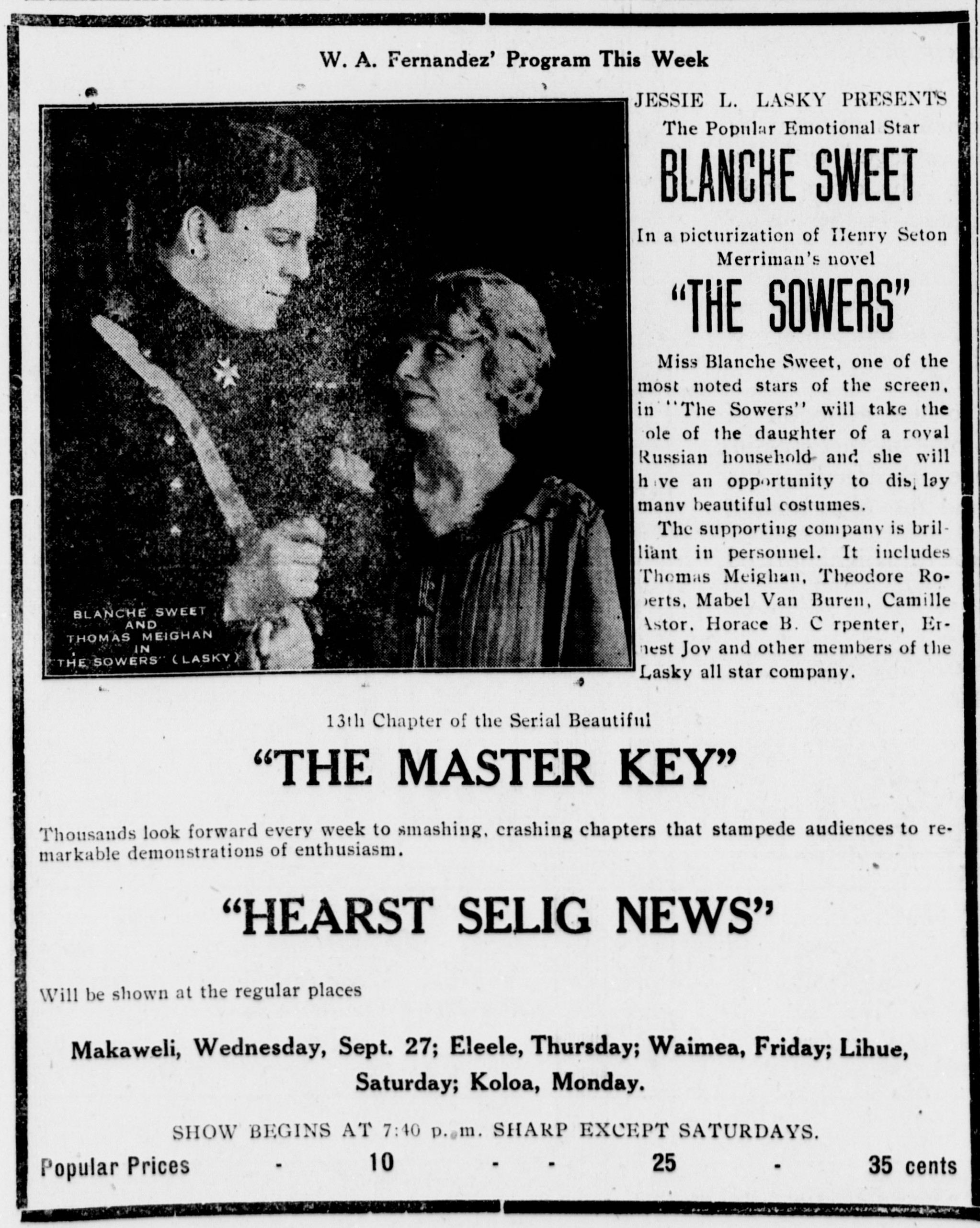
- Newspaper advertisement
- Directed by: William C. deMille; M.A. Harris (ass't dir.); Camille Astor (ass't dir.)
- Written by: Henry Seton Merriman (novel:The Sowers); Marion Fairfax (scenario)
- Produced by: Jesse Lasky
- Starring: Blanche Sweet; Thomas Meighan
- Cinematography: Charles Rosher
- Distributed by: Paramount Pictures
- Release date: March 30, 1916
- Running time: 50 minutes; 5 reels
- Country: United States
- Language: Silent film (English intertitles)

The Sowers is a surviving 1916 silent film drama produced by Jesse Lasky, released through Paramount Pictures and directed by William C. deMille. The feature stars Blanche Sweet and Thomas Meighan and is based on the 1896 novel The Sowers by Henry Seton Merriman. It is preserved in the Library of Congress collections.

== Cast ==
- Blanche Sweet - Karin Dolokhof
- Thomas Meighan - Prince Paul Alexis
- Mabel Van Buren - Princess Tanya
- Ernest Joy - Count Egor Strannik
- Theodore Roberts - Boris Dolokhof
- Horace B. Carpenter - Chief of Secret Police
- Raymond Hatton - The Peddler
- Harold Howard - The Tramp

== See also ==
- Blanche Sweet filmography
