= The Alaskan =

1924 film by Herbert Brenon

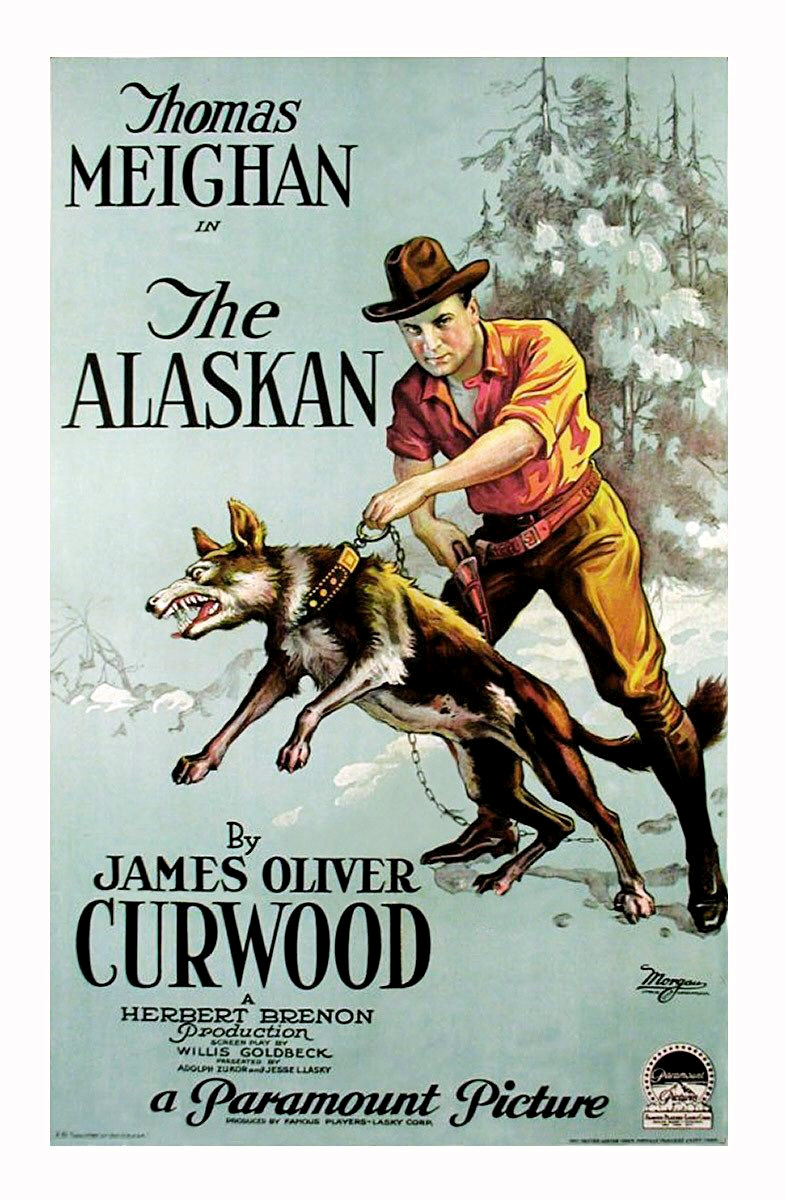
- Theatrical poster
- Directed by: Herbert Brenon
- Written by: Willis Goldbeck (scenario); Harry H. Caldwell (intertitles)
- Based on: The Alaskan by James Oliver Curwood
- Produced by: Adolph Zukor; Jesse Lasky
- Starring: Thomas Meighan; Estelle Taylor; Anna May Wong
- Cinematography: James Wong Howe
- Production company: Famous Players–Lasky
- Distributed by: Paramount Pictures
- Release dates: September 14, 1924 (NY; premiere); September 22, 1924 (nationwide; USA)
- Running time: 7 reels; 6,736 feet
- Country: United States
- Language: Silent (English intertitles)

The Alaskan is a 1924 American silent adventure drama film based on a novel by James Oliver Curwood set in northwoods country, as his novels tend to be, in this case Alaska. The film was produced and released by Paramount Pictures and directed by Herbert Brenon. The picture stars Thomas Meighan, Estelle Taylor and an early role by Anna May Wong.

== Cast ==
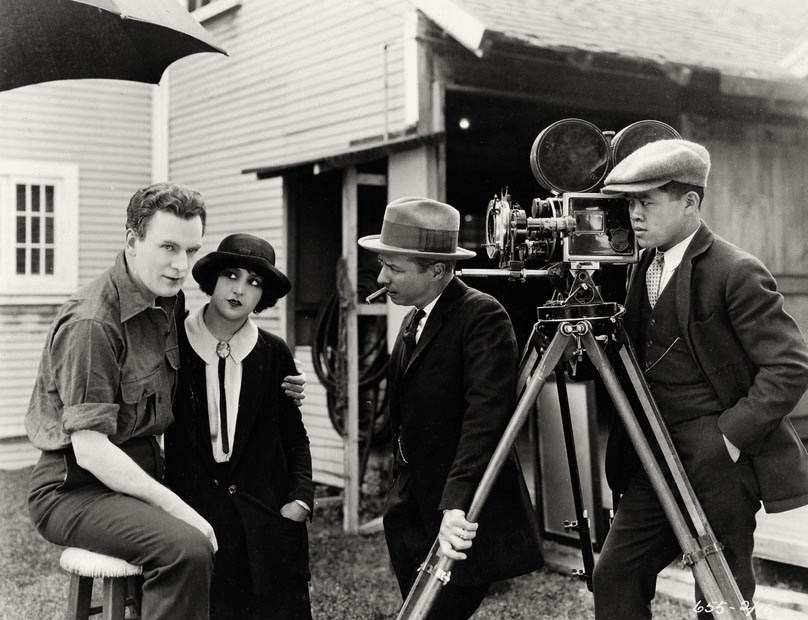
Production still. Left to right: Thomas Meighan, Estelle Taylor, Herbert Brenon, James Wong Howe

- Thomas Meighan as Alan Holt
- Estelle Taylor as Mary Standish
- John Sainpolis as Rossland
- Frank Campeau as Stampede Smith
- Anna May Wong as Keok
- Alphonse Ethier as John Graham
- Maurice de Canonge as Tautuk (as Maurice Cannon)
- Charles Ogle as Lawyer

== Preservation ==
With no prints of The Alaskan located in any film archives, it is a lost film.

== See also ==
- List of lost films
