= Alias the Night Wind =

1923 film

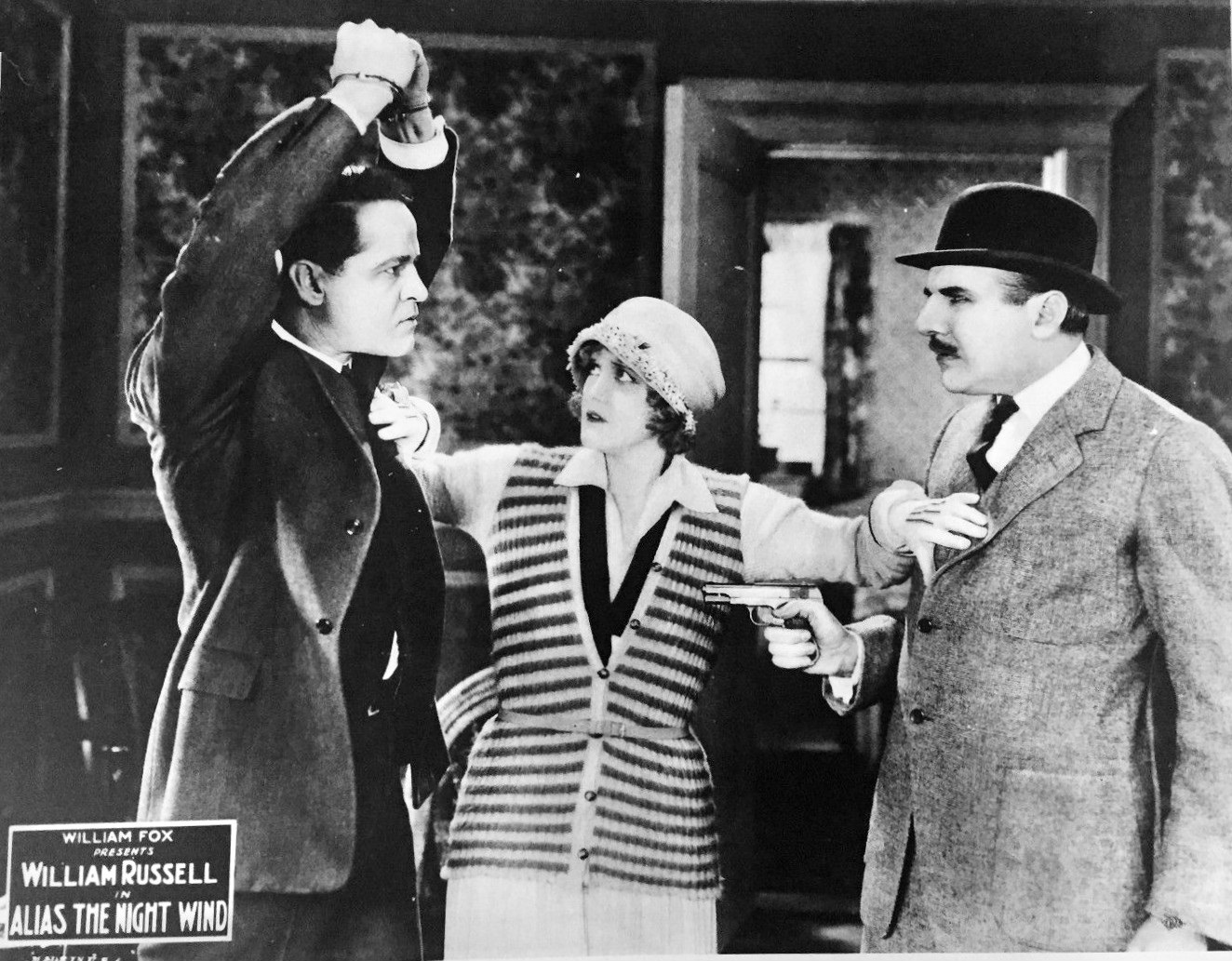
- Alias the Night Wind lobby card
- Directed by: Joseph Franz
- Written by: Robert N. Lee
- Based on: Alias the Night Wind by Frederic Van Rensselaer Dey
- Produced by: William Fox
- Starring: William Russell; Maude Wayne; Charles K. French
- Cinematography: Ernest Miller
- Production company: Fox Film
- Distributed by: Fox Film
- Release date: August 19, 1923
- Country: United States
- Languages: Silent; English intertitles

Alias the Night Wind is a lost 1923 American silent mystery film directed by Joseph Franz and starring William Russell, Maude Wayne and Charles K. French.

== Cast ==
- William Russell as Bing Howard
- Maude Wayne as Katherine Maxwell
- Charles K. French as Amos Chester
- Wade Boteler as Thomas Clancy
- Donald MacDonald as Clifford Rushton
- Milton Ross as R.J. Brown
- Charles Wellesley as Police Commissioner
- Mark Fenton as The Nurse
- Otto Matieson as Detective
- Robert Klein as Detective
- Bert Lindley as Detective
- Jack Miller as Stuart Clancy

== Preservation ==
With no holdings located in archives, Alias the Night Wind is considered a lost film.

== Bibliography ==
- Solomon, Aubrey. The Fox Film Corporation, 1915-1935: A History and Filmography. McFarland, 2011.
