= When Husbands Flirt =

1925 film

- Directed by: William A. Wellman
- Written by: Dorothy Arzner; Paul Gangelin
- Produced by: Harry Cohn
- Starring: Dorothy Revier
- Cinematography: Sam Landers
- Distributed by: Columbia Pictures
- Release date: November 1, 1925
- Running time: 6 reels
- Country: United States
- Language: Silent (English intertitles)

When Husbands Flirt is a 1925 American silent comedy film directed by William A. Wellman released by Columbia Pictures. It stars Dorothy Revier.

== Plot ==
As described in a film magazine review, Violet Gilbert, a young wife, accuses her husband Henry of unfaithfulness when, after he has stayed late at his office, she finds in his car a card case belonging to a woman whom she does not know. The husband is hounded for a considerable time, and then the wife learns that her husband's partner Wilbur had borrowed his car on the night the trouble started, and that the card case belongs to the gay elder man's escort, the blonde vamp Charlotte.

== Cast ==
- Dorothy Revier as Violet Gilbert
- Forrest Stanley as Henry Gilbert
- Tom Ricketts as Wilbur Belcher
- Ethel Wales as Mrs. Wilbur Belcher
- Maude Wayne as Charlotte Germaine
- Frank Weed as Percy Snodgrass
- Erwin Connelly as Joe McCormick

== Preservation status ==
A print of When Husbands Flirt is preserved at Cinemateket Svenska Filminstitutet, Stockholm.
