= The Easy Road =

1921 film

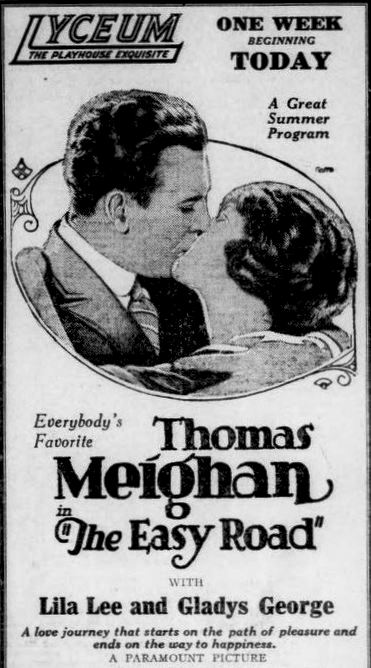
- Newspaper ad
- Directed by: Tom Forman
- Screenplay by: Beulah Marie Dix
- Based on: "Easy Street" by Blair Hall
- Produced by: Jesse L. Lasky
- Starring: Thomas Meighan; Gladys George; Grace Goodall; Arthur Edmund Carewe; Lila Lee; Laura Anson; Viora Daniel
- Cinematography: Harry Perry
- Production company: Famous Players–Lasky Corporation
- Distributed by: Paramount Pictures
- Release date: February 13, 1921
- Running time: 50 minutes
- Country: United States
- Languages: Silent; English intertitles

The Easy Road is a 1921 American silent drama film directed by Tom Forman and written by Beulah Marie Dix. The film is based upon a story by Blair Hall. The Easy Road stars Thomas Meighan, Gladys George, Grace Goodall, Arthur Edmund Carewe, Lila Lee, Laura Anson, and Viora Daniel. The film was released on February 13, 1921, by Paramount Pictures.

== Plot ==
Sailor and novelist Leonard Fayne marries wealthy Isabel Grace, whose riches hamper his creative faculties. On the suggestion of sculptress Katherine Dare, Isabel travels to Europe, leaving her husband permission to use her bank account. Leonard steadily declines in her absence and is on the verge of suicide when he meets Ella Klotz, a waif who is about to kill herself because she is going blind. He takes Ella to his studio to care for her, and believing he owes his life to the girl, Leonard once again begins to write. Meanwhile, Isabel is being pursued by an old suitor named Heminway, but realizes that she still loves her husband and returns from Europe. Heminway tries unsuccessfully to keep the couple apart.

== Cast ==
- Thomas Meighan as Leonard Fayne
- Gladys George as Isabel Grace
- Grace Goodall as Katherine Dare
- Arthur Edmund Carewe as Heminway
- Lila Lee as Ella Klotz
- Laura Anson as Minnie Baldwin
- Viora Daniel as Laura

== Production ==
Filming began in September 1920, at the Lasky studio under the title Easy Street.

== Preservation status ==
The film is presumed lost.
