= The Call of the Canyon (film) =

1923 film

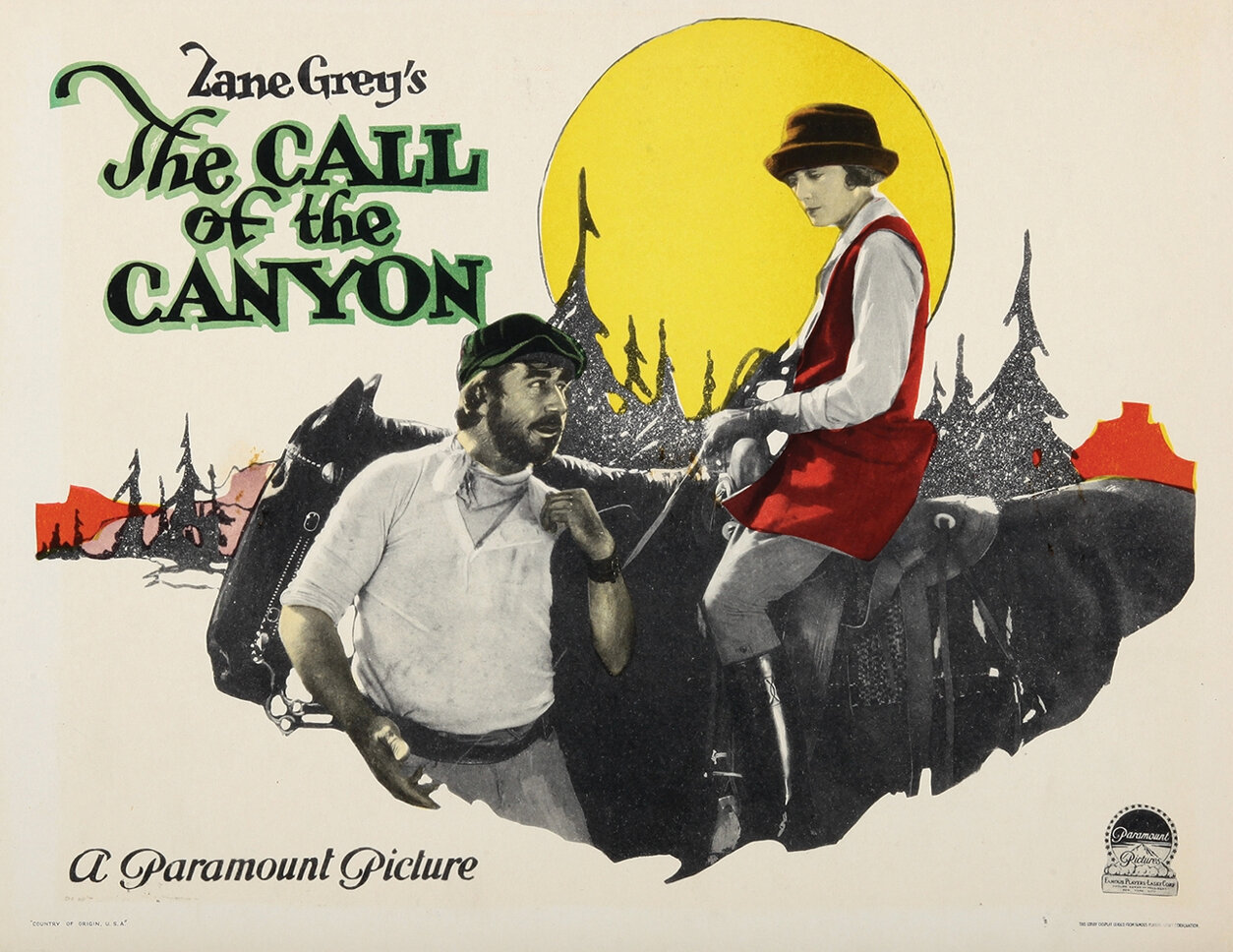
- Lobby card
- Directed by: Victor Fleming
- Screenplay by: Edfrid A. Bingham; Doris Schroeder
- Based on: The Call of the Canyon by Zane Grey
- Produced by: Jesse Lasky
- Starring: Richard Dix; Lois Wilson; Marjorie Daw
- Cinematography: James Wong Howe
- Production company: Famous Players–Lasky
- Distributed by: Paramount Pictures
- Release date: December 16, 1923 (USA)
- Running time: 70 minutes 7 reels, 6,993 ft
- Country: United States
- Language: Silent (English intertitles)

The Call of the Canyon is a 1923 American silent Western film directed by Victor Fleming and starring Richard Dix, Lois Wilson, and Marjorie Daw. Based on the novel The Call of the Canyon by Zane Grey, the film is about a returning war veteran who is nursed back to health by a compassionate Arizona girl. The Call of the Canyon was filmed in Red Rock Crossing in Sedona, Arizona.

== Plot ==
Glenn Kilbourne returns from the war and travels to Arizona to regain his health. There he is nursed back to health by an Arizona girl, Flo Hutter. Kilbourne's fiancée, Carley Burch, arrives in Arizona but soon becomes disillusioned with life in the West and returns to New York. Sometime later, Flo is seriously injured in an accident. Wanting to repay her for restoring him back to health, Glenn asks her to marry him. On their wedding day, Carley returns to Arizona from New York looking for Glenn. When Flo sees that Glenn and Carley are still in love, she calls off her wedding to Glenn and marries another admirer, Lee Stanton.

== Cast ==
- Richard Dix as Glenn Kilbourne
- Lois Wilson as Carley Burch
- Marjorie Daw as Flo Hunter
- Noah Beery, Sr. as Haze Ruff
- Ricardo Cortez as Larry Morrison
- Fred Huntley as Tom Hutter
- Lillian Leighton as Mrs. Hutter
- Helen Dunbar as Aunt Mary
- Tom London as Lee Stanton
- Eddie Clayton as Tenney Jones
- Dorothy Seastrom as Eleanor Harmon
- Laura Anson as Beatrice Lovell
- Charles Richards as Roger Newton
- Ralph Yearsley as Charlie Oatmeal
- Arthur Rankin as Virgil Rust
- Mervyn LeRoy as Jack Rawlins

== Preservation status ==
Once thought to be a lost film, The Call of the Canyon was one of ten silent films digitally preserved in Russia's film archive Gosfilmofond and provided to the Library of Congress in October 2010.

== See also ==
- List of rediscovered films
