= Maude Wayne =

American actress (1890–1983)

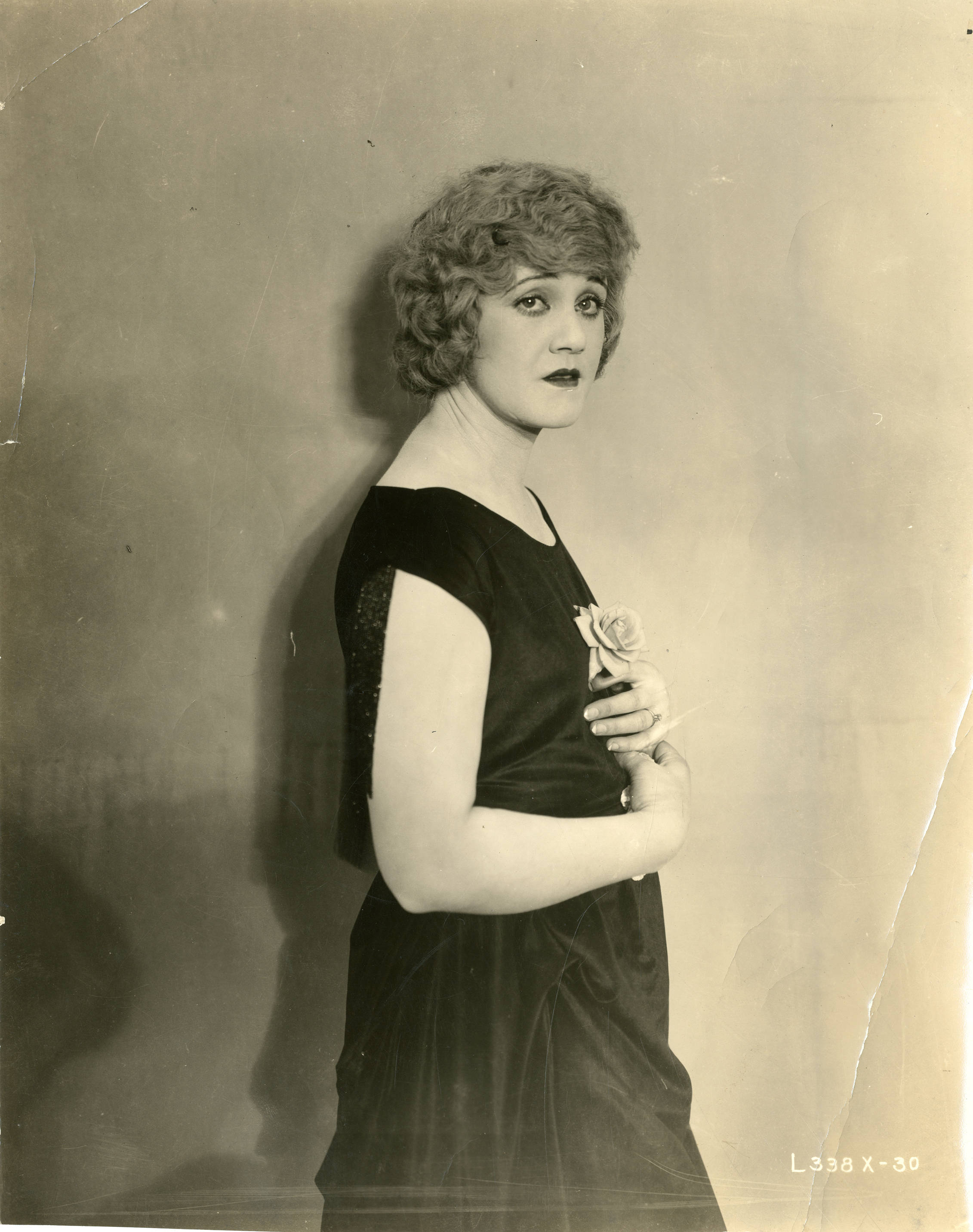
- Born: Maude Lois Wehn; March 26, 1890; Beatrice, Nebraska, US
- Died: October 10, 1983 (aged 93); Los Angeles, California, US
- Occupation: Actress
- Spouse: Johnnie Walker
- Relatives: Richard Wayne

Maude Wayne (born Maude Wehn, March 26, 1890-October 10, 1983) was an American film actress who was active in Hollywood during the silent film era.

== Biography ==
Maude was born in Beatrice, Nebraska, to Louis Wehn and Maria McCathern. She was the youngest of the couple's children, and her brother Richard Wayne also became an actor.

After starting as an extra in Triangle Film productions, she began appearing in Keystone Studios films around 1917, often as one of Mack Sennett's bathing beauties. Following a few years spent in comedies, she later transitioned to heavier, vampier, more dramatic roles at Paramount Pictures, sometimes playing the leading lady to Rudolph Valentino.

She retired from acting in the late 1920s before she married fellow actor Johnnie Walker.

== Partial filmography ==
- The Fighting Shepherdess (1920)
- The Fighting Chance (1920)
- Behold My Wife! (1920)
- Risky Business (1920)
- The Lure of Egypt (1921)
- The Mysterious Rider (1921)
- The Gray Dawn (1922)
- Moran of the Lady Letty (1922)
- The Bachelor Daddy (1922)
- Shirley of the Circus (1922)
- The Young Rajah (1922)
- Prodigal Daughters (1923)
- The Song of Love (1923)
- The Silent Partner (1923)
- Alias the Night Wind (1923)
- Hollywood (1923)
- Her Accidental Husband (1923)
- His Forgotten Wife (1924)
- Leap Year (1924)
- When Husbands Flirt (1925)
- Fashions for Women (1927)
- Held by the Law (1927)
