= The Abyss of Wonders =

1953 novel by Perley Poore Sheehan

- Dust-jacket from the first edition
- Author: Perley Poore Sheehan
- Cover artist: John T. Brooks
- Language: English
- Genre: Science fiction
- Publisher: Polaris Press
- Publication date: 1953
- Publication place: United States
- Media type: Print (hardback)
- Pages: 191
- OCLC: 6510284

The Abyss of Wonders is a science fiction novel by American writer Perley Poore Sheehan. It was first published in book form in 1953 by Polaris Press in an edition of 990 copies (though the actual book says 1500). It was the second and final book published by Polaris Press and included an introduction by P. Schuyler Miller. The novel originally appeared in the magazine Argosy in 1915.

== Plot introduction ==
The novel concerns a group of people from the US, a young boy along with a Chinese man and an old Russian, who make a spiritual quest to a city of lost race in the Gobi Desert that is technologically advanced through a combination of theosophy and superscience.

== Reception ==
Groff Conklin, reviewing the 1953 edition, called it "a fairy tale for youngsters ... written in a kindergarten style that is irritating to most modern readers." Miller recommended the novel to collectors, but noted that "casual readers will probably be disappointed".

Everett F. Bleiler dismissed the novel as "a curiosity only", describing it as "curiously imprecise and wavery, with a fairytale atmosphere; weakly planned, with many unsatisfactory elements".

== Sources ==
- Chalker, Jack L.; Owings, Mark (1998). The Science-Fantasy Publishers: A Bibliographic History, 1923-1998. Westminster, MD and Baltimore: Mirage Press, Ltd. p. 524.
- Clute, John; Peter Nicholls (1995). The Encyclopedia of Science Fiction. New York: St. Martin's Griffin. p. 1098. ISBN 0-312-13486-X.
- Tuck, Donald H. (1978). The Encyclopedia of Science Fiction and Fantasy. Chicago: Advent. p. 386. ISBN 0-911682-22-8.
