= The Argyle Case (1917 film) =

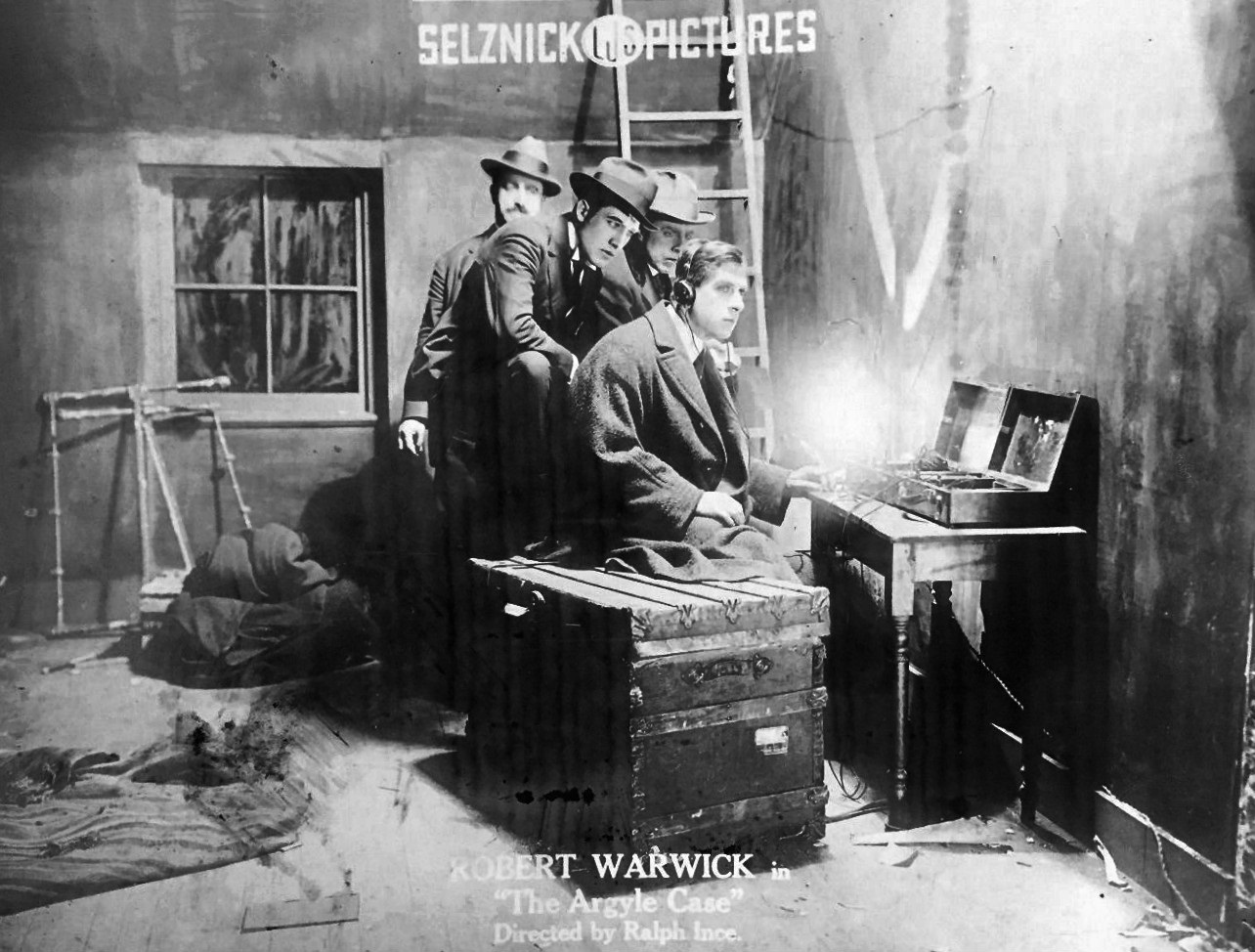
- Lobby card
- Directed by: Ralph Ince
- Written by: Frederic Chapin; Ralph Ince
- Based on: The Argyle Case by Harriet Ford and Harvey J. O'Higgins
- Produced by: Robert Warwick
- Starring: Robert Warwick
- Cinematography: André Barlatier
- Distributed by: Selznick Pictures
- Release date: February 1917
- Running time: 7 reels
- Country: United States
- Language: Silent (English intertitles)

The Argyle Case is a 1917 American silent mystery film produced by and starring Robert Warwick and directed by Ralph Ince. It was distributed by Lewis J. Selznick through his Selznick Pictures Corporation.

The play was refilmed in 1929 as an early talkie The Argyle Case with Thomas Meighan and Lila Lee.

A copy survives in the archives of the British Film Institute.

== Cast ==
- Robert Warwick as Asche Kayton
- Charles Hines as Joe Manning
- Frank McGlynn as John Argyle
- Arthur Albertson as Bruce Argyle
- Gazelle Marche as Nan Thornton
- Elaine Hammerstein as Mary Mazuret
- John Fleming as Inspector Dougherty
- H. Cooper Cliffe as Frederick Kreisler
- Mary Alden as Nellie Marsh
- Robert Vivian as Finley
- Frank Evans as Mr. Hurley
