= The Silent Partner (1923 film) =

1923 film by Charles Maigne

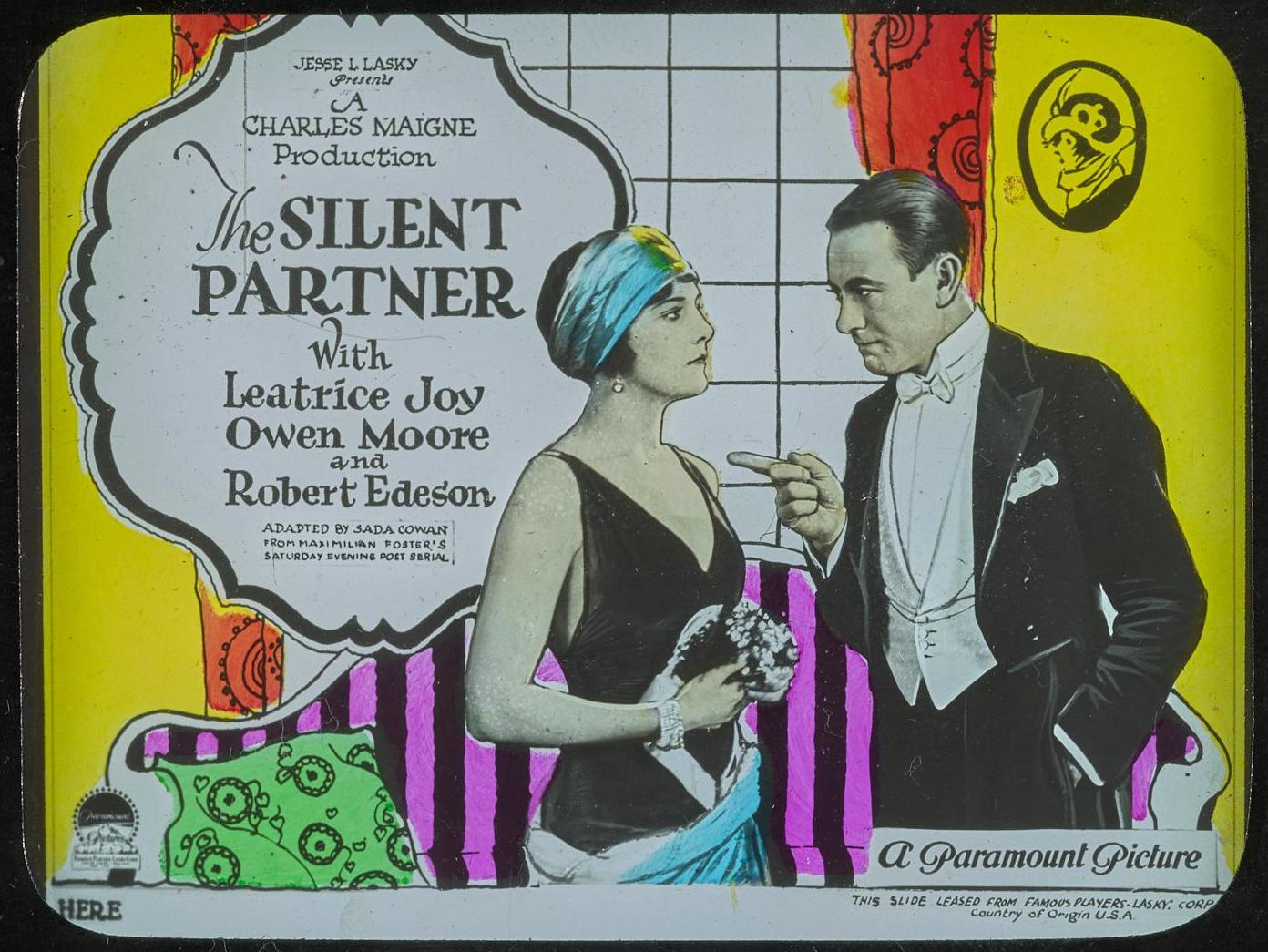
- Lantern slide
- Directed by: Charles Maigne
- Written by: Sada Cowan (scenario)
- Based on: Saturday Evening Post articles by Maximilian Foster
- Starring: Leatrice Joy
- Cinematography: Walter L. Griffin
- Distributed by: Paramount Pictures
- Release date: September 16, 1923 (United States)
- Running time: 60 minutes
- Country: United States
- Language: Silent (English intertitles)

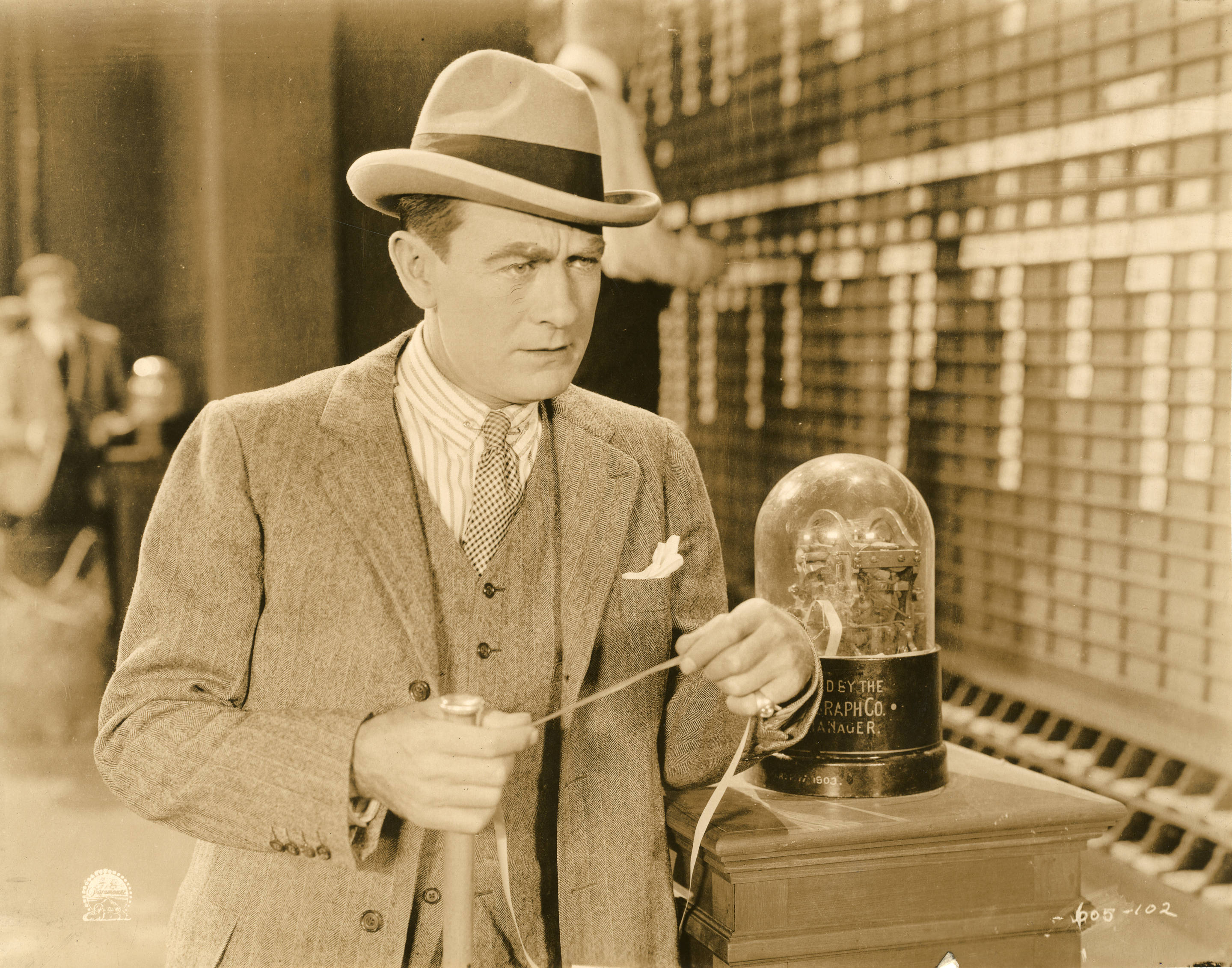
Scene with Owen Moore

The Silent Partner is a 1923 American silent drama film produced by Famous Players–Lasky and released through Paramount Pictures. It was based on a series of articles from the Saturday Evening Post by Maximilian Foster and directed by Charles Maigne. Leatrice Joy and Owen Moore star in the feature. The film is a remake of the 1917 film of the same name.

== Plot ==
As described in a film magazine review, Lisa Coburn is a young wife who has seen the folly of living on all that her husband earns when he is on Wall Street. She determines, unknown to her husband George, to prepare against any coming disaster. The husband's employee is infatuated with the young wife and plans to ruin the husband and obtain her. His plans succeed, but he fails to win the wife. Instead, she goes to the husband, who has left her in anger and haste, and wins him back by convincing him of the truth of her story.

== Cast ==
- Leatrice Joy as Lisa Coburn
- Owen Moore as George Coburn
- Robert Edeson as Ralph Coombes
- Robert Schable as Harvey Dredge
- Patterson Dial as Cora Dredge
- E. H. Calvert as Jim Harker
- Maude Wayne as Gertie Page
- Bess Flowers as Mrs. Nesbit
- Laura Anson as Mrs. Harker
- Bert Woodruff as Owens
- R. Henry Grey as Charles Nesbit

== Preservation ==
With no prints of The Silent Partner located in any film archives, it is a lost film.
