= If You Believe It, It's So =

1922 film by Tom Forman

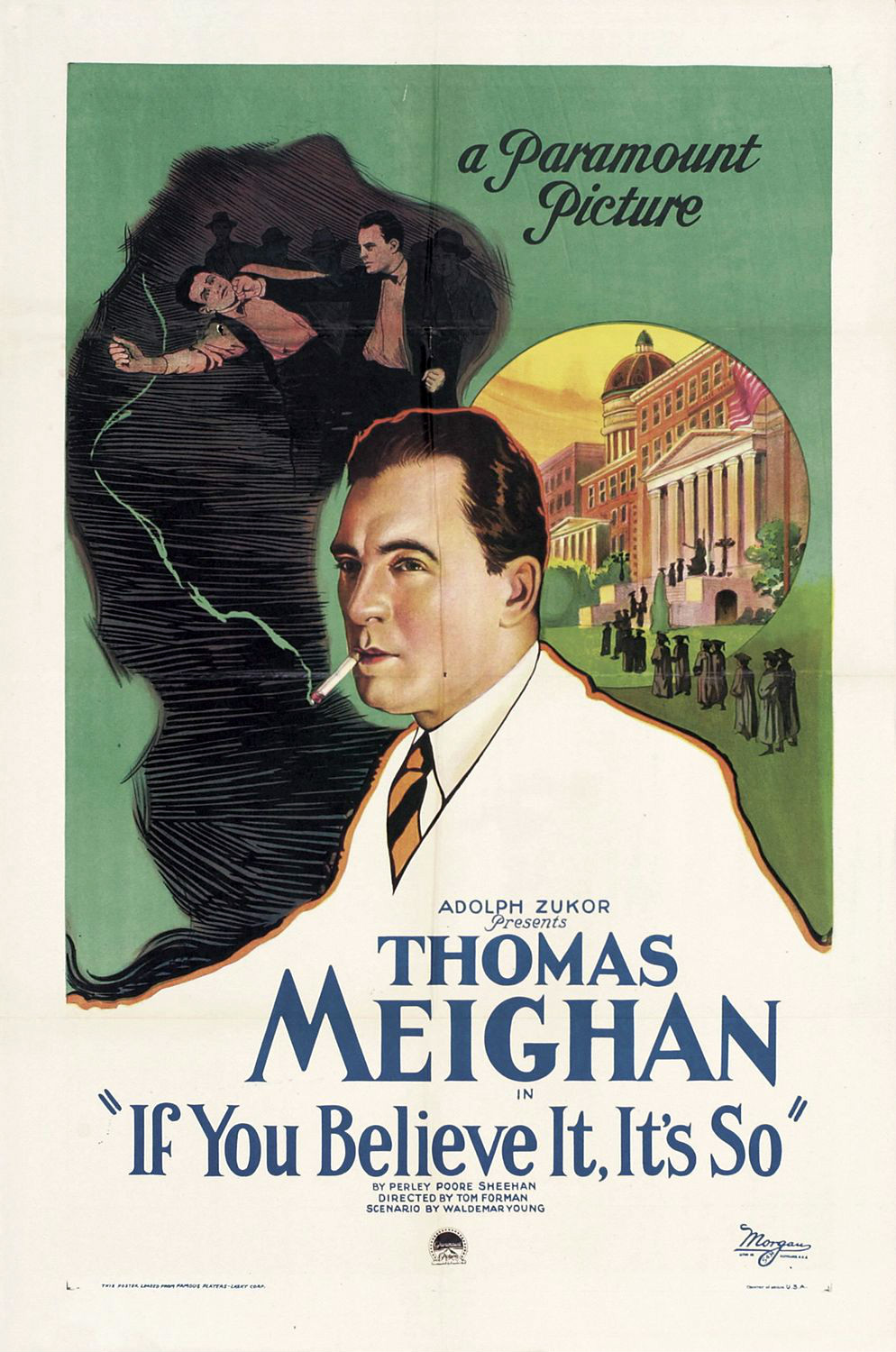
- Film poster
- Directed by: Tom Forman
- Screenplay by: Perley Poore Sheehan; Waldemar Young
- Produced by: Adolph Zukor
- Starring: Thomas Meighan; Pauline Starke; Joseph J. Dowling; Theodore Roberts; Charles Stanton Ogle; Laura Anson
- Cinematography: Harry Perry
- Production company: Famous Players–Lasky Corporation
- Distributed by: Paramount Pictures
- Release date: July 2, 1922
- Running time: 70 minutes
- Country: United States
- Language: Silent (English intertitles)

If You Believe It, It's So is a lost 1922 American silent drama film directed by Tom Forman and written by Perley Poore Sheehan and Waldemar Young. The film stars Thomas Meighan, Pauline Starke, Joseph J. Dowling, Theodore Roberts, Charles Stanton Ogle, and Laura Anson. The film was released on July 2, 1922, by Paramount Pictures.

== Cast ==
- Thomas Meighan as Chick Harris
- Pauline Starke as Alvah Morley
- Joseph J. Dowling as Ezra Wood
- Theodore Roberts as Sky Blue
- Charles Stanton Ogle as Colonel Williams
- Laura Anson as Tessie Wyngate
- Charles K. French as Frank Tine
- Tom Kennedy as Bartender
- Ed Brady as Constable
