= Frederick Van Rensselaer Dey =

American writer

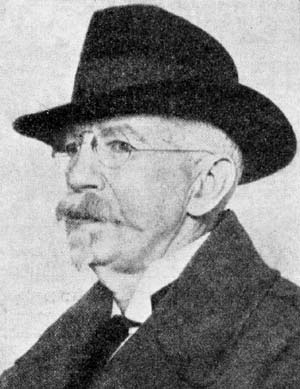
- Born: February 10, 1861; Watkins Glen, New York
- Died: April 25, 1922 (aged 61); New York City
- Alma mater: Columbia Law School
- Occupation: Writer
- Writing career
- Notable work: Nick Carter stories

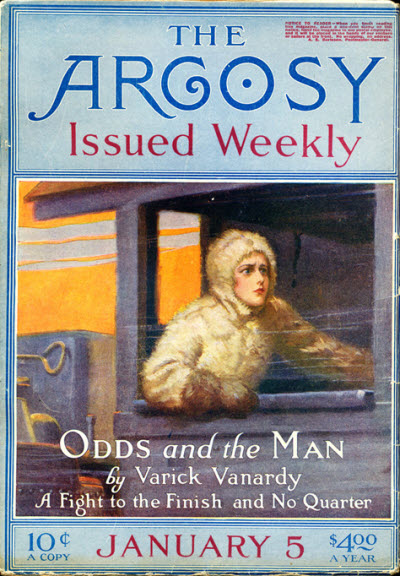
Written by "Varick Vanardy", Dey's novel Odds and the Man was serialized in The Argosy in 1918

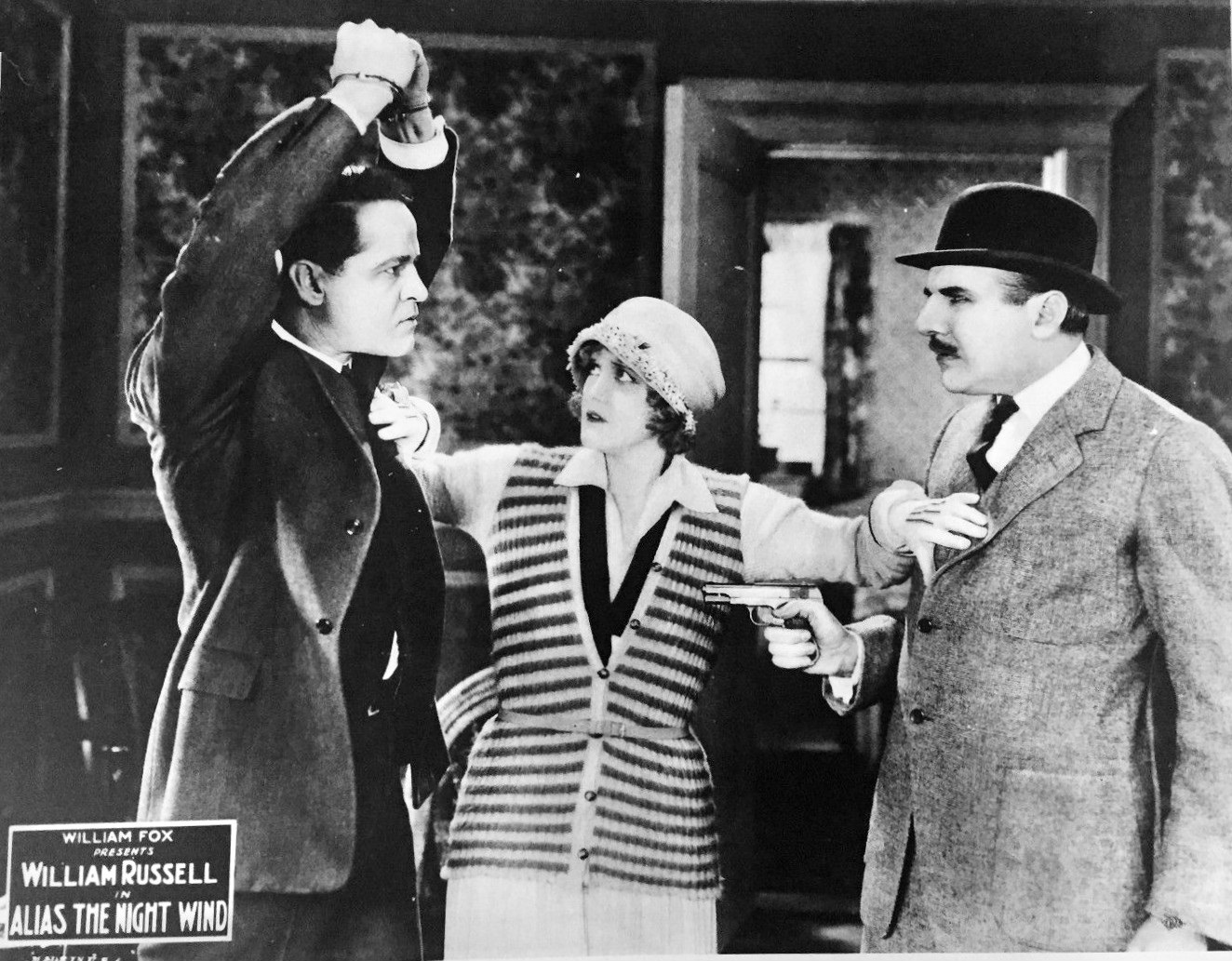
Lobby card for Alias the Night Wind (1923), based on Dey's 1913 novel serialized in Cavalier

Frederick van Rensselaer Dey (February 10, 1861 – April 25, 1922) was an American dime novelist and pulp fiction writer.

== Early life ==
He was born on February 10, 1861, in Watkins Glen, New York, to David Peter Dey and Emma Brewster Sayre. He attended the Havana Academy, and later graduated from the Columbia Law School. He practiced law and was a junior partner of William J. Gaynor. Dey took up writing while recovering from an illness. His first full-length story was written for Beadle and Adams in 1881.

== Marriages ==
Dey married Annie Shepard Wheeler, of Providence, Rhode Island, on June 4, 1885, and they had two children, Harriet and Kinsley. After a divorce he married Haryot Holt (c. 1857–June 16, 1950) on April 1, 1898.

== Career ==
In 1891, Street & Smith hired him to continue the series begun by John R. Coryell, on the adventures of Nick Carter. Most of his Nick Carter stories appeared under the pseudonyms "A Celebrated Author" and "The Author of 'Nick Carter'". He wrote over a thousand Nick Carter novelettes, comprising over forty million words, all written longhand. Dey also worked as a newspaper reporter.

Writing as "Varick Vanardy", he created "The Night Wind", which appeared in stories from 1913 to the early 1920s. Collected into 4 books, these have been recently reprinted by Wildside Press: Alias The Night Wind (1913), Return of the Night Wind, The Night Wind's Promise, The Lady of the Night Wind (1918). A film adaptation of the first book, Alias the Night Wind, was made in 1923.

== Death ==
Dey shot himself in his room in the Hotel Broztell in New York City, during the night of April 25, 1922, or the morning of April 26, 1922. The body was found either by Charles E. MacLean, the managing editor for Street & Smith, or by Deputy Police Commissioner Joseph Faurot.
