= Evelyn Beatrice Hall =

English biographical writer (1868–1956)

- Born: 28 September 1868; Shooter's Hill, Kent, England
- Died: 13 April 1956 (aged 87); Wadhurst, East Sussex, England
- Occupation: Writer
- Writing career
- Pen name: Stephen G. Tallentyre

Evelyn Beatrice Hall (28 September 1868 – 13 April 1956), (Note: Sources which date Hall's death to 1919, such as Fred R. Shapiro's The Yale Book of Quotations, are in error. The confusion may have arisen because Hall published no further written work after 1919.) who wrote under the pseudonym S[tephen] G. Tallentyre, was an English writer best known for her biography of Voltaire entitled The Life of Voltaire, first published in 1903. She also wrote The Friends of Voltaire, which she completed in 1906.

In The Friends of Voltaire, Hall wrote: "I disapprove of what you say, but I will defend to the death your right to say it" as an illustration of Voltaire's beliefs. This quotation – which is sometimes misattributed to Voltaire himself – is often cited to describe the principle of freedom of speech.

== Personal life ==
Hall was born on 28 September 1868 in Shooter's Hill, Kent, the second of the four children of the Reverend William John Hall (1830–1910), Minor Canon of St Paul's Cathedral, and Isabella Frances Hall (née Cooper). Her elder sister, Ethel Frances Hall (1865–1943), married the writer Hugh Stowell Scott (pseudonym Henry Seton Merriman) in 1889. Evelyn Hall was to become an important influence in the life of her brother-in-law, with whom she co-authored two volumes of short stories, From Wisdom Court (1893) and The Money-Spinner (1896). Upon his death in 1903, Scott left £5,000 to Hall, writing that it was "in token of my gratitude for her continued assistance and literary advice, without which I should never have been able to have made a living by my pen".

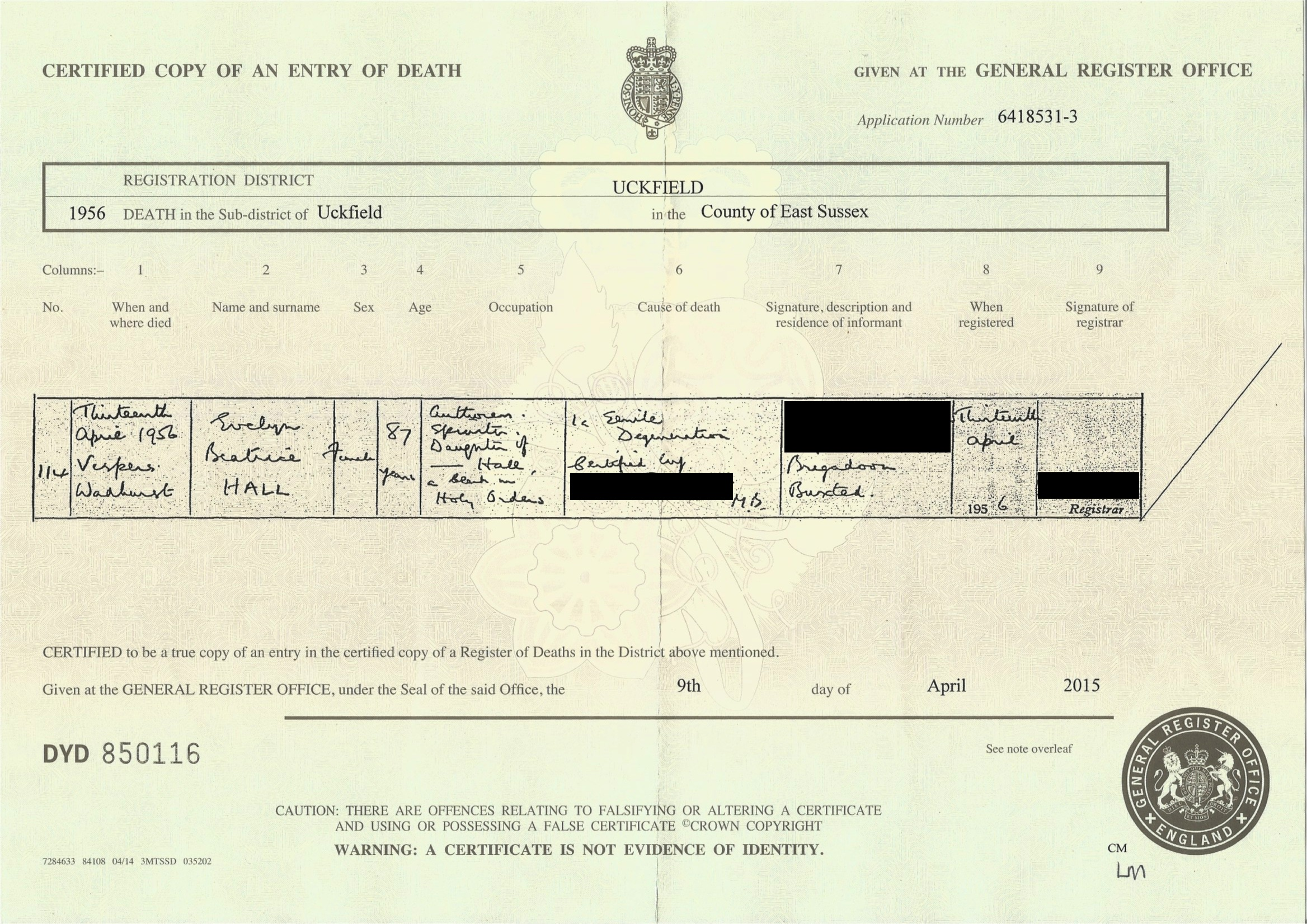
Hall's death certificate

Hall never married, and died in Wadhurst, East Sussex, on 13 April 1956, aged 87.

== Bibliography ==
All publications appeared under the name S. G. Tallentyre.

- From Wisdom Court (with Henry Seton Merriman). Heinemann, London 1893 (reprinted 1896).
- The Money-Spinner and Other Character Notes (with Henry Seton Merriman). Smith, Elder & Co., London 1896 (reprinted 1897).
- The Women of the Salons, and Other French Portraits. Longmans, London 1901.
- The Life of Voltaire. Smith, Elder & Co., London 1903. OCLC 609483264. Vols. 1 & 2 at Google Books.
- The Friends of Voltaire. Smith, Elder & Co., London 1906.
- The Life of Mirabeau. Smith, Elder & Co., London 1908 (US edition 1912).
- Early-Victorian, A Village Chronicle. Smith, Elder & Co., London 1910 (US title: Basset, A Village Chronicle)
- Matthew Hargraves. Smith, Elder and Co., London 1914.
- Voltaire in His Letters (translator). John Murray, London 1919.
- Love Laughs Last. W. Blackwood & Sons, Edinburgh / London 1919.
