= Helen Leslie =

American actress

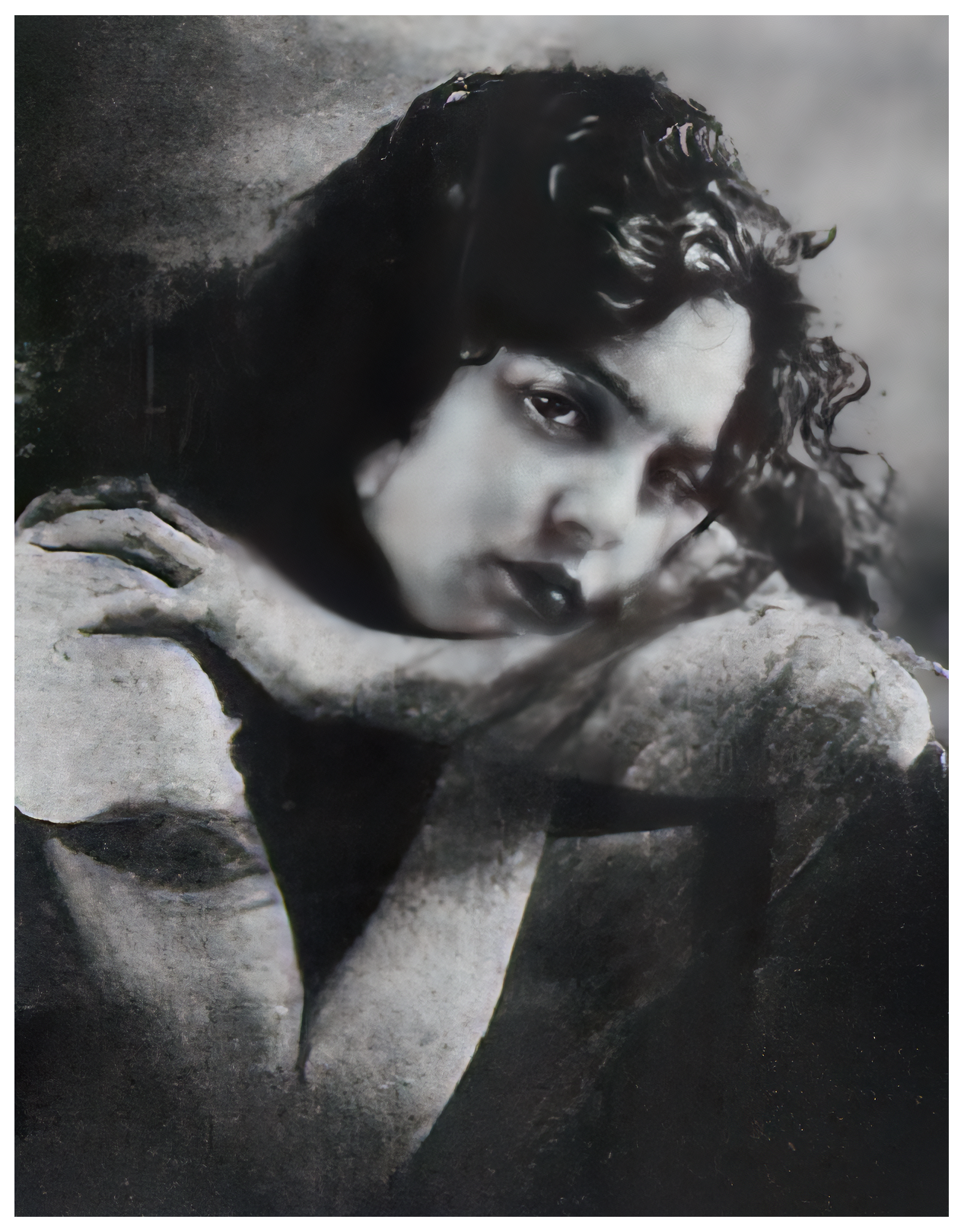
- Helen Leslie in 1916
- Born: Helen Gracia Riesing; 20 May 1897; Indianapolis, Indiana, US
- Other names: Helen Riesing; Gracia Jaccard; Helen Gracia Jaccard
- Occupation: Actress
- Spouse: Jacques Jaccard (m. 1915; div. 1924)

Helen Leslie (born Helen Riesing and sometimes known as Gracia Jaccard) was an American actress active in Hollywood during the silent era. She was briefly married to writer/director Jacques Jaccard.

== Biography ==
Helen was born on May 20, 1897, in Indianapolis, Indiana, to William Riesling and Frederika Childs.

She was 18 years old and continuing a career as an actress at Universal when she married writer/director Jacques Jaccard, 28 years old. After her marriage, she gave up acting and her promising career. The marriage was tumultuous and did not last. After her divorce, she dropped out of public life.

In 1930, she was running the La Granada Apartments in Los Angeles's Koreatown neighborhood.

== Selected filmography ==
- Stepping Out (1917)
- Society's Hypocrites (1916)
- The Gold Band (1916)
- Ashes of Remembrance (1916)
- If My Country Should Call (1916)
- From the Rogue's Gallery (1916)
- The Code of the Mounted (1916)
- A Thousand Dollars a Week (1916)
- The Sody Clerk (1916)
- Timothy Dobbs, That's Me (1916)
- Son o' the Stars (1916)
- A Life at Stake (1915)
- A Kentucky Idyll (1915)
- The Shriek in the Night (1915)
- The Weird Nemesis (1915)
- From the Shadows (1915)
- Fate's Alibi (1915)
- The Toll of Youth (1915)
- The Little Girl of the Attic (1915)
- The Prophet of the Hills (1915)
- Nature's Triumph (1915)
- When the Spider Tore Loose (1915)
- His Last Trick (1915)
- The Bay of Seven Isles (1915)
- To Redeem an Oath (1915)
- Martin Lowe, Financier (1915)
- The Temptation of Edwin Swayne (1915)
- Pawns of Fate (1915)
- The Big Sister's Christmas (1914)
- The Widow's Last (1914)
- The Link That Binds (1914)
