= The Argyle Case (1929 film) =

1929 film by Howard Bretherton

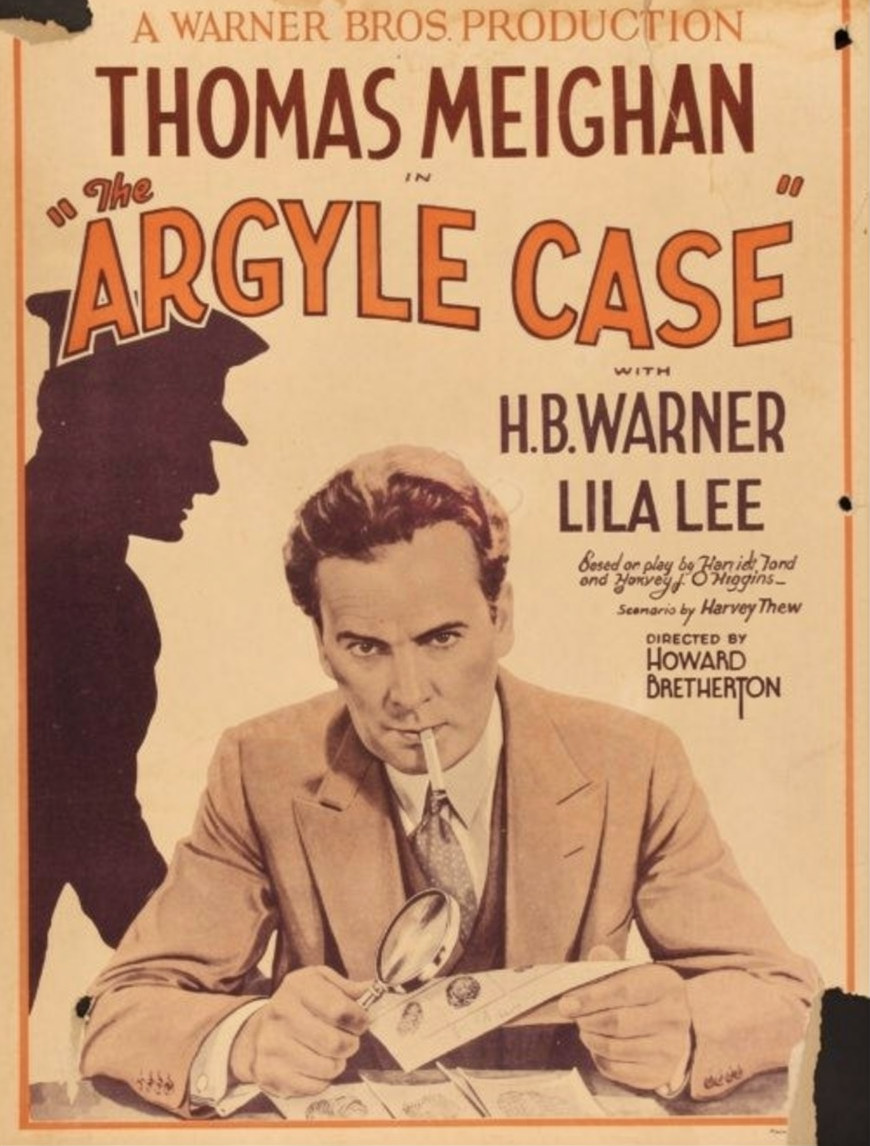
- Theatrical release poster
- Directed by: Howard Bretherton
- Written by: Harvey F. Thew; De Leon Anthony
- Based on: The Argyle Case: a Drama in Four Acts (1912 play); Harriet Ford; Harvey J. O'Higgins; William J. Burns
- Starring: Thomas Meighan; H.B. Warner; Lila Lee; John Darrow; ZaSu Pitts
- Cinematography: James Van Trees
- Edited by: Thomas Pratt
- Production company: Warner Bros. Pictures
- Distributed by: Warner Bros. Pictures
- Release date: August 17, 1929 (US)
- Running time: 85 minutes
- Country: United States
- Language: English

The Argyle Case is a 1929 American all-talking pre-Code mystery film directed by Howard Bretherton and starring Thomas Meighan, H.B. Warner, Lila Lee, John Darrow and ZaSu Pitts. The film was based on a play by Harriet Ford and Harvey J. O'Higgins. It was produced and released by Warner Bros. Pictures.

The play was previously filmed as a silent in 1917, The Argyle Case.

== Plot ==
John Argyle, capitalist, stands in the library of his home at midnight and savagely denounces someone who cannot be seen, declaring that he will immediately take steps to put his enemy in the hands of the police. As he reaches for the phone, he is struck down and falls to the floor, murdered, his attacker gone.

Kitty, the maid; Finley, the butler; Mary Morgan, the adopted daughter; and Mrs. Wyatt, her companion, all rush into the room to find Argyle dead. Bruce Argyle, estranged from his father for months but who had been at the latter's home the evening of the murder, arrives the next morning. He is soon followed by Alexander Kayton, a clever detective whom Bruce engages to investigate the elder Argyle's death.

Not only Bruce but also the servants are impelled to suspect Mary of the crime, since Bruce's quarrel with his father had induced the elder Argyle to restore Bruce's inheritance, thereby taking the fortune away from Mary. All, however, wish to protect her.

On the arrival of the detective, accompanied by Joe and Sam, his assistants, all members of the household are detected in deceptive acts and statements. Kayton's suspicion of Mary increases when she refuses to have her fingerprints taken, though he obtains them later by a ruse.

Mary, in turn, suspects Bruce may be guilty, and both she and Bruce endeavor to protect each other. They meet for a moment in the house, and Kayton overhears them making statements indicating guilty knowledge of the crime. Hurley, former attorney for Argyle and a permanent guest at his home, cooperates with Kayton in attempting to solve the mystery.

In his investigations, Kayton finds a counterfeit five hundred dollar bill in a drawer of the library table. He learns that Nellie Marsh (corrected from Hellie Marsh) was associated with Argyle's life 20 years before; was involved with the notorious Kreisler gang of counterfeiters; and was imprisoned. Though Kreisler has been thought dead for 20 years, treasury officials declare that the only man who could have produced so perfect a counterfeit is the same Kreisler.

Kayton suspects Hurley of complicity in the crime, though tangible evidence is lacking. Since Mrs. Marsh is allegedly mentioned in Argyle's will, Kayton advertises for her, and she appears at his office revealing herself now as Mrs. Martin, keeper of a boarding house.

Kayton warns Mrs. Martin that Mary is suspected publicly and plans to shield her from reporters. To aid his trap, Mary must appear to have run away, so Mrs. Martin takes Mary to her boarding house against Mary's wishes. Mary agrees to go believing this act will help protect Bruce.

While Mrs. Martin is out, Kayton's men install dictaphones in every room of the boarding house. Radio operatives Joe and Sam monitor the wires from an attic of the house next door, able to listen to everything said in the boarding house.

During the surveillance, Kayton overhears talk regarding Kreisler, and later hears Hurley, who has gone to the house and seems on friendly terms with its occupants.

Skidd, a member of the gang, grows suspicious of Mary and is about to eject her but is stopped by Kayton and his men. The detective reveals to Mrs. Martin that he knows her to be Mary's mother and the missing Nellie Marsh Morgan.

Hurley escapes from the house, unaware that Mary is the new roomer. With Hurley and Mrs. Martin face to face, Kayton plays one against the other, bringing out that they are married and that Hurley is, in fact, Kreisler himself. It is finally established that Hurley killed Argyle when threatened with exposure.

Hurley is arrested for murder, and the picture closes with Kayton and Mary in each other's arms.

== Cast ==
- Thomas Meighan as Alexander Kayton
- H. B. Warner as Hurley
- Lila Lee as Mary Morgan
- John Darrow as Bruce Argyle
- ZaSu Pitts as Mrs. Wyatt
- Bert Roach as Joe
- Wilbur Mack as Sam
- Douglas Gerrard as Finley
- Alona Marlowe as Kitty
- James Quinn as Skidd
- Gladys Brockwell as Mrs. Martin

== Preservation status ==
No film elements are known to survive. The soundtrack, which was recorded on Vitaphone disks, may survive in private hands. The sound to four reels (Reels 3, 5, 7, and 9), out of nine reels, survives on Vitaphone disks at the UCLA Film & Television Archive.

== See also ==
- List of early sound feature films (1926–1929)
