= The Friends of Voltaire =

1906 book by Evelyn Beatrice Hall

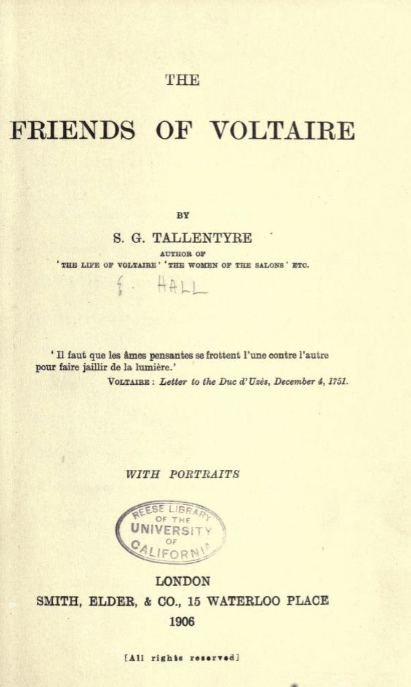
- Title page for The Friends of Voltaire (1906)
- Author: Evelyn Beatrice Hall
- Publication date: 1906
- ISBN: 978-1410210203

The Friends of Voltaire is an anecdotal biography of 18th-century French Enlightenment writer Voltaire written by English author Evelyn Beatrice Hall under the pseudonym S. G. Tallentyre. It was published in 1906. In 1907, it was published in Great Britain under the author's own name by G. P. Putnam's Sons. The classic work about Voltaire was still being printed nearly 100 years later in 2003.

== Overview ==
The book is in the form of an anecdotal biography telling the stories of ten men whose lives fell very closely together. The ten men were true contemporaries and aside from their friendship with Voltaire they were more or less closely associated with one another. Each of the ten is characterized by giving him an identifying label: d'Alembert the Thinker, Diderot the Talker, Galiani the Wit, Vauvenargues the Aphorist, d'Holbach the Host, Grimm the Journalist, Helvétius the Contradiction, Turgot the Statesman, Beaumarchais the Playwright, and Condorcet the Aristocrat.

The chapter on Helvétius contains a famous quotation that was subsequently misattributed to Voltaire himself. While discussing the persecution of Helvétius for his book "On the Mind" (which was publicly burned), Hall wrote:

What the book could never have done for itself, or for its author, persecution did for them both. 'On the Mind' became not the success of a season, but one of the most famous books of the century. The men who had hated it, and had not particularly loved Helvétius, flocked round him now. Voltaire forgave him all injuries, intentional or unintentional. 'What a fuss about an omelette!' he had exclaimed when he heard of the burning. How abominably unjust to persecute a man for such an airy trifle as that! 'I disapprove of what you say, but I will defend to the death your right to say it,' was his attitude now.

The phrase "I disapprove of what you say, but I will defend to the death your right to say it", which was originally intended as a summary (by Hall) of Voltaire's attitude, was widely misread as a literal quotation from Voltaire.
