= Thomas Meighan =

American actor (1879–1936)

- Meighan, sometime before 1923

Shepherd of The Lambs
- In office 1924–1926
- Preceded by: Albert Oldfield Brown
- Succeeded by: Thomas Alfred Wise

Personal details
- Born: April 9, 1879 Pittsburgh, Pennsylvania, U.S.
- Died: July 8, 1936 (aged 57) Great Neck, New York, U.S.
- Spouse: Frances Ring (1909–1936)
- Occupation: Actor

Thomas Meighan (April 9, 1879 – July 8, 1936) was an American actor of silent films and early talkies. He played several leading-man roles opposite popular actresses of the day, including Mary Pickford and Gloria Swanson. At one point he earned $10,000 per week.

== Early life ==
Meighan was born to John and Mary Meighan in Pittsburgh, Pennsylvania. His father was the president of Pittsburgh Facing Mills, and his family was well-off.

Meighan's parents encouraged him to go to college but he refused. At the age of 15, his father sent him to work shoveling coal, in an effort to instill a sense of discipline and a strong work ethic. After his experience with manual labor, he attended Mount St. Mary's College to study pharmacology. After three years of study, Meighan decided he wished to pursue acting. This decision ultimately resulted in a career in both theatre and the emerging film industry.

== Early theatre career ==
After dropping out of college in 1896, Meighan became a juvenile player in the Pittsburgh Stock Company headed by Henrietta Crosman. He was paid $35 per week. This early experience in theatre provided him with the skills and discipline that would benefit his later work.

Meighan first appeared on Broadway in 1900, and four years later appeared in The Two Orphans. His breakthrough role came in 1908 when he appeared with William Collier Sr. in The Dictator; this play was followed by a leading role in The College Widow, which had a successful run on Broadway in the 1907–1908 season. During this run, he met his wife Frances Ring.

Despite his film career, Meighan remained devoted to the theatre during his life.

== Film career ==
In 1914, he entered motion pictures, at that time still in their infancy. His first film, shot in London, was titled Dandy Donovan, the Gentleman Cracksman. This led to a contract with Famous Players–Lasky. His first U.S. film, in 1915, was The Fighting Hope. During the next two years, Meighan's career took off. In 1918, he made a propaganda film for World War I, titled Norma Talmadge and Thomas Meighan in a Liberty Loan Appeal. He then played opposite Mary Pickford in M'Liss.

=== Stardom ===
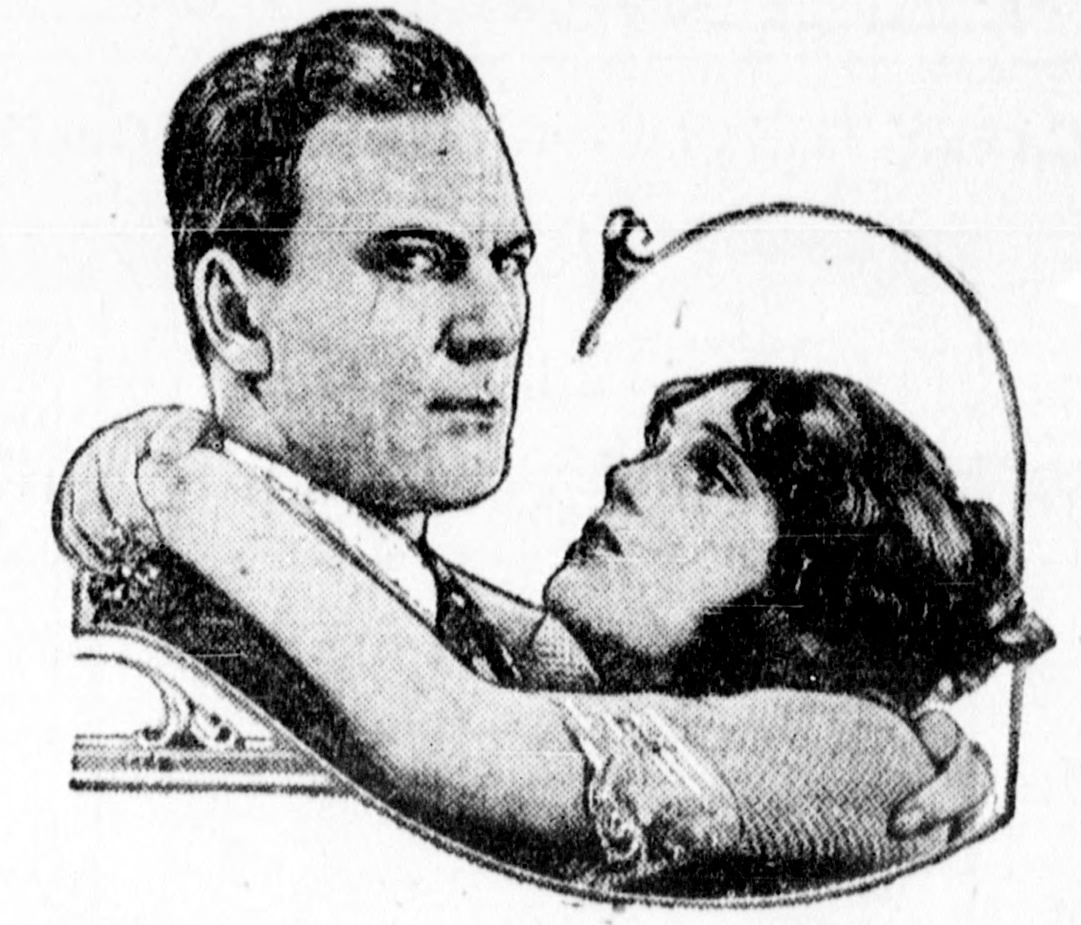
Meighan with co-star Pauline Starke in 1922, as they appeared in publicity for the film If You Believe It, It's So

Meighan achieved stardom in 1919. One of his better-known films of the period was that year's The Miracle Man, which featured Lon Chaney Sr.; it is now believed to be lost except for brief clips. This was followed with Cecil B. DeMille's Male and Female, which starred him with Gloria Swanson and Lila Lee. Most of that film's cast returned for the 1920 film Why Change Your Wife?, which co-starred Bebe Daniels. In April 1925, Meighan and Swanson produced a short film directed by Allan Dwan for the annual "Spring Gambol" for The Lambs. This film (sometimes known as Gloria Swanson Dialogue), made in Lee DeForest's sound-on-film Phonofilm process, was made as a joke for the live event, showing Swanson trying to crash the all-male club.

His popularity continued through the Roaring Twenties, during which he starred in several pictures. In 1924, he played in The Alaskan with Estelle Taylor and Anna May Wong. In 1927, Meighan starred in The City Gone Wild with Louise Brooks.

His final silents, both produced by Howard Hughes in 1928, were The Mating Call, which was critical of the Ku Klux Klan, and The Racket, which was nominated for an Academy Award for Best Picture. Both were thought lost until rediscovered in private collections in 2006; they were restored by University of Nevada, Las Vegas and shown on Turner Classic Movies.

=== Sound movies and career's end ===
Meighan's first sound feature film was The Argyle Case (1929). At this time, he was nearing 50; fearing his popularity might wane, he decided to go into real estate. It wasn't until 1931 that he returned to the screen with Young Sinners. He made four additional sound movies until illness sidelined him from acting. His last film was Peck's Bad Boy in 1934.

== Personal life ==
Meighan commanded a salary of $5,000 per week for much of his career. At one point, it reached $10,000 per week.

=== Marriage ===
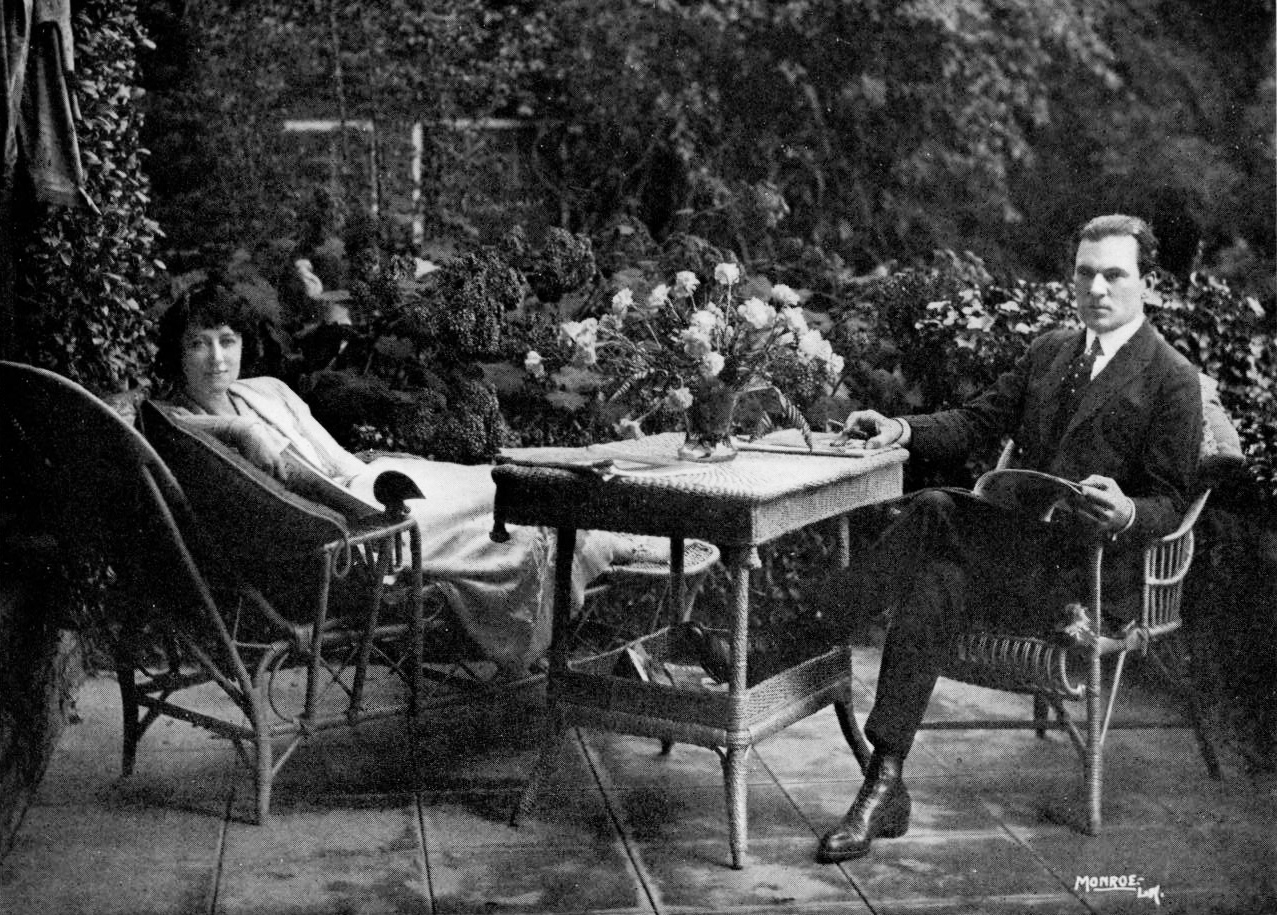
Meighan at home with his wife, Frances Ring

Meighan met Frances Ring (July 4, 1882 – January 15, 1951) when she was a stage actress on Broadway and he was appearing there. She was a younger sister of popular singer Blanche Ring and of vaudeville actress Julie Ring. Actor and director A. Edward Sutherland was a nephew of both Blanche Ring and Meighan. Sutherland's mother Julie was a sister of Blanche and Frances Ring.

Meighan and Ring became inseparable and soon married. They remained married until his death in 1936. Their marriage was considered happy and strong; one writer remarked "Thomas Meighan and Rin Tin Tin were the only Hollywood stars who had never seen a divorce court". The couple had no children.

=== Hollywood scandals ===
Meighan was involved in some of the more scandalous moments of silent film history, albeit as a helping hand. He was the sole witness to Jack Pickford and Olive Thomas's secretive wedding in New Jersey on October 25, 1916.

In March 1923, Douglas Gerrard, in need of help bailing his friend Rudolph Valentino out of jail for bigamy, called a fellow Irishman named Dan O'Brien who happened to be with Meighan at the time. Meighan barely knew Valentino but put up a large chunk of the bail money, and with the help of June Mathis and George Melford, Valentino was freed.

=== Florida ===
In the mid-1920s, Meighan became interested in Florida after talks with his realtor brother James E. Meighan. He bought property in Ocala, Florida in 1925. In 1927, he built a home in New Port Richey, Florida, where he was to spend his winters. He intended to shoot his film We're All Gamblers there; however, filming was moved to Miami.

The Meighans hoped to draw other celebrities to the area. On July 1, 1926, The Meighan Theatre opened with a screening of Meighan's movie The New Klondike. Meighan was not present but sent a congratulatory telegram.

In 1930, sound was added to the theatre. Meighan appeared this time, pushing the button to start the sound. The theatre closed in 1934, a victim of the Depression. It reopened in 1938 under the name The New Port Richey Theatre. The theatre is still open as a community playhouse, under the name Richey Suncoast Theatre.

== Death ==
In 1934, Meighan was diagnosed with cancer. The following year, he underwent surgery at Doctors Hospital in Manhattan. He succumbed to cancer at 9:10 pm on July 8, 1936, at his home in Great Neck, New York. Many of his family were present.

Meighan was originally buried at Calvary Cemetery in Queens. After resting there for almost a year, his remains were moved to a family plot at Saint Mary Cemetery in Meighan's hometown of Pittsburgh.

== Legacy ==
Meighan was a large donor to various Catholic charities and the Federation for the Support of Jewish Philanthropic Societies. Many of his later films survive and have been released on DVD.

== Selected filmography ==
Year	Title	Role	Notes
1914	Danny Donovan, the Gentleman Cracksman	Dandy Donovan, the Gentleman Cracksman	Short
1915	Kindling	'Honest' Heine Schultz	
1915	The Fighting Hope	Burton Temple	
1915	Out of the Darkness	Harvey Brooks	
1915	Blackbirds	Jack Doggins / Hon. Nevil Trask	
1915	The Secret Sin	Jack Herron	
1915	Armstrong's Wife	David Armstrong	
1915	The Immigrant	David Harding	
1915	Temptation		
1916	Pudd'nhead Wilson	Chambers	
1916	The Trail of the Lonesome Pine	Jack Hale	
1916	The Sowers	Prince Paul Alexis	
1916	The Clown	Dick Ordway	
1916	The Dupe	Jimmy Regan	
1916	Common Ground	Judge David Evans	
1916	The Storm	Robert Fielding	
1917	The Heir to the Hoorah	Joe Lacy	Directed by William C. deMille
1917	The Slave Market	John Barton	
1917	Sapho	Jean Gaussin	
1917	Sleeping Fires	David Gray	
1917	The Silent Partner	Edward Royle	
1917	Her Better Self	Dr. Robert Keith	
1917	The Mysterious Miss Terry	Gordon True	
1917	Arms and the Girl	Wilfred Ferrers	
1918	The Land of Promise	Frank Taylor	
1918	Madame Jealousy	Valour	
1918	Eve's Daughter	John Norton	
1918	M'Liss	Charles Gray	
1918	Missing	Sir William Farrel	
1918	Heart of the Wilds	Sergeant Tom Gellatly	
1918	In Pursuit of Polly	Colby Mason	
1918	Out of a Clear Sky	Robert Lawrence	
1918	The Forbidden City	John Worden	
1919	The Heart of Wetona	John Hardin	
1919	The Probation Wife	Harrison Wade	
1919	The Miracle Man	Tom Burke	
1919	The Thunderbolt	Bruce Corbin	
1919	Male and Female	William Crichton - The Butler	
1919	Peg o' My Heart	Sir Gerald Adair	
1920	Why Change Your Wife?	Robert Gordon	
1920	The Prince Chap	William Peyton	
1920	Civilian Clothes	Capt. Sam McGinnis	
1920	Conrad in Quest of His Youth	Conrad Warrener	
1921	Frontier of the Stars	Buck Leslie	
1921	The Easy Road	Leonard Fayne	
1921	The City of Silent Men	Jim Montgomery	
1921	White and Unmarried	Billy Kane	
1921	The Conquest of Canaan	Joe Louden	
1921	Cappy Ricks	Matt Peasley	
1921	A Prince There Was	Charles Edward Martin	
1922	The Bachelor Daddy	Richard Chester	
1922	Our Leading Citizen	Daniel Bentley, lawyer	
1922	If You Believe It, It's So	Chick Harris	
1922	Manslaughter	Daniel J. O'Bannon	
1922	The Man Who Saw Tomorrow	Burke Hammond	
1922	Back Home and Broke	Tom Redding	
1923	The Ne'er-Do-Well	Kirk Anthony	
1923	Homeward Bound	Jim Bedford	
1923	Hollywood	Thomas Meighan	
1923	Woman-Proof	Tom Rockwood	
1924	Pied Piper Malone	Jack Malone	Print held Gosfilmofond
1924	The Confidence Man	Dan Corvan	
1924	The Alaskan	Alan Holt	
1924	Tongues of Flame	Henry Harrington	
1925	Coming Through	Tom Blackford	
1925	Old Home Week	Tom Clark	
1925	The Man Who Found Himself	Tom Macauley	
1925	Irish Luck	Tom Donahue / Lord Fitzhugh	
1926	The New Klondike	Tom Kelly	
1926	Fascinating Youth	Thomas Meighan	
1926	Tin Gods	Roger Drake	
1926	The Canadian	Frank Taylor	
1927	Blind Alleys	Captain Dan Kirby	
1927	We're All Gamblers	Lucky Sam McCarver	
1927	The City Gone Wild	John Phelan	
1928	The Racket	Captain James McQuigg	
1928	The Mating Call	Leslie Hatten	
1929	The Argyle Case	Alexander Kayton	
1931	Young Sinners	Tom McGuire	
1931	Skyline	Gordon A. McClellan	
1932	Cheaters at Play	Michael Lanyard	
1932	Madison Square Garden	Bill Carley	
1934	Peck's Bad Boy	Henry Peck	
