= The Call of the Canyon (novel) =

1924 novel by Zane Grey

- Author: Zane Grey
- Language: English
- Genre: Western
- Publisher: Harper & Brothers
- Publication date: 1924
- Publication place: United States
- Pages: 291
- Preceded by: Tappan's Burro
- Followed by: Roping Lions in the Grand Canyon

The Call of the Canyon is a 1924 novel by Zane Grey.

== Plot introduction ==
It is the story of Glenn Kilbourne, a US Army veteran, who returns from the battlefields of World War I "shell-shocked and gassed", and otherwise incapacitated". It is set in the American West of the Roaring Twenties.
