= Edna May Sperl =

American silent film actress (1899-1981)

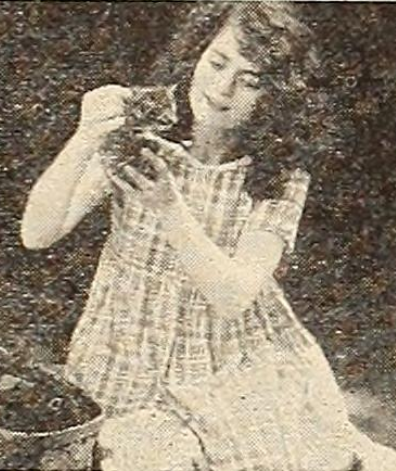
- Sperl c. 1922
- Born: May 30, 1899; Brooklyn, New York City
- Died: August 1981 (aged 81); Oneida, New York
- Occupation: Actress
- Years active: 1917–1924
- Notable work: Lonesome Corners; His Darker Self

Edna May Sperl (May 30, 1899 – August 1981) was an American silent film actress during the 1910s and 1920s. She was in actor and director Edgar Jones's films including Knight of the Pines and Cupid, Registered Guide, frequently as the leading woman. Alongside Jones, she also starred in the Holman Day series of seven two-reel films and the following series of films commissioned by Pathé Exchange. An avid enjoyer of the outdoors, Sperl stated that she loved the freedom of making films in the wilderness and the thrill of the dangerous stunts she was able to perform.

== Career ==
In 1919, Sperl became friends with actor Edgar Jones as he was beginning work on a series of new silent film productions for the photodrama company Big Woods. She accompanied him to his studio in Augusta, Maine, and the wooded regions of the state to work on becoming "known principally as a star of the great out-of-doors." The first series of Jones's films were completed in August 1920, where Sperl then took a month's vacation before returning at the end of September to begin the second drama series. She went on to become the leading woman in multiple Holman Day films. The success of the Holman Day series resulted in the film company Pathé Exchange hiring Jones and Sperl in August 1921 to make a new series of films set in the woods of Maine, beginning with 1921s The Black Ace.

During the filming of 1921s Caught in the Rapids with Jones, Sperl filmed a scene while on a raft in the middle of a river. Jones's role was to save her as a part of the film, but when the raft began breaking into pieces due to the rapids, he had to truly save her due to Sperl being a poor swimmer. In an article for the Orlando Evening Star, Sperl acknowledged that she enjoyed doing outdoors films the most because of the "freedom of the woods and plains", along with the "thrill of a lifetime" from the dangerous stunts and performances she was in. Her favorite character role was playing as Lora Farrell in Single-Handed Sam.

In October 1921, Sperl traveled with the other actors of Edgar Jones's studio to Wilkes-Barre, Pennsylvania, where the United States Motion Picture Company had commissioned them to use the area as their new filming studio and location.

== Personal life ==
While touring as a theater actress in Cleveland, Ohio, in 1916, Sperl met Sergeant William Caldwell Cottingham, son of Sherwin-Williams president Walter H. Cottingham. He was unaware that she was in the theater at the time, and they quickly became engaged. In March 1918, he attended her performance of The Rounder of Old Broadway for the first time, and they planned to be married after the show. Cottingham's father, however, had obtained the help of the sergeant's commanding officer at Camp Sheridan to have a federal marshal arrest him for abandoning his post in order to prevent the marriage from occurring.

== Theater ==
- The Leap Year Girls (1917)
- The Rounder of Old Broadway (1918) as the pickpocket

== Filmography ==
- Other Men's Shoes (1920)
- The Knight of the Pines (1920)
- The Devil Brew (1921)
- The Rider of the King Log (1921)
- Lochinvar o' the Line (1921) as the heroine
- Three and a Girl (1921)
- The Two Fisted Judge (1921)
- Caught in the Rapids (1921) as Elise Cormier
- A Forest Sampson (1921)
- The Timber Wolf (1921)
- Single-Handed Sam (1921) as Lora Farrell
- The Black Ace (1921)
- The Flaming Trail (1921)
- Dangerous Dollars (1921)
- Cupid, Registered Guide (1921) as Lana Candage
- The Law of the Woods (1922)
- The V That Vanished (1922)
- Lonesome Corners (1922) as Nola
- His Darker Self (1924) as Bill Jackson's Sweetheart
