= The Rider of the King Log =

1921 film

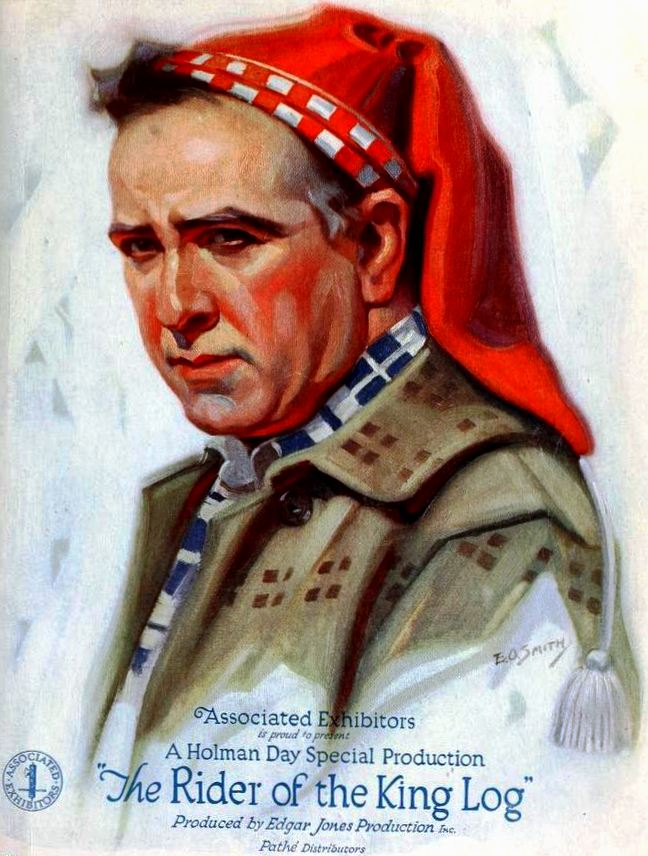
- Directed by: Harry O. Hoyt
- Written by: Holman Francis Day
- Produced by: Edgar Jones
- Starring: Frank Sheridan; Irene Boyle; Richard Travers
- Cinematography: Eugene French
- Production company: Associated Exhibitors
- Distributed by: Pathé Exchange
- Release date: May 1921
- Running time: 7 reels
- Country: United States
- Language: Silent (English intertitles)

The Rider of the King Log is a lost 1921 American silent action film directed by Harry O. Hoyt and starring Frank Sheridan, Irene Boyle, and Richard Travers. The film was the first feature shot entirely in Maine. It was originally set to be directed by and star Edgar Jones with Edna May Sperl as the leading lady. A rift between Jones and writer Holman Day led to the departure of Jones and Sperl from the project.

== Cast ==
- Frank Sheridan as John Xavier Kavanagh
- Irene Boyle as Clare Kavanagh
- Richard Travers as Kenneth Marthorn
- Emily Chichester as Cora Marthorn
- Arthur Donaldson as Stephen Marthorn
- Charles Slattery as Tim Mulkern
- Carlton Brickert as Donald Kezar
- John Woodford as Abner Kezar
- William Black as Warren Britt
- Albert Roccardi as Father Laflamme
- Bananas as the Black Bear

== Bibliography ==
- Goble, Alan. The Complete Index to Literary Sources in Film. Walter de Gruyter, 1999.
