= La Demoiselle de magasin =

Belgian play

La Demoiselle de magasin (The shop girl) is a 1913 theatrical play in three acts written by Belgians Frantz Fonson and Fernand Wicheler.

== Plot ==
An orphan girl, Claire, arrives in Brussels, Belgium, finds work in a furniture shop and rents from Monsieur Derrider, the shop's owner, a room upstairs to live. She proves to be an excellent salesperson, thus overcoming Derrider's initial misgivings about her, but Claire and Amelin, the shop owner's son, fall in love.

== History ==
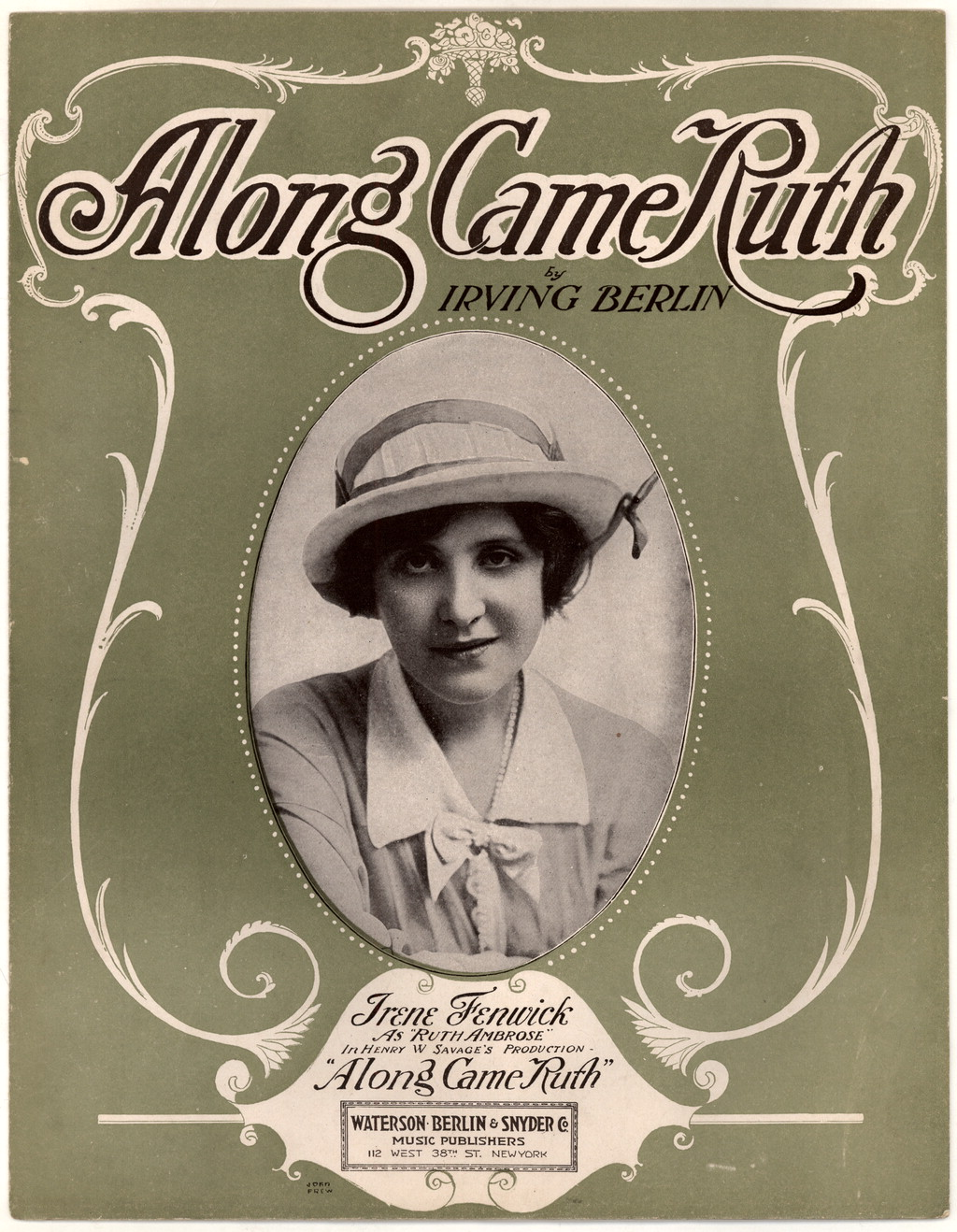
Sheet music cover for Irving Berlin's "Along Came Ruth". Irene Fenwick is pictured.

The play was first performed at the Théâtre du Gymnase in Paris, France, on 13 February 1913, featuring actors Jane Delmar as Claire Frénois, Alfred Jacque as Deridder, and Edmond Duquesne as Amelin.

An English-language theatrical version, Along Came Ruth, was written by Holman Day and Fonson and produced by Henry W. Savage, featuring Irene Fenwick as Ruth Ambrose. Irving Berlin wrote a song, called "Along Came Ruth", for the play. It opened at the Gaiety Theatre on 23 February 1914.

Along Came Ruth was then adapted into a 1924 silent movie, directed by Edward F. Cline and starring Viola Dana.

A Spanish version entitled La señorita del almacén was published at Madrid in the year following its premiere at the Victoria Eugenia Theatre in San Sebastián on September 26, 1913, as translated by Spaniard writer Sinibaldo Gutiérrez.

== Critical reception ==
In Revue des deux Mondes, the play's authors, and particularly Fonson, were credited with introducing in France the theatre of Belgium and allowing "the French spirit to acknowledge Wallonian verve and good humor," noting that both Fonson's plays staged in France, Mademoiselle Beulemans and Demoiselle de magasin, were "popular successes."

In 1924, the play was staged at St. James Hall in Sydney, Australia, where, according to a review, "the story of the clever shop girl unfolded with considerable vivacity." In L'Express du Midi, after a theatrical company toured in 1926 the south of France with it, the play was said to "refresh the soul" of the reviewer.

== See also ==
- La Demoiselle de magasin, painting by James Tissot
