= Sally Long =

American actress

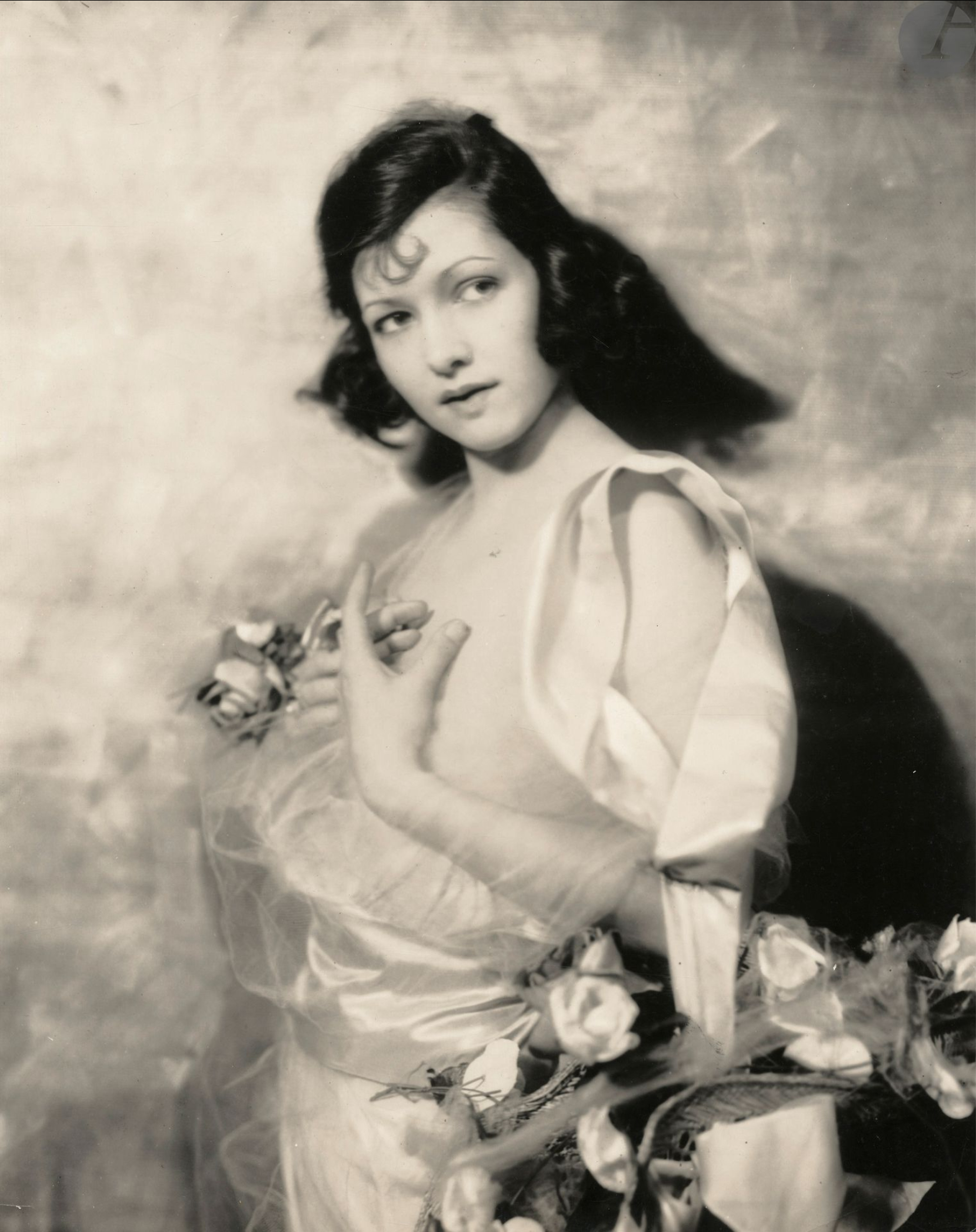
- Long photographed by Alfred Cheney Johnston, 1921
- Born: December 5, 1901; Kansas City, Missouri, U.S.
- Died: August 12, 1987 (aged 85); Newport Beach, California
- Occupations: Dancer, actress
- Spouse: Leo Bovette Tuey (m. 1916–div. 1926)
- Children: 2

Sally Long (December 5, 1901 – August 12, 1987) was an American dancer and actress.

== Early years ==
Long was the daughter of Mr. and Mrs. Louis J. Long. She graduated from Eden Hall in Philadelphia, Pennsylvania in 1921.

== Dancer ==
Florenz Ziegfeld insured Long for $100,000 against the possibility of her falling in love or marrying when she danced for his Ziegfeld Follies in the early 1920s. (Long later revealed that at that time she was already married with two children.) After performing with the Follies, Long appeared in the 1922 edition of the New York City revue George White's Scandals. Her rising popularity secured her a role in the cast of Kid Boots. Composer Milton Ager said Long was his inspiration for the song, I Wonder What's Become of Sally.

== Film star ==
Long's first film experience came when Jesse Lasky secured fourteen of the prettiest women for parts in his The Dressmaker from Paris (1925). Produced by Famous Players, Long's character was noticed on the screen by filmmaker D.W. Griffith. Soon she appeared in a motion picture with Leatrice Joy.

Rudolph Valentino picked Long to play the leading female role in The Hooded Falcon. However her contract with Valentino expired before the film was made. Valentino changed his mind about the movie he wished to make. He decided to do a motion picture that called for a blonde female lead.

In 1926, Long signed a five-year contract with A. H. Sebastian, Hollywood producer and executive head of Sebastian-Belasco Productions. Her first part with Sebastian was in Fifth Avenue (1926), playing a Greenwich Village girl. She next starred with Buck Jones in a Pathe Pictures production of the comedy, The Fighting Buckaroo (1926).

She was selected as one of the WAMPAS Baby Stars of 1926 along with Joan Crawford, Fay Wray, Mary Brian, Joyce Compton, and eight others. In 1927 she appeared in the serial King of the Jungle with Elmo Lincoln. Long's final screen appearances came in Cock o' the Walk (1930) and Traffic Tangle (1930). She studied voice beginning in 1932 with director Mitchell Leisen.

== Personal life ==
Long married Leo Bovette Tuey in Kansas City in 1916, when she was fifteen years old. The couple had two children. Long divorced Tuey on January 19, 1926. She explained that she kept her marriage to Tuey a secret because it might have inhibited her career advancement.

She resided for a time with her mother in a large Spanish-style house at 628 Rodeo Drive in Beverly Hills, California. In August 1926 she moved to a smaller house in the Mexican Village a few blocks away, at 251 Crescent Drive.

Long died in Newport Beach, California in 1987, aged 85.

== Selected filmography ==
- His Darker Self (1924)
- The Dressmaker from Paris (1925)
- The Fighting Buckaroo (1926)
- Fifth Avenue (1926)
- The Border Whirlwind (1926)
- Going the Limit (1926)
- The Man in the Saddle (1926)
- King of the Jungle (1927)
- The Thrill Seekers (1927)
- When Danger Calls (1927)
- The Kid Sister (1927)
- Cock o' the Walk (1930)
