= Lovely Mary =

1916 film by Edgar Jones

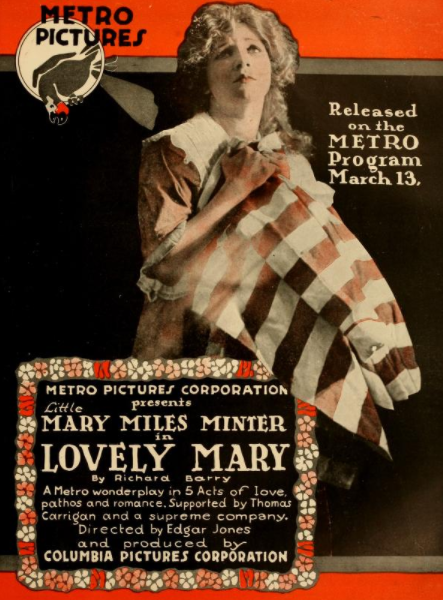
- Directed by: Edgar Jones
- Written by: Richard Barry
- Produced by: Louis B. Mayer
- Starring: Mary Miles Minter
- Distributed by: Metro Pictures
- Release date: March 13, 1916 (United States)
- Running time: 5 reels
- Country: United States
- Languages: Silent; English intertitles

Lovely Mary is a 1916 silent drama film directed by Edgar Jones and starring Mary Miles Minter. As with many of Minter's features, it is thought to be a lost film.

== Plot ==
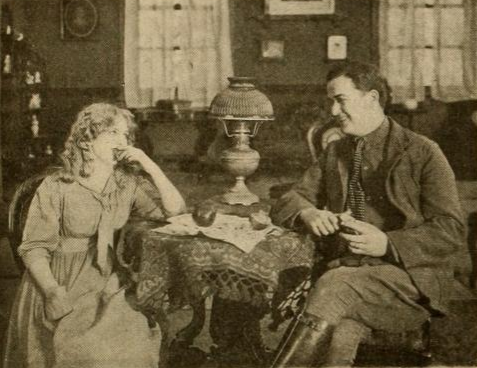
Mary Miles Minter in "Lovely Mary" (1916)

As detailed in film magazines, the film is set in the Florida Everglades in 1901, at which point state law permitted citizens to employ convicts. Mary Lane is the last heiress of a southern family, whose inheritance consists of a plot of land. Manning and Dempster, representatives of competing real estate firms, bid to buy this land. Dempster schemes to buy the land at a price far below its worth, and when a neighbour discovers, Dempster shoots the neighbour and frames Manning for the crime. Manning is found guilty and sentenced to hard labour.

Mary, who has fallen in love with Manning and does not believe him to be guilty, convinces the governor to let her employ him on her estate. Meanwhile, a fight between Dempster and a witness to the murder, and a dying confession, result in the evidence of Manning's innocence. The film ends with Manning's release, his marriage to Mary, and the promise of their happy future on the plot of land, which they have decided to keep.

== Cast ==
- Mary Miles Minter as Mary Lane
- Frank DeVernon as Claiborne Ogilvie Lane
- Russell Simpson as Peter Nelson
- Schuyler Ladd as Oscar Nelson
- Ferdinand Tidmarsh as Wade Dempster
- Myra Brooks as Aunt Becky
- Harry Blakemore as Uncle Joe
- Thomas Carrigan as Ronald Manning
