= The Big Punch =

1921 film directed by John Ford

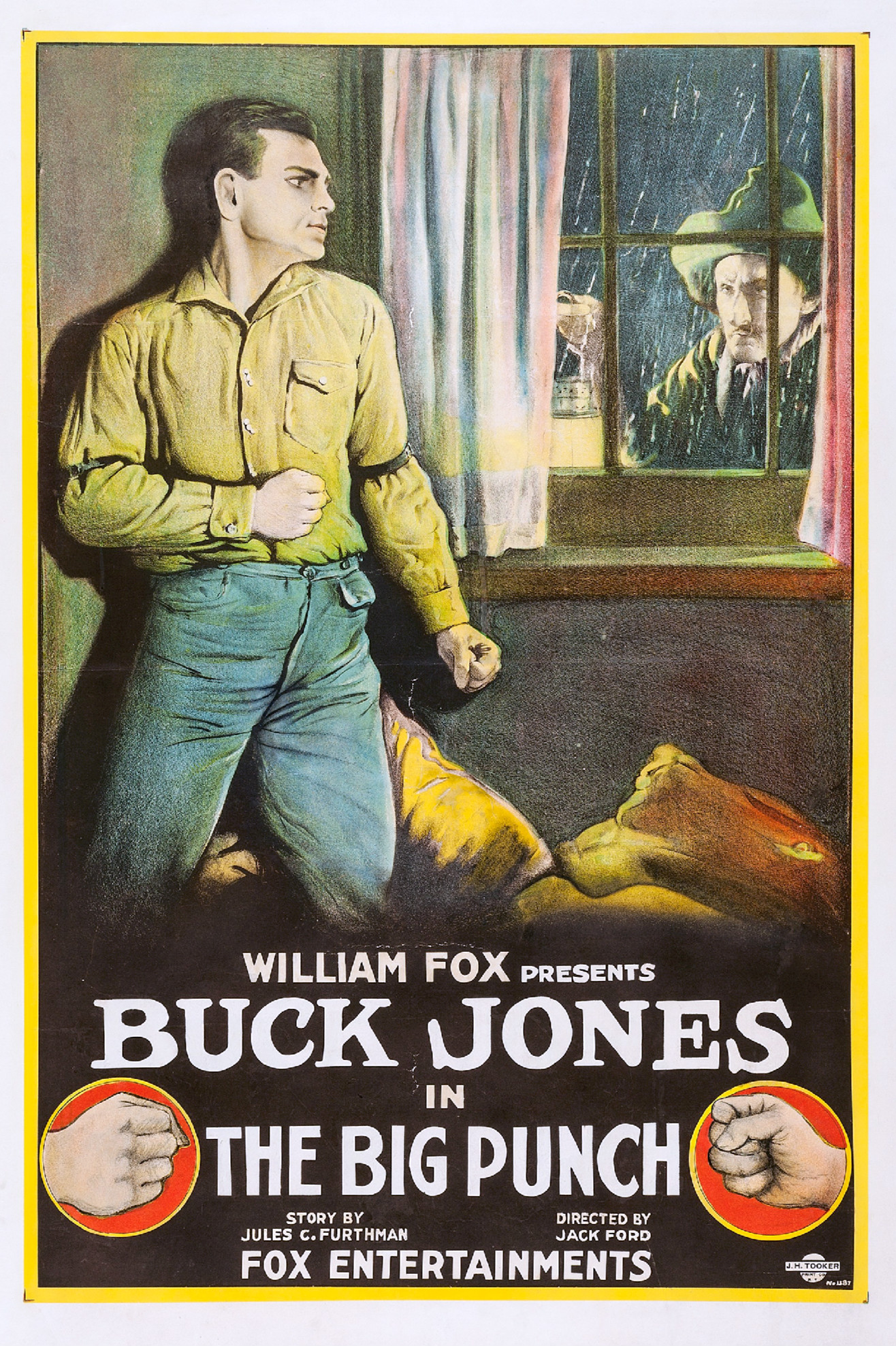
- Original theatrical poster
- Directed by: John Ford
- Written by: John Ford; Jules Furthman
- Produced by: William Fox
- Starring: Buck Jones; Barbara Bedford
- Cinematography: Frank B. Good
- Distributed by: Fox Film Corporation
- Release date: February 13, 1921
- Running time: 50 minutes
- Country: United States
- Languages: Silent; English intertitles

The Big Punch is a 1921 American silent Western film directed by John Ford. No copy of the film is known to survive in either a public repository or private collection, so it is currently presumed to be a lost film. In France, the film was known under the title Un homme libre ("A Free Man").

== Plot ==
As summarized in a film publication, Buck consents to study for the ministry, and before leaving attempts to convince his worthless brother Jed to sober up and stay home with their mother during Buck's absence. On the eve of his leaving Buck is implicated in a murder committed by Jed and his gang. Buck serves two years and upon his release completes his study for the ministry before returning home. People ridicule him and laugh at the "jailbird minister," as they call him. During one of his services, his brother and two pals enter the church to hide from the prison officials who are after them. Buck shields them, and they later come to his aid when Flash McGraw, the owner of a dance hall, has lured Hope Standish, a Salvation Army girl, to his room, and Buck has to fight the whole gang. A girl who believes McGraw is "throwing her over" reveals that McGraw "framed" the murder charge on Jed and his pals. This gives the men their freedom and clears Buck, leaving him free to marry the Salvation Army girl.

== Cast ==
- Buck Jones as Buck
- Barbara Bedford as Hope Standish
- Jack Curtis as Jed
- George Siegmann as Flash McGraw
- Jack McDonald as Friend of Jed's
- Al Fremont as Friend of Jed's
- Jennie Lee as Buck's Mother
- Edgar Jones as The Sheriff
- Irene Hunt as Dance Hall Girl

== Preservation ==
With no holdings located in archives, The Big Punch is considered a lost film.

== See also ==
- 1937 Fox vault fire
- List of Fox Film films
