= The Girl Who Wouldn't Quit =

- Directed by: Edgar Jones
- Written by: James Oliver Curwood (story "The Quest of Joan"); Doris Schroeder
- Produced by: Louise Lovely
- Starring: Louise Lovely; Henry A. Barrows; Mark Fenton
- Cinematography: Jack MacKenzie
- Production company: Universal Pictures
- Distributed by: Universal Pictures
- Release date: March 13, 1918
- Running time: 50 minutes
- Country: United States
- Languages: Silent; English intertitles

The Girl Who Wouldn't Quit is a 1918 American silent drama film directed by Edgar Jones and starring Louise Lovely, Henry A. Barrows and Mark Fenton.

== Cast ==
- Louise Lovely as Joan Tracy
- Henry A. Barrows as Roscoe Tracy
- Mark Fenton as Joshua Siddons
- Charles Hill Mailes as Robert Carter
- Gertrude Astor as Stella Carter
- William Chester as Joe Morgan
- Philo McCullough as Jim Younger

== Bibliography ==
- Robert B. Connelly. The Silents: Silent Feature Films, 1910-36, Volume 40, Issue 2. December Press, 1998.
