= Going the Limit (1926 film) =

1926 film

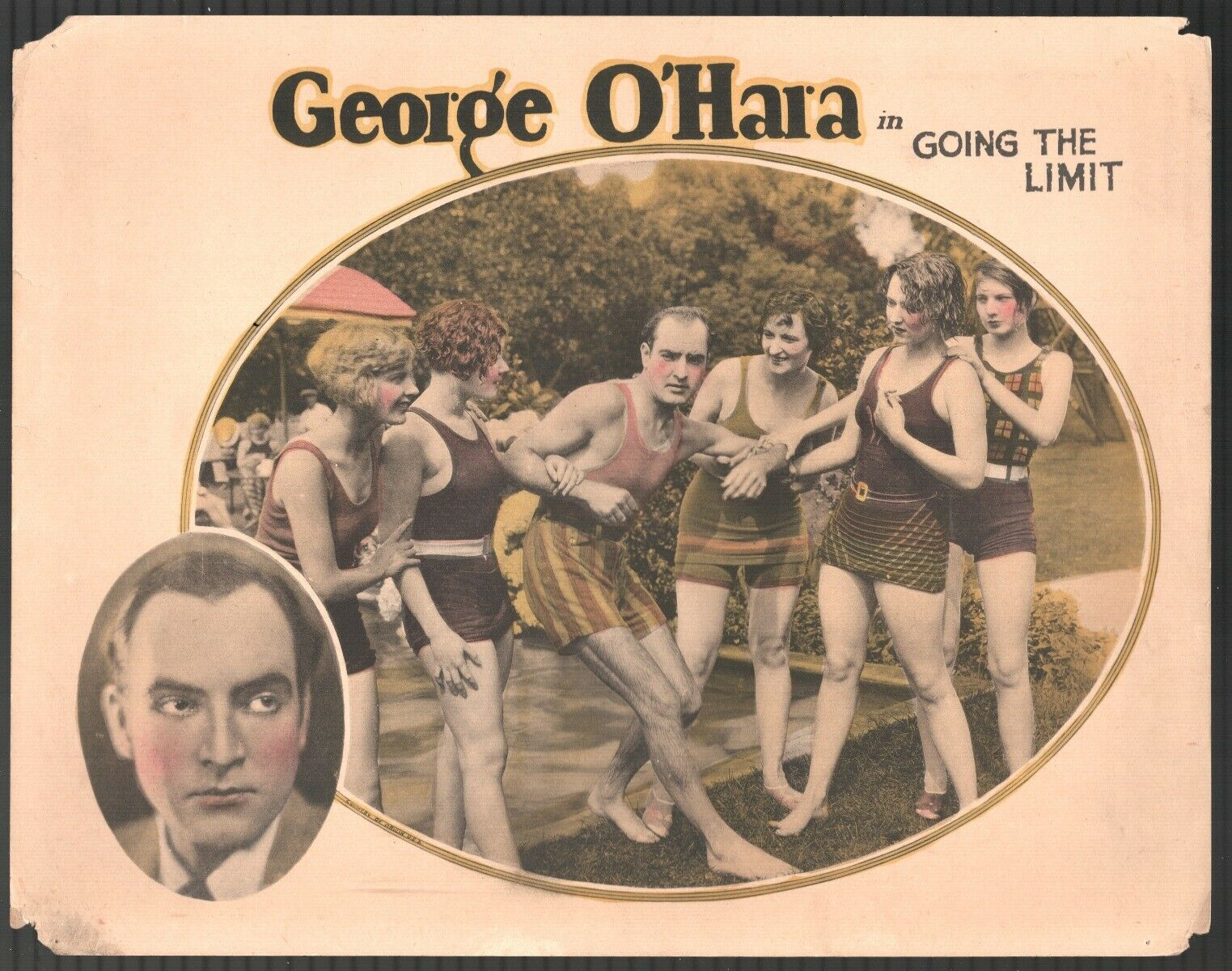
- Directed by: Chester Withey
- Written by: Arthur Ebenhack
- Produced by: Joseph P. Kennedy
- Starring: George O'Hara; Sally Long; Brooks Benedict
- Cinematography: André Barlatier
- Production company: Robertson-Cole Pictures Corporation
- Distributed by: Film Booking Offices of America; Ideal Films (UK)
- Release date: September 12, 1926
- Running time: 50 minutes
- Country: United States
- Languages: Silent; English intertitles

Going the Limit is a 1926 American silent comedy film directed by Chester Withey and starring George O'Hara, Sally Long and Brooks Benedict. It is loosely inspired by the plot of George Barr McCutcheon's Brewster's Millions, also featuring a central character who is trying to lose money.

== Synopsis ==
Gordon Emery hopes to marry the wealthy Estelle Summers but is ashamed of his own lack of money. He then hears that he is the sole heir of a fortune of two million dollars from his uncle. Estelle refuses to marry him, however, unless he loses all of it. Convinced that the best way to do this will be to get arrested and compel his uncle to disinherit him, he tries a to get arrested in a variety of ways but keeps failing to do so and is even commended for preventing a bank robbery.

== Cast ==
- George O'Hara as Gordon Emery
- Sally Long as Estelle Summers
- Brooks Benedict as George Stanways
- Tom Ricketts as Mortimer Harden
- Murdock MacQuarrie as Simson Windsor

== Bibliography ==
- Connelly, Robert B. The Silents: Silent Feature Films, 1910-36, Volume 40, Issue 2. December Press, 1998.
- Munden, Kenneth White. The American Film Institute Catalog of Motion Pictures Produced in the United States, Part 1. University of California Press, 1997.
