= King of the Jungle (serial) =

1927 film

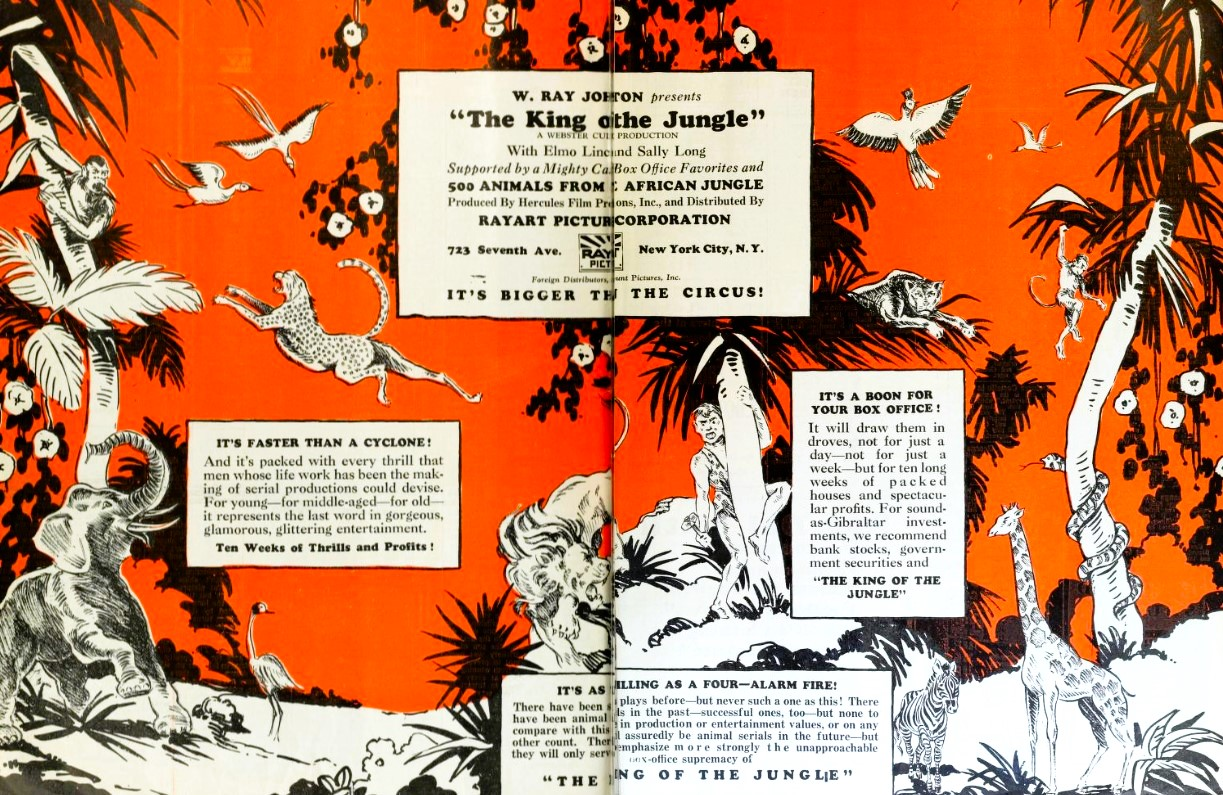
- Advertisement
- Directed by: Webster Cullison
- Starring: Elmo Lincoln; Sally Long
- Production company: Hercules Film Productions
- Distributed by: Rayart Pictures Corporation
- Release date: July 1927
- Running time: 10 episodes
- Country: United States
- Language: Silent (English intertitles)

King of the Jungle is a 1927 American adventure film serial directed by Webster Cullison. The film is considered to be lost; only a trailer remains.

== Cast ==
- Elmo Lincoln
- Sally Long
- Gordon Standing
- George Kotsonaros
- Arthur Morrison
- Cliff Bowes
- Virginia True Boardman

== Production ==
Gordon Standing, a friend of co-star Elmo Lincoln, was killed after being mauled by a lion during production. Lincoln believed that the death had been preventable and it led to his temporary retirement from the film industry.

== Chapter titles ==
1. The Great Tragedy
2. The Elephant Avenger
3. Battling for Her Life
4. Into the Lion’s Jaws
5. The Striped Terror
6. Gripped by the Death Vice
7. The Slinking Demons
8. The Giant Ape Strikes
9. No Escape
10. The Death Trap

== See also ==
- List of film serials
- List of film serials by studio
