= The Dressmaker from Paris =

1925 film

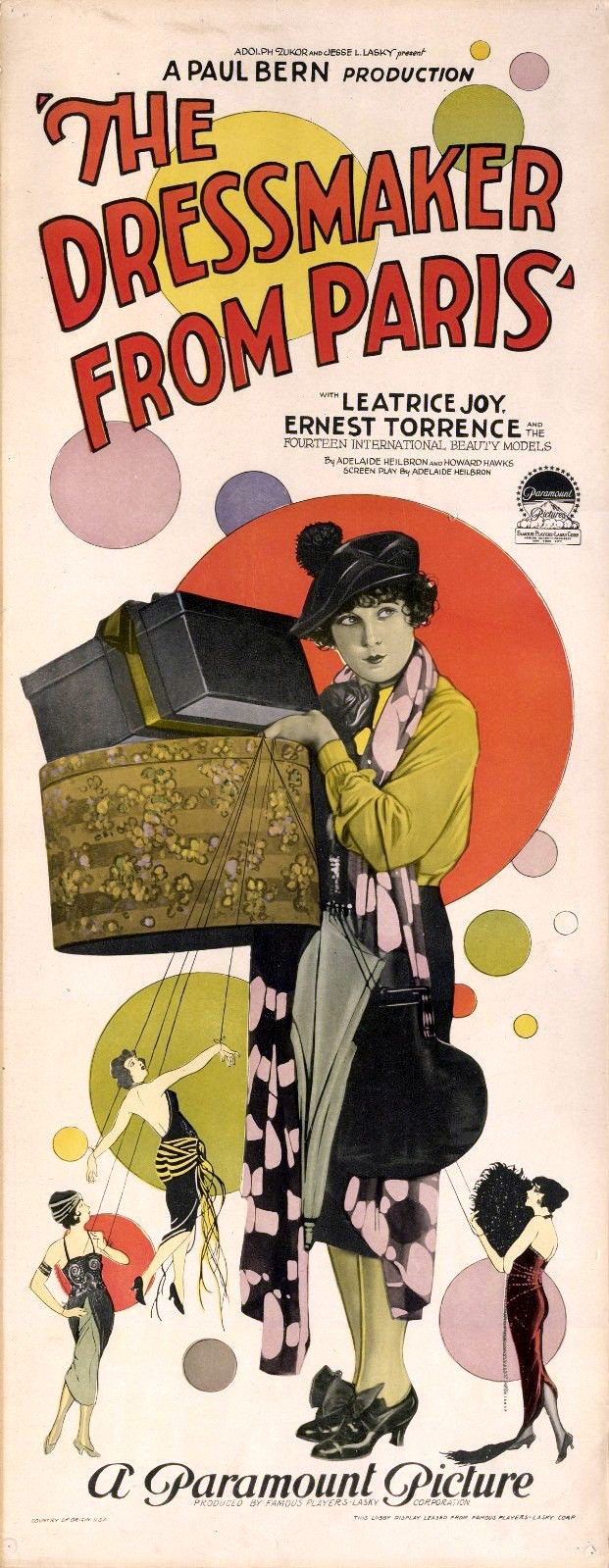
- Film poster
- Directed by: Paul Bern
- Screenplay by: Adelaide Heilbron
- Story by: Howard Hawks; Adelaide Heilbron
- Produced by: Adolph Zukor; Jesse Lasky; Cecil B. DeMille
- Starring: Leatrice Joy
- Distributed by: Paramount Pictures
- Release date: March 30, 1925 (U.S.)
- Running time: 80 minutes
- Country: United States
- Language: Silent (English intertitles)

The Dressmaker from Paris is a 1925 American silent romantic comedy drama film directed by Paul Bern. The story was written by Howard Hawks and Adelaide Heilbron. Heilbron also wrote the screenplay. The film starred Leatrice Joy and was her last film for Paramount Pictures. The film was costume designer Travis Banton's first assignment.

== Plot ==
As described in a film magazine review, an American soldier billeted in Paris meets a student of fashion design. She falls in love with him. Back in America, for the purpose of exhibiting recent fashions, she is brought to the small town in which he manages a department store. Her mannequins accompany her. She surprises him and their romance continues.

== Cast ==
- Leatrice Joy as Fifi
- Ernest Torrence as Angus McGregor
- Allan Forrest as Billy Brent
- Mildred Harris as Joan McGregor
- Lawrence Gray as Allan Stone
- Charles Crockett as Mayor
- Rosemary Cooper as Mayor's Daughter
- Spec O'Donnell as Jim
- Olive Borden as Mannequin (uncredited)
- Majel Coleman as Mannequin (uncredited)
- Yola d'Avril as Mannequin (uncredited)
- Cecille Evans as Mannequin (uncredited)
- Eugenia Gilbert as Mannequin (uncredited)
- Betsy Ann Hisle as Mannequin (uncredited)
- Anastasia Georgina Kissel as Mannequin (uncredited)
- Etta Lee as Mannequin (uncredited)
- Jocelyn Lee as Mannequin (uncredited)
- Sally Long as Mannequin (uncredited)
- Adalyn Mayer as Mannequin (uncredited)
- Christina Montt as Mannequin (uncredited)
- Clara Morris as Mannequin (uncredited)
- Sally Rand as Mannequin (uncredited)
- Dorothy Seastrom as Mannequin (uncredited)

== Production ==
Director Paul Bern has his girlfriend Olive Borden in a small role as one of the models. This was Leatrice Joy's last silent film for Paramount. Afterwards, she followed Cecil DeMille to his PDC arrangement production company, which released through the Pathé Exchange company.

== Preservation ==
With no prints of The Dressmaker from Paris located in any film archives, it is a lost film.
