= His Darker Self =

1924 silent film

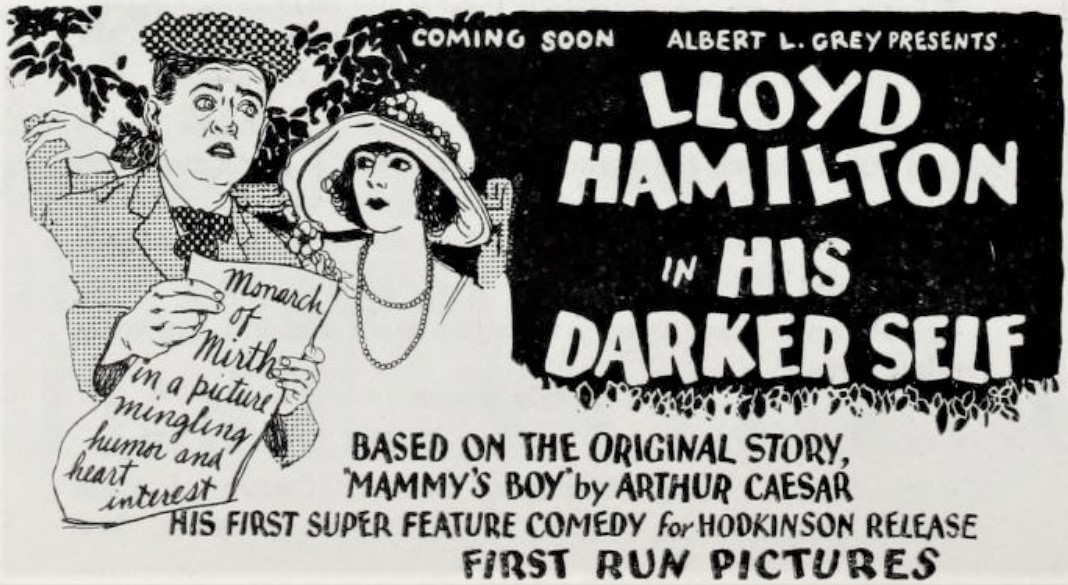
- Directed by: John W. Noble
- Written by: Ralph Spence
- Based on: "Mammy's Boy" by Arthur Caesar
- Produced by: Albert L. Grey
- Starring: Lloyd Hamilton; Tom Wilson; Sally Long
- Production companies: G. & H. Pictures
- Distributed by: Hodkinson Pictures
- Release date: March 16, 1924
- Running time: 50 minutes
- Country: United States
- Language: Silent (English intertitles)

His Darker Self is a 1924 American silent blackface comedy film directed by John W. Noble and starring Lloyd Hamilton, Tom Wilson, and Sally Long. The plot involves a self-taught small town detective who, after a Black friend is killed, goes undercover in blackface. The film is based on "Mammy's Boy" by Arthur Caesar. A print of His Darker Self exists.

== Plot ==
As described in a film magazine review, Uncle Eph, the old Black servant of the Sappington family, hauls liquor at night to Bill Jackson's dancehall. Jackson, in a fit of temper, knocks out Eph and fatally stabs another man. Eph is blamed for the crime. Claude Sappington, in love with the governor's daughter, but frowned upon by her father, blackens his face and visits Darktown in an attempt to discover the real murderer. After many wild adventures, he succeeds in making Jackson confess, saves old Eph, and marries the woman he loves.

== Cast ==
- Lloyd Hamilton as Claude Sappington
- Tom Wilson as Bill Jackson
- Tom O'Malley as Uncle Eph
- Lucille La Verne as Aunt Lucy
- Irma Harrison as Darktown's Cleopatra
- Edna May Sperl as Bill Jackson's Sweetheart
- Sally Long as Claude's Sweetheart
- Kate Bruce as Claude's Mother
- Warren Cook as The Governor
- Jack Oakie (uncredited)

== Production ==
Al Jolson was originally cast as the lead in His Darker Self, but he dropped out to protect his stage career. Lloyd Hamilton, a veteran of many comedy short films, replaced Jolson. Jolson would later use blackface while starring in the first talking picture, The Jazz Singer (1927).

== Bibliography ==
- Munden, Kenneth White (1997). The American Film Institute Catalog of Motion Pictures Produced in the United States, Part 1. University of California Press.
- Steinmetz, Jay Douglas (2017). Beyond Free Speech and Propaganda: The Political Development of Hollywood, 1907–1927. Lanham, Maryland: Lexington Books. ISBN 978-1-4985-5681-1.
