= Her Scrambled Ambition =

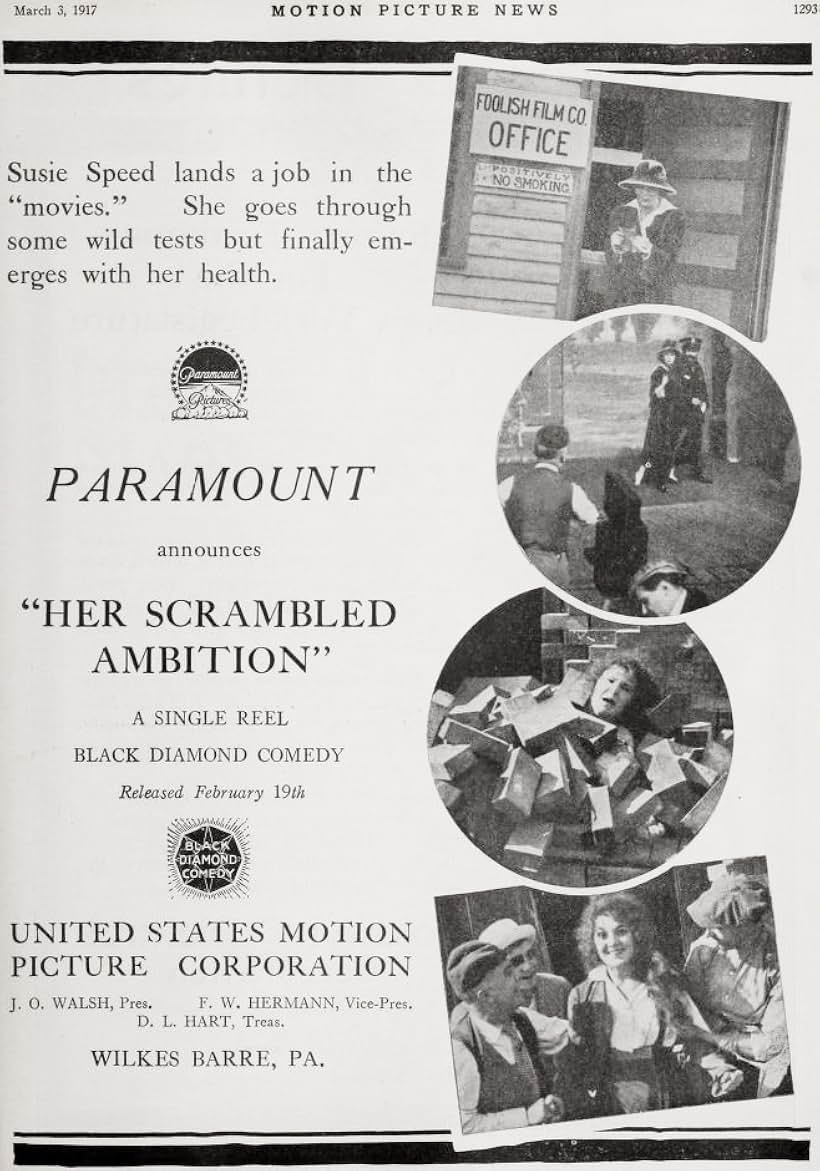
- Written by: Horace G. Plimpton; Rex A. Taylor; James O. Walsh
- Starring: Leatrice Joy
- Production company: United States Motion Picture Corporation
- Distributed by: Paramount Pictures
- Release date: February 1917
- Country: United States
- Languages: Silent; English intertitles

Her Scrambled Ambition was an American silent short comedy film produced by United States Motion Picture Corporation under the name Black Diamond Comedy. The film starred Leatrice Joy, and was released February 1, 1917 by Paramount Pictures.

== Preservation status ==
No prints of this film are known to survive.

== Synopsis ==
The film follows the story of Susie (Joy), who, upon learning the vast amounts of money to be made in show business, decides she wants to be a star. She sees an ad in club saying “Comedian Wanted” and decides to apply. She gets a try-out and then completes a series of tasks which delight the director who wants to try her in the real scene. They return to the studio where Sue is put into a scene where she is supposed to be kidnapped by some rough men. The director tells her to fight back and she takes his words to heart.

In true comedic fashion, Sue fights back hard and destroys not only the set she is on but a neighboring one as well. The director tells the gang to stop her and when they try she begins pulling bricks from an archway and throwing them at her assaulters. Eventually, the arch is so weakened that it falls on top of her, burying her. The director rescues her and says the job is hers. She is so excited and asks what her pay will be, however when the director tells her only $9.00 a week she picks up a brick and knocks herself out.
