= Other Men's Shoes =

1920 film directed by Edgar Lewis

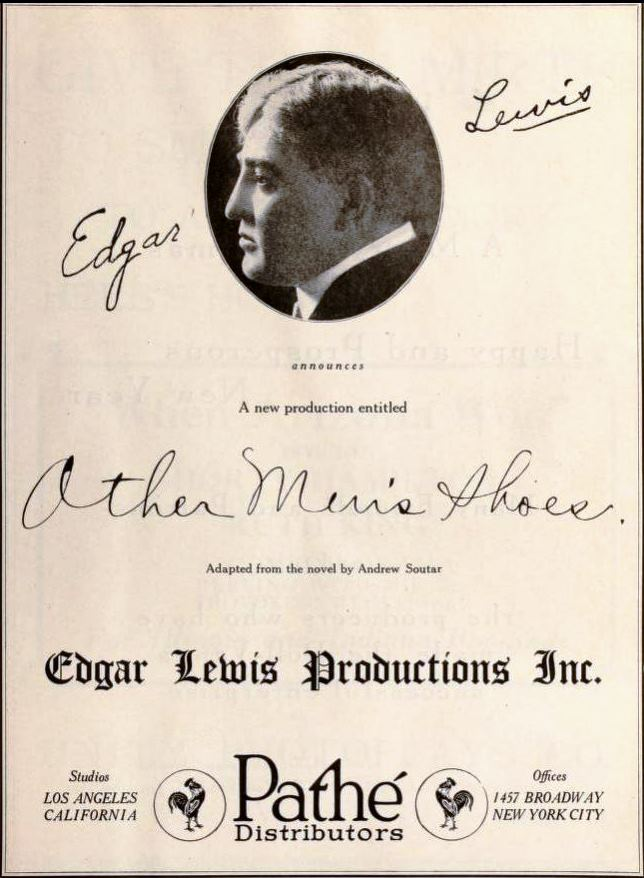
- Advertisement
- Directed by: Edgar Lewis
- Written by: George DuBois Proctor
- Based on: Other Men's Shoes by Andrew Soutar
- Produced by: Edgar Lewis
- Starring: Crauford Kent; Irene Boyle; Stephen Grattan
- Cinematography: Edward Horn
- Production company: Edgar Lewis Productions
- Distributed by: Pathé Exchange
- Release date: February 1, 1920
- Running time: 7 reels
- Country: United States
- Language: Silent (English intertitles)

Other Men's Shoes is a 1920 American silent drama film directed by Edgar Lewis and starring Crauford Kent in a dual role, Irene Boyle, and Stephen Grattan.

The film was translated from a Dutch print by Edward Lorusso and produced for DVD with a score by David Drazin in 2022.

== Cast ==
- Crauford Kent as Stephen Browning
- Irene Boyle as Irene Manton
- Stephen Grattan as Dr. Manton
- Jean Armour as Marion Browning
- Harold Foshay as Jacob Dreener
- John P. Wade as Raphael Creeke
- Phil Sanford as Paget
- Bobby Connelly as 'Doady'
- Edna May Sperl as Ethel Smith

== Bibliography ==
- Goble, Alan. The Complete Index to Literary Sources in Film. Walter de Gruyter, 1999.
