= Lonesome Corners =

1922 silent film

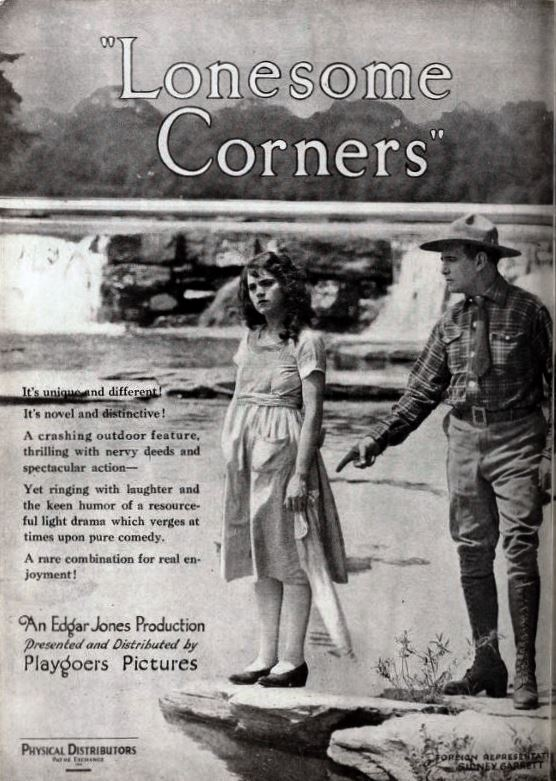
- Directed by: Edgar Jones
- Written by: Edgar Jones
- Produced by: Edgar Jones
- Starring: Edgar Jones; Henry Van Bousen; Edna Sperl; Lillian Lorraine
- Production company: Playgoers Pictures
- Distributed by: Pathé Exchange
- Release date: April 3, 1922
- Running time: 50 minutes
- Country: United States
- Languages: Silent; English intertitles

Lonesome Corners is a 1922 American silent comedy drama film directed by Edgar Jones and starring Jones, Edna May Sperl, Henry Van Bousen and Lillian Lorraine.

== Plot ==
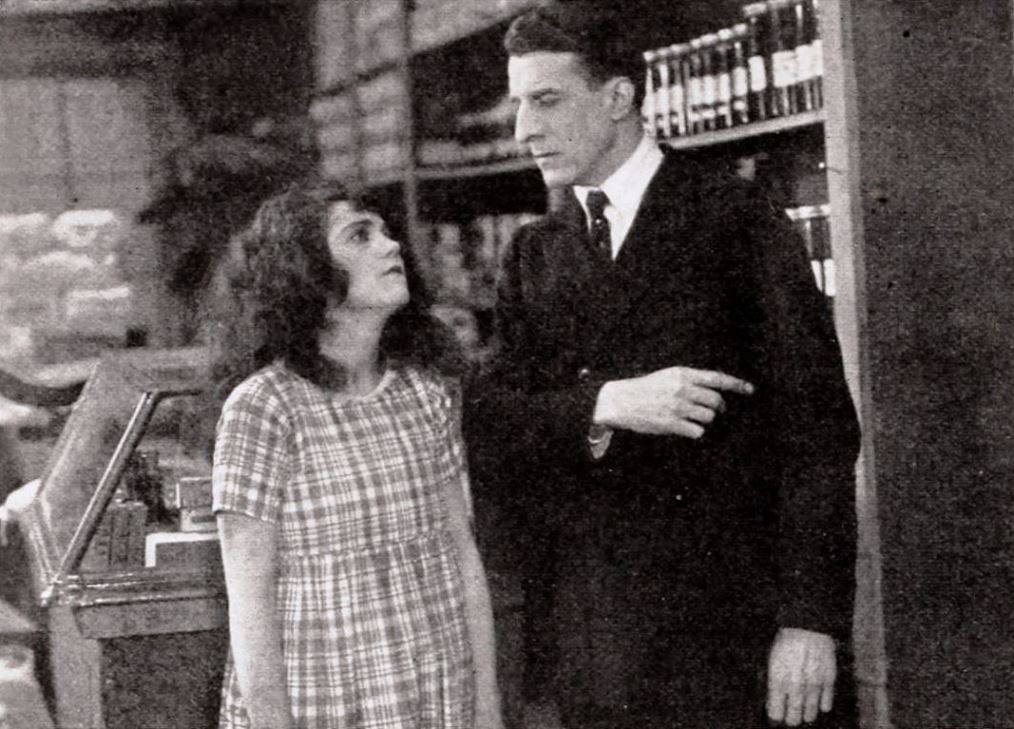
Still of Edna Sperl and Edgar Jones in Lonesome Corners

Henry Warburon (portrayed by Henry Van Bousen) is a wilderness dweller; his wife, Nola Warburton (portrayed by Edna May Sperl) is a taciturn individual, devoid of any social graces and refinement. A friend, Grant Hamilton (portrayed by Edgar Jones), recruits a chaperone to assist him in kidnapping Nola and together, the two attempt to tutor her in efforts to improve her deportment. While his wife is missing, Henry receives frequent correspondence describing his improvements in his wife's attitude and mannerisms. He attempts to locate his wife, but his efforts are unsuccessful.

In the final letter Henry receives, he is notified that he has become a father. One year later, Henry travels to New York to claim an inheritance and is reunited with Nola, who is markedly refined, and eager to become the perfect consort for her now-wealthy husband.

== Cast ==
- Edgar Jones as Grant Hamilton
- Henry Van Bousen as Henry Warburon
- Edna May Sperl as Nola
- Walter P. Lewis as Jake Fowler
- Lillian Lorraine as Martha Forrest

== Bibliography ==
- Lynn Kear and James King. Evelyn Brent: The Life and Films of Hollywood's Lady Crook. McFarland, 2009.
