= Her Fractured Voice =

- Starring: Beatrice Joy
- Production company: United States Motion Picture Corporation
- Distributed by: Paramount Pictures
- Release date: June 1917
- Running time: 15 minutes
- Country: United States
- Languages: Silent; English intertitles

Her Fractured Voice is a 1917 American short silent comedy film starring Leatrice Joy (billed as Beatrice Joy). The film was produced by United States Motion Picture Corporation under the "Black Diamond Comedies" name.

== Preservation status ==
A copy of the film is preserved at the Prelinger Archives.

== Cast ==
- Leatrice Joy - (*as Beatrice Joy)
- Mildred Davis - Girl with bow ribbon (*unconfirmed, but looks like her)

== Plot ==
A young woman (Joy) is obsessed with the idea that she can and must sing. Living on a farm, she has much open space in which to exercise her voice, but is compelled to admit that not even the farm animals will listen to her.

During an opportunity to sing in the choir, she awakens every living thing, among others, a number of peacefully sleeping members of the congregation.

From the city comes a smooth-talking man who promises her the world if she will only be his. They go to the big city where, at a trial given to her in a cabaret, she nearly causes a riot, before the inevitable happy ending.
