= Holman Day House =

Historic house in Maine, United States

- U.S. National Register of Historic Places
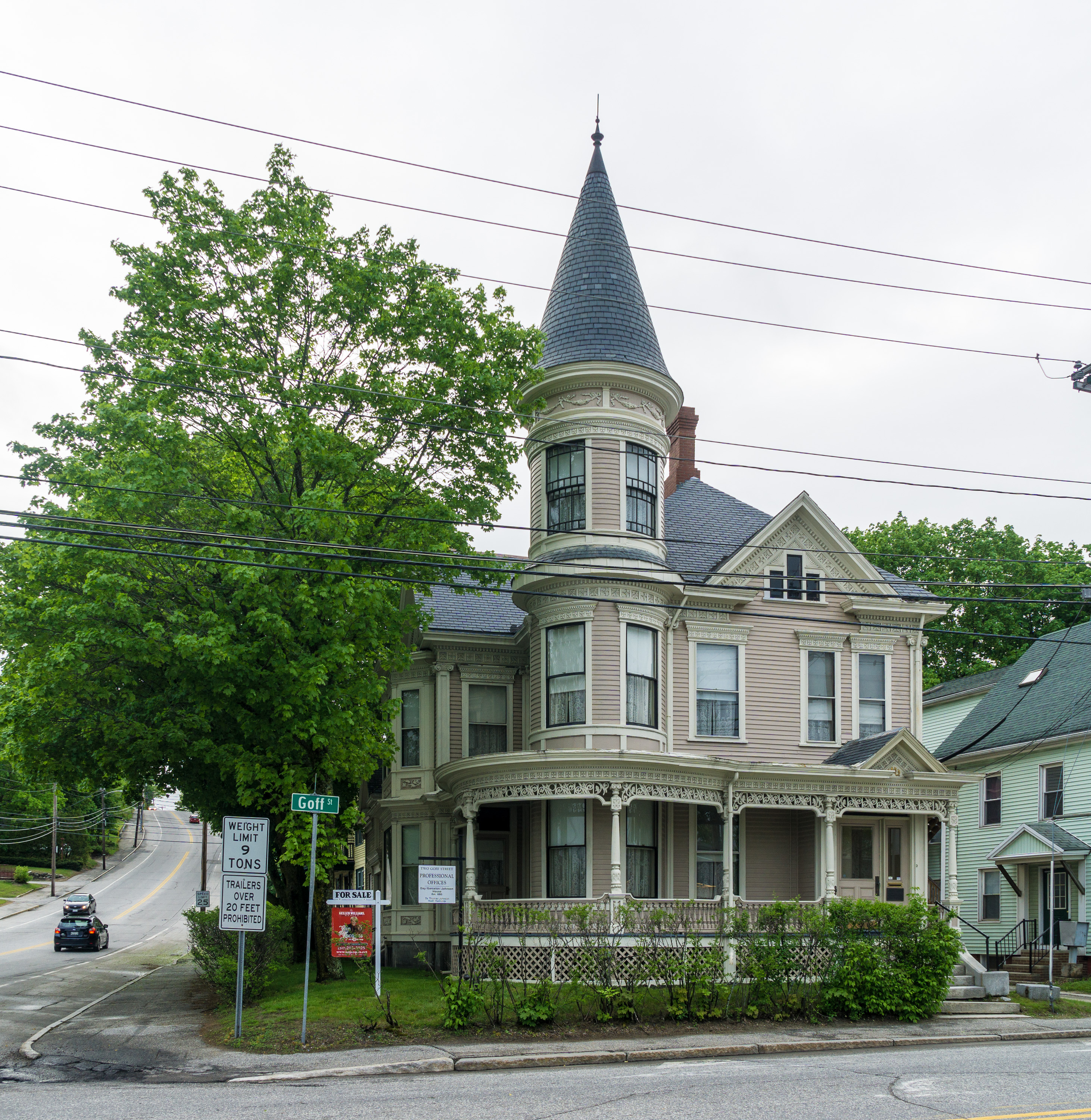

- Location within Maine Location within the United States
- Location: Auburn, Maine
- Coordinates: 44°5′54″N 70°13′57″W
- Area: less than one acre
- Built: 1895
- Architects: Gerald, Amos; Coombs, George M.
- Architectural style: Queen Anne
- NRHP reference No.: 78000155
- Added to NRHP: January 20, 1978

The Holman Day House is a historic house at 2 Goff Street in Auburn, Maine Maine where author, poet, and playwright Holman Day lived.. Built in 1895, it is one of the state's finest examples of Queen Anne architecture. It was listed on the National Register of Historic Places in 1978. Several of Day's works were staged and adapted to film.

== Description and history ==
The Day House is set at the northeast corner of Court and Goff Streets, overlooking Auburn's downtown area. It is a 2 1/2-story wood-frame structure, roughly rectangular in plan, with three-story tower at the corner and a two-story wall connecting the main house to a carriage barn. It has a hip roof, with a two-story projecting gable section to the left, and a smaller gable at the front, to the right of the tower. The tower is capped by a conical roof, with swag panels between the levels. The front-facing gable has a small Palladian window, while the left projection has a wide two-story bay window, with an oculus window in the gable. A porch extends across the front and around the side, and is ornately decorated, with a turned balustrade and posts, and a decorative trellis-like valance. The interior is similarly richly decorated in high quality materials.

The house was built in 1895 for Holman Day and his wife, Helen Rowell Gerald, by his father-in-law. At the time, Day was working primarily as a journalist for newspapers in Auburn and Lewiston. It was here that he wrote much of his poetry and fiction, building a reputation for his colorful depictions of life in Maine.

For 44 years (1975–2019) the Holman Day House had been used by (then owner) Dr. Thomas Johnson as a psychological services center providing support in the areas of health, family and school psychology. In 2019 the Holman Day House was transitioned back into the single family residence for its new owners. The authors of Maine's Maine's Historic Places refer to 2 Goff as follows " The Holman Day House is unquestionably one of the finest Queen Anne Style wooden residences in the state.This is so not only in terms of the quality of the construction, but also in terms of the architectural detail. The interior is of similar high style."

The National Park service approved the modification of the Carriage House hayloft into a hayloft library and conference center. The house has been featured on the cover of Victorian Homes.It is also featured as an example of the Queen Anne tower House in Historic Maine Homes: 300 Years of Great Homes by Christopher Glass and Brian Vanden Brink.

== See also ==
- National Register of Historic Places listings in Androscoggin County, Maine
