= Along Came Ruth =

1924 film by Edward F. Cline

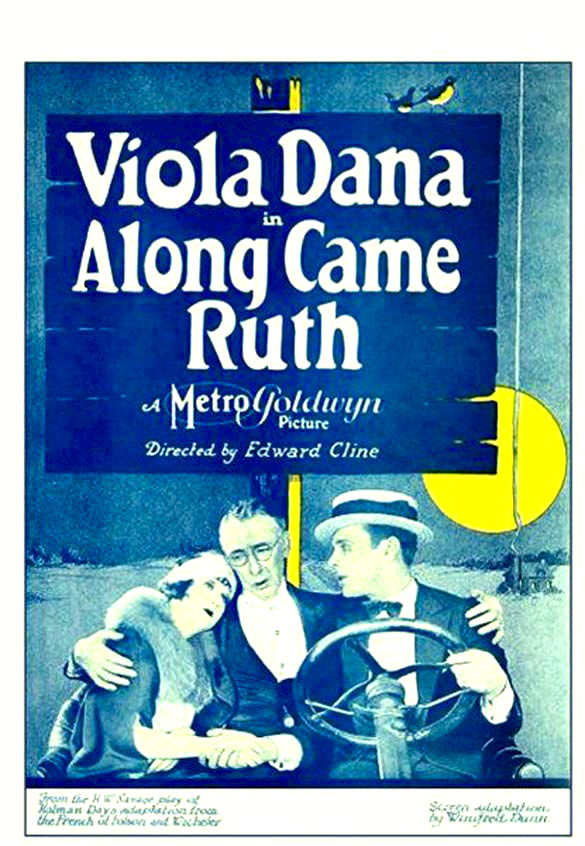
- Film poster
- Directed by: Edward F. Cline
- Written by: Winifred Dunn
- Based on: Along Came Ruth by Holman Francis Day La Demoiselle de magasin by Jean François Fonson and Fernand Wicheler
- Starring: Viola Dana
- Cinematography: John Arnold
- Distributed by: Metro-Goldwyn
- Release date: November 3, 1924
- Running time: 53 minutes (5 reels)
- Country: United States
- Language: Silent (English intertitles)

Along Came Ruth is a 1924 American comedy film starring Viola Dana. The film was directed by Edward F. Cline and written by Winifred Dunn, based on Holman Francis Day's play of the same name, itself based on the play La Demoiselle de magasin by Belgians Frantz Fonson and Fernand Wicheler. Viola Dana was one of the top stars of the newly amalgamated MGM, a lively comedian who enjoyed a long career that faded with the emergence of the talkies.

== Synopsis ==
Ruth is a small-town live-wire who takes over a furniture shop and its owner's nephew.

== Cast ==
- Viola Dana as Ruth Ambrose
- Walter Hiers as Plinty Bangs
- Tully Marshall as Israel Hubbard
- Raymond McKee as Allan Hubbard
- Victor Potel as Oscar Sims
- Gale Henry as Min (hired girl)
- DeWitt Jennings as Captain Miles Standish
- Adele Farrington as Widow Burnham
- Brenda Lane as Annabelle Burnham
- Nelson McDowell as Nathan Hodge
- Valentine Black as Young Girl (uncredited)

== Preservation ==
With no prints of Along Came Ruth located in any film archives, it is lost film.
