= Edgar Jones (actor) =

American actor and film director (1874-1958)

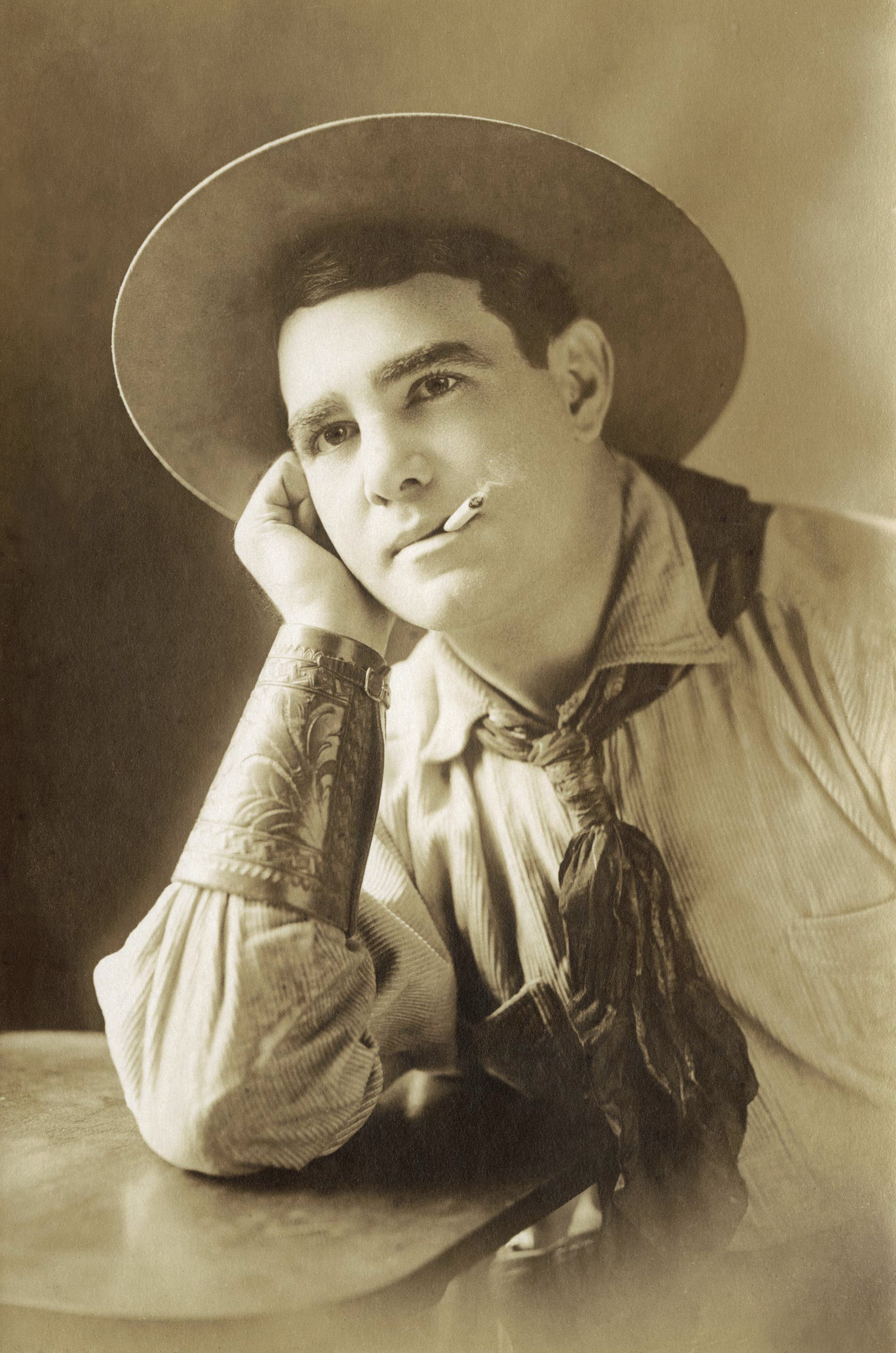
- Edgar Jones, ca. 1915
- Born: June 17, 1874; Steubenville, Ohio, U.S.
- Died: February 7, 1958 (aged 83); Los Angeles, California, U.S.
- Occupation: Actor · Producer · Director
- Spouse: Louise Huff (m. 1914, divorced)
- Children: 1

Edgar Jones (June 17, 1874 – February 7, 1958) was an American actor, producer, writer, and director of silent films. He starred in and directed the film adaptation of The Gold in the Crock. He also starred in and directed Siegmund Lubin films including Fitzhugh's Ride. He established a film production business in Augusta, Maine that produced original stories and adaptations of Holman Day novels.

== Career ==
Jones acted in touring stage productions before moving on to films. He starred with Clara Williams in A Lucky Fall.

He acted, produced, and directed Lonesome Corners. He produced, directed, and starred in a series of short films with Evelyn Brent. According to IMDb, he has more than 100 acting credits and more than 60 directing credits. Late in 1918, he formed his own production company, Edgar Jones Productions, and made films in Maine. His film work includes adaptations of Holman Day stories. The studio operated out of the former Maine Children's Home Society.

Blaine S. Viles, a former mayor of Augusta, served as the film company's president. Viles also served as state forest commissioner. The Mentor reported Holman Day films being shown to prisoners.

He married Lubin actress Louise Huff and they had a daughter together. They divorced.

Among his surviving Maine films are Border River, A Knight of the Pines, Cupid, Registered Guide, and Caught in the Rapids, all Edgar Jones Productions. Co-stars included Evelyn Brent, Edna May Sperl, Carlton Brickert, and Ben Hendricks, Jr.

Edward Lorusso collected these four films, along with two others, in a Blu-ray collection in 2023. Lorusso screened these four films at the Silent Film Festival at the Colonial Theater in Augusta, Maine on June 17, 2023. The theater is where they had all made their premieres 1919-21.

== New Discovery ==
In 2025 Edward Lorusso discovered the lost film In the River in a Library of Congress private collection. The film had been catalogued under the wrong title. It co-stars Evelyn Brent, Carlton Brickert, and Ben Hendricks, Jr. and was filmed in Augusta and West Gardiner, ME. Lorusso "re-premiered" the film in Colonial Theater in Augusta in October 2025 with live music by Jeff Rapsis. The event was filmed by documentary filmmaker Peter Flynn. The film had premiered at the Colonial Theater on August 12, 1920.

== Filmography ==
=== Actor ===
- A Lucky Fall (1912)
- Fitzhugh's Ride (1914)
- The Gold in the Crock (1915)
- On Bitter Creek (1915)
- The Trustee of the Law
- A Woman's Fool (1918)
- Wild Honey (1918)
- Wild Women (1918)
- Border River (1919) with Evelyn Brent
- A Knight of the Pines (1920) with Edna May Sperl
- In the River (1920) with Evelyn Brent
- Cupid, Registered Guide (1921) with Edna May Sperl
- Caught in the Rapids (1921) with Edna May Sperl
- The Big Punch (1921)
- Single-Handed Sam (1921)
- Lonesome Corners (1922)
- Lochinvar of the Line
- The Two-fisted Judge
- A Forest Diplomat
- Single Handed (Edgar Jones film)

=== Director ===
- The Woman Pays (1915)
- The Turmoil (1916)
- Dimples (1916)
- Lovely Mary (1916)
- The Girl Who Wouldn't Quit (1918)
- A Rich Man's Darling (1918)
- Three and a Girl (1920)

== Producer ==
- Border River (1919 film)
- The Rider of King Log (1921)
- The Timber Wolves
- A Forest Samson
