= United States Motion Picture Corporation =

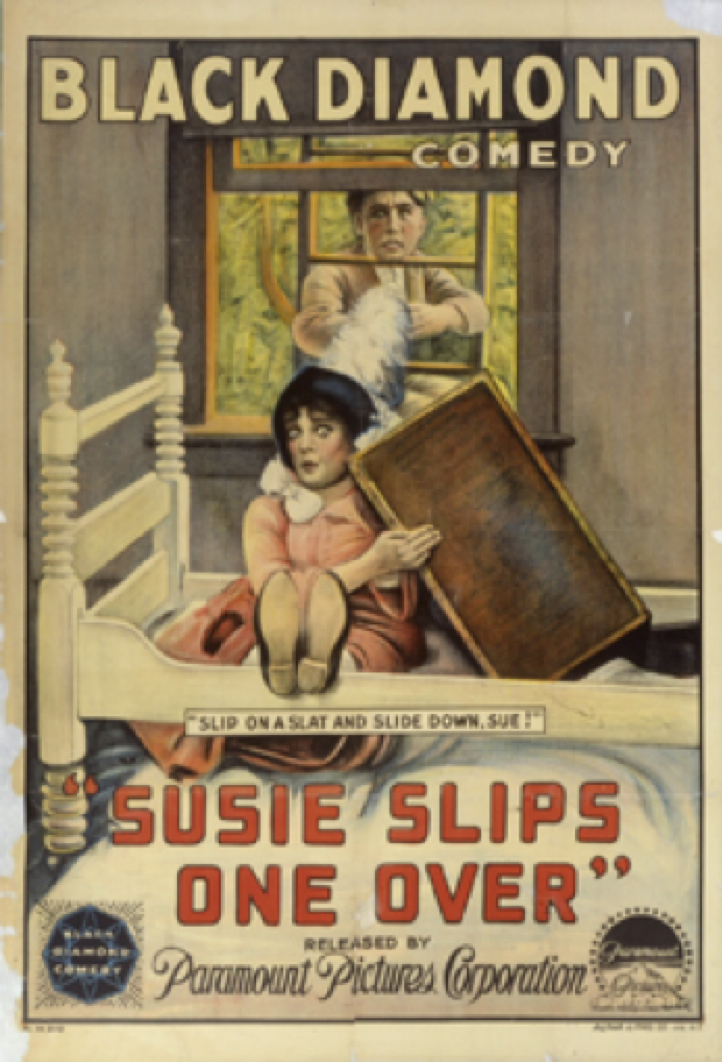
Full color release poster for the Black Diamond Comedies silent film Susie Slips One Over, which was filmed in Wilkes-Barre, Pennsylvania, and released by Paramount Pictures in 1917.

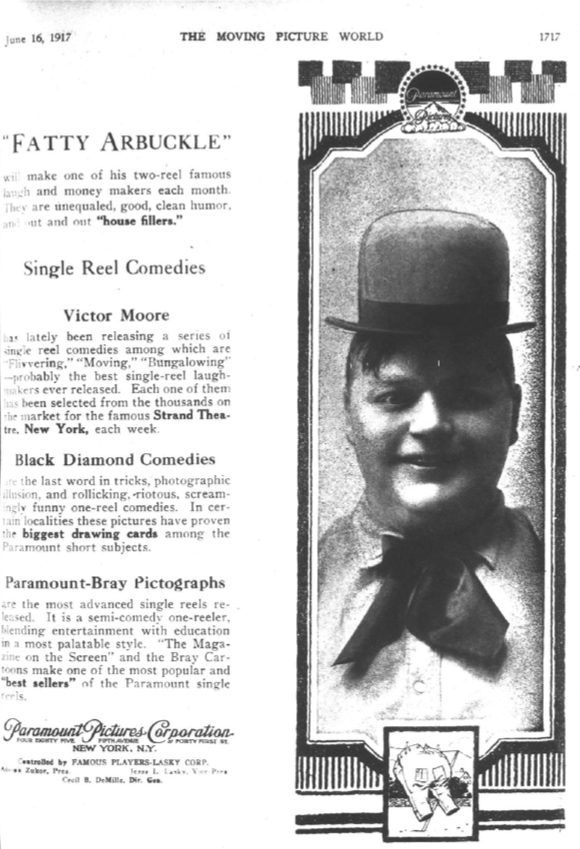
"Black Diamond Comedies," produced by the United States Motion Picture Corporation in Wilkes-Barre, Pennsylvania, were featured releases by Paramount Pictures in 1916 and 1917 alongside comedies by Fatty Arbuckle

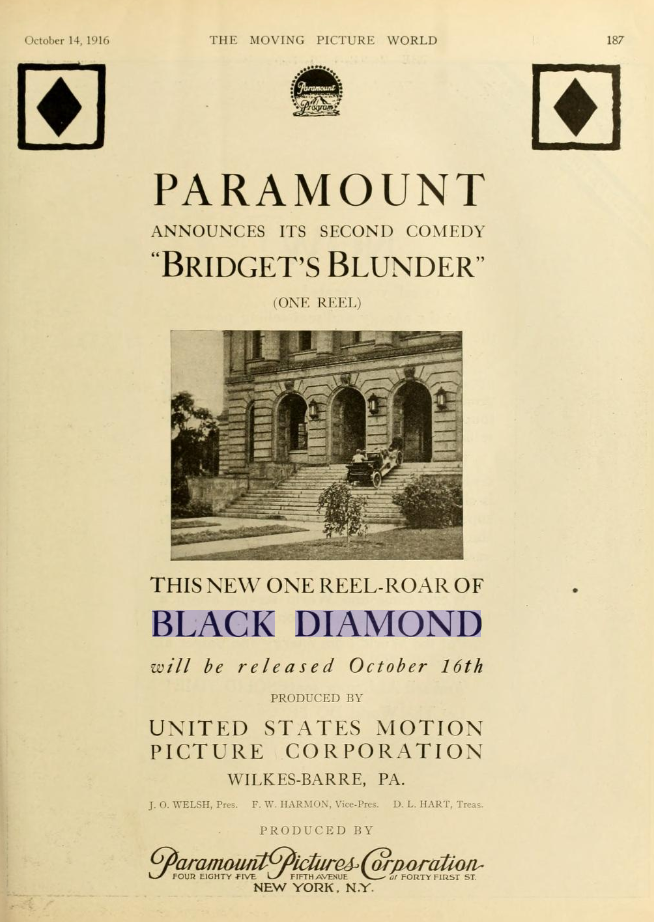
Ad for the Black Diamond silent film "Bridget's Blunder" pictures the Luzerne County Courthouse in Wilkes-Barre, Pennsylvania

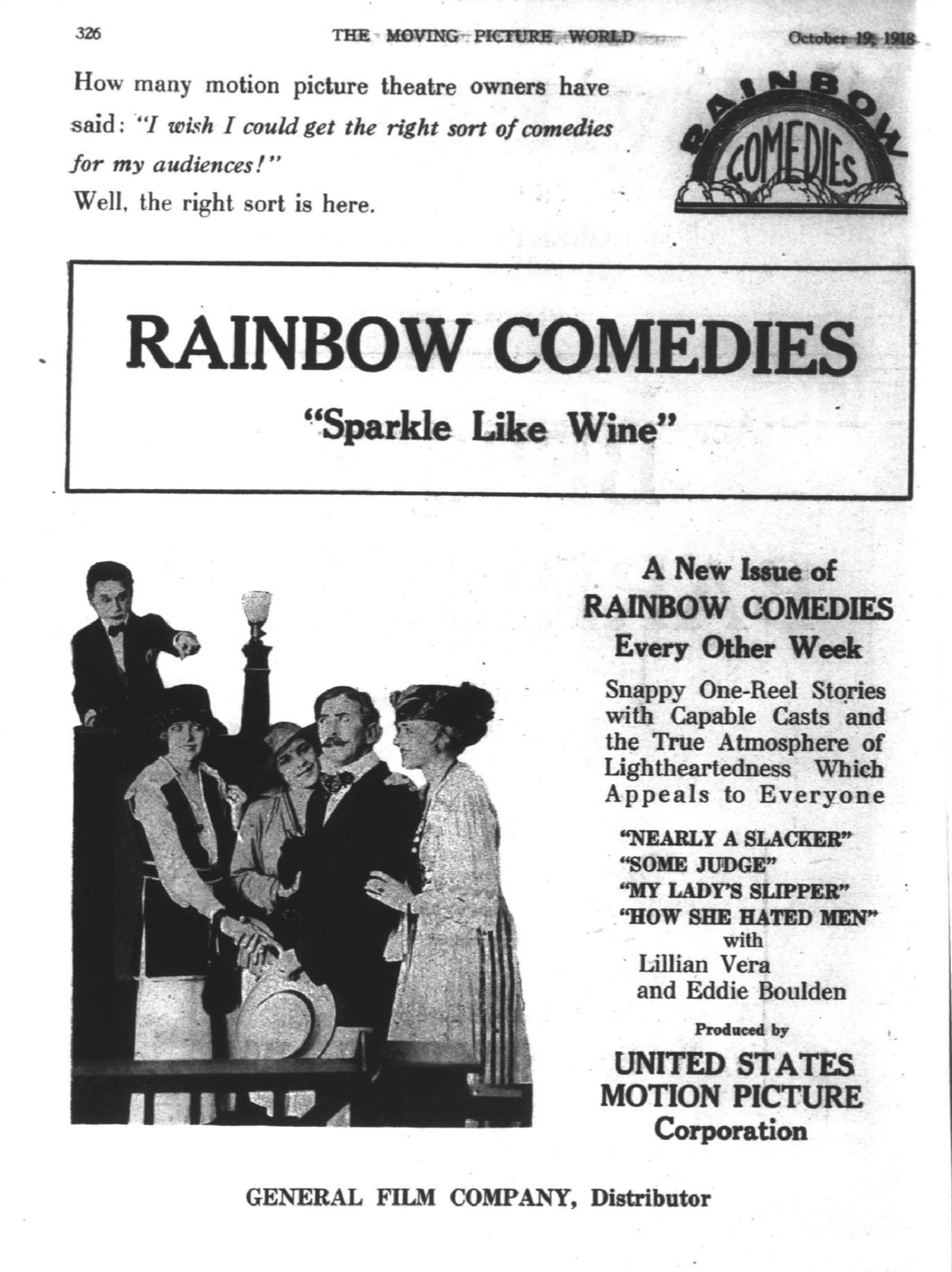
Ad for Rainbow Comedies, silent films produced by the United States Motion Picture Corporation in Wilkes-Barre, Pennsylvania, and distributed by the General Film Company

The United States Motion Picture Corporation was an early American independent film studio that produced comedic films on the East Coast. It existed during the "transitional" period before the Hollywood studio system centralized film production. The United States Motion Picture Corporation made one-reel silent films in the Wilkes-Barre, Pennsylvania, area from 1916 through 1919.

== Business history ==
Incorporated in New Jersey on March 2, 1915, The United States Motion Picture Corporation established its main office in the Savoy Building in downtown Wilkes-Barre. Its studios were located across the Susquehanna River in Forty Fort, Pennsylvania, on Slocum Street near Wyoming Avenue. The company's studio, established in Forty Fort by the summer of 1915, was a glass-and-steel building that looked somewhat like a greenhouse, designed to allow maximum light for filming.

The United States Motion Picture Corporation was founded by James O. Walsh, who was its president, Fred W. Hermann, who was the vice president, and Daniel L. Hart, who was its treasurer and is also listed as its scenario editor in one newspaper account. Hart, an award-winning playwright, would later serve as the mayor of Wilkes-Barre from 1920 until his death in 1933.

=== Black Diamond Comedies ===
Between October 2, 1916, and November 12, 1917, the United States Motion Picture Corporation produced and released twenty-seven Black Diamond Comedies. "Black Diamond" referred to anthracite coal, deposits of which had made Wilkes-Barre and the surrounding area a center of the mining industry and contributed to the region's wealth. The one-reel silent films were the first comedies distributed by Paramount Pictures, which was then based in New York. Paramount advertised these comedies widely in 1917, sometimes alongside those of Fatty Arbuckle, another Paramount comic artist. The films often followed a comic character named Susie, portrayed by USMPC's leading lady Leatrice Joy, through mishaps and blunders. The films' advertisements that appear in The Moving Picture World magazine note the use of comic special effects, with stop-action and film-speed experimentation.

After the company ended its contract with Paramount Pictures in 1917, USMPC released six additional one-reel comic films as Unique Comedies, which were distributed by the Arrow Film Company of New York. These include His Neglected Wife, which also stars Leatrice Joy and other actors who appeared in Black Diamond Comedies.

The United States Motion Picture Corporation also released Rainbow Comedies, one-reel comic films distributed by the General Film Company, in 1918 and 1919. These films often starred Lillian Vera and Eddie Boulden and were directed by Joseph A. Richmond.

== Company end ==
The United States Motion Picture Corporation stopped producing films in 1919. The company's studios in Forty Fort, Pennsylvania were subsequently used by the Serico Company, which filmed its serial A Woman in Grey in 1920.

== Selected filmography ==
=== Black Diamond Comedies ===
- Nearly A Deserter (Paramount Pictures release date October 2, 1916))
- Bridget’s Blunder (Paramount Pictures release date October 16, 1916)
- A Troublesome Trip (Paramount Pictures release date October 20, 1916)
- Villainous Pursuit (Paramount Pictures release date November 13, 1916)
- Their Counterfeit Vacation (Paramount Pictures release date November 27, 1916)
- His Ivory Dome (Paramount Pictures release date December 11, 1916)
- Their Week-end (Paramount Pictures release date December 25, 1916)
- Braving Blazes (Paramount Pictures release date January 8, 1917)
- He Did It Himself (Paramount Pictures release date January 22, 1917)
- Her Scrambled Ambition(Paramount Pictures release date February 1, 1917)
- All at Sea (Paramount Pictures release date February 6, 1917)
- Speed (Paramount Pictures release date March 5, 1917)
- The Magic Vest (Paramount Pictures release date March 19, 1917)
- The Wishbone (Paramount Pictures release date April 16,1917)
- Getting the Evidence (Paramount Pictures release date April 21, 1917)
- Her Iron Will (Paramount Pictures release date April 30, 1917)
- The Window Dresser’s Dream (Paramount Pictures release date May 14, 1917)
- Susie of the Follies (Paramount Pictures release date May 28, 1917)
- Her Fractured Voice (Paramount Pictures release date June 11, 1917)
- Auto Intoxication (Paramount Pictures release date June 25, 1917)
- Wits and Fits (Paramount Pictures release date July 9, 1917)
- The Rejuvenator (Paramount Pictures release date July 23, 1917)
- Susie the Sleepwalker (Paramount Pictures release date August 6, 1917
- Susie’s Scheme (Paramount Pictures release date September 17, 1917)
- Susie Slips One Over (Paramount Pictures release date October 7, 1917)
- Nearly a Baker (Paramount Pictures release date October 15, 1917)
- A Society Scrimmage (Paramount Pictures release date November 12, 1917)

=== Unique Comedies ===
- His Neglected Wife

=== Rainbow Comedies ===
- My Lady’s Slipper
- Nearly a Slacker
- Some Judge
- How She Hated Men
- The Camouflaged Baby
- The Pipe of Peace
- Hooverizing

== Surviving films ==
Three films produced by the United States Motion Picture Corporation are known to survive, the Black Diamond Comedies films Her Fractured Voice and Susie Slips One Over, and the Unique Comedies film His Neglected Wife.

The Prelinger Archives digitized its print of Her Fractured Voice and made it available online. The film features scenes of downtown Wilkes-Barre, including images of the original fountain in the city's Public Square.

Film prints of Susie Slips One Over are held at the UCLA Film and Television Archive. The Academy of Motion Picture Arts and Sciences’ Margaret Herrick Library in Los Angeles also holds a poster for the film. In 2012, The UCLA Film and Television Archive deposited a DVD of the film with the Luzerne County Historical Society archive in Wilkes-Barre, Pennsylvania.

Only one print of the United States Motion Pictures Corporation films released under the Unique Comedies title is known to exist, His Neglected Wife starring Leatrice Joy. The film was discovered in a vault in New Zealand and was returned to the United States for restoration at George Eastman House in 2010. The film features images of the historic Hotel Sterling in Wllkes-Barre, which was torn down in 2013. Charles Petrillo, a historian in Wilkes-Barre, sponsored this restoration and has ensured that a DVD copy of the film will be placed at the Luzerne County Historical Society archives for further study.

== Contemporary film screenings ==
On October 26, 2012, King's College and the Luzerne County Historical Society cosponsored a screening of the films Her Fractured Voice, His Neglected Wife, and Flesh and Spirit. The films were shown with live musical accompaniment at the King's College Burke Auditorium.
