= Leatrice Joy =

American actress (1893–1985)

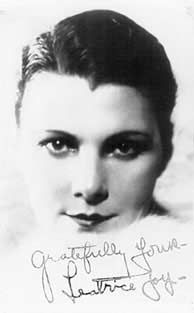
- Joy c. 1926
- Born: Leatrice Johanna Zeidler; November 7, 1893; New Orleans, Louisiana, U.S.
- Died: May 13, 1985 (aged 91); New York City, U.S.
- Resting place: Saint Savior Episcopal Churchyard
- Other name: Beatrice Joy
- Occupation: Actress
- Years active: 1915–1954
- Spouses: John Gilbert (m. 1922; div. 1925) William S. Hook (m. 1931; div. 1944) Arthur Kem Westermark (m. 1945; div. 1954)
- Children: 1

Leatrice Joy (born Leatrice Johanna Zeidler; November 7, 1893 – May 13, 1985) was an American actress most prolific during the silent film era.

== Early life ==
Joy was born in New Orleans, Louisiana, to dentist Edward Joseph Zeidler.

She attended the Convent of the Sacred Heart in New Orleans, where she had planned on becoming a nun, but left when her father was diagnosed with tuberculosis and was forced to give up his dental practice. She tried out for the New Orleans–based Nola Film Company in 1915 and was hired as an actress. Her mother disapproved of her becoming an actress, but the family needed the money, so her mother accompanied her to California, where she began working in plays and films.

Leatrice Joy (center) acting in the 1926 film The Clinging Vine

== Career ==
=== Silent films ===
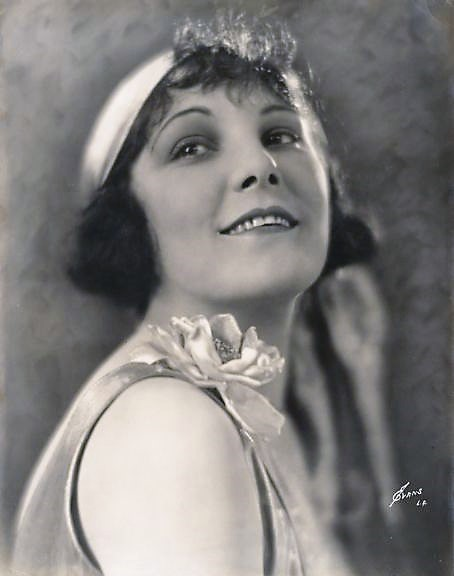
Joy, early 1920s

Joy began her acting career in stock theater companies and soon made her film debut; between April 1916 and by November 1917, she was the star of about 20 one-reel Black Diamond Comedies produced by the United States Motion Picture Corporation in Wilkes-Barre, Pennsylvania, and released nationally by Paramount Pictures. In many of these, she starred as Susie.

In late 1917 she relocated to the relatively young film colony in Hollywood, California, and began appearing in comedy shorts opposite Billy West and Oliver Hardy. Signed under contract with Samuel Goldwyn Studios, her first role for the studio was in 1917s The Pride of the Clan opposite Mary Pickford. Her career quickly gained momentum, and by 1920 she had become a highly-popular actress with the filmgoing public and was given leading-lady status opposite such performers as Wallace Beery, Conrad Nagel, Nita Naldi, and Irene Rich.

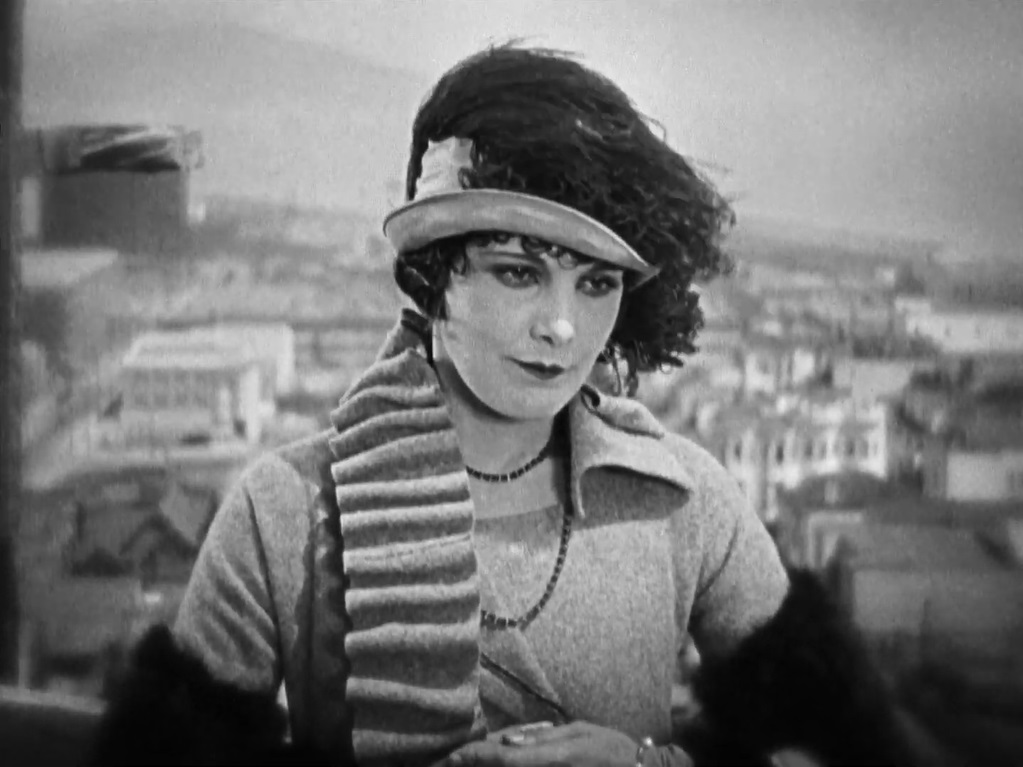
Joy as Mary Leigh in The Ten Commandments (1923)

Directors often cast Joy in the strong-willed independent woman role, and the liberated atmosphere of the Jazz Age Roaring Twenties solidified her public popularity, especially with female movie goers. Her close-cropped hair and somewhat boyish persona (she was often cast as a woman mistaken for a young man) became fashionable during the era. With her increasing popularity, Joy was sought out by Cecil B. DeMille, who signed her to Paramount Pictures in 1922, immediately casting her in that year's successful high-society drama Saturday Night opposite Conrad Nagel. Joy starred in a number of successful releases for Paramount and was heavily promoted as one of DeMille's most prominent protégées.

In 1925, against the advice of studio executives, Joy parted ways with Paramount and followed DeMille to his new film company Producers Distributing Corporation, for which she made a few moderately successful films, including Lois Weber's last silent film The Angel of Broadway in 1927. After Joy impulsively cut her hair extremely short in 1926, DeMille was publicly angry as it prevented her from portraying traditional feminine roles. The studio developed projects to promote the “Leatrice Joy bob” which she wore in Made for Love, Eve's Leaves, The Clinging Vine, For Alimony Only, and Vanity. Although she regrew her hair after styles changed in early 1927, a professional dispute ended the DeMille/Joy partnership in 1928, and she was signed with MGM. That year, she headlined MGM's second part-talkie effort, The Bellamy Trial opposite Betty Bronson and Margaret Livingston.

=== Transition to sound ===
Joy's career began to falter with the advent of talkies, possibly because her heavy Southern accent was considered unfashionable in comparison with other actresses' refined "Mid-Atlantic" diction. In 1929, she became a freelance actress without a long-term contract. In order to improve her chances of regaining her film career, she undertook a vaudeville tour from 1929 to 1931, as a training ground for returning successfully to talkies. She was particularly interested in improving her voice and learning how to better handle dialogue.

=== Retirement and later years ===
By the early 1930s, Joy was semi-retired from the motion-picture industry, but she later made several guest appearances in a few modestly-successful films, such as 1951's Love Nest, which featured a young Marilyn Monroe.

In the 1960s, Joy retired to Greenwich, Connecticut, where she lived near her daughter and son-in-law.

Joy appeared as a subject on the game show To Tell the Truth on July 1, 1963.

She was interviewed in the television documentary series Hollywood: A Celebration of the American Silent Film (1980).

== Personal life ==
Joy was married three times and had one child. On March 22, 1922, she married actor John Gilbert. They had a daughter, Leatrice, who later acted in bit parts; she was the first wife of novelist and playwright Ernest Gébler. Joy filed for divorce in August 1924, citing Gilbert's infidelity and alcoholism. Joy's second marriage was to businessman William Spencer Hook on October 22, 1931; they divorced in 1944. Joy's third and final marriage was to former actor and electrical engineer Arthur Kem Westermark. They married on March 5, 1945, in Mexico City and divorced in October 1954.

During her silent film career in the 1920s, she was Hollywood's best known Christian Scientist.

== Death ==
On May 13, 1985, Joy died from acute anemia at the High Ridge House Christian Science nursing home in Riverdale, Bronx, New York. She was interred at the Saint Savior Episcopal Churchyard in Old Greenwich, Connecticut.

For her contribution to the motion picture industry, Leatrice Joy has a star on the Hollywood Walk of Fame at 6517 Hollywood Blvd. in Hollywood, California.

== Filmography ==
Year	Title	Role	Notes
1915	His Turning Point	Mrs. Carey	
1916	The Folly of Revenge	Antonio's Daughter	
1916	The Other Man		short film
1916	A Troublesome Trip	unconfirmed role	short film
1916	Their Counterfeit Vacation	unconfirmed role	short film
1916	Auto Intoxication		short film credited as Beatrice Joy
1917	Excess Baggage	Sue Topper	short film
1917	The Pride of the Clan	Extra	uncredited
1917	A Girl's Folly	Girl	uncredited
1917	Her Scrambled Ambition	Susie	short film
1917	The Magic Vest		short film credited as Beatrice Joy
1917	Speed		short film credited as Beatrice Joy
1917	Getting the Evidence		short film credited as Beatrice Joy
1917	The Wishbone		short film credited as Beatrice Joy
1917	Her Iron Will		short film credited as Beatrice Joy
1917	Her Fractured Voice		short film credited as Beatrice Joy
1917	Susie of the Follies	Susie	short film credited as Beatrice Joy
1917	The Window Dresser's Dream		short film credited as Beatrice Joy
1917	Wits and Fits		short film credited as Beatrice Joy
1917	The Rejuvenator		short film credited as Beatrice Joy
1917	Susie the Sleepwalker	Susie	short film credited as Beatrice Joy
1917	Susie's Scheme	Susie	short film credited as Beatrice Joy
1917	Susie Slips One Over	Susie	short film credited as Beatrice Joy
1917	The Candy Kid		short film
1917	Nearly a Baker		short film credited as Beatrice Joy
1917	A Society Scrimmage		short film credited as Beatrice Joy
1917	The Slave	Susie, his daughter	short film lost film
1918	The Stranger	Susie	short film
1918	His Day Out	Joy	short film
1918	The Orderly		short film
1918	The Scholar		short film
1918	The Messenger		short film
1918	The Handy Man		short film
1918	Shackled	Undetermined role	uncredited/unconfirmed
1918	One Dollar Bid	Emily Dare	
1918	The City of Tears	Maria	lost film
1918	Wedlock	Jane Hollister	
1918	Her Man		alternative titles: The Battle Cry; The Woman Eternal
1918	Three X Gordon	Farmer's Daughter	
1919	The Man Hunter	Florence	lost film
1919	The Water Lily	undetermined role	
1920	Just a Wife	Mary Virginia Lee	
1920	The Right of Way	Rosalie Eventurail	lost film
1920	Blind Youth	Hope Martin	lost film
1920	Smiling All the Way	Alice Drydan	
1920	The Invisible Divorce	Pidgie Ryder	lost film
1920	Down Home	Nance Pelot	
1921	Bunty Pulls the Strings	Bunty Biggar	lost film
1921	A Tale of Two Worlds	Sui Sen	
1921	The Ace of Hearts	Lilith	
1921	Ladies Must Live	Barbara	lost film
1921	The Poverty of Riches	Katherine Colby	lost film
1921	Voices of the City	Georgia Rodman	lost film
1922	Saturday Night	Iris Van Suydam	
1922	The Bachelor Daddy	Sally Lockwood	lost film
1922	A Trip to Paramountown	Herself	short film
1922	Manslaughter	Lydia Thorne	
1922	The Man Who Saw Tomorrow	Rita Pring	lost film
1922	Minnie	Minnie	lost film
1923	Java Head	Taou Yuen	lost film
1923	You Can't Fool Your Wife	Edith McBride	lost film
1923	The Silent Partner	Lisa Coburn	lost film
1923	Hollywood	Cameo role	lost film
1923	The Ten Commandments	Mary Leigh	
1924	The Marriage Cheat	Helen Canfield	incomplete
1924	Triumph	Ann Land	
1924	Changing Husbands	Gwynne Evans/Eva Graham	
1925	The Dressmaker from Paris	Fifi	lost film
1925	Hell's Highroad	Judy Nichols	
1925	The Wedding Song	Beatrice Glynn	
1926	Made for Love	Joan Ainsworth	
1926	Eve's Leaves	Eve Corbin	
1926	The Clinging Vine	Antoinette B. "A.B." Allen	
1926	For Alimony Only	Mary Martin Williams	
1927	Girl in the Rain		
1927	Nobody's Widow	Roxanna Smith	
1927	Vanity	Barbara Fiske	
1927	The Angel of Broadway	Babe Scott	lost film
1928	The Blue Danube	Marguerite	
1928	Man-Made Women	Nan Payson	
1928	Show People	Herself - at Banquet	uncredited
1928	Tropic Madness	Juanita	Lost film, except for 14 minutes discovered in 2022
1929	The Bellamy Trial	Sue Ives	
1929	Strong Boy	Mary McGregor	lost film
1929	A Most Immoral Lady	Laura Sergeant	
1930	The Love Trader	Martha Adams	
1939	First Love	Grace Shute Clinton	alternative title: Cinderella
1940	The Old Swimmin' Hole	Mrs. Julie Carter	
1949	Red Stallion in the Rockies	Martha Simpson	
1949	Air Hostess	Celia Hansen	
1951	Love Nest	Eadie Gaynor	
1953-1954	Westinghouse Studio One	various roles	2 episodes
1954	Robert Montgomery Presents		episode: "The Steady Man"
