= Holman Day =

American poet (1865–1935)

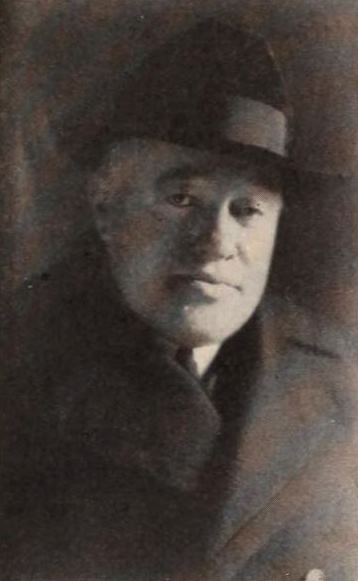
- Holman Day in 1921
- Born: Holman Francis Day; November 6, 1865; Vassalboro, Maine, US
- Died: February 19, 1935 (aged 69); Mill Valley, California, US
- Occupation: Author

Holman Francis Day (November 6, 1865 – February 19, 1935) was an American author, born at Vassalboro, Maine. The Holman Day House, his home in Auburn, Maine, is listed on the National Register of Historic Places. His book The Rider of the King Log was adapted into the 1921 film The Rider of the King Log. His play Along Came Ruth was adapted into the 1924 film Along Came Ruth.

== Personal life ==
Day married Helen Gerald, the only daughter of railroad engineer Amos F. Gerald and Caroline W. Rowell. She died in 1902 at the age of 32, and was interred in Maplewood Cemetery in her father's home town of Fairfield, Maine. Day died at his home in Mill Valley, California on February 19, 1935, and was buried in Nichols Cemetery in his hometown of Vassalboro, Maine.

== Career ==
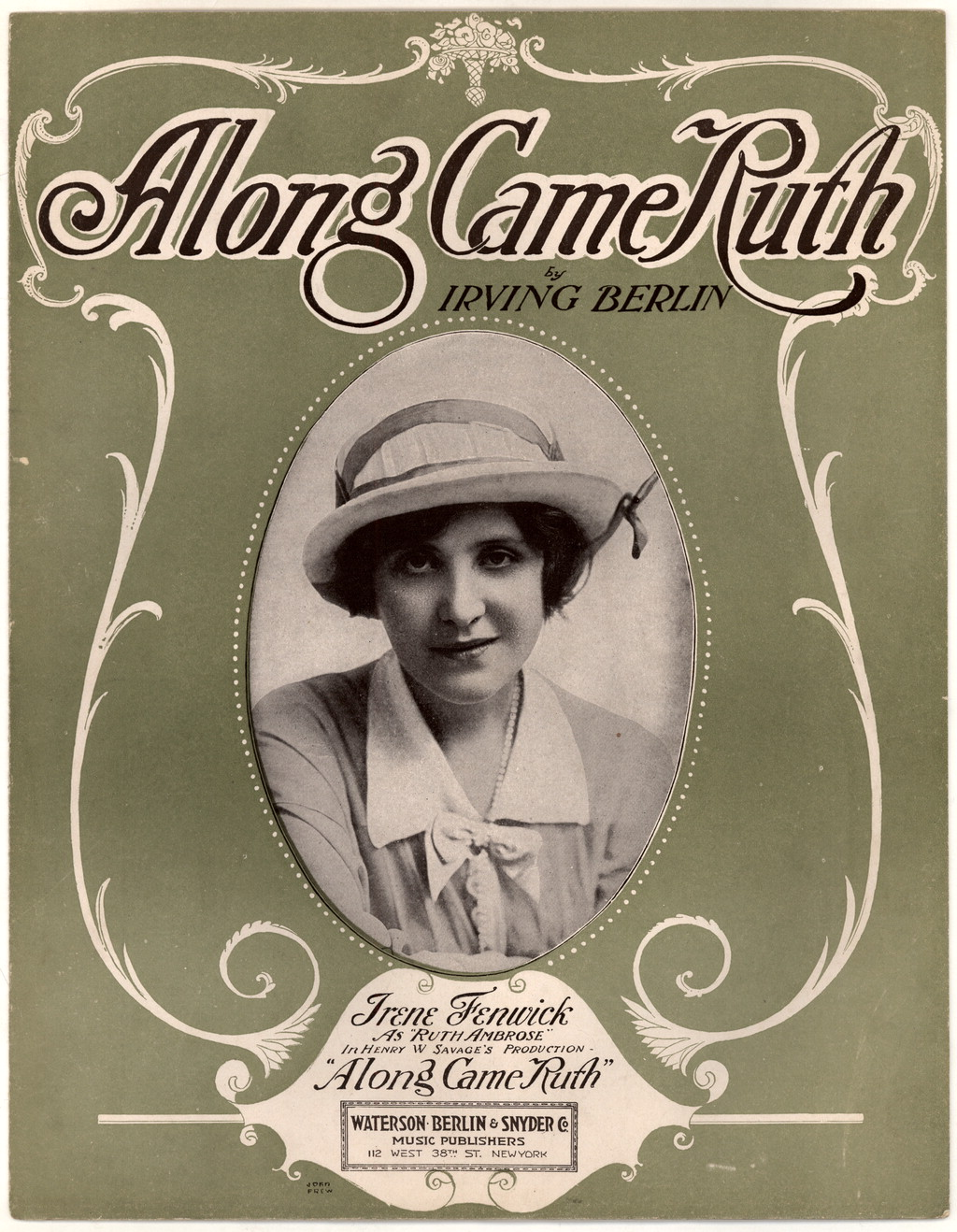
Sheet music for Irving Berlin's song "Along Came Ruth", from Day's 1914 play starring Irene Fenwick

He graduated from Colby College (class of 1887). In 1889-90 he was managing editor of the publications of the Union Publishing Company in Bangor, Maine. He was also editor and proprietor of the Gazette in Dexter, Maine, a special writer for the Journal in Lewiston, Maine, representative of the Boston Herald, and managing editor of the Daily Sun in Lewiston. From 1901 until 1904 he was military secretary to Gov. John F. Hill of Maine.

He came to Carmel-by-the-Sea, California in the 1920s.

The main poet of Maine and no small man in Carmel! Much too busy to do much visiting but when he does it's a tonic to listen to him. His many novels contain adventures in the big woods and sturdy outdoor life. He says the first 'pome' he ever wrote for the Lewiston Journal brought a libel suit on the paper and put a blackhand value on his three stanza gem to the extent of a sum never received by the great Longfellow in his palmiest days. "Started right out as a high priced poet," he says.

— Carmel Pine Cone

== Writings ==
- Up in Maine (1901), verse
- Kin O'Ktaadn (1904)
- The Bye-Bye Chair (1904), excerpts from this poem were used by Congressman James Thomas Heflin in his May 1914 Mother's Day speech
- Squire Phin (1905; 1913), a novel dramatized as The Circus Man and produced in Chicago in 1909
- Rainy Day Railroad War (1906; 1913)
- The Eagle Badge (1908)
- King Spruce (1908)
- The Ramrodders (1910)
- The Skipper and the Skipped (1911)
- The Red Lane: A Romance of the Border (1912)
- The Landloper (1915)
- Along Came Ruth play produced in New York, (1914)
- Blow the Man Down (1916)
- Where Your Treasure Is (1917)
- Pine Tree Ballads (1917)
- Kavanagh's Clare (1917)
- The Rider of the King Log (1919)
- When Egypt Went Broke (1920)
- All Wool Morrison (1921)
- Joan of Arc of the North Woods (1922)
- The Ship of Joy (1931) Schwabacher-Frey Company: San Francisco

== Filmography ==
- The Rider of the King Log (1921)
- The Black Ace (1921), starring Edgar Jones and Edna May Sperl
- Along Came Ruth (1924)
