= List of adventure films of the 1920s =

A list of adventure films released in the 1920s.

== 1920 ==
Title	Director	Cast	Country	Subgenre/Notes
The Best of Luck	Ray C. Smallwood	Jack Holt, Kathryn Adams	United States	Sea adventure
Caravan of Death	Josef Stein	Carl de Vogt	Germany	
The Deerslayer and Chingachgook	Arthur Wellin	Emil Mamelok, Béla Lugosi	Germany	Western
The Dragon's Net	Henry MacRae	Marie Walcamp, Harland Tucker, Otto Lederer	United States	Serial
Huckleberry Finn	William Desmond Taylor	Lewis Sargent, George H. Reed	United States	
Indian Revenge	Georg Jacoby, Leo Lasko	Harry Liedtke, Mady Christians	Germany	
The Last Of The Mohicans	Maurice Tourneur, Clarence Brown	Wallace Beery, Barbara Bedford, Alan Roscoe, Lillian Hall	United States	Western
The Leopard Woman	Wesley Ruggles	Louise Glaum, House Peters	United States	
The Lost City	E. A. Martin	Juanita Hansen, George Chesebro	United States	Serial
The Mark of Zorro	Fred Niblo	Douglas Fairbanks	United States	Swashbuckler, Western
On the Brink of Paradise	Josef Stein	Carl de Vogt	Germany	
Pirate Gold	George B. Seitz	George B. Seitz, Marguerite Courtot	United States	Serial
The Revenge of Tarzan	Harry Revier, George M. Merrick	Gene Pollar, Karla Schramm	United States	
The Sea Wolf	George Melford	Noah Beery, Mabel Julienne Scott, Tom Forman	United States	Sea adventure
The Son of Tarzan	Arthur J. Flaven, Harry Revier	Kamuela C. Searle, P. Dempsey Tabler, Karla Schramm	United States	Serial
Spiders, Part 2: The Diamond Ship	Fritz Lang	Lil Dagover, Carl de Vogt, Georg John, Ressel Orla	Germany	Serial, spies
Terror Island	James Cruze	Harry Houdini, Jack Brammall, Lila Lee, Wilton Taylor	United States	Tropical island, submarine
Treasure Island	Maurice Tourneur	Charles Ogle, Lon Chaney, Shirley Mason	United States	Pirate film

== 1921 ==
Title	Director	Cast	Country	Subgenre/Notes
The Adventures of Tarzan	Robert F. Hill, Scott Sidney	Elmo Lincoln, Louise Lorraine	United States	Serial
L'Atlantide	Jacques Feyder	Jean Angelo, Stacia Napierkowska, Georges Melchior	France	Fantasy adventure
The Big Adventure	B. Reeves Eason	B. Reeves Eason Jr., Fred Herzog, Gertrude Olmstead, Molly Shafer, Lee Shumway	United States	Adventure
The Devil Worshippers	Muhsin Ertuğrul	Carl de Vogt	Germany	
Do or Die	J. P. McGowan	Eddie Polo	United States	Serial
A Gentleman of France	Maurice Elvey	Eille Norwood, Madge Stuart	United Kingdom	
The Indian Tomb	Joe May	Lil Dagover, Conrad Veidt, Lya De Putti, Paul Richter, Olaf Fønss	Germany	Fantasy adventure
The Lord of the Beasts	Ernst Wendt	Carl de Vogt	Germany	
Miracles of the Jungle	E. A. Martin, James Conway	Ben Hagerty, Wilbur Higby, Al Ferguson	United States	Serial
Peter Voss, Thief of Millions	Georg Jacoby	Harry Liedtke, Georg Alexander, Mady Christians	Germany	Serial
Il ponte dei sospiri	Domenico Gaido	Luciano Albertini	Italy	
The Sky Ranger	George B. Seitz	George B. Seitz, June Caprice	United States	Serial
The Three Musketeers	Fred Niblo	Douglas Fairbanks	United States	Swashbuckler
Les Trois Mousquetaires	Henri Diamant-Berger	Aimé Simon-Girard, Henri Rollan	France	Serial
The Wildcat	Ernst Lubitsch	Pola Negri	Germany	Adventure comedy

== 1922 ==
Title	Director	Cast	Country	Subgenre/Notes
The Adventures of Robinson Crusoe	Robert F. Hill	Harry Myers, Noble Johnson, Gertrude Olmstead	United States	Serial
Alone in the Jungle	Ernst Wendt	Carl de Vogt	Germany	
Captain Kidd	Burton L. King, J. P. McGowan	Eddie Polo	United States	Serial, pirate film
A Dangerous Adventure	Jack L. Warner, Sam Warner	Grace Darmond	United States	Serial
Dick Turpin's Ride to York	Maurice Elvey	Matheson Lang	United Kingdom	
The Dictator	James Cruze	Wallace Reid, Lila Lee	United States	Adventure comedy
Hurricane's Gal	Allen Holubar	Dorothy Phillips, Robert Ellis, Wallace Beery	United States	Sea adventure
The Jungle Goddess	James Conway	Elinor Field, Truman Van Dyke	United States	Serial
The Man from Beyond	Burton L. King	Harry Houdini, Arthur Maude, Albert Tavernier, Erwin Connelly	United States	
The Man Unconquerable	Joseph Henabery	Jack Holt, Sylvia Breamer	United States	Sea adventure
Masters of the Sea	Alexander Korda	Victor Varconi, María Corda	Austria	Sea adventure
Moran of the Lady Letty	George Melford	Dorothy Dalton, Rudolph Valentino	United States	Sea adventure
Nanook of the North	Robert J. Flaherty	Allakariallak (Nanook), Nyla, Cunayou	United States	Arctic adventure, cinéma vérité
On the High Seas	Irvin Willat	Dorothy Dalton, Jack Holt	United States	Sea adventure, romantic adventure
Perils of the Yukon	Jay Marchant, J. P. McGowan	William Desmond	United States	Serial
The Prisoner of Zenda	Rex Ingram	Lewis Stone, Ramon Novarro, Alice Terry, Robert Edeson	United States	Swashbuckler
Robin Hood	Allan Dwan	Douglas Fairbanks, Wallace Beery, Sam de Grasse	United States	Swashbuckler, romantic adventure
Shadows of the Sea	Alan Crosland	Doris Kenyon, Conway Tearle	United States	Sea adventure
The Three Must-Get-Theres	Max Linder	Max Linder	United States	Adventure comedy
To Have and to Hold	George Fitzmaurice	Betty Compson, Bert Lytell	United States	
Under Two Flags	Tod Browning	Priscilla Dean, James Kirkwood	United States	
The White Desert	Ernst Wendt	Carl de Vogt	Germany	Arctic adventure
With Stanley in Africa	William James Craft, Edward A. Kull	George Walsh, Louise Lorraine	United States	Serial
The Woman Who Believed	Jack Harvey	Walter Miller, Anna Luther	United States	

== 1923 ==
Title	Director	Cast	Country	Subgenre/Notes
Around the World in Eighteen Days	Robert F. Hill, B. Reeves Eason	William Desmond	United States	Serial
Beasts of Paradise	William James Craft	William Desmond, Eileen Sedgwick	United States	Serial
Buridan, le héros de la tour de Nesle	Pierre Marodon	Robert Valberg	France	Serial
The Call of the Wild	Fred Jackman	Jack Mulhall, Walter Long, Sidney D'Albrook	United States	
The Dangerous Maid	Victor Heerman	Constance Talmadge	United States	
The Fighting Blade	John S. Robertson	Richard Barthelmess	United States	
The Fighting Skipper	Francis Ford	Jack Perrin, Peggy O'Day, Francis Ford	United States	Serial, sea adventure
The Green Goddess	Sidney Olcott	George Arliss, Alice Joyce, David Powell	United States	
I Will Repay	Henry Kolker	Holmes Herbert, Flora Le Breton, Pedro de Cordoba	United Kingdom	
The Isle of Lost Ships	Maurice Tourneur	Anna Q. Nilsson, Milton Sills, Frank Campeau	United States	Sea adventure
Lost and Found on a South Sea Island	Raoul Walsh	House Peters, Pauline Starke, Antonio Moreno	United States	Sea adventure
The Man in the Iron Mask	Max Glass	Vladimir Gajdarov, Albert Bassermann	Germany	
North of Hudson Bay	John Ford	Tom Mix	United States	
Scaramouche	Rex Ingram	Ramon Novarro, Lewis Stone, Alice Terry, Lloyd Ingraham	United States	Swashbuckler
The Spoilers	Lambert Hillyer	Milton Sills, Anna Q. Nilsson, Noah Beery Sr.	United States	
The Tiger's Claw	Joseph Henabery	Jack Holt, Eva Novak, Aileen Pringle	United States	Romantic adventure
Through Fire and Water	Thomas Bentley	Clive Brook, Flora Le Breton, Lawford Davidson	United Kingdom	Sea adventure
Vengeance of the Deep	Barry Barringer	Ralph Lewis, Virginia Brown Faire, Richard Arlen	United States	Sea adventure
Why Worry?	Fred C. Newmeyer, Sam Taylor	Harold Lloyd	United States	Adventure comedy

== 1924 ==
Title	Director	Cast	Country	Subgenre/Notes
Aelita: Queen Of Mars	Yakov Protazanov	Nikolai Batalov, Varvara Massalitinova, Yuliya Solntseva, Mikhail Zharov	Russia	Science fiction
Captain Blood	David Smith	J. Warren Kerrigan, Jean Paige	United States	Swashbuckler, pirate film
The Chechahcos	Lewis H. Moomaw	Gladys Johnson, William Dills, Albert Van Antwerp	United States	
Claude Duval	George A. Cooper	Nigel Barrie, Fay Compton	United Kingdom	
The Fortieth Door	George B. Seitz	Allene Ray, Bruce Gordon, Anna May Wong	United States	Serial, romantic adventure
Lure of the Yukon	Norman Dawn	Eva Novak, Spottiswoode Aitken, Buddy Roosevelt, Arthur Jasmine	United States	
Mandrin	Henri Fescourt	Romuald Joubé	France	
Le Miracle des loups	Raymond Bernard	Romuald Joubé, Vanni Marcoux, Charles Dullin	France	
Monsieur Beaucaire	Sidney Olcott	Rudolph Valentino, Bebe Daniels	United States	
Mountain of Destiny	Arnold Fanck	Hannes Schneider, Luis Trenker	Germany	Mountaineering adventure
The Navigator	Buster Keaton	Buster Keaton, Frederick Vroom, Kathryn McGuire	United States	Desert island, ship board adventure
Die Nibelungen	Fritz Lang	Paul Richter, Margarete Schön, Hanna Ralph, Rudolf Klein-Rogge	Germany	Fantasy adventure
The Sea Hawk	Frank Lloyd	Milton Sills, Enid Bennett	United States	Swashbuckler, pirate film
The Sword of Valor	Duke Worne	Snowy Baker, Dorothy Revier	United States	
The Thief of Bagdad	Raoul Walsh	Douglas Fairbanks, Snitz Edwards, Julanne Johnston, Anna May Wong	United States	Fantasy adventure

== 1925 ==
Title	Director	Cast	Country	Subgenre/Notes
Adventure	Victor Fleming	Tom Moore, Pauline Starke, Wallace Beery	United States	
Ben-Hur: A Tale of the Christ	Fred Niblo	Ramon Novarro, Francis X. Bushman, May McAvoy, Betty Bronson	United States	
Le Bossu	Jean Kemm	Gaston Jacquet, Claude France, Marcel Vibert	France	
Dick Turpin	John G. Blystone	Tom Mix	United States	
Don Q, Son of Zorro	Donald Crisp	Douglas Fairbanks, Mary Astor, Jack McDonald	United States	Swashbuckler
The Eagle	Clarence Brown	Rudolph Valentino, Vilma Bánky, Louise Dresser	United States	
Fanfan la Tulipe	René Leprince	Aimé Simon-Girard	France	Serial
Flight Around the World	Willi Wolff	Ellen Richter, Reinhold Schünzel	Germany	Serial
Forbidden Cargo	Tom Buckingham	Evelyn Brent, Robert Ellis, Boris Karloff	United States	Sea adventure
Goetz von Berlichingen of the Iron Hand	Hubert Moest	Eugen Klöpfer, Paul Hartmann, Gertrude Welcker, Erna Morena	Germany	
The Gold Rush	Charles Chaplin	Charles Chaplin, Georgia Hale, Mack Swain, Tom Murray	United States	Adventure comedy, western
Grass	Merian C. Cooper, Ernest B. Schoedsack	Merian C. Cooper, Ernest B. Schoedsack, Marguerite Harrison, Haidar Khan	United States	Documentary
El Húsar de la Muerte	Pedro Sienna	Pedro Sienna	Chile	
Lady Robinhood	Ralph Ince	Evelyn Brent, Robert Ellis, Boris Karloff	United States	
The Lady Who Lied	Edwin Carewe	Lewis Stone, Virginia Valli, Nita Naldi	United States	
Living Buddhas	Paul Wegener	Paul Wegener, Asta Nielsen, Gregori Chmara	Germany	
The Lost World	Harry Hoyt, Lewis Stone	Bessie Love, Lloyd Hughes, Wallace Beery	United States	Fantasy adventure
Perils of the Wild	Francis Ford	Joe Bonomo, Margaret Quimby	United States	Serial
Peter the Pirate	Arthur Robison	Paul Richter, Aud Egede-Nissen, Rudolf Klein-Rogge	Germany	
The Revenge of the Pharaohs	Hans Theyer	Suzy Vernon, Gustav Diessl	Austria	
Satan's Sister	George Pearson	Betty Balfour	United Kingdom	Sea adventure
She	Leander de Cordova, G. B. Samuelson	Betty Blythe, Carlyle Blackwell, Heinrich George	United Kingdom; Germany	Fantasy adventure
Surcouf	Luitz-Morat	Jean Angelo	France	Serial, pirate film
The Winding Stair	John Griffith Wray	Edmund Lowe, Alma Rubens, Warner Oland	United States	
Zigano	Harry Piel, Gérard Bourgeois	Harry Piel, Denise Legeay, Dary Holm, Fritz Greiner	Germany	

== 1926 ==
Title	Director	Cast	Country	Subgenre/Notes
The Adventures of Prince Achmed	Lotte Reiniger		Germany	Animated film, fantasy adventure
Bardelys the Magnificent	King Vidor	John Gilbert, Eleanor Boardman, Roy D'Arcy	United States	
Beau Geste	Herbert Brenon	Ronald Colman, Neil Hamilton, Ralph Forbes, Alice Joyce	United States	War adventure
Black Paradise	Roy William Neill	Madge Bellamy, Leslie Fenton, Edmund Lowe	United States	Sea adventure
The Black Pirate	Albert Parker	Douglas Fairbanks, Billie Dove, Tempe Pigott	United States	Swashbuckler, pirate film
Breed of the Sea	Ralph Ince	Margaret Livingston, Ralph Ince, Dorothy Dunbar	United States	Sea adventure
Cruise of the Jasper B	James W. Horne	Rod La Rocque, Mildred Harris, Snitz Edwards	United States	Swashbuckler, adventure comedy
Danger Quest	Harry Joe Brown	Reed Howes, Ethel Shannon	United States	
Don Juan	Alan Crosland	John Barrymore, Jane Winton, Warner Oland, Myrna Loy, Mary Astor	United States	
The Eagle of the Sea	Frank Lloyd	Florence Vidor, Ricardo Cortez	United States	Pirate film
Forbidden Cargoes	Fred LeRoy Granville	Peggy Hyland, Clifford McLaglen, James Lindsay	United Kingdom	
Holy Mountain	Arnold Fanck	Leni Riefenstahl, Luis Trenker	Germany	Mountaineering adventure
The Love of the Bajadere	Géza von Bolváry	Ellen Kürti	Germany	
Maciste in the Lion's Cage	Guido Brignone	Bartolomeo Pagano	Italy	
Michel Strogoff	Victor Tourjansky	Ivan Mosjoukine	France	
Old Ironsides	James Cruze	Wallace Beery, Esther Ralston, George Bancroft, Charles Farrell, Johnnie Walker	United States	Sea adventure
The Sea Beast	Millard Webb	John Barrymore, Dolores Costello	United States	Sea adventure
Sea Horses	Allan Dwan	Jack Holt, Florence Vidor, William Powell, George Bancroft	United States	Sea adventure
The Sea Wolf	Ralph Ince	Ralph Ince, Claire Adams, Theodore von Eltz	United States	Sea adventure
Volcano!	William K. Howard	Bebe Daniels, Ricardo Cortez, Wallace Beery	United States	

== 1927 ==
Title	Director	Cast	Country	Subgenre/Notes
The Beloved Rogue	Alan Crosland	John Barrymore, Conrad Veidt, Marceline Day	United States	
The Blood Ship	George B. Seitz	Hobart Bosworth, Jacqueline Logan, Richard Arlen	United States	Sea adventure
Chang	Merian C. Cooper, Ernest B. Schoedsack	Kru, Chantui, Nah	United States	Documentary
The Devil Dancer	Fred Niblo	Gilda Gray, Clive Brook	United States	
The Fighting Eagle	Donald Crisp	Rod La Rocque, Phyllis Haver, Sam De Grasse	United States	
The Gaucho	F. Richard Jones	Douglas Fairbanks, Lupe Vélez, Gustav von Seyffertitz	United States	
Isle of Sunken Gold	Harry S. Webb	Anita Stewart	United States	Serial, sea adventure
King of the Jungle	Webster Cullison	Elmo Lincoln, Sally Long	United States	Serial
The King's Highway	Sinclair Hill	Matheson Lang, Joan Lockton, James Carew	United Kingdom	
The Loves of Casanova	Alexandre Volkoff	Ivan Mosjoukine, Diana Karenne, Rudolf Klein-Rogge	France	
Nameless Woman	Georg Jacoby	Elga Brink, Jack Trevor, Georg Alexander	Germany	
Perils of the Jungle	Ray Taylor, Jack Nelson	Eugenia Gilbert, Frank Merrill, Bobby Nelson	United States	Serial
Rinaldo Rinaldini	Max Obal, Rudolf Dworsky	Luciano Albertini	Germany	
The Road to Romance	John S. Robertson	Ramon Novarro, Marceline Day	United States	Pirate film
Senorita	Clarence G. Badger	Bebe Daniels, James Hall, William Powell	United States	
Shanghai Bound	Luther Reed	Richard Dix, Mary Brian	United States	Sea adventure
Tarzan and the Golden Lion	J. P. McGowan	James Pierce, Edna Murphy	United States	Jungle adventure
Two Arabian Knights	Lewis Milestone	William Boyd, Mary Astor, Louis Wolheim	United States	
The Warning	George B. Seitz	Jack Holt, Dorothy Revier	United States	

== 1928 ==
Title	Director	Cast	Country	Subgenre/Notes
Balaclava	Maurice Elvey, Milton Rosmer	Cyril McLaglen, Benita Hume	United Kingdom	
Beau Sabreur	John S. Waters	Gary Cooper, Evelyn Brent, William Powell, Noah Beery	United States	Adventure drama
The Charge of the Gauchos	Albert H. Kelley	Francis X. Bushman, Jacqueline Logan	United States; Argentina	
The Cossacks	George W. Hill, Clarence Brown	John Gilbert, Renée Adorée, Ernest Torrence, Nils Asther	United States	
The First Kiss	Rowland V. Lee	Gary Cooper, Fay Wray	United States	Sea adventure
The Gateway of the Moon	John Griffith Wray	Dolores del Río, Walter Pidgeon	United States	
The Great Adventuress	Robert Wiene	Lili Damita, Georg Alexander, Fred Solm, Félix de Pomés	Germany	
Haunted Island	Robert F. Hill	Jack Dougherty, Helen Foster, Al Ferguson	United States	Serial
Modern Pirates	Manfred Noa	Jack Trevor	Germany	Sea adventure
The Prince of Rogues	Curtis Bernhardt	Hans Stüwe	Germany	
Scarlet Seas	John Francis Dillon	Richard Barthelmess, Betty Compson, Loretta Young	United States	Sea adventure
Secrets of the Orient	Alexandre Volkoff	Iván Petrovich, Gaston Modot	Germany; France	
Struggle for the Matterhorn	Mario Bonnard, Nunzio Malasomma	Luis Trenker	Germany; Switzerland	
Tarzan the Mighty	Jack Nelson, Ray Taylor	Frank Merrill, Natalie Kingston	United States	Serial
The Trail of '98	Clarence Brown	Dolores del Río, Ralph Forbes, Harry Carey, Karl Dane	United States	Adventure drama
The Triumph of the Scarlet Pimpernel	T. Hayes Hunter	Matheson Lang, Juliette Compton	United States	
Two Lovers	Fred Niblo	Ronald Colman, Vilma Bánky, Noah Beery	United States	
The Viking	Roy William Neill	Donald Crisp, Pauline Starke, LeRoy Mason	United States	Adventure drama
West of Zanzibar	Tod Browning	Lon Chaney, Lionel Barrymore, Mary Nolan, Warner Baxter	United States	
White Shadows in the South Seas	W. S. Van Dyke, Robert Flaherty	Monte Blue, Raquel Torres	United States	
Won in the Clouds	Bruce M. Mitchell	Al Wilson, Helen Foster, Frank Rice	United States	

== 1929 ==
Title	Director	Cast	Country	Subgenre/Notes
The Call of the North	Nunzio Malasomma, Mario Bonnard	Luis Trenker	Germany	Arctic adventure
Captain Fracasse	Alberto Cavalcanti	Pierre Blanchar, Lien Deyers, Charles Boyer	France	
The Delightful Rogue	Leslie Pearce	Rod La Rocque	United States	Sea adventure
The Desert Song	Roy Del Ruth	John Boles, Louise Fazenda, Myrna Loy	United States	Musical
Emerald of the East	Jean de Kuharski	Joshua Kean, Mary Odette, Jean de Kuharski	United Kingdom	
The Four Feathers	Merian C. Cooper	Richard Arlen, Fay Wray, Clive Brook, William Powell, Noah Beery Sr.	United States	
Hurricane	Ralph Ince	Hobart Bosworth, Johnny Mack Brown, Leila Hyams, Alan Roscoe	United States	Sea adventure
The Iron Mask	Allan Dwan	Douglas Fairbanks, Belle Bennett, Nigel de Brulier, Marguerite de la Motte	United States	
The Isle of Lost Ships	Irvin Willat	Jason Robards Sr., Virginia Valli, Clarissa Selwynne, Noah Beery Sr.	United States	Sea adventure
The King of the Kongo	Richard Thorpe	Jacqueline Logan, Walter Miller, Boris Karloff	United States	Serial
The Lost Zeppelin	Edward Sloman	Conway Tearle, Virginia Valli, Ricardo Cortez	United States	
Noah's Ark	Michael Curtiz	George O'Brien, Dolores Costello	United States	Flood
The Pagan	W. S. Van Dyke	Ramon Novarro, Dorothy Janis, Donald Crisp	United States	
The Pirate of Panama	Ray Taylor	Jay Wilsey, Natalie Kingston, Al Ferguson	United States	Serial
The Rescue	Herbert Brenon	Ronald Colman, Lili Damita	United States	Sea adventure
The Smuggler's Bride of Mallorca	Hans Behrendt	Jenny Jugo, Friedrich Benfer, Clifford McLaglen	Germany	Sea adventure
Stark Mad	Lloyd Bacon	H. B. Warner	United States	
Tarzan the Tiger	Henry MacRae	Frank Merrill, Natalie Kingston	United States	Serial
The White Hell of Pitz Palu	Arnold Fanck, Georg Wilhelm Pabst	Leni Riefenstahl, Gustav Diessl	Germany	Mountaineering adventure
Woman in the Moon	Fritz Lang	Willy Fritsch, Gerda Maurus, Klaus Pohl, Fritz Rasp	Germany	Space adventure
