= List of science fiction films of the 1920s =

A list of science fiction films released in the 1920s. These films include core elements of science fiction and are widely available with reviews by reputable critics or film historians.

== List ==
Title	Director	Cast	Country	Subgenre/Notes
1920
Algol	Hans Werckmeister	Emil Jannings, John Gottowt, Hans Adalbert Schlettow	Germany	
Dr. Jekyll and Mr. Hyde	J. Charles Haydon	Sheldon Lewis	United States	
Dr. Jekyll and Mr. Hyde	John S. Robertson	John Barrymore, Martha Mansfield, Charles Willis Lane, Nita Naldi	United States	
Figures of the Night	Richard Oswald	Paul Wegener, Reinhold Schünzel, Conrad Veidt	Germany	
The Invisible Ray	Harry A. Pollard	Ruth Clifford, Jack Sherrill, Sidney Bracey	United States	Serial film, lost film
1921
Die Blitzzentrale	Valy Arnheim	Valy Arnheim, Victor Colani	Germany	
The Mechanical Man	Andre Deed	Gabriel Moreau, Valentina Frascaroli, Fernando Vivas-May	Italy	
1922
The Man from Beyond	Burton L. King	Harry Houdini, Arthur Maude, Albert Tavernier, Erwin Connelly	United States	
1923
Black Oxen	Frank Lloyd	Corinne Griffith, Conway Tearle, Clara Bow	United States	
1924
Aelita	Yakov Protazanov	Yuliya Solntseva, Igor Ilyinsky, Nikolai Tsereteli	Soviet Union	
The Hands of Orlac	Robert Wiene	Conrad Veidt, Alexandra Sorina, Fritz Kortner, Carmen Cartellieri	Austria	
Interplanetary Revolution	Nikolay Khodatayev, Zenon Komissarenko, Yuriy Merkulov		Soviet Union	Animated short film. Russian title: Межпланетная революция, tr. Mezhplanetnaya revolyutsiya
L'Inhumaine	Marcel L'Herbier	Georgette Leblanc, Jaque Catelain, Philippe Hériat	France	
The Last Man on Earth	John G. Blystone	Buck Black, Maurice Murphy, William Steele	United States	
1925
The Lost World	Harry Hoyt	Bessie Love, Lewis Stone, Wallace Beery, Lloyd Hughes, Alma Bennett	United States	
Luch Smerti	Lev Kuleshov	Porfiri Podobed, Vsevolod Pudovkin, Aleksandra Khokhlova	Soviet Union	
Paris Qui Dort	René Clair	Madeleine Rodrigue, Myla Seller, Henri Rollan	France	Sci-Fi Comedy
The Power God	Francis Ford, Ben F. Wilson	Ben F. Wilson, Neva Gerber, Mary Crane	United States	Serial film
Wunder Der Schöpfung	Hanns Walter Kornblum	Paul Bildt, Willy Kaiser-Heyl, Theodor Loos, Oscar Marion	Germany	
1927
Metropolis	Fritz Lang	Alfred Abel, Gustav Froehlich, Rudolf Klein-Rogge, Theodor Loos	Germany	
1928
Alraune	Henrik Galeen	Brigitte Helm	Germany	
1929
High Treason	Maurice Elvey	Benita Hume, Basil Gill, Jameson Thomas, Milton Rosmer	United Kingdom	
The Mysterious Island	Lucien Hubbard	Lionel Barrymore, Jane Daly, Lloyd Hughes	United States	
Woman in the Moon	Fritz Lang	Klaus Pohl, Willy Fritsch, Gerda Maurus, Fritz Rasp	Germany	

== See also ==
- History of science fiction films
