= Kunie Gomi =

- 五味國枝
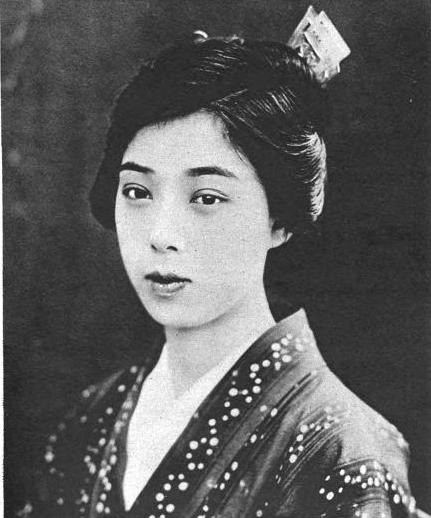
- in 1925
- Born: April 10, 1910; Osaka Prefecture, Empire of Japan
- Died: Unknown
- Years active: 1924–1933

Kunie Gomi (五味國枝, April 10, 1905 – unknown year of death) is a former Japanese actress. During her silent film days, she was active in Swashbuckler films and was called a genius. She was hired by various film studios and worked for many to be in the industry.
