= List of adventure films =

This is chronological list of adventure films split by decade. Often there may be considerable overlap particularly between adventure and other genres (including, action, drama, and fantasy films); the list documents films which are more closely related to adventure, even if they bend genres.

== Films by decade ==
- List of adventure films before 1920
- List of adventure films of the 1920s
- List of adventure films of the 1930s
- List of adventure films of the 1940s
- List of adventure films of the 1950s
- List of adventure films of the 1960s
- List of adventure films of the 1970s
- List of adventure films of the 1980s
- List of adventure films of the 1990s
- List of adventure films of the 2000s
- List of adventure films of the 2010s
- List of adventure films of the 2020s

== See also ==
- Epic film
- List of pirate films
- Road films
- Swashbuckler films
- Superhero film
- Survival film
