= Fool's Paradise (1921 film) =

1921 film

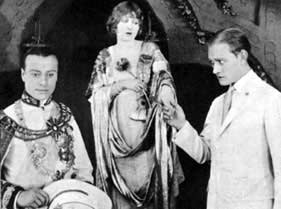
- Production still of John Davidson, Mildred Harris, and Conrad Nagel in Fool's Paradise
- Directed by: Cecil B. DeMille; Karl Struss (asst. director)
- Written by: Sada Cowan; Beulah Marie Dix
- Based on: "Laurels and the Lady" by Leonard Merrick
- Produced by: Cecil B. DeMille
- Starring: Dorothy Dalton; Mildred Harris; Conrad Nagel
- Cinematography: Alvin Wyckoff; Karl Struss
- Edited by: Anne Bauchens
- Production company: Famous Players–Lasky
- Distributed by: Paramount Pictures
- Release date: December 9, 1921
- Running time: 9 reels (8,681 feet)
- Country: United States
- Language: Silent (English intertitles)

Fool's Paradise is a 1921 American silent romance film directed by Cecil B. DeMille. The film stars Dorothy Dalton and Conrad Nagel. The film was based on the short story "Laurels and the Lady" by Leonard Merrick published in his 1908 collection The Man Who Understood Women. It was adapted for the screen by Sada Cowan and Beulah Marie Dix.

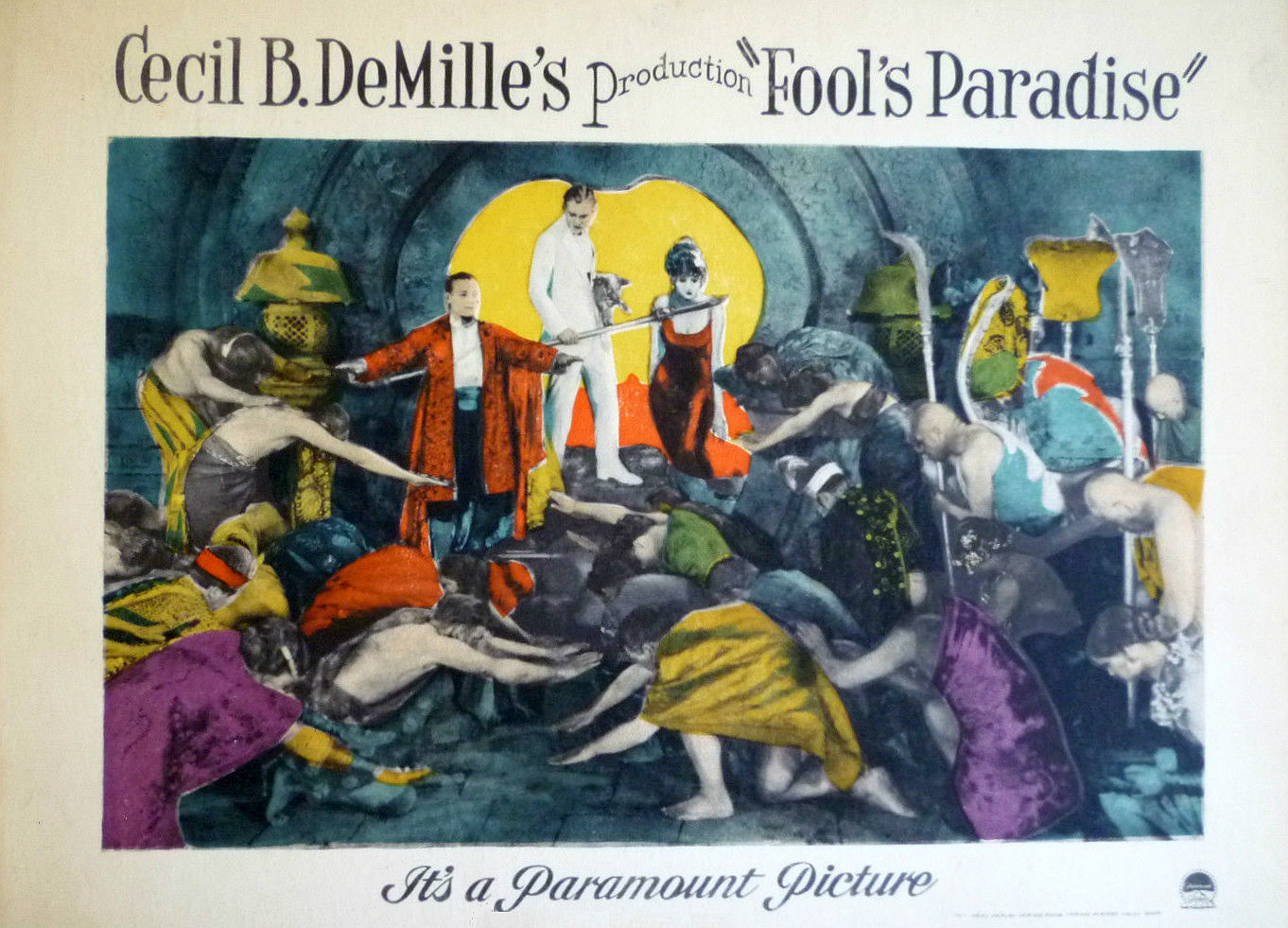
Lobby card

== Plot ==
As described in a film magazine, Arthur Phelps was injured during World War I and while in a French hospital had become dazzled by the beauty of French dancer Rosa Duchene. Back in the United States in an oil town along the Mexican border, Arthur meets American dancer Poll Patchouli in a Mexican cantina, and she falls in love with him. Rosa and her troupe are billed for a show in the local theater and while Arthur is waiting at the stage door to see his charmer, he lights a cigar that had been given to him by Poll. The cigar is of the trick kind, and the explosion that follows so injures Arthur's eyes that later while sitting in the theater watching the young French woman dance he becomes blind. Later Arthur wanders into the cantina while Poll is doing an impression of the French woman. Realizing that she has caused the blindness of the man she loves, Poll passes herself off as the French woman, imitating her voice and accent so perfectly that Arthur is deceived, and they are later married. They both live happily until Poll learns of the coming of a great eye specialist who could restore Arthur's sight. She takes him to the physician who restores his sight, and then Arthur leaves Poll and starts a search for Rosa. He finally tracks her down in Siam. After an incident there, Arthur realizes that it is Poll that he loves, and he returns to the Mexican border town in time to rescue Poll from the proprietor of the cantina, John Roderiguez. Arthur and Poll are remarried for the resulting happy ending.

== Cast ==
- Dorothy Dalton as Poll Patchouli
- Conrad Nagel as Arthur Phelps
- Mildred Harris as Rosa Duchene
- Theodore Kosloff as John Roderiguez
- John Davidson as Prince Talaat-Ni
- Julia Faye as Samaran, His Chief Wife
- Clarence Burton as Manuel
- Guy Oliver as Briggs
- Jacqueline Logan as Girda
- Kamuela C. Searle as Kay
- Baby Peggy as Child (uncredited)
- William Boyd (uncredited)
- Gertrude Short as Child (uncredited)

== Production notes ==
Production on the film began on April 4, 1921, and concluded on June 2, 1921. The film's budget was $291,367.56 and it went on to gross $901,937.79 at the box office.

== Release ==
Fool's Paradise premiered (in an extended 11,000-foot version) at the Criterion Theatre in New York City on December 19, 1921.

== Preservation ==
Fool's Paradise is fully extant. Prints of the film are held by:

- George Eastman Museum (on 35 mm)
- Library of Congress (on 35 mm)
- UCLA Film & Television Archive (on 35 mm and 16 mm)
