= Jane Connelly =

American stage and silent film actress

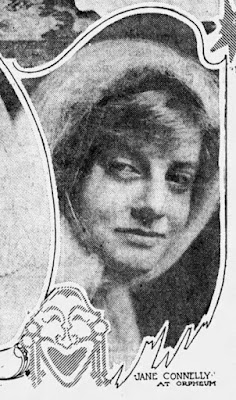
- Born: Ida Dora Belle Tenney; May 2, 1883; Port Huron, Michigan, U.S.
- Died: October 25, 1925 (aged 42); Los Angeles, California, U.S.
- Occupation: Actress
- Years active: 1907–1925
- Spouse: Erwin Connelly

Jane Connelly (born Ida Dora Belle Tenney; May 2, 1883 – October 25, 1925) was an American stage and silent film actress. She was best known for her vaudeville work alongside her husband, Erwin Connelly, and for her role in The Man from Beyond (1922) with Harry Houdini.

== Early life and stage career ==
Jane Connelly was born in Port Huron, Michigan. She and her husband Erwin Connelly began performing in vaudeville around 1907 gaining popularity in the vaudeville circuit. The couple built a solid reputation in theatrical circles over the course of nearly two decades.

One of their notable performances was in the play The Tale of a Shirtwhere Jane played a dreamy laundress and Erwin portrayed a kind-hearted character who captured her affections. They performed this play from 1919 until the early death of Jane Connelly in 1925.

== Transition to film ==
After their successful stage career, they both moved to Los Angeles. Jane and Erwin Connelly signed contracts with Metro and Universal Studios, and started appearing together (but not as a duo) in films. In The Man from Beyond with and produce by Houdini whom they knew well from the vaudeville days and in Keaton’s Sherlock Jr.

While Erwin Connelly primarily focused his career on films after 1923, Jane remained active on the Orphean vaudeville circuit, performing either solo or occasionally alongside her husband in their once-successful act, "Tale of a Shirt."

Jane died prematurely at 42 on October 25, 1925,”as a result of a nervous breakdown” bringing an end to their longstanding artistic partnership. Erwin Connelly continued his acting career in films until his own premature death in 1931 at 53.

== Filmography ==
- The Man from Beyond (1922) as Felice Strange/Felice Norcross
- Sherlock Jr. (1924) as The Mother
