= The Island of Desire =

1917 film

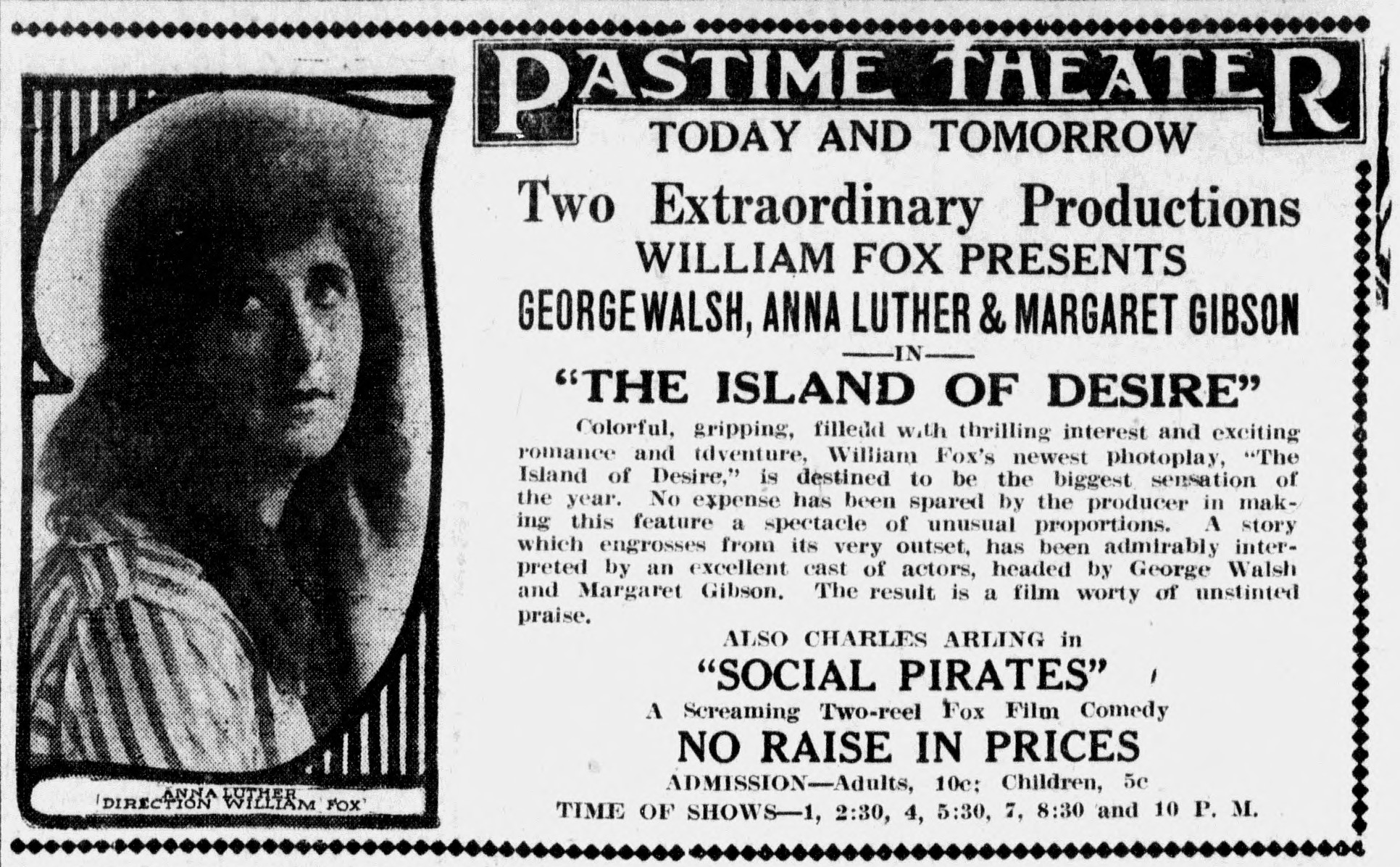
- Newspaper advertisement
- Directed by: Otis Turner
- Produced by: William Fox
- Starring: George Walsh
- Distributed by: Fox Film Corporation
- Release date: January 1, 1917
- Running time: 5 reels
- Country: USA
- Language: Silent film..(English intertitles)

The Island of Desire is a lost 1917 silent film adventure directed by Otis Turner, produced and distributed by Fox Film Corporation and starring George Walsh.

== Cast ==
- George Walsh - Bruce Chalmers
- Patricia Palmer - Leila Denham
- Anna Luther - Miss Needham
- Herschel Mayall - Henry Sayres
- William Burress - Tuan Yuck
- William Clifford - Toari
- Kamuela C. Searle - Tomi(*billed Sam Searles)
- Hector Sarno - Hamuka
- Marie McKeen - Ella Sayers
- Willard Louis - Sam Sweet
- Don the Dog - canine

== See also ==
- 1937 Fox vault fire
