= Sherlock Jr. =

1924 American film

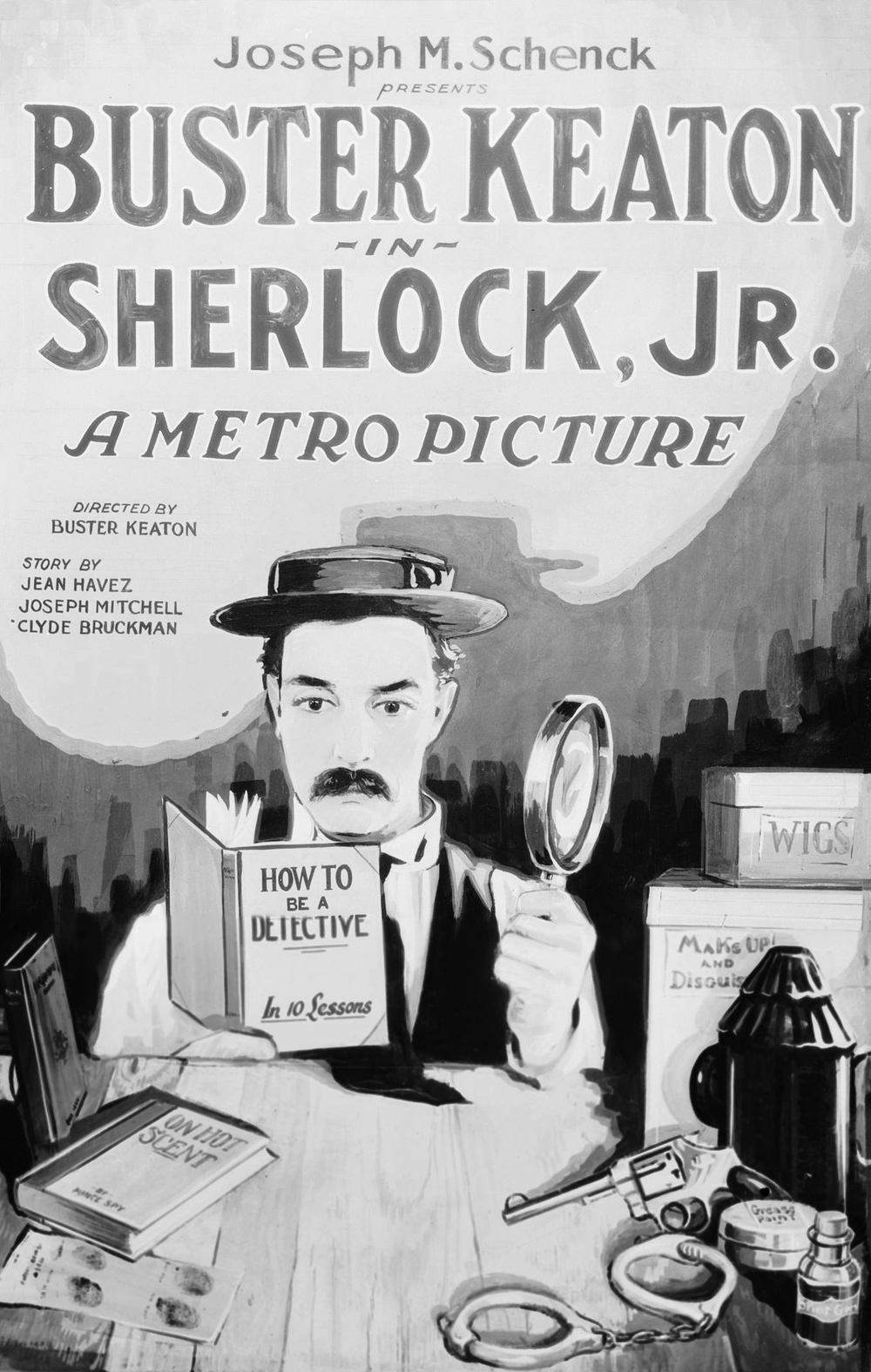
- Theatrical release poster
- Directed by: Buster Keaton
- Written by: Jean Havez; Joseph A. Mitchell; Clyde Bruckman
- Produced by: Joseph M. Schenck; Buster Keaton
- Starring: Buster Keaton
- Cinematography: Elgin Lessley; Byron Houck
- Edited by: Buster Keaton
- Music by: Club Foot Orchestra (1999); Craig Marks (2014); Timothy Brock (2015); Robert Israel (2020)
- Production company: Metro Pictures Corporation
- Distributed by: Metro-Goldwyn Pictures
- Release date: April 21, 1924
- Running time: 45 minutes (5 reels)
- Country: United States
- Language: Silent (English intertitles)
- Box office: $448,337

Sherlock Jr. is a 1924 American silent comedy film directed by and starring Buster Keaton and written by Clyde Bruckman, Jean Havez, and Joseph A. Mitchell. It features Kathryn McGuire, Joe Keaton, and Ward Crane.

In 1991, Sherlock Jr. was selected for preservation in the United States National Film Registry by the Library of Congress as being "culturally, historically, or aesthetically significant". In 2000, the American Film Institute, as part of its AFI 100 Years... series, ranked the film #62 in its AFI's 100 Years... 100 Laughs. David Thomson calls it "a breakthrough. It is as if a filmmaker had at last learned the point of the whole thing."

== Plot ==
Sherlock, Jr.

Buster Keaton stars as Projectionist, who moonlights as an amateur detective. When the cinema is empty, he reads the book How to be a Detective. He is in love with The Girl (Kathryn McGuire) but has a rival, "The Local Sheik" (Ward Crane). Neither has much money. He finds a dollar note in the garbage he swept up in the lobby. He takes it and adds it to the $2 he has. A woman comes and says that she lost a dollar. He gives it back. But then a sad old woman also says that she lost a dollar, so he gives that also, leaving himself with $1. A man comes and searches the garbage and finds a wallet full of money. Projectionist buys a $1 box of chocolates, all he can afford, and changes the price to $4 before giving it to the woman he loves at her house. He later gives her a ring.

The Sheik comes into the house and steals the pocket watch of the Girl's Father (Joe Keaton) and pawns it for $4. With the money, he buys a $3 box of chocolates for the Girl. When the Father notices that his watch is missing, the Sheik slips the pawn ticket into Projectionist's pocket unnoticed. Projectionist offers to solve the crime, but when the pawn ticket is found in his pocket, he is banished from the house. When the Sheik leaves, Projectionist shadows his every movement. The Sheik loses him by shutting him in a train car. Later, the Girl takes the pawn ticket to the pawnbroker and asks him to describe who pawned it. He points to the Sheik, standing outside.

While showing a film (advertised in the lobby as Hearts and Pearls) about the theft of a pearl necklace, Projectionist falls asleep and dreams that he enters the movie as a detective, Sherlock Jr. The other actors are replaced by Projectionist's acquaintances, with the Sheik taking the role of the Villain. The dream begins with the theft being committed by the Villain with the aid of the Butler. The Girl's Father calls for the world's greatest detective and Sherlock Jr. arrives.

Fearing that they will be caught, the Villain and the Butler attempt to kill Sherlock Jr. through several traps, poison, and an elaborate pool game with an exploding 13 ball. When these fail, the Villain and Butler try to escape. Sherlock Jr. tracks them down to a warehouse but is outnumbered by the gang to which the villain was selling the necklace. During the confrontation, Sherlock Jr. discovers that they have kidnapped the Girl. With the help of his assistant, Gillette, Sherlock Jr. manages to save the woman, and after a car chase, manages to defeat the gang.

When he awakens, the Girl shows up to tell him that she and her father learned the identity of the real thief after she went to the pawn shop to see who actually pawned the pocket watch. As a reconciliation scene happens to be playing on the screen, Projectionist mimics the actor's romantic behavior.

== Cast ==
- Buster Keaton as Projectionist / Sherlock Jr. – A poor, young projectionist who wants to marry The Girl. He has an interest in being a detective and when he falls asleep, he dreams of being Sherlock Jr., the world's greatest detective.
- Kathryn McGuire as The Girl – The daughter of a fairly wealthy man, whom the Projectionist is in love with. In the dream, she must be saved by Sherlock Jr.
- Joe Keaton as The Girl's Father – A man who is wealthier than most. He does not want his daughter marrying a thief. In the dream, he is a very rich man.
- Erwin Connelly as The Hired Man / The Butler – A hired man of the girl's father. In the dream, he is a co-conspirator in the theft of the necklace.
- Ward Crane as The Local Sheik / The Villain – A poor scoundrel that has his eyes for the girl. He steals the pocket watch, and in the dream, he is the villain who steals the necklace.
- Ford West as Theatre Manager / Gillette, Sherlock's assistant – The projectionist's boss in the real world. In the dream, he is the assistant. (uncredited)
- Rosalind Byrne as box office cashier (uncredited)
- Jane Connelly as The Mother (uncredited)
- George Davis as Conspirator (uncredited)
- Doris Deane as Girl Who Loses Dollar Outside Cinema (uncredited)
- Christine Francis as Candy Store Girl (uncredited)
- Betsy Ann Hisle as Little Girl (uncredited)
- Kewpie Morgan as Conspirator (uncredited)
- Steve Murphy as Conspirator (uncredited)
- John Patrick as Conspirator (uncredited)

== Production ==
Originally titled The Misfit, production began in January 1924 in Los Angeles. Keaton later said that his character walking onto the screen and into a film was "the reason for making the whole picture ... Just that one situation." Having cast her in Three Ages, Keaton cast Marion Harlan as the lead actress, but she became sick and was replaced by up-and-coming Keystone Studios actress Kathryn McGuire, who had previously starred in The Silent Call and was a WAMPAS Baby Star of 1923.

Keaton initially hired Roscoe "Fatty" Arbuckle as his co-director for the film. Keaton had been discovered by Arbuckle, whose career was at a standstill after being accused of raping Virginia Rappe in 1921. During the scandal and court case, Arbuckle had lost his mansion and cars and was in debt for $750,000. Keaton wanted to help his old friend and hired Arbuckle under the pseudonym "William Goodrich". It is believed that the idea for the film was a tribute to Oscar Heinrich, the forensic scientist involved in the rape trial against Arbuckle. Filming began well and Arbuckle was happy to be back on set, but after Keaton corrected a mistake that Arbuckle had made, his attitude changed dramatically.

Arbuckle became angry and abusive on set, yelling at actors and according to Keaton becoming "flushed and mad ... [the scandal] just changed his disposition." In his autobiography, Keaton claimed that Arbuckle was difficult to work with and he arranged for him to direct The Red Mill instead so that Keaton could complete the film alone. The Red Mill did not begin production until 1927. Arbuckle's second wife Doris Deane later claimed that Arbuckle had directed the entire film and had come up with all of the ideas for the film.

The production included one of Keaton's most famous on-set accidents. In a scene where Keaton grabs a water spout while walking on a moving boxcar train, the water unexpectedly flooded down on Keaton much harder than anticipated, throwing him to the ground. The back of Keaton's neck slammed against a steel rail on the ground and caused him to black out. The pain was so intense that Keaton had to stop shooting later that day and he had "blinding headaches" for weeks afterwards, but continued working, having a well-known high threshold for physical pain.

It was not until 1935 that a doctor spotted a callus over a fracture in Keaton's top vertebra in an X-ray. The doctor informed Keaton that he had broken his neck during the accident nine years earlier and not realized it. Keaton famously always performed his own stunts, and this was not the only accident on set. In another scene, the motorcycle Keaton was riding skidded and smashed into two cameras, knocking over Eddie Cline and throwing Keaton onto a nearby car.

Sherlock Jr. was also Keaton's most complicated film for special optical effects and in-camera tricks. The film's most famous trick shot involves Keaton jumping into a small suitcase and disappearing. Keaton later said that it was an old vaudeville trick that his father had invented, and he later performed it on the Ed Sullivan Show in 1957, but never publicly revealed how he did it. The trick was accomplished with a trap door behind the suitcase and an actor lying horizontally with long clothes hiding his absent bottom torso, which then allowed the actor to smoothly fall forward and walk as though he had always been standing vertically.

Keaton later said that they "spent an awful lot of time getting those scenes". Filming took four months, while typically it took Keaton two months to finish a feature film. The editing was also difficult and took longer than a typical Keaton film. Keaton later told film historian Kevin Brownlow "every cameraman in the business went to see that picture more than once trying to figure out how the hell we did some of that."

Keaton depicted an early example of a film within a film in the dream sequence. Keaton's character leaves the projection room and goes down into the theater, then walks into the film being screened on the stage. Keaton later explained that this stunt was achieved through the use of lighting: "We built a stage with a big black cut-out screen. Then we built the front-row seats and orchestra pit. ... We lit the stage so it looked like a motion picture being projected on to a screen".

Keaton's character is kicked out of the film a few times but finally manages to stay in, and is depicted in a series of different scenes including a park, a lake and a desert, through a series of cuts. This was unique at the time because there was a continuity to the scenes and this strategy had rarely been used by filmmakers before. Keaton and his cameraman were able to do this by using surveyor's instruments to position Keaton and the camera at exactly the right distances and positions to support the illusion of continuity.

== Music ==
In 1997, Australian ensemble Blue Grassy Knoll who specialise in scoring for Keaton's films, wrote a score for Sherlock Jr which premiered at the Melbourne International Film Festival. They have since performed the score around the world, including the New Victory Theatre in New York, the Edinburgh Fringe Festival, and most recently an outdoor screening in Federation Square, Melbourne.

In 2014, the Dallas Chamber Symphony commissioned Craig Marks to write an original musical score for Sherlock Jr. It premiered during a concert screening at Moody Performance Hall on February 25, 2014, with Richard McKay conducting.

== Reception ==
=== Release and critical response ===
Keaton first previewed the film in Long Beach, California. Although audience members gasped at some of the special effects, there were very few laughs, and Keaton began re-editing the film to make it funnier. However, the second preview screening was more disappointing than the first, and Keaton continued cutting the film down to a very short 5-reel film. Producer Joseph Schenck wanted Keaton to add another 1,000 feet of film (approximately 11 minutes), but Keaton refused.

The film was retitled Sherlock Jr. and released on April 21, 1924. It made $448,337, slightly less than Three Ages. Keaton considered the film "alright [but] not one of the big ones", possibly due to the fact that it was his first real failure after a 25-year career on stage and screen.

Sherlock Jr. received mixed critical reviews. It received good reviews from The New York Times, which called it "one of the best screen tricks ever incorporated in a comedy", and Photoplay, which called it "rare and refreshing". Other positive notices came from The Los Angeles Times, The Washington Post, and The Atlanta Constitution. Negative reviews included Picture Play, which wrote that it was devoid of "ingenuity and originality". Variety wrote it was as funny as "a hospital operating room". Edmund Wilson of The New Republic criticized Keaton's performance for not having enough character development and the film for having too much "machinery and stunts". In The Nation in 1946, critic James Agee wrote, "Sherlock, Jr. is not one of Buster Keaton's funniest—none of his full-length films were—but it is about a hundred times as funny as anything made today. Some of the houses, yards, and streets are even more beautifully photographed than was usual in the old comedies. And one chase gag, involving a motorcycle and a long line of ditch-diggers, is hair-raising both in its mechanical perfection and as a piece of better-than-conscious surrealism."

=== Legacy ===
Dwight Macdonald, in his book On Movies, notes the sophistication of the premise:

the second half of Sherlock Junior cuts free across magical territory. By a great stroke of invention, the lovesick Buster is a movie projectionist, so that the medium becomes the artist's material, an advanced approach Buster had never heard of ... He falls asleep in the projection booth, dreaming about his girl and his frustrated love. His doppelganger extracts itself from his sleeping body ... and walks down the aisle of the darkened theatre to climb up on the stage and into the society-crook melodrama being projected on the screen ... There's no explanation for this or any other lapsus naturalis in this 1924 film which makes later efforts by Dalí, Buñuel and Cocteau look pedestrian and a bit timid. They felt obliged to clarify matters by a symbolistic apparatus. Keaton never rose—or sunk—to that.

In 2005, Time named Sherlock Jr. as one of the All-Time 100 Movies, writing "The impeccable comedian directs himself in an impeccable silent comedy ... Is this, as some critics have argued, an example of primitive American surrealism? Sure. But let's not get fancy about it. It is more significantly, a great example of American minimalism—simple objects and movement manipulated in casually complex ways to generate a steadily rising gale of laughter. The whole thing is only 45 minutes long, not a second of which is wasted. In an age when most comedies are all windup and no punch, this is the most treasurable of virtues."

Dennis Schwartz wrote that Sherlock Jr. is "one of Buster's superior silent comedies that's noted for his usual deadpan humor, frolicsome slapstick, the number of very funny sight gags, the many innovative technical accomplishments and that he did his own stunts (including the dangerous one where he was hanging off a ladder connected to a huge water basin as the water poured out and washed him onto the railroad track, fracturing his neck nearly to the point of breaking it. Keaton suffered from severe migraines for years after making this movie)." David Thomson calls Sherlock Jr. Keaton's "masterpiece" and "the most philosophically eloquent of silent comedies".

Rotten Tomatoes reports an 87% approval from 45 critics, with the consensus summarizing: "Sherlock, Jr. showcases enough of Buster Keaton's brilliance to make it well worth a watch, even if the laughs don't flow quite as freely as they do with some of his other features."

Sherlock Jr. was a major influence on Woody Allen's The Purple Rose of Cairo (1985), in which a character walks out of a movie and into real life. Forty minutes into the film, Buster jams on the brakes of the car he is driving, causing the chassis to stop and the body to keep going, a gag reused in the James Bond film The Living Daylights (1987)[?]. In 2012, it was ranked number 61 in a list of the best-edited films of all time as selected by the members of the Motion Picture Editors Guild. In the 2012 Sight & Sound polls, it was ranked the 59th-greatest film ever made in the critics' poll. In 2015, Sherlock Jr. ranked 44th on BBC's "100 Greatest American Films" list, voted on by film critics from around the world. On January 5, 2023, Richard Brody included it on his list of "Thirty-four Movies That Celebrate the Movies".

On January 1, 2020, the film entered into the public domain in the United States.

=== Accolades ===
In 1991, Sherlock Jr. was selected for preservation in the United States National Film Registry by the Library of Congress as being "culturally, historically, or aesthetically significant".

The film was ranked 62nd on the American Film Institute's list AFI's 100 Years...100 Laughs (2000).

== See also ==
- Buster Keaton filmography
- List of United States comedy films
- List of films featuring fictional films

== Bibliography ==
- Meade, Marion (1997). Buster Keaton: Cut to the Chase (1st ed.). New York: Da Capo Press. ISBN 0306808021.
- Knopf, Robert (1999). The Theater and Cinema of Buster Keaton. Princeton University Press. ISBN 9780691004426.
