= Male and Female =

1919 film by Cecil B. DeMille

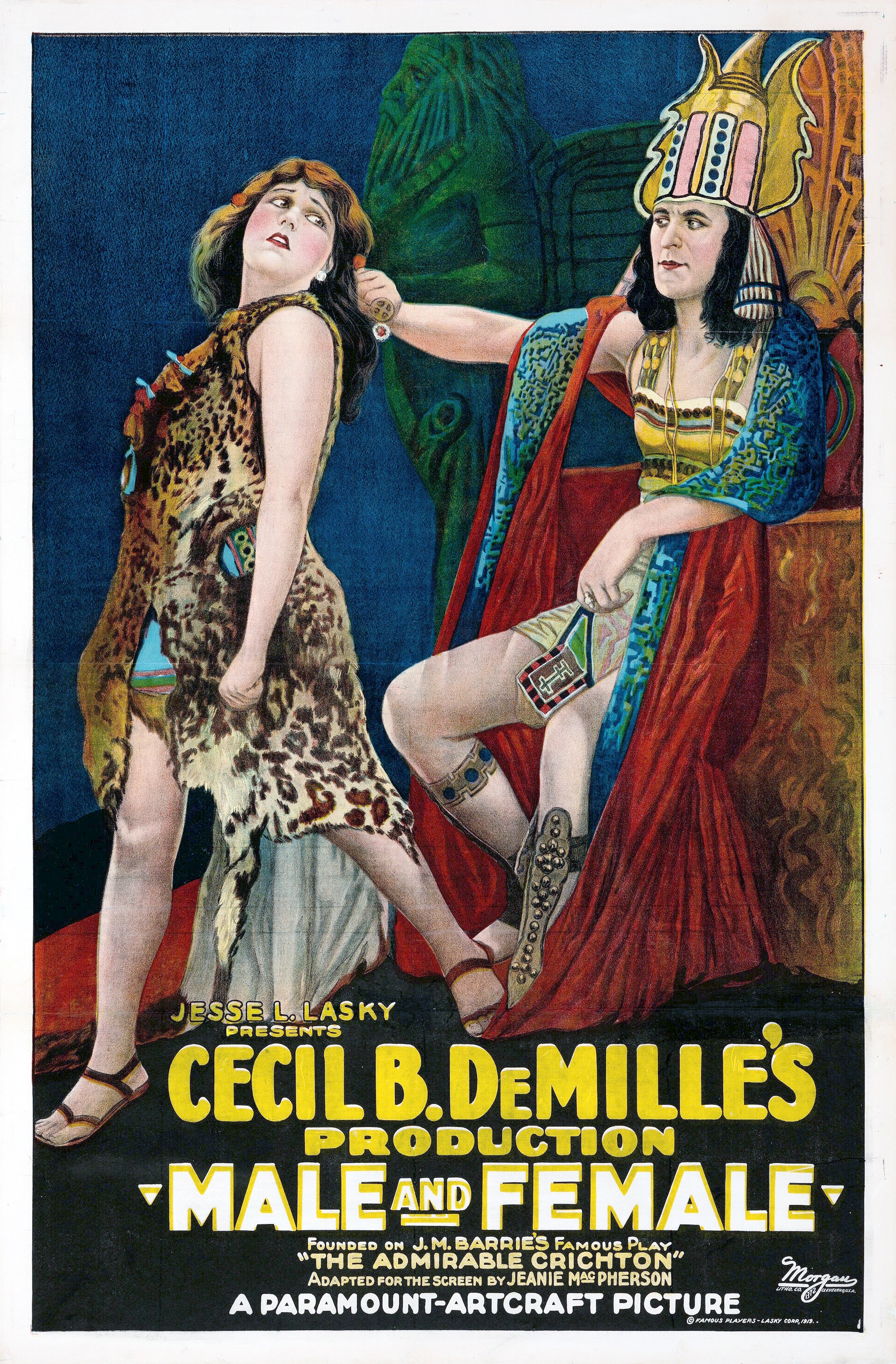
- Theatrical release poster
- Directed by: Cecil B. DeMille
- Written by: Jeanie MacPherson
- Based on: The Admirable Crichton by J. M. Barrie
- Produced by: Cecil B. DeMille; Jesse L. Lasky
- Starring: Gloria Swanson; Thomas Meighan
- Cinematography: Alvin Wyckoff
- Edited by: Anne Bauchens
- Music by: Sydney Jill Lehman (1997 version)
- Production company: Famous Players–Lasky/Artcraft
- Distributed by: Paramount Pictures
- Release date: November 23, 1919
- Running time: 116 minutes
- Country: United States
- Language: Silent (English intertitles)
- Budget: $168,619.28
- Box office: $1,256,226.59

Male and Female

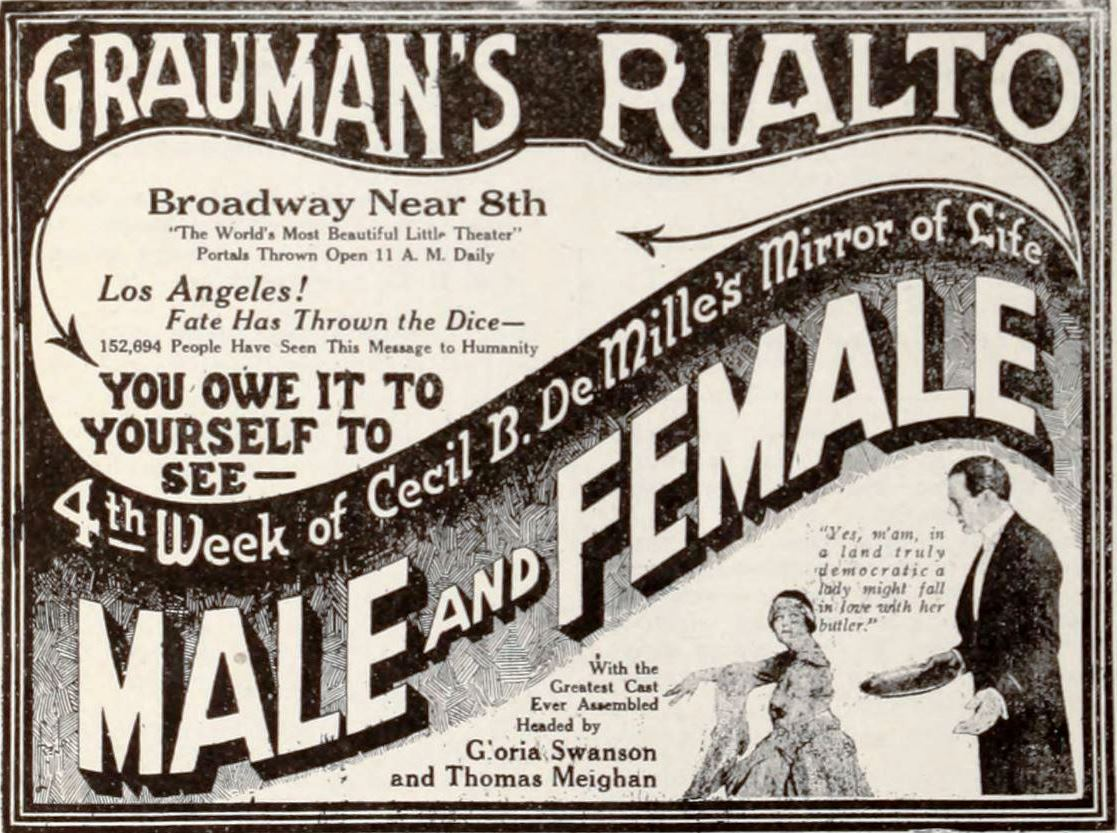
Grauman’s Rialto advertisement for the film Male and Female (1919)

Male and Female is a 1919 American silent adventure/drama film directed by Cecil B. DeMille and starring Gloria Swanson and Thomas Meighan. Its main themes are gender relations and social class. The film is based on the 1902 J. M. Barrie play The Admirable Crichton.

A previous version was filmed the year before in England as The Admirable Crichton.

== Plot ==
The film centers on the relationship between Lady Mary Loam, a British aristocrat, and her butler, Crichton. Crichton fancies a romance with Mary, but she disdains him because of his lower social class. When the two and some others are shipwrecked on a deserted island, they are left to fend for themselves in a state of nature.

The aristocrats' abilities to survive are far worse than those of Crichton, and a role reversal ensues, with the butler becoming a king among the stranded group. Crichton and Mary are about to wed on the island when the group is rescued. Upon returning to Britain, Crichton chooses not to marry Mary; instead, he asks a maid, Tweeny (who was attracted to Crichton throughout the film), to marry him, and the two move to the United States.

== Cast ==
- Lila Lee as Tweeny, the scullery maid
- Theodore Roberts as Lord Loam
- Raymond Hatton as Honorable Ernest 'Ernie' Wolley
- Mildred Reardon as Lady Agatha 'Aggie' Lasenby
- Gloria Swanson as Lady Mary Lasenby
- Thomas Meighan as Crichton, the butler
- Robert Cain as Lord Brockelhurst
- Bebe Daniels as King's Favorite
- Julia Faye as Susan, 2nd Maid
- Rhy Darby as Lady Eileen Duncraigie
- Edmund Burns as Treherne
- Henry Woodward as McGuire, Lady Eileen's Chauffeur
- Sydney Deane as Thomas
- Wesley Barry as Buttons, the Boy
- Slats the Lion
- Kamuela C. Searle (uncredited)

== Production ==
The film contains two famous scenes, indicative of de Mille's predilections as a filmmaker.

- An early scene depicts Gloria Swanson bathing in an elaborate setting, attended by two maids, lavishing her with rosewater and bath salts, silk dressing gown, and luxurious towels.
- Toward the end of the film, a fantasy sequence about ancient Babylon shows Swanson posed as Gabriel von Max's famous painting The Lion's Bride, which involved her being photographed with an actual lion.

Kenneth Macgowan stated in his 1965 history of film Behind the Screen that the title was changed because Paramount was concerned that audiences would confuse the words "admirable" and "admiral" and "stay away because 'sea pictures weren't very popular'".

== Preservation ==
Prints of Male and Female are held by:

- Cinematheque Royale de Belgique
- Cinemateca do Museu de Arte Moderna
- Filmoteka Narodowa in Warsaw
- George Eastman Museum, on 35 mm
- Museum Of Modern Art
- Cineteca Nazionale in Rome, on 35 mm
- Library of Congress, on 35 mm and DVD
- UCLA Film and Television Archive, on 16 mm
- Academy Film Archive

== DVD release ==
Male and Female was released on Region 0 DVD-R by Alpha Video on January 28, 2014.

== See also ==
- List of American films of 1919
- The House That Shadows Built (1931 promotional film by Paramount)
