= The Sea Wolf (1920 film) =

1920 film by George Melford

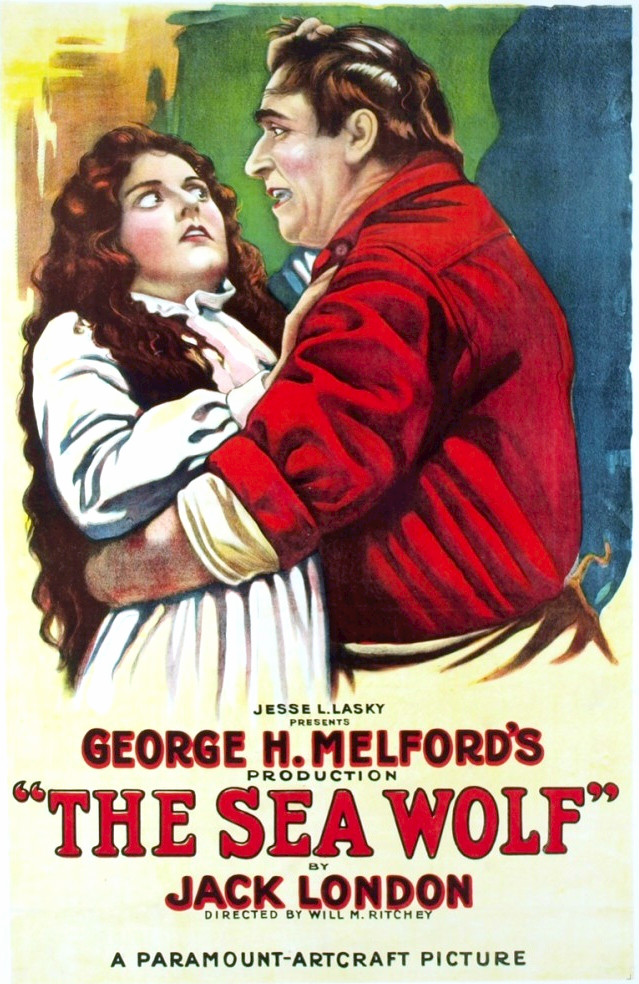
- Film poster
- Directed by: George Melford
- Written by: Will M. Ritchey (scenario)
- Based on: The Sea-Wolf; 1904 novel by Jack London
- Produced by: George Melford
- Starring: Noah Beery, Sr.
- Cinematography: Paul P. Perry
- Distributed by: Paramount Pictures / Artcraft
- Release date: May 16, 1920
- Running time: 70 minutes
- Country: United States
- Language: Silent (English intertitles)

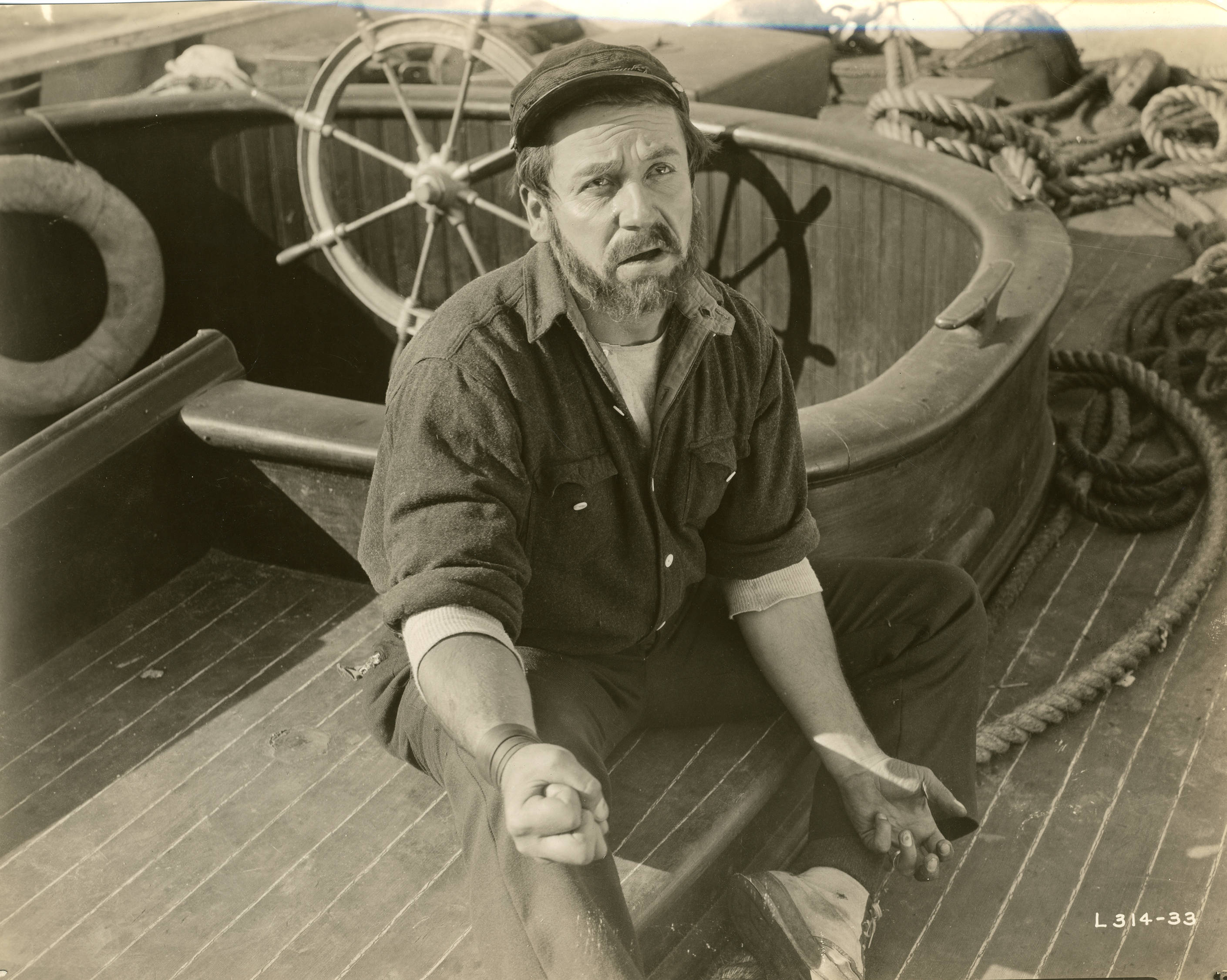
Noah Beery as Wolf Larsen

The Sea Wolf is a lost 1920 American drama film based upon the 1904 novel by Jack London, directed by George Melford, and starring Noah Beery as the brutal sea captain Wolf Larsen, sometimes referred to as "The Sea Wolf." The supporting cast includes Mabel Julienne Scott, Tom Forman, Raymond Hatton, and A. Edward Sutherland.

The film was remade twenty-one years later with Edward G. Robinson in Beery's role.

== Plot ==
As described in a film magazine, Wolf Larsen, the captain of the sealing steamer Ghost, is severely injured in a fight with his brother Death Larsen on the day he is set to sail. Following the wreck of a ferry boat, wealthy idler Humphrey Van Weyden and his fiancée Maud Brewster are rescued by Larson's crew. Wolf refuses to put the couple ashore and instead makes Humphrey the cabin boy. George Leach, the former cabin boy, and sailor Old Man Johnson, angered by Wolf's brutal treatment, throw Wolf and his mate Black Harris overboard. The mate drowns, but Wolf manages to return to the deck, where he beats his entire crew. Death Larsen's ship comes into sight, and Death, along with part of his crew, attempts to board Wolf's ship but is overpowered and bound. That night, Wolf steers his ship into a fog bank to escape. Wolf later attacks Maud in her cabin, and Humphrey puts up a losing fight. At the climax, Wolf succumbs to a severe headache and is left alone on the Ghost after his crew deserts him and the ship runs aground on an uninhabited island. Maud cares for the paralyzed, blind, and helpless Wolf until he dies, after which she and Humphrey are rescued by a revenue cutter.

== Cast ==
- Noah Beery as Wolf Larsen
- Mabel Julienne Scott as Maud Brewster
- Tom Forman as Humphrey Van Weyden
- James Gordon as "Death" Larsen
- Raymond Hatton as Thomas Mugridge, the Cook
- A. Edward Sutherland as George Leach, the Cabin Boy (billed as Eddie Sutherland)
- Walter Long as "Black" Harris, the Mate
- Fred Huntley as Old Man Johnson
- Kamuela C. Searle as A Seaman
- Peggy Pearce in undetermined role

== Gallery ==
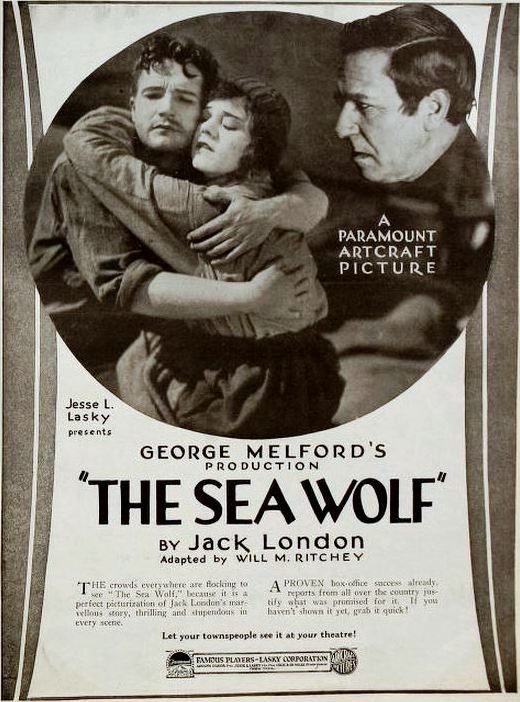

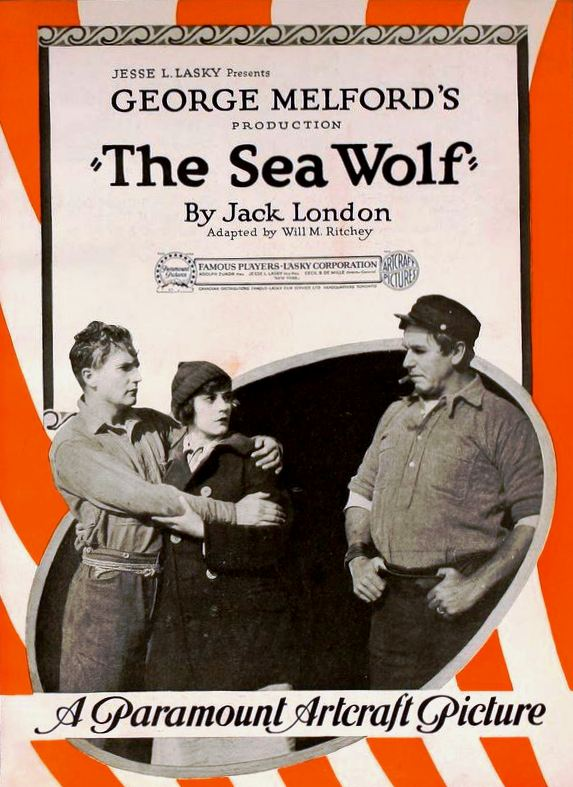

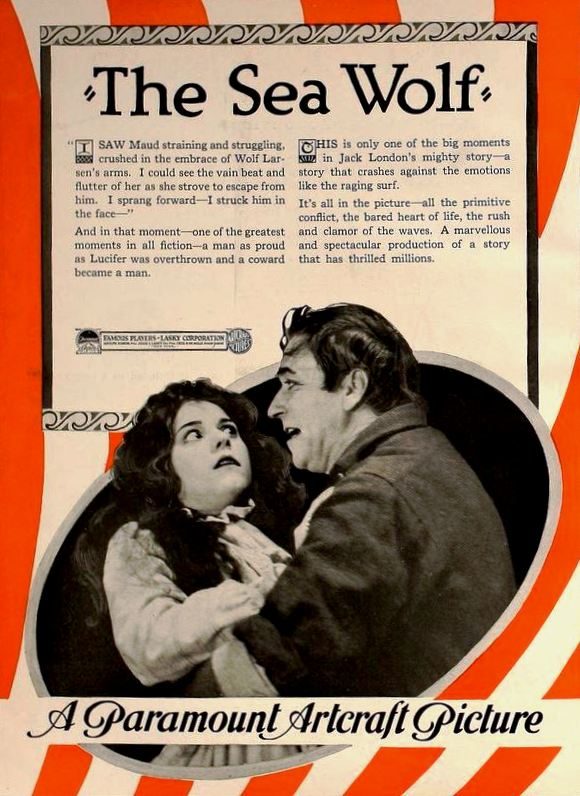
