= Kamuela C. Searle =

American actor and artist (1890–1924)

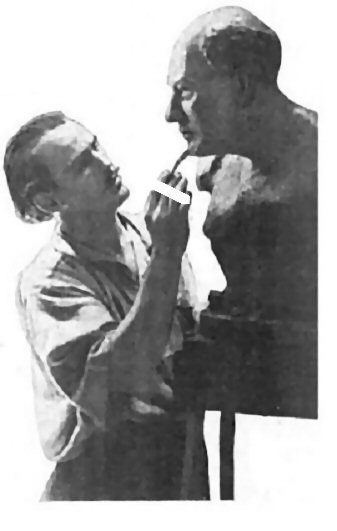
- Motion Picture Magazine, 1922
- Born: Samuel Cooper Searle; August 29, 1890; Waiʻōhinu, Kaʻū, Hawai’i
- Died: February 14, 1924 (aged 33); Los Angeles, California, U.S.
- Occupations: Actor; sculptor; painter
- Years active: 1917–1924

Kamuela C. Searle (August 29, 1890 – February 14, 1924) was an actor, sculptor, and painter, best remembered for his portrayal of Korak, the son of Tarzan and Jane.

== Early life ==
Born Samuel Cooper Searle in Waiʻōhinu, Kaʻū, Hawai’i, Searle was the son of an American sugar plantation owner and an Anglo-Irish mother. He grew up hunting and swimming, with little formal schooling.

After arriving in San Francisco at age 17, Searle worked as a sparring partner for boxer Harlem Tommy Murphy. He later met film director Cecil B. DeMille on the beach at Waikiki in 1915. DeMille encouraged Searle to go to Hollywood and pursue a film career. Legend has it that Searle appeared in a couple of DeMille's films during this time, but there is no definite proof.

He enlisted in the United States Army during World War I, and fought and was wounded in France. Upon his discharge, Searle adopted Kamuela (the Hawaiian spelling of Samuel) as his first name.

== Film career ==
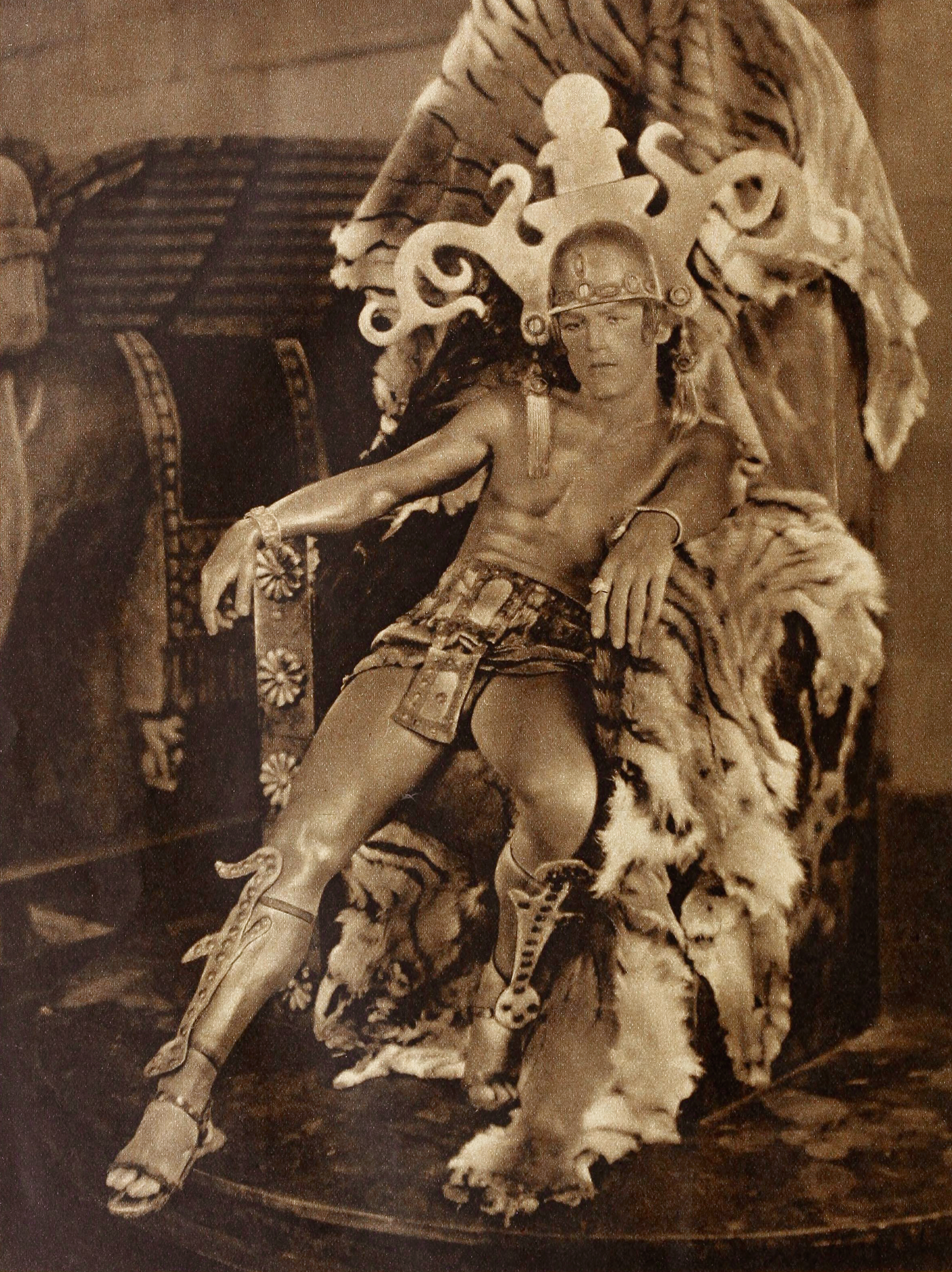
Searle in Male and Female (1919), photographed by Karl Struss

Searle worked as a stunt double, performing swimming and riding stunts for other actors. His first credited role, as Sam Searles, was in The Island of Desire (1917). Searle appeared, uncredited, in DeMille's 1919 film Male and Female.

Cowboy actor Jack Hoxie was originally slated to play the adult Jack Clayton (known by the ape name Korak) in the 1920 film serial The Son of Tarzan, but was dropped from the production before filming began. Searle was cast and enthusiastically spent a month in the desert to "harden" himself for the role. Many sources, including Gabe Essoe's Tarzan of the Movies, have incorrectly stated that Searle was mortally wounded when an elephant carrying him bound to a stake slammed him to the ground. Though he was hurt enough that a double completed a few final long shots, Searle recovered from his injuries.

That same year, Searle played a supporting role in The Sea Wolf, based on the Jack London novel and starring Noah Beery in the title role.

Searle completed one more film, Cecil B. DeMille's Fool's Paradise (1921).

== Filmography ==
Year	Title	Role	Notes
1917	The Island of Desire	Tomi	credited as Sam Searles
1919	Male and Female		uncredited
1920	The Son of Tarzan	Korak	serial
1920	The Sea Wolf	Seaman	
1921	Fool's Paradise	Kay	

== Art career ==
Searle retired from acting to concentrate on sculpting and painting. He began sculpting in 1921 after impulsively buying $60 worth of potter's clay and tools.

While working on the ranch of former Secretary of the Treasury Lyman J. Gage near San Diego, Searle was noticed modeling and encouraged by Gage. He made a bust of Gage, then one of Luther Burbank. The Santa Rosa Chamber of Commerce purchased the Burbank bust to be cast in bronze for the Hall of Fame in Washington.

In early 1921, Searle traveled to Arizona and New Mexico with New York sculptor Cartino Starpitto. In Santa Fe, he painted his first painting, an Arizona landscape, which the city purchased. Two months later, he held an exhibition in Los Angeles; three paintings sold.

At the time of the 1922 Los Angeles Times profile, Searle was working on a bust of Cecil B. DeMille and planned to begin a ten-foot statue of swimmer Duke Kahanamoku.

== Death ==
According to his brother, Searle died of cancer in 1924 at age 33.
