= List of fantasy films before 1930 =

A list of fantasy films released before the 1930s.

Title	Director	Cast	Country	Notes
1899
Cinderella (1899 film)	Georges Méliès	Georges Méliès	France	Fairy tale short film
1903
The Infernal Boiling Pot	Georges Méliès	Georges Méliès	France	Short film
1904
The Impossible Voyage	Georges Méliès	Georges Méliès	France	Short science fantasy film
1910
The Wonderful Wizard of Oz	Otis Turner	Bebe Daniels, Hobart Bosworth, Eugenie Besserer	United States	Short film
1911
L'Inferno	Francesco Bertolini, Adolfo Padovan, Giuseppe de Liguoro	Salvatore Papa, Arturo Pirovano, Giuseppe de Liguoro	Italy	Short film
1912
Santa Claus	Walter R. Booth, R. H. Callum and F. Martin Thornton	Leedham Bantock, Margaret Favronova	United Kingdom	Short film
1915
The Story of a Story	Tod Browning		United States	Short film
1917
Flames	Maurice Elvey	Douglas Munro, Owen Nares, Edward O'Neill	United Kingdom	Silent film
1918
The Blue Bird	Maurice Tourneur	Emma Lowry, Robin Macdougall, William J. Gross	United States	Silent film
Tarzan of the Apes	Scott Sidney	Elmo Lincoln	United States	Fantasy silent film
The Ghost of Slumber Mountain	Willis O'Brien		United States	Stop motion
1921
Körkarlen	Victor Sjöström	Victor Sjöström, Hilda Borgström, Astrid Holm	Sweden	Silent film
Der müde Tod	Fritz Lang	Lil Dagover, Walter Janssen, Bernhard Goetzke	Germany	Silent film
L'Atlantide	Jacques Feyder		France	Silent film
1922
Häxan	Benjamin Christensen	Benjamin Christensen, Clara Pontoppidan, Oscar Stribolt, Astrid Holm, Maren Pedersen	Sweden	Silent film
Nosferatu: A Symphony of Horror	F. W. Murnau	Max Schreck, Gustav von Wangenheim, Greta Schröder, Alexander Granach	Weimar Republic	Silent film
Phantom	F. W. Murnau	Hans Heinrich Von Twardowski, Frida Richard, Aud Egede Nissen	Germany	Silent film
1924
Dante's Inferno	Henry Otto	Lawson Butt, Howard Gaye, Ralph Lewis	United States	Silent film
Die Nibelungen: Siegfried	Fritz Lang	Paul Richter, Margarete Schön, Hanna Ralph	Germany	Silent film
Die Nibelungen: Kriemhilds Rache	Fritz Lang	Rudolf Rittner, Margarete Schön, Hans Adalbert Schlettow	Germany	Silent film
The Enchanted Cottage	John S. Robertson	Richard Barthelmess, May McAvoy, Ida Waterman	United States	Silent film
Paris Qui Dort	René Clair	Madeleine Rodrigue, Myla Seller, Henri Rollan	France	Silent film
Peter Pan	Herbert Brenon	Betty Bronson, Ernest Torrence, Cyril Chadwick	United States	Silent film
The Thief of Bagdad	Raoul Walsh	Douglas Fairbanks, Snitz Edwards, Julanne Johnston	United States	Silent film
Waxworks	Paul Leni	Werner Krauss, Conrad Veidt, William Dieterle	Germany	Silent film
1925
The Lost World	Harry Hoyt	Bessie Love, Lloyd Hughes, Wallace Beery	United States	Silent film
She	Leander de Cordova, G.B. Samuelson	Betty Blythe	United Kingdom	Silent film
Wizard of Oz	Larry Semon	Larry Semon, Bryant Washburn, Dorothy Dwan	United States	Silent film
1926
Adventures of Prince Achmed	Lotte Reiniger		Germany	Animated film
Faust	F.W. Murnau	Gösta Ekman, Emil Jannings, Camilla Horn	Germany	Silent film
A Kiss for Cinderella	Herbert Brenon	Betty Bronson, Tom Moore, Esther Ralston	United States	Silent film
The Sorrows of Satan	D.W. Griffith	Adolphe Menjou, Ricardo Cortez, Carol Dempster	United States	Silent film
The Student of Prague	Henrik Galeen	Conrad Veidt, Werner Krauss	Germany	Silent film
