= Erwin Connelly =

American actor

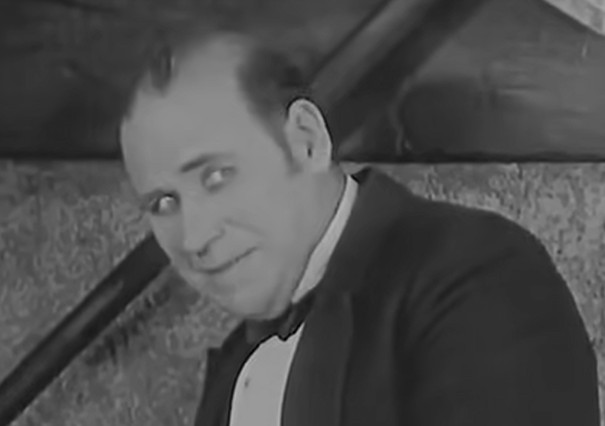
- Born: January 14, 1878; Illinois, U.S.
- Died: December 2, 1931 (aged 53); California, U.S.
- Occupations: Actor, vaudeville performer

Erwin Connelly (January 14, 1878 – February 12, 1931) was an American actor, known for his contributions to silent films during the 1920s. Before transitioning to a film career, Connelly was a prominent stage performer, particularly in vaudeville, where he performed alongside his wife, Jane Connelly, for seventeen years.

== Early life and stage career ==
Erwin Connelly was born on January 14, 1878, in Chicago, Illinois. He began his career on stage, gaining popularity in the vaudeville circuit. Together with his wife, actress Jane , the couple built a solid reputation in theatrical circles over the course of nearly two decades

One of their notable performances was in the 1919 play The Tale of a Shirt at the Alhambra Theatre, New York, where Jane played a dreamy laundress and he portrayed a kind-hearted character who captured her affections.

== Transition to film ==
After their successful stage career, they both moved to Los Angeles. Connelly signed contracts with Metro and Universal Studios, appearing in several notable films throughout the 1920s.

Jane died on October 25, 1925, bringing an end to their longstanding artistic partnership. Connelly continued his acting career in films after her death.

== Death ==
Connelly's life and career were cut short by a car accident in Los Angeles on February 12, 1931.

== Filmography ==
- The Man from Beyond (1922) – Dr. Gregory Sinclair
- Our Hospitality (1923) – Quarreling Husband
- Sherlock Jr. (1924) – The Butler
- Seven Chances (1925) – The Clergyman
- Beggar on Horseback (1925) – Mr. Cady
- When Husbands Flirt (1925) – Joe McCormick
- The Danger Girl (1926) – Henderson
- The Crown of Lies (1926) – Stage Manager
- The Blind Goddess (1926) – Chief Detective
- Kiki (1926) – Joly
- Shipwrecked (1926) – Chumbley
- The Son of the Sheik (1926) – Zouave (uncredited)
- The Winning of Barbara Worth (1926) – Pat Mooney
- The Fire Brigade (1926) – Thomas Wainright
- Rubber Tires (1927) – Pa Stack
- Cheating Cheaters (1927) – Mr. Brockton
- Under Suspicion (1930) – Darby
- Fair Warning (1931) – Morgan

== Sources ==
- Erwin Connelly at the American Film Institute Catalog
- Erwin and Jane Connelly at Vaudeville America
