= The Man from Beyond =

1922 film by Burton L. King

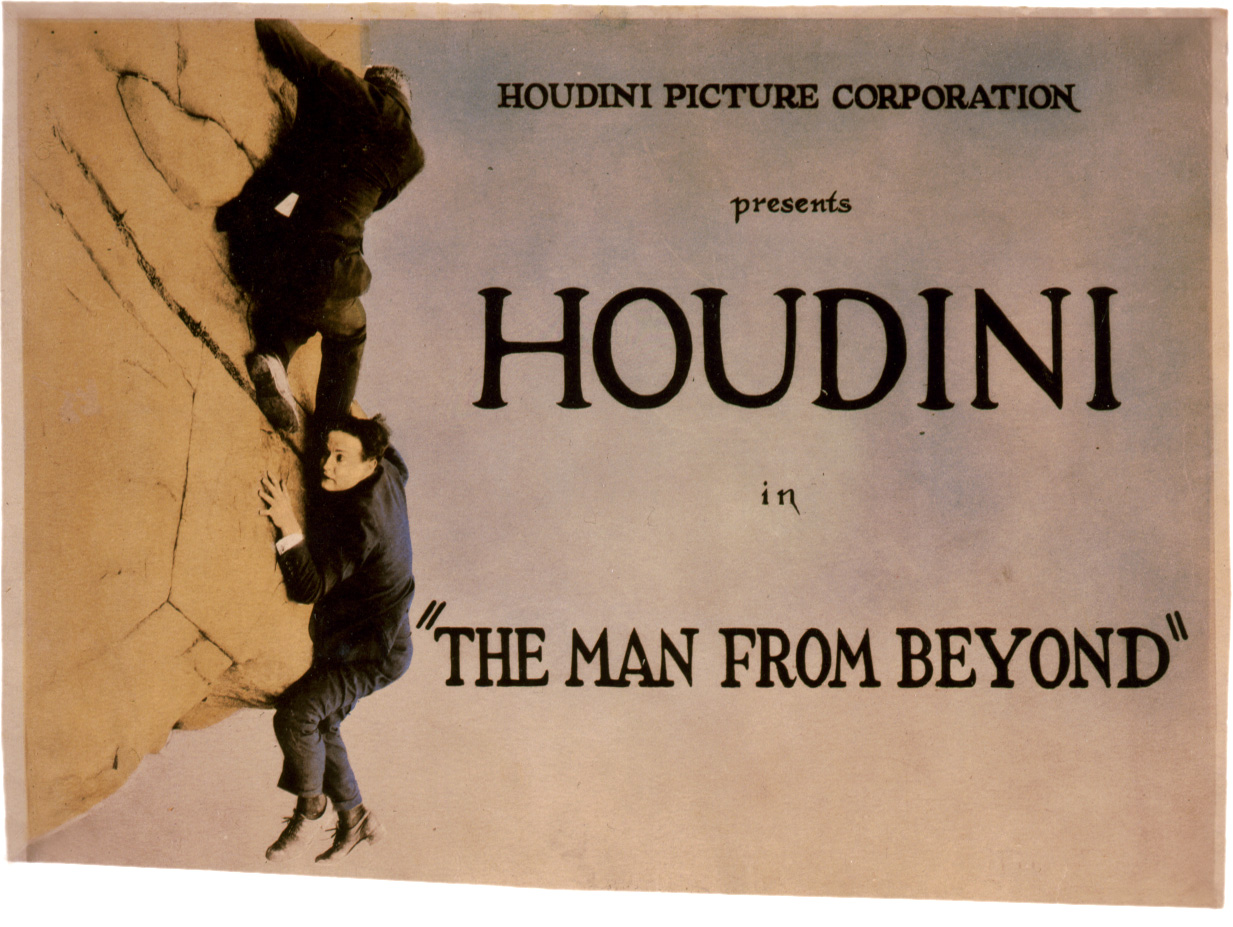
- Poster
- Directed by: Burton L. King
- Written by: Harry Houdini; Coolidge Streeter
- Story by: Harry Houdini
- Produced by: Herman Holland
- Cinematography: Harry Fischbeck
- Distributed by: Houdini Picture Corporation
- Release date: April 2, 1922
- Running time: 74 minutes
- Country: United States
- Language: Silent (English intertitles)

The Man from Beyond is a 1922 American silent mystery film starring Harry Houdini as a man found frozen in arctic ice who is brought back to life.

== Plot ==
The Man from Beyond (1922)

As described in a film magazine, scientist Dr. Gregory Sinclair (Connelly) and his fellow explorers find a man, Howard Hillary (Houdini), frozen in solid arctic ice and chop him out and then thaw him. When he returns to life, Dr. Sinclair does not tell Howard that he is 100 years behind the times, planning to study his reactions after they return to civilization. Howard tells that he loved Felice, the daughter of the captain of a ship, and there was a mutiny. In his last memory of the event, Howard was trying to save the young woman's father when he received a blow to the head. Dr. Sinclair persuades Howard not to search the snow and ice of the arctic, but to return to civilization. When Dr. Sinclair returns home, he learns that his ward's father, Dr. Crawford Strange, had set out to join him in the arctic but was lost. It is the wedding day of his ward. When Howard sees the bride, he calls out to her, calling her "Felice" and begging her to recall their love. The ward's name is Felice Strange (Connelly) and she is the reincarnation of Howard's lost sweetheart. The wedding is postponed indefinitely, and Felice begs Howard to help find her missing father. The discarded suitor, Dr. Gilbert Trent (Maude), has kidnapped her father Dr. Strange and is holding him in the cellar of his house, having planned to marry Felice and having her go with him to hunt for her father in the arctic. Howard and Dr. Sinclair stumble upon a clue, a hat with a cloth in it with Dr. Strange's initials, which leads them to rescuing him. Felice is being pursued by a hireling of Dr. Trent, and Howard follows them to the edge of the Niagara rapids. Howard swims the rapids, catches up with the canoe, and saves the young woman. Howard and Dr. Trent battle on the cliff and Trent goes over. Felice recognizes in Howard her true mate for their belated romance.

== Cast ==
- Harry Houdini as Howard Hillary / The Man from Beyond
- Arthur Maude as Dr. Gilbert Trent
- Albert Tavernier as Dr. Crawford Strange
- Erwin Connelly as Dr. Gregory Sinclair
- Frank Montgomery as Francois Duval
- Luis Alberni as Captain of the Barkentine
- Yale Benner as Milt Norcross
- Jane Connelly as Felice Strange / Felice Norcross
- Nita Naldi as Marie Le Grande

== Production ==
According to the film's press book, Burton King's directing was supposedly usurped by Houdini's "supervision," but there is little evidence that this was true. As was his habit, Houdini performed all of his own stunts.

== Houdini and Sir Arthur Conan Doyle ==
The Man from Beyond is in some ways Houdini's attempt to reconcile with his erstwhile friend, Sir Arthur Conan Doyle. Houdini befriended the English author while performing in Britain in 1920, but the two publicly disagreed about the legitimacy of spiritualism (Doyle was a fervent advocate of the supernatural while Houdini was its most famous critic). The pair had a falling out when they attended a seance in which the "spirit" of Houdini's mother (who had only spoken and understood German while alive) communicated to her son in English. By 1922, the men were no longer talking because Doyle refused to accept Houdini's criticisms of the event. The Man from Beyond ends with the words "You must believe" and the spirit of the vintage-1820 Felice entering the body of the 1922 model, a replication of the cover of Doyle's 1918 spiritual treatise, The New Revelation. Doyle praised the film and wrote:

From the opening scene showing the actual chopping of a frozen man from the center of a mass of ice and restoring him to life, to the closing scenes of the sensational rescue of the girl from the very brink of Niagra [sic?] Falls, it holds one breathless. I consider The Man from Beyond one of the really great contributions to the screen.

The film's publicity campaign subsequently used Doyle's quote in advertisements.
