= Swashbuckler film =

Subgenre of the adventure film genre

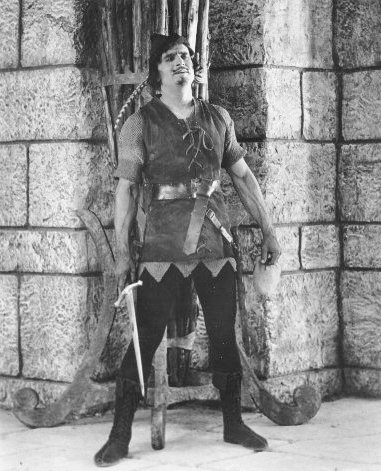
Douglas Fairbanks as Robin Hood, 1922

A swashbuckler film is characterised by swordfighting and adventurous heroic characters, known as swashbucklers. While morality is typically clear-cut, heroes and villains alike often, but not always, follow a code of honor. Some swashbuckler films have romantic elements, most frequently a damsel in distress. Both real and fictional historical events often feature prominently in the plot.

== History ==
Right from the advent of cinema, the silent era was packed with swashbucklers. The most famous of those were the films of Douglas Fairbanks, such as The Mark of Zorro (1920), which defined the genre. The stories came from romantic costume novels, particularly those of Alexandre Dumas and Rafael Sabatini. Stirring music was also an important part of the formula. The three great cycles of swashbuckler films were the Douglas Fairbanks period from 1920 to 1929; the Errol Flynn period from 1935 to 1941; and a period in the 1950s heralded by films such as Ivanhoe (1952) and The Master of Ballantrae (1953), and the popularity of the British television series The Adventures of Robin Hood (1955–1959). Richard Lester's Dumas adaptations revived the genre in the 1970s.

== Swashbucklers ==
The term "swashbuckler" originates from boisterous fighters who carried a sword and buckler (a small shield). "Swashbuckler" was a putdown, used to indicate a poor swordsman who covered his lack of skill with noise, bragging, and clamour. Novels, and then Hollywood, altered the word's connotation to make the swashbuckler the hero of the plotline.

Jeffrey Richards describes the genre as very stylized. The hero is one who "maintains a decent standard of behavior, fights for King and Country, believes in truth and justice, defends the honour of lady". Though these can be regarded as the values of a knight, the setting may fall anywhere between the 11th and 19th centuries.

== Fencing ==
Fencing is an essential element of the genre, and a dramatic duel is invariably a pivotal part of the storyline. Famous fencing instructors came from the ranks of successful competitors, and included Henry Uyttenhove, Fred Cavens, Jean Heremans, Ralph Faulkner, and Bob Anderson.

== Musical scores ==
- Erich Wolfgang Korngold won the 1938 Academy Award for his score to The Adventures of Robin Hood. The 1935 Captain Blood was nominated for Music (Scoring); in 1940 The Sea Hawk was nominated for best Original Score. Korngold was known for his late Romantic compositional style and assigning each character their own leitmotif.
- Alfred Newman wrote the scores for: The Prisoner of Zenda (1937), the 1940 version of The Mark of Zorro, and the 1942 The Black Swan (nominated for Best Original Score). The 1940 film of The Mark of Zorro was nominated for an Academy Award for the Best Original Score.
- Dimitri Tiomkin scored Cyrano de Bergerac (1950). According to film historian David Wallace, "His trademarks, huge, noisy cues, propulsive adventure themes that seemingly employed every brass instrument ever invented, and melting, emotionally wrought melodies accompanying romantic scenes also became the stock-in trade of just about every film composer since."
- Hans Zimmer scored the Pirates of the Caribbean series, reinventing the swashbuckler musical style.

== Television ==
Television followed the films.

British television production in the genre was prolific, headlined by The Adventures of Robin Hood, which produced 143 episodes by 1959 and became an outstanding success both in the United Kingdom and the United States. Other popular series included The Buccaneers (1956–1957), The Adventures of Sir Lancelot (1956–1957), Sword of Freedom (1958), The Adventures of William Tell (1958), The Adventures of the Scarlet Pimpernel (ITV, 1956), ITC's The Count of Monte Cristo (ITV, 1956), and George King's The Gay Cavalier (ITV, 1957), Quentin Durward (Studio Canal, 1971), Robin of Sherwood (ITV, 1984–1986), and Sharpe (ITV, since 1993).

American television produced two series of Zorro (1957 and 1990). Following the film The Mask of Zorro (1998), a television series about a female swashbuckler, Queen of Swords, aired in 2000.

The Spanish television series Águila Roja (Red Eagle), aired from 2009 to 2016, is an example of the swashbuckler genre.

Italian and German televisions produced several series of Sandokan.

== Notable films ==
Films with swashbuckler elements that can be considered precursors to the cinematic genre:

- The Count of Monte Cristo (1908)
- Robin Hood and His Merry Men (1912)
- The Prisoner of Zenda (1913)
- The Three Musketeers (1916)
- Kidnapped (1917)

Swashbucklers

- The Mark of Zorro (1920)
- The Three Musketeers (1921)
- Robin Hood (1922)
- The Eagle's Feather (1923)
- The Sea Hawk (1924)
- Don Q, Son of Zorro (1925)
- The Black Pirate (1926)
- The Beloved Rogue (1927)
- The Pirate of Panama (1928)
- The Iron Mask (1929)
- The Three Musketeers, film serial (1933)
- The Count of Monte Cristo (1934)
- The Scarlet Pimpernel (1934)
- Captain Blood (1935)
- The Bold Caballero (1936)
- The Prisoner of Zenda (1937)
- The Prince and The Pauper (1937)
- The Adventures of Robin Hood (1938)
- The Man in the Iron Mask (1939)
- The Sea Hawk (1940)
- The Mark of Zorro (1940)
- The Son of Monte Cristo (1940)
- Sandokan films (1941–1970)
- The Black Swan (1942)
- Captain Kidd (1945)
- The Exile (1947)
- The Pirate (1948)
- The Three Musketeers (1948)
- Adventures of Don Juan (1948)
- The Elusive Pimpernel (1950)
- The Flame and the Arrow (1950)
- Cyrano de Bergerac (1950)
- Patala Bhairavi, a Telugu film (1951)
- The Prince Who Was a Thief (1951)
- Anne of the Indies (1951)
- At Sword's Point (1952)
- Fanfan la Tulipe (1952)
- Scaramouche (1952)
- Ivanhoe (1952)
- The Crimson Pirate (1952)
- The Golden Blade (1952)
- Against All Flags (1952)
- The Prisoner of Zenda (1952)
- Blackbeard the Pirate (1952)
- The Master of Ballantrae (1953)
- Malaikkallan (1954)
- The Court Jester (1955)
- The Moonraker (1958)
- The Vikings (1958)
- Nadodi Mannan (1958)
- Mannadhi Mannan (1960)
- Cartouche (1962)
- Mandrin (1962)
- The Black Tulip (1964)
- Aayirathil Oruvan (1965)
- Haiducii (1966)
- The Testament of Aga Koppanyi (1967)
- Colonel Wolodyjowski (1969)
- Malkoçoğlu Cem Sultan (1969)
- The Devil's Servants (1970)
- Neerum Neruppum (1971)
- Tarkan Versus the Vikings (1971)
- Battal Gazi Destanı (1971)
- The Three Musketeers (1973)
- Captain Kronos – Vampire Hunter (1974)
- The Four Musketeers (1974)
- Zorro (1975)
- Robin and Marian (1976)
- Swashbuckler (1976)
- The Black Corsair (1976)
- Star Wars (1977)
- The Duellists (1977)
- Madhuraiyai Meetta Sundharapandiyan (1978)
- The Scarlet Pimpernel (1982)
- Krull (1983)
- Pirates (1986)
- The Princess Bride (1987)
- Kondaveeti Donga, a Telugu film (1990)
- Robin Hood: Prince of Thieves (1991)
- The Three Musketeers (1993)
- Cutthroat Island (1995)
- "Muppet Treasure Island" (1996)
- Le Bossu (1997)
- The Man in the Iron Mask (1998)
- The Mask of Zorro (1998)
- With Fire and Sword (1999)
- The Musketeer (2001)
- The Lord of the Rings: The Fellowship of the Ring (2001)
- The Count of Monte Cristo (2002)
- Fanfan la Tulipe (2003)
- Pirates of the Caribbean: The Curse of the Black Pearl (2003)
- Sinbad: Legend of the Seven Seas (2003)
- Master and Commander: The Far Side of the World (2003)
- Casanova (2005)
- The Legend of Zorro (2005)
- Pirates of the Caribbean: Dead Man's Chest (2006)
- Alatriste (2006)
- Pirates of the Caribbean: At World's End (2007)
- Stardust (2007)
- 1612 (2007)
- Magadheera (2009)
- Kerala Varma Pazhassi Raja (2009)
- Prince of Persia: The Sands of Time (2010)
- Pirates of the Caribbean: On Stranger Tides (2011)
- Badrinath (2011)
- The Three Musketeers (2011)
- Urumi (film) (2011)
- The Pirates! In an Adventure with Scientists! (2012)
- Queen Julia (1986)
- Baahubali: The Beginning (2015)
- Puli (2015)
- Michiel de Ruyter (film) (2015)
- Pirates of the Caribbean: Dead Men Tell No Tales (2017)
- Baahubali 2: The Conclusion (2017)
- Thugs of Hindostan (2018)
- Robin Hood (2018)
- Marakkar: Lion of the Arabian Sea (2021)
- Puss in Boots: The Last Wish (2022)
- Ponniyin Selvan: I (2022)
- Ponniyin Selvan: II (2023)
- The Three Musketeers: D'Artagnan (2023)
- The Three Musketeers: Milady (2023)
- The Count of Monte Cristo (2024 film) (2024)

== Notable actors and actresses ==
- Antonio Banderas
- Uttam Kumar
- Aamir Khan
- Amitabh Bachhan
- Lex Barker
- Gérard Barray
- Kabir Bedi
- Jean-Paul Belmondo
- Orlando Bloom
- Jim Caviezel
- Ronald Colman
- Richard Chamberlain
- Dev
- Penélope Cruz
- Prithviraj Sukumaran
- Tony Curtis
- Olivia de Havilland
- Johnny Depp
- John Derek
- Cary Elwes
- Douglas Fairbanks
- Douglas Fairbanks Jr.
- Mel Ferrer
- Mohanlal
- Ronald Colman
- Errol Flynn
- Stewart Granger
- Mithun Chakraborty
- Richard Greene
- Louis Hayward
- Keira Knightley
- Frank Latimore
- Burt Lancaster
- Jean Marais
- Georges Marchal
- Kerwin Mathews
- Ian McShane
- Viggo Mortensen
- M. N. Nambiar (Gurusami)
- Mammootty
- Maureen O'Hara
- Guy Pearce
- Vincent Perez
- Tyrone Power
- Edmund Purdom
- Rajkumar
- Kanta Rao
- Akkineni Nageswara Rao
- Sean Bean
- M. G. Ramachandran
- N. T. Rama Rao
- Basil Rathbone
- Steve Reeves
- Duncan Regehr
- Tim Roth
- Geoffrey Rush
- Tessie Santiago
- Robert Shaw
- Robert Taylor
- Richard Todd
- Raquel Welch
- Cornel Wilde
- Guy Williams
- Michael York
- Catherine Zeta-Jones

== See also ==
- List of adventure films
- List of action films
- List of genres
- Combat in film
- Samurai film
