= Mrs. Wilson =

Mrs. Wilson may refer to:

- Mrs Wilson (TV series), a British television series
- Ellen Axson Wilson, first wife of American President Woodrow Wilson
- Edith Wilson (1872–1961), second wife of American President Woodrow Wilson
- Nancy Mann Waddel Woodrow (1860s–1935), American writer, often credited as Mrs. Wilson Woodrow

== See also ==
- List of people with surname Wilson
