= The Black Pearl (1928 film) =

1928 silent film

- Directed by: Scott Pembroke
- Written by: Nancy Mann Waddel Woodrow (novel); Arthur Hoerl
- Produced by: Trem Carr
- Starring: Lila Lee; Ray Hallor; Carl Stockdale
- Cinematography: Hap Depew
- Edited by: J.S. Harrington
- Production company: Trem Carr Pictures
- Distributed by: Rayart Pictures
- Release date: December 18, 1928
- Running time: 58 minutes
- Country: United States
- Languages: Silent; English intertitles

The Black Pearl is a 1928 American silent mystery film directed by Scott Pembroke and starring Lila Lee, Ray Hallor and Carl Stockdale. It is based on a 1912 novel titled The Black Pearl by Nancy Mann Waddel Woodrow, with a plot very similar to that of Wilkie Collins' 1868 novel The Moonstone. Both novels involved a mystery around a jewel stolen from an Indian idol that carries a horrible curse.

Reviews from the time suggest this "old dark house" mystery had less humor and more suspense than most, but the film is today considered lost, so it all remains conjecture. Actress Lila Lee went on to star in the 1930 sound remake of The Unholy Three, starring Lon Chaney. Carl Stockdale, who plays the detective/hero of the film, had a long and varied career, appearing in The Vampire Bat (1933), Mad Love (1935) and Revenge of the Zombies (1936), among many other films.

== Synopsis ==
A black pearl stolen from an Indian idol is reputedly cursed. After Silas Lathrop inherits it, he receives threatening messages and is marked for death. He gathers around him all of the members of his family for the reading of his will. There follows a mystery much in the "old dark house" genre. After several murders, a detective named Bertram Chisholm solves the case.

== Cast ==
- Lila Lee as Eugenie Bromley
- Ray Hallor as Robert Lathrop
- Carl Stockdale as Ethelbert / Bertram Chisolm, the detective
- Howard Lorenz as Dr. Drake
- Adele Watson as Sarah Runyan
- Thomas A. Curran as Silas Lathrop
- Sybil Grove as Miss Sheen
- Lew Short as Eugene Bromley
- George B. French as Stephen Runyan
- Joseph Belmont as Wiggenbottom
- Art Rowlands as Claude Lathrop

== Bibliography ==
- Ken Wlaschin. Silent Mystery and Detective Movies: A Comprehensive Filmography. McFarland, 2009.
