= Buck Privates (disambiguation) =

Buck Privates is a 1941 film by Arthur Lubin.

Buck Privates may also refer to:

- Buck Privates (1928 film), a silent comedy film
- Buck Privates Come Home, a sequel to Buck Privates (1941)
