= Lingerie (film) =

1928 film

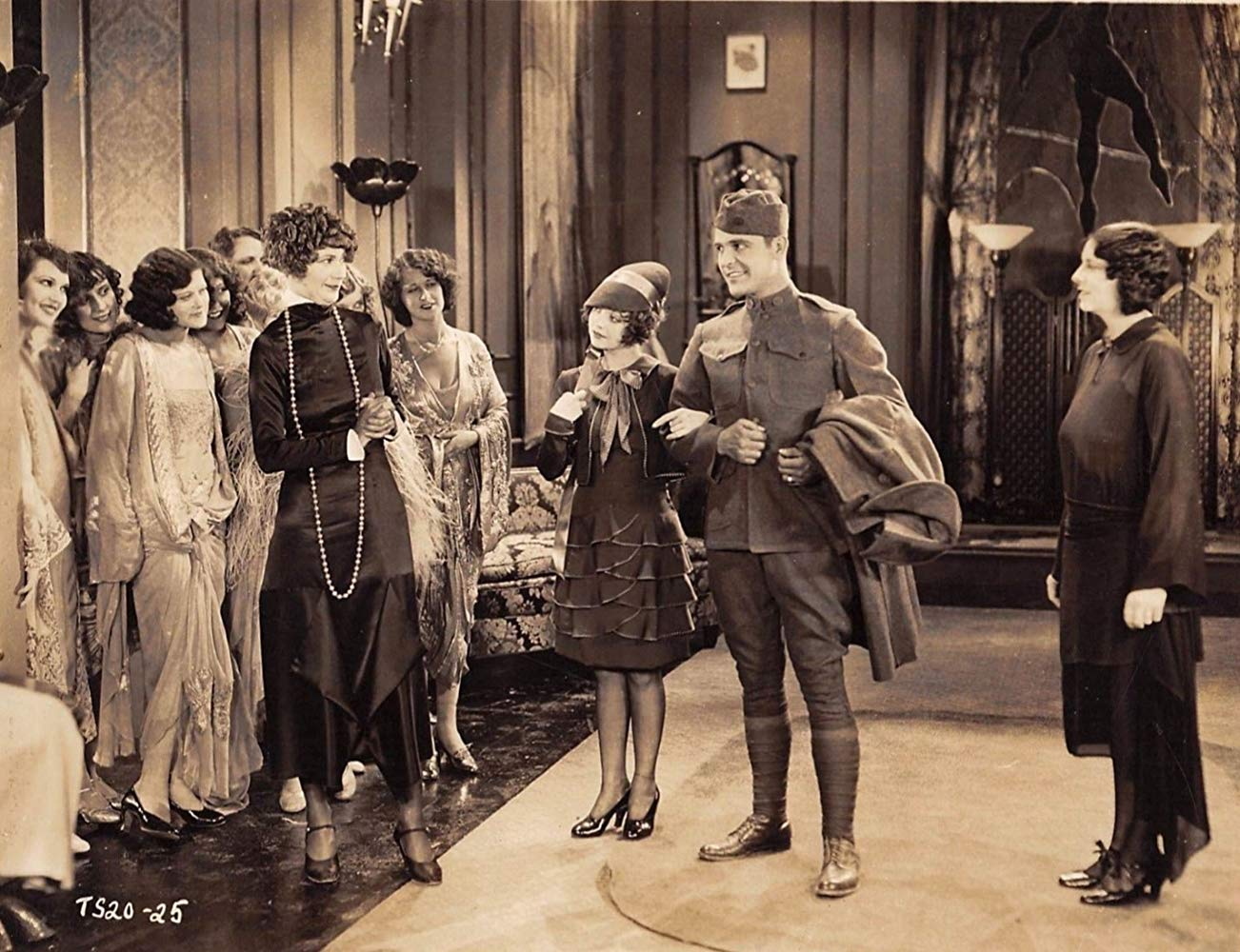
- Directed by: George Melford
- Written by: Ben Grauman Kohn; Jack Natteford
- Produced by: John M. Stahl
- Starring: Alice White; Malcolm McGregor; Mildred Harris
- Cinematography: Jackson Rose
- Edited by: Byron Robinson
- Production company: Tiffany-Stahl Productions
- Distributed by: Tiffany Pictures
- Release date: July 1, 1928
- Running time: 63 minutes
- Country: United States
- Languages: Silent; English intertitles

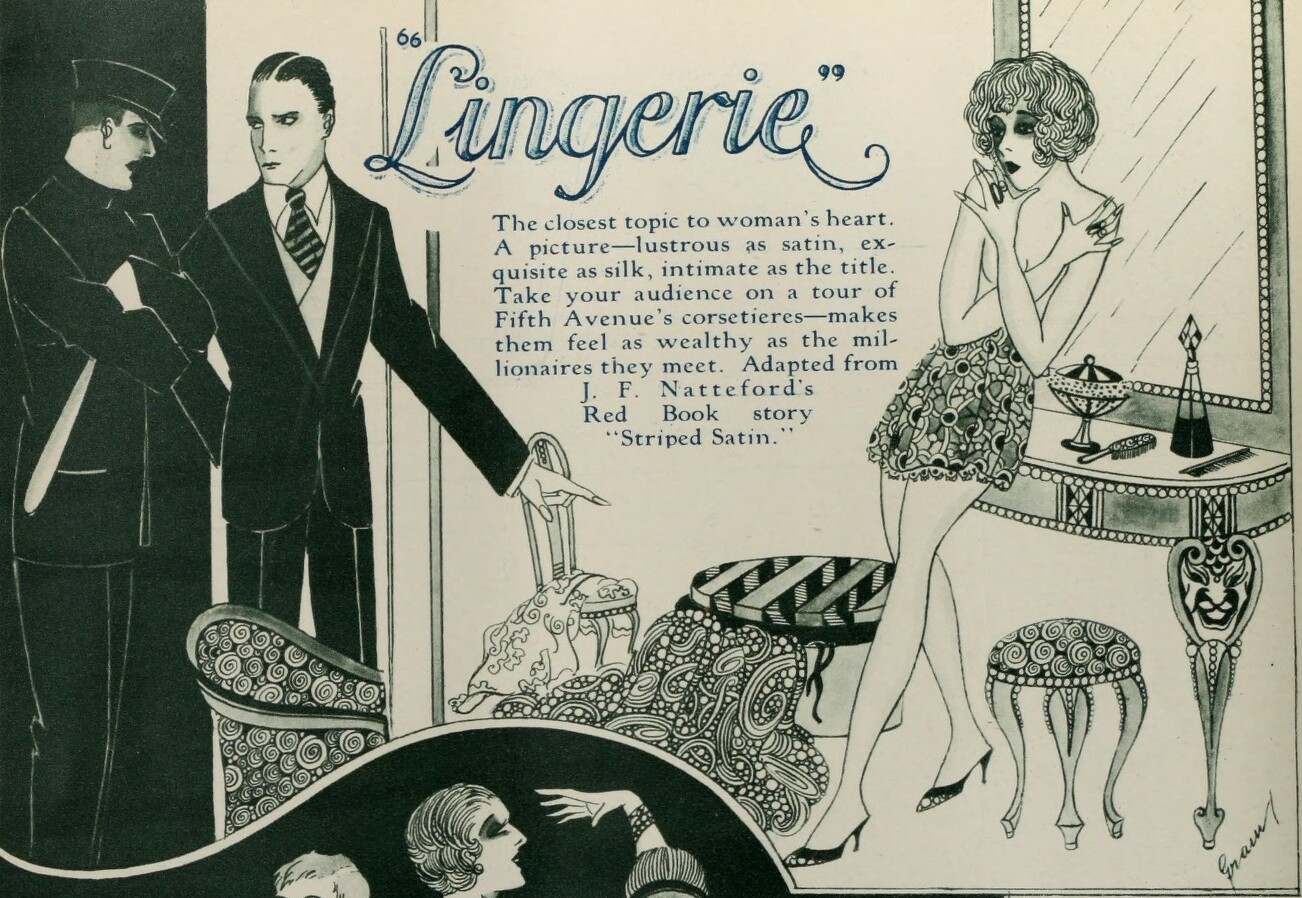
Lingerie advertisement in The Film Daily on July 18, 1927

Lingerie is a 1928 American silent war drama film directed by George Melford and starring Alice White, Malcolm McGregor and Mildred Harris. Copies of the film still survive.

== Synopsis ==
While serving in World War I, an American soldier meets a young woman in Paris. Eventually realizing he is closer to her than his cheating wife, he marries her.

== Cast ==
- Alice White as Angele Ree ('Lingerie')
- Malcolm McGregor as Leroy Boyd
- Mildred Harris as Mary
- Armand Kaliz as Jack Van Cleeve
- Cornelia Kellogg as Mary's Mother
- Kit Guard as Leroy's Buddy
- Victor Potel as Leroy's Buddy
- Richard Carlyle as Pembrokee
- Marcelle Corday as Modiste

== Bibliography ==
- Munden, Kenneth White. The American Film Institute Catalog of Motion Pictures Produced in the United States, Part 1. University of California Press, 1997.
