= Driven from Home =

1927 film

- Directed by: James Young
- Written by: Hal Reid (play); Enid Hibbard; Ethel Hill
- Produced by: Jesse J. Goldburg[I.E. Chadwick
- Starring: Ray Hallor; Virginia Lee Corbin; Pauline Garon
- Cinematography: Ernest Miller
- Production company: Chadwick Pictures
- Distributed by: Chadwick Pictures; Butcher's Film Service (UK)
- Release date: January 15, 1927
- Running time: 70 minutes
- Country: United States
- Languages: Silent; English intertitles

Driven from Home is a 1927 American silent drama film directed by James Young and starring Ray Hallor, Virginia Lee Corbin and Pauline Garon. A print is preserved at the Cinematek film archive.

== Cast ==
- Ray Hallor
- Virginia Lee Corbin
- Pauline Garon
- Sôjin Kamiyama
- Anna May Wong
- Melbourne MacDowell
- Margaret Seddon
- Sheldon Lewis
- Virginia Pearson
- Eric Mayne
- Alfred Fisher

== Bibliography ==
- Munden, Kenneth White. The American Film Institute Catalog of Motion Pictures Produced in the United States, Part 1. University of California Press, 1997.
