= Ray Hallor =

American actor (1900–1944)

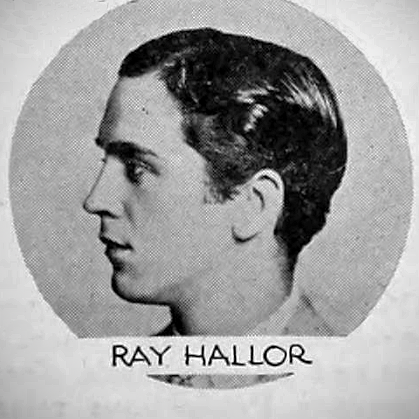
- Hallor in 1926
- Born: January 11, 1900; Washington, D.C., U.S.
- Died: April 16, 1944 (aged 44); Palm Springs, California, U.S.
- Occupation: Actor
- Years active: 1917–1932

Ray Hallor (January 11, 1900 – April 16, 1944) was an actor in films in the United States.

== Biography ==
Born in Washington, D.C., actresses Edith Hallor (1896–1971) and Ethel Hallor (1892–1982) were his siblings.

Hallor began working in films with Edison Studios in 1915. He starred in the 1927 film Driven from Home. He also acted on stage in a Gus Edwards revue.

He was killed in a head-on automobile collision in Palm Springs, California, on April 16, 1944.

== Partial filmography ==
- Kidnapped (1917)
- An Amateur Orphan (1917)
- Blackbirds (1920) credited as assistant director
- The Dangerous Maid (1923)
- The Circus Cowboy (1924)
- Learning to Love (1925)
- Sally (1925)
- The Storm Breaker (1925)
- The Last Edition (1925)
- Red Dice (1926)
- The High Flyer (1926)
- It Must Be Love (1926)
- Driven from Home (1927)
- Man Crazy (1927)
- The Haunted Ship (1927)
- Tongues of Scandal (1927)
- Quarantined Rivals (1927)
- Nameless Men (1928)
- The Trail of '98 (1928)
- The Avenging Shadow (1928)
- Thundergod (1928)
- Green Grass Widows (1928)
- Manhattan Knights (1928)
- Black Butterflies (1928)
- Tropical Nights (1928)
- The Black Pearl (1928)
- Noisy Neighbors (1929)
- In Old California (1929)
- Circumstantial Evidence (1929)
- Fast Life (1929)
- Hidden Valley (1932)
