= The Circle (1925 film) =

1925 film

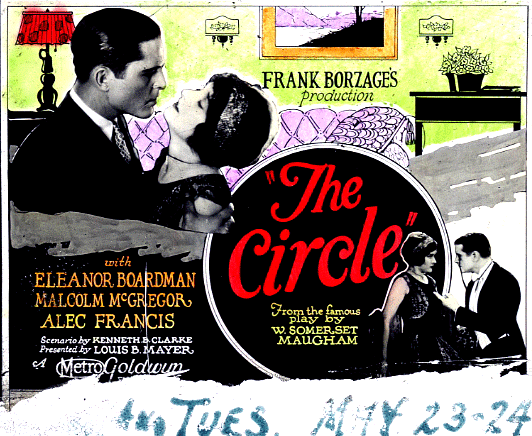
- Lantern slide
- Directed by: Frank Borzage
- Written by: Kenneth B. Clarke
- Based on: The Circle; 1921 play by W. Somerset Maugham
- Produced by: Frank Borzage
- Starring: Eleanor Boardman; Malcolm McGregor; Alec B. Francis; Eugenie Besserer; Joan Crawford
- Cinematography: Chester A. Lyons
- Distributed by: Metro-Goldwyn-Mayer
- Release date: September 22, 1925
- Running time: 60 minutes
- Country: United States
- Language: Silent (English intertitles)

The Circle is a 1925 American silent romantic comedy film directed by Frank Borzage. The film stars Eleanor Boardman, Malcolm McGregor, and Alec B. Francis. A young Joan Crawford (whose name was changed that year from Lucille LeSueur through a contest run by the studio) appears in the film's opening scene and later in a photograph viewed by other characters. The screenplay, written by Kenneth B. Clarke, was based on the 1921 play of the same title by W. Somerset Maugham.

The play was filmed again by MGM as an early sound release (also released in a silent version) in 1930 as Strictly Unconventional.

== Plot ==
In the 1890s, young Lady Catherine decides to leave her husband, Lord Clive Cheney, and her son Arnold in favor of her lover, "Hughie" Porteous. Thirty years later, young Elizabeth Cheney is facing the same choice between her husband, the now grown Arnold, and her lover, Teddy Luton. Before going off with Teddy, however, Elizabeth wants to know how the love match between Catherine and Hughie has worked out, so she has invited them to the house while Arnold's now-aged father, Lord Clive, is away on a hunting trip. Scenes of Catherine and Hughie driving toward the house, with only the backs of their heads visible, are intercut.

The prim and fussy Arnold is nervous about the impending visit, but when Lord Clive returns to the house unexpectedly just before Catherine and Hughie arrive, the older man does not seem at all upset by their arrival. The former young lovers have not aged well. Catherine is flighty, trying to maintain a façade of youth, and Hugh is fat and cranky. Although the two bicker and complain during their visit, Elizabeth sees that they still have a strong bond of affection after thirty years together, and she vows to seek happiness with Teddy instead of the dull safety of marriage with Arnold.

Arnold (as well as Clive and the house butler) is aware that Elizabeth may elope with Teddy and seeks his father's advice. Clive cautions his son against acting too impetuously. Encountering Elizabeth, Arnold fails to offer a passionate response to her possible departure from his life. When Elizabeth asks Teddy how he would react if another man tried to take her he away, he says that he would blacken one of her eyes and close the other, which convinces her of Teddy's passion as Arnold watches, unseen by the two.

Clive talks with Hughie, believing that he has helped to save Arnold's marriage, unaware that Elizabeth and Teddy have driven away in a chauffeured car. The two try to kiss on the bumpy drive without being watched by the driver, who is wearing a cap and driver's goggles. When the car seems to break down, the chauffeur reveals himself to be Arnold. He tells Teddy that he will blacken one of his eyes and close the other, and punches his rival. He then forces Elizabeth back in the car and returns to the house. After dinner, Arnold tells Elizabeth that it is time for bed. Outside the bedroom, he loosens his robe and strides in, closing the door. Meanwhile, Clive and Hughie, unaware of all of these developments, simply think that the foolishness of youth has been averted and break down in laughter with each other.

This ending is a distinct change from Maugham's play, which ends with Teddy and Elizabeth happily running off together.

== Cast ==
- Eleanor Boardman as Elizabeth Cheney
- Malcolm McGregor as Edward "Teddy" Lutton
- Alec B. Francis as Lord Clive Cheney
  - Derek Glynne as Young Clive Cheney
- Eugenie Besserer as Lady Catherine "Kitty" Cheney
  - Joan Crawford as Young Lady Catherine
- George Fawcett as Lord Hugh "Hughie" Porteous
  - Frank Braidwood as Young Porteous
- Creighton Hale as Arnold Cheney
  - Buddy Smith as Young Arnold
- Otto Hoffman as Dorker
- Eulalie Jensen as Mrs. Alice Shenstone

== Archival copy and home media ==
A 35mm print of the film survives today at the George Eastman Museum. A DVD of it was released by Warner Home Video.
