= The Storm Breaker =

1925 film

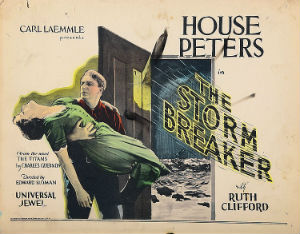
- Theatrical release poster
- Directed by: Edward Sloman
- Screenplay by: Edward T. Lowe Jr.
- Based on: Titans by Charles Guernon
- Starring: House Peters Sr. Ruth Clifford; Nina Romano; Ray Hallor; Jere Austin; Lionel Belmore
- Cinematography: Jackson Rose
- Production company: Universal Pictures
- Distributed by: Universal Pictures
- Release date: October 25, 1925
- Running time: 70 minutes
- Country: United States
- Language: Silent (English intertitles)

The Storm Breaker is a 1925 American silent drama film directed by Edward Sloman and written by Edward T. Lowe Jr. It is based on the 1922 novel Titans by Charles Guernon. The film stars House Peters Sr., Ruth Clifford, Nina Romano, Ray Hallor, Jere Austin, and Lionel Belmore. The film was released on October 25, 1925, by Universal Pictures.

== Plot ==
As described in a film magazine review, John Strong, a dominatingly strong willed fisherman who is loved by a young woman who lives in his mother's home meets and marries the daughter of a bookseller, but then loses her love to his brother Neil. One night a storm wrecks his brother's boat. He refuses to go to the rescue until he is told that he is the only man on the coast who can save the one who is in peril. Following the successful rescue of his brother, he realizes he has no right to the love of the woman he has wed. He leaves the village, but not before he learns that the young woman who adored him before he was married will await his return.

== Cast ==
- House Peters Sr. as John Strong
- Ruth Clifford as Lysette DeJon
- Nina Romano as Judith Nyte
- Ray Hallor as Neil Strong
- Jere Austin as Tom North
- Lionel Belmore as Parson
- Gertrude Claire as Elspeth Strong
- Mark Fenton as Malcolm

== Preservation ==
A print of The Storm Breaker is preserved at EYE film Institut, aka Filmmuseum, Netherlands.
