= The Circus Cowboy =

1924 film

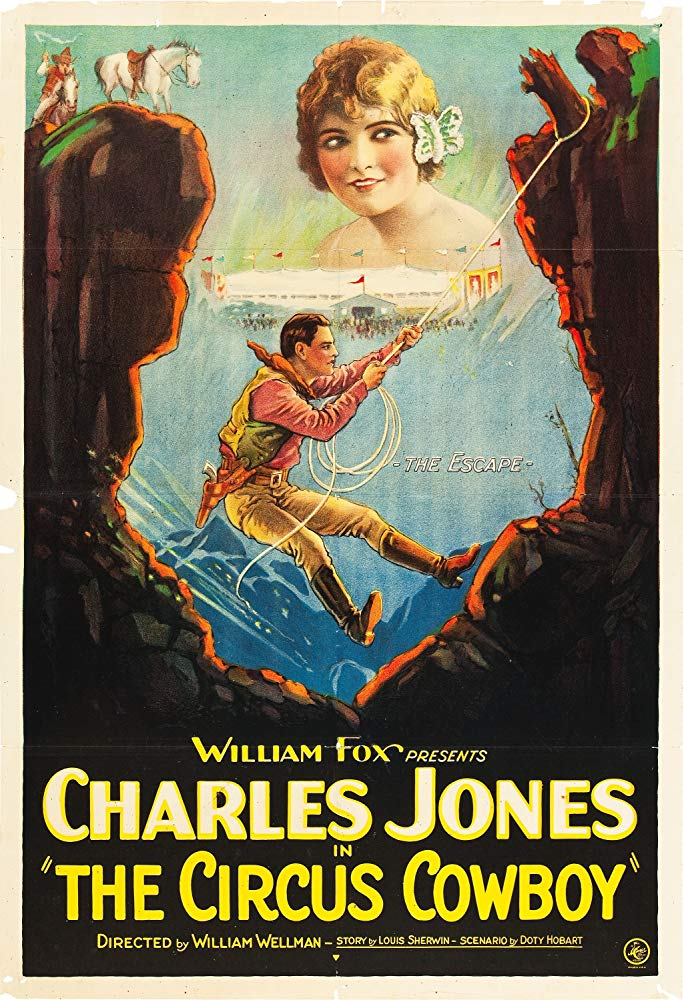
- Theatrical release poster
- Directed by: William A. Wellman
- Written by: Doty Hobart
- Story by: Louis Sherwin
- Produced by: William Fox
- Starring: Buck Jones
- Cinematography: Joseph Brotherton
- Production company: Fox Film Corporation
- Distributed by: Fox Film Corporation
- Release date: May 11, 1924
- Running time: 50 minutes
- Country: United States
- Language: Silent (English intertitles)

The Circus Cowboy is a lost 1924 American silent Western film directed by William A. Wellman and produced and distributed by Fox Film Corporation.

== Plot ==
As described in a film magazine review, returning home from Africa, Buck Saxon finds that his sweetheart, Norma Wallace, is married to Ezra Bagley, a wealthy miser. Buck interferes to save Norma when her stepson Paul threatens her. When the younger Bagley is shot and killed by the father in mistake for Buck, Buck gets the blame. Escaping, he joins a circus where Bird Taylor, a young woman who loves him, works as a tightrope walker. Buck entertains the public by performing riding feats. An animal trainer is jealous of Buck, and cuts the rope while Bird Taylor is doing her stuff in the air. Buck spoils this little game by catching Bird expertly as she is hurdling to the floor. Ezra Bagley tacks down Buck but is finally forced to admit the truth regarding the slaying of his son. Vindicated, Buck weds Bird.

== Cast ==
- Buck Jones as Buck Saxon (credited as Charles Jones)
- Marian Nixon as Bird Taylor
- Jack McDonald as Ezra Bagley
- Ray Hallor as Paul Bagley
- Marguerite Clayton as Norma Wallace
- George Romain as Slovini

== Preservation ==
With no prints of The Circus Cowboy located in any film archives, it is a lost film.
