= Money to Burn (1926 film) =

1926 film

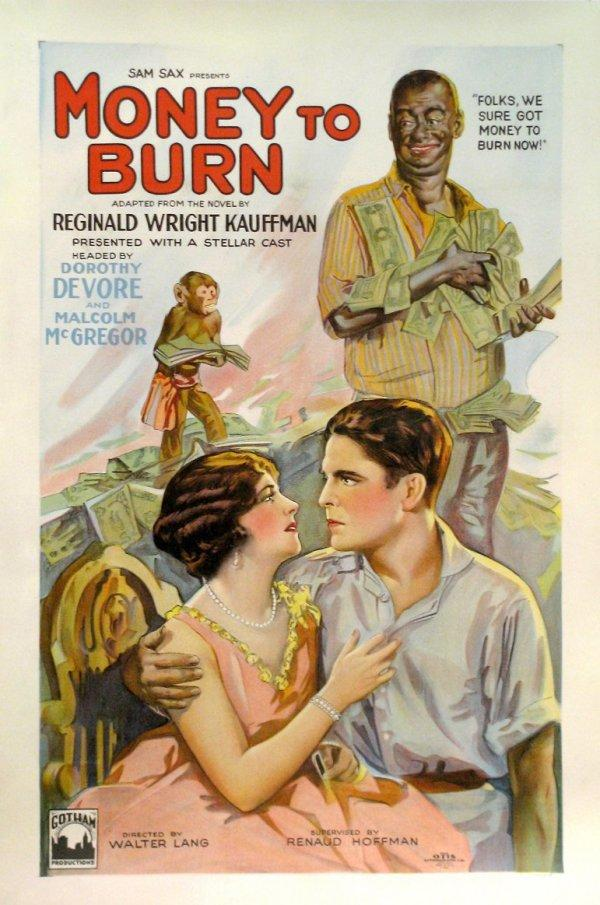
- Film poster
- Directed by: Walter Lang
- Written by: Reginald Wright Kauffman; James Bell Smith
- Produced by: Samuel Sax
- Starring: Malcolm McGregor
- Cinematography: Ray June
- Production company: Gotham Pictures
- Distributed by: Lumas Film Corporation
- Release date: December 6, 1926
- Running time: 66 minutes
- Country: United States
- Language: Silent (English intertitles)

Money to Burn is a 1926 American silent drama film directed by Walter Lang.

== Plot ==
As described in a film magazine review, Dolores Valdez, an attractive young woman returning home from college by ship, meets and falls in love with the ship's doctor, Dan Stone. Upon arrival, Dolores discovers an atmosphere of mystery about the home and in the actions of her guardian, Don Diego Valdez, whose relations with Manuel Ortego are of a shady nature. Dolores is forbidden to enter the old chapel. Dan, escaping from his ship after a row in which he believes that he has killed a man, seeks shelter on the island on which Dolores lives and is held captive by Ortego. Meanwhile, Ortego and Don Diego force Dolores to agree to a marriage with the former. Everything comes to a climax when Dan escapes and discovers that Ortego and Don Diego have set up a counterfeiting operation in the old chapel. Dan arrives in time to stop the wedding, and the fight that follows ends when the U.S. Marines arrive. Dan and Dolores then sail for the United States.

== Cast ==
- Malcolm McGregor as Dan Stone
- Dorothy Devore as Dolores Valdez
- Eric Mayne as Don Diego Valdez
- Nina Romano as Maria González
- George Chesebro as Manuel Ortego
- Orfa Casanova as Señora Sanguinetti
- Jules Cowles as The Giant
- John T. Prince as Bascom
- Arnold Melvin as The Mysterious Native

== Preservation ==
The film survives in the archives of the Library of Congress and the Museum of Modern Art.
