= Murder Will Out (1930 film) =

1930 film

- Theatrical release poster
- Directed by: Clarence Badger
- Written by: J. Grubb Alexander (adaptation & dialogue)
- Based on: "The Purple Hieroglyph" (1920 short story) by Will F. Jenkins (Murray Leinster)
- Starring: Jack Mulhall; Lila Lee
- Cinematography: John F. Seitz
- Music by: Alois Reiser
- Production company: First National Pictures
- Distributed by: First National Pictures
- Release date: April 6, 1930
- Running time: 67 minutes
- Country: United States
- Language: English

Murder Will Out is a 1930 American pre-Code mystery film with songs produced and released by First National Pictures and directed by Clarence G. Badger. The movie stars Jack Mulhall, Lila Lee and features Noah Beery and Malcolm McGregor. The film was based on the short story The Purple Hieroglyph by Murray Leinster writing as Will F. Jenkins, which was published in Snappy Stories on March 1, 1920.

== Plot ==
Leonard Staunton, a young wealthy New York club-man is engaged to Jeanne Baldwin, daughter of a U.S. Senator. Mulhall is preparing to spend a weekend at the Senator's estate. He becomes involved in the affairs of a gang of blackmailers through his efforts to help a fellow club member. When Alan Fitzhugh, a fellow club-member, arrives with a note, imprinted with a purple hieroglyph, in which he, Fitzhugh, is threatened with a horrible death. Since Fitzhugh is nervous and terrified, Leonard agrees to stay with him at his apartment that night.

A little after midnight, Fitzhugh finally recovers his nerve and Leonard takes a cab home. The next day a body, terribly mutilated beyond recognition is found. Following the funeral, Dr. Mansfield, accidentally smokes a poisoned cigarette. Leonard, Jeanne, and Lt. Condon, who claims to be in the secret service, take Dr. Mansfield to his home for an antidote. While searching for the antidote, Mansfield's body disappears. While they search for his body, they find footprints that lead to a slipper, inside of which they find another note with a purple hieroglyph.

Numerous other blackmail threats follow, demanding money from Leonard. While at a Chinese garden party, Jeanne is kidnapped and a ransom is demanded from Leonard for her return. While on his way to pay the ransom, Leonard is captured by the blackmailers in a speedboat, but a United States submarine rescues both Leonard and Jeanne. The criminals turn out to be none other than Alan, Dr. Mansfield, and Lt. Condon, who concocted the scheme to get money from Leonard.

== Cast ==
- Jack Mulhall as Leonard Staunton
- Lila Lee as Jeanne Baldwin
- Noah Beery as Lieutenant Condon
- Malcolm McGregor as Jack Baldwin
- Tully Marshall as Dr. Mansfield
- Alec B. Francis as Senator Baldwin
- Hedda Hopper as Aunt Pat
- Claud Allister as Alan Fitzhugh

== Songs ==
The Chinese garden party sequence included a musical sequence featuring a song and exotic dance.

== Preservation status ==
This film is now considered a lost film, with no film elements known to exist. The soundtrack, which was recorded on Vitaphone disks, may survive in private hands.

== See also ==
- List of lost films
