= Malcolm McGregor =

American actor

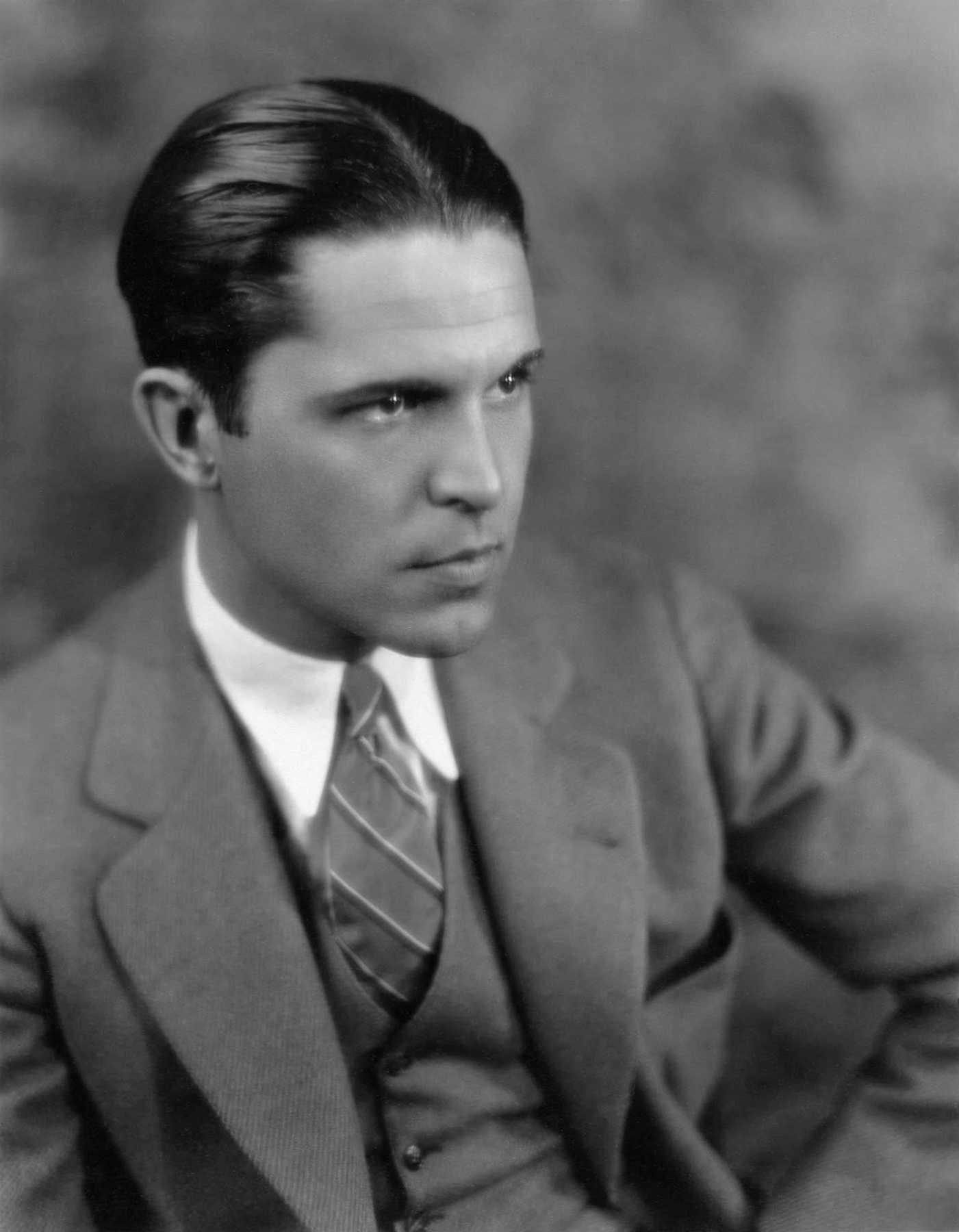
- McGregor in Lady of the Night (1925)
- Born: October 13, 1892; Newark, New Jersey, United States
- Died: April 29, 1945 (aged 52); Hollywood, California, United States
- Occupation: Actor
- Years active: 1922-1936

Malcolm McGregor (October 13, 1892 – April 29, 1945) was an American actor of the silent era. McGregor appeared in more than 50 films between 1922 and 1936. He was born in Newark, New Jersey and died in Hollywood, California.

McGregor starred as the young whaling captain in the 1923 film version of Ben Ames Williams' All the Brothers Were Valiant, perhaps the highlight of a busy career that mostly found the handsome, clean-cut actor supporting such glamorous female stars as Corinne Griffith, Florence Vidor, and Evelyn Brent. Like so many of his contemporaries, McGregor's career quickly waned after the changeover to sound and he was reduced to playing second fiddle to Bela Lugosi in the 1932 Mascot serial The Whispering Shadow. McGregor retired after playing a gangster in a low-budget screen version of radio's Special Agent K-7 (1937). McGregor reportedly died from burns suffered in an accident in his home in Hollywood at the age of 52.

== Partial filmography ==
- The Prisoner of Zenda (1922) - Captain Fritz von Tarlenheim
- Broken Chains (1922) - Peter Wyndham
- All the Brothers Were Valiant (1923) - Joel Shore
- Can a Woman Love Twice? (1923) - Abner's Son
- The Untameable (1923) - Chester Arnold
- The Dancer of the Nile (1923) - Karmet
- The Social Code (1923) - Dean Cardigan
- A Noise in Newboro (1923) - Harry Dixon
- The Bedroom Window (1924) - Frank Armstrong
- The House of Youth (1924) - Spike Blaine
- You Can't Get Away with It (1924) - Henry Adams
- Idle Tongues (1924) - Tom Stone
- Smouldering Fires (1925) - Robert Elliott
- The Girl of Gold (1925) - Schuyler Livingstone
- Lady of the Night (1925) - David Page
- Alias Mary Flynn (1925) - Tim Reagan
- The Happy Warrior (1925) - Ralph
- The Overland Limited (1925) - David Barton
- Headlines (1925) - Lawrence Emmett
- The Circle (1925) - Edward 'Teddy' Luton
- The Vanishing American (1925) - Earl Ramsdale
- Flaming Waters (1925) - Dan O'Neil
- Infatuation (1925) - Ronald Perry
- It Must Be Love (1926) - Jack Dugan
- Don Juan's Three Nights (1926) - Giulio Roberti
- The Gay Deceiver (1926) - Robert Le Rivarol
- The Silent Flyer (1926) - Lloyd Darrell, posing as Bill Smith
- Money to Burn (1926) - Dan Stone
- The Wreck (1927)
- The Price of Honor (1927) - Anthony Fielding
- The Ladybird (1927) - Duncan Spencer
- Matinee Ladies (1927) - Bob Ward
- A Million Bid (1927) - Dr. Robert Brent
- The Kid Sister (1927) - Thomas Webster
- The Girl from Gay Paree (1927) - Kenneth Ward
- Buck Privates (1928) - John Smith
- The Port of Missing Girls (1928) - Buddie Larkins
- Stormy Waters (1928) - Davis Steele
- Lingerie (1928) - Leroy Boyd
- Freedom of the Press (1928) - Bill Ballard
- Tropical Nights (1928) - Jim
- Girl on the Barge (1929) - Fogarty
- Whispering Winds (1929) - Jim
- Murder Will Out (1930) - Jack Baldwin
- The Whispering Shadow (1933) - Jack Foster
- Car 99 (1935) - Pilot at Restaurant (uncredited)
- People Will Talk (1935) - Harriet's Boy Friend (uncredited)
- China Seas (1935) - Atkins - Dock Manager (uncredited)
- Diamond Jim (1935) - Man at Racetrack (uncredited)
- Happiness C.O.D. (1935) - Jim Martin
- I'll Name the Murderer (1936) - Ted Benson
- The Reckless Way (1936) - Don Reynolds
- Special Agent K-7 (1936) - Silky Samuels
- Undersea Kingdom (1936) - Zogg
