= Nina Romano =

American actress

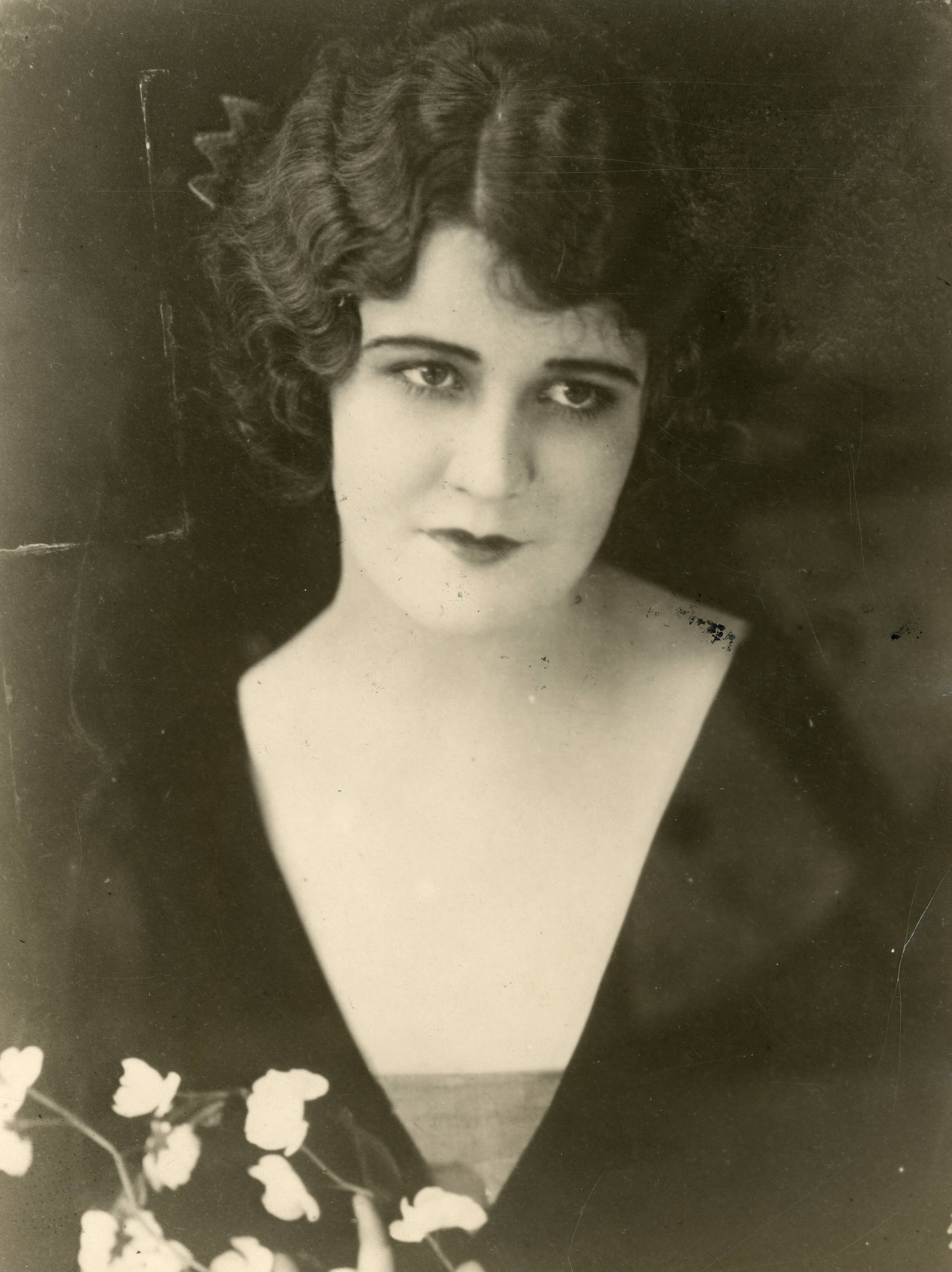
- Born: Isabel Craven Dilworth; October 18, 1901; Salem, New Jersey, U.S.
- Died: October 15, 1966 (aged 64); Granada Hills, Los Angeles, California, U.S.
- Occupation: Actress
- Spouse(s): Lou Tellegen (1923-1928, divorce); Count S. Danneskiold-Samsøe (1931-?)

Nina Romano (born Isabel Craven Dilworth; October 18, 1901 - 15 October 15, 1966) was an American actress in films and on stage.

== Early years ==
Born in Salem, New Jersey, Romano was the daughter of glass manufacturer John Dale Dilworth and his wife, the former Letitia Hamill Craven. Her interest in acting developed while she was in high school at Ward–Belmont College in Nashville, and she went on to attend a dramatic school in New York.

== Career ==
Romano's initial professional acting experience came in a stage production of Don Juan. She initially focused on dramatic roles, but in 1924 she had her first comedic role in the farce The Whole Town's Talking. Her Broadway credits included The Love Call (1927) and The Warrior's Husband (1932).

After being a leading woman on stage for years, Romano made her screen debut in the film Titans for Universal Pictures. That work led to her signing a long-term contract with Universal in 1925. Her other films included The Palace of Pleasure (1926), What Happened to Jones (1926), and Lost at the Front (1927).

== Personal life and death ==
On December 17, 1923, Romano married Lou Tellegen in Rutherford, New Jersey. Tellegen was an actor with whom Romano had performed in Blind Youth. The couple kept the marriage secret until February 1925, when their son was born. On August 30, 1928, Tellegen and Romano filed for bankruptcy, and in November 1928 the couple was divorced in Los Angeles.

On October 24, 1931, Romano married Count Sophus Danneskiold-Samsøe, of Denmark. The two later divorced, with Romano suing the count in 1955 to recover $171,000 that she said she had advanced to him.

On October 15, 1966, three days before her 65th birthday, Romano died at Cravenskiold Farm in Granada Hills, California, of undisclosed causes. She was buried near Saugus, California.

== Filmography ==
- The Storm Breaker (1925)
- The Palace of Pleasure (1926)
- What Happened to Jones (1926)
- The Midnight Sun (1926)
- Money to Burn (1926)
- Lost at the Front (1927)
- Her Husband's Women (1929)
