= Hidden Fires (1918 film) =

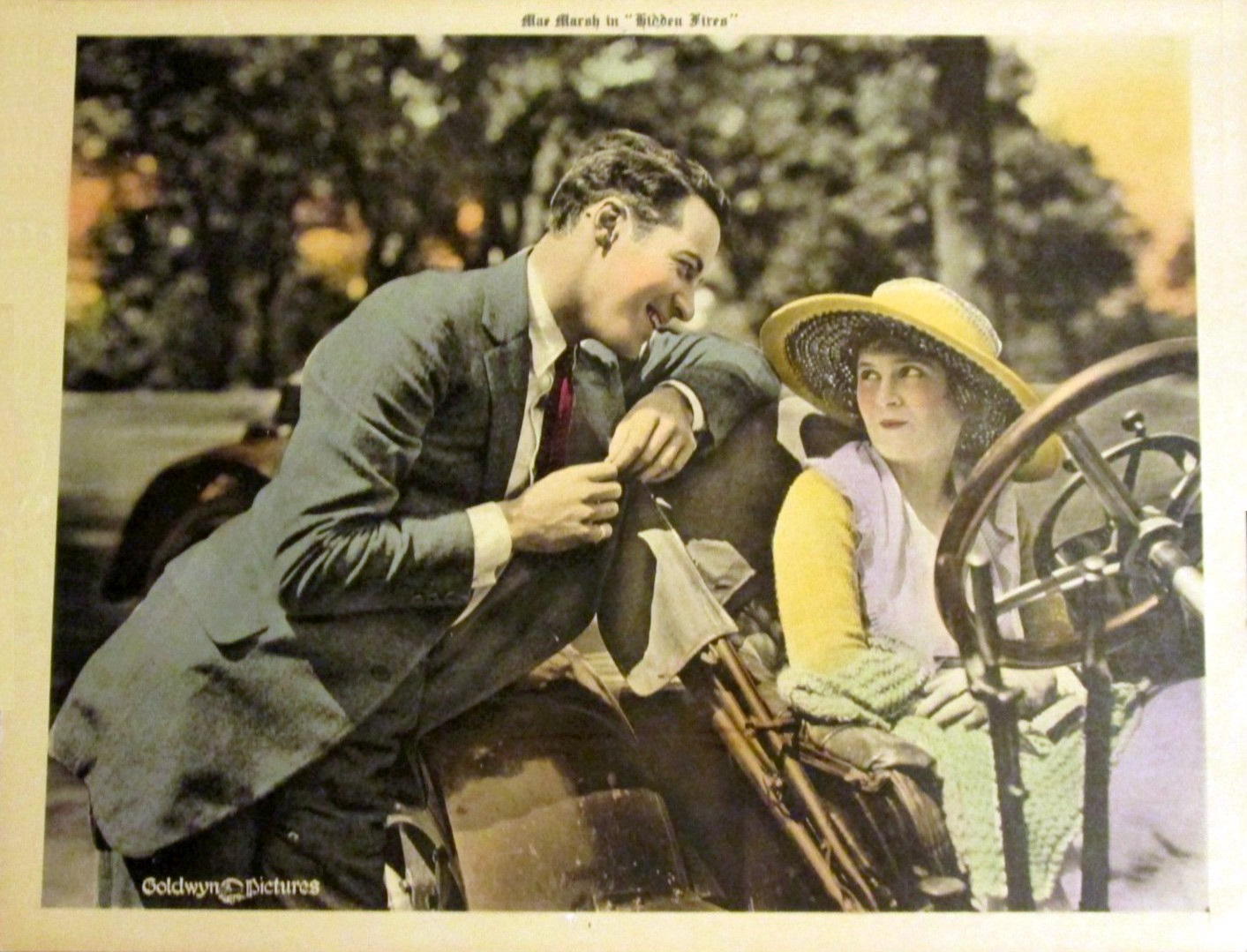
- Rod La Rocque and Mae Marsh
- Directed by: George Irving
- Written by: J. Clarkson Miller
- Produced by: Samuel Goldwyn
- Starring: Mae Marsh; Rod La Rocque
- Cinematography: Oliver T. Marsh
- Distributed by: Goldwyn Pictures
- Release date: October 7, 1918
- Running time: 50 minutes
- Country: USA
- Language: Silent...English titles

Hidden Fires is a lost 1918 silent film drama directed by George Irving and starring Mae Marsh and Rod La Rocque. It was produced and distributed by Goldwyn Pictures.

== Cast ==
- Mae Marsh - Peggy Murray/Louise Parke
- Rod La Rocque - George Landis
- Florida Kingsley - Mrs. Treadway Parke
- Alec B. Francis - Dr. Granville
- Jere Austin - Stephen Underwood
