= Jere Austin =

American actor

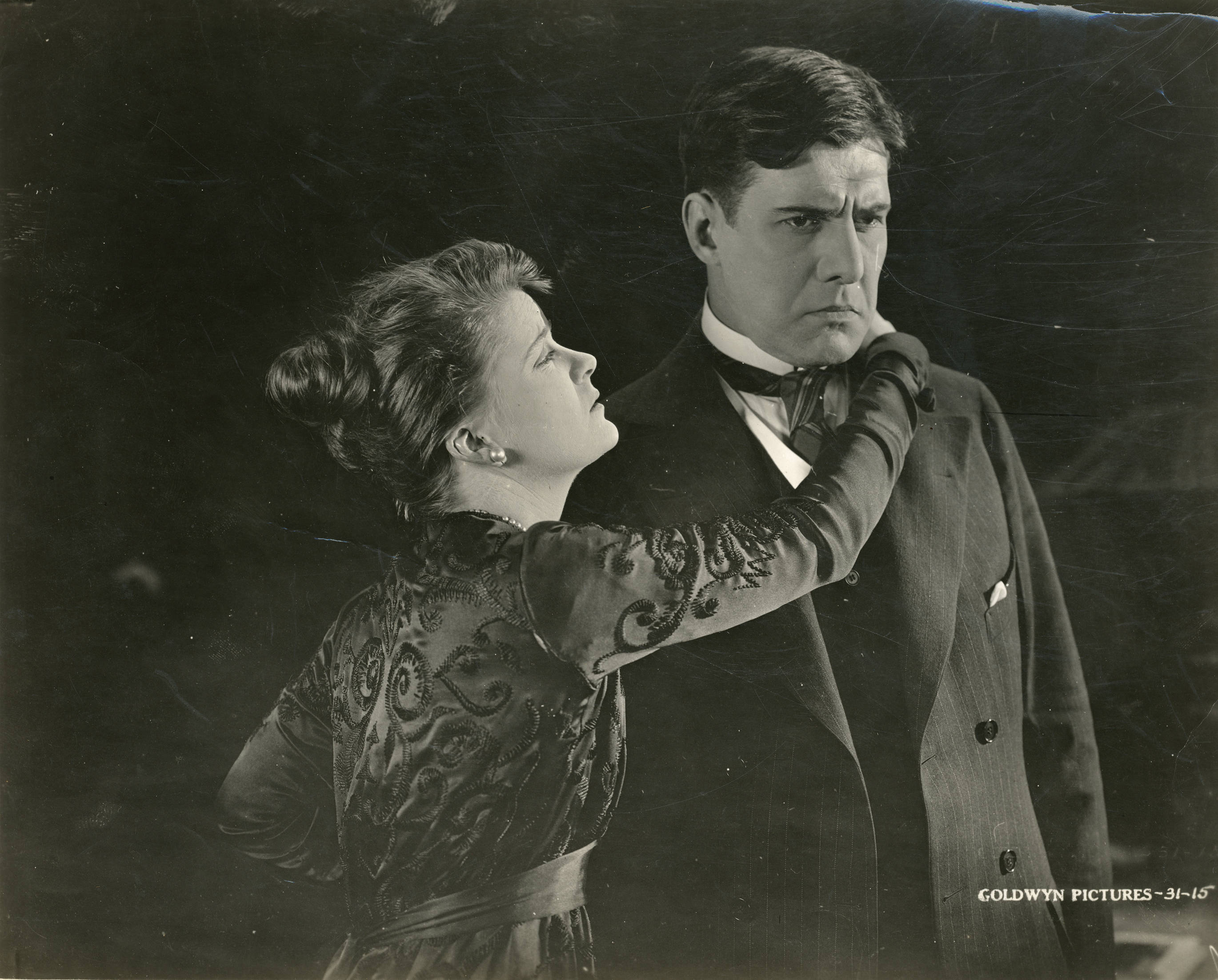
- Mae Marsh with Austin in Hidden Fires (1918)
- Born: John Van Akin Austin; March 24, 1876; Minneapolis, Minnesota, US
- Died: November 12, 1927 (aged 51); Los Angeles, California, US
- Resting place: Hollywood Forever Cemetery, Hollywood, California (Los Angeles County)
- Other name: Jerry Austin
- Occupation: actor

Jere Austin (born John Van Akin Austin; March 24, 1876 – November 12, 1927) was an American silent film actor from Minnesota. He began in appearing in films in 1914, and made his last appearance in Cecil B. DeMille's King of Kings (1927). Austin had entered films with the Kalem Company.

Austin died of cancer in Los Angeles, California in 1927, aged 51.

== Filmography ==
- Chest of Fortune (1914) short
- Wolfe; Or, The Conquest of Quebec (1914)
- Nina o' the Theatre (1914) short
- The Weakling (1914) short
- The Old Army Coat (1914) short
- Kit, The Arkansaw Traveler (1914) short
- The Green Rose (1914) short
- The Viper (1914) short
- Fate's Midnight Hour (1914) short
- The Lynbrook Tragedy (1914) short
- The Riddle of the Green Umbrella (1914) short
- The Theft of the Crown Jewels (1914) short
- The Price of Silence (1914) short
- The School for Scandal (1914) short
- The Mayor's Secretary (1914) short
- Cast Up by the Sea (1915) short
- The Swindler (1915) short
- The White Goddess (1915) short
- Unfaithful to His Trust (1915) short
- The Lure of Mammon (1915) short
- When the Mind Sleeps (1915) short
- Over Night (1915)
- The Romance of the Hollow Tree (1916) short
- For Uncle Sam's Navy (1916) short
- The Seven Swans (1917)
- Resurrection (1918)
- All Woman (1918)
- Uncle Tom's Cabin (1918)
- Peg o' the Sea (1918)
- Fedora (1918)
- Hidden Fires (1918)
- A Perfect Lady (1918)
- Day Dreams (1919)
- The Woman on the Index (1919)
- The Trap (1919)
- Erstwhile Susan (1919)
- The Eternal Mother (1920)
- Why Leave Your Husband? (1920)
- The Woman Game (1920)
- The Wakefield Case (1921) (as Jerry Austin)
- The Splendid Lie (1922)
- Cardigan (1922)
- His Mystery Girl (1923)
- Pure Grit (1923)
- Single Wives (1924)
- Sundown (1924)
- A Regular Fellow (1925) (as Jerry Austin)
- The Storm Breaker (1925)
- The Cowboy and the Countess (1926)
- The Demon (1926)
- The Desperate Game (1926)
- The Mad Racer (1926) short
