= The Price of Honor =

1927 silent crime film

- Directed by: Edward H. Griffith
- Written by: Dorothy Howell
- Produced by: Harry Cohn
- Starring: Dorothy Revier; Malcolm McGregor; Gustav von Seyffertitz
- Cinematography: J.O. Taylor
- Production company: Columbia Pictures
- Distributed by: Columbia Pictures
- Release date: March 5, 1927
- Running time: 57 minutes
- Country: United States
- Languages: Silent; English intertitles

The Price of Honor is a 1927 American silent crime film directed by Edward H. Griffith and starring Dorothy Revier, Malcolm McGregor, and Gustav von Seyffertitz.

== Cast ==
- Dorothy Revier as Carolyn McLane
- Malcolm McGregor as Anthony Fielding
- William V. Mong as Daniel B. Joyt
- Gustav von Seyffertitz as Peter Fielding
- Erville Alderson as Ogden Bennett
- Dan Mason as Roberts

== Preservation and status ==
A complete copy of the film is held in the Library of Congress.

== Bibliography ==
- Langman, Larry. American Film Cycles: The Silent Era. Greenwood Publishing, 1998.
