= Tropical Nights (1928 film) =

1928 film

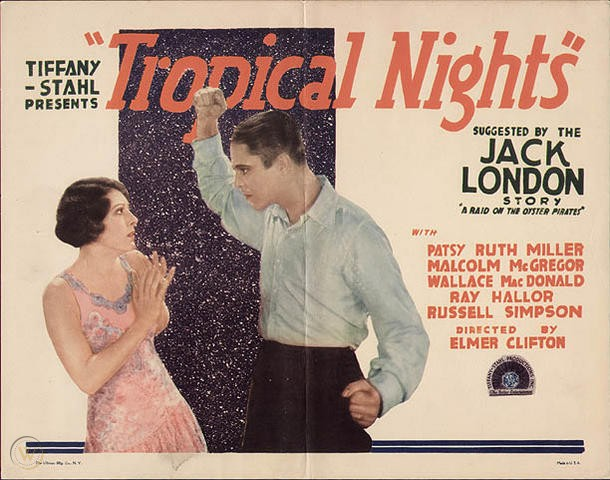
- Directed by: Elmer Clifton
- Written by: Bennett Cohen; Harry Carr
- Based on: A Raid on the Oyster Pirates by Jack London
- Produced by: John M. Stahl
- Starring: Patsy Ruth Miller; Malcolm McGregor; Ray Hallor
- Cinematography: John W. Boyle; Ernest Miller
- Edited by: Desmond O'Brien
- Production company: Tiffany Pictures
- Distributed by: Tiffany Pictures
- Release date: December 10, 1928
- Running time: 60 minutes
- Country: United States
- Language: Silent (English intertitles)

Tropical Nights is a 1928 American silent drama film directed by Elmer Clifton and starring Patsy Ruth Miller, Malcolm McGregor and Ray Hallor. It is based on the Jack London story A Raid on the Oyster Pirates.

== Plot ==
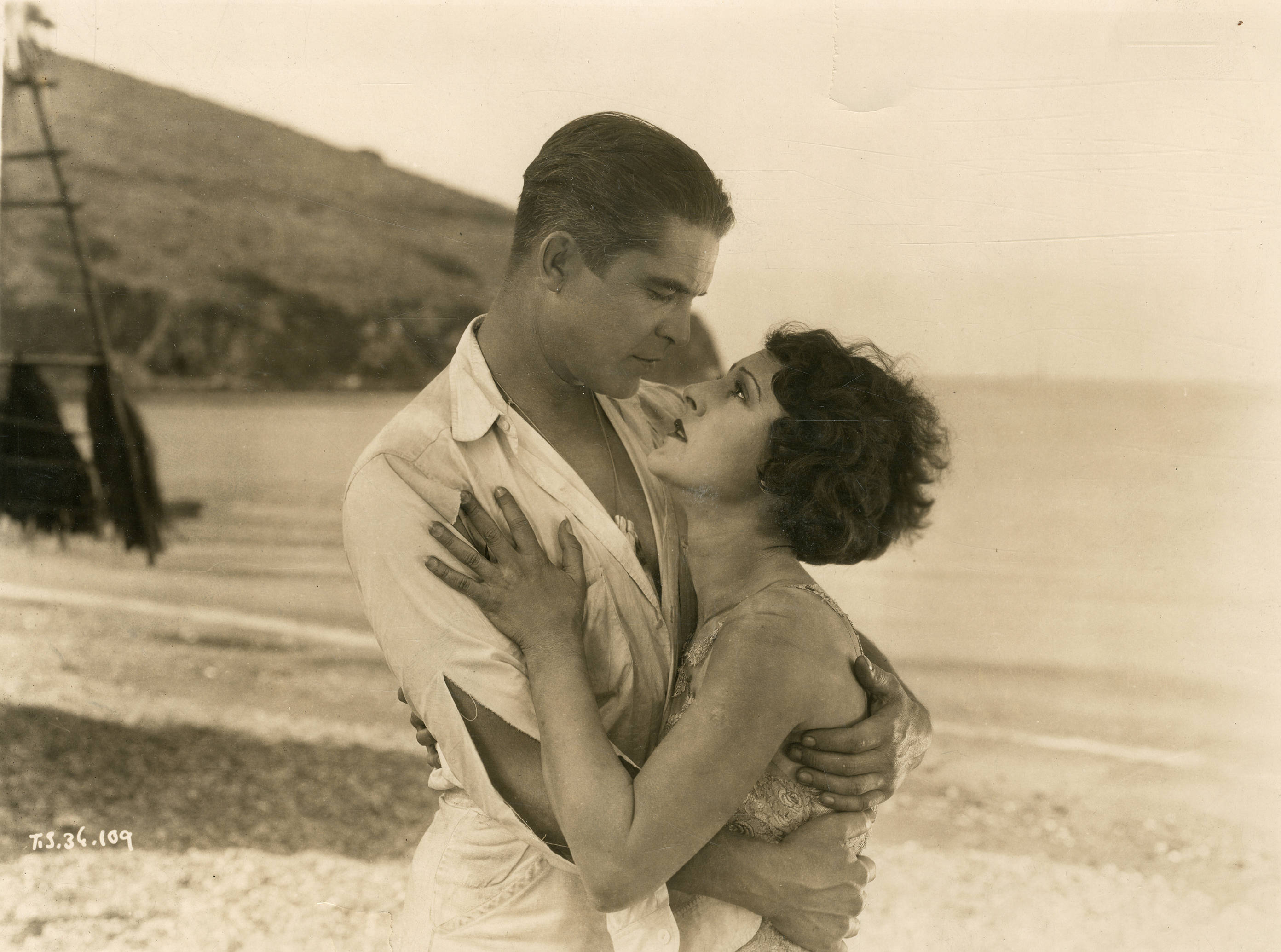
McGregor and Miller

Brothers Harvey and Jim operate a pearl diving barge on an island in the South Seas. Harvey tries it on with a Mary Hale, an opera singer stranded in the area and working in a waterfront dive bar, and is knocked out by her. Shortly afterwards Stavnow robs Harvey of his pearls and kills him when he wakes up and fights back. Mary meets Jim and falls in love, but is guilt-stricken as she believes that she is responsible for his brother's death.

== Cast ==
- Patsy Ruth Miller as Mary Hale
- Malcolm McGregor as Jim
- Ray Hallor as Harvey
- Wallace MacDonald as Stavnow
- Russell Simpson as Singapore Joe

== Censorship ==
When Tropical Nights was released, many states and cities in the United States had censor boards that could require cuts or other eliminations before the film could be shown. The Kansas censor board ordered a cut of an intertitle with the caption, "On your way, fresh. I've been coaxed by millionaires."

== Bibliography ==
- Goble, Alan. The Complete Index to Literary Sources in Film. Walter de Gruyter, 1999. ISBN 1-85739-229-9
