= The Woman Game =

1920 film

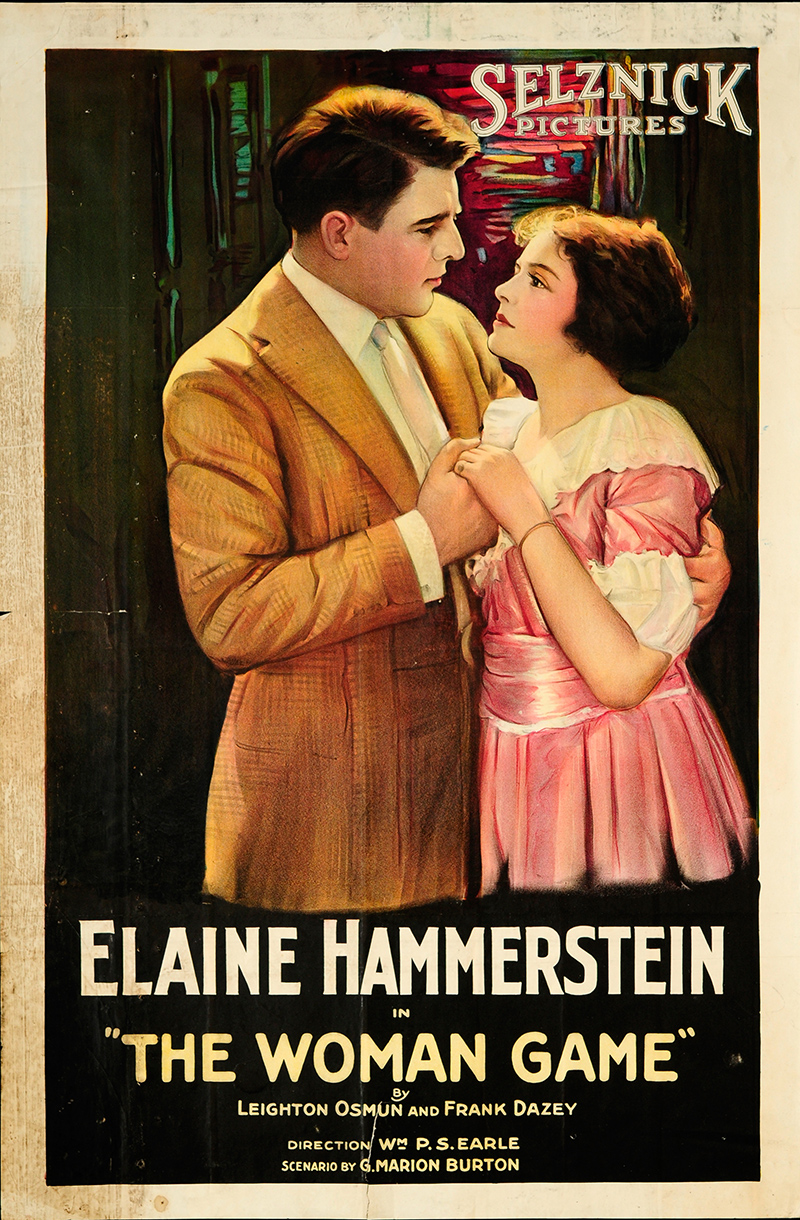
- lobby poster
- Directed by: William P. S. Earle
- Written by: G. Marion Burton
- Based on: A screen story by Leighton Osmun and Frank Dazey
- Produced by: Lewis J. Selznick
- Starring: Elaine Hammerstein; Jere Austin
- Cinematography: William Wagner
- Distributed by: Selznick
- Release date: January 5, 1920
- Running time: 5 reels
- Country: USA
- Language: Silent..English intertitles

The Woman Game is a 1920 silent film society drama directed by William P. S. Earle and starring Elaine Hammerstein and Jere Austin. It was produced and released by Selznick Pictures Corporation. It is a surviving silent held in the Library of Congress collection.

== Cast ==
- Elaine Hammerstein as Amy Terrell
- Jere Austin as Andrew Masters
- Louis Broughton as Capt. Davenport
- Florence Billings as Mrs. Van Trant
- Charles Eldridge as Jacky Van Trant
- Ida Darling as Mrs. SmytheasSmythe
- Blanche Davenport as Mrs. Terrell
- James W. Morrison as Leonard Travers
- Charles Duncan

== Preservation status ==
- Print held by The Library of Congress.
