= The Palace of Pleasure (film) =

1926 film

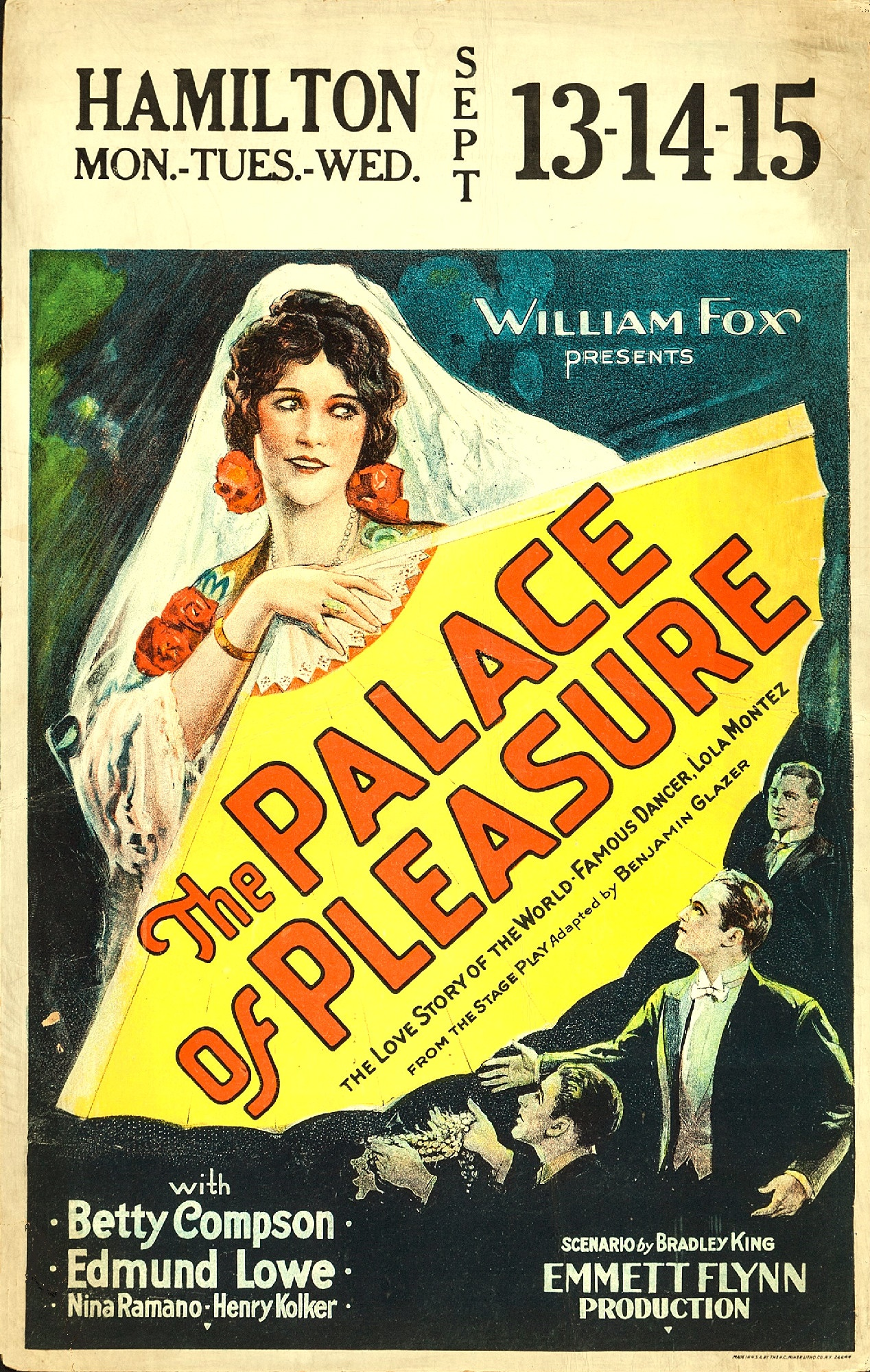
- Window poster
- Directed by: Emmett J. Flynn
- Screenplay by: Benjamin Glazer; Bradley King
- Starring: Betty Compson; Edmund Lowe; Henry Kolker; Harvey Clark; Nina Romano; Francis McDonald
- Cinematography: Ernest Palmer
- Production company: Fox Film Corporation
- Distributed by: Fox Film Corporation
- Release date: January 10, 1926
- Running time: 60 minutes
- Country: United States
- Language: Silent (English intertitles)

The Palace of Pleasure is a lost 1926 American silent drama film directed by Emmett J. Flynn. It was adapted for the screen by Benjamin Glazer and Bradley King based on the 1917 play Lola Montez, the Spanish Dancer by Adolf Paul. The film stars Betty Compson, Edmund Lowe, Henry Kolker, Harvey Clark, Nina Romano, and Francis McDonald. The film was released on January 10, 1926, by Fox Film Corporation.

Fox also produced English and Spanish-language adaptations of the play in 1930.

== Plot ==
As described in a film magazine review, Don Sebastian, Portuguese Premier, sets a price on the head of royalist Ricardo Madons. Madons is in love with actress Lola Montez, whom Sebastian also adores. Madons abducts Lola and compels her to wed him, but then does not hold her to the compact. Lola, who is really in love with him, repents having sent for assistance when she was taken. When Sebastian's soldiers arrive, Lola is nearly slain when she stops a bullet meant for Madons. She plots successfully and escapes with Madons, and the couple find happiness across the border.

== Cast ==
- Betty Compson as Lola Montez
- Edmund Lowe as Ricardo Madons
- Henry Kolker as Don Sebastian, Premier
- Harvey Clark as Police Chief
- Nina Romano as Maid
- Francis McDonald as Captain Fernandez
- George Siegmann as Caesar

== Preservation ==
The Palace of Pleasure is currently presumed lost. In February of 2021, the film was cited by the National Film Preservation Board on their Lost U.S. Silent Feature Films list.

== See also ==
- List of lost films
- 1937 Fox vault fire
