= Buck Privates (1928 film) =

1928 film

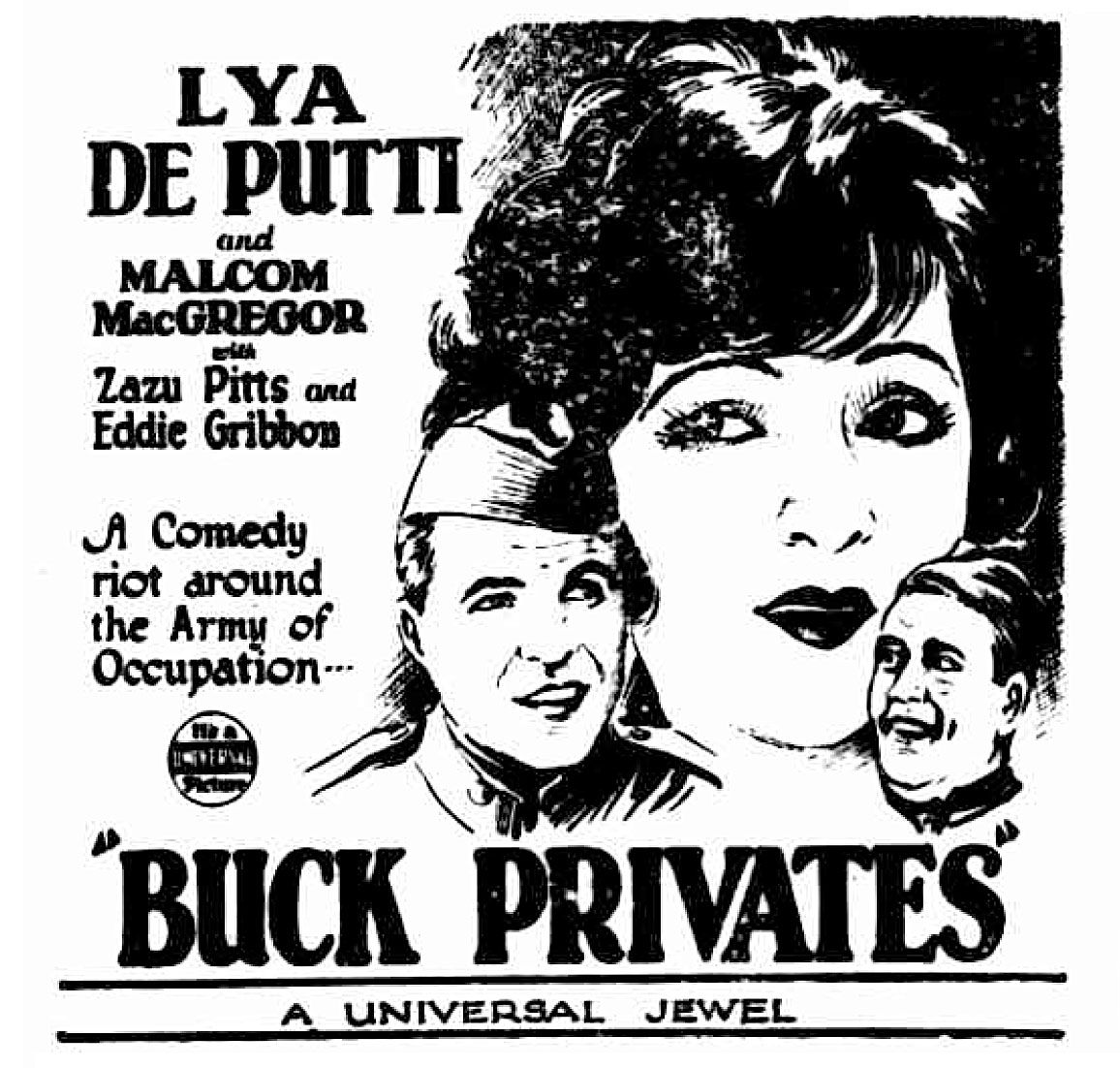
- Advertisement
- Directed by: Melville W. Brown
- Written by: Melville W. Brown; John B. Clymer; Albert DeMond
- Story by: Stuart N. Lake
- Produced by: Carl Laemmle
- Starring: Lya De Putti; Malcolm McGregor; ZaSu Pitts
- Cinematography: John Stumar
- Edited by: Frank Atkinson; Ray Curtiss
- Production company: Universal Pictures
- Distributed by: Universal Pictures
- Release date: January 29, 1928
- Running time: 70 minutes
- Country: United States
- Language: Silent (English intertitles)

Buck Privates is a 1928 American silent comedy film directed by Melville W. Brown and starring Lya De Putti, Malcolm McGregor, and ZaSu Pitts.

== Plot ==
As described in a film magazine, John Smith left Yale University to make the world safe for democracy. After the World War I Armistice, he is quartered in a little German village near the Rhine River at the home of Major von Hartmann, and here he falls in love with Anne, the gruff Major's daughter. Von Hartmann is president of a pacifist society and opposed to the army of occupation. To make matters worse, the village officials agree to shear the hair of any of their daughters found fraternizing with American soldiers. Annie is the first to be caught and shorn. To shield Smith from punishment, Anne allows the authorities to believe that the man seen with her in the garden was the tough American top sergeant whom she despises. Captain Marshall threatens to bring the sergeant to trial by court-martial unless he agrees to marry the girl. Anne escapes in a soldier's uniform while her ugly maid puts on the bridal veil and marches to the altar in her stead. Smith, frantic over the outcome, stops the wedding by kidnapping the bride during the ceremony and racing away with her. He is followed by Anne on a motorcycle, but Smith tries to outdistance her, believing her to be a soldier pursuing him. The sergeant's friends finally get the bride away from him and the top sergeant marries the wrong woman while Smith walks away dejected after his apparent defeat. As he nears the gate he sees Anne comes limping in. She falls in his arms while the sergeant lifts the bridal veil for the first time and learns that he has married the maid.

== Cast ==
- Lya De Putti as Annie
- Malcolm McGregor as John Smith
- ZaSu Pitts as Hulda
- James A. Marcus as Major von Hartmann
- Eddie Gribbon as Sgt. Butts
- Taylor N. Duncan as Capt. Marshall
- Bud Jamison as Cupid Dodds
- Les Bates as Mose Bloom

== Preservation ==
A print of Buck Privates is in the George Eastman Museum Motion Picture Collection.

== Bibliography ==
- Munden, Kenneth White. The American Film Institute Catalog of Motion Pictures Produced in the United States, Part 1. University of California Press, 1997.
