= Nancy Mann Waddel Woodrow =

American writer

Mrs. Wilson Woodrow
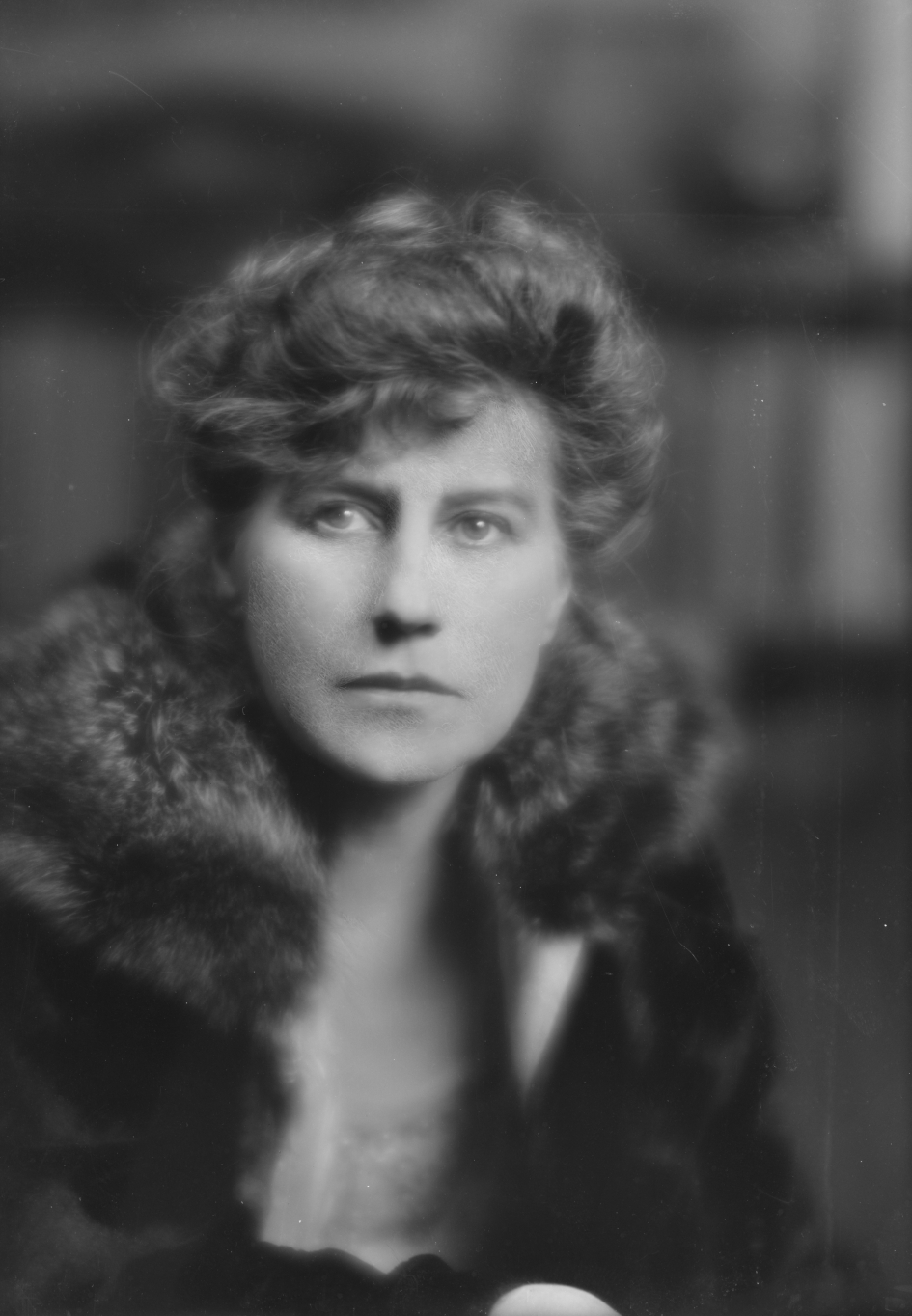
- Born: Nancy Mann Waddel; 1867 Chillicothe, Ohio
- Died: September 7, 1935 (aged 67–68)
- Occupation: Writer

Nancy Mann Waddel Woodrow (born c. 1867 – September 7, 1935) was an American writer, often credited as Mrs. Wilson Woodrow.

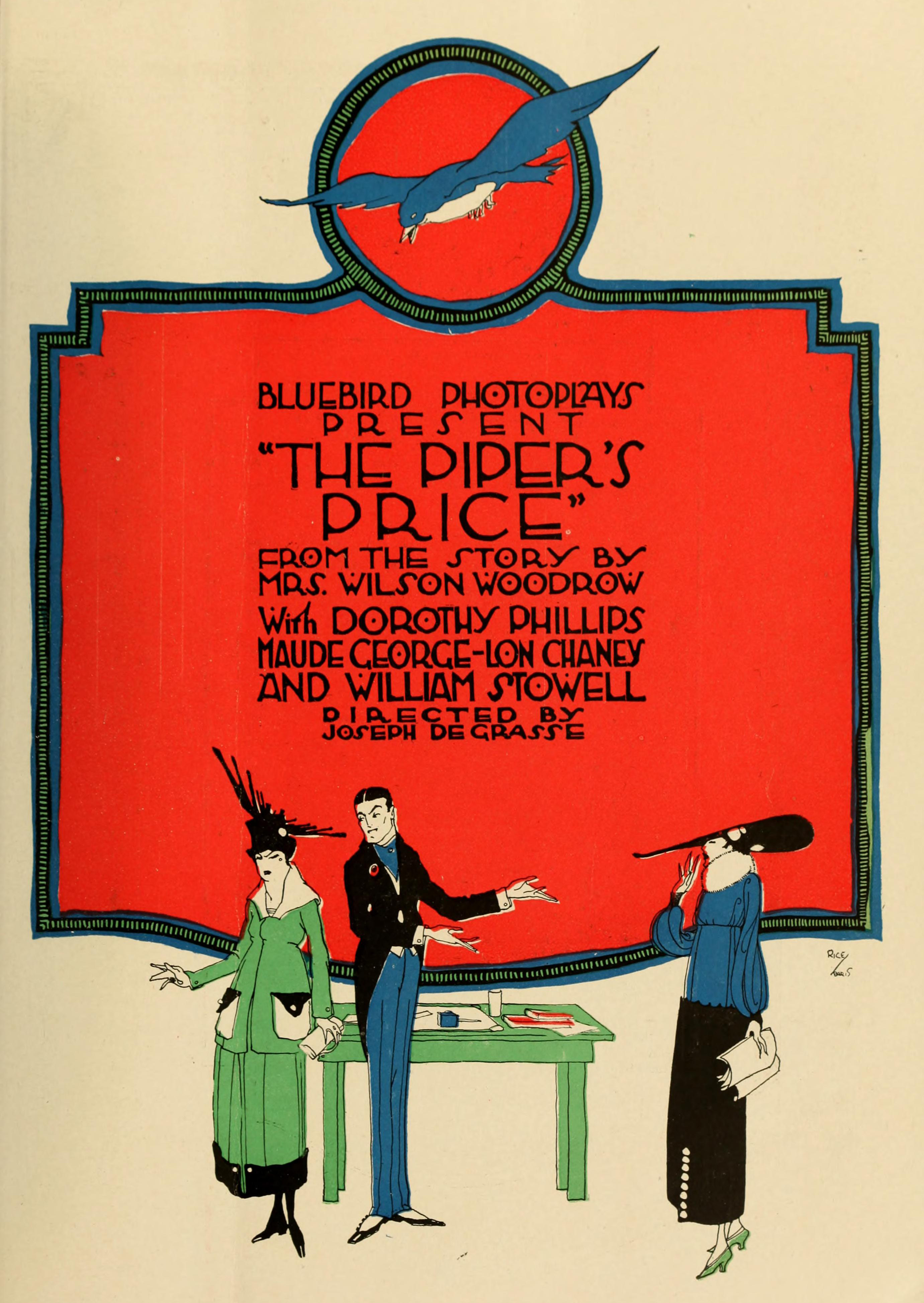
The Piper's Price poster, crediting Mrs. Wilson Woodrow for the story

== Early life ==
Nancy Mann Waddel was born in Chillicothe, Ohio, daughter of William Waddel and Jane McCoy Waddel. (The family's surname is also seen as Waddle and Waddell.) As a young woman, Nancy Waddel was briefly the assistant editor of the Chillicothe Daily News.

== Career ==
Novels by Nancy Waddel Woodrow, many of them focused on women characters in American West, included The Bird of Time (1907), The New Missioner (1907), The Silver Butterfly (1908, titled The Veiled Mariposa in serial form), The Beauty (1910), Sally Salt (1912), The Hornet's Nest (1917), Swallowed Up (1922), Burned Evidence (1925), Come Alone (1929), The Second Chance (1931), and The Pawns of Murder (1932).

She also wrote many short stories and essays published in magazines, and one play (The Universal Impulse, 1911). At least two dozen films were made from stories by Nancy Waddel Woodrow, starting from A Gypsy Madcap (1914) through six more "Olive" shorts starring Mabel Trunnelle in 1914 and 1915, and The Piper's Price (1917), and ending with the only sound adaptation, Without Children (1935). "I've flitted from flower to flower," she explained in 1922, "short stories, novels, essays, the pictures, even a play. Sometimes I've flivvered, sometimes succeeded; but I've had a beautiful time."

== Personal life ==
Nancy Mann Waddel married mining engineer James Wilson Woodrow in 1897. He was a cousin of Woodrow Wilson. They divorced in 1905, but she was best known as "Mrs. Wilson Woodrow" for decades afterwards. Nancy Mann Waddel Woodrow died in 1935, aged about 60 years.
