= Tiny Ward =

American actor

- Born: Roscoe Samuel Ward
- Occupation: actor

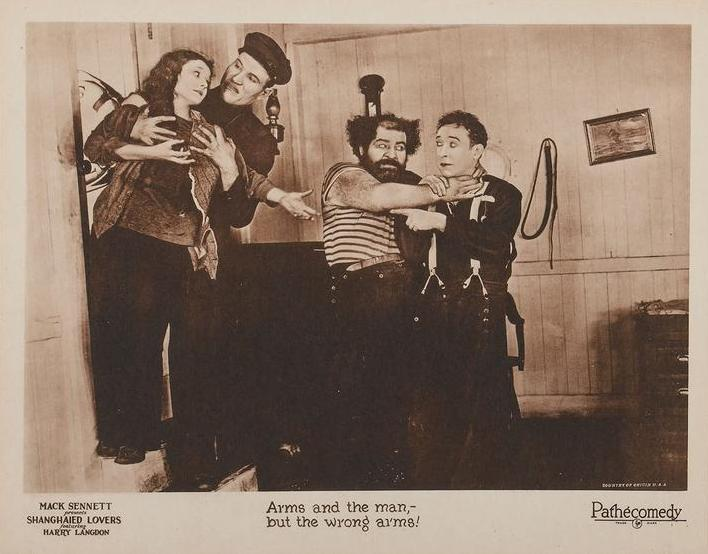
(Left to right) Alice Day, Tiny Ward, Kalla Pasha, Harry Langdon in Shanghaied Lovers, March 1924

His New Mamma (1924)

Roscoe Samuel "Tiny" Ward (January 2, 1893 – September 12, 1956) was an American actor. He occasionally was billed as Jack "Tiny" Ward. Due to his appearance in several "classics" he is a fairly well-known face in film history.

== Early life ==
He was born on January 2, 1893, in Indian Point near Abingdon, Illinois the son of Roscoe E. Ward (1855-1925). He was exceptionally tall (6'7") earning him the sarcastic nickname "Tiny".

== Career ==
In the 1920s he worked primarily in Mack Sennett comedies, frequently under the direction of Harry Edwards and often supporting Harry Langdon. He also worked with Charlie Chaplin, Laurel and Hardy and Lon Chaney.

He was popular and although never achieving a lead role, he was a frequent choice as either a burly policeman or tough guy. He appeared in the "Smith" series of silent films with Raymond McKee but these now fail to receive much recognition despite contemporary success. Unlike many fellow actors he survive the transition from silent to sound in 1930. Sadly after leaving Mack Sennett as a regular he had few notable roles other than a brief spate of work with The Three Stooges.

== Military service ==
He served two enlistment periods during World War I. He enlisted in the U.S. Army, Co. B, 164th Infantry at Fargo, Cass County, North Dakota and was discharged 25 Nov 1917 at Camp Green, South Carolina, it appears from health issues. The second enlistment was in the Navy on 16 Sep 1918 at San Pedro, Los Angeles, CA and discharged from the same place on 21 Jan 1919.

He appears to have got in "The Old Man's Draft" of April 1942 in the Second World War which did not so much draft men from 45 to 64 as assess the potential of unemployed men to serve the war effort. He was at that time 49. His appearance in the draft suggests unemployment (typical for all actors). He does not appear to have had any active service (or reallocation) and reappears in at least two films prior to the end of the war.

== Death ==
He died in Los Angeles on September 12, 1956. He is buried with his family in Abingdon Cemetery in Abingdon, Illinois.

== Selected filmography ==
- Shoulder Arms (1918) as a soldier with Charlie Chaplin
- Her First Kiss (1919)
- Gee Whiz (1920) as the Southern Uncle
- Married Life (1920) as man with barrel
- The Quack Doctor (1920)
- The Shriek of Araby (1923) with Ben Turpin
- His New Mamma (1924)
- Picking Peaches (1924)*short
- The Cat's Meow (1924)*short
- Shanghaied Lovers (1924)
- Scarem Much (1924)
- The Luck o' the Foolish (1924)
- Three Foolish Weeks (1924)
- Bull and Sand (1924)
- Off His Trolley (1924)
- Wandering waistlines (1924)
- Love's Sweet Piffle (1924)
- Galloping Bungalows (1924)
- Riders of the Purple Cows (1924)
- The Hansom Cabman (1924) with Harry Langdon
- The Sea Squawk (1924) with Harry Langdon
- The Wild Goose Chaser (1925)
- The Waning Sex (1926)
- Smith's Picnic (1926)
- Hoboken to Hollywood (1926)
- A Yankee Doodle Duke (1926)
- Spangles (1926)
- Smith's New Home (1927)
- Broke in China (1927)
- Fiddlesticks (1927) with Harry Langdon
- West of Zanzibar (1928) directed by Tod Browning and starring Lon Chaney
- Barnyard Rivals (1928)
- The Big Killing (1928)
- Taxi for Two (1928)
- Smith's Army Life (1928)
- Hubby's Last Alibi (1928)
- The Burglar (1928)
- Below the Deadline (1929)
- Don't Get Jealous (1929)
- The Hoose-Gow (1929) with Laurel and Hardy
- A Hollywood Theme Song (1930)
- City Lights (1931) with Charlie Chaplin
- Half Holiday (1931)
- Lighthouse Love (1932)
- Meet the Senator (1932)
- His Royal Shyness (1932)
- Doubling in the Quickies (1932)
- Bring 'Em Back a Wife (1933)
- Asleep in the Feet (1933)
- Hi'-Neighbor! (1934) with Our Gang
- Goofs and Saddles (1937) with The Three Stooges
- Love at First Fright (1941)
- Some More of Samoa (1941) with The Three Stooges
- Crazy House (1943) with Shemp Howard
- Barbary Coast Gent (1944) as a gent in town
- Incendiary Blonde (1945) as policeman
