= The Luck o' the Foolish =

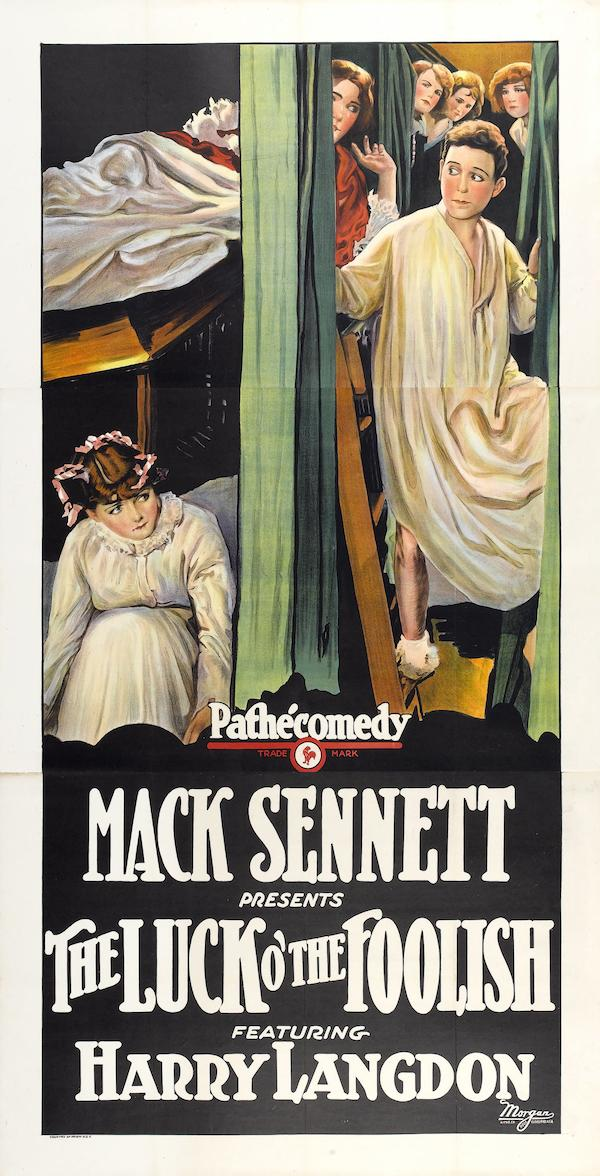
- Directed by: Harry Edwards
- Produced by: Mack Sennett
- Starring: Harry Langdon; Marceline Day
- Release date: September 14, 1924
- Country: United States
- Language: Silent (English intertitles)

The Luck O' The Foolish is a 1924 silent black and white short American film starring Harry Langdon directed by Harry Edwards and produced by Mack Sennett. It was the first time Edwards directed Langdon.

The title is a pun on "The Luck O' The Irish".

== Plot ==
Play film.

A steam train travels through the night. Onboard in a sleeping carriage are Mr and Mrs Newlywed: Harry and Marcie, in separate bunks. Marcie has rags tied in her hair to make curls. Harry is in the upper bunk.

A different woman tries to get in and the conductor says she is at the wrong berth. Harry drops his belongings into the central aisle and goes down to pick them up. He does not spot the woman moving the steps to the next berth so when he goes back up he is in the wrong berth. She pushes him out and he kicks the guy opposite. The guard directs him to the correct berth and he checks below that his wife is there. He goes to get some water and trips over a foot. The guard shows him back. He goes to the far end of the carriage and opens the door: a fierce wind blows in, disturbing everyone.

Last breakfast is called. The men all share a washroom and shave side by side. Harry is shaving with a straight razor. he uses a hand mirror to shave the back of his neck... but instead shaves the back of the neck of the man behind him.

Marcie waits in the main carriage. She is reading a letter from Uncle Bill saying he can give Harry a job if she brings $500. Maddie sits to the side with loudmouth Frank who spots Marcie as she counts her money to pay Uncle Bill. Harry pushes passed the guard to sit with Marcie and a few seconds later the sheriff sits down handcuffed to Dangerous Dan McGrew. Dan tries to outstare Harry. Dan's accomplice comes alongside the train, bobbing up and down on a railway handcart. The sheriff handcuffs Dan to Harry while he goes with the guard to try to arrest the accomplice. Dan rolls his trousers up to reveal a revolver strapped to each leg. He gives one to Harry and announces that they are now partners.

A pistol fight starts with Dan using Harry as a human shield. His tie gets shot in half. It is then reduced to a quarter then shot off totally. In the confusion Frank pickpockets Harry and the $500. Dan jumps off just before the station.

Lacking the $500, Harry returns to his old job as a policeman on the beat. The chief is on the other side of the road. Harry echoes his stiff walk. He waves but the Chief does not wave back. The Chief puts out his hand as if to shake before crossing the road but walks passed Harry to two women instead.

Harry sits under a telegraph pole to eat his packed lunch - a sandwich. A worker above accidentally drops a package of chewing tobacco into the sandwich just before Harry starts to eat. Harry chews uncomfortably before spotting his mistake. He feels ill and sees double. He crawls into the middle of the road and is almost run over. He appears to be vomiting off-screen but we then see he is drinking from a drinking fountain.

Harry is on night shift and is scared of the noises, including owls and howling dogs.

Marcie is working as a seamstress for Maddie. Maddie steps outside and asks Harry to make the dog stop howling. He goes round the back and hides beside the pool. Dangerous Dan appears and shines a torch across the pool.

Inside Maddie asks Marcie to stay for a party. Frank is there and drops Harry's wallet. Marcie puts on one of Maddie's gowns. Frank consoles her just as Harry comes in. Marcie is actually just stealing Harry's wallet back and tells him to go as soon as she gets it. Harry climbs to the roof. He sees Marcie through a window. She pulls the blind and he sees her silhouette as she takes her gown off to go home - he fears the worst and falls into the pool.

Frank realises the wallet has gone and demands Marcie gives it back. Dangerous Dan comes in with two bombs. He throws one at Frank who ducks. It goes out of the window into the pool and blows Harry onto the balcony. Dan and Frank are fighting inside. Harry threatens them with the second bomb, they step back and fall off the balcony. Marcie show she has got the wallet back but then the second bomb goes off. They are blown across the sky and land on the telegraph pole above the Chief of Police.

== Cast ==
- Harry Langdon as Mr Harry Newlywed
- Marceline Day as Mrs Marcie Newlywed (aged only 16)
- Frank J. Coleman as Derrick Wells the heavy
- Madeline Hurlock as Adeline McLusky the flirt (Maddie)
- Eli Stanton as Dangerous Dan McGrew
- Louise Carver as a train passenger
- Leo Sulky as a train passenger
- Tiny Ward as a train conductor
- Yorke Sherwood as a train passenger
- Kalla Pasha as a Bandit
- Hayes E. Robertson as the train attendant

== Links ==
The film at Public Domain Movies
