= Flirty Four-Flushers =

1926 film

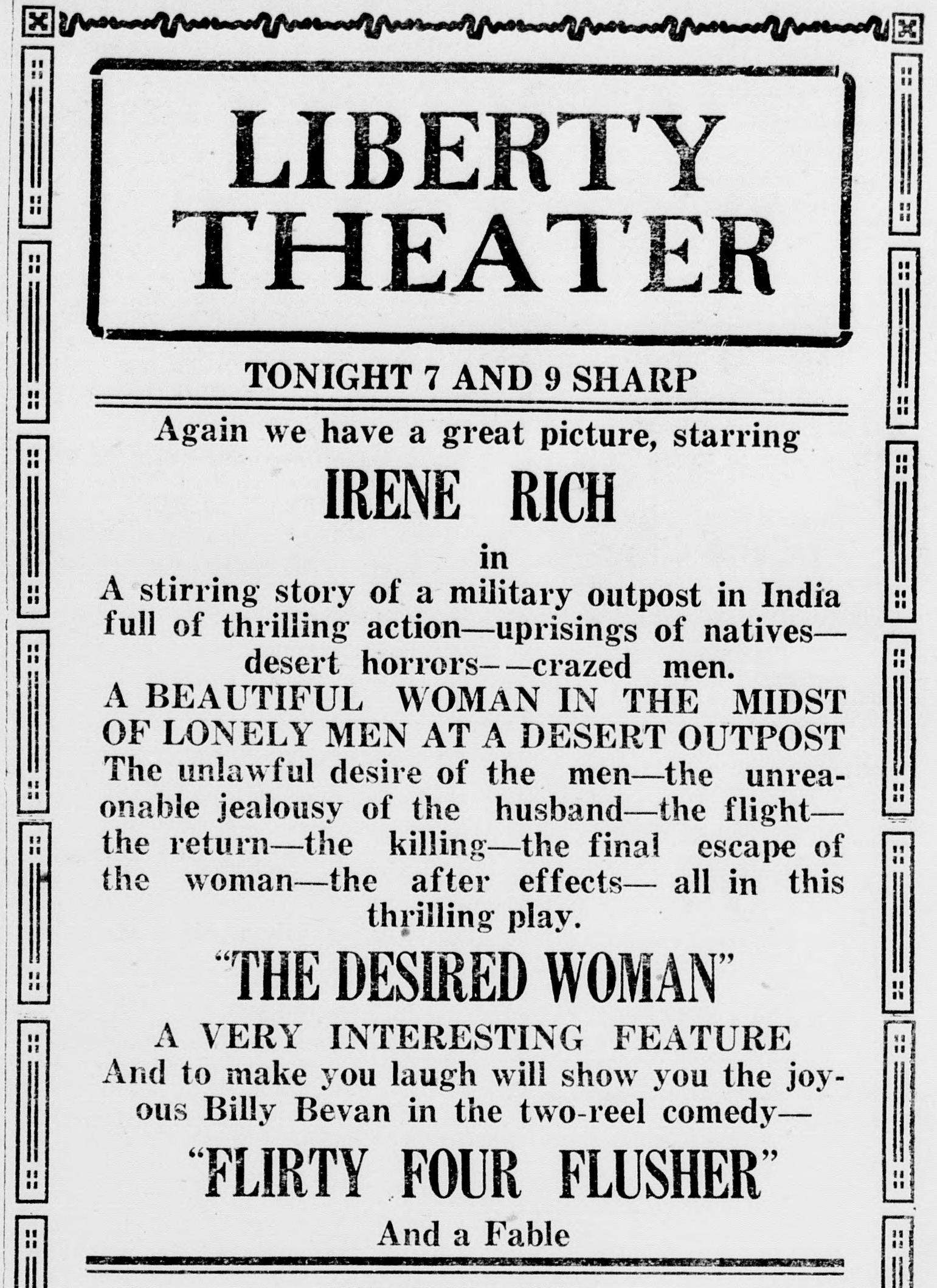
- Contemporary advertisement for The Desired Woman and Flirty Four-Flushers
- Directed by: Edward F. Cline
- Written by: Al Giebler; Mack Sennett; Jimmy Starr; Phil Whitman
- Based on: O. Henry
- Produced by: Mack Sennett
- Starring: Eddie Cline; Billy Bevan
- Cinematography: St. Elmo Boyce; Vernon L. Walker
- Edited by: William Hornbeck
- Production company: Mack Sennett Comedies
- Distributed by: Pathé Exchange
- Release date: December 26, 1926 (U.S.)
- Running time: 19 min
- Country: United States

The film

Flirty Four-Flushers is a 1926 comedy silent film produced by Mack Sennett and starred by Eddie Cline and Billy Bevan. Carl Harbaugh wrote the reelers of the film. It was distributed by Pathé. It was released on December 26, 1926.

Peaches and Plumbers gave Bevan a chance to display his acting talent, and also both films were an even better showcase for Madeline Hurlock.

Locations included Palisades Park, Ocean Blvd., Santa Monica, Hotel St. Catherine, Avalon and Catalina. It is a remake of A Summer Tragedy (1910) and it is based on O. Henry. Ruth Hiatt was originally considered for a role.

== Plot ==
After winning an essay contest, a waitress decides to transform her appearance and visit a luxurious resort with the intention of marrying a wealthy man.

== Cast ==
- Madeline Hurlock as Aggie Horton / Muriel Marlboro
- Billy Bevan as Jerry Connors / Archibald De Shyster
- Vernon Dent as Bill Brown
- Stanley Blystone as Joe, Aggie's Sweetheart
- Billy Gilbert as Soup Drinking Customer / Hotel Desk Clerk
- Thelma Hill as Bill Brown's Fiancée
- Ruth Taylor as Slumming Girl
- Leonora Summers as Gertie, the waitress
- Eleanor Hibbard as Newspaper Stand Clerk
- Evelyn Sherman as Slumming Mother
- Warren Burke as Slumming Boyfriend
- Eugene Jackson as Boy Eating Watermelon
- William McCall as Hotel Manager
- Art Rowlands as Slumming Man with Moustache
- William Searby as Customer Who Wants Ketchup
- Alice Ward

== Bibliography ==
- Walker, Brent E. (April 25, 2013). Mack Sennett's Fun Factory: A History and Filmography of His Studio and His Keystone and Mack Sennett Comedies, with Biographies of Players and Personnel. McFarland Publishing. p. 671. ISBN 9780786477111.
