= Fiddlesticks (1927 film) =

- The full film
- Directed by: Harry Edwards
- Written by: Arthur Ripley; Frank Capra
- Produced by: Mack Sennett
- Starring: Harry Langdon
- Cinematography: William Williams
- Edited by: William Hornbeck
- Production company: Mack Sennett Comedies
- Distributed by: Pathé Exchange
- Release date: 1927
- Running time: 20 minutes
- Country: United States
- Language: Silent

Fiddlesticks is a 1927 silent black and white short American film starring Harry Langdon directed by Harry Edwards and written by Frank Capra and produced by Mack Sennett.

"Fiddlesticks" is a faux swear word (i.e. in place of true swearing) common in the early 20th century and defunct by the end of the 20th century. In the context of the film it acts as a kind of pun in relation to Harry's double bass looking like an oversized fiddle.

The film was the final collaboration between Harry Langdon and Mack Sennett. The plot paralleled the Harold Lloyd film The Kid Brother released earlier that year.

== Plot ==
The Hogan family sit and debate their idle son - Harry. The men one to throw him out but Mrs Hogan hopes he will be a great musician one day.

Harry does not realise his own shortcomings as a music student, whose instrument of choice is the double bass. He attempts to play My Wild Irish Rose and his professor asks him to play "one tune at a time' as he is no "Super-Hooperdine". A note is pushed under the door - a complaint from the neighbours regarding the terrible noise. Harry succeeds in playing something which his professor recognises and his awarded a diploma, as the professor just wants to get rid of him.

At home, his family kick him out to try to make his own way in the world. They show no interest in his diploma.

He finds a bug-infested room in the city an goes out looking for work - with his double bass. Harry's landlord will not let him take his double bas out until he pays the rent. Harry lowers it out of the window but onto a sales area for an instrument shop below. He argues with the shop owner as to who owns it. Another man gives him $10 for a fiddle, thinking he owns the shop, and Harry uses that $10 to buy his own double bass back. At first he joins an international street band, headed by Prof von Tempo - but they decide he is not what they want. Von Tempo gives him his fee back and rips up his diploma.

Then an overly-stereotyped Jewish junkman offers him $2 for the instrument. But he wants a demonstration of how it sounds so Harry plays My wild Irish rose again. A man above throws a small metal paraffin heater at him. The junkman realises the potential of stuff thrown out of windows at Harry (to make him shut up) as this can be collected and sold. He gives Harry $5 to keep playing.

They return with a bigger cart and a protective cage around Harry to protect him from the thrown objects.

Harry finds a piano but a man owns it. The junkman offers $50 for it.

Next Harry drives up in a huge steam roller and accidentally crushes the piano. The junkman cries.The steam roller owner arrives and thinks his steam roller ran off on its own, H compensates Harry with $300 for the piano. He shares it with the junkman.

He goes home in top hat and tails. He says he made his money "fiddling around".

== Cast ==
- Harry Langdon as Harry Hogan
- Vernon Dent as Prof von Tempo and Penrod the junk dealer
- Anna Dodge as Harry's mother
- Leo Sulky as junk dealer
- Tiny Ward as the piano owner
