= The Hansom Cabman =

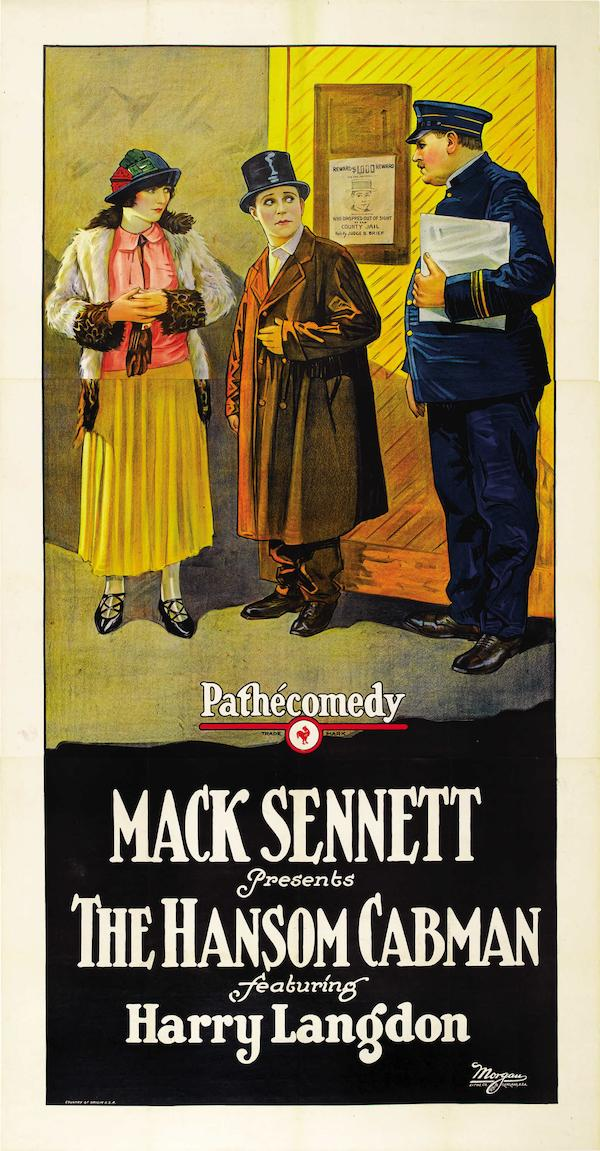
- Theatrical poster
- Directed by: Harry Edwards
- Written by: John A. Waldron (titles)
- Produced by: Mack Sennett
- Starring: Harry Langdon; Marceline Day
- Cinematography: Lee Davis; Vernon L. Walker
- Edited by: William Hornbeck
- Production company: Mack Sennett Comedies
- Distributed by: Pathé Exchange
- Release date: October 12, 1924
- Running time: 20 minutes
- Country: United States
- Language: Silent (English intertitles)

The Hansom Cabman is a 1924 American silent black and white short comedy film starring Harry Langdon directed by Harry Edwards and produced by Mack Sennett.

The name is an amalgam of the terms handsome cabman and hansom cab.

== Plot ==
The film begins at a tall hotel, "The Venus Arms" and we zoom in to a window. Inside Harry Doolittle nurses a hangover with an empty bottle by his side. It is his wedding day and we next see his bride-to-be, Betty Brief. She is with her two bridesmaids and she telephones Harry. He struggles to find the phone. He does not say much and goes back to bed. A butler comes in and starts making breakfast. Harry tells him to go, but the butler says his "wife" asked for it and clarifies that he got married last night at his party.

A woman opens a curtain and appears. Harry is shocked and lies back. She kisses him and he says he never saw her before. She starts crying and hugs him.

Betty and her mum arrive at his door. The mother asks "who's she?". He hands her a revolver and says "they say it's my wife". Betty stops her mum from shooting him. He reveals to the audience that he has a metal tray protecting his chest. It falls out of his pyjamas and the mother shoots him in the backside. Luckily he has a second tray there. His new wife starts throwing things, including a large sword which splits the door. An item leaves the room via the window and hits a policeman below. She awaits the policeman holding the sword. Harry knocks her out with a bottle but then revives her with a glass of water. As he goes to lie her on the bed he decides to get in himself instead.

A crowd has gathered outside the room. When the woman goes to strike Harry in the hallway she hits the butler instead and several people fall down the stairwell, hitting the policeman again. In the room the woman accuses Harry of being a wife-beater.

Play film

Betty and her mum go to her father Judge Brief to ask for advice. He is a very stern looking fellow. The policeman brings Harry in and the judge puts him in jail. Still in his pyjamas he is put in the lock-up with several burly men already there. They make fun of him and al skip off apart from a bobble-nosed drunk talking to a drawing on the wall about the sardine situation in Denmark. The man seems drunk and attacks an invisible rat before continuing the conversation with the drawing. Harry then also stamps on an invisible rat, a bigger one. The man congratulates him and introduces him to Napoleon (the drawing).

Betty comes to visit him and reminds him they were to marry that day. As he kisses her through the bars a man with a broken arm kicks his backside and tells him to get to work. He starts mopping the kitchen floor. The man (now holding a cleaver) tells him he is mopping the floor with the soup - cream of tomato. Five men play dice in a corner. Harry gives one man tips, losing him a lot of money. Harry runs off and falls down an elevator shaft which brings him out to an alley.

On Friday, Betty, her mum, the new wife and the butler go to the judge with the policeman. The woman says Harry means nothing and she was just trying to stop the butler stealing his money. Betty is elated and her father tells the policeman to release Harry. When he phones he is told he escaped that morning and the judge orders the entire police force to search for him.

Harry, unaware of his pending release has disguised himself as a cabman and stands beside a horse-drawn hansom cab. Harry sees a wanted poster for a criminal with a $5000 reward. The man standing nearby looks like the photo on the poster. Harry tries to double check. As Harry returns to his cab the man rips the poster down. A policeman puts up a new poster with Harry on it. Meanwhile Harry has found a different policeman and brings him back to look at the now-gone poster and criminal. Harry runs off. While hiding behind a bush he fails to notice he is on a plank for workmen and he is raised into the air. The police appear at an upper window. The plank falls as Harry goes in another window then he falls too.

He hits a car roof and ends in the back seat. He jumps onto his own cab just as a fare arrives: two chinamen smoking pipes. They ask to go to the Mah Jongg club. Harry starts to get affected by the rising opium smoke. At the traffic light he goes for a walk along the car roofs. He ends up on top of the police Black Maria which is carrying Betty and her mum in their search for him. It pulls up next to his hansom cab and he swaps over. Betty and her mum get off too. They tell him that the woman confessed and they get in the cab and tell him to hurry to the minister. En-route the horse sits down and Hary has to entice it. He throws something and all goes too far.

== Cast ==
see

- Harry Langdon as Harry Doolittle
- Marceline Day as Betty Brief
- Charlotte Mineau as Mrs Brief, Betty's mother
- Andy Clyde as Judge Brief, Betty's father
- Madeline Hurlock as the Vamp
- Leo Sulky as the Butler
- William Blaisdell as policeman (uncredited)
- Thelma Hill as a bridesmaid
- Elsie Tarron as a bridesmaid
- Tiny Ward as the dice player
- Charles Force as prison Guard
- Yorke Sherwood as a Prisoner
