= Boobs in the Wood =

1925 film by Harry Edwards

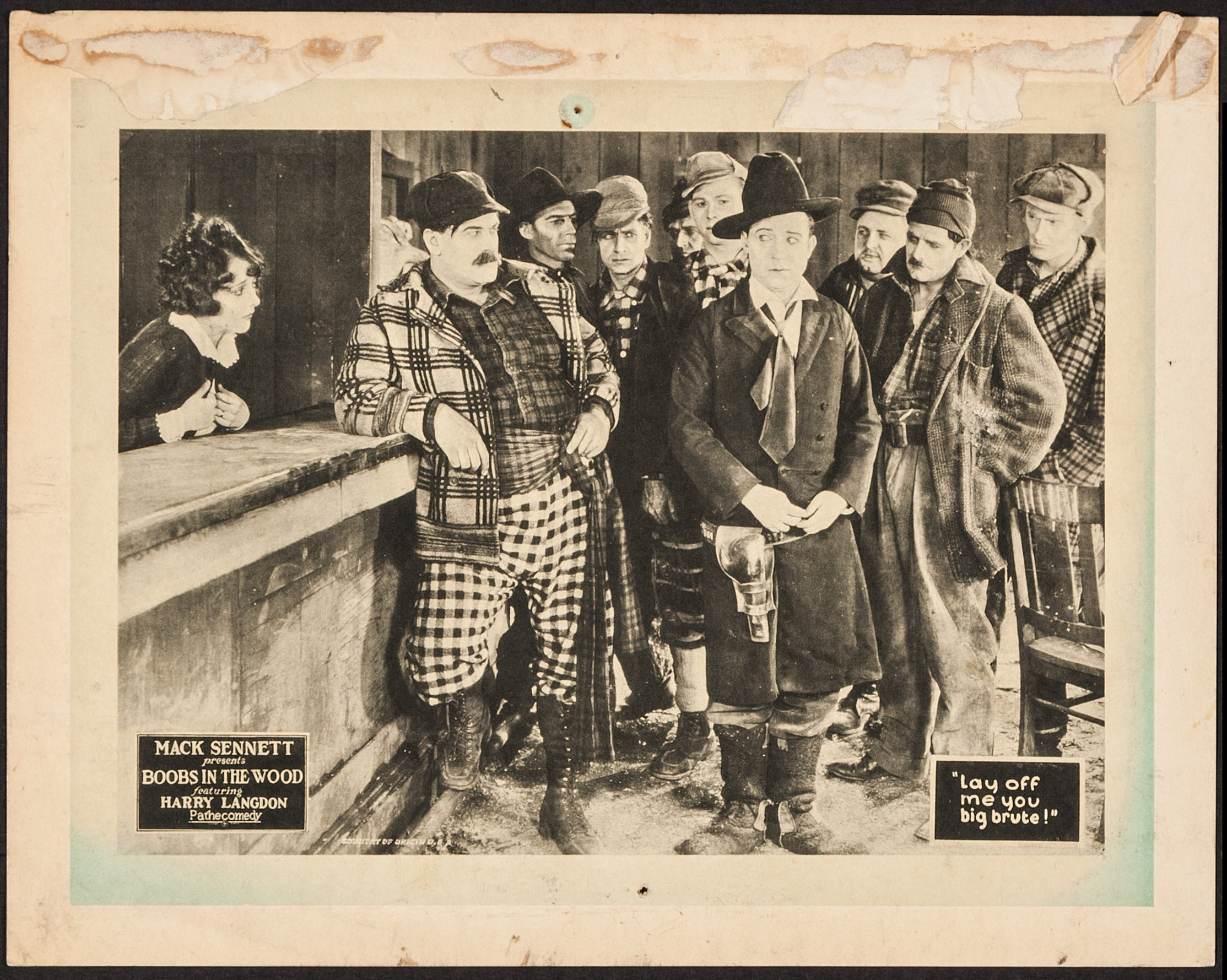
- Lobby card for the film
- Directed by: Harry Edwards
- Written by: Arthur Ripley
- Produced by: Mack Sennett
- Starring: Harry Langdon; Marie Astaire; Vernon Dent; Leo Willis; William McCall; Barney Hellum; Leo Sulky
- Production company: Mack Sennett Comedies
- Release date: February 1, 1925
- Running time: 20 minutes
- Country: United States
- Language: Silent (English intertitles)

Boobs in the Wood is a 1925 silent black and white short American film starring Harry Langdon, directed by Harry Edwards, and produced by Mack Sennett. It was Sennett's first film written by Arthur Ripley.

The title is a pun on Babes in the Wood. Alternative titles considered before release included Buzz Saw and Buckwheat and The Lumber Ox.

== Plot ==
Chester, a lumberjack, walks through a forest and narrowly avoids being hit by a falling tree. Attempting to chop a marked tree, he finds it impervious to his axe. He meets Hazel Wood, who shows interest in him despite her boss, Big Bill Reardon, warning him away. Bill tricks Chester onto a log slide, but ends up being dragged down himself. At the bottom, Chester is launched and then beaten by Bill.

Later, Chester arrives injured in a logging town, where Hazel is offered a saloon cashier job. Chester is hired as a dishwasher. He struggles with a massive pile of dishes and has several mishaps. A saloon customer demands soup, but after Chester accidentally adds a lamp to the pot, chaos ensues. The cook chases Chester but is knocked out by a mule, leading others to believe Chester delivered the blow. He earns the nickname "The Crying Killer."

Now working as a bouncer, Chester impresses patrons with a rigged gun trick. Tough Mike, fooled into believing Chester has extraordinary aim, flees. Bill returns, confronts Chester, and starts a fight. The lights go out during the brawl. When they return, Chester is the only one standing. He revives Bill with whiskey, knocks him out again, and leaves with Hazel.

== Cast ==
- Harry Langdon as Chester Winfield
- Marie Astaire as Hazel Wood, the Girl
- Vernon Dent as Big Bill Reardon, the rival
- Leo Willis as the Tough Cook
- William McCall as the Saloon Owner
- Barney Hellum as the Dishwasher
- Leo Sulky as Tough Mike, the customer

== Bibliography ==
- Boobs in the Wood on YouTube
