= Madeline Hurlock =

American actress

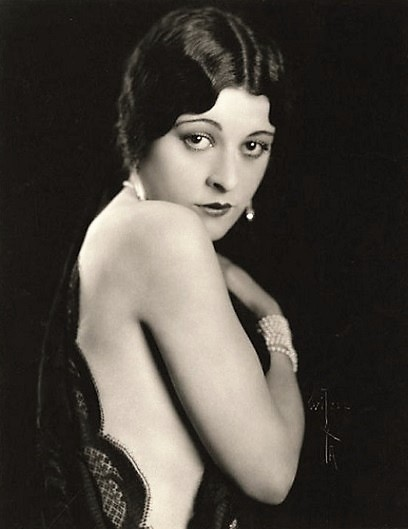
- Hurlock in the 1920s
- Born: December 12, 1897; Federalsburg, Maryland, U.S.
- Died: April 4, 1989 (aged 91); New York City, U.S.
- Occupation: Actress
- Years active: 1923–1929
- Spouses: John S. McGovern (m. 1917; div. 1924) Marc Connelly (m. 1930; div. 1935) Robert E. Sherwood (m. 1935; died 1955)

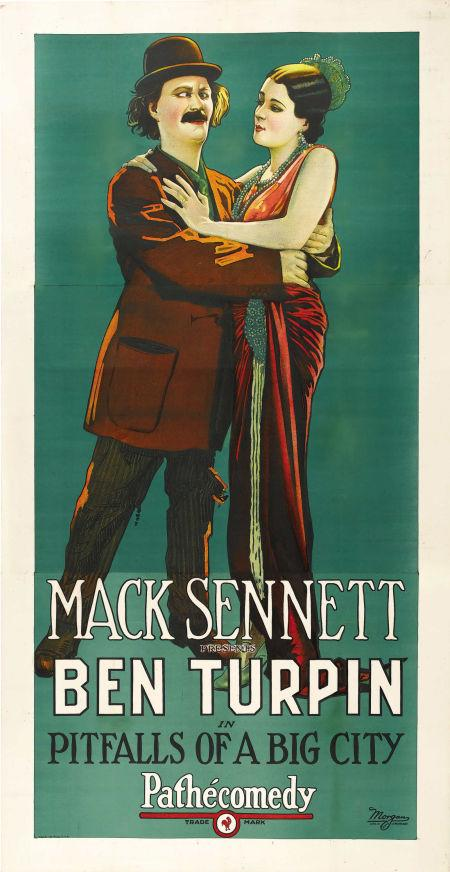
Madeline Hurlock and Ben Turpin in Pitfalls of a Big City (1923).

Madeline Hurlock (December 12, 1897 – April 4, 1989) was an American silent film actress.

== Biography ==
Madeline Hurlock was born in Federalsburg, Maryland on December 12, 1897 (some sources say 1899 or 1900), the daughter of John W. Hurlock, an engineer, and Sallie Hurlock. She was of English and Italian ancestry. Hurlock attended a finishing school in Philadelphia, after which she acted in a repertory theatre company there.

In New York, Hurlock acted and danced in musical comedies at the Century Roof Garden and made her Broadway debut in the ensemble cast of The Rose of China in 1919.

Hurlock appeared in many short comedies for Mack Sennett, debuting as one of the Sennett Bathing Beauties in 1923, and was one of the WAMPAS Baby Stars of 1925. She was a talented comedian, also known for her beauty. She appeared in over 50 short films, the first of which, Where's My Wandering Boy This Evening? was made in 1923, and the last, Pink Pajamas, in 1929. She featured in one of Laurel and Hardy's early films, Duck Soup.

Hurlock married three times:

- She married Army Sergeant John S. McGovern in Ellicott City, Maryland, on August 4, 1917. They divorced in 1924.
- Marc Connelly, married 1930, divorced 1935. Connelly won the Pulitzer Prize for his play The Green Pastures in 1930.
- Robert E. Sherwood, she met Sherwood on an ocean liner, Hurlock divorced Connelly in Riga, and married Sherwood in 1935, at Budapest. Sherwood won the Pulitzer Prize four times; he died in 1955.

According to Myrna Loy's autobiography, Hurlock and Sherwood had a difficult time getting married. In Budapest, she told Loy, "These suspicious old men kept saying, 'You have to be examined to see if you are... if you are... why are you getting married? Are you pregnant?'"

== Selected filmography ==
- The Daredevil (1923)
- The Luck o' the Foolish (1924)
- The Cat's Meow (1924)
- The Hansom Cabman (1925)
- Butter Fingers (1925)
- Don Juan's Three Nights (1926)
- Flirty Four-Flushers (1926)
- Duck Soup (1927)
