= See America Thirst =

1930 film by William James Craft

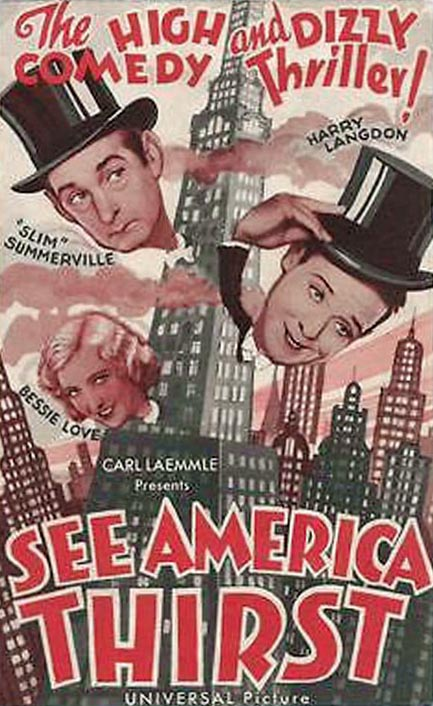
- Film programme
- Directed by: William James Craft
- Written by: Jerry Horwin; Edward Ludwig; Vin Moore
- Produced by: Carl Laemmle
- Starring: Harry Langdon; Slim Summerville; Bessie Love
- Cinematography: Arthur C. Miller
- Edited by: Harry W. Lieb
- Music by: Sam Perry (silent version); Heinz Roemheld (silent version)
- Distributed by: Universal Pictures
- Release date: November 23, 1930 (U.S.)
- Running time: 75 minutes; 8 reels
- Country: United States
- Language: English

See America Thirst is a 1930 American pre-Code comedy film produced and distributed by Universal Pictures and directed by William James Craft. Silent comics Harry Langdon and Slim Summerville star along with Bessie Love. Though released late in 1930, it nevertheless had a silent version.

In the film, Bessie Love introduced the type of sandals later known as "flip-flops" to American audiences. The title is a parody of the Cole Porter musical See America First.

== Plot ==
Slim and Wally are mistaken for hired killers and are paid to murder a bootlegger. They encounter nightclub singer Ellen, associated with the district attorney's office, who assists them in convincing the gang leader to pay them double for protection. Everything goes well until the actually hired killers show up.

== Cast ==
- Harry Langdon as Wally
- Slim Summerville as Slim
- Bessie Love as Ellen
- Mitchell Lewis as Screwy O'Toole
- Matthew Betz as Insect McGann
- Stanley Fields as Spumoni
- Lloyd Whitlock as O'Toole's henchman
- Richard Alexander as McGann's henchman
- Tom Kennedy as Shivering Smith
- Lew Hearn as inventor
- Leroy Mason as attorney
- Walter Brennan as Spumoni bodyguard (uncredited)
- Franklyn Farnum as master of ceremonies (uncredited)
- Pat Harmon as waiter (uncredited)
- Tom London as Spumoni hood (uncredited)
- Robert McKenzie as waiter, sign changer (uncredited)
- Hal Price as cop (uncredited)

== Reception ==
The film did not receive positive reviews and was deemed not to be funny.

== Preservation status ==
Copies are preserved at the UCLA Film and Television Archive and the Library of Congress.
