= The Cat's Meow (1924 film) =

1924 film

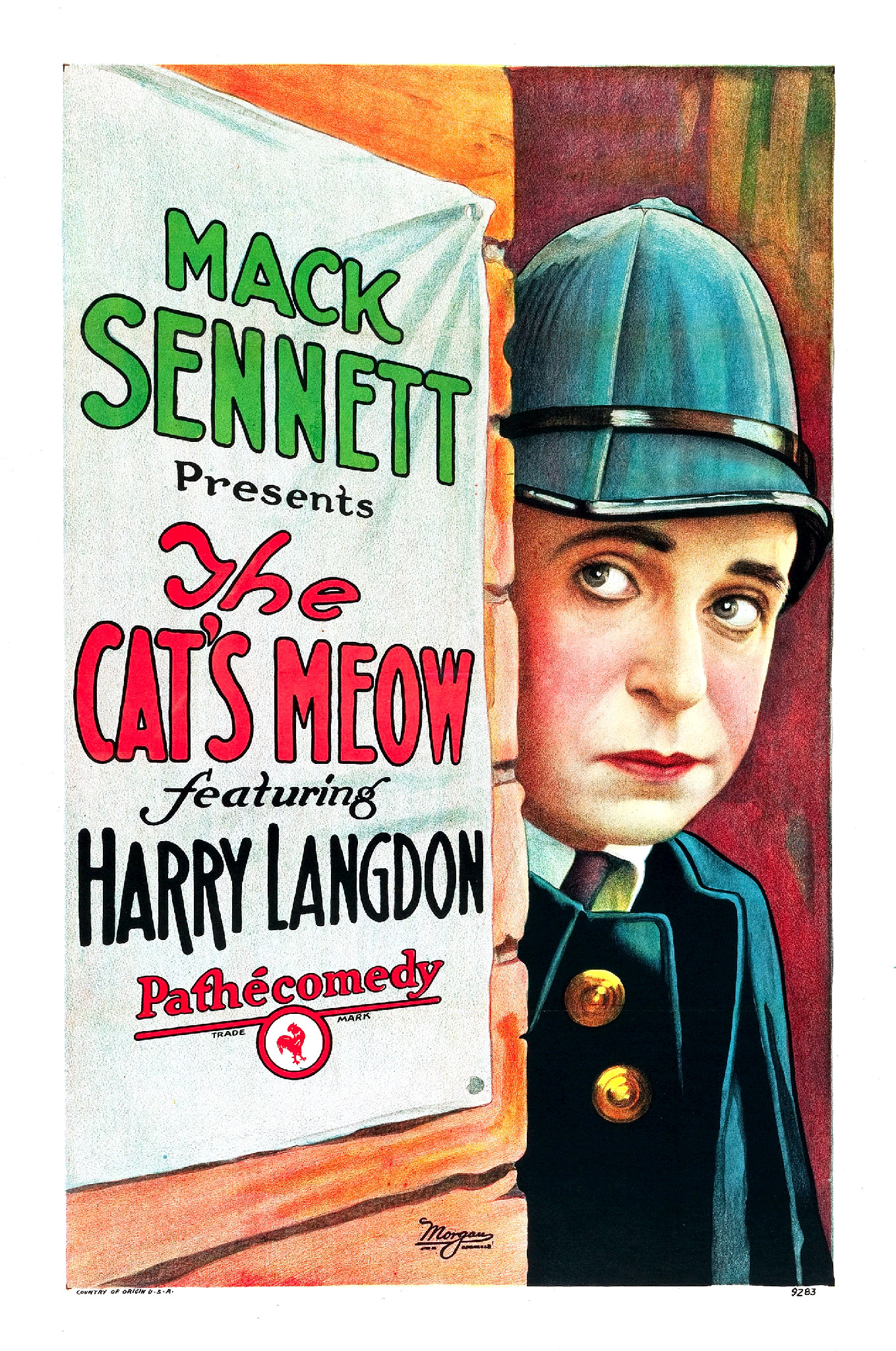
- Film poster
- Directed by: Roy Del Ruth
- Written by: John A. Waldron (titles)
- Produced by: Mack Sennett
- Starring: Harry Langdon; Alice Day
- Cinematography: William Williams; Lee Jones
- Distributed by: Pathé Exchange
- Release date: May 25, 1924
- Running time: 2 reels
- Country: United States
- Language: Silent (English intertitles)

The Cat's Meow is a 1924 American silent comedy short film directed by Roy Del Ruth and starring Harry Langdon. It was distributed through the Pathé Exchange company. Long believed lost, a print with text in Portuguese has recently been discovered.

== Cast ==
- Harry Langdon as Eddie Elgin
- Alice Day as Ida Downe
- Kalla Pasha as Bull Dakota
- Lucille Thorndyke as Mrs. Downe, Ida's Mother
- Bud Ross as Mr. Downe, Ida's Father
- Tiny Ward as Downe's Butler
- Madeline Hurlock as The Butler's Wife
- Cecille Evans as Apache Dancer
- Louise Carver as Anti-Slum Committee Woman
- Marvin Loback as Bartender
