= Duck Soup (1927 film) =

1927 short film by Fred Guiol

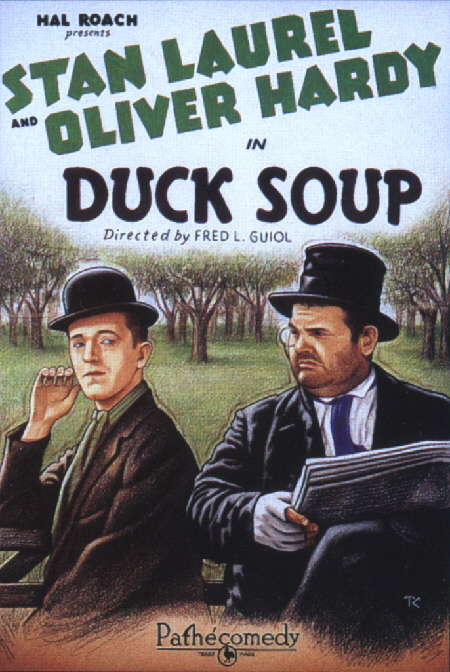
- Theatrical release poster
- Directed by: Fred Guiol
- Written by: H.M. Walker
- Based on: Home from the Honeymoon; 1908 play by Arthur J. Jefferson
- Produced by: Hal Roach
- Starring: Stan Laurel; Oliver Hardy
- Edited by: Richard C. Currier
- Distributed by: Pathé Exchange Inc.
- Release date: March 13, 1927
- Running time: 21:13
- Country: United States
- Languages: Silent film English intertitles

Full film

Duck Soup is a 1927 American silent comedy short film starring Stan Laurel and Oliver Hardy prior to their official billing as the duo Laurel and Hardy, directed by Fred Guiol.

== Plot ==
Laurel and Hardy are destitute characters trying to elude forest rangers who are rounding up vagrants to work as firefighters. Using a stolen bicycle to escape the pursuing rangers, they hide out in an empty mansion while the owner is away and the staff are gone. Exploiting the absence of the owner, who is on vacation, Hardy assumes the role of the proprietor, proffering the property for rent to an English couple.

Engaging Laurel in the ruse, he enlists him to impersonate a maid. However, their attempt at subterfuge is foiled when the rightful owner unexpectedly returns, exposing their deception to the prospective tenants. Subsequently, Laurel and Hardy are compelled to evade capture once more, but are ultimately apprehended by the forest rangers and put to work as firefighters.

== Cast ==
- Stan Laurel as James Hives/Agnes
- Oliver Hardy as Marmaduke Maltravers/fake Colonel Blood
- James A. Marcus as Colonel Blood
- William Austin as Lord Tarbotham
- Madeline Hurlock as Lady Tarbotham
- Bob Kortman as Forest Ranger McFidget
- William Courtright as Colonel Blood's butler
- Stuart Holmes

== Production notes ==
Duck Soup underwent a near half-century period of being classified as a lost film until a print resurfaced in 1974. Prior to its rediscovery, film scholars believed that Laurel and Hardy shared minimal screen time, if any. However, upon inspection, it became evident that they featured as a comedic duo throughout the entirety of the film, albeit in rudimentary tramp costumes. Hardy's portrayal included an unshaven chin, a monocle, and a top hat. The print unearthed in 1974 was a cropped 9.5mm re-release with French intertitles replacing the originals. Subsequently, a pristine full aperture 35mm nitrate print was discovered at the BFI National Archive, presumably from a British re-release. A restored version of the film, featuring a theater organ soundtrack accompaniment, was broadcast on the Movies! channel in the U.S. on December 26, 2020.

Directed by Fred Guiol, the film's significance was largely attributed to Leo McCarey, the supervising director, who recognized Laurel and Hardy's potential as a comedic pairing. McCarey would later employ the same title for the renowned Marx Brothers film, Duck Soup (1933), which he directed for Paramount Pictures. The sketch that inspired the film was penned by Stan Laurel's father, Arthur J. Jefferson.

Duck Soup was remade as Another Fine Mess (1930).
