= The Old Man's Draft =

Colloquial term for the fourth Selective Service registration in 1942

The Old Man's Draft or Old Man's Registration is the colloquial term for the fourth Selective Service registration sequence held in the United States during World War II, in April 1942. It encompassed men from the ages of 45 to 64.

== History ==
The first peacetime conscription in American history was authorized under the Selective Training and Service Act of 1940 in September 1940. This was well in advance of the country's actual entry into World War II, but in clear anticipation of the likelihood of involvement. Registration began with those aged between 21 and 35, and gradually broadened to men aged between 18 and 64 as needs increased after the country entered the war in December 1941.

On April 27, 1942, the fourth registration was held nationwide, which encompassed men from the ages of 45 to 64 (i.e., born between April 27, 1877, and February 16, 1897), earning it the nickname of "The Old Man's Draft." Unlike the earlier registrations, its purpose was indirect; the individuals were not actually liable for military service. This registration was essentially a very broad inventory of manpower and skills useful to the war effort, potentially bringing under-utilized or unemployed men back into a more fruitful occupation, and allowing for the release of easily replaceable, younger, or more fit men to fight.

The information gathered on the registration cards was basically similar to the other registrations. The front of the card included full name, place of residence (determining local board jurisdiction), mailing address, telephone number, age and date of birth, place of birth, address of a "person who will always know your address," employer's name and address, and the place of employment. The back of the card included a physical description of the registrant, with race, height, weight, complexion, "other obvious physical characteristics that will aid in identification," and a certification that the registrant and registrar attested that the answers given on the card were true.

A very large proportion of the registration cards still exist in the public record.

== Famous persons in the draft ==
- Tiny Ward
- Sgt. Alvin York

== See also ==
- Conscription in the United States
