= Picking Peaches =

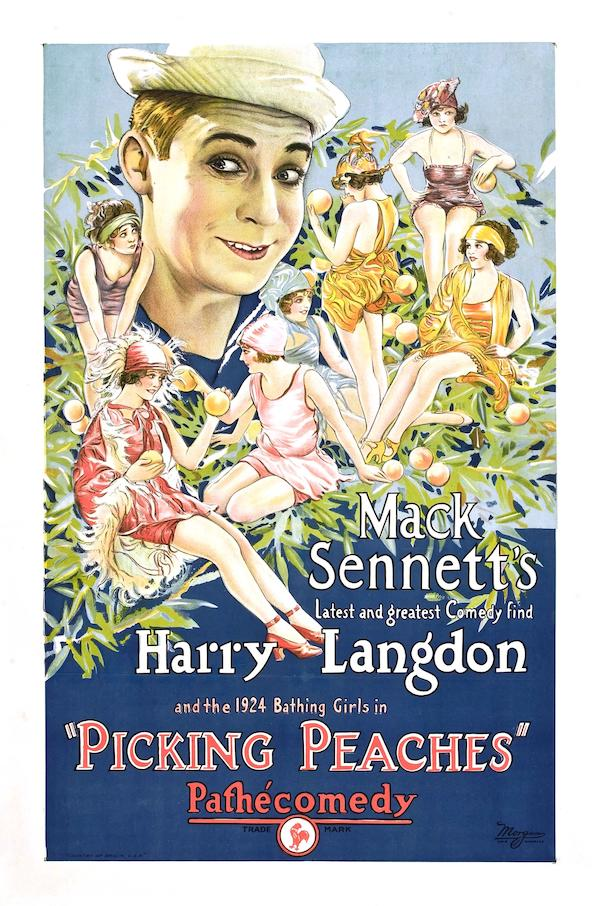
- Directed by: Erle C. Kenton
- Written by: Pinto Colvig
- Produced by: Mack Sennett
- Starring: Harry Langdon; Alberta Vaughn
- Cinematography: George Spear
- Distributed by: Pathé Exchange
- Release date: February 2, 1924
- Running time: 2 reels
- Country: USA
- Languages: Silent; English titles

Full film

Picking Peaches is a 1924 silent comedy short film produced by Mack Sennett and starring Harry Langdon. It is said to be Langdon's first film. It is listed as a surviving film.

== Cast ==
- Harry Langdon as Harry, The Shoe Clerk
- Vernon Dent as Store Manager
- Irene Lentz as Irene, Wife of Store Manager
- Alberta Vaughn as Harry's Wife
- Ethel Teare as Friend of Harry's Wife
- Dot Farley as The Customer
- Kewpie Morgan as Detective and Husband of The Customer
- Andy Clyde as Nearsighted Customer (uncredited)
- Alice Day as Secretary (uncredited)
- Marceline Day as Bathing Beauty
- Mary Akin as Bathing Beauty (uncredited)
- Jack Cooper as Beauty Contest Emcee (uncredited)
- Dorothy Dorr as Bathing Beauty (uncredited)
- Cecille Evans as Contestant Who Makes Bad Dive (uncredited)
- Evelyn Francisco as Bathing Beauty (uncredited)
- Eugenia Gilbert as Bathing Beauty (uncredited)
- Thelma Hill as Contestant with Blackened Tooth (uncredited)
- Si Jenks as Beauty Contestant Scorekeeper (uncredited)
- Roger Moore as Beauty Contestant Spectator (uncredited)
- Leo Sulky as Fashion Show Judge (uncredited)
- Elsie Tarron as Bathing Beauty (uncredited)
- Gladys Tennyson as Bathing Beauty (uncredited)
- Tiny Ward as Angry Man in Dressing Gown (uncredited)
- Hazel Williams as Bathing Beauty (uncredited)
