= Selective Training and Service Act of 1940 =

U.S. law providing for WWII conscription

Selective Service Act of 1940
- Other short titles: Burke-Wadsworth Selective Training and Service Act; Selective Service Act of 1940
- Long title: An Act to provide for the common defense by increasing the personnel of the armed forces of the United States and providing for its training.
- Nicknames: Burke–Wadsworth Act
- Enacted by: the 76th United States Congress
- Effective: September 16, 1940, Armand

Citations
- Public law: 76-783
- Statutes at Large: 54 Stat. 885, Chapter 720

Codification
- Titles amended: 50 U.S.C.: War and National Defense
- U.S.C. sections created: 50 U.S.C. Appendix § 301 et seq.

Legislative history
- Introduced in the Senate as S. 4164 by Edward R. Burke (D–NE), James W. Wadsworth Jr. (R–NY); Passed the Senate on August 28, 1940 (58–31); Passed the House on September 7, 1940 (263–149, in lieu of H.R. 10132); Reported by the joint conference committee on September 14, 1940; agreed to by the House on September 14, 1940 (233–124) and by the Senate on September 14, 1940 (47–25); Signed into law by President Franklin D. Roosevelt on September 16, 1940

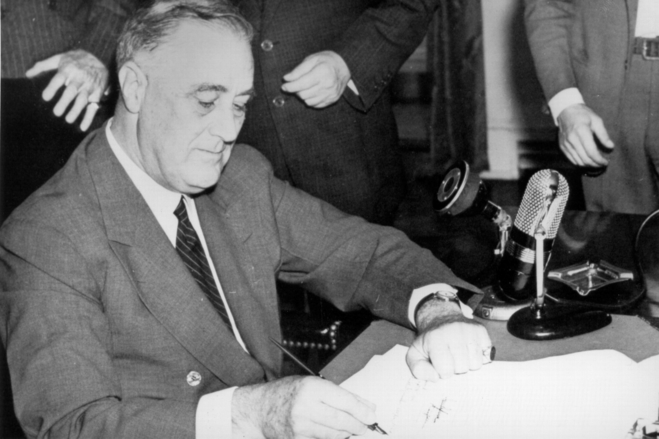
President Franklin D. Roosevelt signs the Selective Training and Service Act.

The Selective Training and Service Act of 1940, also known as the Burke–Wadsworth Act, Pub. L. 76–783, 54 Stat. 885, enacted September 16, 1940, was the first peacetime conscription in United States history. This Selective Service Act required that men who had reached their 21st birthday but had not yet reached their 36th birthday register with local draft boards. Later, when the U.S. entered World War II, all men from their 18th birthday until the day before their 45th birthday were made subject to military service, and all men from their 18th birthday until the day before their 65th birthday were required to register.

== Effects of the Act ==
=== Parameters ===
The first peacetime conscription in the United States, the act required all American men between the ages of 21 and 35 to register and be placed in order for call to military service determined by a national lottery. If drafted, a man served on active duty for 12 months, and then in a reserve component for 10 years, until he reached the age of 45, or was discharged, whichever came first. Inductees had to remain in the Western Hemisphere or in United States possessions or territories located in other parts of the world. The act provided that except in time of war, not more than 900,000 men were to be in training at any one time.

Section 5 (g) of the Act contained a provision for conscientious objection:

Nothing contained in this Act shall be constructed to require any person to be subject to combatant training and service in the land and naval forces of the United States who, by reason of religious training and belief, is conscientiously opposed to participation in war in any form.

Any such person claiming such exemption from combatant training and service because of such conscientious objections whose claim is sustained by the local draft board shall, if he is inducted into the land or naval forces under this Act, be assigned to noncombatant service as defined by the President, or shall if he is found to be conscientiously opposed to participation in such noncombatant service, in lieu of such induction, be assigned to work of national importance under civilian direction.

== World War II draft ==
The draft began with the first registration on October 16, 1940, and the first men entered military service on November 18. By the early summer of 1941, President Franklin D. Roosevelt asked the U.S. Congress to extend the term of duty for the draftees beyond twelve months to a total of thirty months, plus any additional time that he might deem necessary for national security. On August 12, the United States House of Representatives approved the extension by a single vote; Roosevelt's former Secretary of War Harry Woodring was among those opposed, writing to Senator Arthur Vandenberg that voluntary enlistment had not been fully tried. As Under Secretary of the Army Karl R. Bendetsen said in an oral history interview, "Mr. Rayburn banged the gavel at a critical moment and declared the Bill had passed." The Senate approved it by a wider margin, and Roosevelt signed the Service Extension Act of 1941 into law on August 18.

Some of the soldiers drafted in October 1940 talked about desertion once their original twelve-month obligation ended. Some painted the letters "O H I O" on the walls of their barracks in protest. These letters were an acronym for "Over the hill in October". In August 1941 the Congress extended the tour of duty--it passed the House by a one-vote margin--and O H I O collapsed. Following the Japanese attack on Pearl Harbor, on December 7, 1941, millions of American men entered the United States military's ranks both by volunteering and by conscription.

Congress declared war in December, and amendments to the Selective Training and Service Act on December 20, 1941, made all men between the ages of 20 and 44 liable for military service, and required all men between the ages of 18 and 64 to register. The terminal point of service was extended to the duration of the conflict plus six months. Another amendment, signed on November 13, 1942, made the registered 18- and 19-year-olds liable for military service.

On April 27, 1942, the fourth registration was held nationwide, which encompassed men from the ages of 45 to 64 (i.e., born between April 27, 1877, and February 16, 1897), earning it the nickname of "The Old Man's Draft". Unlike the earlier registrations, its purpose was indirect; the individuals were not actually liable for military service. This registration was essentially a very broad inventory of manpower and skills useful to the war effort, potentially bringing under-utilized or unemployed men back into a more fruitful occupation, and allowing for the release of easily replaceable, younger, or more fit men to fight.

From October 1940 until March 1947, when the wartime Selective Training and Service Act expired after extensions by Congress, over 10,000,000 men were inducted.

== Draft classifications ==
=== Class I: Available for military service ===
Class	Description	Date established	Date abolished
I-A	Nominally available for military service.	Oct 4, 1940	Mar 31, 1947
I-A (B)	Nominally available for limited military service, but below standards for general military service.	May 26, 1945	Nov 27, 1946
I-A (H)	Nominally available for military service, age 38 to 44 inclusive.	Mar 6, 1943	Oct 5, 1944
I-A (L)	Nominally available for limited military service.	Jul 15, 1943	Oct 5, 1944
I-A, Remediable	Nominally available for military service after correction of defects.	Feb 26, 1942	Oct 18, 1942
I-A-O	Nominally available for noncombatant military service (conscientious objector).	Oct 4, 1940	Mar 31, 1947
I-A-O (B)	Nominally available for limited military service, but below standards for general military service (conscientious objector and applicable to ages 18 to 25 only).	May 26, 1945	Oct 27, 1946
I-A-O (H)	Nominally available for noncombatant military service, age 38 to 44 inclusive.	Mar 6, 1943	Oct 5, 1944
I-A-O (L)	Nominally available for noncombatant limited military service (conscientious objector).	Jul 15, 1943	Oct 5, 1944
I-A-O, Remediable	Nominally available for noncombatant military service after correction of defects (conscientious objector).	Feb 26, 1942	Aug 18, 1942
I-B	Nominally available for limited military service.	Oct 4, 1940	Aug 18, 1942
I-B, Remediable	Nominally available for limited military service after correction of defects.	Oct 4, 1940	Aug 18, 1942
I-B-O	Conscientious objector nominally available for limited noncombatant military service.	Oct 4, 1940	Aug 18, 1942
I-B-O, Remediable	Nominally available for limited noncombatant military service after correction of defects.	Oct 4, 1940	Aug 18, 1942
I-C, Inducted	Inducted member of armed forces.	Oct 4, 1940	Aug 31, 1947
I-C, Enlisted	Enlisted member of armed forces.	Oct 4, 1940	Aug 31, 1947
I-C, Discharged	Discharged (honorably) from the armed forces.	Oct 5, 1944	Aug 31, 1947
I-C Deceased	Deceased while in Class I-C.	Apr 21, 1944	Aug 31, 1947
I-C (H)	Enlisted or inducted member of armed forces, age 38 to 44 inclusive.	Mar 6, 1944	Aug 31, 1947
I-D	Deferred student, nominally available for general military service and available not later than July 1, 1941.	Oct 4, 1940	Aug 31, 1941
I-D-O	Deferred student, nominally available for general noncombatant military service.	Oct 4, 1940	Aug 31, 1941
I-E	Deferred student, nominally available for limited military service and available not later than July 1, 1941.	Oct 4, 1940	Aug 31, 1941
I-E-O	Deferred student, nominally available for limited noncombatant military service.	Oct 4, 1940	Aug 31, 1941
I-G	Member of or honorably separated from armed forces of cobelligerent nation, later extended to include registrants separated from American Field Service or Merchant Marine and persons interned by an enemy nation.	May 23, 1945	Aug 31, 1947
I-H	Deferred, aged 28 and over (men who had attained the 28th anniversary of the date of their birth on or before July 1, 1941, or on the 1st day of July of any subsequent year, and were therefore, not acceptable to the armed forces).	Aug 31, 1941	Nov 18, 1942

=== Class II: Deferred because of occupation ===
Class	Description	Date established	Date abolished
II-A	Deferred in support of national health, safety, or interest (merged into Class II-B effective August 31, 1945).	Oct 4, 1940	Aug 31, 1945
II-A (F)	II-A previously rejected for military service.	Apr 21, 1944	Nov 27, 1946
II-A (H)	Deferred in support of national health, safety, or interest, age 38 to 44 inclusive.	Mar 6, 1943	Oct 5, 1944
II-A (L)	II-A previously found qualified for limited military service	Apr 21, 1944	Feb 15, 1946
II-B	Deferred in war production.	Oct 4, 1940	Mar 31, 1947
II-B (F)	II-B previously rejected for military service.	Apr 21, 1944	Aug 31, 1945
II-B (H)	Deferred in war production, age 38 to 44 inclusive.	Mar 6, 1943	Oct 5, 1944
II-B (L)	II-B previously found qualified for limited military service.	Apr 21, 1944	Aug 31, 1945
II-C	Deferred in agriculture.	Nov 18, 1942	Mar 31, 1947
II-C (F)	II-C previously rejected for military service.	Apr 21, 1944	Nov 27, 1946
II-C (H)	Deferred in agriculture, age 38 to 44 inclusive.	Mar 6, 1943	Oct 5, 1944
II-C (L)	II-C previously found qualified for limited military service.	Apr 21, 1944	Feb 15, 1946

=== Class III: Deferred because of dependency ===
Class	Description	Date established	Date abolished
III-A	Deferred for dependency reasons (re-established November 15, 1945).	Oct 4, 1940	Dec 11, 1943
III-A (H)	Deferred for dependency reasons. age 38 to 44 inclusive.	Mar 6, 1943	Dec 11, 1943
III-B	Deferred both by reason of dependency and occupation essential to the war effort.	Apr 23, 1942	Apr 12, 1943
III-B (H)	Deferred both by reason of dependency and occupation essential to the war effort, age 38 to 44 inclusive.	Mar 6, 1943	Apr 12, 1943
III-C	Deferred both by reason of dependency and by agricultural occupation.	Nov 18, 1942	Feb 17, 1944
III-C (H)	Deferred both by reason of dependency and by agricultural occupation, age 38 to 44 inclusive.	Mar 6, 1943	Oct 5, 1944
III-D	Deferred by reason of extreme hardship and privation to wife, child, or parent.	Apr 12, 1943	Mar 31, 1947
III-D (H)	Deferred by reason of extreme hardship and privation to wife, child, or parent, age 38 to 44 inclusive.	Apr 12, 1943	Oct 5, 1944

=== Class IV: Unacceptable for military service ===
Class	Description	Date established	Date abolished
IV-A	Man who had completed service. This classification was applicable in time of peace only, and on December 11, 1941, local boards were ordered to reclassify all men in this class.	Oct 4, 1940	Nov 8, 1942
IV-A	A reappearance of the old IV-A, this time for men deferred by reason of age. From November 18, 1942, to October 5, 1944, men 45 and older were classified in Class IV-A. From January 1, 1943, men 38 to 44 years old were classified in Class IV-H. The latter class was eliminated on March 6, 1943, with the introduction of the "(H)" identifier. On October 5, 1944, the "(H)" identifier was eliminated, except for men already in the armed forces, and those men so classified were ordered reclassified into Class IV-A. On July 6, 1945, the regulations governing Class IV-A were simplified to include all men 38 and older.	Nov 18, 1942	Mar 31, 1947
IV-B	Public official deferred by law.	Oct 4, 1940	Mar 31, 1947
IV-B (H)	Public official deferred by law, age 38 to 44 inclusive,	Mar 6, 1943	Oct 5, 1944
IV-C	Any alien.	Oct 4, 1940	Dec 24, 1941
IV-C	Reconstructed for enemy alien not acceptable to armed forces and certain neutral aliens.	Dec 4, 1941	Mar 31, 1947
IV-C	Any registrant, whether a national of the United States or an alien who because of his nationality or ancestry was within a class of persons not acceptable to armed forces or to Director of Selective Service for work of national importance.	Oct 4, 1940	Mar 31, 1947
IV-C (H)	Any registrant, whether a national of the United States or an alien who because of his nationality or ancestry was within a class of persons not acceptable to armed forces or to Director of Selective Service for work of national importance, age 38 to 44 inclusive.	Mar 6, 1943	Oct 5, 1944
IV-D	Minister of religion or divinity student.	Oct 4, 1940	Mar 31, 1947
IV-D (H)	Minister of religion or divinity student, age 38 to 44 inclusive.	Mar 6, 1943	Oct 5, 1944
IV-E	Conscientious objector, available for or assigned to civilian work of national importance.	Oct 4, 1940	Mar 31, 1947
IV-E (B)	Conscientious objector, under 26 years of age, acceptable under lowered physical standards for work of national importance.	May 26, 1945	Nov 27, 1946
IV-E, Deceased	Deceased while in Class IV-E.	Apr 21, 1944	Mar 31, 1947
IV-E, Discharged	Conscientious objector separated from work of national importance by issuance of a Certificate of Release.	Nov 4, 1944	Mar 31, 1947
IV-E-H	Conscientious objector, deferred by reason of being 28 and over.	Aug 31, 1941	Nov 19, 1942
IV-E (H)	Conscientious objector, available for or assigned to civilian work of national importance, age 38 to 44 inclusive.	Mar 6, 1943	Oct 5, 1944
IV-E (L)	Conscientious objector qualified for limited service.	Jul 6, 1944	Oct 5, 1944
IV-E-LS	Conscientious objector available for limited service in civilian work of national importance.	Aug 31, 1941	Aug 18, 1942
IV-E-S	Conscientious objector who would otherwise be in Class I-D or I-E.	Oct 4, 1940	Aug 31, 1941
IV-E, Separated	Conscientious objector separated from work of national importance other than by issuance of a Certificate of Release.	Apr 21, 1944	Mar 31, 1947
IV-F	Rejected for military service, physical, mental, or moral reasons.	Oct 4, 1940	Mar 31, 1947
IV-F (H)	Rejected for military service, physical, mental, or moral reasons, and age 38 to 44 inclusive.	Mar 6, 1943	Oct 5, 1944
IV-H	Deferred, age 38 to 44 inclusive.	Jan 1, 1943	Mar 6, 1943

== Pardons ==
In 1947, President Harry S. Truman gave a full pardon to 1,523 people convicted of violating the Act.

== See also ==
- Military Selective Service Act of 1948
- Civilian Public Service
