= Another Fine Mess =

1930 short film by James Parrott

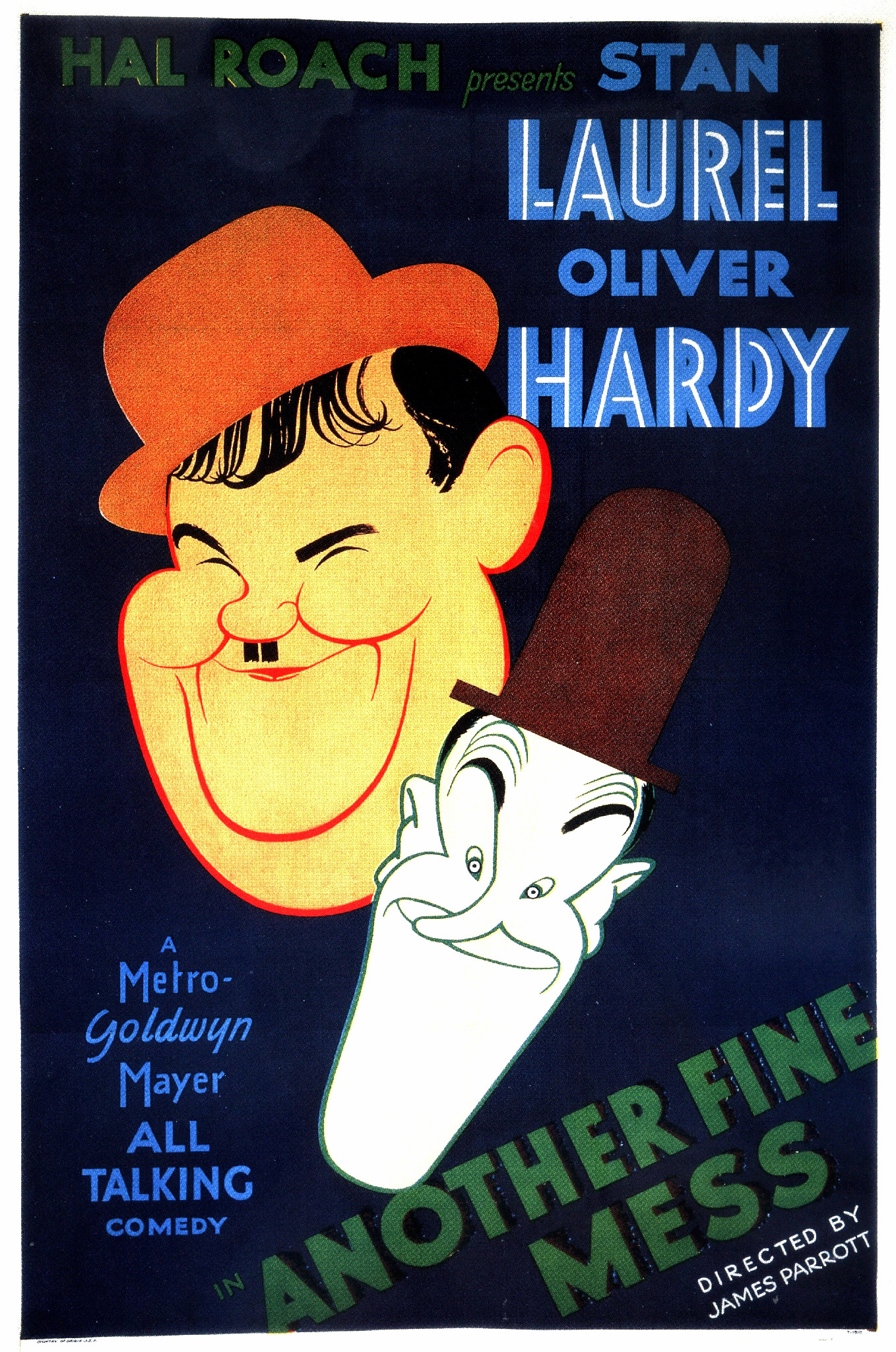
- Theatrical release poster
- Directed by: James Parrott
- Written by: H.M. Walker
- Based on: Home from the Honeymoon; 1908 play by Arthur J. Jefferson
- Produced by: Hal Roach
- Starring: Stan Laurel; Oliver Hardy
- Cinematography: Jack Stevens
- Edited by: Richard C. Currier
- Music by: Leroy Shield
- Distributed by: Metro-Goldwyn-Mayer
- Release date: November 29, 1930
- Running time: 27:41
- Country: United States
- Language: English

Another Fine Mess is a 1930 short comedy film directed by James Parrott and starring Laurel and Hardy. It is based on the 1908 play Home from the Honeymoon by Arthur J. Jefferson, Stan Laurel's father, and is a remake of their 1927 silent film (and debut as an "official" duo) Duck Soup.

== Plot ==
Stan Laurel and Oliver Hardy find themselves pursued by a tenacious police officer, initially misidentified as vagrants loitering in a park. A comical altercation ensues when Stan inadvertently provokes the officer by addressing him as "ma'am," further escalating the situation. Seeking refuge from their pursuer, the duo takes shelter in the basement of a mansion belonging to the eccentric English adventurer Colonel Wilburforce Buckshot, currently vacant due to Buckshot's African hunting expedition. Unbeknownst to them, the mansion's butler and maid have clandestinely absconded for a holiday, leaving the premises unoccupied.

Their sanctuary is short-lived as a wealthy couple, Lady and Lord Plumtree (who are also English), arrive seeking to rent the mansion. In a bid to evade detection, Oliver devises a scheme, compelling Stan to impersonate the absent butler under the guise of "Hives." However, confronted with the persistent presence of the officer, Stan adopts a strategy of prolonging their interaction to divert attention, inadvertently endearing themselves to the Plumtrees.

The plot thickens when the real Colonel Buckshot unexpectedly returns, discovering the ensuing chaos. Mistaken for burglars, Stan and Oliver are forced to flee into a closet, prompting Buckshot to summon the police. In a frenzied escape, the duo dons eccentric disguises and absconds on a stolen tandem bicycle, pursued by both law enforcement and Buckshot. A madcap pursuit ensues, culminating in a fortuitous encounter with a passing tram that dismantles their bicycle, leading to an emergence astride unicycles as they pedal toward an uncertain conclusion.

== Cast ==
Credited

- Stan Laurel as Stan
- Oliver Hardy as Ollie

Uncredited

- Harry Bernard as policeman
- Bobby Burns as bicyclist
- Betty Mae Crane as talking titles
- Beverly Crane as talking titles
- Eddie Dunn as Meadows
- James Finlayson as Colonel Wilburforce Buckshot
- Thelma Todd as Lady Plumtree
- Charles K. Gerrard as Lord Leopold Ambrose Plumtree
- Bill Knight as policeman
- Bob Mimford as policeman
- Gertrude Sutton as Agnes the maid

== Production ==
The film's technical credits are recited by two girls in usherette outfits at the beginning of the film. Beverly and Betty Mae Crane performed the "talking titles" for several Hal Roach productions during the 1930–31 season as an experimental alternative to standard title cards.

Another Fine Mess is the first Laurel and Hardy film to feature background music by Leroy Shield. Several previous Laurel and Hardy sound shorts experimented with music scores, but beginning with this film, music would be heard regularly in Laurel and Hardy, Our Gang and Charley Chase shorts and other Hal Roach productions such as The Boy Friends. Although some contemporaneous Laurel and Hardy films were also produced in foreign-language versions, with dialogue spoken phonetically, none are known to exist for Another Fine Mess.

== See also ==
- List of American films of 1930
