= West of Zanzibar (1928 film) =

1928 film by Tod Browning

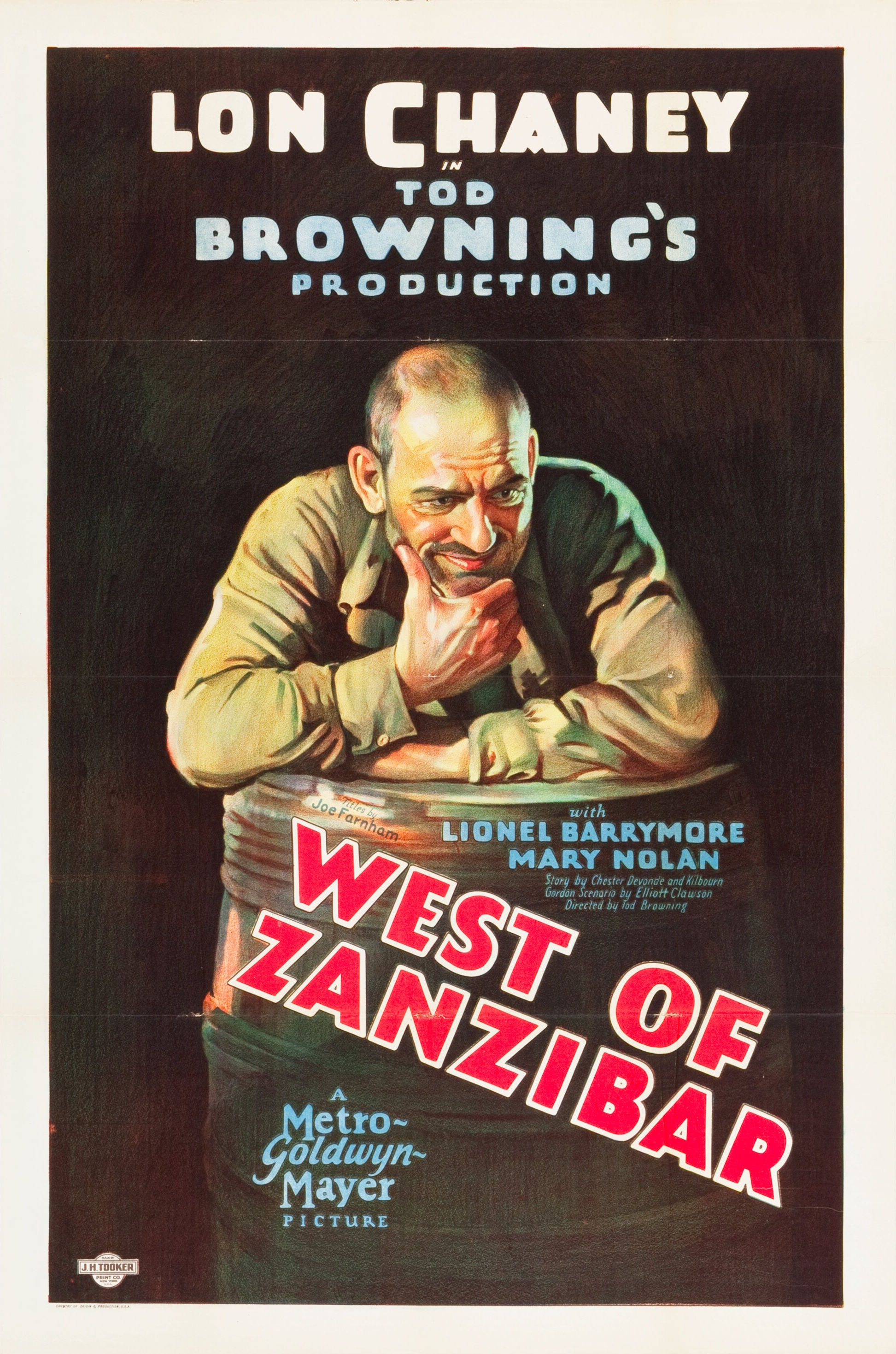
- Theatrical release poster
- Directed by: Tod Browning; Harry Sharrock (A.D.)
- Written by: Elliott J. Clawson (screenplay); Joseph Farnham (intertitles)
- Based on: Kongo; 1926 play by Charles de Vonde and Kilbourn Gordon
- Produced by: Irving G. Thalberg
- Starring: Lon Chaney; Lionel Barrymore; Mary Nolan; Warner Baxter; Kalla Pasha
- Cinematography: Percy Hilburn
- Edited by: Harry Reynolds
- Music by: William Axt
- Distributed by: MGM; Jury-Metro-Goldwyn (England)
- Release date: November 24, 1928
- Running time: 65 minutes
- Country: United States
- Languages: Sound film (synchronized) (English intertitles)

West of Zanzibar is a 1928 American synchronized sound film directed by Tod Browning. While the film has no audible dialog, it was released with a synchronized musical score with sound effects using both the sound-on-disc and sound-on-film process. The screenplay concerns a vengeful stage magician named Phroso (Lon Chaney) who becomes paralyzed in a brawl with a rival (Lionel Barrymore). The supporting cast includes Mary Nolan and Warner Baxter. The screenplay was written by Elliott J. Clawson, based on the 1926 play Kongo by Charles de Vonde and Kilbourn Gordon. Walter Huston starred in the stage play and later played Phroso again in the 1932 sound film remake of the same story which was also called Kongo.

The Hays office, the official Hollywood censor, banned the stage play "Kongo" from the screen, so to bypass the ruling, MGM changed the title first to South of the Equator, then finally to West of Zanzibar. Owen Moore was originally set to play Doc, but the role went to Warner Baxter instead. Mary Nolan was hired to play Maizie because she had "such sad eyes". Cedric Gibbons and Richard Day designed the sets, and David Cox handled the costumes.

West of Zanzibar is intriguing to Lon Chaney fans because of the lost or excised sequences that Browning allegedly shot for the film that no longer exist; in particular, Phroso (Chaney) in costume as The Human Duck in a freak show act and scenes showing Phroso and his troupe when they first arrive in Africa. Stills of Chaney in the duck costume exist, but it is unclear whether the scene was actually shot, or merely planned and publicity stills were taken.

The film was in production from June 25, 1928 to July 31, 1928, and cost $249,000 to produce. Its worldwide box office gross was $921,000. The film was released both silent and with sound effects and a synchronized music score.

Film historian Jon C. Mirsalis wrote that Waldemar Young was involved in writing the screenplay (but no other sources mention him) and that the film was released on December 28, 1928 instead of November 24th. Stills exist showing Chaney as the crippled Phroso.

MGM Home Video released the film with the synchronized music score on laser disc in 1993. It was released on DVD in 2012 as part of the Warner Archive Collection, using the same video master. The film also turns up frequently on the Turner Classics Movies cable TV channel and on PBS stations. Print exists in the George Eastman Museum film archive [35mm positive].

== Plot ==
West of Zanzibar (1928)

Anna cannot bring herself to tell her professional magician husband, The Great Phroso, that she is leaving him. Her lover, an ivory trader named Crane, informs Phroso that he is taking Anna away with him to Africa, and when an argument ensues, Crane pushes the distraught husband away from him so forcefully that he falls over a railing and is crippled, losing the use of his legs.

After leaving the hospital, Phroso learns to get around the neighborhood by propelling himself on a small wooden platform. After a year, he learns that Anna has returned from Africa apparently because Crane tired of her and threw her out. He finds his wife dead from starvation in a church, with a baby beside her. He swears to avenge himself on both Crane and the child. He adopts the child and moves to Africa with her.

Eighteen years later, Phroso (nicknamed "Dead-Legs" Flint) rules over a small outpost inhabited by "Doc", Babe, Tiny and a native named Bumbu in the depths of the African jungle. Through his magic tricks, Phroso dominates the local natives who call him the "White Voodoo". He has his men steal ivory repeatedly from Crane by having Tiny dress up as an evil voodoo spirit to frighten away Crane's black porters. Meanwhile, Phroso sends Babe to bring back a blonde prostitute named Maizie from the "lowest dive in Zanzibar", where for years Phroso has had her raised. She is told only that she will finally get to meet her father.

When she arrives, Phroso denies being Maisie's father (to her great relief), but refuses to tell her why she has been brought there and treats her with undisguised hatred. The first night, she witnesses a gruesome tribal custom: when a man dies, his wife or daughter is burned alive on the same funeral pyre. As the days go by, Maizie gradually wins the perpetually drunk Doc's heart. However, Phroso purposely turns her into an alcoholic.

Phroso then sends word to Crane where he can find the people who are robbing his ivory. When Crane shows up and sees Maizie, Phroso tells him that Maizie is his daughter. To Phroso's surprise, Crane breaks out in laughter. He informs Phroso that Anna never went with him to Africa because she hated him for paralyzing her husband. Maizie is actually Phroso's child! Before he can absorb the news, the next step of his plan unfolds; the natives shoot and kill Crane. Now that Crane has been killed, custom demands that his daughter Maisie be burned with him on his funeral pyre.

Realizing now that she is actually his daughter, Phroso uses a magic trick to try to save Maisie from being burned alive. With the natives watching, he puts her in an upright wooden coffin with a secret exit in the back and closes the lid. When he reopens it, there is nothing but a skeleton inside. Meanwhile, Doc, Maizie and the others flee down to the river and escape by boat. However, the natives do not believe Phroso's claim that an evil spirit has taken Maizie; they realize he has tricked them. The screen fades to black as the natives close in on Phroso. Later, a native fishes a medallion out of the ashes of the funeral pyre, the same medallion that had hung around Phroso's neck. Meanwhile, Doc and Maizie in each other's arms, among others, safely escape down the river in a boat.

== Cast ==
- Lon Chaney as Phroso ("Dead-Legs" Flint)
- Lionel Barrymore as Crane
- Mary Nolan as Maizie
- Warner Baxter as Doc
- Jacqueline Gadsden as Anna (as "Jane Daly")
- Tiny Ward as Tiny
- Kalla Pasha as Babe
- Curtis Nero as Bumbu
- Rose Dione as Zanzibar Club Owner (uncredited)
- Louise Emmons as Old Woman on Street (uncredited)
- Fred Gamble as Vaudeville Comedian (uncredited)
- Dick Sutherland as Cannibal (uncredited)
- Edna Tichenor as Dancing Girl in Zanzibar Club (scene cut from film)
- Dan Wolheim as Man in Bar (scene cut from film)
- Zalla Zarana as Woman in Zanzibar Bar (uncredited)
- Emmett King as Stage Manager
- Chaz Chase as Stage Performer
- Art Winkler as Phroso's assistant
- Mae Busch
- Ida May
- Richard Cummings

== Reception ==
The film received reviews from critics at the time, with some disparaging the gruesome acting from Lon Chaney while others praised the high energy and clear popularity with audiences at the time.

In a much more recent review, Dennis Schwartz described it as a "strangely curious relic", but praised the "virtuoso performance of Chaney".

== See also ==
- List of early sound feature films (1926–1929)
