= Tramp, Tramp, Tramp =

1926 film by Frank Capra

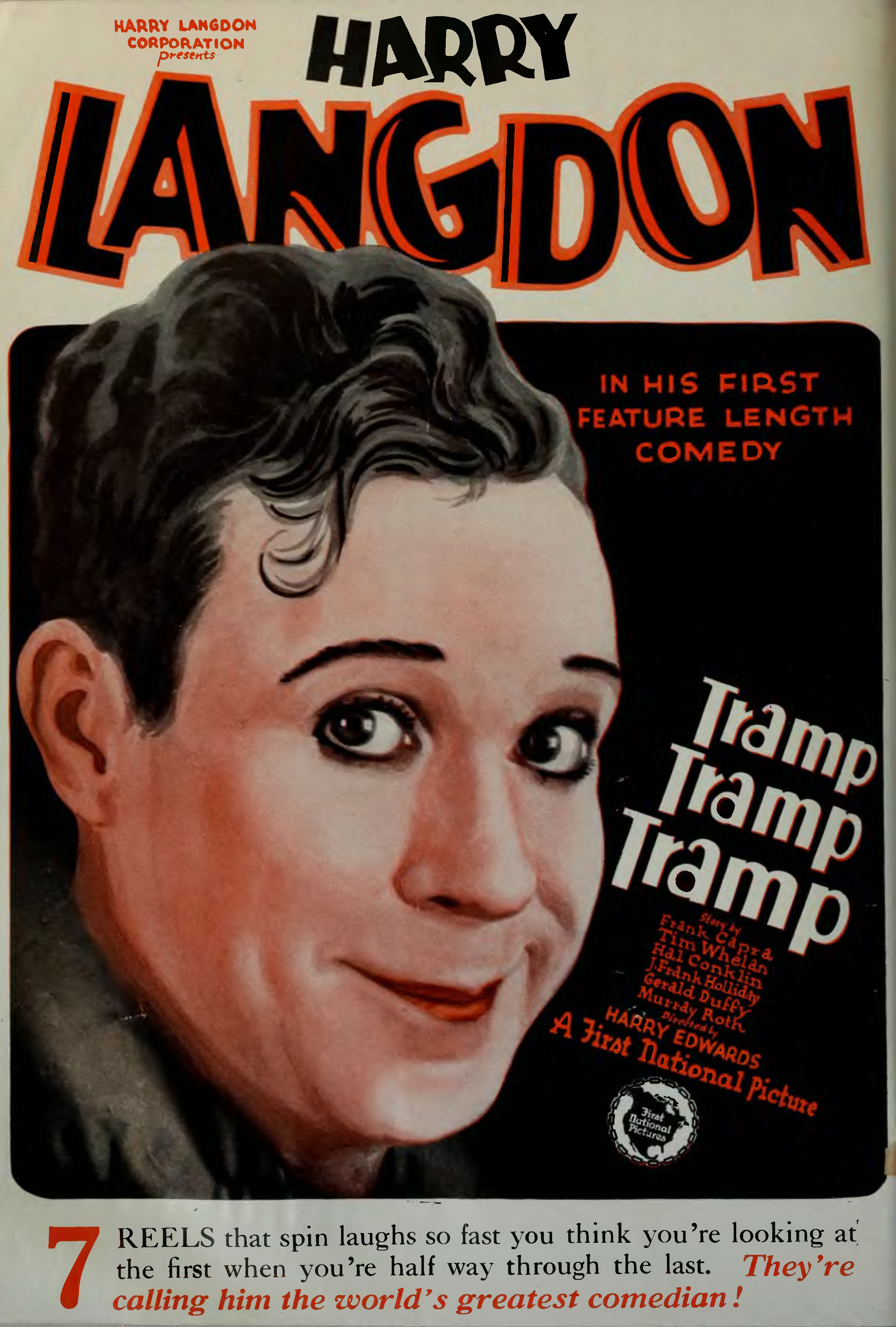
- Ad in The Film Daily, 1926
- Directed by: Harry Edwards
- Written by: Frank Capra
- Produced by: Harry Langdon
- Starring: Harry Langdon; Joan Crawford
- Cinematography: Elgin Lessley; George Spear
- Production company: Harry Langdon Corporation
- Distributed by: First National Pictures
- Release date: March 21, 1926 (United States)
- Running time: 62 minutes
- Country: United States
- Language: Silent (English intertitles)

Tramp, Tramp, Tramp is a 1926 American silent comedy film directed by Harry Edwards and starring Harry Langdon and Joan Crawford.

== Plot ==
Tramp, Tramp, Tramp (1926)

Harry is a ne'er-do-well who falls in love with Betty, a girl on a billboard. Harry participates in a cross country foot race hoping to win prize money in hopes of marrying her.

Harry wins the race when a tornado strikes near the finish line. Harry is so innocently oblivious to it that he simply walks through the disaster while the other contestants run for cover.

== Cast ==
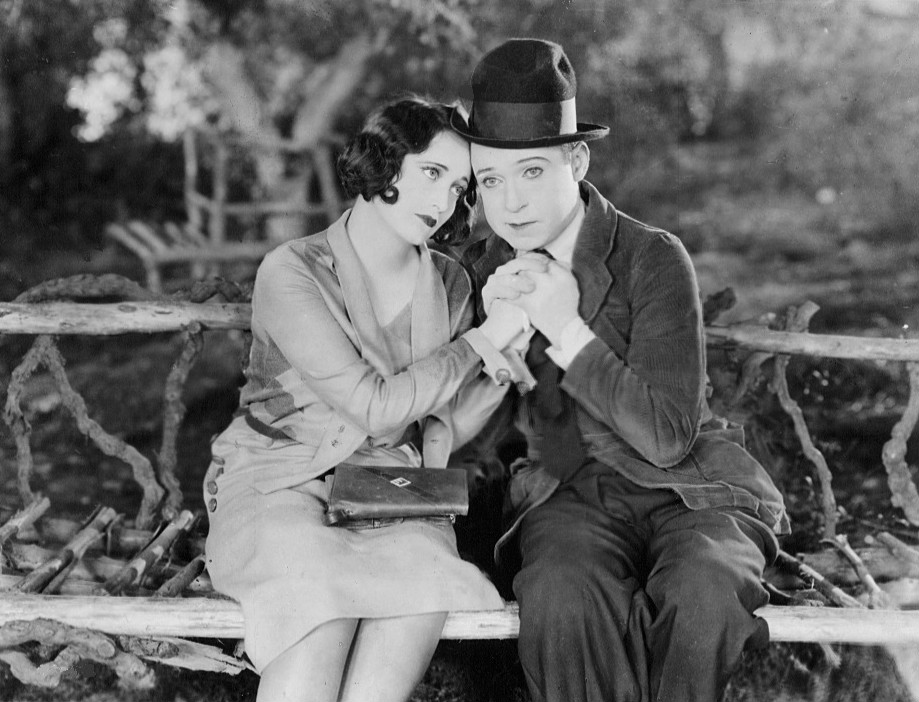
Still with Joan Crawford and Harry Langdon

- Harry Langdon as Harry
- Joan Crawford as Betty Burton
- Edwards Davis as John Burton
- Tom Murray as Nick Kargas
- Alec B. Francis as Amos Logan
- Brooks Benedict as Taxi Driver
- Carlton Griffin as Roger Caldwell (uncredited)
- George Marion as Man in Crowd (uncredited)

== Preservation ==
16mm and 35mm prints are held in the George Eastman Museum. The film was released on DVD by Kino.

== Critical reception ==
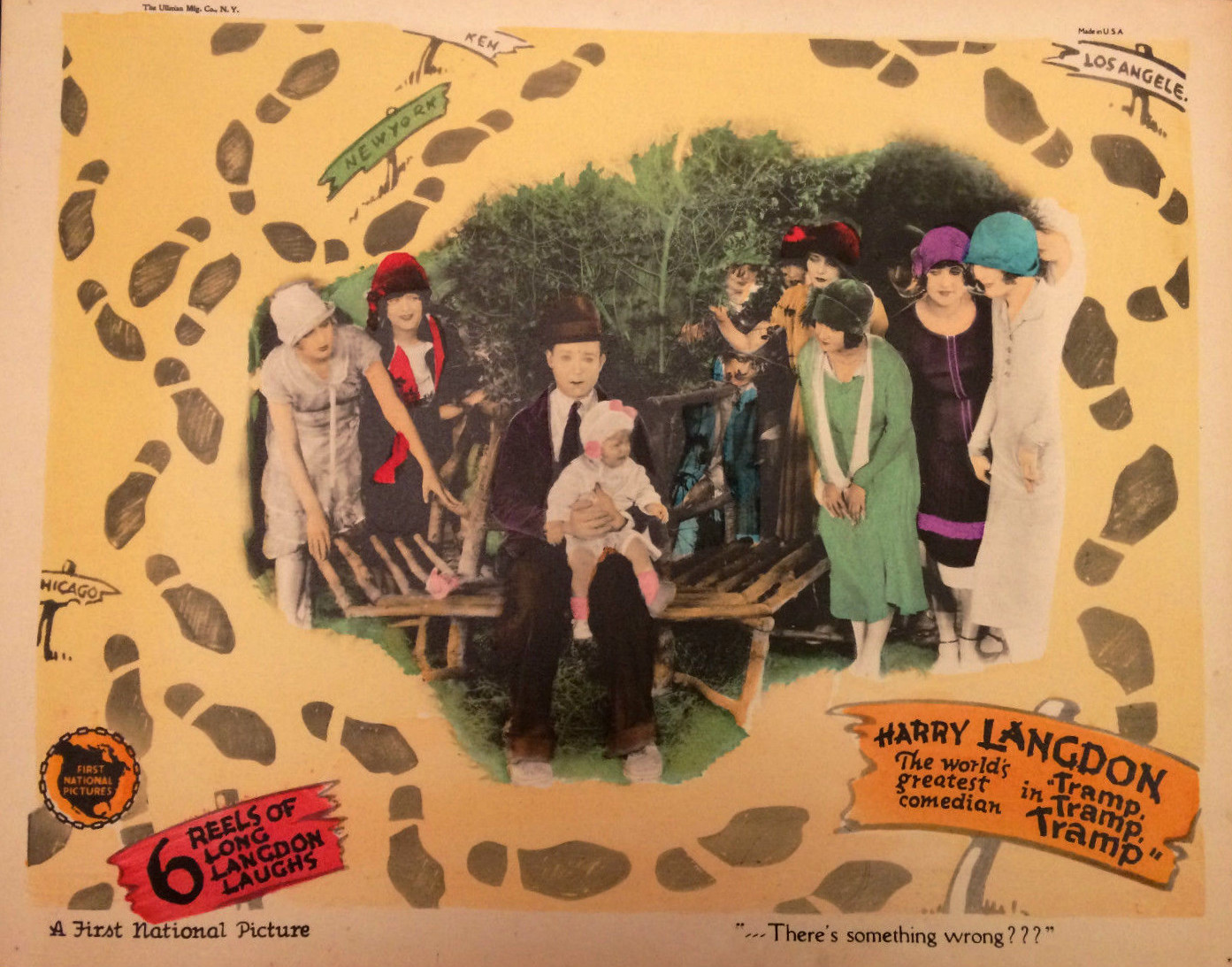
Tramp, Tramp, Tramp lobby card, 1926

In a 2002 review of the film, critic Maria Schneider wrote, "Langdon was most often cast as an oblivious innocent adrift in a corrupt world, a formula that made him terrifically popular in the mid-1920s... An acquired taste, Harry Langdon's gentle absurdities and slow rhythms take some getting used to, but patient viewers will be rewarded."

The staff at TV Guide gave the film a mixed review, writing, "An amusing and sunny outdoor comedy, Tramp, Tramp, Tramp seems weak only in comparison with Langdon's next feature, The Strong Man (1926), a much richer blend of laughs, thrills, and tears. Among the earlier film's deficiencies is an anemic story. The bulk of the movie is devoted to little more than a succession of pickles Harry gets himself into on his way west. Nothing is made of the fact that the Logans' landlord and the world walking champion are the same man. (If one isn't paying close attention, one may not be sure that they are the same man). And someone should have thought up a more humorous or exciting way for Harry to win the marathon; a viewer's reconstruction of the script would simply note that 'Harry wins the race.'"

== See also ==
- List of United States comedy films
