= Breaking Into Society =

1923 film

- Directed by: Hunt Stromberg
- Written by: Hunt Stromberg
- Produced by: Hunt Stromberg
- Starring: Carrie Clark Ward; Bull Montana; Kalla Pasha
- Cinematography: Irving Reis
- Production company: Hunt Stromberg Productions
- Distributed by: Film Booking Offices of America
- Release date: September 30, 1923
- Country: United States
- Language: Silent (English intertitles)

Breaking Into Society is a 1923 American silent comedy film directed by Hunt Stromberg and starring Carrie Clark Ward, Bull Montana, and Kalla Pasha.

== Plot ==
As described in a film magazine review, the O'Toole's of Tin Can Alley inherit a great fortune. Determined to achieve a position in society, they settle Pasadena and entertain there in a lavish scale. However, their manners and disposition to rush matters get them into various scrapes. The final touch comes when a boxer and his bride from Chatham Square, an old pal of Tim O'Toole from the Alley days, without waiting for an invitation, pays the family a visit. A lurid time results, as stories of former fights are related and profusely illustrated, and all table rules are ruthlessly smashed. Finally, the horrified guests make a hasty getaway.

== Cast ==
- Carrie Clark Ward as Mrs. Pat O'Toole
- Bull Montana as Tim O'Toole
- Kalla Pasha as Pat O'Toole
- Francis Trebaol as Marty O'Toole
- Florence Gilbert as Yvonne
- Leo White as A Barber
- Tiny Sandford as A Chiropractor
- Stanhope Wheatcroft as Wealthy Man
- Charles Reisner as Pittsburgh Kid
- Gertrude Short as Sally

== Preservation ==
With no prints of Breaking Into Society located in any film archives, it is considered a lost film.

== Bibliography ==
- Munden, Kenneth White. The American Film Institute Catalog of Motion Pictures Produced in the United States, Part 1. University of California Press, 1997.
