= Harry Langdon =

American actor and comedian (1884–1944)

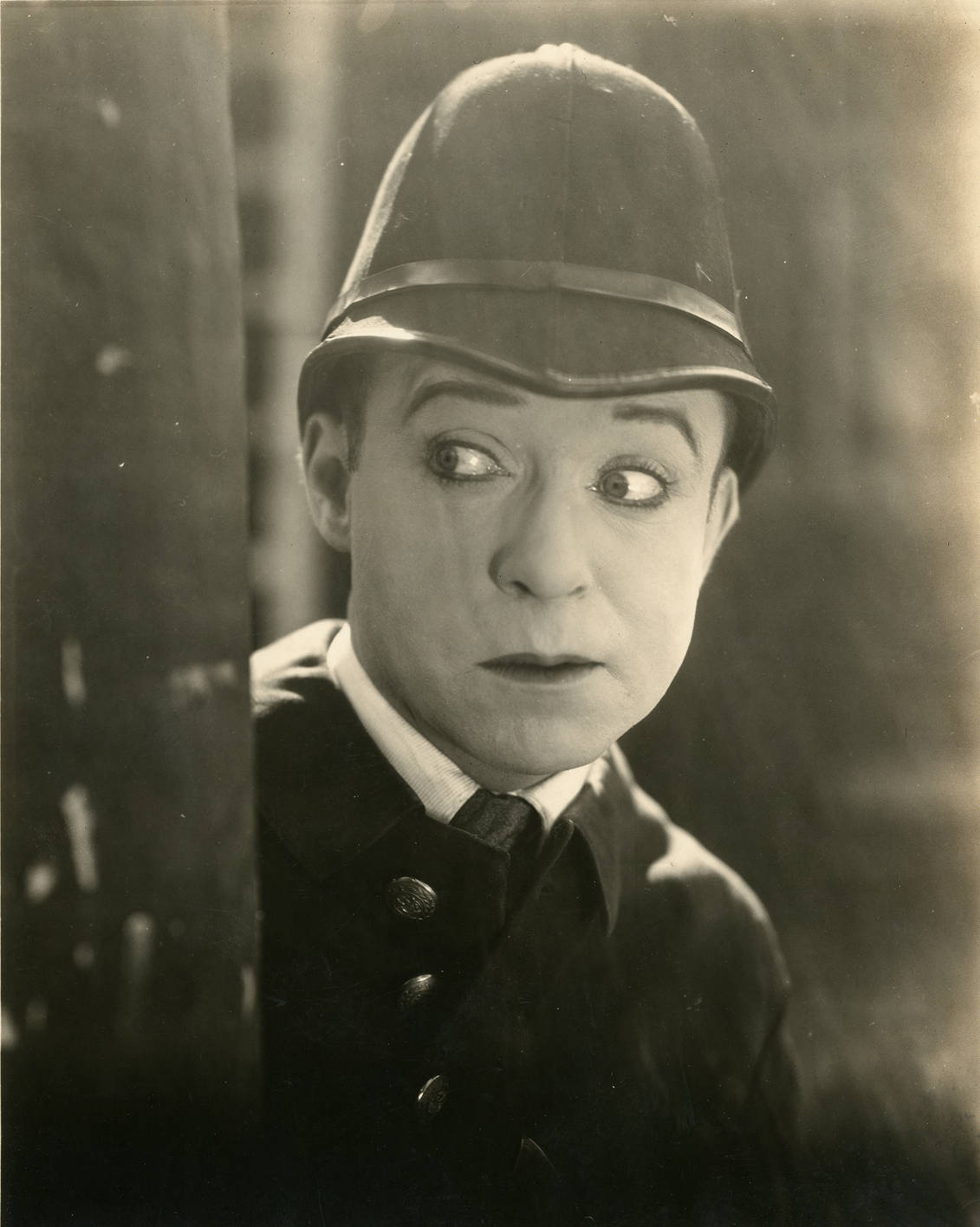
- Langdon in 1924
- Born: Henry Philmore Langdon; June 15, 1884; Council Bluffs, Iowa, U.S.
- Died: December 22, 1944 (aged 60); Los Angeles, California
- Resting place: Grand View Memorial Park Cemetery, Glendale, California, U.S.
- Occupations: Actor, comedian
- Years active: 1903–1944
- Spouses: Rose Francis Musolff (m. 1903; div. 1928) Helen Walton (m. 1929; div. 1932) Mabel Sheldon (m. 1934)
- Children: Harry Jr.

Henry Philmore "Harry" Langdon (June 15, 1884 – December 22, 1944) was an American actor and comedian who appeared in vaudeville, silent films (where he had his greatest fame), and talkies.

== Life and career ==
Langdon on “The Serious Side of Comedy Making” (from Theatre magazine, December 1927):

- ”I am convinced that comedy is much harder to achieve than drama.”
- ”There are few more tragic businesses in the world than the making of funny pictures.”
- "Comedy is the satire of tragedy. [...] deliciously comic moments, on the outside, are full of sad significance for those who realize the sinister characterization of the situation.”
- “Have you ever analyzed why you laugh at things? It is the concentration on the physical, as opposed to the spiritual.”
- “The four greatest stimuli to laughter are rigidity, automatism, absentmindedness and unsociability.”
- “The enjoyment of comedy, just like the enjoyment of tragedy, is the result of the feeling of remoteness from the situation characterictured.”

Born in Council Bluffs, Iowa, Langdon began working in medicine shows and stock companies while in his teens. In 1906, he entered vaudeville with his first wife, Rose Langdon. By 1915, he had developed a sketch named "Johnny's New Car", on which he performed variations in the years that followed. In 1923, he joined Principal Pictures Corporation, a company headed by producer Sol Lesser. He eventually went to The Mack Sennett Studios, where he became a major star. At the height of his film career, he was considered one of the four best comics of the silent film era. His screen character was that of a wide-eyed, childlike man with an innocent's understanding of the world and the people in it. He was a first-class pantomimist.

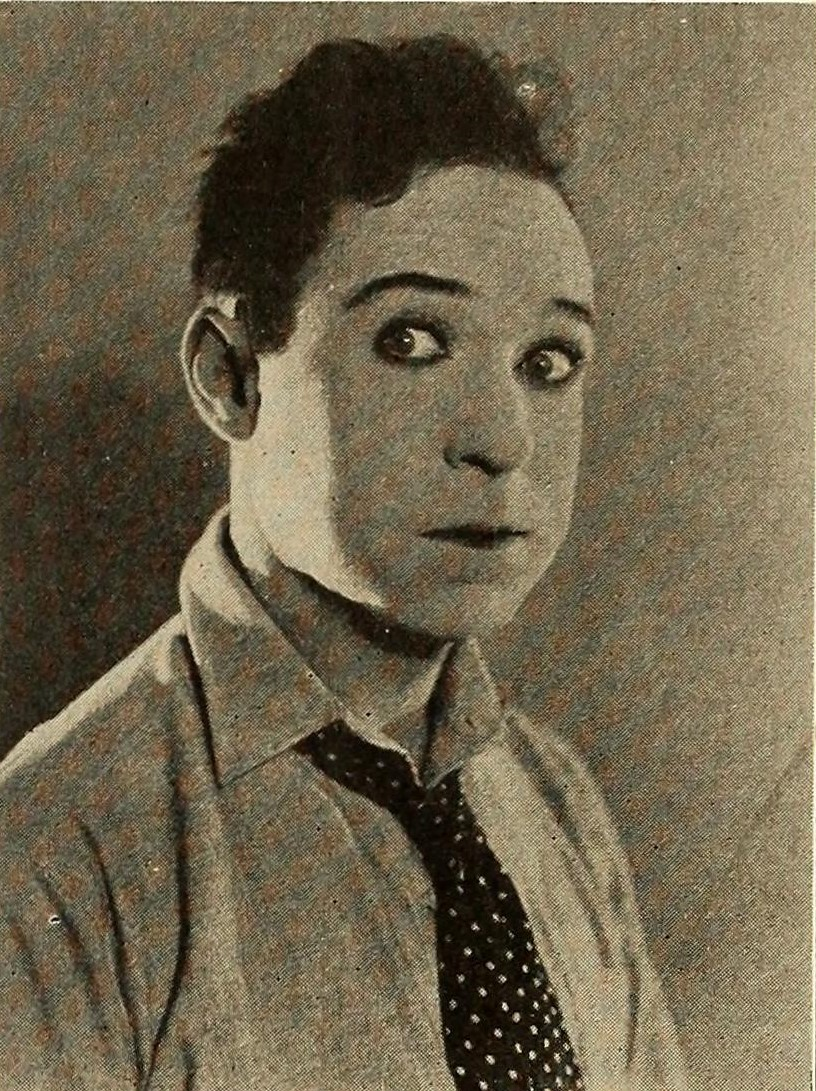
Langdon in 1925

Most of Langdon's 1920s work was produced at the famous Mack Sennett studio. His screen character was unique and his antics so different from the broad Sennett slapstick that he soon had a following. Success led him into feature films, directed by Arthur Ripley and Frank Capra. With such directors guiding him, Langdon's work rivaled that of Charlie Chaplin, Buster Keaton, and Harold Lloyd. Many consider his best films to be The Strong Man (1926), Tramp, Tramp, Tramp (1926), and Long Pants (1927). Langdon acted as producer on these features, which were made for his own company, The Harry Langdon Corporation, and released by First National Pictures.

After his initial success, Langdon fired Capra and directed his own films, including Three's a Crowd, The Chaser, and Heart Trouble, but his appeal faded. These films were more personal and idiosyncratic, and audiences of the period were not interested. Capra later claimed that Langdon's decline stemmed from the fact that, unlike the other great silent comics, he never fully understood what made his own film character successful. However, Langdon's biographer Bill Schelly, among others, expressed skepticism about this claim, arguing that Langdon had established his character in vaudeville long before he entered movies, added by the fact that he wrote most of his own material during his stage years. History shows that Langdon's greatest success was while being directed by Capra, and once he took hold of his own destiny, his original film comedy persona dropped sharply in popularity with audiences. This is likely not due to Langdon's material, which he had always written himself, but due to his inexperience with the many fine points of directing, at which Capra excelled, but at which Langdon was a novice. On the other hand, a look at Langdon's filmography shows that Capra directed only two of Langdon's 30 silent comedies. His last silent film, and the last one Langdon directed, Heart Trouble, is a "lost film", so it is difficult to assess whether he might have begun achieving a greater understanding of the directorial process with more experience. The coming of sound, and the drastic changes in cinema it engendered, also thwarted Langdon's chances of evolving as a director and perhaps defining a style that might have enjoyed greater box office success.

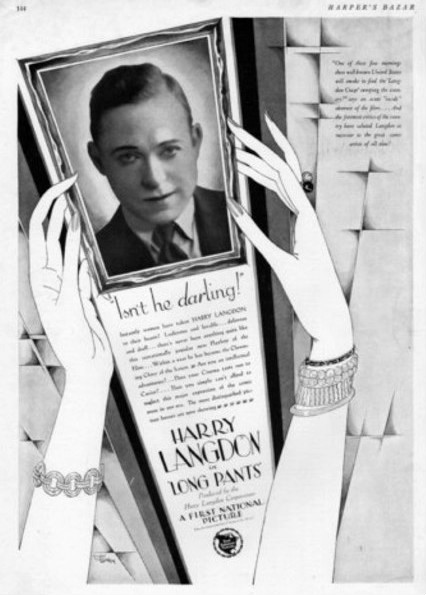
1927 Harper's Bazaar ad for Long Pants

== Transition to sound films ==
Langdon's babyish character did not adapt well to sound films; as producer Hal Roach remarked, "He was not so funny articulate." Roach starred Langdon in eight sound shorts in 1929–1930, which were not popular enough to keep the series going. Langdon did land occasional one-shot roles in feature films, including See America Thirst (Universal, 1930), opposite Slim Summerville, and Hallelujah, I'm a Bum (United Artists, 1933), opposite Al Jolson.

Langdon was still a big enough name to command leads in short subjects. He reunited with his Sennett co-star Vernon Dent for a series of two-reelers with Educational Pictures in 1932-34. Columbia Pictures, initiating its own short-comedy unit, hired Langdon away from Educational in 1934. In 1938, beginning with the Columbia short A Doggone Mixup, Langdon adopted a Caspar Milquetoast-type, henpecked-husband character that served him well. He alternated this new character with his established "helpless innocent" character.

Langdon was considered to be the live-action role model for Dopey in Snow White and the Seven Dwarfs, but Walt Disney rejected the idea. Eddie Collins played the role instead.

In 1938 Langdon returned to the Hal Roach studio for a surprise guest appearance in the screwball comedy feature There Goes My Heart. While at Roach he contributed to comedy scripts as a writer, notably for Laurel and Hardy. When Stan Laurel's contract with Roach expired, Oliver Hardy's contract was still in force, leading Roach to cast Langdon opposite Hardy in the 1939 antebellum comedy Zenobia.

== Comeback ==
In 1940 Harry Langdon made a comeback as a starring comedian in feature-length films. Misbehaving Husbands (1940) was a domestic comedy with Langdon using his henpecked-husband character. It was also a comeback film for the director, William Beaudine, an important silent-film director whose fortunes had declined by the late 1930s. Although Misbehaving Husbands was produced and released by PRC, the tiniest of the Hollywood studios, Langdon and Beaudine received critical raves for their work: "Preview house rewarded them with practically solid laughter" (Boxoffice); "Easily [Langdon's] best performance in years" (Motion Picture Daily). In the trade, the picture was noteworthy enough to re-establish both Langdon and Beaudine, albeit in low-budget features. They soon worked steadily at Monogram Pictures.

Misbehaving Husbands turned out to be Langdon's last starring feature; he shared two subsequent leads with co-star Charley Rogers. Langdon continued to play mild-mannered goofs in features (almost exclusively for Monogram) and slapstick short subjects for Columbia. Toward the end of the Columbia series, producer Jules White tried making Langdon part of a team, and paired him with Elsie Ames, Monty Collins, Una Merkel, and finally El Brendel.

== Death and recognition ==
Langdon suffered a cerebral hemorrhage during the filming of the Republic musical Swingin' on a Rainbow, and died on December 22, 1944. All funeral arrangements were handled by Langdon's old friend Vernon Dent. Langdon was cremated and his ashes interred at Grand View Memorial Park Cemetery in Glendale, California.

At the height of his career, Langdon was making $7,500 per week, a fortune for the times. In his obituary the New York Times wrote that "his whole appeal was a consummate ability to look inexpressibly forlorn when confronted with manifold misfortunes—usually of the domestic type. He was what was known as 'dead-pan'...the feeble smile and owlish blink which had become his stock-in-trade caught on in a big way, and he skyrocketed to fame and fortune..."

On February 8, 1960, (the same day as Andy Clyde), Langdon received a star on the Hollywood Walk of Fame at 6927 Hollywood Boulevard, for his contribution to the motion pictures industry.

In 1997, his home town of Council Bluffs celebrated "Harry Langdon Day" and in 1999 named Harry Langdon Boulevard in his honor. For his contribution to the motion picture industry, Harry Langdon has a star on the Hollywood Walk of Fame at 6925 Hollywood Boulevard.

Langdon is briefly depicted in the biographical film Stan & Ollie, played by Richard Cant, where he is preparing for the shooting of Zenobia with Oliver Hardy.

Langdon's son, Harry Langdon Jr., went on to a successful career as a Hollywood photographer.

== Critical appraisal ==
Film historian Richard Koszarski offers this assessment of Langdon's career:

That Harry Langdon’s once high-flying career came to so abrupt an end should have surprised no one. First, his comic style was so idiosyncratic that it seems a wonder he ever achieved widespread recognition at all. Infantilism as the root of a comic character has inborn limitations, and sound would inevitably have dealt it a death blow. But more important, when success was achieved Langdon dismissed his collaborators and foolishly attempted to run both the creative and financial sides of his operation himself. A failure at both ends, he personally ground his career to a disastrous halt, but not before producing some of the most personal and perplexing works of the American cinema.

== Partial filmography ==
† – denotes entry part of the Columbia Pictures short subject series

- The Sky Scraper aka The Greenhorn (1923)
- A Tough Tenderfoot aka Horace Greeley, Jr. (1923)
- A Perfect Nuisance aka The White Wing's Bride (1923)
- Picking Peaches (1924, Short) as Harry - A Shoe Clerk
- Smile Please (1924, Short) as Otto Focus - the Hero
- Scarem Much (1924, Short) as Ringside Spectator (uncredited)
- Shanghaied Lovers (1924, Short) as A Shanghaied Sailor
- Flickering Youth (1924, Short) as Gus Guitar
- The Cat's Meow (1924, Short) as Eddie Elgin
- His New Mamma (1924, Short) as The Farmer Boy
- The First Hundred Years (1924, Short) as A Newly-Wed
- The Luck o' the Foolish (1924, Short) as Mr. Newlywed
- The Hansom Cabman (1924, Short) as Harry Doolittle
- All Night Long (1924, Short) as Harry Hall - the Boy
- Feet of Mud (1924, Short) as The Boy - Harry Holdem
- The Sea Squawk (1925, Short) as Sandy McNickel - an Immigrant
- His Marriage Wow (1925, Short) as The Groom - Harold Hope
- Boobs in the Wood (1925, Short) as The Boy - Chester Winfield
- Plain Clothes (1925, Short) as Harvey Carter
- Remember When? (1925, Short) as Harry Hudson
- Lucky Stars (1925, Short) as Harry Lamb
- There He Goes (1925, Short) as Harry
- Saturday Afternoon (1926, Short) as Harry Higgins
- Tramp, Tramp, Tramp (1926) as Harry Logan
- Soldier Man (1926, Short) as The Soldier / King Strudel the 13th of Bomania
- Ella Cinders (1926) as Harry Langdon (uncredited)
- The Strong Man (1926) as Paul Bergot
- Long Pants (1927) as Harry Shelby
- His First Flame (1927) as Harry Howells
- Three's a Crowd (1927) as Harry - the Odd Fellow
- Fiddlesticks (1927, Short) as Harry Hogan
- The Chaser (1928) as The Husband
- Heart Trouble (1928, director) as Harry Van Housen
- Hotter Than Hot (1929, Short)
- Sky Boy (1929, Short)
- Skirt Shy (1929, Short) as Dobbs, the butler
- The Head Guy (1930, Short) as Harry, Temporary Station Master
- The Fighting Parson (1930, Short) as The Banjo Player
- The Big Kick (1930, Short) as Harry
- The Shrimp (1930, Short) as Harry
- The King (1930, Short) as The King
- A Soldier's Plaything (1930) as Tim
- See America Thirst (1930) as Wally
- The Big Flash (1932, Short) as Harry
- Tired Feet (1933, Short)
- Hallelujah, I'm a Bum (1933) as Egghead
- The Hitchhiker (1933, Short) as The Hitchhiker
- Knight Duty (1933, Short) as Harry
- Tied for Life (1933, Short) as The Groom
- Marriage Humor (1933, Short)
- Hooks and Jabs (1933, Short)
- The Stage Hand (1933, Short) as Harry
- My Weakness (1933) as Dan Cupid
- On Ice (1933, Short)
- Roaming Romeo (1933, Short)
- Circus Hoodoo (1934, Short)
- Petting Preferred (1934, Short)
- Counsel on De Fence (1934, †, Short) as Darrow Langdon
- Shivers (1934, †, Short) as Ichabod Somerset Crop
- His Bridal Sweet (1935, †, Short) as Himself
- Love, Honor, and Obey (the Law!) (1935, Short) as Harry
- The Leather Necker (1935, †, Short)
- Atlantic Adventure (1935) as Snapper McGillicuddy
- His Marriage Mix-Up (1935, †, Short)
- I Don't Remember (1935, †, Short) as Harry Crump
- Wise Guys (1937, director)
- Block-Heads (1938, writer)
- A Doggone Mixup (1938, †, Short) as Himself
- Stardust (1938) as Otto Schultz
- Sue My Lawyer (1938, †, Short) as Himself
- There Goes My Heart (1938) as Minister (uncredited)
- Zenobia (1939) as Professor McCrackle
- The Flying Deuces (1939, writer)
- A Chump at Oxford (1940, writer)
- Saps at Sea (1940, writer)
- Goodness! A Ghost (1940, Short)
- Cold Turkey (1940, †, Short) as Himself
- Misbehaving Husbands (1940) as Henry Butler
- Sitting Pretty (1940)
- Road Show (1941, writer)
- All-American Co-Ed (1941) as Hap Holden
- Double Trouble (1941) as Albert 'Bert' Prattle
- What Makes Lizzy Dizzy? (1942, †, Short) as Harry
- House of Errors (1942) as Bert
- Tireman, Spare My Tires (1942, †, Short) as Himself
- Carry Harry (1942, †, Short) as Harry
- Piano Mooner (1942, †, Short) as Harry
- A Blitz on the Fritz (1943, †, Short) as Egbert Slipp
- Blonde and Groom (1943, †, Short) as Harry
- Here Comes Mr. Zerk (1943, †, Short) as Egbert Slipp
- Spotlight Scandals (1943) as Oscar Martin
- To Heir is Human (1944, †, Short) as Harry Fenner
- Defective Detectives (1944, †, Short) as Harry
- Hot Rhythm (1944) as Mr. Whiffle
- Mopey Dope (1944, †, Short)
- Block Busters (1944) as Higgins
- Snooper Service (1945, †, Short)
- Pistol Packin' Nitwits (1945, †, Short) as Harry
- Swingin' on a Rainbow (1945) as Chester Willouby (final film role)

== See also ==
- List of United States comedy films
