= Ruth Hiatt =

American actress (1906–1994)

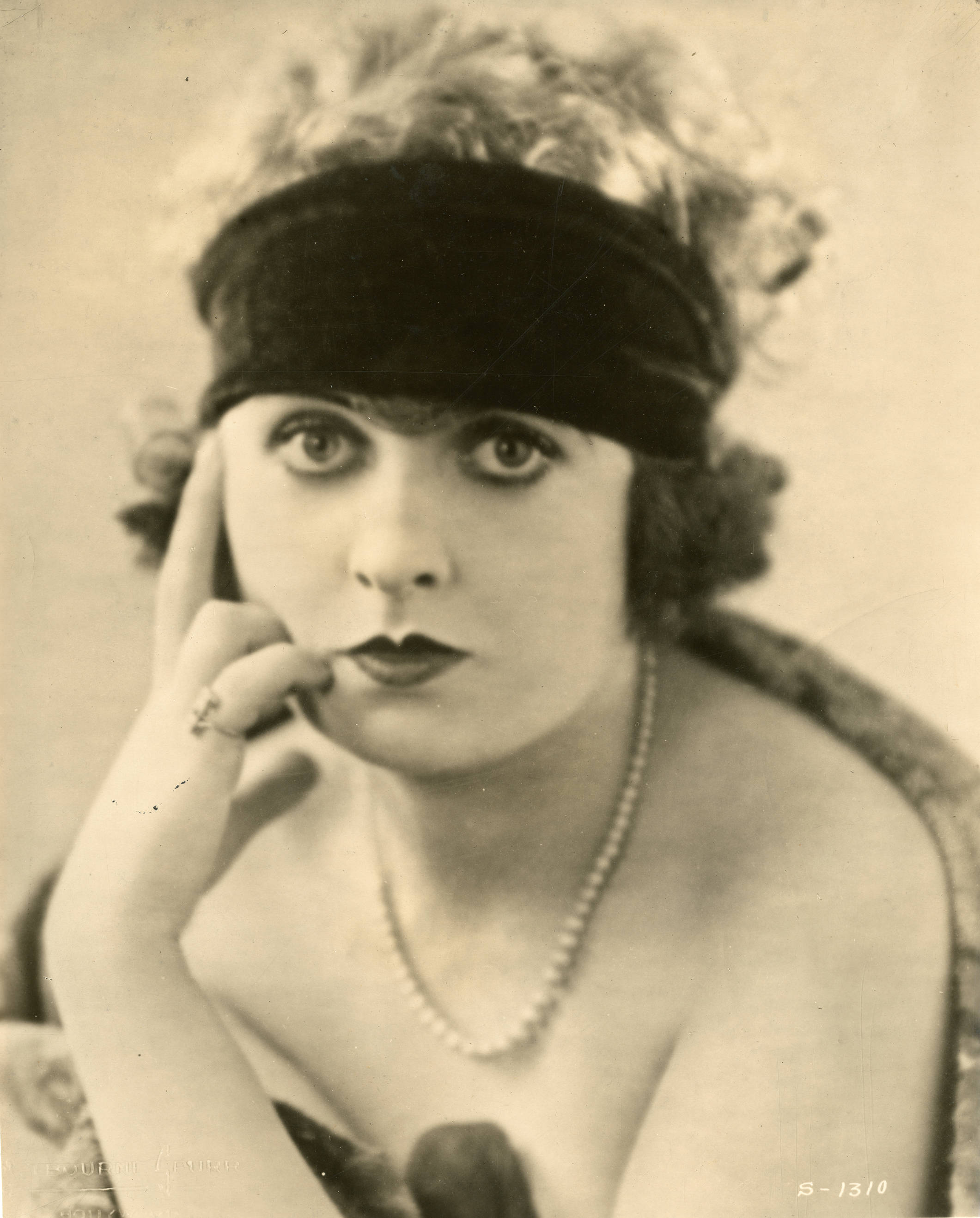
- Hiatt in 1924
- Born: Ruth Redfern; January 6, 1906; Cripple Creek, Colorado, U.S.
- Died: April 21, 1994 (aged 88); Montrose, California, U.S.
- Occupation: Actress
- Years active: 1915–1941
- Spouse: Harry Lieberman (m. 1938)

Ruth Hiatt (born Ruth Redfern; January 6, 1906 – April 21, 1994) was an American actress in motion pictures beginning in the silent film era. She is best known for performing in 1920s comedies directed by Jack White, Norman Taurog, and Mack Sennett.

== Child actress ==
Hiatt was born in Cripple Creek, Colorado. After moving with her family to San Diego, she made her film debut at the age of nine with the Western Lubin Company in San Diego, California. She made two two-reel comedies The Inner Chamber (1915) and The Vigilantes (1918). Afterward she returned to high school which she completed around 1922.

== Film comedian ==
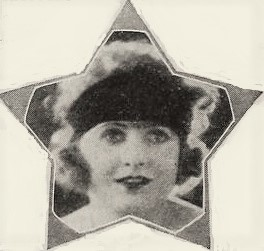
Ruth Hiatt 1924

As teenager she was discovered by comedian Lloyd Hamilton. She became his leading lady at United Artists studios in 1922. Hiatt was a former classic dancer who was Hamilton's successor to Irene Dalton. Their first work together is the short comedy The Speeder (1922). In 1923, Hiatt was contracted for the leading female role in the remaining Educational-Hamilton films.

Hiatt played a street urchin in support of Hamilton in Lonesome (1924). In the role she wears high top shoes which were once worn by United States Senator Harry Lane of Oregon. Lane discarded them at the home of his cousin, cartoonist Pinto Colvig.

In Smith's Baby (1925) Hiatt is the female lead (Mrs Smith) with Raymond McKee. Sennett cast Hiatt and McKee with Our Gang child star Mary Ann Jackson in 1927. The short comedies continued the Jimmy Smith series with titles like Smith's Pony (1927), Smith's Cook (1927), Smith's Cousin (1927), and Smith's Modiste Shop (1927). The movies were produced by Pathe Pictures. Jackson and McKee teamed with Hiatt and Hoot Gibson in The Flying Cowboy (1928). She was in the 1928 comedy The Burglar.

Hiatt appeared in the second chapter of the Ken Maynard Sunset Trail (1932) serial entitled Battling With Buffalo Bill. Maynard's horse, Tarzan, was in this story of the open range before the army and law enforcement established themselves in western cattle towns.

Hiatt's film career endured through 1941. Some of her later appearances were in the Three Stooges comedy Men In Black, the Our Gang entry Beginner's Luck, and Double Trouble (1941).

== Modeling career ==
In August 1922, Hiatt modeled for Beckman Furs of West 7th Street in Los Angeles, California. She won first prize for beauty at the annual Venice Beach bathing beauties parade in August 1923. She wore a costume of black and white checkered silk, with hat and slippers that matched.

== Recognition ==
The Western Association of Motion Picture Advertisers (WAMPAS) selected Hiatt among its thirteen baby star actresses for 1924. Blanche Mehaffey, Carmelita Geraghty, and Clara Bow were also chosen. Hiatt was blonde but one reporter covering the WAMPAS banquet in San Francisco, in December 1923, wrote that she was brunette.

== Death ==
Hiatt died of congestive heart failure on April 21, 1994, in Montrose, California.

== Private life ==
In April 1938, Hiatt married Harry Liberman, an oil man from San Francisco, in Tijuana, Mexico. Hiatt had a toy poodle known professionally as Georgette. She maintained a diet of lamb chops and pineapple together with strenuous daily exercise. Hiatt's personality was vivacious, yet modest, almost to the point of being shy.
