= Kalla Pasha =

American actor

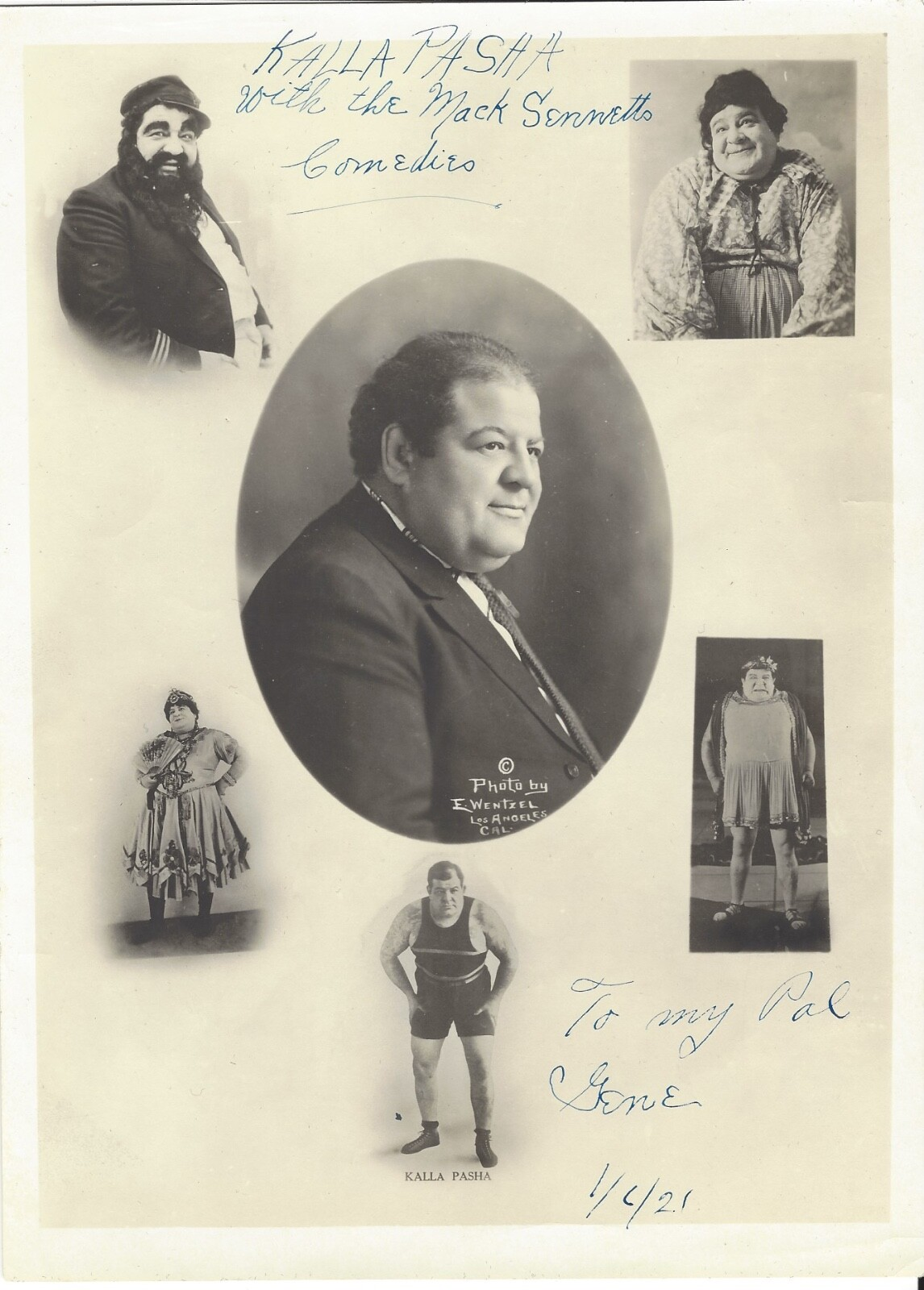
- Inscribed Photo to Co-Star
- Born: Joseph T. Rickard; March 5, 1879; Detroit, Michigan, US
- Died: June 10, 1933 (aged 54); Talmage, California, US
- Occupations: Wrestler, vaudevillian, screen actor
- Years active: 1919–1931

Kalla Pasha (born as Joseph T. Rickard; March 5, 1879 – June 10, 1933) was an American professional wrestler, vaudeville comedian, and film actor active during the silent era.

== Biography ==
Kalla Pasha was the stage name of Joseph T. Rickard, a native of Detroit. He was the professional wrestler Hamid Kalla Pasha, whom the press called "The Crazy Turk" before performing on vaudeville and appearing in 74 films between 1919 and 1931. Rickard's success with Mack Sennett enabled him to be a free-spender, claiming later he would often go about town with a 150 thousand dollars strapped around his waist.

The money did not last though, and not long afterward he was arrested for striking a man over the head with a milk bottle during a dust-up involving five cents. As a result, Rickard was sent to Mendocino State Hospital for psychiatric care, where he would die a little over a year later from heart disease.

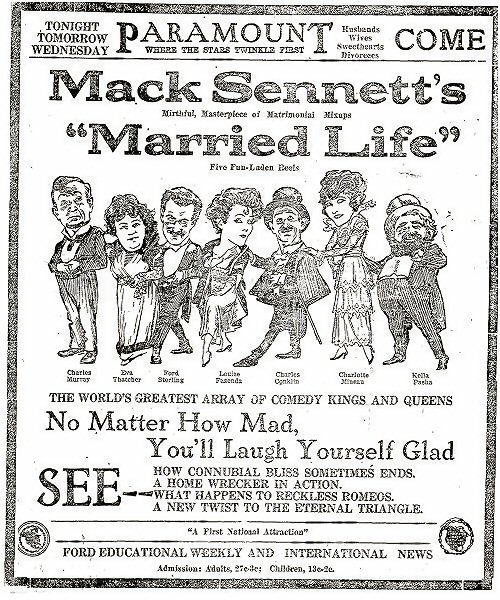
Caricature of Pasha (far right) in promotion of Married Life (1920)

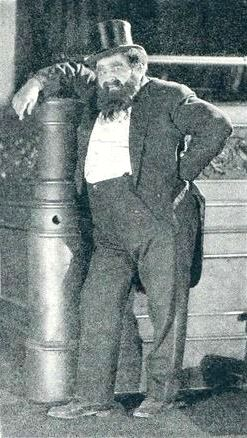
Pasha in Film Fun (1922))

== Selected filmography ==
- The Wicked Darling (1919)
- Love, Honor and Behave (1920)
- Down on the Farm (1920)
- Married Life (1920)
- A Small Town Idol (1921)
- The Dictator (1922)
- Ruggles of Red Gap (1923)
- Thirty Days (1922)
- Breaking Into Society (1923)
- A Million to Burn (1923)
- The Cat's Meow (1924)
- His Supreme Moment (1925)
- Heads Up (1925)
- Silken Shackles (1926)
- Don Juan's Three Nights (1926)
- When a Man Loves (1927)
- The Devil Dancer (1927)
- The Dove (1927)
- Tillie's Punctured Romance (1928)
- West of Zanzibar (1928)
- Seven Footprints to Satan (1929)
- The Show of Shows (1929)
- I Surrender Dear (1931)
- One More Chance (1931)
