= Harry Edwards (director) =

Canadian-American film director and actor (1887–1952)

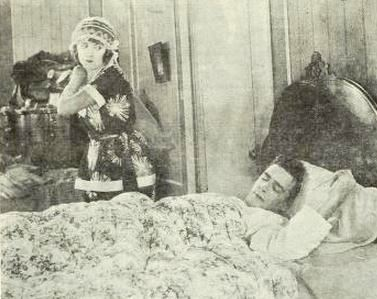
- Edwards with Mary Wynn in the comedy short Rest in Peace (1921)
- Born: October 11, 1887; Calgary, Alberta, Canada
- Died: May 26, 1952 (aged 64)
- Years active: 1910–1952
- Spouse: Gladys Brockwell (m. 1918–1919)
- Relatives: Billie Brockwell (mother-in-law)

Harry Edwards (October 11, 1887 – May 26, 1952) was a Canadian-born American film director and actor. He worked in films from the 1910s to the 1950s.

== Biography ==
He was born in Calgary on 11 October 1887.

He once worked for the now largely forgotten L-KO Kompany during the silent era. In his later years at Columbia Pictures, Edwards established a reputation as the studio's worst director. Both Vera Vague and the Three Stooges requested they not work with him.

He is best remembered for his long collaboration with comedian Harry Langdon. He worked with Langdon in the 1920s in some of his best short films, and directed one of Langdon's best known films, the feature Tramp, Tramp, Tramp (1926). Langdon later became swell-headed with success and later dispensed with Edwards and Frank Capra, who also directed some of Langdon's most successful films, deciding he could direct himself. Langdon's decision proved to be a costly one as his career declined, though he later reconciled with Edwards and worked with him again in various short comedies in the 1930s and 1940s until Langdon's death in 1944. Of the hundreds of films he directed, just two were feature-length: Tramp, Tramp, Tramp (1926) and His First Flame (1927)

Shortly after directing his first television production, Edwards died in Los Angeles of carbon tetrachloride poisoning on May 26, 1952.

From 1918 to 1919, he was married to the actress Gladys Brockwell, daughter of actress Billie Brockwell.
