= Butterfingers =

Butterfingers may refer to:

- Butterfinger, an American confectionery brand of Ferrero
- Butterfinger (Canadian band), a Canadian alternative-rock band
- Butterfingers (Australian band), an Australian hip hop group
- Butterfingers (Malaysian band), a Malaysian rock band
- Butter Fingers, a 1925 American film directed by Del Lord
- "Butterfingers", a 2009 song by Amy Pearson
- "Butterfingers" (Doctors), a 2004 television episode
