= Leo Sulky =

American actor (1874–1957)

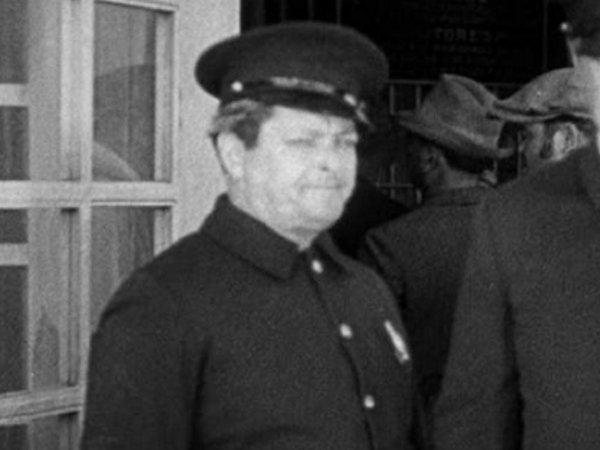
- Leo Sulky as the prison guard in The Hoose-Gow (1929)
- Born: June 12, 1874; Cincinnati, Ohio, US
- Died: June 3, 1957 (aged 82); Los Angeles, California, US
- Occupation: Actor

Leo Sulky (6 December 1874 – 3 June 1957) was an American actor. He usually appeared in films directed by Del Lord such as Black Oxfords (1924), Yukon Jake (1924), Wall Street Blues (1924), Lizzies of the Field (1924), Galloping Bungalows (1924), From Rags to Britches (1925), and A Sea Dog's Tale (1926); by Harry Edwards such as The Lion and the Souse (1924), The Luck o' the Foolish (1924). The Hansom Cabman (1924), All Night Long (1924), There He Goes (1925), The Sea Squawk (1925), Boobs in the Wood (1925), and Plain Clothes (1925); and by Ralph Ceder such as Little Robinson Corkscrew (1924), and Wandering Waistlines (1924).

He also appeared in The First 100 Years (1924) by Harry Sweet, The Window Dummy (1925) by Lloyd Bacon, Hotsy Totsy (1925) by Alf Goulding, Alice Be Good (1926) by Eddie Cline, Picking Peaches (1924) by Erle C. Kenton, Romeo and Juliet (1924), She Couldn't Say No (1954), Reap the Wild Wind (1942), The Rainmakers (1935), The Jolly Jilter (1927) starring Lois Boyd and Bud Ross, The Wild Goose Chaser (1925) and A Raspberry Romance (1925).

== Selected filmography ==
- The Village Smithy (1919, Short) as Minor Role (uncredited)
- Ten Dollars or Ten Days (1920, Short)
- A Wooden Legacy (1920, Short)
- Her Lucky Day (1920, Short)
- Cinderella Cinders (1920, Short)
- Lunatics in Politics (1920, Short)
- The Tomboy (1921) as The Ex-Bartender
- Big Town Ideas (1921) as George Small
- Ten Dollars or Ten Days (1924, Short) as The Police Captain
- Picking Peaches (1924, Short) as Fashion Show Judge (uncredited)
- One Spooky Night (1924, Short) as Hobo (uncredited)
- Scarem Much (1924, Short) as Ringside Spectator (uncredited)
- Flickering Youth (1924, Short) as Minor Role (uncredited)
- Black Oxfords (1924, Short) as Prison Sheriff Umpire
- Yukon Jake (1924, Short) as Jake's Henchman (uncredited)
- The Lion and the Souse (1924, Short) as Charley Elk - Actor
- Romeo and Juliet (1924, Short) as Drinking Theatregoer (uncredited)
- Wall Street Blues (1924, Short) as Money Loaner / Police Captain
- The First 100 Years (1924, Short) as Hypnotist (uncredited)
- Lizzies of the Field (1924, Short) as Race Official (uncredited)
- The Luck o' the Foolish (1924, Short) as Train Passenger
- Little Robinson Corkscrew (1924, Short) as Villager
- Wandering Waistlines (1924, Short) as Minor Role (uncredited)
- The Hansom Cabman (1924, Short) as A Butler
- Galloping Bungalows (1924, Short) as Fireman (uncredited)
- All Night Long (1924, Short) as Bank Robber (uncredited)
- The Cannon Ball Express (1924, Short) as Engineer
- Feet of Mud (1924, Short) as Chinatown Huckster (uncredited)
- Off His Trolley (1924, Short) as Trolley Conductor (uncredited)
- Bull and Sand (1924, Short) as Officer in Box (uncredited)
- The Sea Squawk (1925, Short) as Detective
- The Wild Goose Chaser (1925, Short) as Butler / Lover in Film
- Boobs in the Wood (1925, Short) as ToughMike / Poker Dealer
- Water Wagons (1925, Short) as Dangerfield's Henchman
- The Raspberry Romance (1925, Short) as Leo Mallet - Seymour's Partner
- Plain Clothes (1925, Short) as The Pawnbroker
- Breaking the Ice (1925, Short) as The Hotel Detective
- Super-Hooper-Dyne Lizzies (1925, Short) as 1st Prospective Buyer
- Sneezing Beezers (1925, Short) as The New King
- The Iron Nag (1925, Short) as Waldo Watkins
- Butter Fingers (1925, Short) as Umpire / Baseball Player (uncredited)
- A Rainy Knight (1925, Short) as Brock's Business Associate
- Good Morning, Madam! (1925, Short) as The Restaurant Owner
- A Sweet Pickle (1925, Short) as Guest
- Take Your Time (1925, Short) as The Burglar
- There He Goes (1925, Short) as The Butler
- The Window Dummy (1925, Short) as The Store Manager
- From Rags to Britches (1925, Short) as Attorney John Lawler
- Hotsy-Totsy (1925) as Store Detective (uncredited)
- Wide Open Faces (1926, Short) as Townsman in Barroom
- Muscle-Bound Music (1926, Short) as The Ring Announcer
- A Yankee Doodle Duke (1926, Short) as Servant (uncredited)
- Ice Cold Cocos (1926, Short) as Mr. Thaw
- A Sea Dog's Tale (1926, Short) as Native (uncredited)
- Alice Be Good (1926, Short) as Minor Role
- Smith's Vacation (1926, Short) as Baggage Car Man / 1st Tour Guide
- Hoboken to Hollywood (1926, Short) as Company President
- Strictly Kosher (1926, Short) as Pat O'Conner
- Smith's Landlord (1926, Short) as Large Mover
- Love's Last Laugh (1926, Short) as Ship's Officer (uncredited)
- Smith's Visitor (1926, Short) as Jimmy's Pal
- Masked Mamas (1926, Short) as The Practical Joker
- A Harem Knight (1926, Short) as Man with Whisk Broom (uncredited)
- Kitty from Killarney (1926, Short) as Theatre Manager
- Should Sleepwalkers Marry? (1927, Short) as Churchgoer (uncredited)
- The Plumber's Daughter (1927, Short) as Servant
- The Jolly Jilter (1927, Short) as Groomer (uncredited)
- A Small Town Princess (1927, Short) as Waiter (uncredited)
- Smith's Kindergarten (1927, Short) as The Grocer
- Love 'Em and Weep (1927, Short) as Restaurant Manager (uncredited)
- Ham and Herring (1927, Short) as Pat O'Connor
- Fiddlesticks (1927, Short) as Pawnbroker (uncredited)
- Have a Heart (1928, Short) as Mad Scientist's Assistant (uncredited)
- Habeas Corpus (1928, Short) as Detective On Telephone (uncredited)
- Going Ga-Ga (1929, Short) as Minor Role (uncredited)
- Movie Night (1929, Short) as Movie Patron (uncredited)
- The Hoose-Gow (1929, Short) as Prison Guard (uncredited)
- Numbered Men (1930) as Convict (uncredited)
- Sweethearts on Parade (1930)
- Beau Hunks (1932, Short) as Legionnaire / Arab Soldier (uncredited)
- Tiger Shark (1932) as Drinking Crewman (uncredited)
- A Wrestler's Bride (1933, Short) as Man Behind Desk (uncredited)
- Thundering Taxis (1933, Short) as Blocker Cabbie (uncredited)
- The Power and the Glory (1933) as 2nd Strike Leader on Platform (uncredited)
- Duck Soup (1933) as Agitator (uncredited)
- Blood Money (1933) as Detective (uncredited)
- The Son of Kong (1933) as Minor Role (uncredited)
- Les Misérables (1935) as Galley Whip Warder (uncredited)
- Party Wire (1935) as Townsman at Meeting (uncredited)
- The Rainmakers (1935) as Fireman (uncredited)
- A Night at the Opera (1935) as Policeman (uncredited)
- The Calling of Dan Matthews (1935) as Bartender (uncredited)
- Sons o' Guns (1936) as Soldier (uncredited)
- Our Relations (1936) as Courtroom Spectator (uncredited)
- We Who Are About to Die (1937) as Convict (uncredited)
- Marked Woman (1937) as Bartender (uncredited)
- San Quentin (1937) as Convict (uncredited)
- Destry Rides Again (1939) as Bartender (uncredited)
- Reap the Wild Wind (1942) as Juror (uncredited)
- Larceny, Inc. (1942) as Passerby (uncredited)
- Action in the North Atlantic (1943) as Unemployed Seaman (uncredited)
- The Good Fellows (1943) as Townsman (uncredited)
- The Saxon Charm (1948) as Cafe Waiter (uncredited)
- Not Wanted (1949) as Townsman (uncredited)
- Reign of Terror (1949) as Citizen (uncredited)
- Always Leave Them Laughing (1949) as New Haven Electrician (uncredited)
- Kill the Umpire (1950) as Minor Role (uncredited)
- Harvey (1950) as Minor Role (uncredited)
- Belle Le Grand (1951) as Miner at Lynching (uncredited)
- Meet Danny Wilson (1952) as Minor Role (uncredited)
- Stars and Stripes Forever (1952) as Spectator (uncredited)
- She Couldn't Say No (1953) as Minor Role (uncredited) (final film role)

== Bibliography ==
- Walker, Bren E. (25 April 2013). Mack Sennett's Fun Factory: A History and Filmography of His Studio and His Keystone and Mack Sennett Comedies, with Biographies of Players and Personnel. McFarland Publishing. p. 671. ISBN 9780786477111.
- Neibaur, James L. (6 July 2012). The Silent Films of Harry Langdon (1923-1928). Scarecrow Press. p. 224. ISBN 9780810885318.
