= Charles Hammond =

Charles Hammond may refer to:

- Charlie Hammond (1886–1936), Australian footballer
- C. Herrick Hammond (1882–1969), American architect
- Charles Hammond (English cricketer) (1818–1901), English cricketer
- Charles Hammond (Australian cricketer) (1868–1955), Australian cricketer
- Charles Hammond (lawyer and journalist) (1779–1840), American lawyer, journalist and politician
