= The Big Diamond Robbery =

1929 film

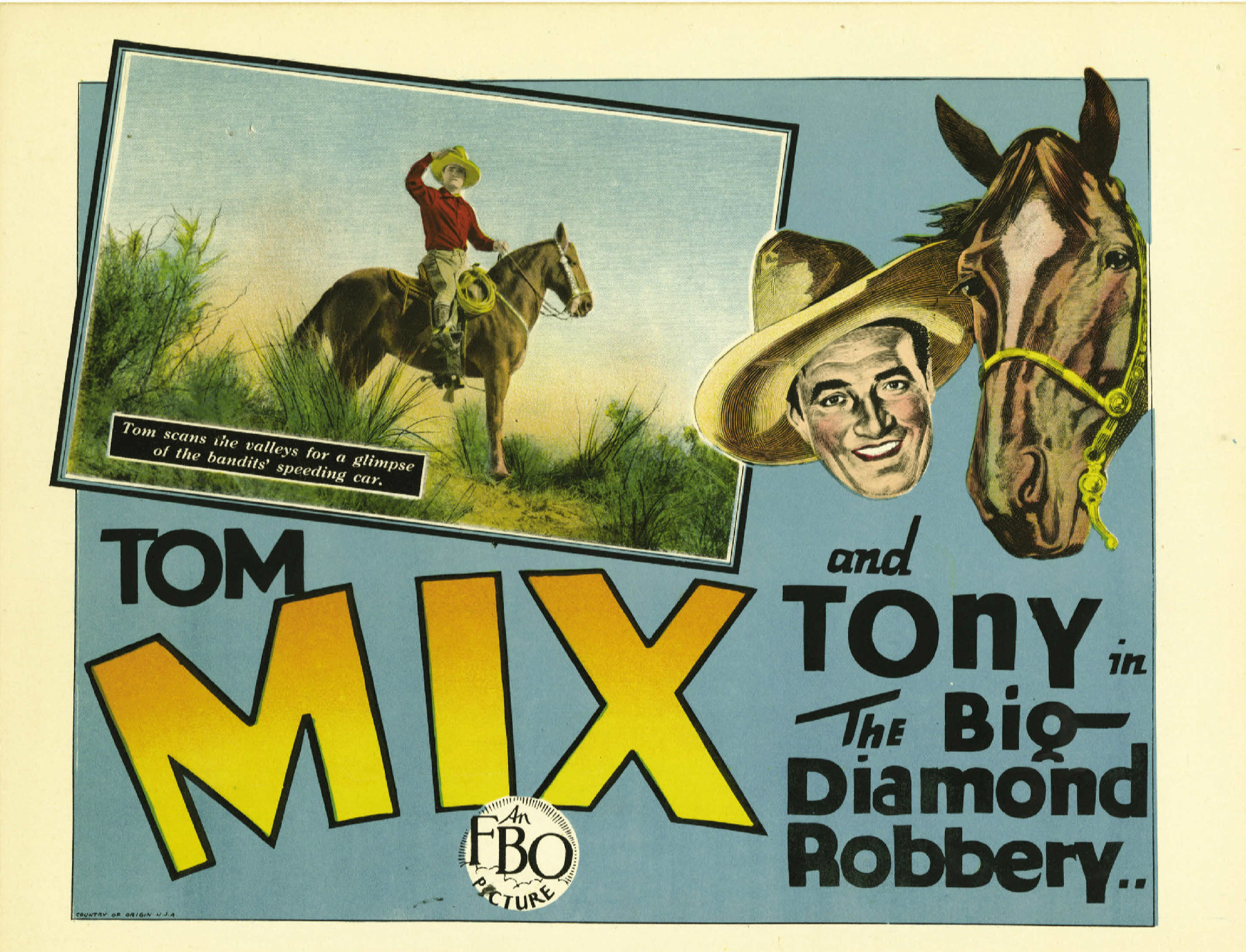
- Directed by: Eugene Forde
- Written by: Randolph Bartlett; Frank Howard Clark; Eugene Forde; John Twist
- Starring: Tom Mix; Kathryn McGuire; Frank Beal
- Cinematography: Norman Devol
- Edited by: Henry Weber
- Production company: FBO
- Distributed by: FBO
- Release date: May 13, 1929
- Running time: 65 minutes
- Country: United States
- Languages: Silent; English intertitles

The Big Diamond Robbery is a 1929 American silent crime comedy film directed by Eugene Forde. The film stars Tom Mix in the lead role, with Kathryn McGuire and Frank Beal in supporting roles. It follows the story of a daring cowboy (Mix) who sets out to recover a stolen diamond, encountering a host of comedic and thrilling adventures along the way. Unlike many of Mix's westerns, this film is set in contemporary 1920s Arizona.

The Big Diamond Robbery was the last of five films Mix made for FBO Studios and also marked his final silent film. Released on April 20, 1929, it received positive reviews from critics, with praise for Mix's performance and the film's fast-paced action sequences. The film performed relatively well at the box-office for a silent film, attracting large audiences despite the growing popularity of talkies.

== Plot ==
Tom, a daring cowboy, is hired to track down a priceless diamond stolen from a wealthy collector by a gang of ruthless criminals. Set against the backdrop of 1920s Arizona, the film opens with the theft of a valuable diamond, a gemstone of immense worth, from a wealthy collector. The diamond is stolen by a ruthless gang of criminals, who plan to sell it on the black market for a fortune.

Tom is hired to track down the thieves and recover the stolen gem. Armed with his knowledge of the rugged terrain and his ability to outmaneuver foes, Tom sets off on a mission filled with danger and intrigue. His investigation leads him into the criminal underworld, where he faces numerous challenges, including high-speed chases on horseback, gunfights, and perilous escapes.

Throughout the film, Tom's quick thinking and physical prowess are on full display as he navigates through treacherous situations, often using humor and wit to outsmart his adversaries. Along the way, he crosses paths with various colorful characters, including a cunning femme fatale and a corrupt businessman who has ties to the stolen diamond.

As Tom inches closer to uncovering the truth, the stakes rise, and the tension builds. In a climactic final showdown, Tom confronts the leader of the gang in a dramatic battle of wits and brawn. With clever tricks and daring stunts, he manages to recover the diamond and bring the criminals to justice. The film concludes with Tom returning the gem to its rightful owner, celebrated as a hero who once again proves that no one can outsmart the brave cowboy.

The Big Diamond Robbery (1929)

== Cast ==
- Tom Mix as Tom Markham
- Kathryn McGuire as Ellen Brooks
- Frank Beal as George Brooks
- Martha Mattox as Aunt Effie
- Ernest Hilliard as Rodney Stevens
- Barney Furey as Barney McGill
- Ethan Laidlaw as Chick

== Bibliography ==
- Jensen, Richard D. The Amazing Tom Mix: The Most Famous Cowboy of the Movies. 2005.
