= Hook and Ladder (1924 film) =

1924 film directed by Edward Sedgwick

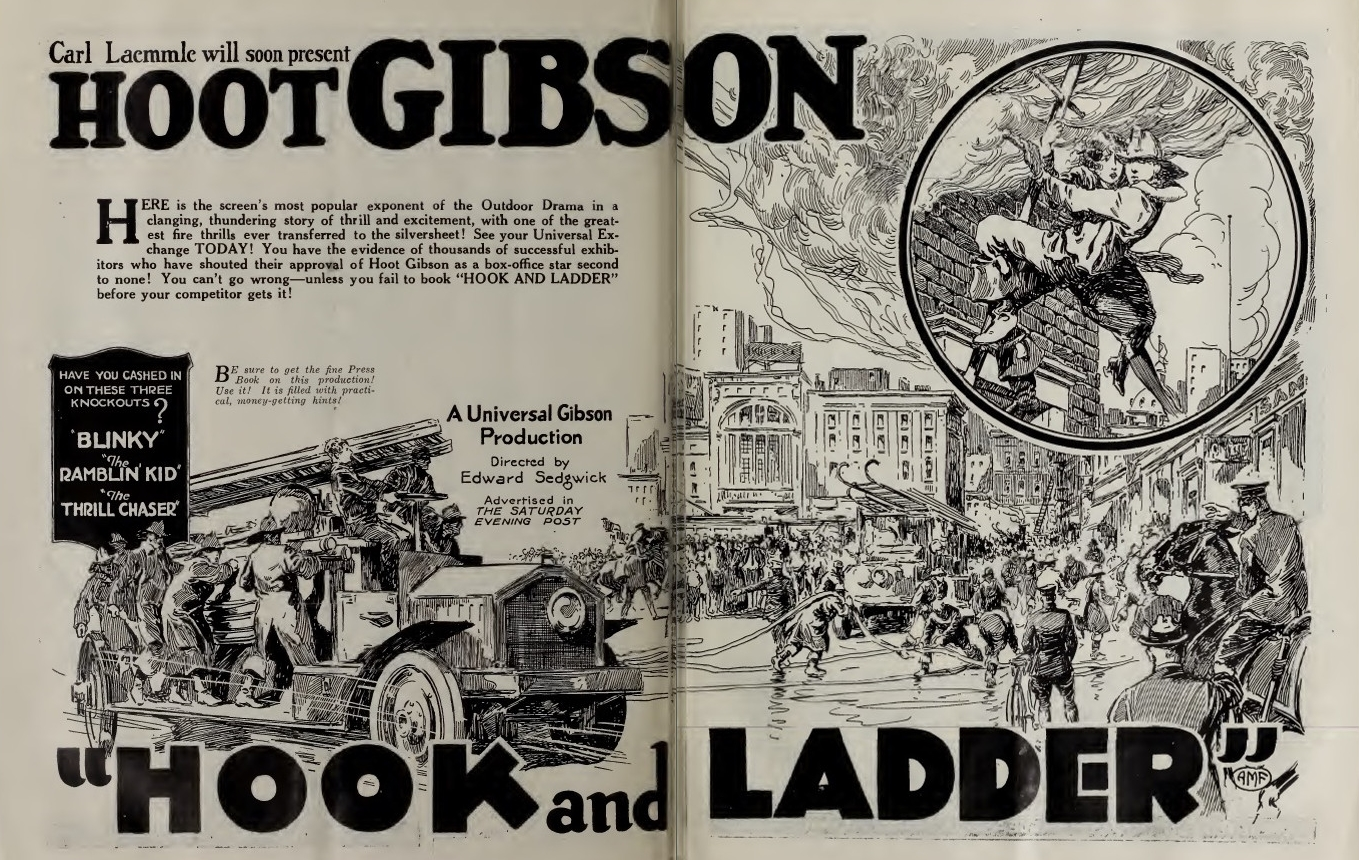
- Advertisement for film
- Directed by: Edward Sedgwick
- Written by: Richard Schayer; Raymond L. Schrock; Edward Sedgwick
- Starring: Hoot Gibson
- Cinematography: Virgil Miller
- Production company: Universal Pictures Corporation
- Distributed by: Universal Pictures Corporation
- Release date: January 7, 1924
- Running time: 60 minutes
- Country: United States
- Languages: Silent; English intertitles

Hook and Ladder is a 1924 American silent Western film directed by Edward Sedgwick and featuring Hoot Gibson.

== Plot ==
Ace Cooper, a cowboy who has just arrived in the city, inadvertently gets mixed up in a little misunderstanding between several cowboys and a stockyards cashier in regard to their pay. Ace leaves the premises suddenly with a policeman loping along behind them. Ace crashes the fire lines and in the excitement of a residence fire disguises himself with a fireman's helmet and slicker. The cop loses him in the shuffle and Ace is forced into service by a truck captain who, in the smoke, mistakes him for a fireman. Later the cowboy is recognized at the station and an explanation is necessary. The stockyards affair is settled and Ace is offered a job by the department and decides to join when he sees the captain's good looking daughter. He falls in love with the daughter, but meets with tough opposition in the person of Gus Henshaw, a young ward healer and protégé of Big Tim O'Rourke, the city's political boss. Affairs reach a crisis when Henshaw, curbed by O'Rourke, arranges a plan to get even with O'Rourke and settle the affair between the cowboy and Sally Drennan, the fireman's daughter. He lures Sally to the O'Rourke home with a false letter and locks them in a room together and then telephones Ace at the fire station. In a fight with O'Rourke's butler, an ash tray is spilled and a fire is started. The big climax of the story is reached in the burning of the O'Rourke mansion—one of the most spectacular fire scenes ever filmed and the cowboy proves that the training which brought him such sore muscles and the other firemen so many laughs was far from wasted.

== Cast ==
- Hoot Gibson as Ace Cooper
- Mildred June as Sally Drennan
- Frank Beal as Captain "Smoky Joe" Drennan
- Edwards Davis as "Big Tom" O'Rourke
- Philo McCullough as Gus Henshaw
