= Young Donovan's Kid =

1931 film

- Theatrical poster
- Directed by: Fred Niblo; James Anderson (assistant)
- Written by: J. Walter Ruben
- Based on: the novel, Big Brother by Rex Beach
- Produced by: William LeBaron; Louis Sarecky (associate)
- Starring: Richard Dix; Jackie Cooper; Marion Shilling
- Cinematography: Edward Cronjager
- Production company: RKO Radio Pictures
- Distributed by: RKO Radio Pictures
- Release dates: May 21, 1931 (Premiere-New York City); June 6, 1931 (U.S.)
- Running time: 77 minutes
- Country: United States
- Language: English
- Budget: $279,000
- Box office: $618,000

Young Donovan's Kid is a 1931 American pre-Code melodrama film directed by Fred Niblo, from a screenplay by J. Walter Ruben, based upon the short story, Big Brother, by Rex Beach. It was a remake of a 1923 silent film of the same, produced by Famous Players–Lasky, and directed by Allan Dwan. This version starred Richard Dix, Jackie Cooper (who was on loan to RKO from Hal Roach Studios), and Marion Shilling. The film also featured Boris Karloff in a supporting role as "Cokey Joe".

== Plot ==
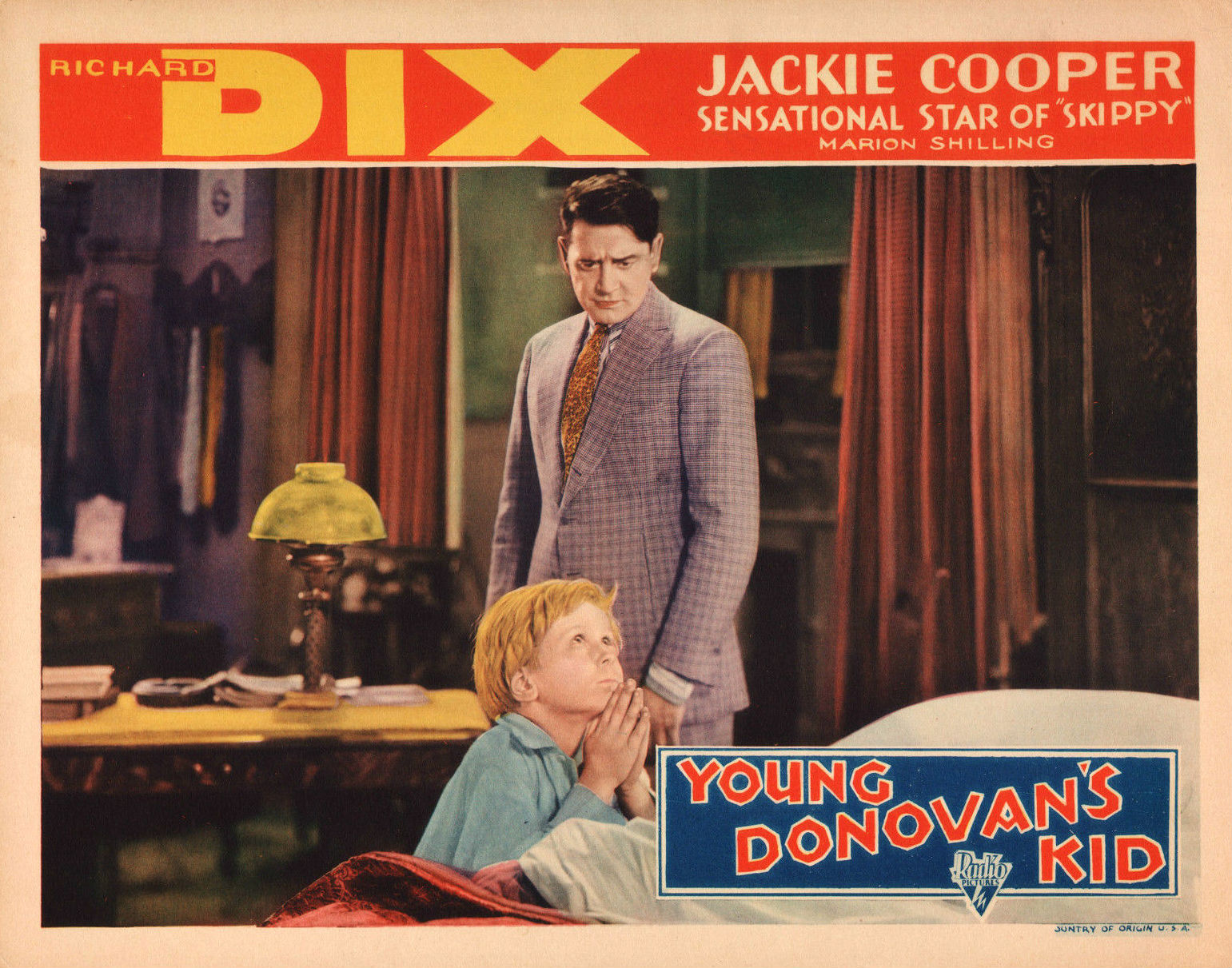
Lobby card for Young Donovan's Kid

Jim Donovan is a two-bit mob leader in New York during the 1920s. When another mobster, Ben Murray is killed in a gunfight between rival gangs, Donovan takes it upon himself to raise his son, Midge Murray. When Donovan seeks the advice of the parish priest on how to raise an adolescent boy, the priest, Father Dan, enlists the services of his niece, Kitty Costello. When she directs Donovan to get honest work, he agrees, and she gets him a job at the ironworks where she is also employed. He is slowly transformed by the effect that both Midge and Kitty have on him. He also falls in love with Kitty.

Things are going well until the government gets involved, and Midge is taken away from Donovan and sent to a house of correction. Donovan is devastated and loses his mind, declaring war on the authorities. However, Kitty has not given up on him, and gets him to calm down, by working out a deal with the authorities (due to her own personal standing in the community) where Midge will be returned to him if he keeps his nose clean for several months.

The romance between Kitty and Donovan further blossoms over the course of the next couple of months, as Donovan looks forward to the return of Midge. However, one day as he is visiting Midge, Kitty is robbed of $5,000 which she was transporting from the ironworks to the bank. The police, suspecting the worst, arrest Donovan. He escapes from police custody and tracks down the actual culprits who perpetrated the robbery, who happen to be his old gang. He recovers the money, but in the process is seriously wounded in a gunfight.

Donovan manages to return the stolen funds to the police before collapsing. While in the hospital, he and Kitty declare their love for one another, and he is promised that Midge will join them shortly.

== Cast ==
- Richard Dix as Jim Donovan
- Marion Shilling as Kitty Costello
- Jackie Cooper as Midge Murray
- Frank Sheridan as Father Dan
- Boris Karloff as Cokey Joe
- Dick Rush as Burke
- Fred Kelsey as Collins
- Richard Alexander as Ben Murray
- Harry Tenbrook as Spike Doyle
- Wilfred Lucas as Duryea
- Philip Sleeman as Mike Novarro (as Phil Sleeman)
- Robert Wilber as Monk Manilla
- Charles Sullivan as Gyp
- Jack Perry as Lefty
- Frank Beal as McConnell

(Cast list as per AFI database)

== Reception ==
The film recorded a loss of $100,000.

Mordaunt Hall of The New York Times did not enjoy the film, stating it was "a trifle too wearying for anybody more than sixteen. Other reviews of the time were a bit more generous. Screenland stated it was "A potent underworld drama with Richard Dix and Jackie Cooper giving great performances. The National Board of Review Magazine said the film was "Not so well directed as the silent version made years ago under the title of Big Brother, but the extraordinary acting of Jackie Cooper as the boy makes it well worth seeing." The Motion Picture Herald also gave it a favorable review.

The film also received good notices from the New York World-Telegram, the New York American, the Daily News, Film Daily, the Evening Graphic, the Motion Picture Daily, the Evening Journal, and the New York Herald Tribune.

International Photographer also had praise for the film especially for Dix and Cooper, of the latter saying, "... in his first screen appearance following Skippy. In the present instance the youngster's opportunities if anything are greater than in the former."

== Notes ==
This film is a remake of the Famous Players–Lasky 1923 film Big Brother, directed by Allan Dwan, and starring Tom Moore, Edith Roberts and Mickey Bennett.

The film was originally going to be title Born to the Racket, but was changed to Young Donovan's Kid in April 1931.

== See also ==
- Boris Karloff filmography
