= Frank Beal =

American actor

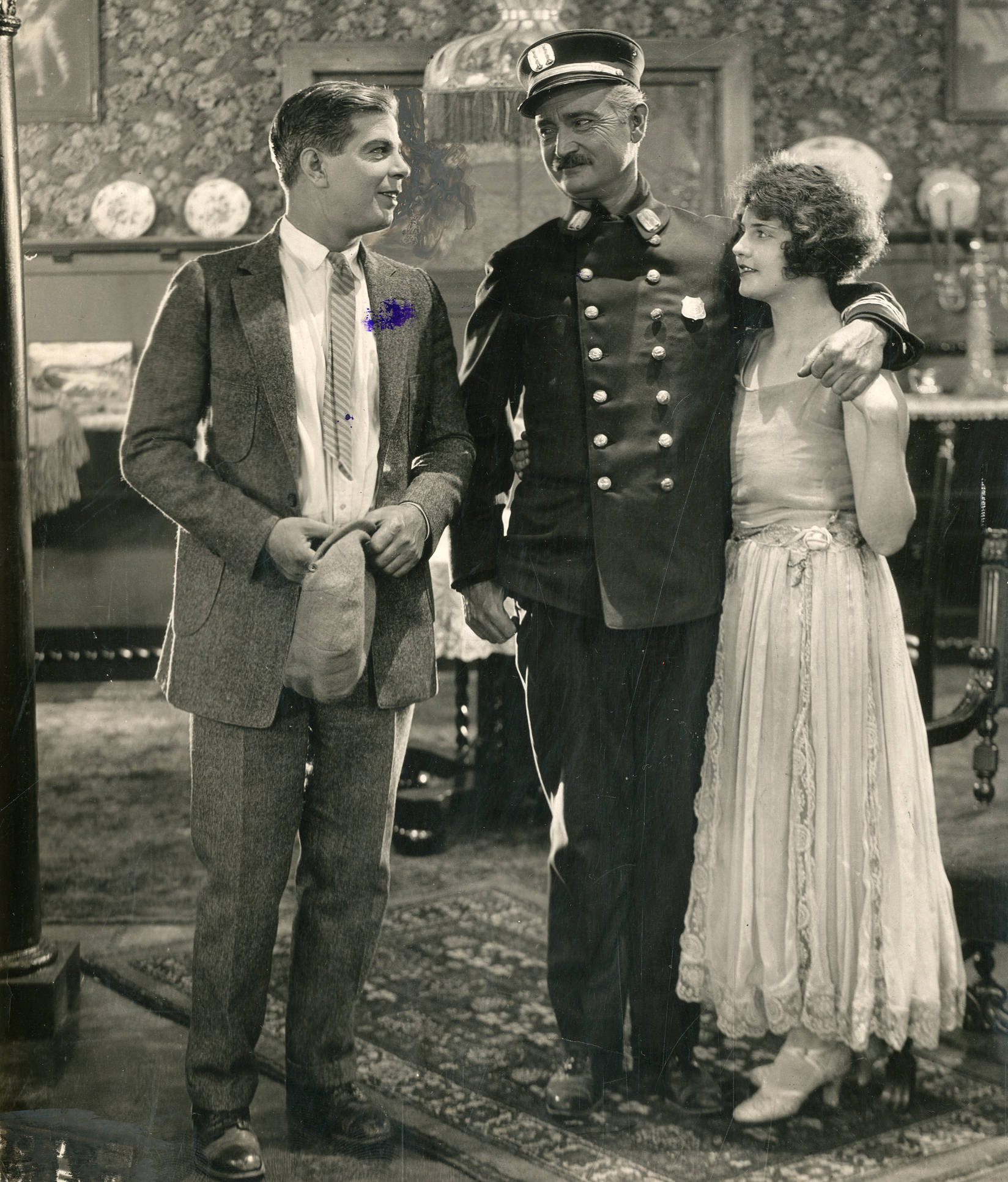
- Hoot Gibson, Frank Beal, and Mildred June in Hook and Ladder (1924)
- Born: September 11, 1862; Cleveland, Ohio, U.S.
- Died: December 20, 1934 (aged 72); Hollywood, California, U.S.
- Resting place: Hollywood Forever Cemetery
- Occupations: Actor, film director
- Years active: 1910-1933
- Spouse: Louise Lester
- Children: Scott Beal; Dolly Beal; Katherine Beal

Frank Beal (September 11, 1862 – December 20, 1934) was an American actor and film director of the silent film era.

== Biography ==
Born in Cleveland, Ohio, in 1862, Beal began acting in 1880 and gained fame as a director and an actor. In 1908, he moved from stage to film, with the Selig Polyscope Company. He appeared in 42 films between 1910 and 1933, and also directed 41 films between 1910 and 1921.

Beal was married to actress Louise Lester and was the father of actress Dolly Beal and actor Scott Beal. He died in Hollywood, California, in 1934. His obituary in the Los Angeles Times called him "one of the first prominent figures of the theatrical industry to desert it and go into motion pictures".

== Partial filmography ==
- Mismated (1916)
- The Curse of Eve (1917)
- Her Moment (1918)
- The Danger Zone (1918)
- Thieves (1919)
- A Question of Honor (1922)
- Playing It Wild (1923)
- Soft Boiled (1923)
- When Odds Are Even (1923)
- Hook and Ladder (1924)
- Arizona Express (1924)
- The Lone Chance (1924)
- The Cyclone Rider (1924)
- Marriage in Transit (1925)
- The Best Bad Man (1925)
- The Golden Strain (1925)
- The Mad Racer (1926)
- A Man Four-Square (1926)
- The Last Trail (1927)
- The Final Extra (1927)
- The Stolen Bride (1927)
- Galloping Fury (1927)
- The Danger Rider (1928)
- Broken Barriers (1928)
- Women Who Dare (1928)
- The Big Diamond Robbery (1929)
- Señor Americano (1929)
- Wide Open (1930)
- Young Donovan's Kid (1931)
- The Lost Special (1932)
- The Power and the Glory (1933) (uncredited)
