= Reina Valdez =

Silent film actress

- Born: December 1890; Springfield, Massachusetts, US
- Occupation: Actress

Reina Valdez (sometimes credited as Rena Valdez; born December 1890) was a silent film actress active in Hollywood in the 1910s.

Although some publicity reports claimed she was born and raised in Mexico, she was a native of Springfield, Massachusetts, where she grew up. Later, she moved to New York City to pursue an acting career. After a few appearances on Broadway, she eventually went to Los Angeles, where she worked for a number of film companies over the course of her short career, including the Santa Barbara Motion Picture Company, the New York Motion Picture Company, and Essanay. Little is known about her life before and after her film career. It is likely that "Reina Valdez" was her stage name.

== Selected filmography ==
- Mismated (1916)
- Good Out of Evil (1915)
- A Brother's Redemption (1915)
- The Woman He Married (1915)
- The Keeper of the Flock (1915)
- Beating Father to It (1915)
- The Call of the Sea (1915)
- The Boob's Racing Career (1915)
- Dan Cupid: Assayer (1914)
- The Atonement (1914)
- Single Handed (1914)
- The Conquest of Man (1914)
- The Arm of Vengeance (1914)
- Italian Love (1914)
- The Weaker's Strength (1914)
- A Gambler's Way (1914)
- A Night on the Road (1914)
- Through Trackless Sands (1914)
- The Trail of the Snake Band (1913)
- The Weaker Mind (1913)
