= Señor Americano =

1929 film

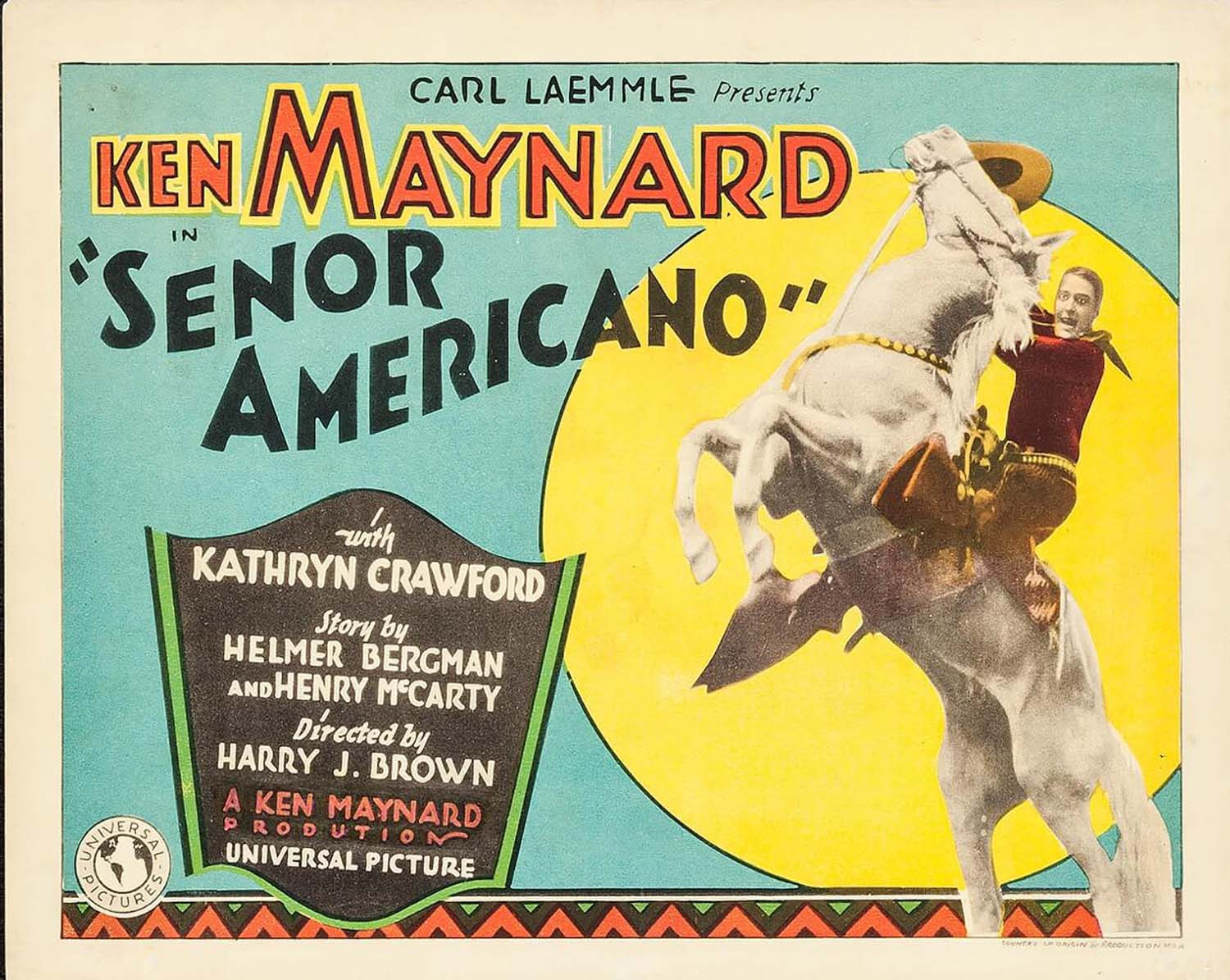
- Directed by: Harry Joe Brown
- Written by: Helmer Walton Bergman; Henry McCarty; Bennett Cohen; Leslie Mason
- Produced by: Carl Laemmle; Ken Maynard
- Starring: Ken Maynard; Kathryn Crawford; Frank Beal
- Cinematography: Ted D. McCord
- Edited by: Fred Allen
- Production company: Ken Maynard Productions
- Distributed by: Universal Pictures
- Release date: November 10, 1929
- Running time: 71 minutes
- Country: United States
- Languages: Sound film (Part-Talkie); English Intertitles

Señor Americano is a 1929 American sound part-talkie western film directed by Harry Joe Brown and starring Ken Maynard, Kathryn Crawford and Frank Beal. While the film has a few talking sequences, the majority of the film featured a synchronized musical score with sound effects. It was distributed by Universal Pictures. Produced during the transition to sound, it was released in both sound and silent versions.

== Synopsis ==
An American cavalry officer goes undercover in order to pursue a gang of bandits in California in the years before statehood.

== Cast ==
- Ken Maynard as Lieutenant Michael Banning
- Kathryn Crawford as Carmelita DeAccosta
- Frank Beal as Don Manuel DeAccosta
- Frank Yaconelli as Mañana
- J.P. McGowan as Maddox
- Gino Corrado as Carlos Ramirez

== See also ==
- List of early sound feature films (1926–1929)

== Bibliography ==
- Munden, Kenneth White. The American Film Institute Catalog of Motion Pictures Produced in the United States, Part 1. University of California Press, 1997.
