= Women Men Marry (1922 film) =

1922 film directed by Edward Dillon

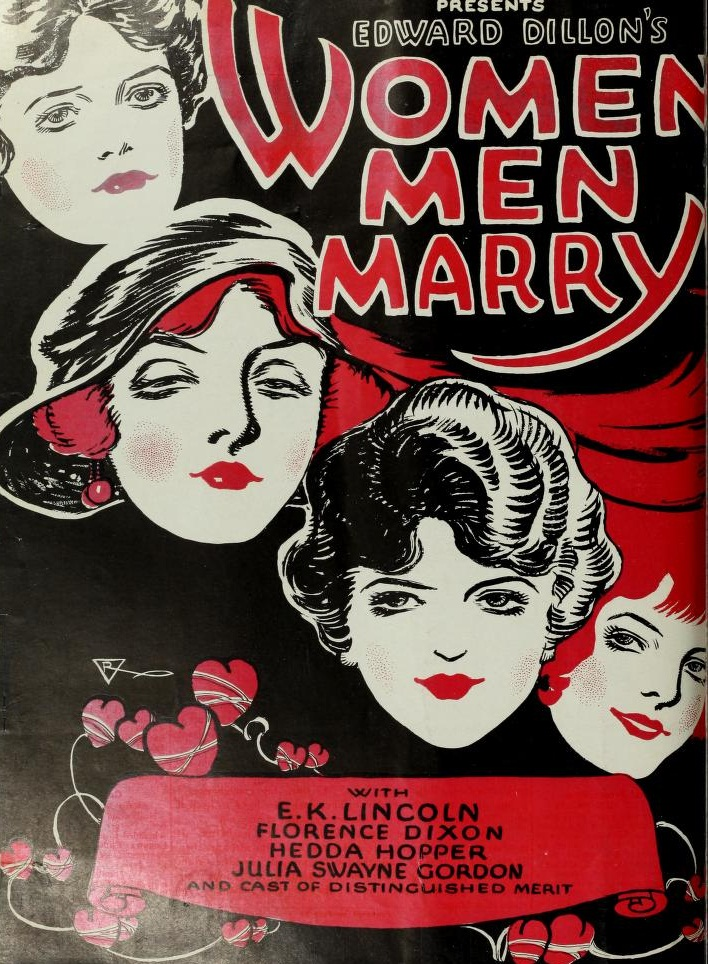
- Directed by: Edward Dillon
- Written by: Adelaide Heilbron, story & scenario
- Produced by: Edward Dillon
- Starring: E. K. Lincoln
- Cinematography: Roy Overbaugh
- Distributed by: Truart Film
- Release date: December 1922
- Running time: 6 reels
- Country: USA
- Language: Silent with English titles

Women Men Marry is a 1922 American silent film drama produced and directed by Edward Dillon.

== Cast ==
- E. K. Lincoln as Dick Clark
- Florence Dixon as Emerie Rogers
- Charles Hammond as Montgomery Rogers
- Hedda Hopper as Eleanor Carter
- Cyril Chadwick as Lord Brooks Fitzroy
- Margaret Seddon as Hetty Page
- Richard Carlyle as Adam Page
- Julia Swayne Gordon as Aunt Gertrude
- Maude Turner Gordon as Lady Mowbray
- James Harrison as Warren Mortimer

== Preservation status ==
A print survives at Filmmuseum Amsterdam.
