= Women Who Dare =

1928 film directed by Burton L. King

- Directed by: Burton L. King
- Written by: Adrian Johnson; Langdon McCormick
- Produced by: Samuel Zierler; Harry Chandlee
- Starring: Helene Chadwick; Charles Delaney; Frank Beal
- Cinematography: Arthur Reeves
- Production company: Excellent Pictures
- Distributed by: Excellent Pictures
- Release date: March 31, 1928
- Running time: 62 minutes
- Country: United States
- Languages: Silent; English intertitles

Women Who Dare is a 1928 American silent drama film directed by Burton L. King and starring Helene Chadwick, Charles Delaney and Frank Beal.

== Premise ==
A young woman from a wealthy family goes to work in a hospital in the slums, and campaigns for improved conditions for the poor.

== Cast ==
- Helene Chadwick as Stella Mowbray
- Charles Delaney as Ralph Miles
- Frank Beal as Edgar Mowbray
- Jack Richardson as Frank Lawson
- Henry A. Barrows as Dr. Alden
- James Quinn as Benny, the Spider
- James A. Fitzgerald as Spike Carson
- Grace Elliott as Satin Maggie
- Margaret McWade as Mrs. Kelly

== Bibliography ==
- Munden, Kenneth White. The American Film Institute Catalog of Motion Pictures Produced in the United States, Part 1. University of California Press, 1997.
