= The Broken Pledge =

1915 film

- Starring: Wallace Beery; Gloria Swanson
- Distributed by: Essanay Studios
- Release date: June 17, 1915
- Running time: 2 reels
- Country: United States
- Language: Silent with English intertitles

The Broken Pledge is a 1915 American silent comedy film starring Wallace Beery and Gloria Swanson. Off screen, Beery and Swanson were briefly married.

== Plot ==
Three girls, who have no interest in men, go camping together in the woods, unfortunately three boys pitch their tent not far off. The boys make unwanted advances, which are soundly rejected, and they return to their tents to plot. Three rats are released to scare them. They pretend to be angry natives to frighten the girls, and one of the girls fires of a gun in fear, which injures a boy. He returns to their camp to report of his wound, and says that he will need the tender care of one of the girls. The girls' sympathy gets the better of them, and they go to the boys' tent. The affection grows between the three pairs, and the film ends in a triple wedding.

== Cast ==
- Wallace Beery as Percy
- Virginia Bowker as Virginia
- Harry Dunkinson as Harold
- Gloria Swanson (billed as Gloria Mae Swanson)
