= Sinbad the Sailor (1947 film) =

1947 film by Richard Wallace

- Theatrical release poster
- Directed by: Richard Wallace
- Screenplay by: John Twist
- Story by: John Twist; George Worthing Yates
- Produced by: Stephen Ames
- Starring: Douglas Fairbanks Jr. Maureen O'Hara; Walter Slezak; Anthony Quinn; George Tobias; Mike Mazurki
- Cinematography: George Barnes
- Edited by: Frank Doyle
- Music by: Roy Webb
- Production company: RKO Radio Pictures
- Distributed by: RKO Radio Pictures (USA)
- Release date: January 13, 1947 (USA)
- Running time: 116-118 minutes
- Country: United States
- Language: English
- Budget: $2,459,000
- Box office: $2.8 million (US rentals)

Sinbad the Sailor is a 1947 American Technicolor fantasy film directed by Richard Wallace and starring Douglas Fairbanks Jr., Maureen O'Hara, Walter Slezak, Anthony Quinn and Mike Mazurki. It tells the tale of the eighth voyage of Sinbad in which he discovers the lost treasure of Alexander the Great.

== Plot ==
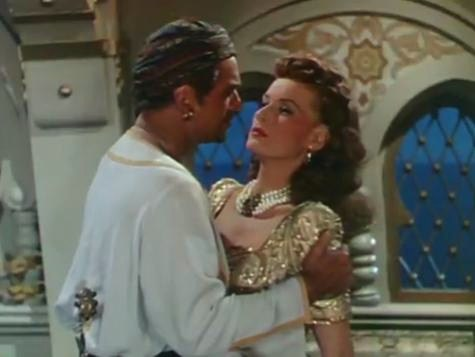
Fairbanks and O'Hara in the film's trailer

Sinbad regales a group of travelers around a nighttime campfire. When his listeners become bored with his tired tales, Sinbad recounts his eighth voyage.

With his friend Abbu, Sinbad salvages a ship whose crew has been poisoned. On board, he finds a map to the lost treasure of Alexander the Great on the fabled island of Deryabar. However, when he sails to Basra, the ship is confiscated by the local khan, to be sold at auction. Sinbad obtains an agreement that he may keep the ship if there are no bids. He discourages all of the bidders with insinuations that the ship may be cursed. At the last moment, a veiled woman named Shireen appears, a member of the harem of the powerful emir of Daibul. When Sinbad bids against her, he owes an enormous sum that he cannot pay. He steals the auctioneer's money to pay for the ship.

Visiting Shireen that night in her garden, Sinbad learns of a mysterious and deadly person known as Jamal who will stop at nothing to acquire the treasure. Jamal, only vaguely seen behind a curtain, makes an attempt on Sinbad's life. Sinbad escapes and steals the ship, acquiring a rough crew to man it. Strange stories of the evil Jamal circulate among the crew, but no one alive has ever seen him.

After several days, Sinbad sails to another port (that of Daibul) and risks death to visit Shireen in the harem. He is captured, but because the emir believes him to be the prince of Deryabar, he becomes his guest. With smooth talking and some trickery, Sinbad escapes again, taking Shireen along. They set sail for Deryabar but are overtaken and captured by the emir. Sinbad's ship's barber Abdul Melik is revealed to be Jamal, who has memorized and destroyed the map to Deryabar. Forming an uneasy alliance of convenience, they all sail to the treasure island.

Upon arriving at Deryabar, they convince Aga, the lone resident of the ruins of Alexander's palace, that Sinbad is his lost son, as evidenced by a medal that Sinbad has owned since childhood. When the emir threatens to kill Sinbad, Sinbad confesses his true identity as an ordinary sailor. Aga capitulates and shows them the hiding place of the fabulous treasure. He later informs Sinbad that he had given his son to sailors to shield him from treasure hunters. Sinbad is indeed his son and the true prince of Deryabar.

When it is discovered that Jamal had intended to poison the emir and his crew in order to have the treasure for himself, the emir forces him to drink the deadly liquid. Sinbad escapes again, boards the emir's ship and frees his crew. The emir is killed by Greek fire catapulted at him from his own ship.

The disbelieving listeners around the campfire accuse Sinbad of telling yet another tall tale, but soon change their minds when he distributes precious jewels and gold. The beautiful Shireen appears and they board the ship for their return to Deryabar as Sinbad relates the moral of the tale: true happiness is found in things other than material wealth.

== Cast ==
- Douglas Fairbanks Jr. as Sinbad
- Maureen O'Hara as Shireen
- Walter Slezak as Melik
- Anthony Quinn as Emir
- George Tobias as Abbu
- Jane Greer as Pirouze
- Mike Mazurki as Yusuf
- Sheldon Leonard as Auctioneer
- Alan Napier as Aga
- John Miljan as Moga
- Brad Dexter as Muallin

== Production ==
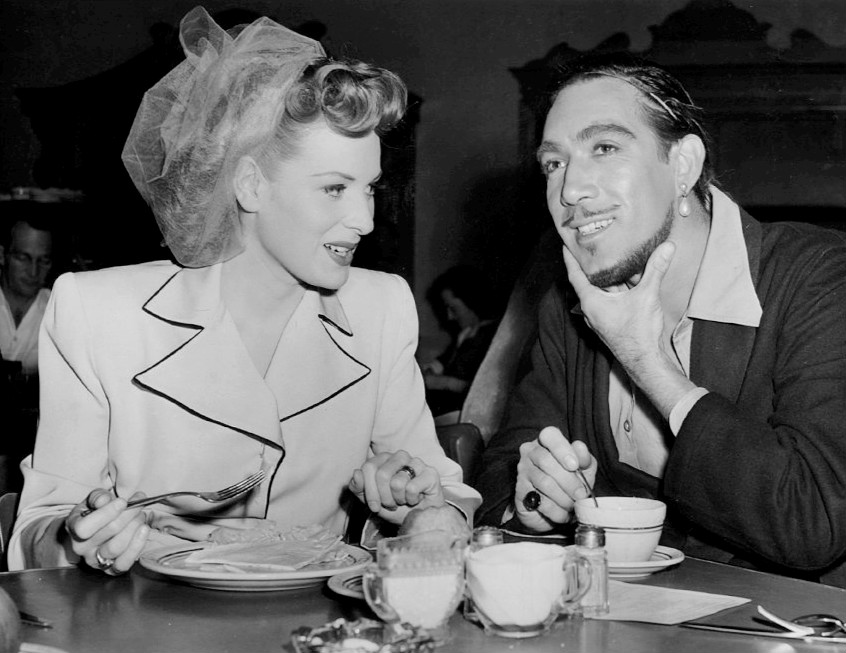
Maureen O'Hara and Anthony Quinn lunching together during filming

Planning began in March 1944 when The Hollywood Reporter announced that the film was to be produced by William Pereira under the supervision of Jack Gross. RKO borrowed George Tobias from Warner Bros. for the production. Ellis St. John wrote an original screenplay.

In October 1945, RKO announced that Maureen O'Hara would star in the film. John Twist was already writing a new screenplay, while Stephen Ames was producing the feature. The film's production budget was set at $2,500,000. By December, Walter Slezak had been cast as the villain. He and O'Hara had starred together in RKO's popular swashbuckler The Spanish Main (1945).

RKO signed Douglas Fairbanks Jr. in December 1945 to star as Sinbad, his first feature-film role after serving five years in the navy during World War II. He convinced the studio to engage a number of supporting actors and stuntmen who had worked with his father Douglas Fairbanks in silent films.

Fairbanks announced that Sinbad the Sailor would be the last film in which he would appear for a set salary. As part of his deal, he was afforded an office with a secretary and was allowed input on the screenplay, sets and wardrobe.

In January 1946, Richard Wallace agreed to direct the film.

Filming began in February 1946.

== Release ==
RKO had originally planned to release the film for the 1946 Christmas season, but a strike at the Technicolor processing plant delayed the processing of the color prints. The release date was therefore moved to January 13, 1947, and RKO instead chose Frank Capra's black-and-white It's a Wonderful Life as its featured 1946 Christmas film.

The film cost $2,459,000 to be produced and returned a modest profit at the box office. Douglas Fairbanks Jr. later said: "Errol Flynn told me I'd made a big mistake because nobody was interested in swashbuckling, and I had to agree. Receipts were thin."

== Reception ==
In a contemporary review for The New York Times, critic Bosley Crowther praised Fairbanks: "There is no doubt about it: Mr. Fairbanks makes a reasonable facsimile of his old man. ... In short, it is quite a pleasure—and quite a reminder, too—to watch young Mr. Fairbanks cut loose in a gymnastic role." However, Crowther found fault with the plot: "But, unfortunately the somewhat bookish writers who prepared his lengthy script were no Scheherazades at telling an engaging tale. ... Frankly, we can't quite inform you of the convolutions of a verbal plot which finds Sinbad snarled in complexities in trying to reach a lost island of fabled gold. Nor can we precisely apprise you of the several contenders in the search, one of whom is a beautiful woman. The plot is too thick for us—and we rather suspect that it will baffle even more analytic minds."

== See also ==
- Sinbad the Sailor (1935 film)
- One Thousand and One Nights
