= Big Town Ideas =

1921 film

- Directed by: Carl Harbaugh
- Written by: John Montague
- Produced by: William Fox
- Starring: Eileen Percy; Laura La Plante; James Parrott
- Cinematography: Otto Brautigan
- Production company: Fox Film
- Distributed by: Fox Film
- Release date: June 5, 1921
- Running time: 50 minutes
- Country: United States
- Languages: Silent; English intertitles

Big Town Ideas is a 1921 American silent comedy film directed by Carl Harbaugh and starring Eileen Percy, Laura La Plante and James Parrott. It was produced and distributed by Fox Film.

== Cast ==
- Eileen Percy as Fan Tilden
- Kenneth Gibson as Alan Dix
- James Parrott as Spick Sprague
- Lon Poff as Deputy
- Laura La Plante as Molly Dorn
- Leo Sulky as George Small
- Harry DeRoy as Bald-headed Man
- Lefty James as Warden
- Lawrence A. Bowes as Governor
- Paul Kamp as Grocer's Boy
- Paul Cazeneuve as Show Manager
- Clarence Wilson as Chef
- Jess Aldridge as Governor's Bodyguard

== Bibliography ==
- Munden, Kenneth White. The American Film Institute Catalog of Motion Pictures Produced in the United States, Part 1. University of California Press, 1997.
