= Eileen Percy =

American actress

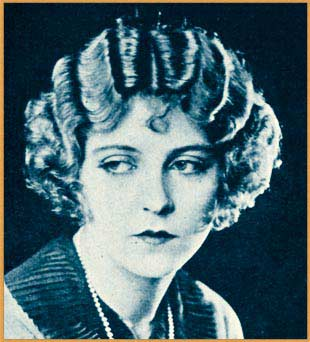
- Percy in 1925
- Born: 21 August 1902; Belfast, Ireland
- Died: 29 July 1973 (aged 70); Los Angeles, California, US
- Occupation: Actress
- Years active: 1917–1933
- Spouses: Ulrich Busch (m. 1919; div. 1930); Harry Ruby (m. 1936)

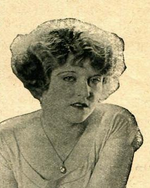
The Flirt (1922)

Eileen Percy (21 August 1902 – 29 July 1973) was an Irish-born American actress of the silent era. She appeared in more than 60 films between 1917 and 1933.

== Biography ==
Born in Belfast in August 1902, Percy lived in Brooklyn, New York, briefly in 1903 before returning to Belfast. She came back to Brooklyn at age nine, attending a convent school there. After graduating from the convent, she became a model for artists, including Charles Dana Gibson. Some of the pictures for which she posed were used for magazine covers.

After her film career ended, Percy became a staff correspondent for the Pittsburgh Post-Gazette.

In 1919, Percy married Ulrich Busch. They divorced in 1930. Her second husband from 1936 was songwriter Harry Ruby.

She died in Los Angeles, California, in 1973. Her remains are buried at Chapel of the Pines Crematory.

She was portrayed by Arlene Dahl in Three Little Words (1950).

== Partial filmography ==
- Down to Earth (1917)
- The Man from Painted Post (1917)
- Wild and Woolly (1917)
- Reaching for the Moon (1917)
- Hitting the High Spots (1918)
- The Gray Horizon (1919)
- Told in the Hills (1919)
- In Mizzoura (1919)
- Some Liar (1919)
- The Beloved Cheater (1919)
- Brass Buttons (1919)
- Desert Gold (1919)
- Where the West Begins (1919)
- One-Thing-at-a-Time O'Day (1919)
- The Third Eye (1920)
- The Land of Jazz (1920)
- Hickville to Broadway (1921)
- The Blushing Bride (1921)
- Big Town Ideas (1921)
- Why Trust Your Husband? (1921)
- The Flirt (1922)
- The Fast Mail (1922)
- Elope If You Must (1922)
- The Flirt (1922)
- The Prisoner (1923)
- East Side - West Side (1923)
- The Fourth Musketeer (1923)
- Yesterday's Wife (1923)
- Let's Go (1923)
- Tongues of Flame (1924)
- Missing Daughters (1924)
- Souls for Sables (1925)
- Under the Rouge (1925)
- The Shadow on the Wall (1925)
- Fine Clothes (1925)
- The Unchastened Woman (1925)
- Cobra (1925)
- The Phantom Bullet (1926)
- That Model from Paris (1926)
- Lovey Mary (1926)
- Burnt Fingers (1927)
- Backstage (1927)
- Twelve Miles Out (1927)
- Spring Fever (1927)
- The Broadway Hoofer (1929)
- Temptation (1930)
- Wicked (1931)
- First Aid (1942)
