= Little Church Around the Corner (film) =

1923 film directed by William A. Seiter

The Little Church Around the Corner
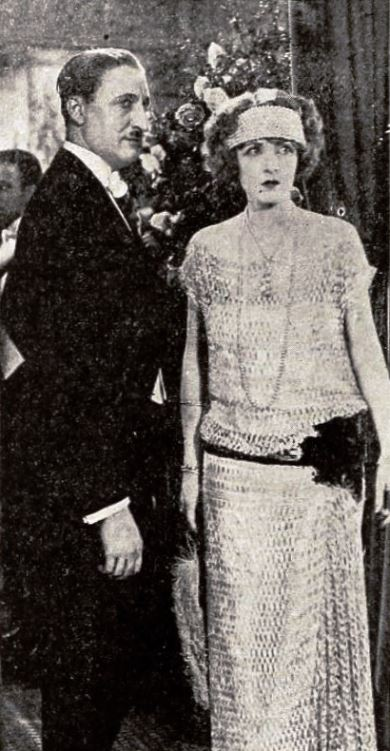
- Film still
- Directed by: William A. Seiter
- Screenplay by: Olga Printzlau
- Story by: Charles E. Blaney
- Based on: Little Church Around the Corner by Marion Russell
- Starring: Claire Windsor; Kenneth Harlan; Hobart Bosworth; Pauline Starke; Walter Long; Cyril Chadwick
- Cinematography: Edwin B. DuPar; Homer Scott
- Edited by: C.R. Wallace
- Production company: Warner Bros.
- Distributed by: Warner Bros.
- Release date: March 1923
- Running time: 70 minutes
- Country: United States
- Language: Silent (English intertitles)
- Budget: $141,000
- Box office: $358,000

The Little Church Around the Corner, or simply Little Church Around the Corner, is a 1923 American silent drama film directed by William A. Seiter and written by Olga Printzlau. The film stars Claire Windsor, Kenneth Harlan, Hobart Bosworth, Pauline Starke, Walter Long, and Cyril Chadwick. The film was released by Warner Bros. in March 1923.

== Cast ==
- Claire Windsor as Leila Morton
- Kenneth Harlan as David Graham
- Hobart Bosworth as John Morton
- Pauline Starke as Hetty Burrows
- Walter Long as Big Hex Poulon
- Cyril Chadwick as Mark Hanford
- Alec B. Francis as Reverend Bradley
- Winter Hall as Doc
- Margaret Seddon as Mrs. Wallace
- George Cooper as Jude Burrows
- Stanton Heck as Burt Wilson
- Fred R. Stanton as The Sheriff
- Winston Miller as Little David
- Mary Jane Irving as Little Hetty

== Box office ==
According to Warner Bros records the film earned $324,000 domestically and $28,000 foreign.

== Preservation ==
With no holdings located in archives, Little Church Around the Corner is considered a lost film.
