= The Blushing Bride =

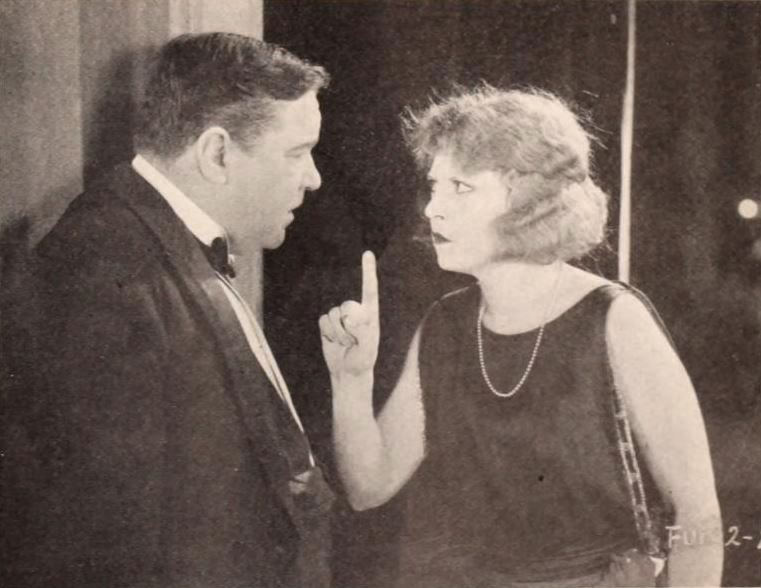
- A still from the film
- Directed by: Jules Furthman
- Written by: Jules Furthman
- Produced by: William Fox
- Starring: Eileen Percy; Herbert Hayes; Philo McCullough
- Cinematography: Otto Brautigan
- Production company: Fox Film Corporation
- Release date: February 27, 1921
- Running time: 5 reels
- Country: United States
- Language: Silent (English intertitles)

The Blushing Bride is a 1921 comedy film directed by Jules Furthman. It was produced by the Fox Film Corporation.

== Plot ==
Beth Rupert, in "The Blushing Bride," has been a chorus girl in the Follies. She suddenly yields to the advances of Kingdon Ames, a rich young suitor, and they are married. Beth says she is a niece of the Duke of Castor Royal and since she is supposed to be of English birth, the young husband believes her.

On the arrival at the home of Ames' parents. Beth gets an early shock. The family butler is none other than her Uncle Harry. They both dissemble. Further complications arise over the sudden arrival of the Duke of Castor Royal and his wife. Uncle Harry recognizes in the latter his own divorced wife, and he discovers that the bogus duke is his cousin.

Beth is caught kissing Uncle Harry by one of the servants. They lock up this servant and make a prisoner of the bogus duke. Two detectives, who are seeking evidence in connection with the various parties concerned, take a hand in matters. Dick Irving, a former lover of Beth, is trying to help her in the midst of these difficulties. He falls into the large Roman pool and the butler later follows suit. When explanations finally occur, it develops that Uncle Harry is really the Duke of Castor Royal and that the title was falsely assumed by his cousin, who thought him dead

== Cast ==
- Eileen Percy as Beth Rupert
- Herbert Heyes as Kingdom Ames
- Philo McCullough as Dick Irving
- Jack La Reno as K. Ames
- Rose Dione as Mrs. K. Ames
- Harry Dunkinson as Butler
- Bertram Johns as Duke of Downcastle
- Herschel Mayall as Lord Landsmere
- Sylvia Ashton as Mrs. Jane Horton-Kemp
- Earl Crain as Mr. Scanlon

== Reception ==
A contemporary review in The Moving Picture World was negative, claiming that the film lacked suspense and humor. A review in the Fresno Morning Republican was more positive, calling it "a farce that will cause you to hold your ribs to keep them from splitting".
