= John Twist =

American screenwriter

- Born: July 14, 1898; Albany, Missouri, U.S.
- Died: February 11, 1976 (aged 77); Beverly Hills, California, U.S.
- Occupations: Screenwriter, film producer
- Years active: 1927–1965

John Twist (July 14, 1898 – February 11, 1976) was an American screenwriter and film producer whose career spanned four decades.

== Biography ==
Born in Albany, Missouri, Twist began his career in the silent film era, providing the story for such films as Breed of Courage (1927) and The Big Diamond Robbery (1929). He earned his first screenwriting credit for The Yellowback in 1929.

He is best remembered for his prolific writing contributions to Western films, notably Colorado Territory (1949), Dallas (1950), and A Distant Trumpet (1964), as well as the adventure film Sinbad the Sailor (1947).

His last credit was for co-scripting the war drama None but the Brave (1965).

Twist died of a heart attack in Beverly Hills, California, at the age of 77.

== Filmography ==
- Breed of Courage (1927) - story
- The Big Diamond Robbery (1929) - story
- Little Women (1933)
- La Cucaracha (1934)
- Annie Oakley (1935)
- Another Face (1935)
- The Last Outlaw (1936)
- We Who Are About to Die (1937)
- The Toast of New York (1937)
- Next Time I Marry (1938)
- The Great Man Votes (1939)
- The Saint Strikes Back (1939)
- Too Many Girls (1940)
- Four Jacks and a Jill (1942) - screenwriter and producer
- Powder Town (1942)
- Pittsburgh (1942)
- Bombardier (1943)
- This Man's Navy (1945)
- Sinbad the Sailor (1947)
- Tycoon (1947)
- Colorado Territory (1949)
- Dallas (1950)
- Fort Worth (1951)
- The Big Trees (1952)
- So Big (1953)
- King Richard and the Crusaders (1954)
- The Sea Chase (1955)
- Helen of Troy (1956)
- Serenade (1956)
- Santiago (1956)
- Band of Angels (1957)
- The Deep Six (1958)
- The FBI Story (1959)
- Esther and the King (1960) - associate producer
- A Distant Trumpet (1964)
- None but the Brave (1965)
