= Jelm-Frank Smith Ranch Historic District =

Historic district in Wyoming, United States

- U.S. National Register of Historic Places
- U.S. Historic district
- Location within Wyoming
- Nearest city: Woods Landing, Wyoming
- Coordinates: 41.05799°N 106.01307°W
- Area: 400 acres (160 ha)
- Built: 1879
- Architectural style: Log Cabin style
- NRHP reference No.: 78002816
- Added to NRHP: August 31, 1978

The Jelm-Frank Smith Ranch Historic District, also known as Old Jelm and Cummins City, comprises an area of bottomland on the Laramie River near Woods Landing, Wyoming where the mining boomtown of Cummins City, Wyoming was established in 1880. Gold had been discovered in the nearby mountains and the town was established by W.S. "Buck" Bramel and John Cummins. In 1881 Cummins City was described as having about 100 houses and a hotel. By this time the camp was already declining, and by 1886 mining in the district was largely inactive. However, in the 1890s copper was discovered in the Sierra Madre and Medicine Bow ranges. Cummins City was revived as Jelm in 1900. This boom also declined and in 1930 Jelm's population was 50.

Frank Smith worked in Cummins City and Jelm during the mining booms and remained afterwards, establishing a homestead. Smith died in 1945 having expanded his holdings to 10,000 acres (4,000 ha). The ranch buildings comprise the principle remnants of Jelm. Nineteen buildings comprise the historic district. Most are of log construction on stone foundations. Buildings include a combination school/chutrch, several sheds, houses, cabins, barns and dugouts, a bar, an oculist's shop and the ranch headquarters.

Jelm was the setting for location shooting for the Douglas Fairbanks, Sr. movie The Man from Painted Post in 1917 after the crew was asked to leave Rock River by a disapproving mayor.

The Jelm-Frank Smith Ranch Historic District was established on August 31, 1978.
