= Harry Dunkinson =

American actor

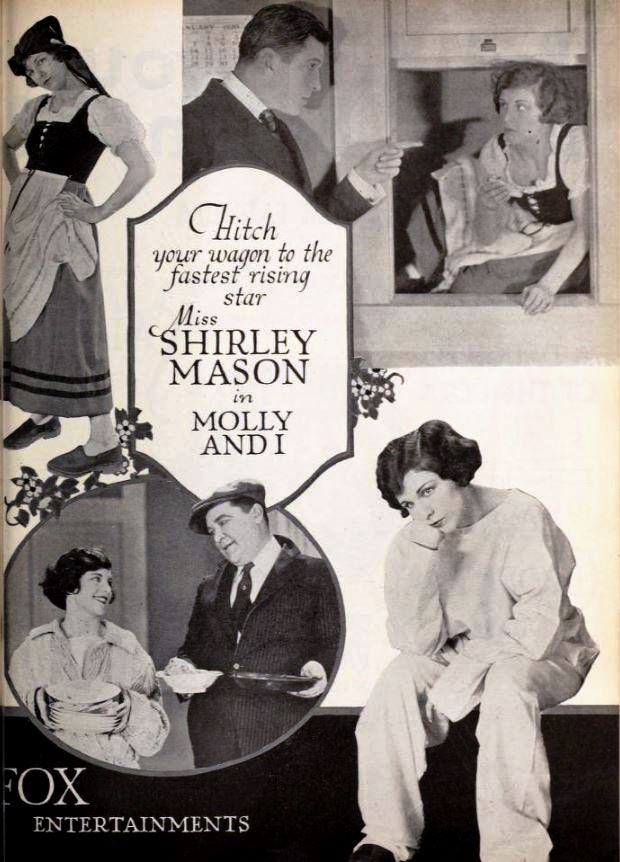
- Dunkinson (lower left) with Mason in advertisement for Molly and I (1920)
- Born: December 16, 1876; New York City, US
- Died: March 14, 1936 (aged 59); California, US
- Years active: 1912–1935

Harry Dunkinson (December 16, 1876 – March 14, 1936) was an American film and stage actor. He appeared in more than 140 films between 1912 and 1935. He was born in New York City and died in California.

Dunkinson began acting on stage when he was nine years old. His work in films began with Essanay. He worked primarily in silent films, with his roles diminishing after sound films were introduced.

== Selected filmography ==
- The Battle of Love (1914) - Jack Sanford
- The Slim Princess (1915) - Count Selim Malagaski
- The Broken Pledge (1915, Short) - Harold
- The Blindness of Virtue (1915) - Aberlady's butler
- In the Palace of the King (1915) - Priest
- The Crimson Wing (1915) - Don Rodrigo Valera
- The Raven (1915) - Tony
- The Misleading Lady (1916) - Boney
- The Strange Case of Mary Page (1916) - E.H. Daniels, Show Manager
- Skinner's Dress Suit (1917) - Willard Jackson
- The Trufflers (1917) - Abe Silverstone
- Filling His Own Shoes (1917)
- On Trial (1917) - Attorney for the Defense
- Follow the Girl (1917) - Hong Foo
- The Edge of the Law (1917) - Spike
- Danger Within (1918) - Dr. Trevick
- Selfish Yates (1918) - Ed Miller, the 'Oklahoma Hog'
- A Soul for Sale (1918) - Wilbur Simons
- Kidder & Ko (1918) - Silas Kidder
- The Brass Bullet (1918)
- The Forbidden Room (1919) - Police Chief
- The Rebellious Bride (1919) - Jimmy O'Shay
- The Coming of the Law (1919) - Sheriff
- A Rogue's Romance (1919)
- Chasing Rainbows (1919) - Jerry
- Love Is Love (1919) - Dave Wilson
- The Willow Tree (1920) - Jeoffrey Fuller
- Rouge and Riches (1920) - Max Morko
- The Daredevil (1920) - Ranch Owner
- Molly and I (1920) - Jack Herrick
- Forbidden Trails (1920) - Henry Parsons
- The Husband Hunter (1920) - Arthur Elkins
- Officer 666 (1920) - Policeman Phelan - Officer 666
- Beware of the Bride (1920) - Pete Noble
- Prairie Trails (1920) - Ike Stork
- The Land of Jazz (1920) - Mr. Dumbardon
- Why Trust Your Husband? (1921) - Uncle Horace
- The Blushing Bride (1921) - Butler
- The Tomboy (1921) - The Circus Manager
- A Ridin' Romeo (1921) - King Brentwood
- The Big Town Round-Up (1921) - Luther Beaumont
- The Primal Law (1921) - Carson
- The Last Trail (1921) - Kenworth Samson
- The Duke of Chimney Butte (1921) - Jedlick
- Trailin' (1921) - Sandy Ferguson (uncredited)
- The Fast Mail (1922) - Harry Joyce
- Mine to Keep (1923) - Sewell
- Soft Boiled (1923) - The Storekeeper
- Sting of the Scorpion (1923)
- Bag and Baggage (1923) - Hotel Detective
- Gentle Julia (1923) - Uncle Joe Atwater
- The Diamond Bandit (1924) - Friar Michael
- The Last Man on Earth (1924) - Elmer's Father
- Lash of the Whip (1924)
- The Desert's Price (1925) - Sheriff
- A Bankrupt Honeymoon (1926, Short) - Harold's Lawyer
- Lash of the Whip (1926) - Pinto's servant
- Mulhall's Greatest Catch (1926) - Con McCarren
- Doubling with Danger (1926) - Detective McCade
- Smile, Brother, Smile (1927) - Mr. Potter
- Silver Valley (1927) - Mike McCool
- Sporting Goods (1928)
- Dressed to Kill (1928)
- The Farmer's Daughter (1928) - (uncredited)
- Amateur Daddy (1932) - Fat Hicks (uncredited)
- Tillie and Gus (1933) - Bartender (uncredited)
- Design for Living (1933) - Mr. Egelbauer (uncredited)
- David Harum (1934) - Townsman (uncredited)
- Stand Up and Cheer! (1934) - Quartet Member (uncredited)
- Ferocious Pal (1934) - Sheriff Dick Williams
- Another Wild Idea (1934, Short) - Judge (uncredited)
- Going Bye-Bye! (1934, Short) - Judge (uncredited)
- Servants' Entrance (1934) - Innkeeper (uncredited)
- The Captain Hates the Sea (1934) - Passenger (uncredited)
- I'll Fix It (1934) - Minor Role (uncredited)
- Broadway Bill (1934) - (uncredited)
- The County Chairman (1935) - (uncredited)
- The Whole Town's Talking (1935) - Customer (uncredited)
- Life Begins at 40 (1935) - Abercrombie's Friend (uncredited)
- George White's 1935 Scandals (1935) - Postman (uncredited)
- Vagabond Lady (1935) - Dock Official (uncredited)
- This Is the Life (1935) - Mailman (uncredited)
- Grand Exit (1935) - Mueller (uncredited)
- Thanks a Million (1935) - Politician (uncredited)
- Nevada (1935) - Poker Player
