= Soft Boiled =

1923 film

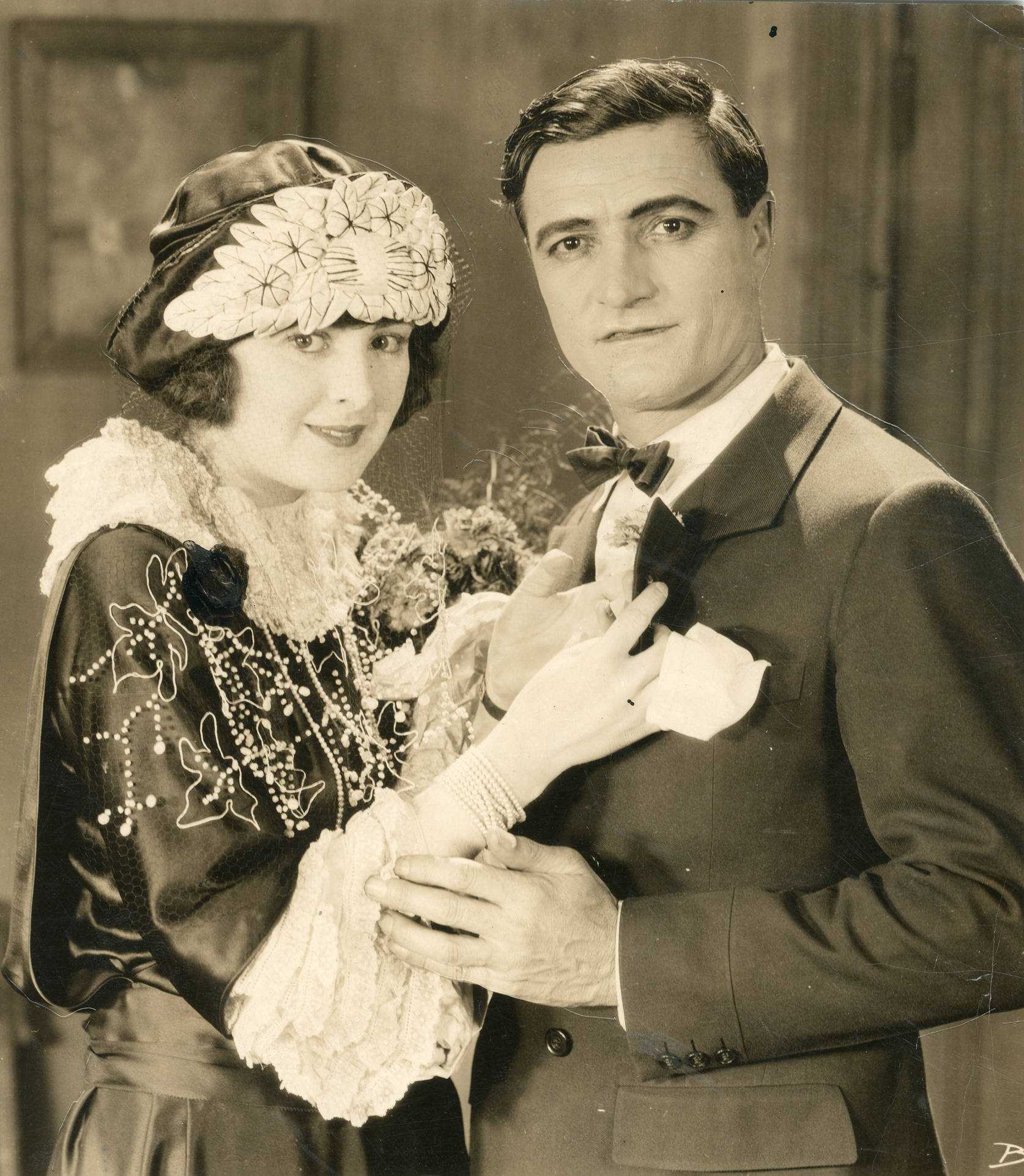
- Still with Billie Dove and Tom Mix
- Directed by: John G. Blystone
- Screenplay by: John G. Blystone
- Story by: John G. Blystone; Eddie Moran
- Starring: Tom Mix; Billie Dove; Joseph W. Girard; Lee Shumway; Tom Wilson; Frank Beal
- Cinematography: Daniel B. Clark
- Production company: Fox Film Corporation
- Distributed by: Fox Film Corporation
- Release date: August 26, 1923
- Running time: 80 minutes
- Country: United States
- Languages: Silent; English intertitles

Soft Boiled is a 1923 American silent comedy Western film written and directed by John G. Blystone. The film stars Tom Mix, Billie Dove, Joseph W. Girard, Lee Shumway, Tom Wilson, and Frank Beal. The film was released on August 26, 1923, by Fox Film Corporation.

== Plot ==
Tom Steele and his uncle John Steele both struggle with short tempers. While Tom has diligently worked to manage his temper, John decides to test his progress. He challenges Tom, betting that he cannot go an entire month without losing his temper.

Having successfully completed the challenge of controlling his temper for an entire month, Tom Steele finds himself in a precarious situation. The insults hurled during the bet at his sweetheart prove to be the proverbial straw that breaks the camel's back.

== Cast ==
- Tom Mix as Tom Steele
- Billie Dove as The Girl
- Joseph W. Girard as The Ranch Owner
- Lee Shumway as The Road House Manager
- Tom Wilson as The Butler
- Frank Beal as John Steele
- Jack Curtis as The Ranch Foreman
- Charles Hill Mailes as The Lawyer
- Harry Dunkinson as The Storekeeper
- Clarence Wilson as The Reformer
- Tony the Horse as Tony

== Preservation ==
A complete copy of Soft Boiled is located at the George Eastman Museum.
