= Scott Beal =

American actor (1890–1973)

Scott R. Beal
- Born: April 11, 1890; Quinnesec, Michigan, U.S.
- Died: July 10, 1973 (aged 83); Hollywood
- Resting place: Inglewood Park Cemetery
- Parents: Frank Beal (father); Louise Lester (mother)

Scott R. Beal (April 14, 1890 – July 10, 1973) was a film assistant director.

Beal was the son of Frank Beal.

As an assistant director, he worked on Tod Browning's Dracula (1931) and Robert Florey's Murders in the Rue Morgue (1932).

== Selected filmography ==
- Torment (1924)
- Classified (1925)
- Her Sister from Paris (1925); assistant director
