= Mismated =

- Directed by: Frank Beal
- Starring: Reina Valdez
- Production company: Mutual
- Release date: 1916

Mismated is a 1916 silent two-reel romantic drama film starring Reina Valdez from Mutual. The film was directed by Frank Beal.

== Plot ==
After Flo (Valdez) is forced to marry a man she hates, she continues to dream about her true love. Living in a small fishing town, she eventually takes the lead role in a local play with a plot that is similar with that of her own life. One day, she finds out that her true love is wrecked at sea, and she begs her husband to go look for him. During the rescue attempt, Flo's true love is saved, although her husband perishes, but not before asking for Flo's forgiveness.

== Cast ==
- Reina Valdez as Flo
- Richard L'Estrange as Flo's Betrothed
- Harry Schenck as The Rival
