= The Best Bad Man =

1925 film

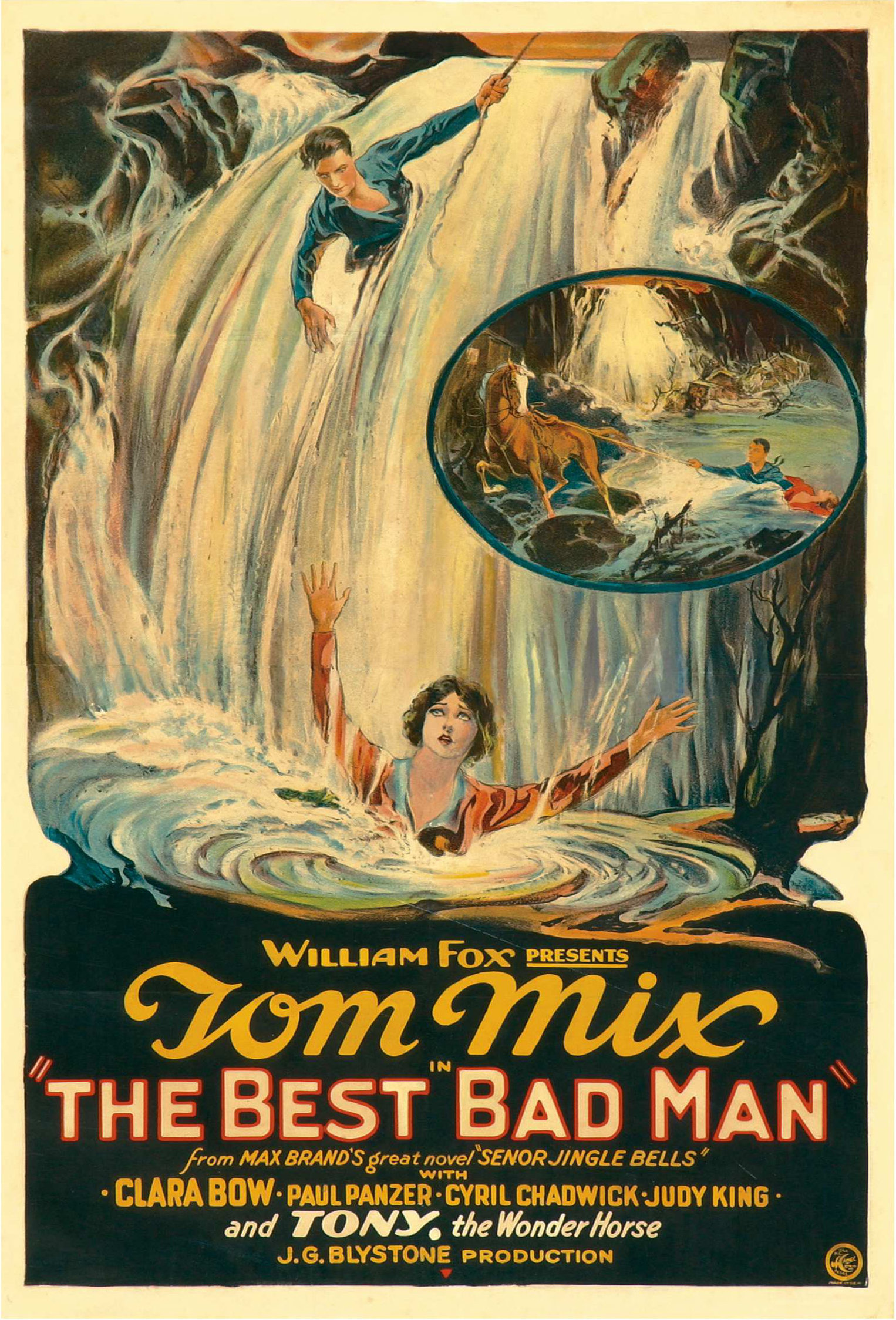
- Theatrical release poster
- Directed by: John G. Blystone
- Screenplay by: Lillie Hayward
- Based on: "Senor Jingle Bells" by Max Brand
- Starring: Tom Mix; Buster Gardner; Cyril Chadwick; Clara Bow; Tom Kennedy; Frank Beal
- Cinematography: Daniel B. Clark
- Production company: Fox Film Corporation
- Distributed by: Fox Film Corporation
- Release date: November 29, 1925
- Running time: 50 minutes
- Country: United States
- Languages: Silent; English intertitles

The Best Bad Man is a 1925 American silent Western film directed by John G. Blystone and written by Lillie Hayward. The film stars Tom Mix, Buster Gardner, Cyril Chadwick, Clara Bow, Tom Kennedy, and Frank Beal. The film was released on November 29, 1925, by Fox Film Corporation.

== Plot ==
As described in a review in a film magazine, Hugh Nichols is a wealthy tenderfoot idler who has never taken life seriously until a westerner demands that he complete a dam on his property that was promised by his father and is necessary for a score of ranches. As Hugh has already sent money to complete this project, he determines to investigate for himself, and disguises himself as a peddler of musical instruments. He finds that his agent is a crook, steals his own money back, and resists arrest until he can be identified. In the meantime he has fallen in love with Peggy, the leader of the ranchers. The villain dynamites the dam and Hugh saves the young woman.

== Cast ==
- Tom Mix as Hugh Nichols
- Clara Bow as Peggy Swain
- Cyril Chadwick as Frank Dunlap
- Paul Panzer as Sheriff
- Judy King as Molly Jones
- Tony the Wonder Horse as Hugh's Horse
- Buster Gardner as Hank Smith
- Tom Kennedy as Dan Ellis
- Frank Beal as Mr. Swain
- Tom Wilson as Sam

== See also ==
- Tom Mix filmography

== Preservation status ==
A print of The Best Bad Man survives with the Museum of Modern Art, New York City.
