= The Hoose-Gow =

1929 film

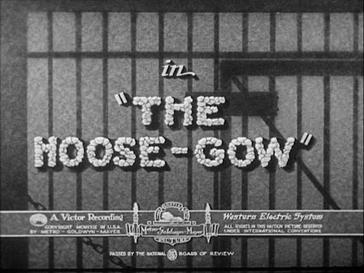
- Title card
- Directed by: James Parrott
- Written by: H.M. Walker; Nat Hoffberg; Leo McCarey
- Produced by: Hal Roach
- Starring: Stan Laurel; Oliver Hardy
- Cinematography: Paul Kerschner; Len Powers; George Stevens
- Edited by: Richard C. Currier
- Music by: William Axt; Spencer Williams
- Production company: Hal Roach Studios
- Distributed by: Metro-Goldwyn-Mayer
- Release date: November 16, 1929
- Running time: 20:07
- Country: United States
- Language: English

The Hoose-Gow is a 1929 American short comedy film starring Laurel and Hardy, directed by James Parrott, and produced by Hal Roach.

== Plot ==
The Hoose-Gow (1929)

Stan Laurel and Oliver Hardy find themselves embroiled in a comedic misadventure upon their arrival as new inmates at a prison, purportedly implicated in a prohibition raid, an assertion they vehemently deny to a prison officer, claiming mere bystander status.

During their initial encounter with the prison guard, the duo's attempt to communicate with friends beyond the prison wall results in the unexpected appearance of a rope ladder. Seizing the opportunity for escape, their cohorts hastily retreat, leaving Stan and Ollie stranded outside when the guard inadvertently shuts the door on them. Their subsequent return is marked by the indignity of shotgun fire, leaving the seats of their trousers in tatters.

Assigned to outdoor labor, Stan and Ollie find themselves thrust into the peculiar dynamics of prison life, where fellow inmates humorously designate the guard's dinner table as their own. Tasked with felling a tree, their clumsy efforts culminate in a calamitous event as the timber collapses onto the guard's tent, coinciding inconveniently with the arrival of the prison governor.

Subsequently reassigned to ditch-digging duty alongside their fellow convicts, the hapless duo's plight worsens when Stan's errant pick-axe inadvertently punctures the radiator of the governor's car, instigating a series of farcical events. In a misguided attempt to rectify the situation, they endeavor to remedy the damage by filling the radiator with dry rice, following the advice of a fellow inmate. However, their makeshift repair yields unexpected consequences as the rice transforms into a chaotic eruption resembling rice pudding, sparking a whimsical rice-throwing melee involving the visiting governor and his entourage.

== Cast ==
- Stan Laurel as Stan
- Oliver Hardy as Ollie
- Tiny Sandford as Warden
- Jimmy Finlayson as Governor
- Charlie Hall as Treetop Lookout
- Leo Willis as Leo
- Symona Boniface as Governor's guest
- Ellinor Vanderveer as Governor's guest
- Retta Palmer as Governor's guest
- Sam Lufkin as Prison camp officer
- Leo Sulky as Prison guard
- Dick Sutherland as Cook
- Eddie Dunn as Prisoner
- Chet Brandenburg as Prisoner
- Ed Brandenburg as Prisoner
- Baldwin Cooke as Prisoner
- Charles Dorety as Prisoner
- Ham Kinsey as Prisoner
- Tiny Ward as Prisoner
- Blackie Whiteford as Prisoner
