= The Flirt (1922 film) =

1922 film

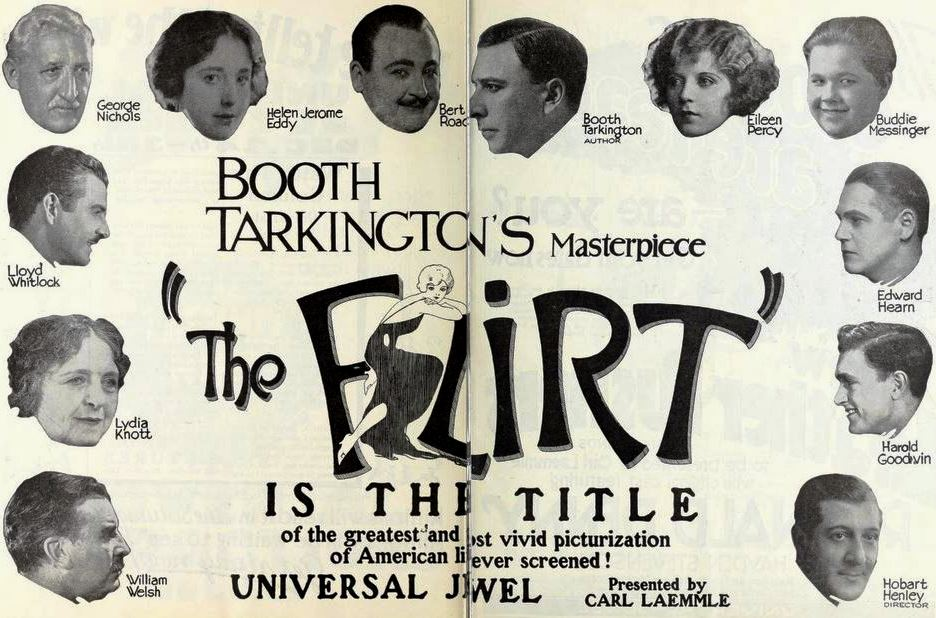
- Advertisement
- Directed by: Hobart Henley
- Written by: Andrew Percival Younger
- Based on: The Flirt; 1913 novel by Booth Tarkington
- Starring: George Nichols; Lydia Knott; Eileen Percy
- Cinematography: Charles E. Kaufman
- Distributed by: Universal Film Manufacturing Company
- Release date: December 24, 1922
- Running time: 8 reels
- Country: United States
- Language: Silent (English intertitles)

The Flirt is a 1922 American silent comedy film directed by Hobart Henley. The cast included George Nichols, Lloyd Whitlock, Lydia Knott, William Welsh, Helen Jerome Eddy, Bert Roach, Eileen Percy, Edward Hearn, Harold Goodwin, and Buddy Messinger. It was based on Booth Tarkington's 1913 novel The Flirt. It was a Carl Laemmle film produced by Universal Film Manufacturing Company. The story features a girl who insist on having things her way. A film edition of the book was published in 1922 with film stills. Sheet music for a theme song, "The Flirt; Whose Heart Are You Breaking To-Night" was also released in 1922.

== Plot ==
As described in a film magazine review, the Madison family is short of money though Papa Madison's name is good. Cora, one daughter, is selfish, lazy, and intolerant, but pretty. Her sister Laura is a reflection of her gentle mother, while Hendrick is the little pest of a kid brother. Cora's flirtations with the men of the town, the struggle of the father to make a living, how he becomes involved in a confidence game, and the eventual triumph of love make a blend of drama and comedy.

== Cast ==
- George Nichols as Papa Madison
- Lydia Knott as Mama Madison
- Eileen Percy as Cora Madison
- Helen Jerome Eddy as Laura Madison
- Buddy Messinger as Hedrick Madison (credited as Buddy Messenger)
- Harold Goodwin as Jimmy Madison
- Nell Craig as Dell Fenton
- Tom Kennedy as Sam Fenton
- Lloyd Whitlock as Valentine Corliss
- Edward Hearn as Richard Lindley
- Bert Roach as Wade Trumble
- William Welsh as George Carroll
- Dorothea Wolbert as the Cook
- True Boardman as the Goody-goody of the neighborhood (uncredited)

== Preservation ==
The Flirt is considered to be a lost film.
