= Why Trust Your Husband? =

1921 film

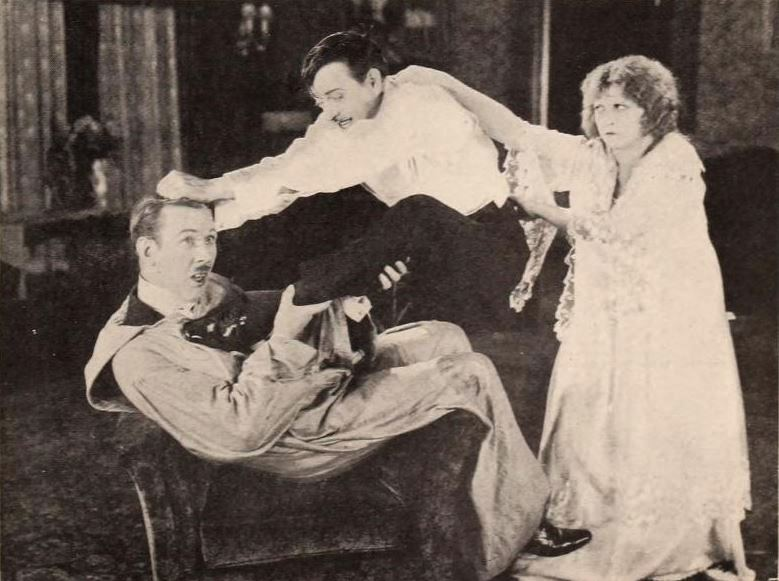
- Directed by: George Marshall
- Written by: Paul Cazeneuve; William M. Conselman; George Marshall
- Produced by: William Fox
- Starring: Eileen Percy; Harry Myers; Harry Dunkinson
- Cinematography: Lucien N. Andriot
- Production company: Fox Film Corporation
- Distributed by: Fox Film Corporation
- Release date: January 16, 1921
- Running time: 50 minutes
- Country: United States
- Languages: Silent; English intertitles

Why Trust Your Husband? is a 1921 American silent comedy film directed by George Marshall and starring Eileen Percy, Harry Myers and Harry Dunkinson.

== Plot ==
Married couple Elmer and Eunice Day visit their friends, Gilbert and Maud Stone. While visiting the men decide that they want to attend a masquerade and tell their wives that they have business engagements as an alibi. The wives, after finding the invitation to the masquerade, attend as well. Changes in costume and the attendance of Mrs. Days relatives lead to complications and misunderstandings. Eventually, everything is resolved in the police station after the masquerade is raided by the police.

== Cast ==
- Eileen Percy as Eunice Day
- Harry Myers as Elmer Day
- Ray Ripley as Joe Perry
- Harry Dunkinson as Uncle Horace
- Milla Davenport as Aunt Miranda
- Jane Miller as Maud Stone
- Hayward Mack as Gilbert Stone
- Bess True as Marie

== Bibliography ==
- Connelly, Robert B. The Silents: Silent Feature Films, 1910-36, Volume 40, Issue 2. December Press, 1998.
- Munden, Kenneth White. The American Film Institute Catalog of Motion Pictures Produced in the United States, Part 1. University of California Press, 1997.
- Solomon, Aubrey. The Fox Film Corporation, 1915-1935: A History and Filmography. McFarland, 2011.
