= Fiddlesticks (disambiguation) =

Fiddlesticks are sticks used to play rhythmic accompaniment in old-time fiddle music.

Fiddlesticks may also refer to:

- Fiddlesticks (1927 film), a silent black and white short American film
- Fiddlesticks (1930 film), an animated cartoon
- Devil sticks, a set of juggling sticks
- Fiddlesticks! a 2014 picture book by Sean Taylor
