= The Fourth Musketeer =

1923 film

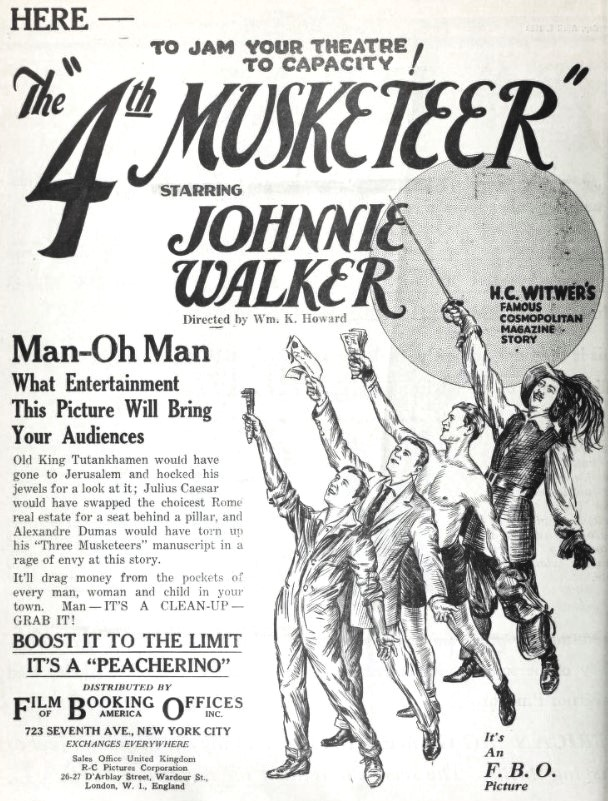
- Directed by: William K. Howard
- Written by: Paul Schofield; H.C. Witwer
- Produced by: J.G. Caldwell
- Starring: Johnnie Walker; Eileen Percy; Eddie Gribbon
- Cinematography: L. William O'Connell
- Production company: Robertson-Cole Pictures Corporation
- Distributed by: Film Booking Offices of America
- Release date: March 25, 1923
- Running time: 60 minutes
- Country: United States
- Languages: Silent; English intertitles

The Fourth Musketeer is a 1923 American silent drama film directed by William K. Howard and starring Johnnie Walker, Eileen Percy and Eddie Gribbon.

== Synopsis ==
A boxer quits the ring to set up as a garage mechanic. Life is complicated by his wife's flirtation with a high society man and some stolen jewels.

== Cast ==
- Johnnie Walker as Brien O'Brien
- Eileen Percy as Mrs. Brian O'Brien
- Eddie Gribbon as Mike Donovan
- William Scott as Joe Tracy
- Edith Yorke as Mrs. Tracy
- Georgie Stone as Jimmy Tracy
- James McElhern as Don O'Reilly
- Philo McCullough as Gerald Van Sicklen
- Kate Lester as Mrs. Rector

== Bibliography ==
- Connelly, Robert B. The Silents: Silent Feature Films, 1910-36, Volume 40, Issue 2. December Press, 1998.
- Munden, Kenneth White. The American Film Institute Catalog of Motion Pictures Produced in the United States, Part 1. University of California Press, 1997.
