= Lash of the Whip =

1924 film

- Directed by: Francis Ford
- Written by: Francis Ford
- Produced by: Ben F. Wilson
- Starring: Ashton Dearholt; Harry Dunkinson; Florence Gilbert
- Production company: Ben Wilson Productions
- Distributed by: Arrow Film Corporation
- Release date: May 1, 1924
- Running time: 50 minutes
- Country: United States
- Languages: Silent; English intertitles

Lash of the Whip is an American silent Western film released in 1924. It was written and directed by Francis Ford. The film is set in a remote town and features a ferry captain trying to keep a railroad executive and the woman accompanying him from surveying a route. A whip wielding hero repeatedly comes to their aid. The film is viewable at the Library of Congress website.

It was the first in a series of four films by the Arrow Film Corporation.

The film features rocky cliffs, desert scenery, a scenic town, and 1920s era autos as well as fisticuffs and horseback riding.

== Cast ==
- Ashton Dearholt as "Pinto" Pete
- Harry Dunkinson as His Sidekick
- Florence Gilbert as Florence
- Francis Ford as "Hurricane" Smith
- Frank Baker as Frank Blake
