= The Man from Painted Post =

1917 film

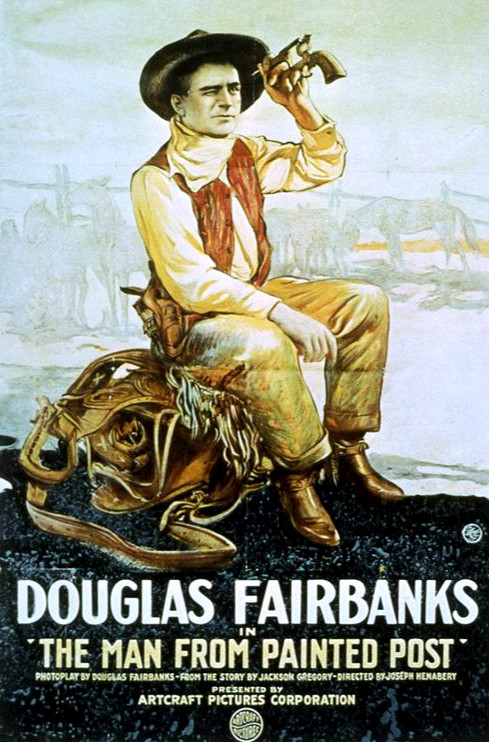
- Film poster
- Directed by: Joseph Henabery; Millard Webb (assistant director)
- Written by: Douglas Fairbanks
- Based on: Silver Slippers by Jackson Gregory
- Produced by: Douglas Fairbanks
- Starring: Douglas Fairbanks; Eileen Percy
- Cinematography: Victor Fleming
- Edited by: Joseph Henabery; Billy Shay (editorial ass't)
- Distributed by: Artcraft Pictures
- Release date: October 1, 1917
- Running time: 5 reels
- Country: United States
- Languages: Silent; English intertitles

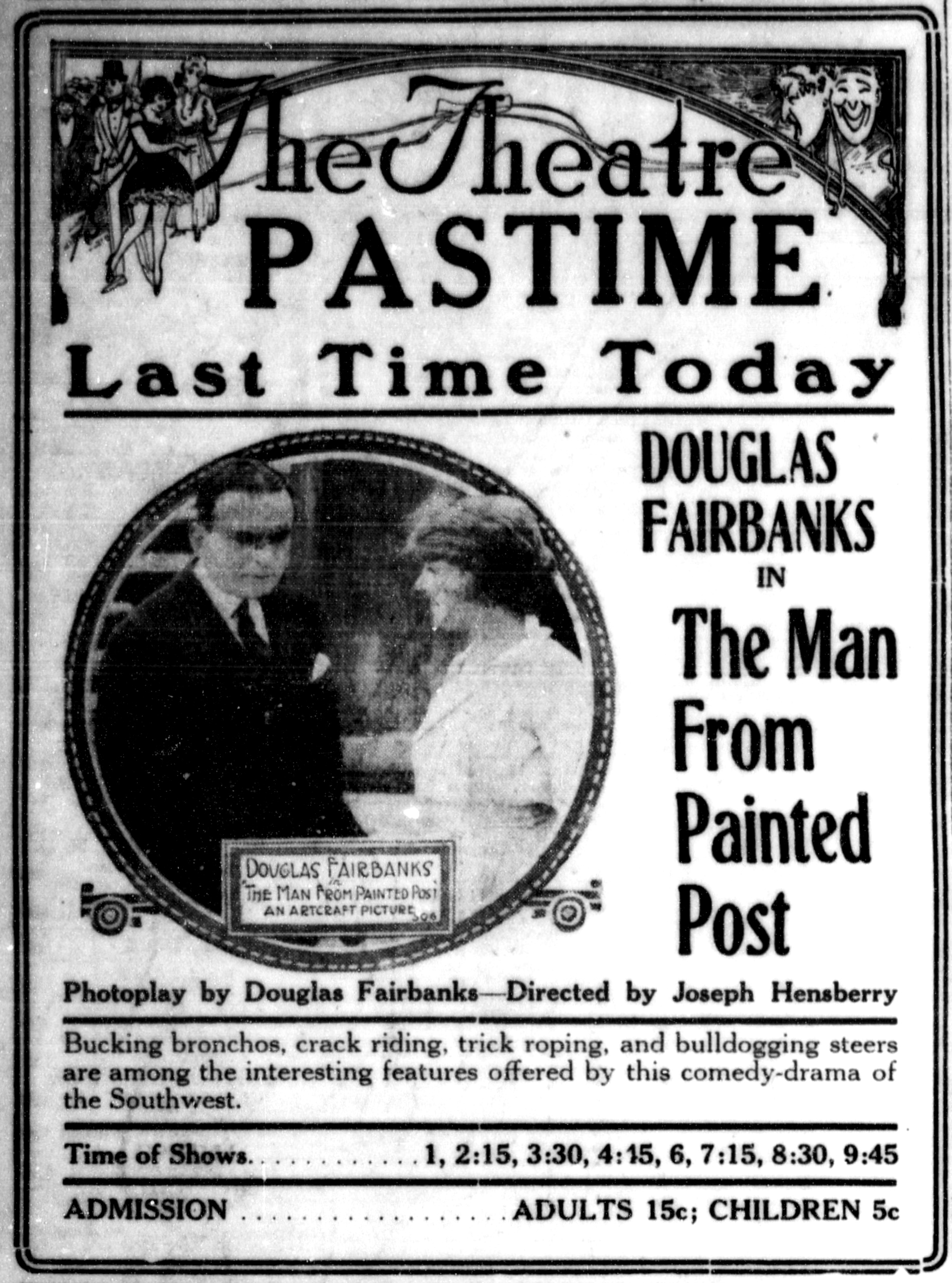
Newspaper advertisement

The Man from Painted Post is a 1917 American Western drama film produced by and starring Douglas Fairbanks. The scenario by Fairbanks is based on a short story Silver Slippers by Jackson Gregory. Joseph Henabery is the official director, with probably a lot of input by Fairbanks himself, and future director Victor Fleming is the cinematographer. A copy of the film survives in 16mm format.

== Plot ==
As described in a film magazine, Fancy Jim Sherwood, the man from Painted Post, turns to the business of hunting the bad men who infest the cattle country of Wyoming after desperate character called "30-30" Smith shoots and kills his sister. He becomes proficient in handling a six-shooter and joins the detective force that protects the cattle from rustlers. Continued loss from the Big and Little Laramie district call him hence and, in order to allay suspicion as to his real occupation, he goes in the guise of an Eastern tenderfoot who has purchased a ranch. He soon finds that Bull Madden is responsible for the cattle thefts and that he is also forcing his attentions on Jane Forbes, a girl school teacher from the East. Sherwood falls in love with her and naively suggests that she "needs some protection – a – a – a watch dog, for instance." Sherwood soon finds out that Madden is none other than "30-30" Smith, and renews his efforts to place the man under arrest. While attempting to steal some "V" ranch cattle, Madden are captured by Sherwood's men in a battle at a deserted cave where Madden and his gang have hidden the school teacher. There follows the usual sunset and fade out as with Sherwood and Jane ride into the west together.

The Man From Painted Post (1917)

== Cast ==
- Douglas Fairbanks as Fancy Jim Sherwood
- Eileen Percy as Jane Forbes, the Schoolmarm
- Frank Campeau as Bull Madden
- Frank Clark as Toby Madden
- Herbert Standing as Warren Bronson
- William Lowery as Charles Ross
- Rhea Haines as Wah-na Madden
- Charles Stevens as Tony Lopez
- Monte Blue as Slim Carter

== Production ==
The Man from Painted Post was filmed in Fort Lee, New Jersey, where many early film studios in America's first motion picture industry were based at the beginning of the 20th century. Location photography consisting of scenes of cattle country was taken near Laramie, Wyoming at Jelm.
