= Big Brother (1923 film) =

1923 film by Allan Dwan

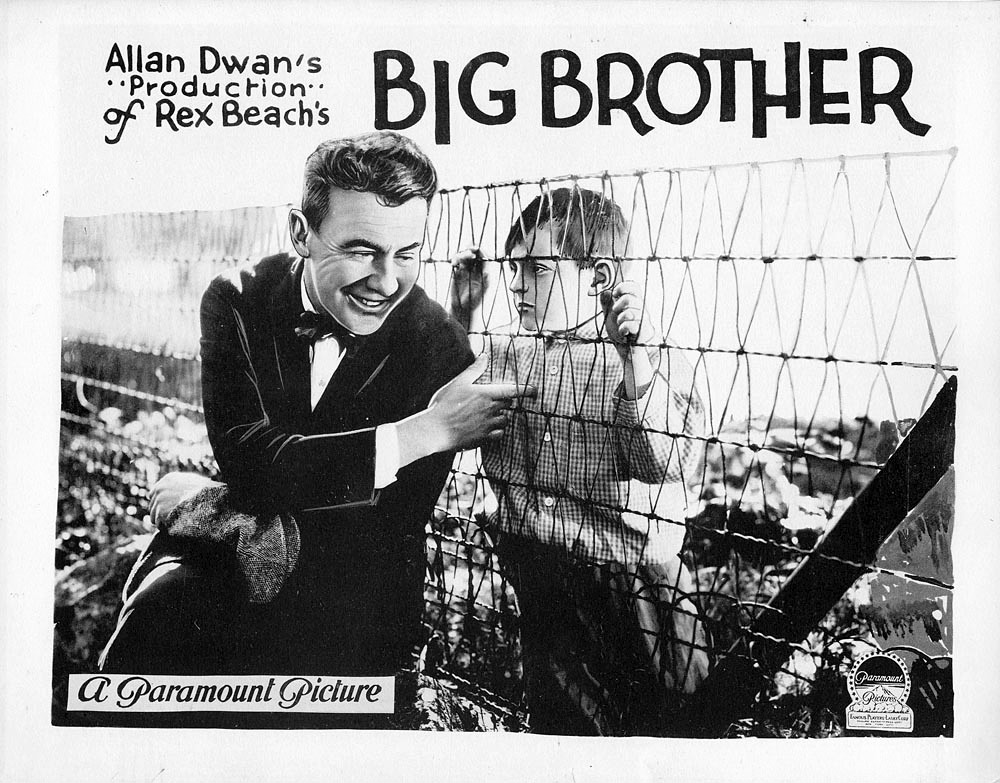
- Film poster
- Directed by: Allan Dwan
- Screenplay by: Rex Beach; Paul Sloane
- Produced by: Jesse L. Lasky; Adolph Zukor
- Starring: Tom Moore; Edith Roberts; Raymond Hatton; Joe King; Mickey Bennett; Charles Henderson; Paul Panzer
- Production company: Famous Players–Lasky Corporation
- Distributed by: Paramount Pictures
- Release date: December 23, 1923
- Running time: 70 minutes
- Country: United States
- Language: Silent (English intertitles)

Big Brother is a 1923 American silent drama film directed by Allan Dwan and written by Rex Beach and Paul Sloane. The film stars Tom Moore, Edith Roberts, Raymond Hatton, Joe King, Mickey Bennett, Charles Henderson, and Paul Panzer. The film was released on December 23, 1923, by Paramount Pictures.

Big Brother was shot at the Astoria Studios with extensive location shooting around New York City. It was remade as a sound film in 1931 as Young Donovan's Kid.

== Plot ==
As described in a film magazine review, Jimmy Donovan, gang leader in the East Side of New York City, protects Midge Murray when the latter's brother is slain. Jim decides that he must reform and bring up Midge decently. However, a court takes possession of Midge away from him. Jim, disgusted, plans a raid but then abandons the idea. His gang commits a robbery, and Jim and his girlfriend Kitty are accused of it. Jim escapes, recovers the loot and custody of Midge, and wins back the affection of Kitty.

== Cast ==
- Tom Moore as Jimmy Donovan
- Edith Roberts as Kitty Costello
- Raymond Hatton as Cokey Joe Miller
- Joe King as Big Ben Murray
- Mickey Bennett as Midge Murray
- Charles Henderson as 'Father Dan' Marron
- Paul Panzer as Mike Navarro
- Neill Kelley as Monk Manelli
- William Black as Loman Duryea
- Martin Faust as Spike Doyle
- Milton Herman as Izzy
- Florence Ashbrooke as Mrs. Sheean
- Yvonne Hughes as Navarro's Girl
- Charles Hammond as Judge
- Jack Oakie (uncredited)

== Preservation ==
Big Brother is currently presumed lost. In February of 2021, the film was cited by the National Film Preservation Board on their Lost U.S. Silent Feature Films list.

== Bibliography ==
- Lombardi, Frederic (2013). Allan Dwan and the Rise and Decline of the Hollywood Studios. McFarland & Company . ISBN 978-0-7864-3485-5
