= Received Payment =

1922 silent film

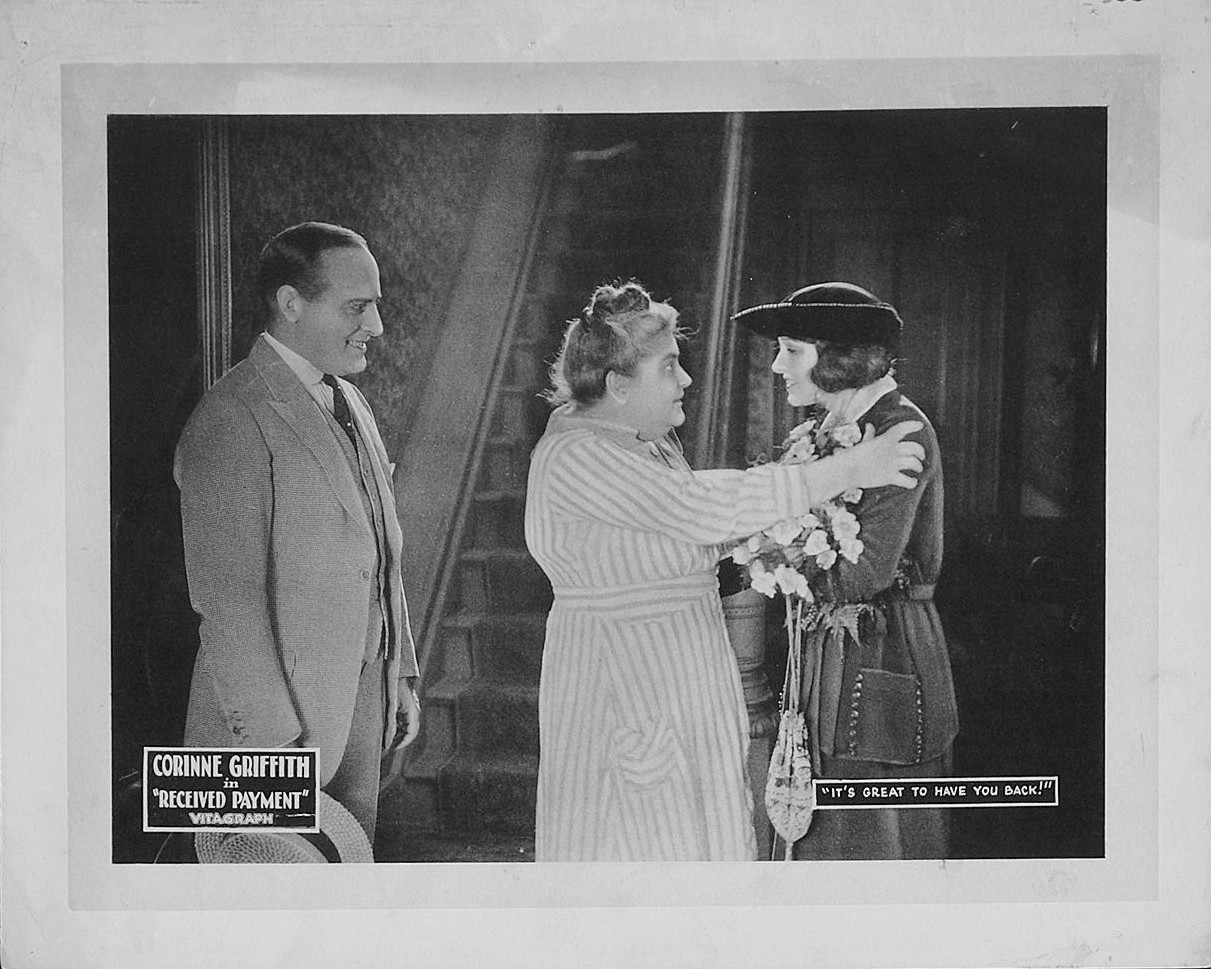
- Directed by: Charles Maigne
- Written by: William B. Courtney; John Lynch
- Produced by: Albert E. Smith
- Starring: Corinne Griffith; Kenneth Harlan; David Torrence
- Cinematography: Arthur Ross
- Production company: Vitagraph Company of America
- Distributed by: Vitagraph Company of America
- Release date: January 8, 1922
- Running time: 50 minutes
- Country: United States
- Languages: Silent; English intertitles

Received Payment is a 1922 American silent drama film directed by Charles Maigne and starring Corinne Griffith, Kenneth Harlan, and David Torrence.

== Plot ==
Andrew Ferris, is the butler to Daniel Milton, a wealthy man who, due to the death of his daughter, is being killed by his own mind. His guilty conscious preys on him due to his previous poor treatment of his daughter, and believes that her child is still alive. To ease his mind, Milton introduces his chorus girl daughter, Celia Hughes, as his employer's long lost granddaughter. Believing that Celia is his granddaughter, and her believing that Milton is her grandfather, she becomes the heiress to a mansion and a great fortune.

Celia discovers her real father burning letters which reveal that she is not Daniel Milton's granddaughter. She becomes fearful that she would lose his favor, and returns to the stage where she finds success. On opening night, Ferris is accidentally shot by a jilted secretary, and confesses duplicity to Milton before dying. The millionaire tells him that she will be taken care of all the same, as he has grown to love her as if she were his flesh and blood.

== Cast ==
- Corinne Griffith as Celia Hughes
- Kenneth Harlan as Cary Grant
- David Torrence as Daniel Milton
- William David as Dunbar
- Charles Hammond as Andrew Ferris
- Henry Sedley as Roger Dayne
- Regina Quinn as Felice Huxley
- Dorothy Walters as Mrs. Starr
- Dan Duffy as Starr

== Reception ==
The Film Daily's review was generally positive, finding the competent acting and direction enough to save the film from its story and "jumpy continuity." The reviewer praised Corinne Griffith's acting in particular, saying of her role "she succeeds in doing with charm and assurance."

Exhibitor's Herald gave a similar review, also saying that "The title of the film is a misnomer and doesn't do justice to a pleasing picture."

== Bibliography ==
- Munden, Kenneth White. The American Film Institute Catalog of Motion Pictures Produced in the United States, Part 1. University of California Press, 1997.
