= Torment (1924 film) =

1924 film directed by Maurice Tourneur

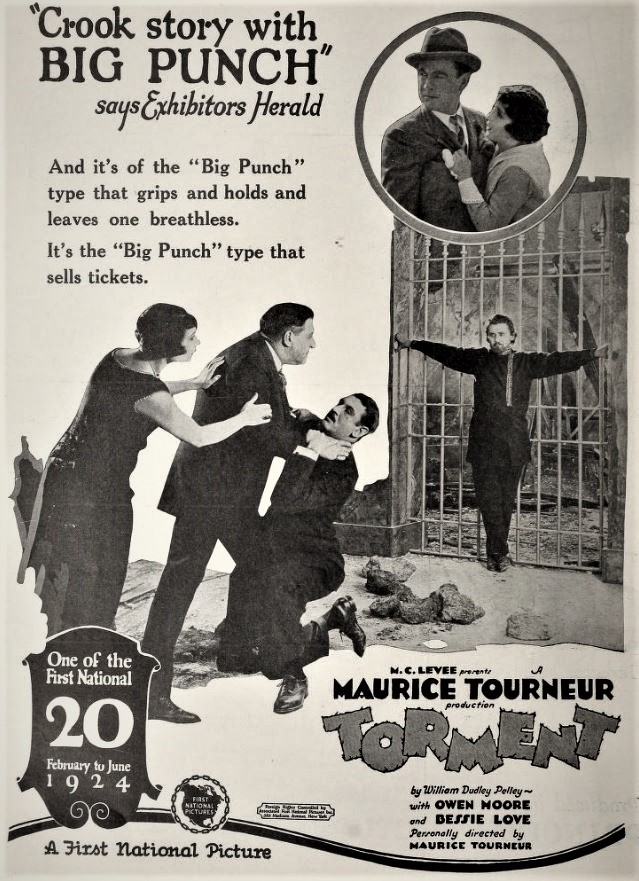
- Advertisement
- Directed by: Maurice Tourneur; Scott R. Beal (assistant director)
- Written by: Fred Myton (scenario); Marion Fairfax (intertitles)
- Based on: "Torment" (story) by William Dudley Pelley
- Produced by: Maurice Tourneur; M. C. Levee
- Starring: Bessie Love; Owen Moore; Jean Hersholt
- Cinematography: Arthur L. Todd
- Edited by: Frank Lawrence
- Production company: Maurice Tourneur Productions
- Distributed by: Associated First National
- Release date: February 11, 1924 (U.S.)
- Running time: 6 reels; 5,400 feet
- Country: United States
- Language: Silent (English intertitles)

Torment is a 1924 American silent crime drama film produced and directed by Maurice Tourneur and distributed by Associated First National. This film stars Bessie Love, Owen Moore, and Jean Hersholt. The film is based on a story by William Dudley Pelley with script by Fred Myton and titles by Marion Fairfax. It is a lost film.

== Plot ==
Count Boris Romanoff, a modern-day Robin Hood, has stolen the Russian crown jewels with the intent of selling them and giving the proceeds to the poor. However, a group of thieves led by Hansen learns of this plan, and plots to steal the jewels in Yokohama before they can be sold. On a ship to Japan, Hansen meets a maid named Marie, who convinces him to change his ways.

While in Yokohama, an earthquake levels the city, killing the count, and trapping Hansen, his fellow thieves, and Marie in a bank vault. Hansen and Marie fall in love, and Hansen vows to follow through with the count's wishes.

== Cast ==
- Bessie Love as Marie
- Owen Moore as Hansen
- Jean Hersholt as Count Boris Romanoff
- Joseph Kilgour as Flint
- Maude George as Mrs. Flint
- Morgan Wallace as Jules Carstock
- George Cooper as Chick Fogarty

== Production ==
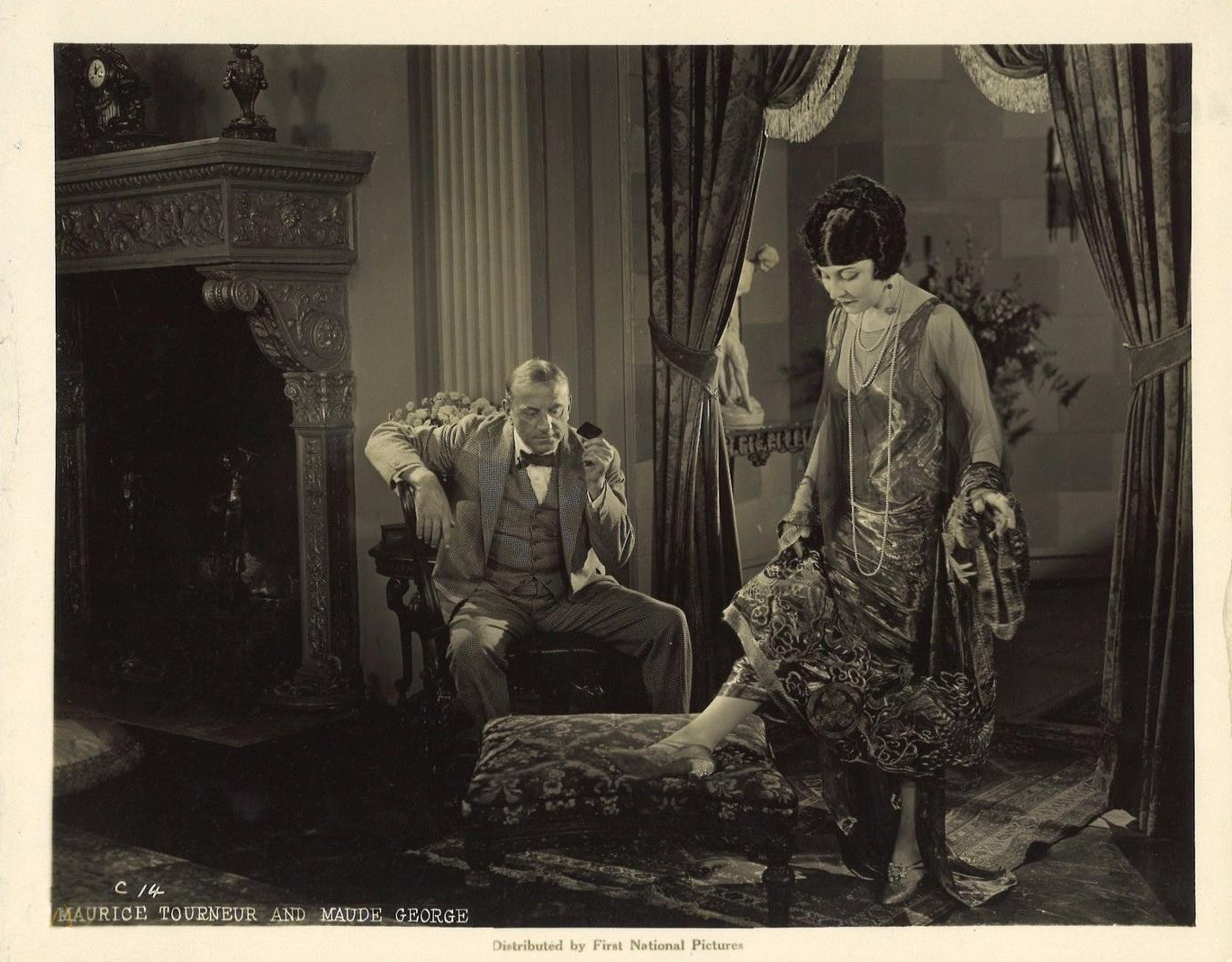
Publicity photograph

A production crew filmed scenes in Russia and Japan, as well as the United States, so that the scenes that took place in those locales would have an authenticity. The film also incorporated documentary footage of the 1923 Great Kantō earthquake.
