= Let's Go (1923 film) =

1923 American film

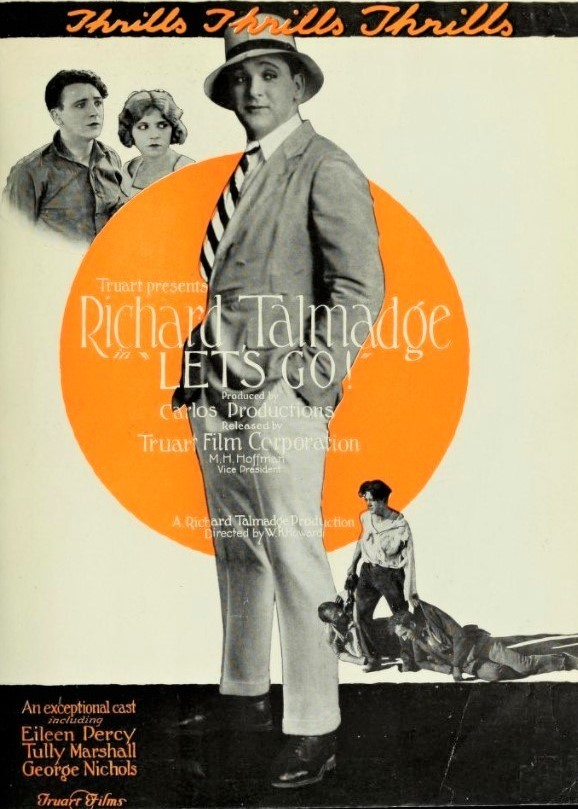
- Advertisement
- Directed by: William K. Howard
- Written by: Keene Thompson; Ralph Spence
- Produced by: Richard Talmadge; M.H. Hoffman
- Starring: Richard Talmadge; Eileen Percy; Tully Marshall
- Cinematography: W.E. Shepherd
- Production companies: Carlos Productions; Richard Talmadge Productions
- Distributed by: Truart Film Corporation
- Release date: November 1923
- Running time: 6 reels
- Country: United States
- Language: Silent (English intertitles)

Let's Go is a 1923 American silent action film directed by William K. Howard and starring Richard Talmadge, Eileen Percy, and Tully Marshall.

== Cast ==
- Richard Talmadge as Barry Macklin
- Eileen Percy as Lucy Frazer
- George Nichols as Jake Frazer
- Tully Marshall as Ezra Sprowl
- Bruce Gordon as Mio Sprowl
- Al Fremont as Ollie Banks
- Matthew Betz as 'Dip' McGurk
- Louis King as Luke Hazey
- Aggie Herring as Mrs. Hazey
- John Steppling as Andrew J. Macklin

== Preservation ==
Full movie

An incomplete print of Let's Go with one reel missing is held in the George Eastman Museum Motion Picture Collection.

== Bibliography ==
- Munden, Kenneth White. The American Film Institute Catalog of Motion Pictures Produced in the United States, Part 1. University of California Press, 1997. ISBN 0-5202-0969-9
