= The Golden Strain =

1925 film by Victor Schertzinger

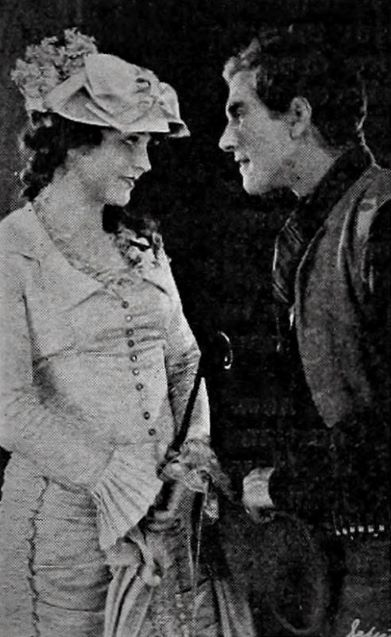
- Film still
- Directed by: Victor Schertzinger
- Screenplay by: Eve Unsell
- Based on: Thoroughbreds by Peter B. Kyne
- Starring: Hobart Bosworth; Kenneth Harlan; Madge Bellamy; Lawford Davidson; Ann Pennington; Frank Beal
- Cinematography: Glen MacWilliams
- Production company: Fox Film Corporation
- Distributed by: Fox Film Corporation
- Release date: December 27, 1925
- Running time: 60 minutes
- Country: United States
- Language: Silent (English intertitles)

The Golden Strain is a 1925 American silent Western film directed by Victor Schertzinger and written by Eve Unsell based upon a novel by Peter B. Kyne. The film stars Hobart Bosworth, Kenneth Harlan, Madge Bellamy, Lawford Davidson, Ann Pennington, and Frank Beal. The film was released on December 27, 1925, by Fox Film Corporation.

== Plot ==
As described in a film magazine review, Lieutenant Milt Mulford, on being commissioned, joins a United States Army post located near his father's ranch. He falls in love with Dixie, the daughter of Major Denniston. Because Gaynes, government agent, is cheating the American Indians out of supplies, the Apaches go on the warpath. Milt heads a squadron that is sent out after them. Fear seizes the officer at the opening of a skirmish, and he fails to lead his men, and he is temporarily disgraced. Later, he redeems himself and regains command, and wins the affection of Dixie.

== Cast ==
- Hobart Bosworth as Maj. Milton Mulford
- Kenneth Harlan as Milt Mulford Jr.
- Madge Bellamy as Dixie Denniston
- Lawford Davidson as Maj. Gaynes
- Ann Pennington as Lucy Sulter
- Frank Beal as Maj. Denniston
- Frankie Lee as Milt, as a boy
- Robert Frazer as Sergeant
- Oscar Smith as Snowball
- George Reed as Butler
- Grace Morse as Clara
- Frank McGlynn Jr. as Zeb
- Larry Fisher as Captain Powell
- Lola Mackey as Arabella
- Coy Watson Jr. as Zeb, as a boy

== Preservation ==
A complete print of The Golden Strain is in the collection of the Museum of Modern Art.
