= Cyril Chadwick =

English actor

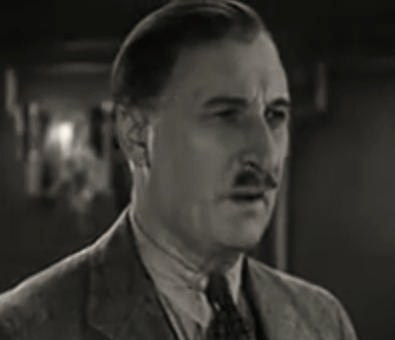
- Still from Sensation Hunters (1933)
- Born: 11 June 1879; Kensington, London, England
- Died: 3 November 1955 (aged 76); Paddington, Metropolitan Borough of Paddington, London, England
- Occupation: Actor
- Years active: 1913–1938

Cyril Chadwick (11 June 1879 – 3 November 1955) was an English actor of the silent era. He appeared in 70 films between 1913 and 1938. He was born in Kensington, London.

== Partial filmography ==
- Doc (1914) - Eastman
- Mrs. Black Is Back (1914) - Bramley Bush
- Marrying Money (1915) - Archie Vandeveer
- The Smugglers (1916) - Brompton
- Bab's Matinee Idol (1917) - Hon. Page Beresford
- Mrs. Dane's Defense (1918) - James Risbee
- The Richest Girl (1918) - Minor Role
- On the Quiet (1918) - Duke of Carbondale
- Out Yonder (1919) - Reggie Hughes
- His Wife's Money (1920) - James Cardwell
- Clothes (1920) - Arnold West
- The Misleading Lady (1920) - Tracey
- Three Live Ghosts (1922) - Spoofy
- Till We Meet Again (1922) - Gang Member
- Women Men Marry (1922) - Lord Brooks Fitzroy
- Thirty Days (1922) - Huntley Palmer
- The Strangers' Banquet (1922) - Bond
- The Christian (1923) - Lord Robert Ure
- Brass (1923) - Roy North
- Little Church Around the Corner (1923) - Mark Hanford
- Slander the Woman (1923) - Monsieur Lemond
- The Rustle of Silk (1923) - Paul Chalfon
- Don't Marry for Money (1923) - Crane Martin
- The Social Code (1923) - Colby Dickinson
- Happiness (1924) - Philip Chandos
- The Storm Daughter (1924) - The Duke
- The Heart Buster (1924) - Edward Gordon
- The Man Who Came Back (1924) - Captain Trevelan
- The Iron Horse (1924) - Jesson
- Peter Pan (1924) - Mr. Darling
- Forty Winks (1925) - Gasper Le Sage
- The Hunted Woman (1925) - Culver Rann
- His Supreme Moment (1925) - Harry Avon
- Thank You (1925) - Mr. Jones
- Sporting Life (1925) - Lord Phillips Wainwright
- The Best Bad Man (1925) - Frank Dunlap
- The Ship of Souls (1925) - Churchill
- Hold That Lion (1926) - H. Horace Smythe
- Gigolo (1926) - Dr. Gerald Blagden
- Is Zat So? (1927) - Robert Parker
- Foreign Devils (1927) - Lord Vivien Cholmondely
- The Actress (1928) - Capt. de Foenix
- The Mating Call (1928) - Captain Anderson
- Excess Baggage (1928) - Crammon
- The Black Watch (1929) - Maj. Twynes
- The Last of Mrs. Cheyney (1929) - Willie Wynton
- The Thirteenth Chair (1929) - Brandon Trent
- Temple Tower (1930) - Peter Darrell
- The Lady of Scandal (1930) - Sir Reginald Whelby
- Once a Gentleman (1930) - Jarvis
- Sensation Hunters (1933) - Upson
- The Big Bluff (1933)
- Tea Leaves in the Wind (1938)
