= Butter Fingers =

1925 film

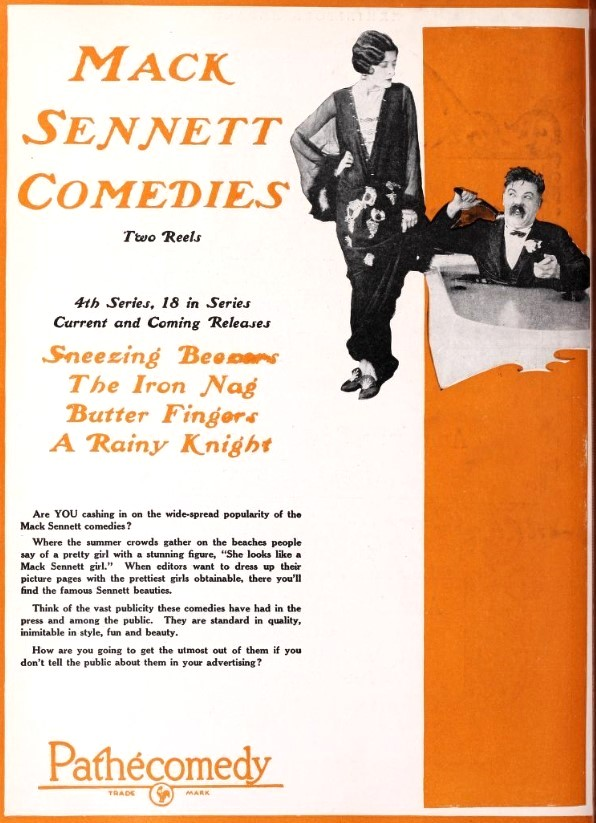
- Advertisement with still from the film
- Directed by: Del Lord
- Written by: Felix Adler (titles); Al Giebler (titles); Jefferson Moffitt (writer)
- Produced by: Mack Sennett
- Starring: Billy Bevan
- Cinematography: George Spear; George Unholz
- Edited by: William Hornbeck
- Production company: Mack Sennett Comedies
- Distributed by: Pathé Exchange
- Release date: August 30, 1925
- Running time: 16 minutes
- Country: United States
- Language: Silent (English intertitles)

Butter Fingers is a 1925 American silent film sports comedy film directed by Del Lord starring Billy Bevan.

== Cast ==
- Billy Bevan as Nick, the Star Pitcher
- Andy Clyde as Hoke Perkins
- Ruth Taylor as Nellie Perkins
- Kewpie Morgan as Daisy's Husband
- Madeline Hurlock as Daisy Bender
- George Harris as Baseball Player
- Barney Hellum as Cart Driver
- Betty Bird as Dancing Girl
- Bobby Dunn as Baseball Player
- Thelma Hill as Dancing Girl
- Natalie Kingston as Dancing Girl
- Roger Moore as Baseball Player
- Jack Murphy as Baseball Player
- Art Rowlands as Hotel Guest
- Leo Sulky as Umpire / Baseball Player
