= Butterfinger (Canadian band) =

Canadian alt-rock band formed 2001

- Origin: Saskatoon, Saskatchewan, Canada
- Genres: Alternative rock
- Years active: 2001–2004
- Members: Dean Person; Tyler Penny; John Sanche; Damon Tupper

Butterfinger was a Saskatchewan-based Canadian alternative rock band which released one independently recorded studio album.

Their song Breathe won several awards including the national songwriting competition in conjunction with Canadian Music Week in 2001. Its success inspired the band to work on a full-length album, directed by Producer, Mixer, and Engineer Jared Kuemper.

Butterfinger was nominated for "Outstanding Rock Recording" at the Western Canadian Music Awards in 2003.

In November 2003, Butterfinger was awarded a VideoFACT grant to shoot a music video for the song Do You Feel?. They were one of only 40 to receive the grant out of the 284 submissions. The video was produced by a Toronto film company called Firewatch Films.

The band has not released any new music since 2004 (although it played the half-time show at the 2017 Saskatchewan Rush home opener game). Sanche left the music industry. Tupper has played in several bands including Hung Jury, Lisa Moen, and Tyler Lewis. Tyler Penny formed the band Penny Reign. Dean Person has had success as a singer/songwriter/guitarist.

== Members ==
- Dean Person - Lead Guitar, Vocals
- Tyler Penny - Lead Vocals, Guitar
- John Sanche - Bass, Vocals
- Damon Tupper - Drums, Vocals
