= Charles Hammond (Australian cricketer) =

Australian cricketer and actor (1868–1955)

Personal information
- Full name: Charles Pitt Hammond
- Born: 31 August 1868; Hobart, Tasmania, Australia
- Died: 25 September 1955 (aged 87); Hollywood, California, United States

Domestic team information
- Years: Team
- 1898/99–1899/1900: Tasmania

Career statistics
Competition	First-class
Matches	2
Runs scored	24
Batting average	6.00
100s/50s	0/0
Top score	22
Balls bowled	55
Wickets	0
Bowling average	–
5 wickets in innings	–
10 wickets in match	–
Best bowling	–
Catches/stumpings	0/–
- Source: Cricinfo, 30 September 2024

Charles Pitt Hammond (31 August 1868 – 25 September 1955) was an Australian cricketer and actor. He played two first-class matches for Tasmania in the late 1890s, before moving to the United States.

While working at the Launceston Stock Exchange in the 1890s, Hammond also played cricket and took part in amateur theatrical productions. He was a regular player for the North of Tasmania in the matches against South of Tasmania from 1886 to 1900, and played for Tasmania in the 1898–99 and 1899–1900 seasons.

In 1901 Hammond moved to the United States, where he made a living as a professional actor, first on the stage in New York, then in Hollywood movies. His film parts included prominent roles in Women Men Marry (1922), Received Payment (1922) and Big Brother (1923).

Hammond married Josephine Collins of Launceston in Cheltenham, England, in July 1909. They had one child, a son, who died in childhood.
