= Galloping Bungalows =

1991 book by David A. Thornburg

Galloping Bungalows: The Rise and Demise of the American House Trailer
- Author: David A. Thornburg
- Language: English
- Subject: Motorhome
- Genre: Non-fiction
- Publisher: Archon
- Publication date: 1991
- Publication place: United States
- ISBN: 978-0208022776

Galloping Bungalows: The Rise and Demise of the American House Trailer (Archon 1991 ISBN 978-0208022776) is a book by David A. Thornburg that discusses Americans taking to homes on wheels. It combines his own experiences with two years of research.
