= Santa Barbara County Courthouse =

- U.S. National Register of Historic Places
- U.S. National Historic Landmark
- California Historical Landmark
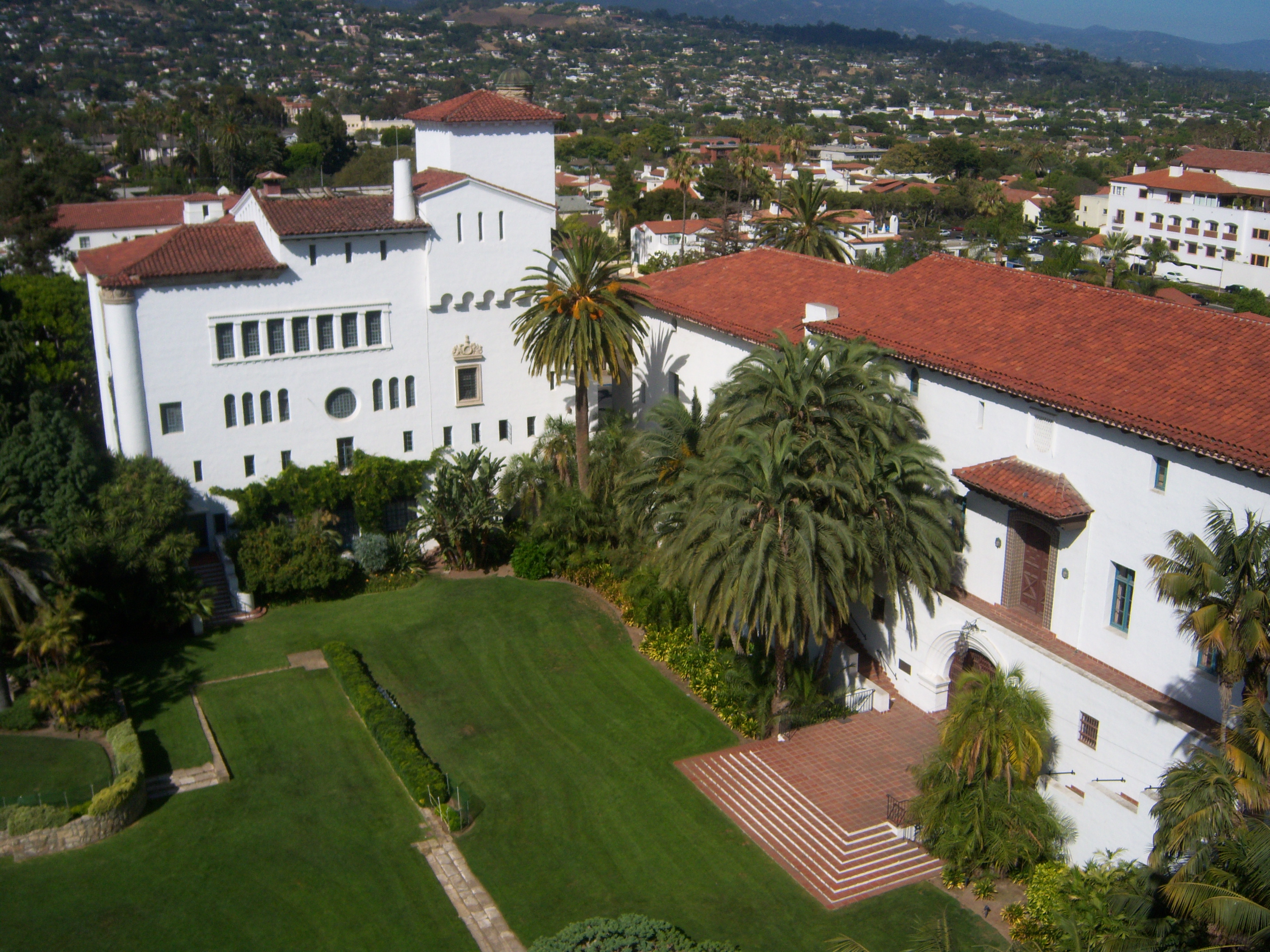
- Santa Barbara County Courthouse, exterior view from the clock tower, showing the Sunken Garden

- Location within California Location within the United States
- Location: Santa Barbara, California
- Coordinates: 34°25′27.66″N 119°42′8.86″W
- Area: 4.65 acres (1.88 ha)
- Built: 1926
- Architect: William Mooser
- Architectural style: Spanish Colonial Revival
- NRHP reference No.: 81000177
- CHISL No.: 1037
- Added to NRHP: January 23, 1981

The Santa Barbara County Courthouse is the seat of the Santa Barbara County Superior Court and a well-known example of Spanish Colonial Revival architecture and is located in Santa Barbara, Santa Barbara County, California. Started in 1926 and completed in 1929, the Courthouse originally served as Santa Barbara County’s superior courthouse, jail, and administrative office. The Courthouse was included on the National Register of Historic Places in 1981, was made a City of Santa Barbara Historic Landmark in 1982, a California Historical Landmark in 2004, and a National Historic Landmark in 2005. Over the years, most County administrative offices were relocated to other County buildings. The current Courthouse houses six County Superior Court rooms, the Mural Room (formerly the Supervisors Assembly Room), the County Hall of Records, the County Public Defender's Office, offices of the County General Services Department, and the McMahon Law Library. The Courthouse is open to the public and is a popular site for community gatherings and weddings. Architect Charles Willard Moore called it the "grandest Spanish Colonial Revival structure ever built," and the prime example of Santa Barbara's adoption of Spanish Colonial as its civic style.

== Early courthouse history ==
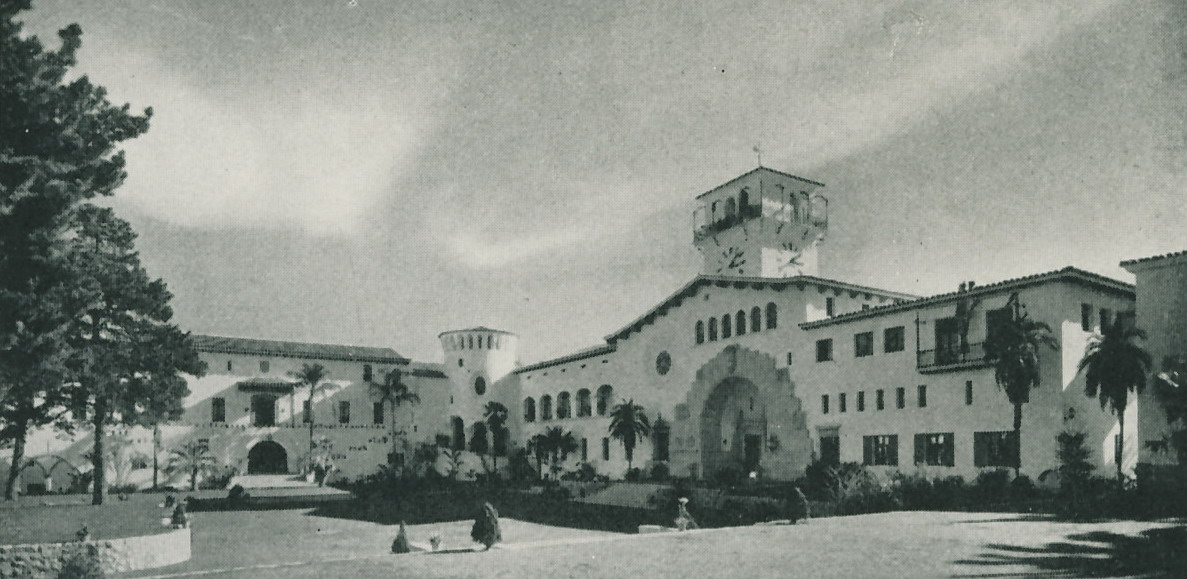
Santa Barbara County Courthouse, 1929

Santa Barbara County was one of the 27 original counties of California and was formed in 1850 when California became the 31st state. The County in 1855 purchased the original Courthouse site on which stood a mercantile store called Kays Adobe. Kays Adobe served the County as a courthouse and administrative building until it was replaced around the perimeter of the same block in 1872 with a Greek Revival style building. The County continued to grow, and in 1900 County officials began consideration of a new courthouse. During this period, Spanish Colonial Revival architecture was gaining popularity in California, and in 1919, the County held an architectural competition to replace the Greek Revival courthouse. Santa Barbara was struck by an earthquake in 1925 that caused loss of life and property damage. The 1872 Greek Revival courthouse and attendant buildings were damaged. In 1926, the County commenced construction of the new Courthouse on the location of the 1872 courthouse. The new Courthouse (including approximately 148,000 square feet of work space) was completed in March 1929 and dedicated on August 14, 1929. The Courthouse included two courtrooms, the County Board of Supervisors Assembly Room, jury assembly rooms, offices for the County Auditor, the Office of the County Treasury/Tax Collector, the Superintendent of Schools, a Sheriff's Department Office, the County jail, the County Hall of Records and other administrative offices.

== Courthouse Building ==
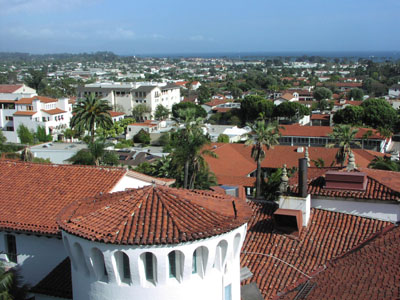
Red tile roofs in Santa Barbara. Circular tower at center is the old County Jail.

=== Courtrooms ===
When built in 1929, the courthouse contained two courtrooms and various county administrative offices. Over the years, as the county’s administration needs grew, county offices relocated to other nearby county buildings. In 1960, the Santa Barbara County Board of Supervisors Assembly Room was relocated and the courthouse was remodeled to add additional courtrooms. The courthouse now holds six courtrooms.

=== Jail ===
The 1929 jail was originally built to house 140 prisoners. The top floor contains two solitary confinement cells. The fourth floor housed male prisoners. The third floor housed female prisoners. The second floor served as an apartment for the County’s jailers and their families. The first floor housed offices of the Santa Barbara County Sheriff. The jail cells include tool proof bars and are constructed similar to the Alcatraz Federal Penitentiary in San Francisco, California. The County built new jail facilities in Santa Barbara in 1971 and the County’s prisoners were relocated. The Courthouse jail is unrestored and houses a few County administrative offices.

=== Hall of Records ===
The County Hall of Records houses the County Clerk-Recorder’s office and sits at the north-west corner of the Courthouse building. It is the repository for County real estate, marriage and related records. Its architectural features include a 13’ double door featuring repousse copper plates depicting allegorical scenes of California history. The Hall of Records also includes an atrium and a 45’ skylight.

=== Geothermal Field ===
Beneath the lawn on the North-Western corner of the Courthouse lies a geothermal field. Constructed in 2003, the geothermal field provides a sustainable source of energy, powering the building's heating and cooling systems. The lawn was drilled with 32 holes, 5 and 1/4 inches in diameter, 18 feet apart bored to a depth of 400 feet where the earth has a constant temperature of 69 to 70 degrees. Circulating water in pipes is heated or cooled to that constant temperature. While unseen, this geothermal field is vital to the Courthouse's operation, showcasing innovation and environmental responsibility within a historical landmark.

=== Santa Barbara County Public Defender ===
The courthouse is the home to the County Public Defender’s Office. The County Public Defender's Office is a government agency that provides legal representation to adults and juveniles who are accused of crimes in the County and cannot afford an attorney.

=== Restoration ===
The Santa Barbara County Courthouse has undergone several restoration projects including the 2022 restoration effort on the buildings roof and exterior.

== Architecture ==
The Panama–California Exposition of 1915 in San Diego introduced Spanish Colonial Revival architecture to the United States. In 1925, the County’s Board of Supervisors hired the William Mooser Company of San Francisco to design and build the Courthouse in a Spanish-Andalusian castle style. With its red tiled roofs, white stucco walls and various balconies, the Courthouse could be a castle in Andalusia. Examples of the Courthouse’s Andalusian castle motif are found in the main staircase. The first example is the presence of a small balcony called a “Hoard”, which would have been used for defensive purposes. Castle defenders would have stood on the Hoard and used the attendant “Lancet” windows to direct weapons fire down upon potential enemies. A third example of Andelusian castle architecture is found in the Courthouse’s rotunda staircase. The staircase is designed as a defensive element, providing for the ascension and descension of the stairs by castle defenders in a manner that facilitates a defensive resistance to ascending enemies.

== Interior ==
The courthouse’s interior features numerous Spanish Colonial Revival architectural elements. The floors feature TerraCotta tiles manufactured in Lincoln, California by Gladding, McBean and Company and the wall tiles were created by renowned Tunisian ceramic artist Jacob Chemla. The Courthouse includes a number of lamps varying in size and chandeliers custom made in the United States. Prominent Courthouse art includes “Landing of Cabrillo” by Dan Sayer Groesbeck and a series of paintings by Theodore Van Cina including “The Burial of Governor Jose Figueroa” and “The Fandango”.

=== Mural Room ===
The courthouse’s most prominent feature is the former Supervisor’s Assembly Room, now referred to as the Mural Room. The Mural Room walls were painted by book illustrator and Hollywood set and costume designer Dan Sayer Groesbeck. At over 4,200 square feet in size, the Mural Room took Groesbeck and his team months to complete. The mural features prominent scenes from Santa Barbara’s history including the landing of Portuguese explorer Juan Rodriguez Cabrillo in 1542 and the construction of the Mission Santa Barbara. The Mural Room’s ceiling, as well as a majority of the Courthouse’s ceilings, were painted by Italian artist Giovanni Smeraldi.

=== Relief Map ===
The courthouse’s first floor features a 10 x 12 foot relief map of Santa Barbara County. Created as a Works Progress Administration project in 1934, it depicts the Los Padres National Forest lands within six counties, and was based on US Forest Service and US Geological Survey maps of the area and was intended to be used in support of fighting forest fires. Modeling was done by the Civilian Conservation Corps and it was built by U.S. Forest Service engineers. First displayed at the California Pacific International Exhibition in San Diego in 1935, the map was installed in the Santa Barbara County Courthouse in 1936.

== Exterior ==
The exterior features red tile roofs and white stucco walls consistent with the Spanish Colonial Revival style. The building’s main entrance areas, as well as side entrances and the entrance to the County Hall of Records, feature dramatic stone facades with sandstone quarried from Santa Barbara County’s Refugio Canyon. Giovanni Antolini was the master stonecutter and mason who oversaw the stonework. The exterior also demonstrates the lancet windows, barred windows and balconies so familiar in Spanish Colonial Revival architecture. The rear exit of the Courthouse on the old jail side includes a dramatic 21 foot tall castle iron lattice gate (or yett). The gate is decorative and not used for Courthouse security and includes a “wicket” door. The jail also features a turret located high on the Courthouse’s North-East side. The turret is inaccessible and an entirely decorative architectural element.

=== Great Arch and the Spirit of the Ocean ===
The courthouse great arch is a triumphal arch and is the Courthouse main entrance. The arch is 39 feet tall. It is topped by a pediment that features relief sculptures including the Scales of Justice. The arch is flanked by two towers, each of which is topped by a copper cupola. The arch is made of sandstone and is decorated with sculptures of cherubs and other figures. The Spirit of the Ocean is a fountain located in front of the Courthouse to the left of the arch and is a 12-foot-tall depiction of a woman and man emerging from the ocean. The fountain is surrounded by a decorative pool of water. The Great Arch and sculpture was created by Italian artist Ettore Cadorin. The Spirit of the Ocean was restored in 2010 and the Great Arch was restored in 2023.

=== Courthouse Grounds/Sunken Gardens ===
The courthouse grounds feature the Sunken Garden, a prominent Santa Barbara park used year round for special events, Old Spanish Days performances and weddings. The garden is approximately 1.5 acres in size and is home to over 200 species of plants, including palm trees, citrus trees, and succulents. It features stone elements that roughly approximate the foundation of the Greek Revival courthouse that stood in this location up until 1925.

The courthouse is a popular location for weddings of all sizes. California Attorney General, Senator and United States Vice President Kamala Harris married Doug Emhoff at the Courthouse in 2014. Khloé Kardashian and Blink-182 drummer Travis Barker were married at the Courthouse in 2022.

=== Clock Tower and Bisno Schall Clock Gallery ===
The courthouse prominently features a four-story clock tower next to the Great Arch which includes a rare, fully-operational four sided Seth Thomas clock. The clock tower's top floor includes an observation deck affording guests a 360-degree view of downtown Santa Barbara, the surrounding mountains, and the Pacific Ocean. The third floor features the Seth Thomas clock. The interior of the tower houses the Bisno Schall Clock Gallery. The Clock Gallery includes the clock mechanism, a mural depicting highlights from the history of timekeeping, and modern electronics used to monitor the clock. The restoration of the clock and the clock tower gallery was completed in 2012. Visitors may take elevators to the summit of the 85 ft (26 m) "El Mirador" clock tower, which has labeled photographs that show what the viewer is looking at in all directions.

== Santa Barbara County Courthouse Docent Council ==
The Santa Barbara County Courthouse Docent Council is a volunteer organization that offers daily tours and hosts an information booth located on the Courthouse’s first floor. Courthouse Docents receive extensive training in the Courthouse history and lore. In addition to offering tours, the Courthouse Docents also offer private tours to community groups, businesses, schools and other groups such as cruise ship patrons.

The Courthouse Docents began offering Courthouse tours on May 1, 1974. In 1981, the Santa Barbara County Board of Supervisors designated the Docent Council as the official building host. On May 1, 2024, the Courthouse Docents celebrated their 50th anniversary with a public ceremony held in the Courthouse's Mural Room.

== Courthouse Legacy Foundation ==
The Santa Barbara County Courthouse Legacy Foundation is a non-profit organization founded in 1989 to preserve and restore the Courthouse. The foundation raises funds to support Courthouse maintenance and restoration, and it also offers educational programs about the Courthouse and its history. In recent years, the foundation has completed several projects to restore the Courthouse, including the conservation and restoration of the Great Arch.

== Gallery ==
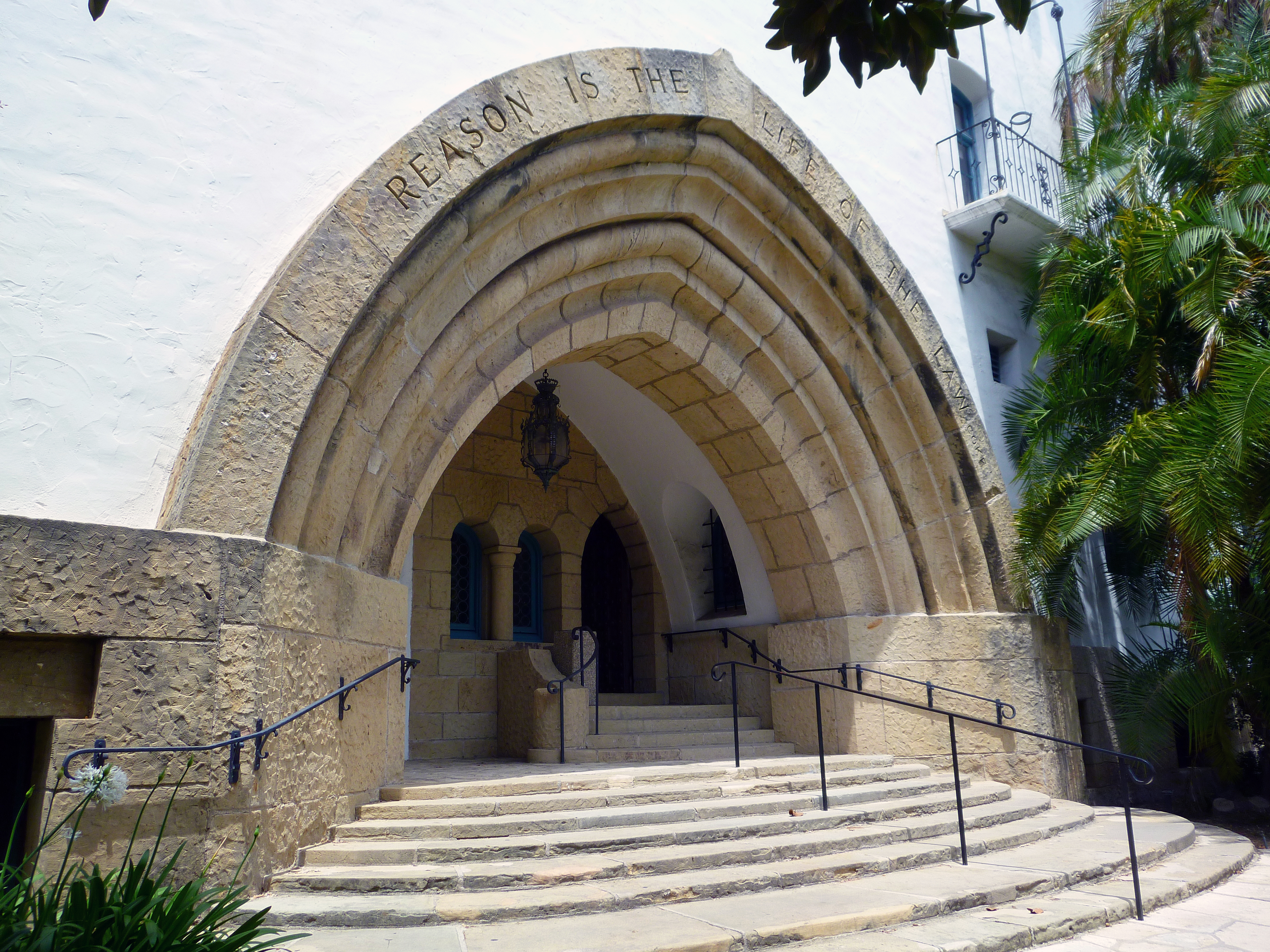
"Reason is the Life of the Law"

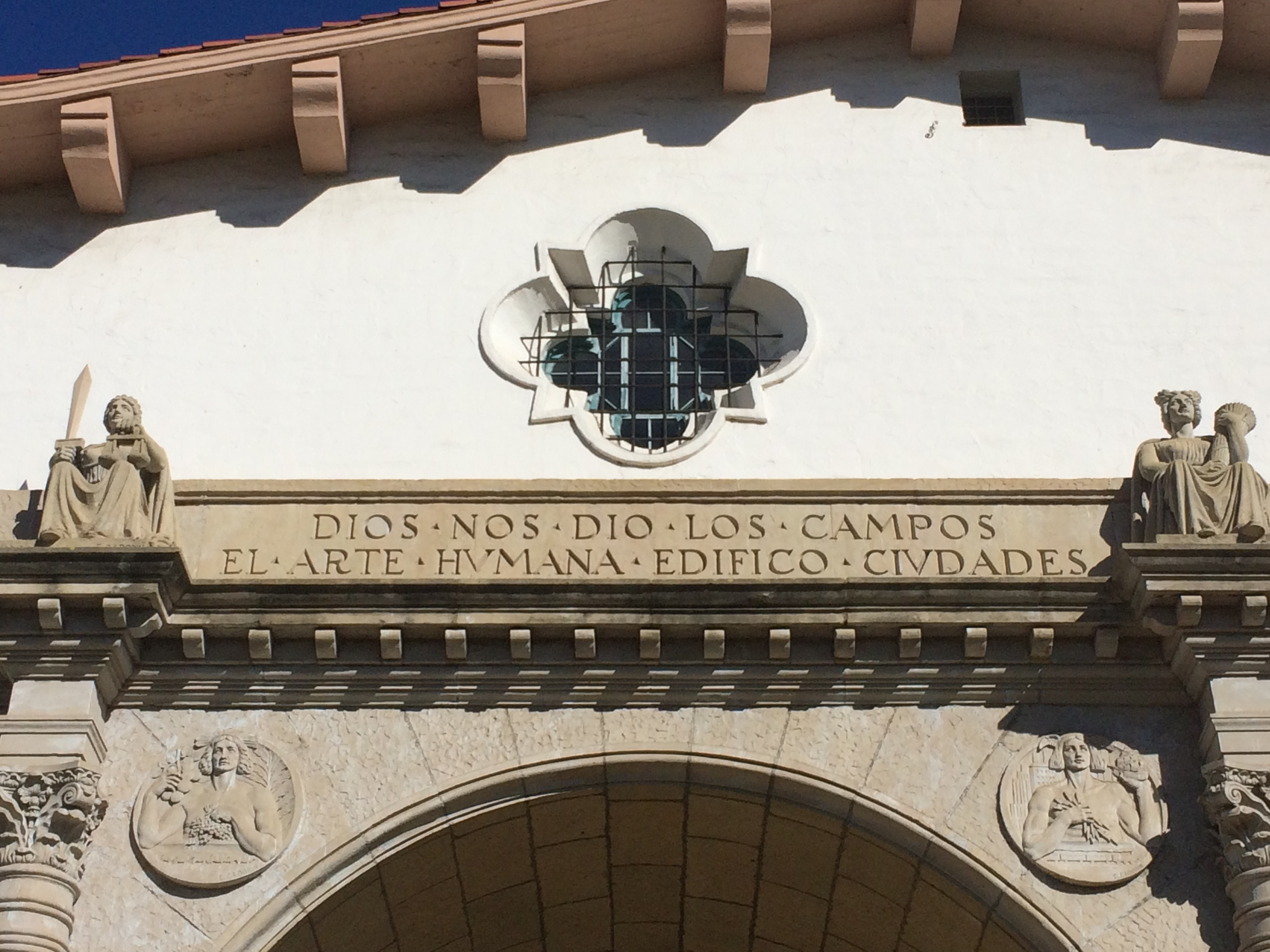
Inscription above the main entrance: "Dios nos dio los campos. El arte humana edificó ciudades." This translates to "God gave us the fields. Human art built cities."

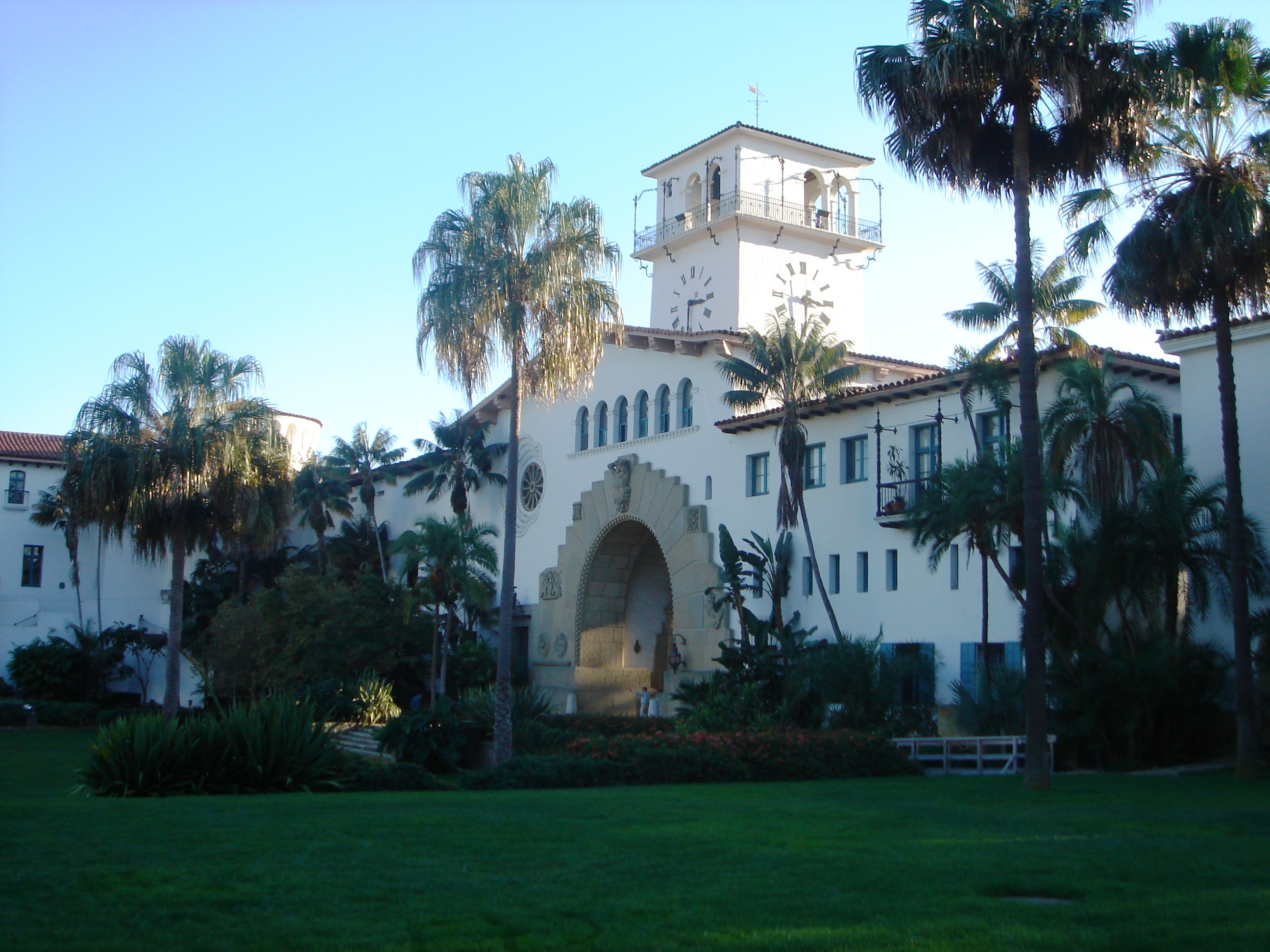
Sunken Garden and clock tower

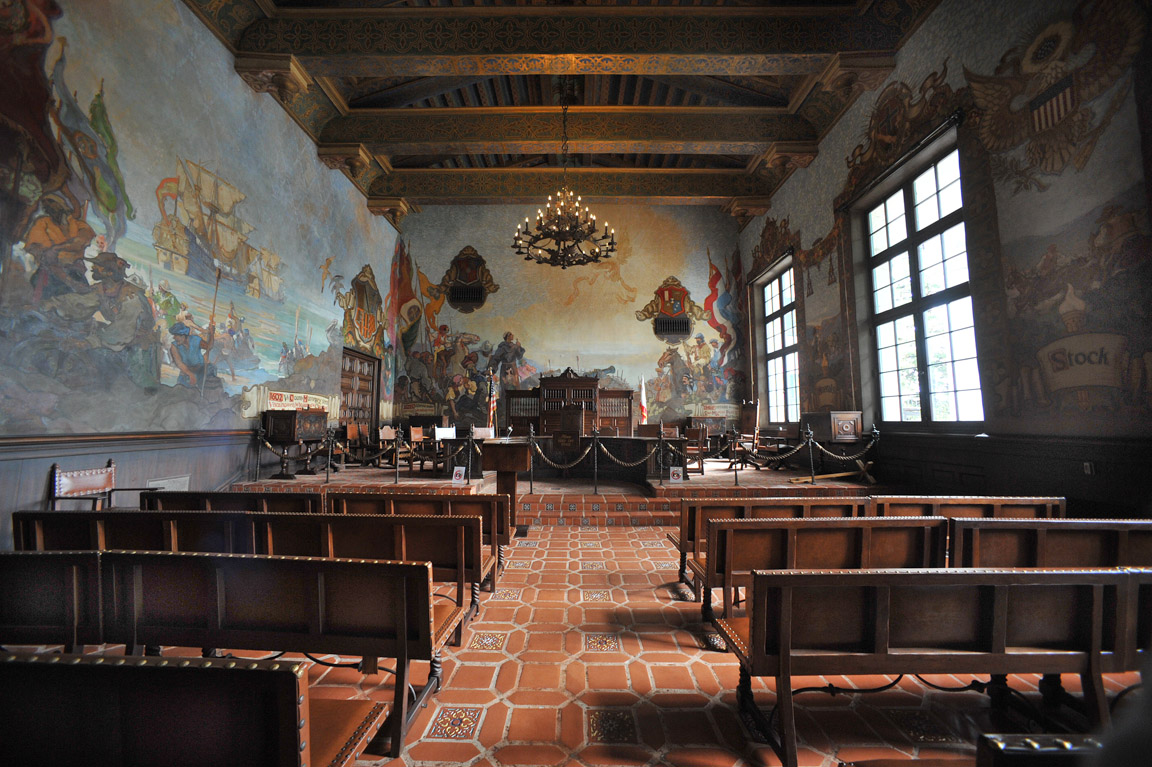
Interior view of the Mural Room

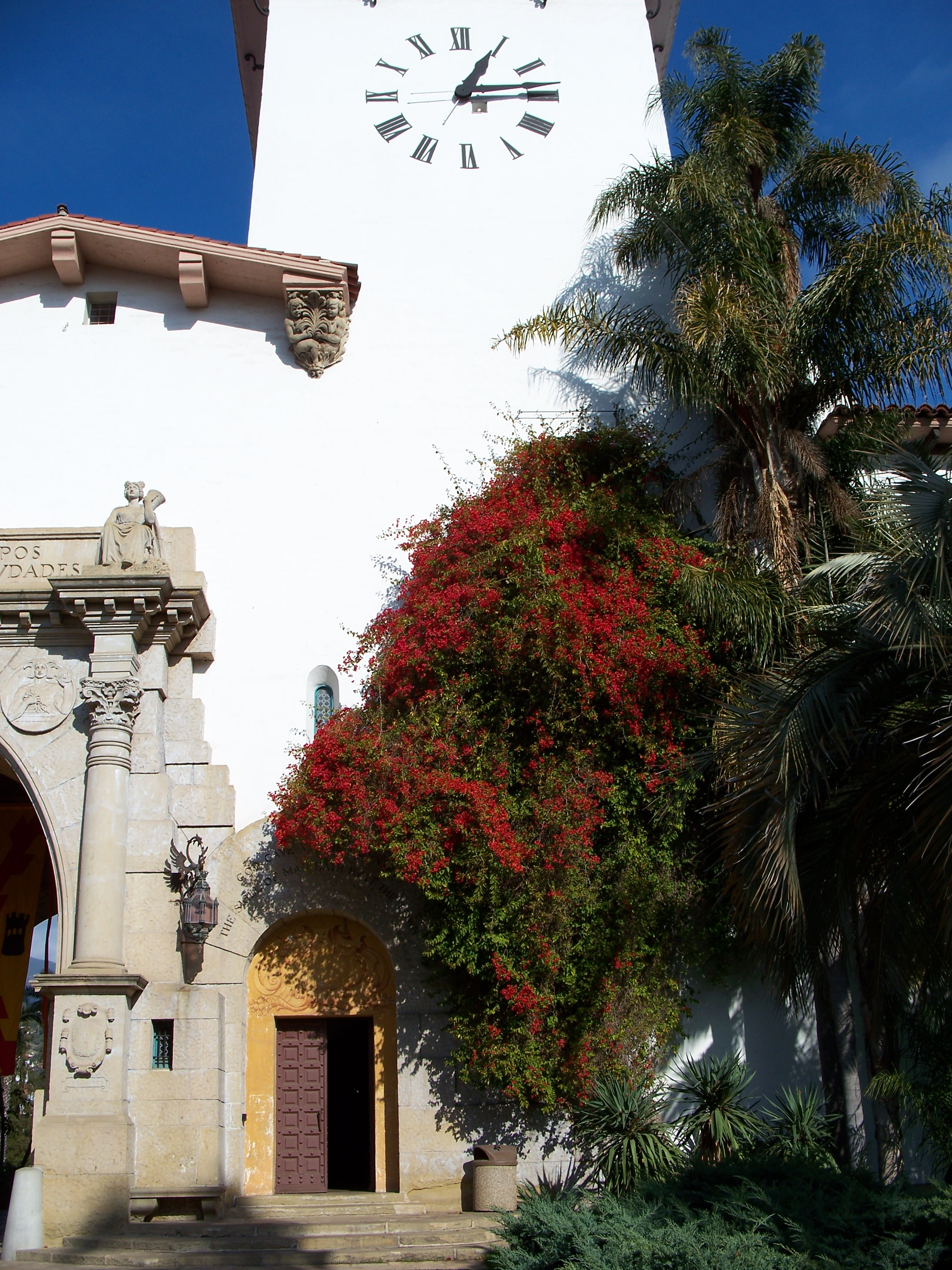
Main entrance and clock tower

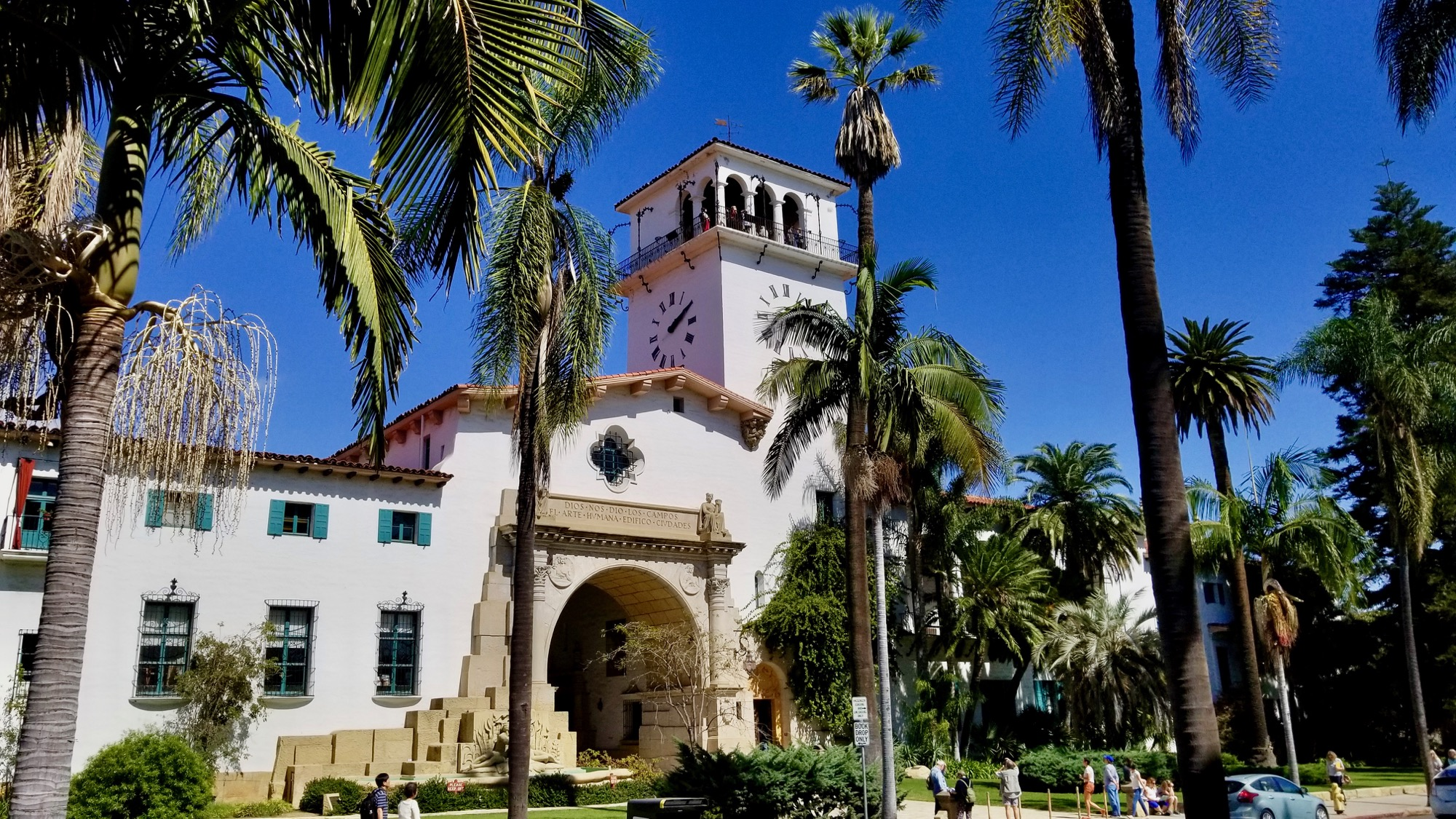
Front view of the courthouse

== See also ==
- History of Santa Barbara, California
- California Historical Landmarks in Santa Barbara County, California
