= Judeo-Tunisian Arabic =

Variety of Tunisian Arabic

- Native to: Beit Shemesh, Jerusalem District, Israel; Houmt Souk, Djerba, Tunisia; Tunis, Tunisia; Gabes, Tunisia
- Native speakers: 11,000 (2011–2018)
- Language family: Afro-Asiatic: Semitic; Central Semitic; South Central Semitic; Arabic; Maghrebi Arabic; Pre-Hilalian Arabic; Judeo-Tunisian Arabic
- Writing system: Arabic script Hebrew alphabet

Language codes
- ISO 639-3: (ajt subsumed in aeb Tunisian Arabic)
- Glottolog: jude1263
- ELP: Judeo-Tunisian Arabic

Judeo-Tunisian Arabic, also known as Judeo-Tunisian, is a variety of Tunisian Arabic mainly spoken by Jews living or formerly living in Tunisia. Speakers are older adults, and the younger generation has only a passive knowledge of the language.

The vast majority of Tunisian Jews have relocated to Israel and have shifted to Hebrew as their home language. Those in France typically use French as their primary language, while the few in Tunisia tend to use either French or Tunisian Arabic in their everyday lives.

Judeo-Tunisian Arabic is one of the Judeo-Arabic languages, Arabic dialects spoken by Jews living or formerly living in the Arab world.

== History ==
=== Before 1901 ===
A Jewish community existed in what is today Tunisia even before Roman rule in Africa. After the Muslim conquest of the Maghreb, this community began to use Arabic for their daily communication. They had adopted the pre-Hilalian dialect of Tunisian Arabic as their own dialect. As Jewish communities tend to be close-knit and isolated from the other ethnic and religious communities of their countries, their dialect spread to their coreligionists all over the country and was not in contact with the languages of the communities that invaded Tunisia in the Middle Ages. The primary language contact on Judeo-Tunisian Arabic came from the languages of Jewish communities that fled to Tunisia as a result of persecution, like the Judaeo-Spanish-speaking Sephardic Jews This explains why Judeo-Tunisian Arabic lacks influence from the dialects of the Banu Hilal and Banu Sulaym, and has developed several phonological and lexical particularities that distinguish it from Tunisian Arabic. This also explains why Judeo-Tunisian words are generally less removed from their etymological origin than Tunisian words.

The most famous author in Judeo-Arabic is Nissim ben Jacob (990–1062). An influential rabbinical personality of his time, Nissim of Kairouan wrote a collection of folks stories intended for moral encouragement, at the request of his father-in-law on the loss of his son. Nissim wrote "An Elegant Compilation concerning Relief after Adversity" (Al-Faraj ba‘d al-shidda) first in an elevated Judeo-Arabic style following Sa‘adia Gaon's writing conventions and later translated the work into Mishnaic Hebrew.

The first Judeo-Arabic printing house opened in Tunis in 1860. In 1861, the Tunisian fundamental Pact of 1857 was translated and printed in Judeo-Arabic before its translation into Hebrew in 1862).

=== After 1901 ===
In 1901, Judeo-Tunisian became one of the main spoken Arabic dialects of Tunisia, with thousands of speakers. Linguists noted its uniqueness and studied it. Among the people studying Judeo-Tunisian Arabic, Daniel Hagege listed numerous Judeo-Tunisian Arabic newspapers from the early 1900s in his essay The Circulation of Tunisian Judeo-Arabic Books. In 1903, David Aydan printed in Judeo-Arabic "Vidu-i bel arbi", a translation of the ritual text recited by the community on Yom Kippur eve. It was printed in Djerba, unlike the many Hebrew-language Tunisian Jewish texts printed in Livorno, Italy. Educated leaders within the Tunisian Jewish community, like the ceramic merchant Jacob Chemla, translated several works into Judeo-Tunisian, including The Count of Monte Cristo.

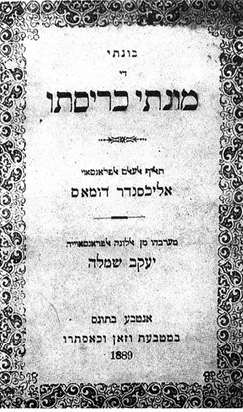
The first page of The Count of Monte Cristo in Judeo-Tunisian Arabic

It has significantly declined since 1948 due to the creation of Israel and the subsequent 1948 Arab–Israeli War. Tunisian Jews either chose to leave or were forced to leave and emigrate to France or Israel. Today, the language is nlybspoken y tsall communities in Tunis, Gabes and Djerba,; most communities that have left Tunisia now speak the languages of their current country as their first language.

=== Current situation ===
Language vitality: Judeo-Tunisian Arabic is believed to be vulnerable with only 500 speakers in Tunisia and with about 45,000 speakers in Israel

Language variations: In Tunisia, Tunisian Judeo-Arabic varies considerably by region. The main dialects are:

- The dialect of the North of Tunisia (Mainly spoken in Tunis)
- The dialect of the South of Tunisia (Mainly Spoken in Gabes)
- The dialect of the islands off the coast of the country (Mainly spoken in Djerba)

Judeo-Tunisian also varies by town within each region.

== Distinctives from Tunisian Arabic ==
Like all other Judeo-Arabic languages, Judeo-Tunisian Arabic is similar to the regional Arabic dialect from which it derives, Tunisian Arabic.

- Phonology: There are three main differences between Tunisian Arabic phonology and Judeo-Tunisian Arabic phonology:
  - Substitution of phonemes: Unlike most dialects of Tunisian Arabic, Judeo-Tunisian Arabic has merged Tunisian Arabic's glottal [ʔ] and [h] into [∅], Interdental [ð] and [θ] have respectively been merged with [d] and [t], Ḍah and Ḍād have been merged as [dˤ] and not as [ðˤ], Prehilalian /aw/ and /ay/ diphthongs have been kept (except in Gabes), and [χ] and [ʁ] have been respectively substituted by [x] and [ɣ]. This is mainly explained by the difference between the language contact submitted by Jewish communities in Tunisia and the one submitted by other Tunisian people.
  - Sibilant conversion:
    - [ʃ] and [ʒ] are realized as [sˤ] and [zˤ] if there is an emphatic consonant or [q] later in the word (however in Gabes this change takes effect if [ʃ] and [ʒ] are either before or after an emphatic consonant or [q]). For example, راجل rājil (meaning man) is pronounced in Gabes dialect of Judeo-Tunisian Arabic as /rˤa:zˤel/ and حجرة ḥajra (meaning stone) is pronounced in all Judeo-Tunisian dialects as /ħazˤrˤa/.
    - [ʃ] and [ʒ] are realized as [s] and [z] if there is an [r] later in the word (Not applicable to the dialect of Gabes). For example, جربة jirba (meaning Djerba) is pronounced in all Judeo-Tunisian dialects except the one of Gabes as /zerba/.
  - Chibilant conversion: Unlike in the other Judeo-Arabic languages of the Maghreb, [sˤ], [s] and [z] are realized as [ʃ], [ʃ] and [ʒ] in several situations.
    - [sˤ] is realized as [ʃ] if there is not another emphatic consonant or a [q] within the word (only applicable to Gabes dialect) or if this [sˤ] is directly followed by a [d]. For example, صدر ṣdir (meaning chest) is pronounced as /ʃder/ and صف ṣaff (meaning queue) is pronounced in Gabes dialect of Judeo-Tunisian Arabic as /ʃaff/.
    - [s] and [z] are respectively realized as [ʃ] and [ʒ] if there is no emphatic consonant, no [q] and no [r] later in the word (In Gabes, this change takes effect if there is no [q] and no emphatic consonant within the word). For example, زبدة zibda (meaning butter) is pronounced as /ʒebda/.
  - Emphasis of [s] and [z]: Further than the possible conversion of [s] and [z] by [sˤ] and [zˤ] due to the phenomenon of the assimilation of adjacent consonants (also existing in Tunisian Arabic), [s] and [z] are also realized as [sˤ] and [zˤ] if there is an emphatic consonant or [q] later in the word (however in Gabes this change takes effect if [ʃ] and [ʒ] are either before or after an emphatic consonant or [q]). For example, سوق sūq (meaning market) is pronounced in Judeo-Tunisian Arabic as /sˤu:q/.
  - [q] and [g] phonemes: Unlike the Northwestern, Southeastern and Southwestern dialects of Tunisian Arabic, Judeo-Tunisian Arabic does not systematically substitute Classical Arabic [q] by [g]. Also, the [g] phoneme existing in Tunis, Sahil and Sfax dialects of Tunisian Arabic is rarely maintained and is mostly substituted by a [q] in Judeo-Tunisian. For example, بقرة (cow) is pronounced as /bagra/ in Tunis, Sahil and Sfax dialects of Tunisian Arabic and as /baqra/ in Judeo-Tunisian.
- Morphology: The morphology is quite the same as the one of Tunisian Arabic. However:
  - Judeo-Tunisian Arabic sometimes uses some particular morphological structures, such as typical clitics like qa-, that is used to denote the progressivity of a given action. For example, qayākil means he is eating.
  - Unlike Tunisian Arabic, Judeo-Tunisian Arabic is characterized by its extensive use of the passive form.
  - The informal lack of subject–verb agreement found in Tunisian and in Modern Standard Arabic does not exist in Judeo-Tunisian Arabic. For example, we say ed-dyār tebnēu الديار تبناوا and not ed-dyār tebnēt الديار تبنات (The houses were built).
- Vocabulary: There are some differences between the vocabulary of Tunisian Arabic and the one of Judeo-Tunisian Arabic. Effectively:
  - Unlike Tunisian Arabic, Judeo-Tunisian Arabic has a Hebrew adstratum. In fact, Cohen said that almost 5 percent of the Judeo-Tunisian words are from Hebrew origin. Furthermore, Judeo-Tunisian has acquired several specific words that do not exist in Tunisian like Ladino from language contact with Judaeo-Romance languages.
  - Unlike most Tunisian Arabic, Judeo-Tunisian kept Pre-Hilalian vocabulary usage patterns. For example, rā را is used instead of šūf شوف (commonly used in Tunisian Arabic) to mean "to see".
  - Unlike the Tunis dialect of Tunisian Arabic, Judeo-Tunisian Arabic is also known for the profusion of diminutives. For example:
    - qṭayṭas قطيطس (little or friendly cat) for qaṭṭūs قطّوس (cat).
    - klayib كليب (little or friendly dog) for kalb كلب (dog).
