= The King of Kings (1927 film) =

1927 silent film

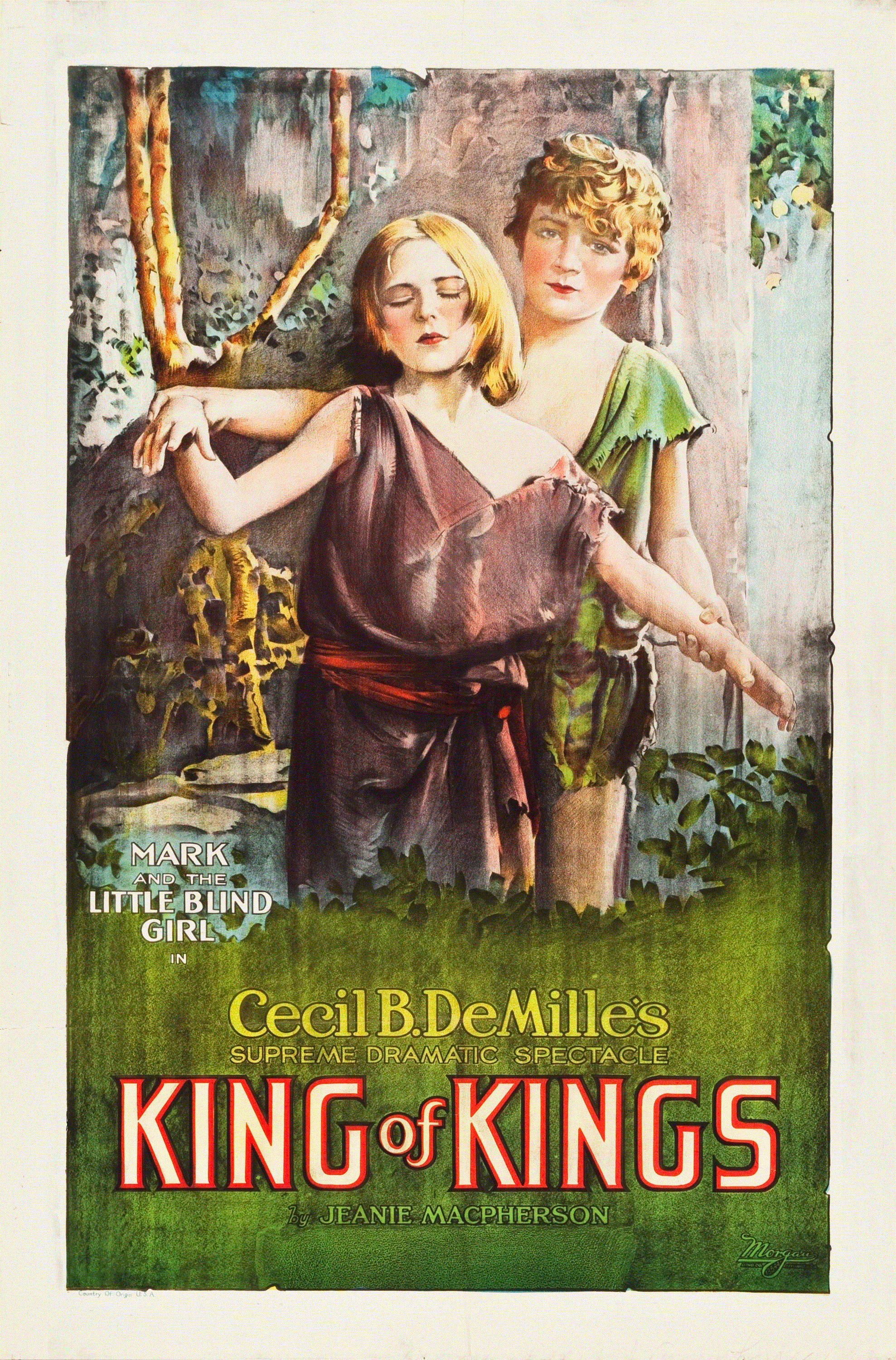
- Directed by: Cecil B. DeMille
- Written by: Jeanie MacPherson
- Based on: The Gospels of Matthew; Mark; Luke; John
- Produced by: Cecil B. DeMille
- Starring: H. B. Warner; Dorothy Cumming; Ernest Torrence; Joseph Schildkraut; Jacqueline Logan; Rudolph Schildkraut; Victor Varconi
- Cinematography: J. Peverell Marley; F. J. Westerberg
- Edited by: Anne Bauchens; Harold McLernon
- Music by: Hugo Riesenfeld (1927); Josiah Zuro (1928)
- Distributed by: Pathé Exchange
- Release date: April 19, 1927
- Running time: 155 minutes
- Country: United States
- Languages: Silent; English intertitles
- Budget: $1,265,284
- Box office: $2,641,687

The King of Kings (mute print without synchronized score)

The King of Kings is a 1927 American silent epic film produced and directed by Cecil B. DeMille. Starring H. B. Warner in the lead role, it depicts events in the life of Jesus, from the exorcism of Mary Magdalene to the crucifixion and resurrection. The screenplay was written by Jeanie MacPherson and includes verses from the Gospels of Matthew, Mark, Luke, and John.

Filming took place in 1926 in Santa Catalina Island and the DeMille Studios in Culver City, California. The opening and resurrection scenes were filmed in two-color Technicolor, other sequences were tinted sepia or yellow, and the torch flames in the blue-tinted scene of Jesus' arrest were hand colored.

The King of Kings first premiered in New York City on April 19, 1927, and later opened in Los Angeles on May 18. The film is the second in DeMille's biblical trilogy, preceded by The Ten Commandments (1923) and followed by The Sign of the Cross (1932).

== Story ==
The King of Kings (1950s re-release trailer)

Mary Magdalene is portrayed as a wild courtesan, entertaining many men around her. Upon learning that Judas is with a carpenter she rides out on her chariot drawn by zebras to get him back. Peter is introduced as the Giant apostle, and we see the future gospel writer Mark as a child who is healed by Jesus. Mary, the mother of Jesus, is shown as a beautiful and saintly woman who is a mother to all her son's followers. The first sight of Jesus is through the eyesight of a little girl, whom he heals. He is surrounded by a halo. Mary Magdelene arrives afterwards and talks to Judas, who reveals that he is staying with Jesus only in hopes of being made a high official after Jesus becomes the king of kings. Jesus casts the Seven Deadly Sins out of Mary Magdalene in a multiple exposure sequence.

Jesus is also shown healing a boy possessed by a demon, resurrecting Lazarus from the dead and healing the little children. Some humor is derived when one girl asks if he can heal broken legs, and, when he says yes, she gives him a legless doll. Jesus smiles and repairs the doll. The crucifixion is foreshadowed when Jesus, having helped a poor family, wanders through the father's carpentry shop, and, himself a carpenter's son, he briefly helps carve a piece of wood. When a sheet covering the object is removed, it is revealed to be a cross towering over Jesus.

Jesus and his apostles enter Jerusalem, where Judas incites the people and rallies them to proclaim Jesus as the King of the Jews. Jesus, however, renounces all claims of being an Earthly king. Caiaphas the High Priest is also angry at Judas for having led people to a man whom he sees as a false prophet. Meanwhile, Jesus drives away Satan, who had offered him an Earthly kingdom, and he protects a woman caught in adultery. The words he draws in the sand are revealed to be the sins the accusers themselves committed.

Judas, desperate to save himself from Caiaphas, agrees to turn over Jesus. Noticeably at the Last Supper, when Jesus distributes the bread and wine saying that they are his body and blood, Judas refuses to eat or drink. Towards the end, Mary confronts her son and tells him to flee from the danger that is coming. Jesus replies that it must be done for the salvation of all peoples.

Jesus goes to the Garden of Gethsemane where he is soon captured by the Roman soldiers and betrayed by Judas. Judas' life is saved, but, upon seeing that Jesus is going to be killed as a result, he is horrified. Judas takes a rope that the Romans had used to bind Jesus' wrists and runs off. Jesus is beaten and then presented by Pontius Pilate to the crowd. Mary pleads for the life of her son and Mary Magdalene speaks for him but Caiaphas bribes the crowd to shout against Jesus.

Jesus is taken away to be crucified, though he pauses on the Via Dolorosa to heal a group of cripples in an alley, despite his weakened condition. Jesus is crucified and his enemies throw insults at him. When Jesus does die, however, there is a great earthquake. The tree where Judas had hanged himself, with the rope used to bind Jesus's wrists, is swallowed up amidst bursts of hellfire. The sky turns black, lightning strikes, the wind blows, the people who had mocked Jesus run in terror, and the veil covering the Holy of Holies in the Jerusalem Temple is torn in two.

The tumult ends when Mary looks up at heaven and asks God to forgive the world for the death of their son. The chaos ends and the sun shines. Jesus is taken down from the cross and is buried. On the third day, he rises from the dead as promised. To emphasize the importance of the resurrection, this scene from an otherwise tinted monochrome film is shot in Technicolor. Jesus goes to the Apostles and tells them to spread his message to the world. He tells them "I am with you always" as the scene shifts to a modern city to show that Jesus still watches over his followers.

Many of the film's intertitles are quotes (or paraphrases) from Scripture, often with chapter and verse accompanying.

== Cast ==
- H. B. Warner as Jesus
- Dorothy Cumming as Mary, the mother of Jesus
- Ernest Torrence as Peter
- Joseph Schildkraut as Judas Iscariot
- James Neill as James the Great
- Joseph Striker as John the Apostle
- Robert Edeson as Matthew the Apostle
- Sidney D'Albrook as Thomas, the Doubter
- David Imboden as Andrew – a Fisherman
- Charles Belcher as Philip the Apostle
- Clayton Packard as Bartholomew the Apostle
- Robert Ellsworth as Simon – the Zealot
- Charles Requa as James the Less
- John T. Prince as Thaddeus
- Jacqueline Logan as Mary Magdalene
- Rudolph Schildkraut as Caiaphas – High Priest of Israel
- Sam De Grasse as Pharisee
- Casson Ferguson as Scribe
- Victor Varconi as Pontius Pilate
- Majel Coleman as Proculla – Wife of Pilate
- Montagu Love as Roman Centurion
- William Boyd as Simon of Cyrene
- Micky Moore as Mark
- Theodore Kosloff as Malchus – Captain of the High Priest's Guard
- George Siegmann as Barabbas
- Julia Faye as Martha
- Josephine Norman as Mary of Bethany
- Kenneth Thomson as Lazarus
- Alan Brooks as Satan
- Viola Louie as Adulterous Woman
- Muriel McCormac as Blind Girl
- Clarence Burton as Dysmas – the Repentant Thief
- Jim Mason as Gestas – the Unrepentant Thief
- May Robson as Mother of Gestas
- Dot Farley as Maidservant of Caiaphas
- Hector V. Sarno as Galilean Carpenter
- Leon Holmes as Imbecile Boy
- Otto Lederer as Eber – a Pharisee
- Bryant Washburn as Young Roman
- Lionel Belmore as Roman Noble
- Monte Collins as Rich Judeaean
- Lucio Flamma as Gallant of Galilee
- Sôjin Kamiyama as Prince Of Persia
- André Cheron as Wealthy Merchant
- Willy Castello as Babylonian Noble
- Noble Johnson as Charioteer
- Jim Farley as Executioner
- James Dime as a Roman soldier

=== Cast notes ===
- Sally Rand was an extra in the film, years before becoming notorious for her "fan dance" at the 1933 World's Fair.
- Writer Ayn Rand (no relation to Sally Rand) also was an extra in the film, and met her future husband Frank O'Connor on set.
- Micky Moore was the last surviving cast member at his death in 2013.

== Production ==
=== Development ===
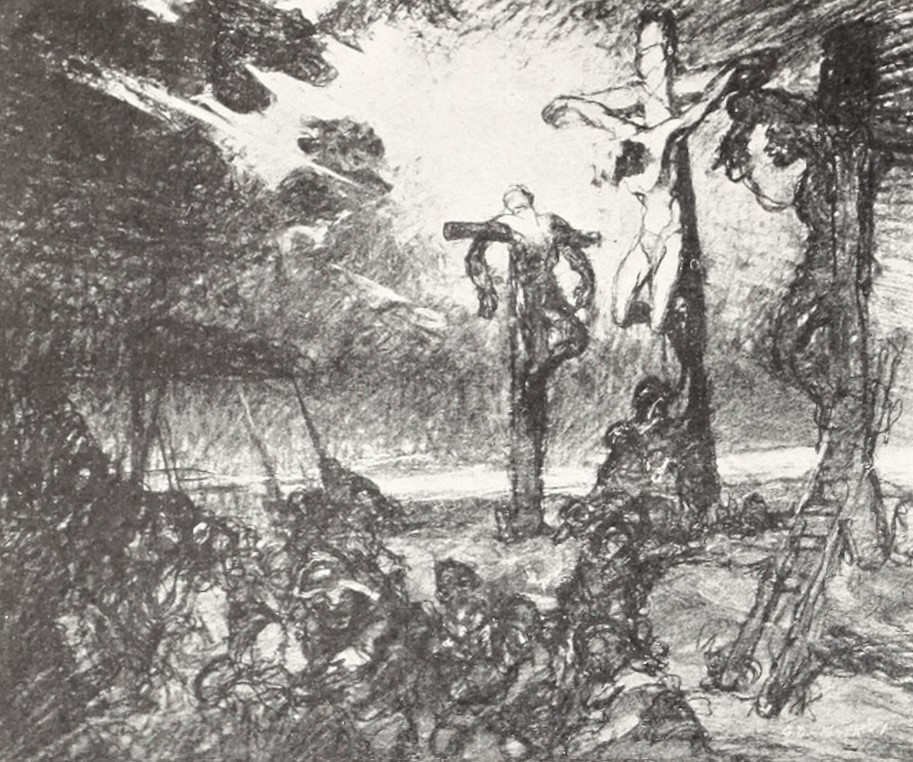
Dan Sayre Groesbeck's preliminary sketch for the crucifixion scene.

After the release of his film The Volga Boatman (1926), producer-director Cecil B. DeMille announced he was going to make a biblical epic titled The Deluge, depicting the story of Noah and the Ark. The idea came from a worldwide contest in which the public submitted suggestions for DeMille's new "companion-picture" to his first biblical film, The Ten Commandments (1923). He wanted to follow The Deluge with a film about Christ. By late May 1926, he had reportedly spent over $50,000 in research and story preparation but decided to cancel The Deluge when he found out that Warner Bros. were planning Noah's Ark and had already registered it with the Will Hays office. Denison Clift, a writer under contract to DeMille's studio, then suggested that DeMille should film the story of Jesus, "the one great single subject of all time and all ages". Clift proposed the title The King of Kings and thought DeMille was the ideal director for the project. Jeremiah Milbank agreed to finance the film.

DeMille's main inspiration for the look of the film were Frederic Shields' paintings of biblical characters and scenes. He also looked at the work of painter Peter Paul Rubens and Gustave Doré's illustrations for La Grande Bible de Tours. DeMille had sketches drawn for every scene, shot, costume, and prominent prop. He hired artists Dan Sayre Groesbeck, Anton Grot, Edward Jewel, Julian Harrison, and Harold Miles to draw the sketches, and had Adrian, Gwen Wakeling, and Earl Luick design the costumes. Groesbeck was one of DeMille's favorite artists because he had a "great gift for form and color" and "could capture character and drama in a few strokes of his brush".

DeMille and screenwriter Jeanie MacPherson initially planned to write the script in a two-part structure consisting of the biblical account and a modern story about a man who tries to follow Jesus' teachings, but this idea was abandoned early on. They were assisted by writers Denison Clift, Clifford Howard, and Jack Jungmeyer. DeMille chose to begin the screenplay with a scene depicting Mary Magdalene as a courtesan because he knew that skeptics and cynics would go and see the film and he wanted to "jolt them all out of their preconceptions" with something "none of them would be expecting". He also included a brief extrabiblical romance between Judas Iscariot and Mary Magdalene, which was based on a medieval German legend.

=== Casting ===
In June 1926, DeMille cast H.B. Warner as Jesus. In his autobiography, DeMille said:

There was only one man, I felt, who could portray the Christ, with all the virility and all the tenderness, with all the authority yet all the restraint, with all the compassion and all the strength, and with the touch of gentle humor and enjoyment of small simple things and human love of friends and divine love of His enemies, that the Man of Nazareth had. It was literally a superhuman assignment that I gave to the actor I chose for the part, H. B. Warner.

DeMille wanted Gloria Swanson for the role of Mary Magdalene, but Swanson was planning her first film with United Artists and would not be available to work with DeMille. Screen tests were made of more than 30 actresses, including May Allison, Barbara Bedford, Evelyn Brent, Ruth Clifford, Marguerite De La Motte, Paulette Duval, Julia Faye, Jetta Goudal, Phyllis Haver, Kathleen Key, Lila Lee, Ann McKay, Seena Owen, Selena Royle, Gretchen Thomas, and Virginia Valli. DeMille's top choices included Vilma Bánky, Mildred Harris, Jobyna Ralston, and Estelle Taylor. He narrowed it down to five actresses and created a committee to choose the best candidate. (Note: According to a letter DeMille sent to every actress who auditioned, the committee was made up of Jesse L. Lasky, Samuel Goldwyn, Bruce Barton, Sid Grauman, Lasky's wife, and Barton's wife. An announcement from the DeMille studio said that the committee also included the film's screenwriter Jeanie MacPherson and Rev. George Reid Andrews.) In August, Jacqueline Logan was chosen because "she could blend dramatic emotion with spirituality."

DeMille selected Rudolph Schildkraut for the part of Caiaphas. He later said Schildkraut was "perhaps the finest character actor ever to appear in motion pictures. He was as fine a man as he was an actor." Schildkraut's son, Joseph Schildkraut, was cast as Judas Iscariot.

Many famous actors accepted small roles because they wanted to be a part of the film.

=== Filming ===
Before filming began, DeMille gathered the film's cast members and told them the story in a two-hour talk in which he mentioned every scene and all of the dialogue. Many of the leading actors were given a copy of the New Testament, a copy of MacPherson's script, and access to the facilities of the studio's research department so they could study and prepare for their roles. Every scene angle was filmed in three different takes: the first shot allowed the actors to give their own interpretation, the second one was reserved for DeMille's direction and elaborations, and the third one included input from the cameraman and DeMille's associates. DeMille's meticulous filming method and three-camera setup meant there were nine views of each angle and 27 views of each scene, which included close-ups, medium shots, and long shots. The actors' contracts required them to see the dailies of the work they had done the day before, and during these viewings, the first take was often selected because it frequently had "the best continuity." Most times the second take was better due to DeMille's suggestions or the actors' improvements. Writer Henry MacMahon said that "each principal [actor] was encouraged to develop the conception [of the role] freely and to work up the character building from the first scene right up to the last." The performances of the actors also benefited from the story being filmed in sequence.

Filming was done in the utmost secrecy. Reporters and columnists were given advance word about the picture in only the most generic terms, without further details. Nor did DeMille permit photographs to be taken of the actors in costume. In 1936, DeMille revealed the constraints imposed upon the leading actor: "Harry [H. B.] Warner thoroughly realized the grave difficulty that confronted him in the portrayal of this role. I explained that during the production of the picture, which would take approximately a year, he would have to be virtually a recluse. He could not be seen in cafes, theaters, or other places that would bring comment or cause him to be pointed out as the man who was portraying the role of Christ. Further, he could not smoke in the studio or be seen in the studio cafe or anywhere on the lot in the makeup of the role. A small, closed room was provided for Warner's use on each set, and after the completion of each scene he would retire there alone. Going to and from the dressing room he wore a hooded cowl. He did not accept any social invitations, nor did I wish him to entertain at his own home. Warner lived the life of a hermit during that contract, but he realized as well as I did that it could not be otherwise. I might add that his personal sacrifices during the portrayal of that great role were well rewarded in the fine, tender spirit of the finished performance."

Dorothy Cumming, who played Christ's mother, had a similarly restrictive contract. Because DeMille felt that Christians would not accept any negative reflections cast upon Christ or his mother, he had Cumming sign a contract on August 21, 1926, that regulated her private life for seven years. It included clauses that precluded her from divorcing her husband for any act, to do anything that would give her husband grounds for divorce, or to play a prostitute or similar role in any film. These contractual details were revealed during a divorce trial when Cumming opposed her husband, Frank Elliott. The contract did not prevent the divorce.

The Galilee sequence was filmed at Santa Catalina Island, but most of the film was shot in the DeMille studio. The set representing the Second Temple was considered one of the largest film sets ever built. The end wall of a large stage was removed to make enough space for the construction of both the interior and the exterior of the Praetorium set. This set included a 37-foot-tall (11 m) bronze replica of the Eagle of Rome behind Pilate's throne.

The film has two Technicolor sequences, the beginning and the resurrection scene, which use the two-color (reds and greens) process invented by Herbert Kalmus. The rest of the film is presented in various shades of sepiatone and monochrome.

== Release ==
=== Roadshow and synchronized sound versions ===
The roadshow theatrical release, with the film shown in selected theaters across America at advanced prices, took place in 1927. The roadshow version ran 16 reels (about two hours and 40 minutes, plus an intermission).

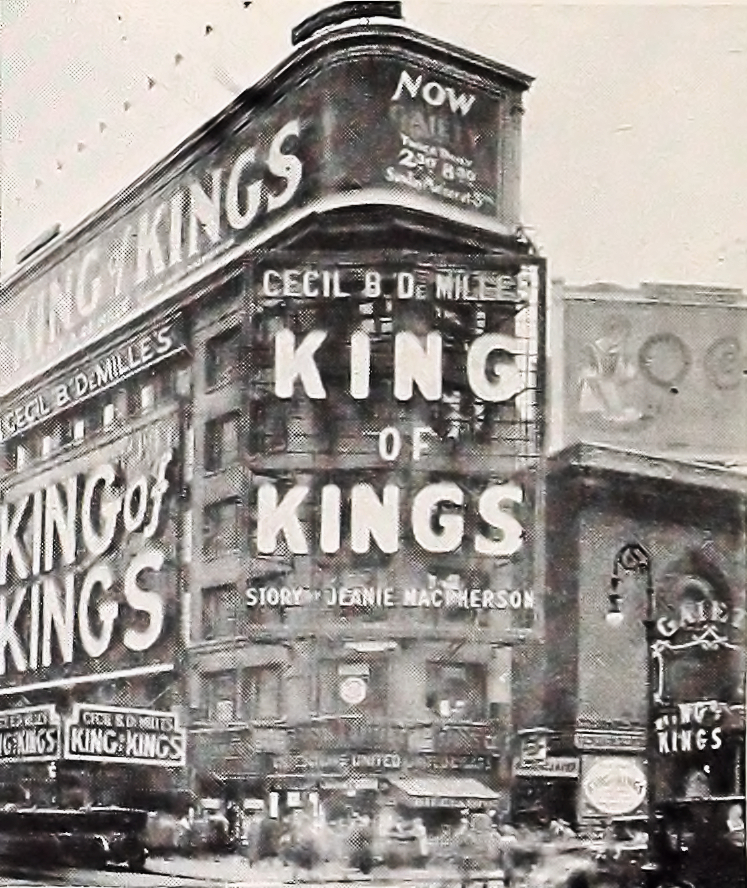
Advertising for Cecil B. DeMille's The King of Kings in Times Square, New York.

The King of Kings was the first film to premiere at the noted Grauman's Chinese Theatre in Los Angeles, California on May 18, 1927. The film was screened there again on May 24, 1977, to commemorate the theater's 50th anniversary.

In what is considered one of the earliest applications of market segmentation to film promotion, students ranging from elementary to high school were dismissed early to attend afternoon screenings of the film. The King of Kings was seen by around 500 million viewers between its original release in 1927 and the remake released in 1961.

The film's 1928 general-release print, which is the version most audiences saw, was edited to 12 reels (one hour and 55 minutes), and equipped with a new set of title cards as required by the new sound-film aspect ratio, so that none of the text would be cut off in projection. The Technicolor scenes were printed in black-and-white, because Technicolor film stock was then too fragile to be used for mass distribution in hundreds of theaters.

This 1928 version of The King of Kings was also fitted with an RCA Photophone soundtrack: a synchronized orchestra score conducted by Hugo Riesenfeld, and realistic sound effects. The sound added a new dimension to the silent action, this during a time when much of the public was still skeptical about the application of sound in motion pictures. Motion Picture News reported, "If anyone has any doubt as to the effectiveness of sound in pictures, this will be completely dispelled when the sound effects are revealed under the Photophone process in The King of Kings. It is so realistic as to be absolutely astounding and actually borders on the horrifying. There are the flashes of lightning, the cracking and rolling of the thunder, and the horrified screams of the multitude as the earth opens up from the series of earthquakes and they are plunged into the great crevices. All this brings realism that must of necessity have been absent from the silent films."

=== Censorship ===
Film censorship in the United States in the 1920s was performed by several state and city censor boards. The Memphis Board of Censors ordered cut 900 feet of the film depicting the scourging and crucifixion of Jesus, but the Lyric Theatre in Memphis, under guidance provided by Pathé, showed the film uncut starting on March 5, 1928, which led to the arrest of the theatre manager Vincent Carline. A lower court held that the censor board decisions were subject to court review and released the manager, allowing the film to be shown without interference from police or the censor board. However, on appeal this decision was reversed by the Tennessee Court of Appeals, which held that the acts of the Memphis Censor Board were not subject to judicial review provided the board did not exceed its authority, so the board's cuts to the film were legal and final.

In the United Kingdom, the film was initially banned by the London County Council due to a rule that prohibited films from showing a materialized Christ, which led to a revision of the local censorship rules.

== Reception ==
=== Critical response ===
The King of Kings received praise from critics. The Film Daily stated: "There can be said nothing but praise for the reverence and appreciation with which the beautiful story has been developed. . . The King of Kings is tremendous from every standpoint. It is the finest piece of screen craftsmanship ever turned out by DeMille". Photoplay described the film as "Cecil B. DeMille's finest motion picture effort" and thought he took "the most difficult and exalted theme in the world's history—the story of Jesus Christ—and transcribed it intelligently and ably to the screen." Norbert Lusk of Picture Play believed "The King of Kings is Cecil B. DeMille's masterpiece, and is among the greatest of all pictures. It is a sincere and reverent visualization of the last three years in the life of Christ, produced on a scale of tasteful magnificence, finely acted by the scores in it, and possessed of moments of poignant beauty and unapproachable drama. This is a picture that will never become outmoded."

=== Accolades ===
In June 1927, Photoplay named the film one of "The Best Pictures of the Month". For their work in The King of Kings, H. B. Warner, Victor Varconi, Rudolph Schildkraut, and Ernest Torrence were included among "The Best Performances of the Month".

In January 1928, The New York Times named The King of Kings one of the ten best films of 1927 and Cecil B. DeMille was listed as one of the ten best directors.

It is widely considered to be among the most popular Hollywood biblical epic films depicting the life of Christ.

== Lawsuit ==
In 1928, actress Valeska Surratt and scholar Mirza Ahmad Sohrab sued DeMille for stealing the scenario for The King of Kings from them. The case went to trial in February 1930 but eventually was settled without additional publicity. Surratt, who had left films to return to the stage in 1917, appeared to have been unofficially blacklisted after the suit.

== Preservation ==
Complete prints of The King of Kings are held by:

- Cinematheque Royale de Belgique
- Cineteca Del Friuli in Gemona (on 16 mm)
- George Eastman Museum
- Library of Congress (on 35 mm)
- Cineteca Nazionale (on 35 mm)
- Arhiva Națională de Filme
- UCLA Film and Television Archive (on 35 mm and LaserDisc)
- British Film Institute
- Yugoslav Film Archive

== See also ==
- King of Kings (1961 film) directed by Nicholas Ray
- List of Easter films
- List of early color feature films
- List of early sound feature films (1926–1929)

== Bibliography ==
- Birchard, Robert S. (2004). Cecil B. DeMille's Hollywood. University Press of Kentucky. ISBN 978-0-8131-2636-4.
- DeMille, Cecil B. (1959). The Autobiography of Cecil B. DeMille. Prentice Hall. ISBN 978-0824057572.
