= Santa Barbara County Superior Court =

California superior court with jurisdiction over Santa Barbara County

Superior Court of California, County of Santa Barbara
- Santa Barbara County Courthouse (1929), photographed by Carol Highsmith in 2012
- Interactive map of Superior Court of California, County of Santa Barbara
- 34.4240°N 119.7021°W
- Established: 1850
- Jurisdiction: Santa Barbara County, California
- Location: Santa Barbara (county seat); Santa Maria; Lompoc; Solvang
- Coordinates: 34.4240°N 119.7021°W
- Appeals to: California Court of Appeal for the Second District, Division Six
- Website: santabarbara.courts.ca.gov

Presiding Judge
- Currently: Hon. Patricia L. Kelly

Assistant Presiding Judge
- Currently: Hon. Von T. Deroian

Court Executive Officer
- Currently: Darrel E. Parker

The Superior Court of California, County of Santa Barbara, informally known as the Santa Barbara County Superior Court, is the California superior court with jurisdiction over Santa Barbara County.

== History ==
Santa Barbara County was one of the original counties formed in 1850 when California was admitted as a state.

The first County Judge was Joaquin Carrillo, and the Second Judicial District was headed by Judge Henry A. Teffts; Judge Teffts drowned while attempting to land at Port Harford, and he was succeeded by Judge Carrillo, who held the position until 1866. In the early history of the county, court was held at Egerea House; records show that Thomas Robbins was paid $447 for six months of rent in 1851 and that later, "the house of Fabrigat was rented for a Court House" in 1852.

A neo-Gothic courthouse and Italianate Hall of Records were built between 1875 and 1888; those buildings were badly damaged by the 1925 Santa Barbara earthquake and were demolished.

The current Santa Barbara County Courthouse was completed and dedicated in 1929 in the Spanish Colonial Revival style, designed by William Mooser III, on the site where the 1872 courthouse had once stood. It was added to the National Register of Historic Places in 1981, and named a California Historical Landmark in 2003 as No. 1037. The county courthouse was credited as the genesis and inspiration for the restyling of the entire city of Santa Barbara, which "was once the average American Victorian town, with little distinctiveness." Mooser, who had just returned from a 17-year stay in Spain, moved to Santa Barbara in 1926 to direct the building of the new courthouse.

== Venues ==
Santa Barbara County Superior Court locations:
1 1100 Anacapa St (Santa Barbara, Civil)
118 E Figueroa St (SB, Criminal)
1108 Santa Barbara St (SB, Juvenile & Jury Services)
2 4434 Calle Real (SB, Pre-Trial Services)
3 312 E Cook St (Santa Maria, Civil, Criminal, & Jury Services)
4 4285-B California Blvd (SM, Juvenile)
4251 California Blvd (SM, Pre-Trial Services)
5 115 Civic Center Pl (Lompoc)
6 1745 Mission Dr (Solvang, Traffic only)

In addition to the main courthouse campus in the county seat, Santa Barbara, satellite courts operate in Santa Maria, the county's largest city, and Lompoc. Another satellite court operated in Solvang, but most cases have now been consolidated to Lompoc, with Solvang currently serving only traffic court cases twice a month.
