= Tunisian Arabic morphology =

The grammar, conjugation, and the morphology of Tunisian Arabic is very similar to that of other Maghrebi Arabic varieties. It is based on Classical Arabic and influenced by Berber languages and Latin, with some morphological inventions. The Berber influence is more noticeable in Pre-Hilalian dialects.

== Pronouns ==
=== Personal pronouns ===
Tunisian Arabic has 7 personal pronouns since gender differentiation of the 2nd person in the singular form is absent.

| Person | Singular | Plural |
|---|---|---|
| 1st | ani آني | aḥnā أحنا |
| 2nd | intī إنتِي | intom انتوم |
| 3rd (m) | hūwa هوة | hūma هومة |
| 3rd (f) | hīya هية | hūma هومة |

Example : آني زادة « Ani zēda. » — "Me too."

=== Possessive pronouns ===
The possessive pronouns are used as possessive articles when put as a suffix to a preposition or a noun. When it is used after a verb, their functions are rather direct object pronouns. The ones between parenthesis are the ones used after a structure finishing by a vowel.

| Person | Singular | Plural |
|---|---|---|
| 1st | -ī (-yā) ي- | -nā نا- |
| 2nd | -ik (-k) ك- | -kum كم- |
| 3rd (m) | -ū (-h) ه- | -hum هم- |
| 3rd (f) | -hā ها- | -hum هم- |

Note, that with feminine words which are generally finished with an ة a, a ت t is added before the suffixes which become tī, tik, tū, thā, tnā, tkum and thum

=== Indirect object pronouns ===
Indirect Object Pronouns are used as a suffix after the verb and before the ش- -š of the negation. When there is a combination of direct and indirect object pronouns, indirect object pronouns are always written in the end. Furthermore, the first short i for the indirect Object pronoun is always dropped when it is written after a vowel.

| Person | Singular | Plural |
|---|---|---|
| 1st | -lī لي- | -ilnā لنا- |
| 2nd | -lik لك- | -ilkum لكم- |
| 3rd (m) | -lū له- | -ilhum لهم- |
| 3rd (f) | -ilhā لها- | -ilhum لهم- |

=== Indefinite pronouns ===
Indefinite pronouns are used as a subject to explain general ideas or to report the facts which were done by an unknown person:

- واحد wāḥid (m.), واحدة waḥda (f.), وحود wḥūd (pl.) "Someone"
- الواحد il-wāḥid "The individual"
- أيّ eyy "Any"
- كل واحد kull wāḥid "Everyone"
- حاجة ḥāja "Something"
- حتّى ḥattā "Any" (Negative Polarity Item)
- حتّى واحد ḥattā wāḥid "Anyone"
- آخر āxir (m.), أخرة uxra (f.), أخرين uxrīn (pl.) "Other"
- الكل il-kull "All"

== Interrogative pronouns ==
The next interrogative pronouns are used when asking a question in Tunisian Arabic.

| Tunisian Arabic | English | Notes |
|---|---|---|
| شنوة šnūwa (m.), شنية šnīya (f.), شنومة šnūma (pl.) | What | šnīya is used with feminine words. šnūma is used with plural words. |
| آش āš or ش- š- | What | Used with verbs and some nouns. |
| شكون škūn | Who | |
| آما āmā | Which | |
| وقتاش waqtāš | When | |
| علاش ɛlāš | Why | |
| لواش lwāš | What for | |
| وين wīn or فين fīn | Where | |
| منين mnīn | Where ... from | |
| لوين lwīn | Where ... to | |
| كيفاش kīfāš | How | |
| قدّاش qaddāš | How many | |
| بقدّاش bqaddāš | How much | |
| فاش fāš | What ... in | |
| مناش mnāš | What ... of | |
| آناهو ānāhū (m.), آناهي ānāhī (f.), آناهم ānāhum (pl.) | Which one(s) | |

== Articles ==
=== Definite articles ===
Translated in English as "The" Article, "il-" (ال) is used as an added prefix to denote nouns as definite. If the defined nouns begins with a Sun Consonant (n, ṇ, t, ṭ, d, dz, s, ṣ, š, z, ẓ, j, ŧ, đ, ḑ, l, r and ṛ), "il-" would be pronounced as i + the Sun Consonant with which the noun begins. For example:

- الجريدة il-jarīda [ɪʒ:æri:dæ] meaning the Newspaper
- الكرسي il-kursī [ɪlkʊrsi] meaning the chair

=== Demonstrative articles ===
Like in Standard Arabic, Demonstrative Articles can be used as demonstrative pronouns when they are put alone as subjects. When they are articles, they can be written before or after the considered noun which should be definite by "il-".

| Demonstrative Articles | Tunisian Arabic | Pronunciation |
|---|---|---|
| This (near the speaker) | هاذا or هاذاية (m), هاذي or هاذية (f) | hāđa or hāđāya (m), hāđī or hāđīya (f) |
| This (far from the speaker) | هاكا or هاكاية (m), هاكي or هاكية (f) | hāka or hākāya (m), hākī or hākīya (f) |
| That | هاذاكة (m), هاذيكة (f) | hāđāka, hāđīka |
| These | هاذومة | hāđūma |
| Those | هاذوكم | hāđūkum |

For example: "This book" could be written in Tunisian as هٰاذا الكتاب hāđā il-ktāb or even as الكتاب هٰاذا il-ktāb hāđā.

When the demonstrative article is before the noun, it can be substituted by an abbreviated form which is ها hā for this and these, هاذْ hāđ for this and هٰاكْ hāk for that and those.

For example, "This book" could be written in Tunisian as ها الكتاب hā il-ktāb.

=== Possessive articles ===
| Possessive article | Tunisian Arabic | Pronunciation |
|---|---|---|
| my | متاعي | mtāɛī |
| your (in Singular) | متاعك | mtāɛik |
| his | متاعه | mtāɛū |
| her | متاعها | mtāɛhā |
| our | متاعنا | mtāɛnā |
| your (in Plural) | متاعكم | mtāɛkum |
| their | متاعهم | mtāɛhum |

Although they do exist, possessive articles in Tunisian Arabic are not used the same way as in English. They mainly show possession valorization in a sentence. Furthermore, they are only used after a definite noun.

For example: الكورة متاعك "il-kūra mtāɛik"- "Your ball"

Indeed, as in Arabic and other languages, possessive pronouns replaces them when there is not a valorization and a stress of the fact of possessing the item. These suffixes are the same as the ones used for conjugation of some verbs, and represent the ending sound of the possessive articles.

For example: كورتك "kūrtik"- "Your ball"

== Modal verbs ==
Unlike English, where modal verbs are followed by the bare infinitive, Tunisian Arabic requires the **imperfect (present) form** of the verb.

In some cases, the second verb may instead appear in the **perfect (past) form**, particularly with **راه rāh**, **حقّه ḥaqqū**, and **ماذابيه māḏābīh**, which do not have an independent past tense. In these contexts, the particle **لوكان lūkān** ("if it were that…") is generally used before the verb.

The verb **قاعد qāʕid** can precede an active participle to indicate **progressive aspect** ("to be currently doing").

All modal verbs can be negated, similar to English modals, with the exception of **راه rāh** and **ماذابيه māḏābīh**. For example: - *ماذابينا نمشيوا* (*māḏābīnā nimšīū*, "we had better go") → negative: *ماذابينا ما نمشيوش* (*māḏābīnā mā nimšīūš*). - *راه تكلّم* (*rāh tkallim*, "obviously he spoke") → negative: *راه ما تكلّمش* (*rāh mā tkallimš*).

=== Hāhū (existential copula, pointing to presence) ===
Some scholars analyze **hāhū** as a **deictic particle** built from the demonstrative *hā-* ("here is…") plus a pronominal suffix. Others have proposed Punic influence (*hā-* used as an attention marker).

| Person | Tunisian Arabic | Pronunciation |
|---|---|---|
| I am | هاني | hānī |
| You are (sg.) | هاك | hāk |
| He is | هاو | hāw |
| She is | هاهي | hāhī |
| We are | هانا | hānā |
| You are (pl.) | هاكم | hākum |
| They are | هاهم | hāhum |

Example: *هاني هوني* (*hānī hūnī*, "I'm here").

=== Rāhū (copula, emphasizing immediacy) ===
  - Rāhū** emphasizes immediacy or certainty, often glossed as "look, indeed." It is built on *rā* ("see, behold") plus a pronoun suffix.

| Person | Tunisian Arabic | Pronunciation |
|---|---|---|
| I am | راني | rānī |
| You are (sg.) | راك | rāk |
| He is | راهو | rāhū |
| She is | راها | rāhā |
| We are | رانا | rānā |
| You are (pl.) | راكم | rākuṃ |
| They are | راهم | rāhum |

Example: *راني هوني* (*rānī hūnī*, "I'm right here").

=== Māhū (evidential / tag marker) ===
  - Māhū** functions as an evidential particle or tag-question marker ("isn't it?"). It combines the negator *ma-* with the pronominal copula.

| Person | Tunisian Arabic | Pronunciation |
|---|---|---|
| Am I not | ماني | mānī |
| Are you not | ماك | māk |
| Is he not | ماهو | māhū |
| Is she not | ماها | māhā |
| Are we not | مانا | mānā |
| Are you not (pl.) | ماكم | mākum |
| Are they not | ماهم | māhum |

Examples: - *ماني هوني* (*mānī hūnī*, "I'm here, am I not?"). - *ماشيين، ماهو؟* (*māshīn, māhū?*, "We're going, aren't we?").

=== Qāʕid (progressive aspect) ===
  - Qāʕid** + participle expresses ongoing action ("to be doing at the moment").

| Person | Tunisian Arabic | Pronunciation |
|---|---|---|
| I am | قاعد | qāʕid |
| You are (sg.) | قاعد | qāʕid |
| He is | قاعد | qāʕid |
| She is | قاعدة | qāʕda |
| We are | قاعدين | qāʕdīn |
| You are (pl.) | قاعدين | qāʕdīn |
| They are | قاعدين | qāʕdīn |

Example: *قاعدين ناكلوا* (*qāʕdīn nāklū*, "we are eating").

=== Najjam (could, past ability) ===
| Person | Tunisian Arabic | Pronunciation |
|---|---|---|
| I could | نجّمت | najjamt |
| You could (sg.) | نجّمت | najjamt |
| He could | نجّم | najjam |
| She could | نجّمت | najjmit |
| We could | نجّمنا | najjamnā |
| You could (pl.) | نجّمتوا | najjamtū |
| They could | نجّمو | najjmū |

Example: *نجّمو ياكلوا* (*najjmū yākulū*, "they could eat").

=== Ynajjam (can, present ability) ===
| Person | Tunisian Arabic | Pronunciation |
|---|---|---|
| I can | ننجّم | nnajjam |
| You can (sg.) | تنجّم | tnajjam |
| He can | ينجّم | ynajjam |
| She can | تنجّم | tnajjam |
| We can | ننجّمو | nnajjmu |
| You can (pl.) | تنجّمو | tnajjmu |
| They can | ينجّمو | ynajjmu |

Example: *ينجّمو ياكلوا* (*ynajjmu yākulū*, "they can eat").

=== Ḥaqqū (should) ===
Literally "it is his right / it is fitting," this form is grammaticalized into a modal meaning "should."

| Person | Tunisian Arabic | Pronunciation |
|---|---|---|
| I should | حقني | ḥaqnī |
| You should (sg.) | حقك | ḥaqik |
| He should | حقه | ḥaqū |
| She should | حقها | ḥaqhā |
| We should | حقنا | ḥaqnā |
| You should (pl.) | حقكم | ḥaqkum |
| They should | حقهم | ḥaqhum |

Example: *حقه يتكلّم* (*ḥaqū yitkallim*, "he should speak").

=== Lāzim / Yilzem (must / have to) ===
Both forms derive from the root *l-z-m* "to be necessary": - *lāzim* = "must" (internal obligation). - *yilzem* = "have to" (external necessity).

Examples: - *لازمنا نمشيوا* (*lāzimnā nimšīū*, "we must go"). - *يلزمنا نمشيوا* (*yilzimnā nimšīū*, "we have to go").

=== Māḏābīh (had better) ===
  - Māḏābīh** expresses preference or advisability, often glossed as "had better / would like." It inflects with pronominal suffixes.

| Person | Tunisian Arabic | Pronunciation |
|---|---|---|
| I had better | ماذابيا | māḏābīyā |
| You had better (sg.) | ماذابيك | māḏābīk |
| He had better | ماذابيه | māḏābīh |
| She had better | ماذابيها | māḏābīhā |
| We had better | ماذابينا | māḏābīnā |
| You had better (pl.) | ماذابيكم | māḏābīkum |
| They had better | ماذابيهم | māḏābīhum |

Example: *ماذابينا نمشيوا* (*māḏābīnā nimšīū*, "we had better go").

== Discourse markers ==
Tunisian Arabic involve Discourse markers that are used to emphasize some facts in discussions. These facts could be even evidences and conclusions.

=== Evidence markers ===
Evidence markers are mainly modal verbs. ṛāhū راهه is used to mark a fact as evident in the affirmative form. It is substituted by ṃāhū ماهه when asking about a supposed evident fact.

=== Conclusion markers ===
Conclusion markers are mainly conjunctions. yāxī ياخي is used to mark a fact as a conclusion in the affirmative form. It is substituted by mālā مالا when asking to approve supposed conclusion.

== Preverbal markers ==
Preverbal markers or auxiliaries are verbs that are used to denote the status of a given action. They are conjugated as Subject + Preverbal marker (Any tense and form) + Action Verb (In present unless the preverbal marker is in imperative. The verb is in imperative in this situation). For example, qūm ixdim قوم اخدم meaning go to work.

| Tunisian Arabic | English | Status |
|---|---|---|
| kān كان + Action Verb | to be doing something | Finalization |
| bdā بدا + Action Verb | to begin doing something | Initiation |
| qɛad قعد + Action Verb | to stay doing something | Progression |
| ɛāwid عاود + Action Verb | to return doing something | Repetition |
| ḥabb حب + Action Verb | to like doing something | Passion |
| jā جا + Action Verb | to come doing something | Intention |
| qām قام + Action Verb | to stand up to do something | Intention |
| ṣār صار + Action Verb | to become doing something | Initiation |
| wallā ولى + Action Verb | to become doing something | Initiation |
| mšā مشى + Action Verb | to be going to do something | Intention |
| bqā بقى + Action Verb | to remain doing something | Progression |
| rjaɛ رجع + Action Verb | to return doing something | Repetition |
| jarrib جرب + Action Verb | to try doing something | Experimentation |
| ittilizim اتلزم + Action Verb | to engage oneself in doing something | Engagement |
| kammal كمل + Action Verb | to finish doing something | Finalization |

== Verb conjugation ==
=== Perfective and imperfective tenses ===
==== Regular verbs ====
There are significant differences in morphology between Tunisian and Standard Arabic. Standard Arabic marks 13 person/number/gender distinctions in the verbal paradigm, whereas the dialect of Tunis marks only 7 (the gender distinction is found only in the third person singular). Nomadic Tunisian Arabic dialects also mark gender for the second person in singular, in common with most spoken varieties of Arabic elsewhere in the Arabic world.

In general, the regular verbs are conjugated according to the following pattern:

k-t-b "to write"
| | | perfective (Past) | | imperfective (Present) | |
| | | singular | plural | singular | plural |
|---|---|---|---|---|---|
| 1st person | | ktibt كتبت | ktibnā كتبنا | niktib نكتب | niktbū نكتبوا |
| 2nd person | | ktibt كتبت | ktibtū كتبتوا | tiktib تكتب | tiktbū تكتبوا |
| 3rd | masculine | ktib كتب | kitbū كتبوا | yiktib يكتب | yiktbū يكتبوا |
| 3rd | feminine | kitbit كتبت | kitbū كتبوا | tiktib تكتب | yiktbū يكتبوا |

The second-person singular of the three Nomadic Tunisian Arabic dialects has distinct masculine and feminine forms, with the masculine forms being as above كتبت ktibt and تكتب tiktib, and the feminine forms being كتبتِ ktibtī (perfective) and تكتبي tiktbī (imperfective).

==== Weak verbs ====
Verbs with a final semivowel ā, known as "weak" verbs, have a different pattern. This pattern is determined according to the third letter in the root of the verb. Moreover, the verbs having a glottal stop as a first letter of their root are also considered as weak verbs.

Nomadic dialects have a different third-person singular feminine perfective form as in مشيت [mʃit], حبيت [ħbit], بديت [bdit] and خذيت [χðit] and delete the stem vowel in the plural imperfective forms, giving forms such as نمشوا [nimʃu], نحبوا [niħbu], نبدوا [nibdu] and نوخذوا [nu:χðu]. Furthermore, Sahil and Southeastern dialects tend to use /eː/ in place of /iː/ in the perfective conjugation. For example, تمشيوا timcīū is pronounced as [timʃe:u] in Sahil and southeastern dialects.

[j] as a third letter of the root (y aspect) m-ʃ-j mšā "to go"
| | | perfective (Past) | | imperfective (Present) | |
| | | singular | plural | singular | plural |
|---|---|---|---|---|---|
| 1st person | | mšīt مشيت | mšīnā مشينا | nimšī نمشي | nimšīū نمشيوا |
| 2nd person | | mšīt مشيت | mšītū مشيتوا | timšī تمشي | timšīū تمشيوا |
| 3rd | masculine | mšā مشى | mšāū مشاوا | yimšī يمشي | yimšīū يمشيوا |
| 3rd | feminine | mšāt مشات | mšāū مشاوا | timšī تمشي | yimšīū يمشيوا |

[w] as a third letter of the root (w aspect) ħ-b-w ḥbā "to crawl"
| | | perfective (Past) | | imperfective (Present) | |
| | | singular | plural | singular | plural |
|---|---|---|---|---|---|
| 1st person | | ḥbīt حبيت | ḥbūnā حبونا | niḥbū نحبو | niḥbāū نحباوا |
| 2nd person | | ḥbīt حبيت | ḥbītū حبيتوا | taḥbū تحبو | taḥbāū تحباوا |
| 3rd | masculine | ḥbā حبا | ḥbāū حباوا | yaḥbū يحبو | yaḥbāū يحباوا |
| 3rd | feminine | ḥbāt حبات | ḥbāū حباوا | taḥbū تحبو | yaḥbāū يحباوا |

[ʔ] as a third letter of the root b-d-ʔ bdā "to begin"
| | | perfective (Past) | | imperfective (Present) | |
| | | singular | plural | singular | plural |
|---|---|---|---|---|---|
| 1st person | | bdīt بديت | bdīnā بدينا | nibdā نبدا | nibdāū نبداوا |
| 2nd person | | bdīt بديت | bdītūبديتوا | tibdā تبدا | tibdāū تبداوا |
| 3rd | masculine | bdā بدا | bdāū بداوا | yibdā يبدا | yibdāū يبداوا |
| 3rd | feminine | bdāt بدات | bdāū بداوا | tibdā تبدا | yibdāū يبداوا |

[ʔ] as a first letter of the root ʔ-χ-ð xđā "to take"
| | | perfective (Past) | | imperfective (Present) | |
| | | singular | plural | singular | plural |
|---|---|---|---|---|---|
| 1st person | | xđīt خذيت | xđīnā خذينا | nāxđ ناخذ | nāxđū ناخذوا |
| 2nd person | | xđīt خذيت | xđītū خذيتوا | tāxđ تاخذ | tāxđū تاخذوا |
| 3rd | masculine | xđā ٰخذا | xđāū خذاوا | yāxđ ياخذ | yāxđū ياخذوا |
| 3rd | feminine | xđāt خذات | xđāū خذاوا | tāxđ تاخذ | yāxđū ياخذوا |

==== Irregular verbs ====
| Pronoun | ɛandū "to have" | ḥājtū "to need" |
|---|---|---|
| ānā آنا | ɛandī عندي | ḥājtī حاجتي |
| intī إنتِي | ɛandik عندك | ḥājtik حاجتك |
| hūwa هوة | ɛandū عنده | ḥājtū حاجته |
| hīya هية | ɛandhā عندها | ḥājthā حاجتها |
| aḥnā أحنا | ɛandnā عندنا | ḥājtnā حاجتنا |
| intūmā إنتوما | ɛandkum عندكم | ḥājtkum حاجتكم |
| hūma هومة | ɛandhum عندهم | ḥājthum حاجتهم |

=== Future tense ===
The future tense in Tunisian Arabic is also similar to Berber, more precisely Zenata Berber that was spoken by the majority of Tunisians' ancestors:

- باش bāš + verb → "will" + verb (ex: باش تتكسّر /baːʃ titkassir/ → it will break)
- ماش māš or باش bāš + verb → "will" + verb (ex: ماش نكسّرها /maːʃ nkassirha/ → I will break it)

Taw or Tawwa can be used as a time indicator with a verb in present to mean "being going to do something".

=== Imperative tense ===
The imperative form is considered the stem for the present tense.

| Singular | Plural |
|---|---|
| ušrub اُشْرُبْ | ušrbū اُشْرْبوا |
| aɛṭī اَعْطي | aɛṭīū اَعْطِيوا |

== Conditional tenses ==
=== Conditional present ===
The conditional present is conjugated as Kaṛū or Ḥaqqū + Verb in Present tense. This tense is generally used to show regret.

| Pronoun | Auxiliary Verbs | |
|---|---|---|
| ānā آنا | kāṛnī كارني | ḥaqqnī حقّني |
| intī إنتِي | kāṛik كارك | ḥaqqik حقّك |
| hūwa هوة | kāṛū كاره | ḥaqqū حقّه |
| hīya هية | kāṛhā كارها | ḥaqqhā حقّها |
| aḥnā أحنا | kāṛnā كارنا | ḥaqqnā حقّنا |
| intūmā إنتوما | kāṛkum كاركم | ḥaqqkum حقّكم |
| hūma هومة | kāṛhum كارهم | ḥaqqhum حقّهم |

=== Conditional past ===
==== I should have done something ====
For the past conditional, the same structures seen above are used, but instead of the present tense, the past tense is used.

==== I could have done something ====
This structure is conjugated as kān ynajjam + Verb in the present tense.

| Pronoun | Auxiliary Verb |
|---|---|
| ānā آنا | kunt nnajjam كنت نّجّم |
| intī إنتي | kunt tnajjam كنت تنجّم |
| hūwa هوة | kān ynajjam كان ينجّم |
| hīya هية | kānit tnajjam كانت تنجّم |
| aḥnā أحنا | kunnā nnajjmū كنّا نّجّموا |
| intūmā إنتوما | kuntū tnajjmū كنتوا تنجّموا |
| hūma هومة | kānū ynajjmū كانوا ينجّموا |

==== I would have done something ====
This structure is conjugated as ṛāhū + Verb in the present tense.

== Verb derivation ==
Verb derivation is done by adding prefixes or by doubling consonants to the simple verb having the root fɛal (Triconsonantal) or faɛlil (Quadriconsonantal). The verb's root determines the possible derivations. Generally, the patterns used in Verb Derivation are the same as in Standard Arabic.

=== Triconsonantal verbs ===
- Causative: is obtained by doubling consonants :

خرج /χraʒ/ "to go out" → خرّج /χarraʒ/ "to take out"
دخل /dχal/ "to enter" → دخّل /daχχal/ "to bring in, to introduce"

- Adding ā between the first two radical consonants, e.g. xālaṭ "to frequent"
- Inchoative: Adding ā between the last two radical consonants, e.g. ḥmār "turn red"
- Passive: This derivation is influenced by Berber and is different from the one of Classical Arabic (the passive voice in classical Arabic uses vowel changes and not verb derivation), it is obtained by prefixing the verb with /t-/ (First letter in the root as Moon Consonant), /tt-/ (First letter in the root as Sun Consonant), /tn-/ (can efficiently substitute tt- when the verb is conjugated in Present Tense) or /n-/ (can efficiently substitute t- when the verb is conjugated in Present Tense):

قتل /qtal/ "to kill" → تقتل /taqtal/ "to be killed"
شرب /ʃrab/ "to drink" → تّشرب /ttaʃrab/ "to be drunk".

- Prefixing ist– to the verb, e.g. istaxbar "to get informed"
- Prefixing i- to the verb and Infixing t after the first radical consonant, e.g. اجتمع ijtmaɛ "to assemble"

=== Quadriconsonantal verbs ===
- Prefixing it– to the verb, e.g. اتفركس itfarkis "to be searched"

== Verb forms ==
=== Exclamative form ===
The exclamative form can be formed by the intonation and in this particular situation, the sentence ends with an exclamation mark to distinguish it from an affirmative sentence Furthermore, it can be formed using Qaddāš + Noun or Possessive Pronoun + Adjective or Imperfective verb + !.

=== Interrogative form ===
The interrogative form can be formed by two methods: The intonation and the Suffix -š. When an interrogative adverb or pronoun exists, the question is an āš question that is equivalent to the English wh question and if the question does not involve any interrogative adverb or pronoun, it is an īh/lā question that is equivalent to the English Yes/No Question.

- The Intonation: Which is a variation of the spoken pitch to distinguish a question from an affirmative sentence. In writing, a question mark is used after an affirmative sentence to transform it into an interrogative sentence.

Example: تحبّ تمشي لتونس tḥibb timšī l- tūnis?, Do you want to go to Tunisia?

- The Suffix -š: -š or -šī can be suffixed to the verb to indicate an interrogative sentence.

Example: تعرفوشي؟ taɛṛfūšī?, Do you know him?

=== Negative form ===
- With verbs conjugated in the present, past and conditional tenses:

To make the negative form, we put me in front of the verb and š at the end of the verb.
Example: ما فهمش الدرس mā fhimš id-dars, He didn't understand the lesson.
N.B.: With the past conditional (would have) this negative form is used with the main verb.
Example: لوكان عرفت راني ما جيتش lūkān ɛṛaft rānī mā jītš, If I knew I would not have come.

- With The Future And Present Participle:

To negate the present participles and the verbs conjugated in the future, mūš, or its conjugated form, is added in front of the verb.
Example: موش باش نشوفه الجمعة هاذي mūš bāš nšūfū ij-jumɛa hāđī, I won't see him this week.
موش mūš is conjugated as follows:

| Pronoun | Auxiliary Verb |
|---|---|
| ānā آنا | mānīš مانيش |
| intī إنتي | mākiš ماكش |
| hūwa هوة | māhūš ماهوش |
| hīya هية | māhīš ماهيش |
| aḥnā أحنا | mānāš مناش |
| intūmā انتوما | mākumš مكمش |
| hūmā هومة | māhumš مهمش |

== Relative clause ==
The only relative pronoun used in Tunisian Arabic is illī meaning who or that and its short form is lī.

== Nouns ==
=== Gender ===
==== Masculine gender ====
Nouns ending either in a consonant, u, i, ū or ī are usually masculine. For example: باب bāb "door", كرسي kursī "chair". There are, however, some exceptions. Indeed, some consonant-final and some ī-final nouns are in the feminine gender (usually, names of countries and cities, and names of parts of the body, and nouns ending in –t are in the feminine). For example: پاريز Pārīz "Paris", بيت bīt "room", بسكلات bisklāt "bicycle".

==== Uninflected feminine gender ====
Nouns ending with a or ā vowel are usually in the feminine.

For example: سنّة sinna "tooth", خريطة xarīṭa "map".

There are, however, a few exceptions: أعمى aɛmā "blind man", ممشى mamšā "alley", عشاء ɛšā "dinner".

==== Inflected feminine gender ====
- Feminization: Generally, male nouns form their feminine by the suffixation of a vowel. For example, كلب kalb > كلبة kalba, جدّ jadd > جدّة jadda, بطل bṭal > بطلة baṭla. Some male nouns, however, do not form their feminine by the suffixation of a, but have suppletive female counterparts. For example, راجل rājel > مرا mra, ولد wlad > طفلة ṭufla, بو bū > أمّ umm.
- Individual singular of collective plural and mass nouns: Similarly, collective plural and mass nouns form their feminine by the suffixation of a. For example, زيتون zītūn "olive" > زيتونة zītūna "an olive", تمر tmar "dates" > تمرة tamra "a date".
- Individual singular of verbal nouns: Generally, verbal nouns form their individual singulars by the suffixation of a. For example, بني bany > بنية banya, تفركيس tfarkīs > تفركيسة tfarkīsa.

=== The dual ===
Marking of the dual for nouns by adding -īn as a suffix to them is only used for quantity measures, for nouns having the CCVC form such as C is an ungeminated consonant and V is a short vowel and things often occurring in twos (e.g. eyes, hands, parents). In general, these nouns have broken plurals and not regular ones. Marking of the dual is also done by writing zūz before the regular or irregular plural noun. For example:

- صبع sbūɛ (finger) becomes صبعين sūbɛīn
- ليل līl (night) becomes زوز ليالي zūz lyālī

=== The plural ===
The plural in Tunisian can be classified according to its structure. There are mainly two types of structure: suffixed structure and internal structure. However and as reported in many studies, the rate of broken plurals for Tunisian and by that the rate of the use of the Pluralization Internal Structure is more important than the one for Standard Arabic and several other Arabic dialects. This considerable use of the Internal Structure of Pluralization is considered by most linguists as an influence of the Berber substratum.

Using the Suffixed Structure, Singular nouns may form their plural by the suffixation of any of the following plural suffixes:

| Word end | Suffix |
|---|---|
| -uw, a vowel or a consonant | –āt |
| -iy | –īn |

This kind of plural is considered as regular plurals. However, There is a suffixed structure which is considered as a broken plural which is the plural of name of the noun constituted of the name of a town or a group of people and the suffix ī. This structure is done to attribute the person to a group or a city and its plural is obtained by adding ā after the second letter of the root and adding a as a suffix in the end of the word.

Using the Internal Structure, the plural in Tunisian follows the following patterns such as C is an ungeminated consonant, V is a short vowel, C: is a geminated consonant:

| Singular pattern | Plural pattern |
|---|---|
| CūC | CCāCī |
| CāC | CīCān |
| CaCCaC | CaCāCiC |
| CCaC^{5} | CCūCāt |
| CaCC^{5} | CCāC |
| CCāC | CCuC |
| CiCC | CCūC |
| CVCCVC or CVCCVCa | CCāCiC |
| CāCiC or CaCC^{5} | CCūC |
| CāCiC^{5} | CVC:āC |
| CVCC^{5} | CCūCa |
| CiCCa | CCiC |
| CCaC^{5} | uCCCa |
| CaCCa | CCaC |

^5 CaCC, CCaC and CāCiC could have multiple patterns as plural noun patterns. The criterion of the choice of the plural form for CaCC, CCaC and CāCiC is still not known.

== Adjectives ==
=== Gender ===
==== Masculine ====
Uninflected adjectives are masculine singular. There are two main types of adjectives:

- Participial adjectives: Participles, whether real or historical, may function both as adjectives and nouns.

E.g. متغشّش mtġaššaš "angry".

- Other adjectives: These include any non-participial adjectives.

E.g. طويل ṭwīl "tall".

==== Feminine ====
Like participles and some nouns, adjectives form their feminine by the suffixation of a. For example, جيعان jīɛān > جيعانة jīɛāna "hungry", سخون sxūn > سخونة sxūna "hot".

In some cases, when the adjective ends with an i vowel, the i becomes a y. E.g. باهي bāhi > باهية bāhya Some uninflected adjectives are in the feminine. Their masculine counterparts are either suppletive or do not exist.

For example: حبلة ḥibla "pregnant", عزوزة ɛzūza "old woman".

The masculine counterpart of عزوزة ɛzūza is شايب šāyib, though, عزوز ɛzūz exists in some idiolects.

Some adjectives cannot be inflected either for gender or number. E.g. وردي wardi "pink", حموم ḥmūm "disastrous".

=== Number ===
Unlike nouns, adjectives are not inflected for dual. The plural is used instead. Like nouns, there are two main types of structure: suffixed structure and internal structure.

- Suffixed Structure: There are two types of plural suffixes which can be suffixed to a singular adjective: –īn (when the adjective finishes with an i+Consonant) and –a (for all other situations excepting the ones having an internal form).
- Internal Structure: Generally, adjective's plural follows the following structures: CCāC (for CCīC, CCūC, CVCCūn and CVC: as singular patterns), CuCCā (for CCīC and CCiy as singular patterns), CCāCiC (for CVCâC, CVC:ūC, CCV:CV, CVCCV:C as singular patterns), CCuC (for CCīC, aCCā and aCCaC as singular patterns), CCaC (for CaCCī as a singular pattern), CCāCa (for CCīC and CVCCV as singular patterns and for adjectives finishing by an ān), CCī (for aCCaC and aCCā as singular patterns), CuCCān (for CuCāC as a singular pattern), CCaC:Ca (for CaCCūC as a singular pattern), CVC:āC (for CāCiC as a singular pattern), CūCa (for CīC as a singular pattern) and CCāCCa (for CVCCV:C as a singular pattern and for adjectives finishing by an ī).

== Adjective forms ==
=== Comparative form ===
The comparative of superiority: The comparative form is the same whether the adjective is feminine or masculine.

- Adjectives composed of 3 consonants with a full vowel on the second The comparative form is formed by adding a before the adjective and by replacing the full vowel with a breve vowel, plus min after the adjective. E.g. كبير kbīr > أكبر من akbar min "bigger than"
- Adjectives ending with a vowel The comparative is formed by adding a as a prefix, and replacing the final vowel with ā. When the first syllable of the adjective has a long vowel, this vowel is removed. E.g. عالي ɛālī > أعلى aɛlā min "higher than".

The comparative of inferiority: It's formed by the following structure: أقلّ aqall + noun + من min. For example, هي أقلّ طول من خوها hīya aqall ṭūl min xūha "she's less tall than her brother"

The comparative of equality: It is formed by using the following structure: noun (subject) + فرد fard + (comparative) noun + personal pronoun + و w + noun (compared). For example, فاطمة فرد طول هي و خوها Fāṭma fard ṭūl hīya w xūha "Fatma is as tall as her brother". This structure can be simplified as follows: noun + و w + noun + فرد fard + noun. For example, فاطمة و خوها فرد طول Fāṭma w xūha fard ṭūl "Fatma is as tall as her brother"

=== Superlative form ===
It is formed by adding واحد wāḥid (m.), واحدة waḥda (f.) or وحود wḥūd (pl.) after the comparative of superiority.

== Proportion in Tunisian Arabic ==
In order to denote the proportion of the participants in the given action from a greater community, the adjectives and adverbs of proportion shown here are used.

- کل kull (adj.) "Every"
- جمیع or معا بعضنا jmīɛ (adj.) or mɛā bɛaḑnā (adv.) "Together"
- بعض or شويّة baɛḑ or šwayya (adj.) "Some"
- فرد fard (adj.) "Same"
- وحد waḥd with possessive pronoun (adv.) "Alone"

== Numerals ==
=== Cardinals ===
- Cardinal numbers: The transcription of cardinal numbers is the same as in English and some other European languages. The number is read from left to right. This table provides several examples of names of cardinals in Tunisian Arabic and can give a better overview about this fact.

| Cardinal | Tunisian Arabic |
|---|---|
| 0 | ṣfir صفر |
| 1 | wāḥid واحد |
| 2 | iŧnīn or zūz اثنين or زوز |
| 3 | ŧlāŧa ثلاثة |
| 4 | arbɛa أربعة |
| 5 | xamsa خمسة |
| 6 | sitta ستّة |
| 7 | sabɛa سبعة |
| 8 | ŧmanya ثمانية |
| 9 | tisɛa تسعة |
| 10 | ɛacra عشرة |
| 11 | ḥdāc احداش |
| 12 | ŧnāc اثناش |
| 13 | ŧluṭṭāc ثلظّاش |
| 14 | arbaɛṭāc اربعطاش |
| 15 | xumsṭāc خمسطاش |
| 16 | sutṭāc سطّاش |
| 17 | sbaɛṭāc سبعطاش |
| 18 | ŧmanṭāc ثمنطاش |
| 19 | tsaɛṭāc تسعطاش |
| 20 | ɛicrīn عشرين |
| 21 | wāḥid w ɛicrīn واحد وعشرين |
| 30 | ŧlāŧīn ثلاثين |
| 40 | arbɛīn أربعين |
| 50 | xamsīn خمسين |
| 60 | sittīn ستّين |
| 70 | sabɛīn سبعين |
| 80 | ŧmanīn ثمانين |
| 90 | tisɛīn تسعين |
| 100 | mya مية |
| 101 | mya w wāḥid مية وواحد |
| 110 | mya w ɛacra مية وعشرة |
| 200 | mītīn ميتين |
| 300 | ŧlāŧamya ثلاثة مية |
| 1000 | alf الف |
| 1956 | alf w tisɛamya w sitta w xamsīn الف وتسعة مية وستّة وخمسين |
| 2000 | alfīn الفين |
| 10000 | ɛacra lāf عشرة الاف |
| 100000 | myat elf مية الف |
| 1000000 | malyūn مليون |
| 123456789 | mya w ŧlāŧa w ɛicrīn malyūn w arbɛa mya w sitta w xamsīn alf w sabɛa mya w tisɛa w ŧmanīn مية وثلاثة وعشرين مليون وأربعة مية وستّة وخمسين الف وسبعة ميه وتسعة وثمانين |
| 1000000000 | milyār مليار |

- Nouns following a cardinal number:
  - Number one is generally not used with the single object counted unless we want to emphasize that there is only a single thing. E.g. طاولة ṭāwla "a table", طاولة واحدة ṭāwla waḥda "one table".
  - For the number two, we use the dual of the noun or we use زوز zūz plus the plural of the noun.
  - From 3 to 10, we use the number plus the plural of the noun. E.g. خمسة كتب xamsa ktub "five books".
  - From 11 to 19, we use the number to which we add the consonant n plus the noun in singular. E.g. سبعطاش كتاب sbaɛţācn ktāb "17 books".
  - From 20 to 99, we use the number plus the singular. E.g. ثمانين دينار ŧmānīn dinār "80 Dinars"
  - For numbers ending with a like مية mya, an –at is suffixed to it when used with a noun. E.g. مية دولار myāt dolār "100 dollars".
  - For the other numbers, we use the number plus the singular. E.g. الف ميترو alf mītrū "1000 meters".
  - Number zero is generally expressed as حتّى ḥatta + noun. E.g. حتّى كرهبة ḥatta karhba "zero cars".

=== Days of the week ===
| Standard English | Tunisian Arabic |
|---|---|
| Monday | il-iŧnīn الإثنين |
| Tuesday | iŧ-ŧlāŧ الثلاث |
| Wednesday | il-irbɛa الإربعة |
| Thursday | il-xmīs الخميس |
| Friday | ij-jimɛa الجمعة |
| Saturday | is-sibt السبت |
| Sunday | il-aḥadd الأحدّ |

=== Months of the year ===
| Standard English | Tunisian Arabic |
|---|---|
| January | Jānfī جانفي |
| February | Fīvrī فيڥري |
| March | Mārs مارس |
| April | Avrīl أڥريل |
| May | Māy ماي |
| June | Jwān جوان |
| July | Jwīlya جويلية |
| August | Ūt أوت |
| September | Siptumbir سپتمبر |
| October | Uktobir أكتوبر |
| November | Nūvumbir نوڥمبر |
| December | Dīsumbir ديسمبر |

Note, that in this case, the modern months are a tunisification of the name of the months from French, inherited from the protectorate times. The native names of the months were that of their original Latin names, following the berber calendar:

| Standard English | Tunisian Arabic |
|---|---|
| January | Yennā(ye)r ينار، يناير |
| February | Fūrā(ye)r فورار، فورسير |
| March | Mārsū مارسو |
| April | Abrīl أبريل |
| May | Māyū مايو |
| June | Yūnyū يونيو |
| July | Yūlyū يوليو |
| August | Awūsū أووسو |
| September | Shtamber شتمبر |
| October | Uktūber أكتوبر |
| November | Nūfember نوفمبر |
| December | Dejember دجمبر |

=== Ordinals ===
The ordinals in Tunisian are from one to twelve only, in case of higher numbers, the cardinals are used.

| English Ordinals | Masculine | Feminine | Plural |
|---|---|---|---|
| First | أول uwwil or أولاني ūlānī | أولى ūlā or أولانية ūlānīya | أولين ūlīn or أولانين ūlānīn |
| Second | ثاني ŧāni | ثانية ŧānya | ثانين ŧānīn |
| Third | ثالت ŧāliŧ | ثالتة ŧālŧa | ثالتين ŧālŧīn |
| Fourth | رابع rābiɛ | رابعة rābɛa | رابعين rābɛīn |
| Fifth | خامس xāmis | خامسة xāmsa | خامسين xāmsīn |
| Sixth | سادس sādis | سادسة sādsa | سادسين sādsīn |
| Seventh | سابع sābiɛ | سابعة sābɛa | سابعين sābɛīn |
| Eighth | ثامن ŧāmin | ثامنة ŧāmna | ثامنين ŧāmnīn |
| Ninth | تاسع tāsiɛ | تاسعة tāsɛa | تاسعين tāsɛīn |
| Tenth | عاشر ɛāšir | عاشرة ɛāšra | عاشرين ɛāšrīn |
| Eleventh | حادش ḥādiš | حادشة ḥādša | حادشين ḥādšīn |
| Twelfth | ثانش ŧāniš | ثانشة ŧānšā | ثانشين ŧānšīn |

=== Fractions ===
There are special forms for fractions from two to ten only, elsewhere percentage is used. The Fractions can be used for various purposes like the expression of proportion and the expression of time... For example, the expression of 11:20 in Tunisian Arabic is il-ḥdāc w ŧluŧ and the expression of 11:40 in Tunisian Arabic is nuṣṣ il-nhār ġīr ŧluŧ. Similarly, midnight is nuṣṣ il-līl and noon is nuṣṣ il-nhār.

| Standard English | Tunisian Arabic |
|---|---|
| one half | نصف nuṣf or نصّ nuṣṣ |
| one third | ثلث ŧluŧ |
| one quarter | ربع rbuɛ |
| one fifth | خمس xmus |
| one sixth | سدس sdus |
| one seventh | سبع sbuɛ |
| one eighth | ثمن ŧmun |
| one ninth | تسع tsuɛ |
| one tenth | عشر ɛšur |

=== Time measurement during the day ===
As said above, time measurement method and vocabulary below 1 hour is very peculiar in Tunisian and is not found in neither the other dialects of Maghrebi Arabic or standard Arabic. Indeed, Tunisian, uses fractions of 1 hour and a special unit of 5 minutes called دراج "drāj", to express time. Also, as in English as "it's 3 am/pm" or just "it's 3" and contrary to other languages such as standard Arabic, Tunisian do not precise the word "sāɛa (hour)" when expressing the time of the day as the subject is considered implied. Below is the list of the vocabulary used for time indication:

| Standard English | Tunisian Arabic |
|---|---|
| 1 second | ثانية ŧānya or سيڨوندة sīgūnda |
| 1 minute | دقيقة dqīqa |
| 5 minutes | درج draj |
| 15 minutes | ربع rbuɛ |
| 20 minutes | ثلث ŧluŧ or أربعة دراج arbɛa drāj |
| 30 minutes | نصّ nuṣṣ |

=== Basic measures ===
The Basic units for Tunisian Arabic are used in the same way as in English.

| Standard English | Tunisian Arabic |
|---|---|
| Three | kānūn كانون |
| Four | ḥāra حارة |
| Five | ɛiddat īdik عدّة إيدك |
| Twelve | ṭuzzīna طزّينة |
| One centimeter | ṣāntī صانتي |
| One meter | mītrū ميترو |
| One deciliter | ɛšūrīya عشورية |
| Two deciliters | xmūsīya خموسية |
| A quarter of a litre (fluid) | rbuɛ ītra ربع إيترة |
| One litre | ītra إيترة |
| Ten litres (fluid) | dīga ديڨة |
| Ten liters (mass) | galba ڨلبة |
| Twenty liters (mass) | wība ويبة |
| Three grams | ūqīya أوقية |
| One pound | rṭal رطل |
| One kilogram | kīlū كيلو |
| One ton | ṭurnāṭa طرناطة |
| One second | ŧānya or sīgūnda ثانية or سيڨوندة |
| One minute | dqīqa دقيقة |
| Five minutes | draj درج |
| One hour | sāɛa ساعة |
| One day | nhar نهار |
| One week | jumɛa جمعة |
| One month | šhar شهر |
| One year | ɛām عام |
| One century | qarn قرن |

The measure units are accorded when in dual or in plural, for example:

- dqīqa becomes دقيقتين dqīqtīn (2 minutes) in dual
- sāɛa becomes سوايع swāyaɛ (hours) in plural

== Prepositions ==
There are two types of prepositions: single (commonly used) and compound prepositions (rarely used).

=== Single prepositions ===
| Standard English | Tunisian Arabic |
|---|---|
| In | في fi- (fī before indefinite nouns or prepositions) |
| With | بـ b- |
| To (Place, Person) | لـ l- |
| From | مـ m- (من min before indefinite nouns or prepositions) |
| At | عند ɛand |
| With | معا mɛā |
| On, About | عـ ɛa- (على ɛlā before indefinite nouns or prepositions) |
| Between | بين bīn |
| Before | قبل qbal |
| After | بعد baɛd |
| Behind | ورا wrā |
| Over | فوق fūq |
| Under | تحت taḥt |
| In the middle of | وسط wusṭ |
| Inside | فسط fusṭ |
| Like | كـ ki- (kīf before indefinite nouns or prepositions) |
| As much as, as big as ... | قدّ qadd |
| Without | بلاش blāš |
| Even | حتّى ḥattā |
| Round | جيهة jīhit, شيرة šīrit |
| In front of | قدّام quddām |
| Of | متاع mtāɛ |
| About (number, quantity, distance) | مدوار madwār |
| Approximatively | تقريب taqrīb |

=== Compound prepositions ===
Compound prepositions are the prepositions that are obtained through the succession of two single prepositions. وسط Wusṭ, جيهة jīhit, شيرة šīrit and متاع mtāɛ can be used as second prepositions with any single preposition before it excepting وسط Wusṭ, جيهة jīhit, شيرة šīrit and متاع mtāɛ. The other prepositions are: من بين min bīn, من بعد min baɛd, من عند min ɛand, من تحت min taḥt, من قبل min qbal, من فوق min fūq, من ورا min wrā, كيف بعد kīf baɛd, كيف عند kīf ɛand, كيف تحت kīf taḥt, كيف قبل kīf qbal, كيف فوق kīf fūq, كيف ورا kīf wrā, كيف معا kīf mɛā, قبل فوق qbal fūq, على فوق ɛlā fūq, بتحت b- taḥt, في تحت fī taḥt, ببلاش b- blāš, من قدّام min quddām and حتّى قدّام ḥattā quddām.

== Conjunctions ==
=== Coordinate conjunctions ===
Coordinate conjunctions link verbs, adverbs, nouns, pronouns, clauses, phrases and sentences of the same structure.

| Standard English | Tunisian Arabic |
|---|---|
| And | w و |
| Or | w illā... wallā وإلّا.. ولّا |
| Either ... or | ammā ... w illā/wallā أمّا و إلّا\ولّا |
| But | lākin لكن, amā أما |
| Without | min/mā ğīr mā من\ما غير ما |
| Only | mā ... kān ما.. كان |
| The contrary of | ɛaks min/mā عكس من\ما |
| And then | hāk il-sāɛa هاك الساعة, sāɛathā ساعتها, waqthā وقتها, w iđā bīh و إذا بيه |
| In brief | il-ḥāṣil الحاصل, il-ḥaṣīlū الحصيلو |
| Sometimes ... sometimes | marra ... marra مرّة.. مرّة, sāɛa ... sāɛa ساعة.. ساعة, sāɛāt ساعات |
| As far as | qadd mā قدّ ما, qadd قدّ |
| Before | qbal قبل |
| Otherwise | kānšī |
| Moreover, Besides | bāra min hak |
| Consequently | ɛal hak |
| In addition | lī zāda |
| Instead | lī ɛāwiđ |
| Overall | f- il-kul |
| Above all else | min fuq hāđa il-kul |
| Anyway | kul f- il-kul |
| Also | zāda |

=== Subordinate conjunctions ===
Subordinate conjunctions introduce dependent clauses only. There two types of conjunctions: single and compound. The compound conjunctions mainly consist of prepositions that are compound with illī. The main Subordinate conjunctions for Tunisian are Waqt illī وقت اللي "When", m- illī ماللي "Since", qbal mā قبل ما "Before", īđā إذا "If", lūkān لوكان "If", mā ما "what", bāš باش "In order to", (ɛlā) xāṭir على) خاطر) "because", (ɛlā) ḥasb mā على) حسب ما) "According to".

== Adverbs ==
Adverbs can be subdivided into three subgroups: single, compound and interrogative.

=== Single adverbs ===
- Adverbs of time:
  - tawwa توة Now
  - taww تو A moment ago
  - dīmā ديما Always
  - bikrī بكري Early
  - fīsaɛ فيسع Fast, quickly
  - māzāl مازال Still
- Adverbs of place:
  - hnā هنا Here
  - ġādī غادي There
- Adverbs of manner:
  - hakka هكة Like this
  - hakkāka, hakkīka هكاكة، هكيكة Like that
- Adverbs of measure:
  - barša برشة Much, very
  - šwayya شوية Little
  - yāsir ياسر Very, much
  - taqrīb تقريب About
  - bark برك Only

=== Compound adverbs ===
- Adverbs of time:
  - taww taww تو تو Here and now / Immediately
  - min baɛd من تو Afterwards
  - min bikrī من بكري A moment ago
  - min tawwa من توة From now on
- Adverbs of place:
  - l- fūq لفوق On (Up)
  - l- il-ūṭa لأوطى Bellow
  - id- dāxil لداخل In
  - l- barra لبرة Out
  - l- quddām لقدام Upwards
  - it- tālī لتالي Backwards
  - min hūnī من هوني From here
  - min ġādī من غادي From there
- Adverbs of manner:
  - b- is-sīf بالسيف Forcibly
  - b- is-syāsa بالسياسة gently
  - b- il-ɛānī بالعاني Purposely
  - b- iš-šwaya بالشوية Slowly
  - b- iz-zarba بالزربة Rapidly
- Adverbs of measure:
  - ɛa- il-aqall عالاقل At least

=== Interrogative adverbs ===
- Adverbs of the time:
  - waqtāš وقتاش When
  - nhārāš نهاراش Which day
  - ɛāmāš عاماش Which year
- Adverbs of place:
  - wīn, fīn وين، فين Where
  - l- wīn لوين Where to
  - min wīn, mnīn من وين، منين Where from
- Adverbs of manner:
  - kīfāš كيفاش How
- Adverbs of measure:
  - qaddāš قداش How much

== Nouns derived from verbs ==
The nouns derived from verbs are the Active Participle, the Passive Participle and the Verbal Noun.

=== Participles ===
- Active Participle: The Active Participle is the noun used to call the person or the object who/that did the action. It can be used as a subject and an adjective.
  - They are obtained for the simple verb having the root fɛal or faɛlil by adding ā between the first and the second letters of the root and changing the vowel between the last but one and the last letters of the root into i. For example, ɛāzif عازف is instrument player in Tunisian and is obtained from the verb ɛzaf عزف.
  - They are obtained for the derived verbs by adding m as a prefix and changing the vowel between the last but one and the last letters of the root into i. For example, mšērik مشارك is a participant in Tunisian and is obtained from the verb šērik شارك.
- Passive Participle: The Passive Participle is the noun used to call the person or the object who/that received the action. It can be used as a subject and an adjective.
  - They are obtained for the simple verb having the root fɛal or faɛlil by adding ma as a prefix and changing the vowel between the last but one and the last letters of the root into ū. For example, maɛzūfa معزوفة is a musical composition in Tunisian and is obtained from the verb ɛzaf عزف.
  - They are obtained for the derived verbs by adding m as a prefix and changing the vowel between the last but one and the last letters of the root into a. For example, mhaddad مهدد is threatened person in Tunisian and is derived from the verb haddad هدد.

=== Verbal noun ===
The verbal noun is the noun that indicates the done action itself. Its form is known through the pattern and root of the verb from which it is derived or rather the pattern of its singular imperative conjugation.

- Simple Verb:
  - CiCC or Triconsonantal Verb: According to the root
    - Regular: CiCC or CiCCa
    - ʔ-C-C: māCCa
    - C-C-ʔ: CCāya
    - C-C-j: CiCy, CiCyān or CiCya
    - C-w-C: CawCān
    - C-C_{1}-C_{1}: CaC_{1}C_{1}ān
  - CaCCiC or Quadriconsonantal Verb: CaCCCa
- Derived Verb: According to the pattern
  - Regular: Verbal nouns for all regular derived verbs is obtained through the addition of ā between the last and the last but one letter of the root.
  - Irregular:
    - Doubling the second letter of the root: taCCīC
    - Adding t as a prefix and doubling the second letter of the root: tCaC_{1}C_{1}uC_{2}
    - Adding t as a prefix and ā between the first and the second letter of the root: tCāCuC
    - Adding i as a prefix and t between the first and second letter of the root: iCtCāC

== See also ==
Help: IPA for Tunisian Arabic
