= Dan Sayre Groesbeck =

American muralist and illustrator

- Born: September 8, 1878; California, U.S.
- Died: August 29, 1950 (aged 71); Los Angeles, California, U.S.
- Occupations: Muralist, illustrator

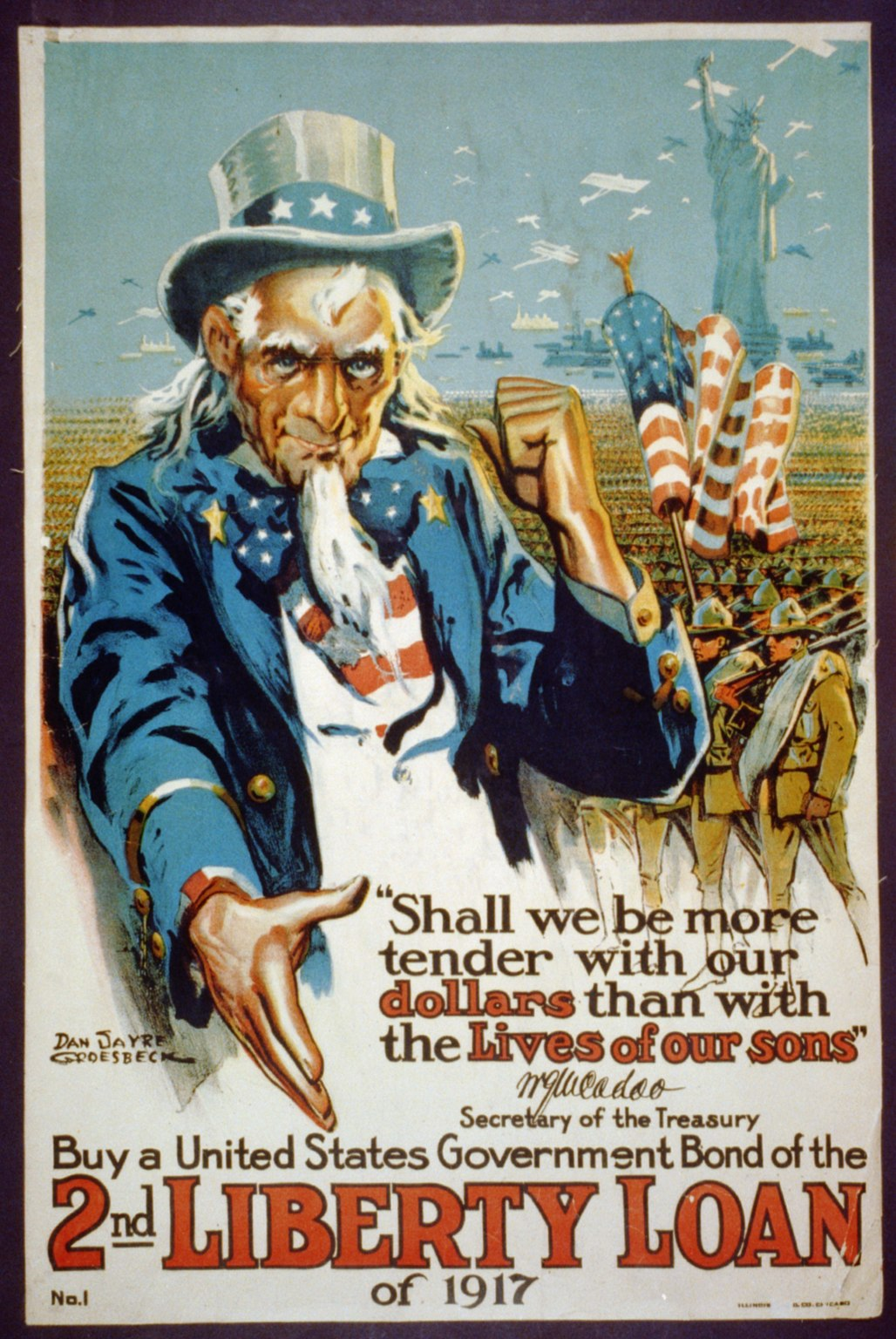
Buy a United States government bond of the 2nd Liberty Loan of 1917, designed by Groesbeck.

Dan Sayre Groesbeck (September 8, 1878 - August 29, 1950) was an American illustrator, muralist, and concept artist.

== Life ==
Groesbeck was born on September 8, 1878, in California.

Groesbeck began his career as a reporter and illustrator in Los Angeles, and later in Denver and Chicago. His illustrations were published in the Chicago Tribune, Redbook, and Cosmopolitan Magazine.

Groesbeck painted murals inside the Santa Barbara County Courthouse, the Hotel Del Monte, and various other buildings. He designed "visualization sketches" for the films of producer-director Cecil B. DeMille.

Groesbeck died on August 29, 1950, in Los Angeles, at age 71.
