= Untamed =

Untamed may refer to:

== Books ==
- Untamed, a 1993 novel by Elizabeth Lowell
- Untamed (Cast novel), by P. C. Cast and Kristin Cast
- Untamed (Humphreys novel), 2012 book by Sara Humphreys
- Untamed (memoir), a 2020 memoir by Glennon Doyle

== Film and TV ==
- Untamed (1929 film), featuring Joan Crawford and Robert Montgomery
- Untamed (1940 film), with Ray Milland
- Untamed (1955 film), starring Tyrone Power and Susan Hayward
- Untamed (1957 film), Japanese film directed by Mikio Naruse
- The Untamed, British title of the film The Man from Snowy River II
- The Untamed (1920 film), silent American film
- The Untamed (2016 film), a Mexican film
- The Untamed (TV series), a 2019 Chinese TV series
- Untamed (TV series), a 2025 American TV series

== Music ==
- Untamed (Cam album), 2015
- Untamed (Heather Myles album), 1995
- Untamed (Yankee Grey album), 1999
- "Untamed", a song by Gavin DeGraw from his 2008 album Gavin DeGraw

== Other uses ==
- Untamed (Canobie Lake Park), a steel roller coaster in Canobie Lake Park in Salem, New Hampshire
- Untamed (Walibi Holland), a Rocky Mountain Construction hybrid steel-wood roller coaster
- HMS Untamed, a 1942 Royal Navy U-class submarine
- MX vs. ATV Untamed, a 2007 racing video game
