= Mantrap (novel) =

1926 novel by Sinclair Lewis

- First edition cover
- Author: Sinclair Lewis
- Language: English
- Genre: Fiction
- Publisher: Harcourt, Brace & Company
- Publication date: June 3, 1926
- Publication place: United States
- Media type: Hardcover
- Pages: 307
- Preceded by: Arrowsmith
- Followed by: Elmer Gantry

Mantrap is a 1926 novel by Sinclair Lewis. One of Lewis's two unsuccessful novels of the 1920s, the other being The Man Who Knew Coolidge. Mantrap is the story of New York lawyer Ralph Prescott's journey into the wilds of Saskatchewan, and of his adventures there. The novel spawned two separate film adaptations, Mantrap (1926), and Untamed (1940).

The novel was dedicated to American broadcaster and journalist Frazier Hunt, a friend of Lewis.

== Plot ==
Ralph Prescott, a lawyer with the New York City firm of Beasley, Prescott, Braun and Braun, is feeling the stress and strain of the demands placed on him by city and career. With a fellow club-member, E. Wesson Woodbury, he decides to travel west into the Canadian wilderness for a vacation of fishing and canoeing. Woodbury has made the arrangements, and all that Prescott need do is show up.

Travelling by train through Winnipeg, the duo make their way to the Flambeau River, then to the former logging town of Whitewater. Although Prescott impresses his travelling companion with his handling of a surly innkeeper, the two are already finding themselves to be incompatible. Woodbury chides Prescott over his decision, for example, to carry a pillow in his gear.

Taking the steamer Emily C. Just upriver to their departure point, Prescott and Woodbury finally set out with their native guides / canoe men, but tensions between them grow and tempers fray. After several misadventures in both canoeing and camping, they are openly hostile to one another. It is at this point that they encounter Joe Easter, of the Easter Trading Company. Ralph elects to abandon Woodbury and accept Easter's invitation to stay with him at his place further up the Mantrap River, at the small trading post of Mantrap Landing. Easter and Prescott travel with Lawrence Jackfish, Easter's native factotum, and upon arriving meet McGavity, Easter's dour Scottish competitor in trade, and Easter's wife, Alverna, a former manicurist from the Hotel Ranleagh in Minneapolis, Minnesota, who Easter met while in town and married the next day.

In the ensuing days, Alverna's discontent with the limited social sphere of Mantrap Landing in general, and with Joe Easter in particular, becomes apparent. While tensions are on the rise with the indigenous Cree tribes who also inhabit the area, due to a suspension of their credit with the trading posts, tensions also grow with the introduction of Ralph Prescott to the local social dynamic. Prescott has little experience of women and is a bachelor, and soon he falls for Alverna's charms, but is simultaneously repulsed by the thought of betraying Joe Easter, whom he considers a friend. On reflection, Prescott also feels guilty at abandoning E. Wesson Woodbury, and is several times on the verge of deciding to depart to find him. Finally, after a meeting with the Cree at which the traders make their case for having their bills paid in order to restore the Cree's credit, only to be met with derision, Prescott leaves Mantrap Landing. Lawrence Jackfish pilots him, but they do not get far before Alverna catches up to the canoe and demands that Prescott take her with him. Suffering with a mixture of misgivings over betraying Joe Easter and his inconstant love for Alverna, Prescott agrees.

The route they have taken, however, is longer and harder than anticipated, and as their supplies dwindle, Prescott and Alverna awaken to discover that Lawrence Jackfish has taken most of the supplies and the canoe. As they attempt to continue on foot, they flag down a hydroplane carrying firefighters to battle a nearby wildfire, but the plane cannot carry them. Instead, it drops a few supplies with which they attempt to continue their journey. However, shortly thereafter Joe Easter catches them up, and Prescott meditates on the idea of shooting him outright, but does not. Easter has come not to reclaim Alverna and punish Prescott, but to save Prescott from the mistake that he himself made, of becoming involved with Alverna. Easter goes on to explain that his stocks and warehouse have been destroyed by a fire set by the Cree in reprisal for the traders having cut off their credit: he is now broke and without resources or home (the fate of the others at Mantrap Landing is unclear). Easter wants to make a new start in Winnipeg, and even entertains the idea of travelling with Ralph Prescott to New York to try his luck there. Faced with a choice of whom to take home with him, Prescott chooses Easter, to Alverna's disgust.

After escaping the forest fire together, the three make their way to Winnipeg, where Alverna is put on a train for Minneapolis. Prescott learns that Woodbury had already passed through Winnipeg, and that Woodbury had claimed: "He volunteered that he had chucked you, deserted you, because you were so highbrow that he was bored!" Although Joe Easter has agreed to travel with Ralph Prescott to New York City, he eludes Prescott after shamming drunkenness at a party in an effort to convince Prescott that he is not fit for the sort of life which Ralph envisions. Prescott travels homeward, leaving Joe Easter to start anew in Winnipeg.

== Background and geography ==
In 1923, while travelling in England, Lewis met Sir George Maclaren Brown, general manager of the Canadian Pacific Railway in Europe. Lewis described to his brother Dr Claude Lewis the "treaty expeditions" which travel through northern Canada, and asked how he might join one. The annual Treaty Trip was to meet with indigenous peoples and pay them, in accordance with treaty, five Canadian dollars for what had formerly been Indian lands. Claude suggested using Lewis's contacts, and Lewis in turn spoke to Maclaren Brown. Although the Department of Indian Affairs "had no wish whatever to publicize the annual Treaty Trips", Lewis and his brother were able to join the 1924 trip due to Lewis's influential friends.

Sinclair and Claude Lewis travelled by train to Winnipeg on June 5, 1924, and they proceeded from Big River, Saskatchewan, on June 18. Although there was serious business to be done by the government officials on the trip, Lewis had different ideas: "For me it will be a chance to relax and forget all about writing." Lewis travelled with the expedition from June 18 through July 11, when he said that he had had enough: in part, he had grown testy with Claude, a relationship which he would later recreate in the tension between Ralph Prescott and E. Wesson Woodbury. Lewis left the expedition and traveled back in the direction of Winnipeg, eventually reaching Sauk Center, Minnesota on July 27. This trip became the root of the events depicted in Mantrap.

In the late spring and early summer of 1925, Lewis obtained his brother's journals of the Saskatchewan expedition, and used them as the basis of his storytelling for Mantrap. He placated Claude by saying "Do not be afraid that I'll use any of the stuff in an embarrassing way." He also explains the puzzling nature of the geography of Mantrap: "In fact, I'm going to invent a whole new region up there - supposed to be laid about where the Churchill River is, but with all the rivers, Hudson Bay posts, lakes, etc. given entirely fictitious names." Dr Claude Lewis's journal was published in its entirety in 1985.

== Publication history ==
Mantrap was serialized in Collier's from February to May, 1926. The book was published by Harcourt in June, following its Collier's serial run. It was also published in Great Britain by Jonathan Cape. It has been infrequently reprinted since its original appearance.

== Reception ==
Reviews upon publication were mixed, some critics made comments such as "lamentably weak", "disappointing", "the story becomes intolerable", "poor story, slovenly construction, flaccid dialogue" while others said "excellent", "interesting enough", and "better worth reading than any other novel we have seen this year".

Time Magazine said "[T]he book is rather a mediocre feat for the celebrated scorner of average men, literary grace, Pulitzer Prizes. The flaying of E. Wesson Woodbury may spoil a great many people's summer vacations, but far more malice could have been wrought, and more sales made, if the ending had not been so tediously dragged out. After paddling far up the stream of U. S. literature, Mr. Lewis has idly turned his canoe and shot some unexciting rapids."

== Critical reaction ==
Mark Schorer and Richard Lingeman, Sinclair Lewis's two principal biographers, point out an obvious double-meaning in the title: that the "mantrap" of the locality can also serve as the figurative man-trap of marriage, which Joe Easter recognises and, in the novel's climax, races to rescue Ralph Prescott from making the mistake of becoming entangled with Alverna. In the end, Schorer notes: "Manly friendship proves stronger than woman's wiles."

However, Mantrap was also an example of Lewis departing from the more high-brow problem novel in order to "[turn] out a swell piece of cheese to grab off some easy gravy". Lingeman notes: "Mantrap is shallow, but beneath the surface thrash sea snakes of neuroses and the tensions in Lewis's marriage."

== Adaptions ==
The novel was adapted into the July Mantrap film, starring Clara Bow, Percy Marmont, Ernest Torrence, Ford Sterling, and Eugene Pallette, and directed by Victor Fleming. A subsequent film version, retitled Untamed (1940), boasted changes to characters and plot, including changing Prescott's name and making him a doctor rather than a lawyer. The film starred Ray Milland, Patricia Morison, Akim Tamiroff, and William Frawley as "Les" Woodbury, and was directed by George Archainbaud.

Lewis himself was not a fan of the 1926 adaptation. In the introduction to their 1985 edition of Claude Lewis's journal of the Saskatchewan trip, Koblas and Page recount that while Sinclair Lewis was writing Elmer Gantry, he and his brother and Claude's wife went to the small theatre in Pequot Lake, where Sinclair was writing. The only film playing was Mantrap. The editors continue: "Following the movie, the manager of the theatre, who had during the course of the film recognized Red Lewis in the audience, proudly announced that the author of Mantrap was present and requested that he come on stage and address the moviegoers. Lewis was quick to comply, and he shocked both the manager and the audience by stating he was glad he had read the book, for he would not have recognized it from the movie."

== Editions ==
- Mantrap, by Sinclair Lewis, Harcourt, Brace & Company, 1926.
