= Broken Chains =

Broken Chains may refer to:

- Broken Chains (album), an album by Malcolm Wild
- Broken Chains (film), a 1922 film directed by Allen Holubar

== See also ==
- Chain#Symbolism
