= Mantrap (1926 film) =

1926 film by Victor Fleming

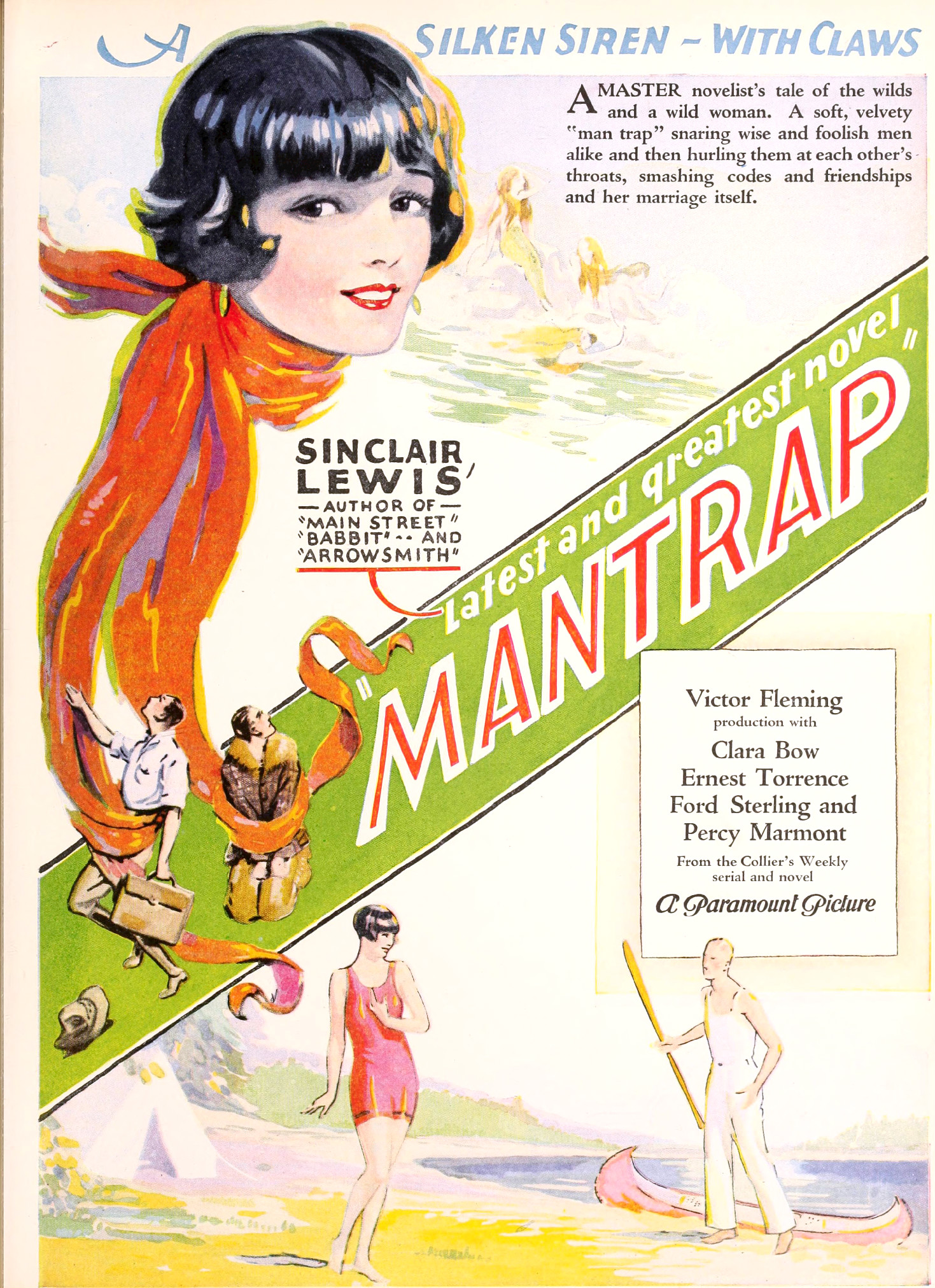
- Advertisement
- Directed by: Victor Fleming
- Written by: Ethel Doherty; Adelaide Heilbron; George Marion Jr. (titles)
- Based on: Mantrap by Sinclair Lewis
- Produced by: B.P. Schulberg; Hector Turnbull
- Starring: Clara Bow; Percy Marmont; Ernest Torrence; Ford Sterling; Eugene Pallette
- Cinematography: James Wong Howe
- Edited by: Adelaide Cannon
- Production company: Famous Players–Lasky Corporation
- Distributed by: Paramount Pictures
- Release date: July 24, 1926 (U.S.)
- Running time: 71 minutes
- Country: United States
- Language: Silent (English intertitles)

Mantrap (1926)

Mantrap is a 1926 American silent comedy film based on the novel of the same name by Sinclair Lewis. Mantrap stars Clara Bow, Percy Marmont, Ernest Torrence, Ford Sterling, and Eugene Pallette, and was directed by Victor Fleming.

== Plot ==
Ralph Prescott is a New York divorce lawyer tired of his clientele. Woodbury, who runs a ladies hosiery business across the hall, suggests that they get away from the city and camp in Mantrap, Canada. Bachelor Joe Easter runs a dry-goods store in Mantrap. Joe, wanting female company, goes to Minneapolis. In a barbershop there, backwoods Joe meets flirtatious manicurist Alverna, who agrees to meet Joe for dinner.

Prescott and Woodbury fight while camping. Joe separates them by taking Prescott back to Mantrap—where Prescott meets Alverna, now married to Joe and bored with backwoods life. Alverna throws a party and flirts, especially with Prescott, who is attracted to her but honorable enough to leave the next day. Alverna waits for Prescott's outbound canoe, stops him, and tells him that she's leaving with him. Alverna insults their Native American guide, who takes the canoe, leaving Prescott and Alverna on their own in the woods. They flag down a passing float plane, which lands in the lake. Alverna flirts with the pilot, angering Prescott. The pilot leaves them some food.

Joe tracks them and, after a few days, catches them. Prescott tells Joe he will marry Alverna if Joe grants a divorce; Joe counters by telling Prescott that Alverna will never stop flirting. Alverna, shut out by the men who are planning her future, takes the canoe and leaves them both.

Prescott returns to his law practice, refreshed by his time in the woods. Joe, lonely in his Mantrap store, defends Alverna to his prudish neighbors—and Alverna returns to Joe, but keeps flirting.

== Cast ==
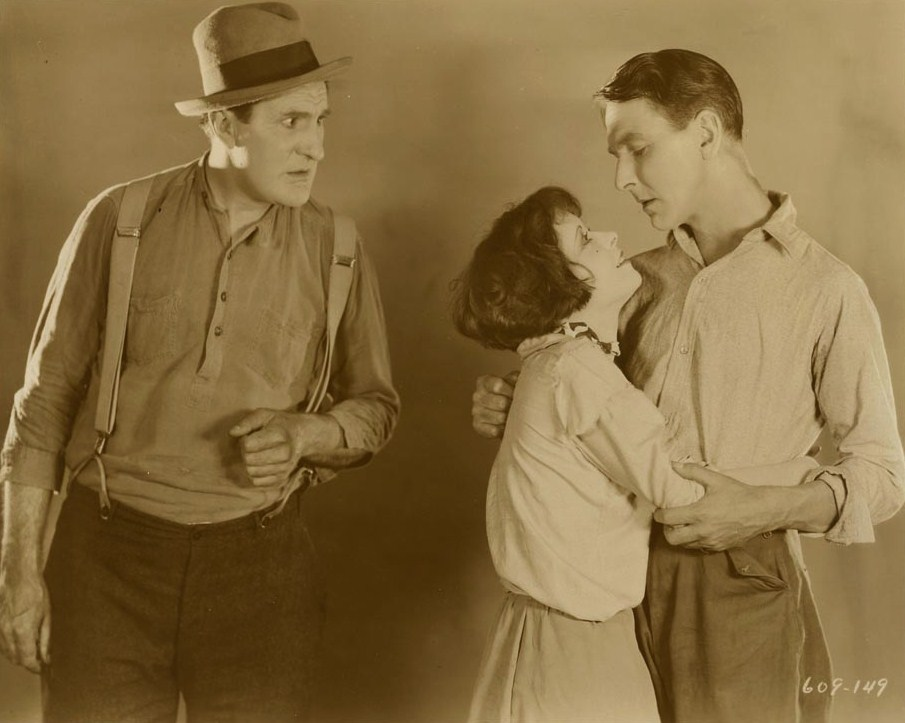
Left to right: Ernest Torrence, Clara Bow, and Percy Marmont

- Clara Bow as Alverna
- Ernest Torrence as Joe Easter
- Ford Sterling as Character
- Percy Marmont as Ralph Prescott
- Eugene Pallette as E. Wesson Woodbury
- Tom Kennedy as Curly Evans
- Josephine Crowell as Mrs. McGavity
- William Orlamond as Mr. McGavity
- Charles Stevens as Lawrence Jackfish (Indian Guide)
- Miss DuPont as Mrs. Barker
- Charlotte Bird as Stenographer
- Ed Brady as Trapper (uncredited)
- Lon Poff as Minister (uncredited)
- Rolfe Sedan as Barber (uncredited)

== Reception ==
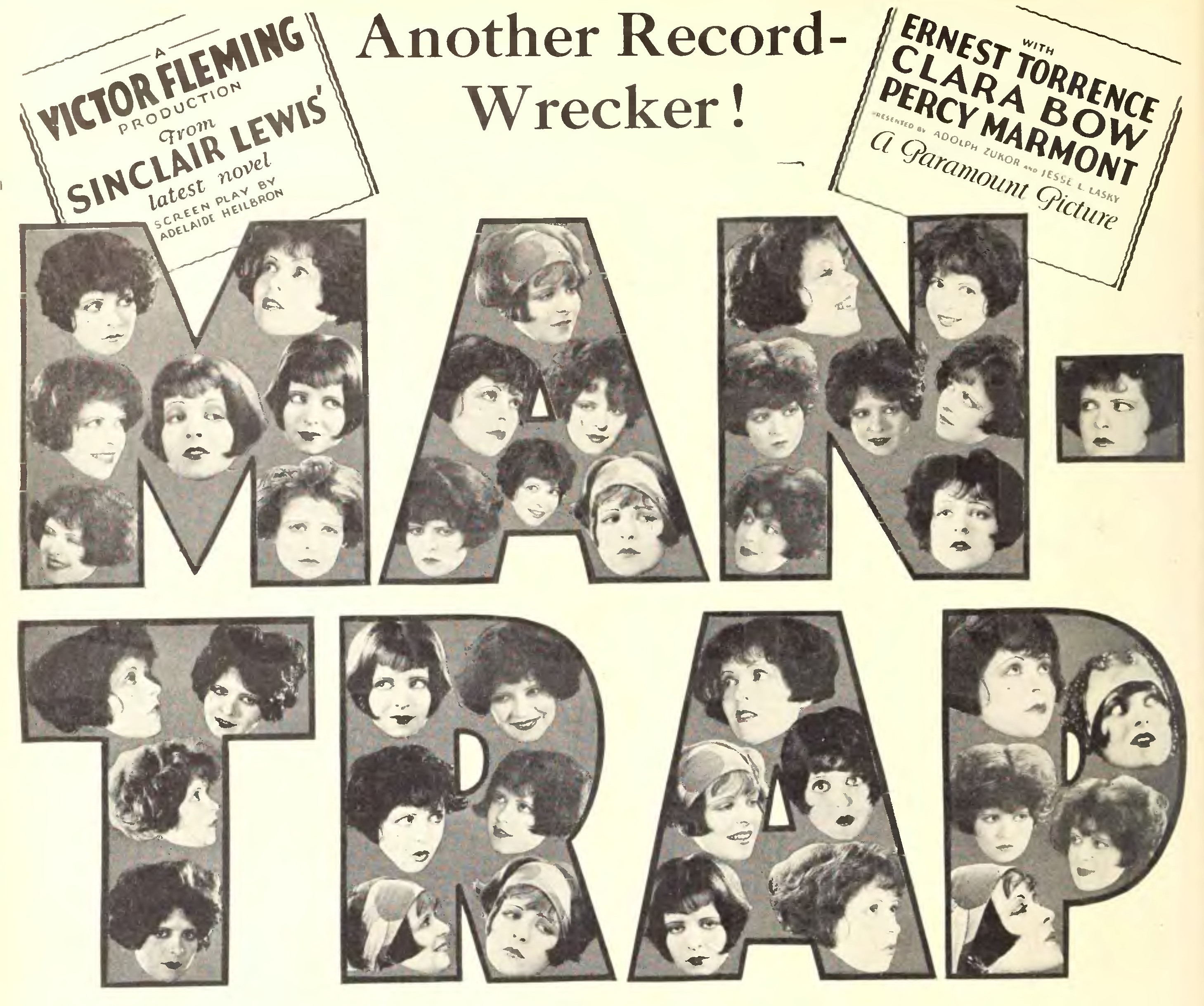
Mantrap ad in Motion Picture News, 1926

Lewis himself was not a fan of the 1926 adaptation. In the introduction to their 1985 edition of Claude Lewis' journal of their Saskatchewan trip, John J. Koblas and Dave Page recount that while Sinclair Lewis was writing Elmer Gantry, he and his brother and Claude's wife went to the small theatre in Pequot Lake, where Sinclair was writing. The only film playing was Mantrap. The editors continue:

"Following the movie, the manager of the theatre, who had during the course of the film recognized Red Lewis in the audience, proudly announced that the author of Mantrap was present and requested that he come on stage and address the moviegoers. Lewis was quick to comply, and he shocked both the manager and the audience by stating he was glad he had read the book, for he would not have recognized it from the movie."

== See also ==
- Flores de otro mundo, a 1999 Spanish film featuring a Cuban girl marrying a Spanish farmer.
