= Unleashed (Humphreys novel) =

2011 novel by Sara Humphreys

- Author: Sara Humphreys
- Language: English
- Series: The Amoveo Legend Series
- Genre: Romance, Paranormal, Fantasy novel
- Publisher: Sourcebooks Casablanca
- Publication date: 2011
- Publication place: United States
- Media type: Print (paperback) Audio (MP3 CD & streaming)
- Pages: 304 pp (US paperback)
- ISBN: 978-1-4022-58435
- Followed by: Untouched

Unleashed is a paranormal/suspense novel written by American author Sara Humphreys. Published in 2011, it is the first book in her The Amoveo Legend Series, which to date has 7 titles.

== Plot summary ==
Samantha Logan is a struggling artist whose career in New York City is not going the way she wants. She must move back to her hometown of Westerly, RI and move in with her grandmother. For a while she's been having dreams about a mysterious man. Much to her surprise the man of her dreamworld is her grandmother's next door neighbor, Malcolm Drew.

Malcolm Drew is a member of an ancient race of shapeshifters called the Amoveo. But the biggest secret of all is that he tells Samantha that she is also an Amoveo, a hybrid. Her father was an Amoveo and her mother was a human with psychic powers. The Amoevo race is dying out and now a new chapter is beginning with humans being lifemates. But in the background of Samantha and Malcolm's budding romance a war is brewing among the Amoveo, one that will put the two of them in the middle.

== Awards ==
- Grave Tells Reader's Choice Award 2011 Favorite Paranormal Romance
