= Charles Elbert Scoggins =

Charles Elbert Scoggins (1888-1955) was an American writer who specialized in adventure stories set in Central America.

Two of his stories were filmed by Hollywood; Untamed in 1929 and Tycoon, first serialized in the Saturday Evening Post in 1932 was filmed with John Wayne in 1947.
