= Undone (Humphreys novel) =

2013 novel by Sara Humphreys

- Author: Sara Humphreys
- Language: English
- Series: The Amoveo Legend Series
- Genre: Romance, Paranormal, Fantasy novel
- Publisher: Sourcebooks Casablanca
- Publication date: 2013
- Publication place: United States
- Media type: Print (paperback)
- Pages: 265 pp (US paperback)
- ISBN: 978-1-4022-5852-7
- Preceded by: Untamed
- Followed by: Unclaimed

Undone is the fourth book in Sara Humphreys’s The Amoveo Legend Series. It takes place after the events in Untamed.

== Plot summary ==
Marianna Coltari wants nothing to do with the Amoveo civil war, she would rather live it up in the city and hang out at her favorite night club (that just happens to be run by a vampire coven). When her brother Dante hires his human employee Pete Castro as her bodyguard, things get interesting.

Pete is a retired cop and doesn't want anything to do with guarding a party girl like Marianna but he is doing it as a favor for his friend. But when Pete finds out about the Amoveo and the pair are in hiding from an enemy.

Pete is Marianna's lifemate, and their attraction is undeniable. Can he protect her? A person from Pete's past may hold the biggest secret of all, as well as the means to fight their enemies.
