= Tycoon (1947 film) =

1947 film

- Film poster
- Directed by: Richard Wallace
- Written by: Borden Chase; John Twist
- Based on: Tycoon by Charles Elbert Scoggins
- Produced by: Stephen Ames
- Starring: John Wayne; Laraine Day; Cedric Hardwicke; Judith Anderson; James Gleason; Anthony Quinn
- Cinematography: W. Howard Greene; Harry J. Wild
- Edited by: Frank Doyle
- Music by: Leigh Harline
- Production company: RKO Radio Pictures
- Distributed by: RKO Radio Pictures
- Release date: December 27, 1947
- Running time: 128 minutes
- Country: United States
- Language: English
- Budget: $3.2 million
- Box office: $2.5 million (US rentals)

Tycoon is a 1947 American Technicolor romantic drama film directed by Richard Wallace and starring John Wayne, Laraine Day and Cedric Hardwicke. It was produced and distributed by RKO Pictures. It is based on the 1934 novel of the same name by Charles Elbert Scoggins.

== Plot ==
Johnny Munroe travels to South America to build a mountain railroad for Frederick Alexander, a wealthy industrialist. He sees and instantly falls in love with the railroad tycoon's daughter Maura. Munroe has a route over the Andes that involves crossing a river, but is longer than Alexander prefers. Complications arise when Alexander insists upon a shorter, more dangerous passage through the mountain between the mainline and the mines the railroad is to serve.

When Alexander's daughter Maura develops a romantic interest with Johnny, falls in love with him, and they wed, Alexander proceeds to sabotage the work by delaying delivery of materiel and insuring that rolling stock needed to make the deliveries is unavailable. As the tunnel gets deeper into the mountain, the rock composition changes and the tunnel roof repeatedly comes down, further delaying the work and injuring and killing the workers and Munroe's supervisors brought in to work the project. Munroe and Frederick's nephew Ricky, an engineer himself, try to convince Alexander the tunnel must be lined with concrete for safety. Alexander refuses to line the tunnel. When yet another cave-in kills Curly, one of Munroe's best men, he uses all the dynamite in the camp to destroy the tunnel and force Alexander to change to the bridge Johnny wanted to build originally. Maura walks out and returns to her father's house, effectively separating from him.

Work on the bridge proceeds as Munroe turns into a tyrant, alienating the men he had brought south to work with him. The lot of them quit, including Pop, his partner and second-in-command. They say they don't know him any more.

When the bridge is almost complete, a cloudburst high in the mountains results in a wall of water roaring down the canyon the bridge crosses. The flood will take several hours to reach the bridge site. The height of the wall of water is the key. The bridge would easily stand up to three feet of water; should withstand eight or ten feet; but more than that is in the hands of God.

Alexander and Ricky, learning of the flash flood, contact lookout points and learn the wall of water is up to fifteen feet. Working alone, Johnny attempts to put the final prefabricated section of the bridge in place in the center of the span, but fails. His North American crew, led by Pop, return to work and finish what is needed to be done. With no time to lock down the prefab center span piece, Munroe drives a work train loaded with rails and heavy equipment onto the center piece, gambling that the weight of the train will hold the center piece in place. The locomotive is finally tipped into the river, but the bridge stands as the wall of water dissipates.

Maura reconciles with Johnny, and the two of them set out on a long-delayed honeymoon. Alexander replaces the Board of Directors of the railroad, all businessmen, with Johnny's yankee engineers. He then sets out to court Maura's former duenna, both he and Johnny knowing the completion of the railroad is in good hands.

== Cast ==
- John Wayne as Johnny Munroe
- Laraine Day as Maura Alexander Munroe
- Cedric Hardwicke as Frederick Alexander
- Judith Anderson as Miss Braithwaite
- James Gleason as Pop Mathews
- Anthony Quinn as Ricky Vegas
- Grant Withers as Fog Harris
- Paul Fix as Joe
- Fernando Alvarado as Chico
- Harry Woods as Holden
- Michael Harvey as Curly Messenger
- Charles Trowbridge as Señor Tobar
- Martin Garralaga as Chávez

== Production ==
Maureen O'Hara was originally cast as Wayne's leading lady, but RKO put her in Sinbad the Sailor instead. Set in the Andes, the film was originally intended to be filmed at RKO's Estudios Churubusco in Mexico City but at the last minute production was shifted to Lone Pine, California.

== Reception ==
Though successful, the film did not earn back its huge production costs of RKO's most expensive production up to that time. It ended up losing $1,035,000.

== See also ==
- John Wayne filmography
