= Amoveo Legend =

Novel series by Sara Humphreys

- Author: Sara Humphreys
- Country: United States
- Language: English
- Genre: Romance, Paranormal
- Publisher: Sourcebooks Casablanca
- Published: October 2011 - current
- Media type: Print (paperback)

The Amoveo Legend series is an ongoing series of paranormal romance novels by author Sara Humphreys. The first book in the series was released in October 2011 by Sourcebooks Casablanca. Humphreys has commented that her inspiration to write the series stems from "her love of the genre and an increasing interest in shape-shifters".

== Series synopsis ==
The Amoveo Legend series follows several members of the Amoveo clan, a group of supernatural beings that are capable of shape-shifting and other supernatural feats. While possessing various abilities, the members of this clan must find their mates before the age of 30 or die as a result. This has been one of the main focuses in the series, with Untamed following a female Amoveo clan member that has chosen to flee her home rather than to remain with a mate she did not choose for herself.

== Reception ==
Reception for the series has been positive, with Untouched gaining positive reviews from Publishers Weekly and RT Book Reviews.

== Amoveo Legend Series ==
=== Novels ===
1. Unleashed, Sourcebooks Casablanca, 2011 [Lifemates: Samantha Logan & Malcolm Drew]
2. Untouched, Sourcebooks Casablanca, 2012 [Lifemates: Kerry Smithson & Dante Coltari]
3. Untamed, Sourcebooks Casablanca, 2012 [Lifemates: Layla Nickelsen & William Fleury]
4. Undone, Sourcebooks Casablanca, 2013 [Lifemates: Marianna Coltari & Pete Castro]
5. Unclaimed, Sourcebooks Casablanca, 2013 [Lifemates: Tatiana Winters & Dominic Trejada]

=== Novellas ===
1. Undenied [E-book], Sourcebooks Casablanca, 2012 [Lifemates: Boris Zankoff & Lillian]
2. Unbound [E-book], Sourcebooks Casablanca, January 2015 [Lifemates: Zach McKenna & Annabelle Caedo]

== Spin-offs ==
=== Dead in the City ===
This series which takes place in New York City, is about a coven of female vampires who run a night club out of an old cathedral. The leader of the coven Olivia Hollingsworth was introduced in the Amoveo book Undone.

1. Tall, Dark and Vampire, Sourcebooks Casablanca, 2013 [Bloodmates: Olivia Hollingsworth & Doug Paxton]
2. Vampire Trouble, Sourcebooks Casablanca, 2014 [Bloodmates: Maya Robertson & Shane Quesada]
3. Vampires Never Cry Wolf, Sourcebooks Casablanca, 2015 [Bloodmates: Sadie Pemberton & Killian Bane]
4. The Good, the Bad and the Vampire, Sourcebooks Casablanca, 2016 [Bloodmates: Trixie LaRoux & Dakota Shelton]
5. The Way of the Vampire [Coming Soon] [Bloodmates: Suzie & Emperor Zhao]

=== Princes of Hell ===
This is a series of e-books that Humphreys is self publishing. It is about a group of seven demons that rule over hell. When a mysterious ring that is rumored to control the brothers is discovered they go out to find it for themselves. Asmodeus was also introduced in the Amoveo book, Undone.

1. Asmodeus: Demon of Lust, Self Published, 2013 (Also in Tall, Dark and Paranormal e-book bundle) [Couple: Kai Kelly & Asmodeus]
2. Demon's Paradise, Self Published, 2019 [Kai & Asmodeus' Honeymoon]

=== Leprechaun's Gold ===
A series of novellas featuring the Leprechaun Fae. Born of Witch and Fae, they are considered outcasts by both races, they lead a secretive and solitary life but many strive for more.

- The series is a spin-off of the Princes of Hell series, which also makes it a spin-off of the Amoveo series.
1. Luck of the Irish, Self Published, 2015 (Part One available in the "Get Lucky" e-book bundle released March 2015)

=== McGuire Brothers ===
A contemporary romance series concerning five brothers who are all part of a tight-knit New England family and are all men in uniform. The heroine in Brave the Heat, Jordan is related to Zach from Unbound, through marriage it would seem.

1. Brave the Heat, Sourcebooks Casablanca, 2015 [Couple: Gavin McGuire & Jordan McKenna] (Firefighter)
2. Trouble Walks In, Sourcebooks Casablanca, August 2, 2016 [Couple: Ronan McGuire & Maddy Morgan] (K-9 Officer)

=== Amoveo Rising ===
A new bridge series between the Amoveo novels and the Dragon Heat novels.

1. Undiscovered (2017) [Lifemates: Rena McHale & Zander Lorens]
