= Untamed (1940 film) =

- Theatrical release poster
- Directed by: George Archainbaud
- Screenplay by: Frederick Hazlitt Brennan; Frank Butler
- Based on: Mantrap; 1926 novel by Sinclair Lewis
- Produced by: Paul Jones
- Starring: Ray Milland; Patricia Morison; Akim Tamiroff
- Cinematography: Leo Tover
- Edited by: Stuart Gilmore
- Music by: William Axt (as Dr. William Axt)
- Production company: Paramount Pictures
- Distributed by: Paramount Pictures
- Release date: July 24, 1940
- Running time: 83 minutes
- Country: United States
- Language: English

for others with the same name, see Untamed (disambiguation)

Untamed is a 1940 American Technicolor adventure film directed by George Archainbaud and starring Ray Milland, Patricia Morison and Akim Tamiroff. It is based on the 1926 Sinclair Lewis novel Mantrap.

== Plot ==
A doctor takes a hunting trip to the Canadian wilderness. When he gets badly mauled by a bear, his life is saved by his guide Joe Easter.

Easter takes the doctor to his cabin, where he is nursed to recovery by Easter's young beautiful wife Alverna, and they fall in love. Easter leaves for an extended hunting trip while the doctor and Alverna grapple with their feelings for each other, a blizzard and an epidemic.

== Cast ==
- Ray Milland as Dr. William Crawford
- Patricia Morison as Alverna Easter
- Akim Tamiroff as Joe Easter
- William Frawley as Les Woodbury
- Jane Darwell as Mrs. Maggie Moriarty
- Esther Dale as Mrs. Smith
- J.M. Kerrigan as Angus McGavity
- Eily Malyon as Mrs. Sarah McGavity
- Fay Helm as Miss Olcott
- Clem Bevans as 'Smokey' Moseby, the Blind Man
- Sibyl Harris as Mrs. Dillon
- Roscoe Ates as Bert Dillon
- J. Farrell MacDonald as Doctor Billar
- Gertrude Hoffman as Miss Rhine (as Gertrude W. Hoffman)
- Charles Waldron as Doctor Hughes
- Darryl Hickman as Mickey Moriarty
- Charlene Wyatt as Milly Dee
- Bahe Denetdeel as Skookum
- Donna Jean Lester as Judy
