= Untamed (1929 film) =

1929 film

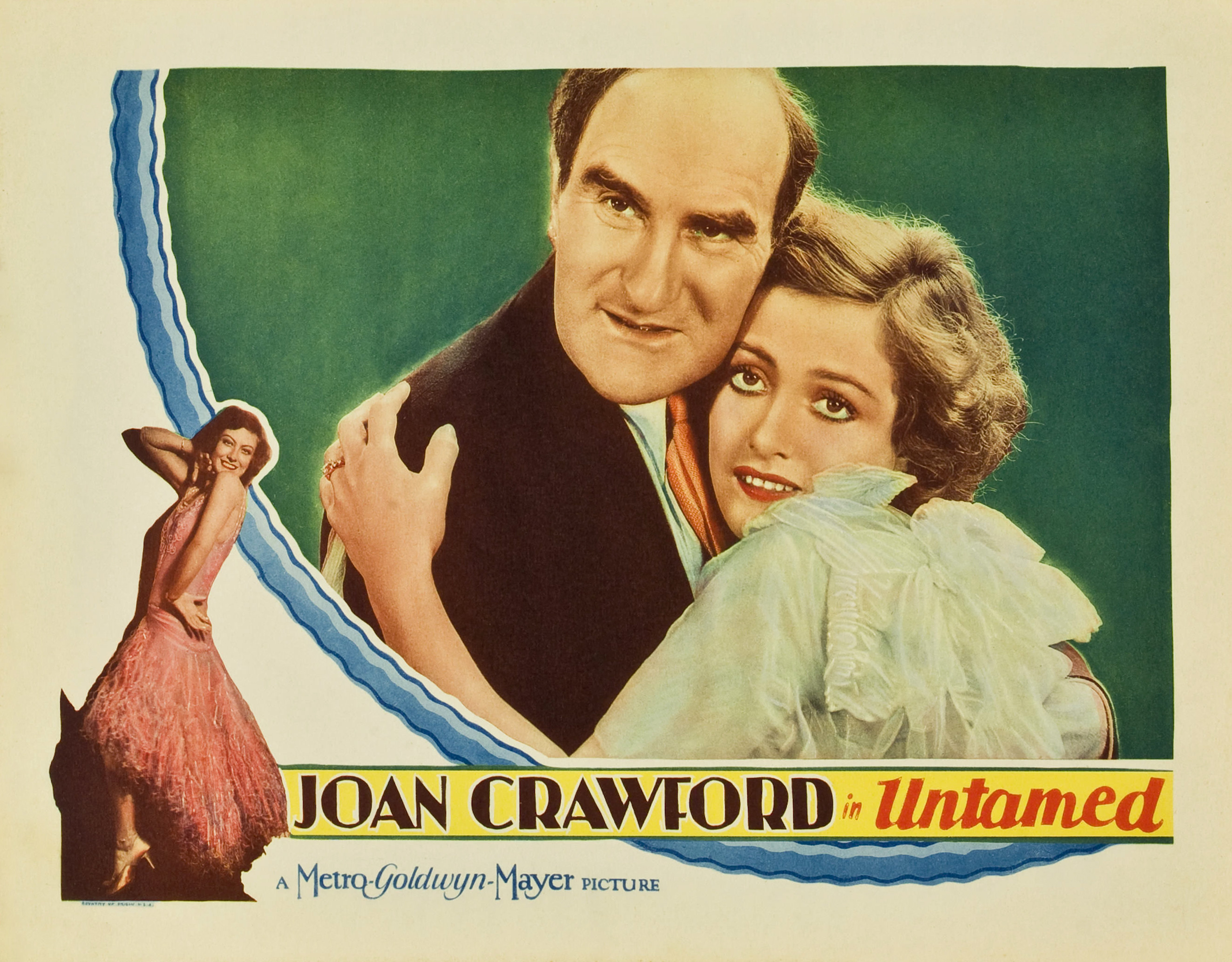
- Directed by: Jack Conway
- Written by: Sylvia Thalberg; Frank Butler; Dialogue: Willard Mack
- Based on: a short story by Charles E. Scoggins
- Starring: Joan Crawford; Robert Montgomery; Ernest Torrence; Holmes Herbert
- Cinematography: Oliver T. Marsh
- Edited by: Charles Hochberg; William S. Gray
- Music by: William Axt
- Distributed by: Metro-Goldwyn-Mayer
- Release date: November 23, 1929
- Running time: 86 minutes
- Country: United States
- Language: English
- Budget: $229,000
- Box office: $974,000

Untamed is a 1929 American pre-Code Metro-Goldwyn-Mayer romantic drama film directed by Jack Conway and starring Joan Crawford, Robert Montgomery, Ernest Torrence, Holmes Herbert, Gwen Lee, and Lloyd Ingraham. The script was adapted by Sylvia Thalberg and Frank Butler, with dialogue by Willard Mack, from a story by Charles E. Scoggins.

Made during MGM's transition from silent to sound movies, Untamed was Crawford's first non-musical talkie. It was the first role as a leading man for Montgomery, who made several silents before this film.

== Plot ==
Untamed (1929)

An oil prospector, Henry "Hank" Dowling, has raised his free-spirited daughter, Alice "Bingo" Dowling, in the jungle of South America. He asks his friend, Ben Murchison, to come work with him on oil wells that have made him rich. Just as Ben arrives with his friend, Howard Presley, Hank is killed by a transient oil worker who has designs on Bingo.

At a relatively young age, Bingo has now inherited her father's company and wealth and Ben is appointed her guardian. She calls him and Howard both uncles, but they are not related. She is sassy and without refinement, hitting anyone she disagrees with. Her "uncles" decide that the wild Bingo should move to New York City, learn proper deportment and enter society. While they are aboard the ocean liner, she meets the young, good-looking and well-educated charmer Andy McAllister.

It is love at first sight for Bingo and Andy while on the boat, but because Andy lacks money to care for Bingo, Ben convinces the two to part in New York and see if they still miss each other after a few months. Life goes on in New York, but roughly a year later, the two reunite and declare that their feelings for each other have not departed. The two begin seeing each other again. Still, because she is very wealthy and he is not, he is afraid of what people might think and tells her that he cannot marry her and live off her money. To complicate the situation further, Bingo's Uncle Ben discourages the relationship and "Uncle" Howard actually has feelings for Bingo himself. As Bingo is about to declare their intention to marry, Ben even offers Andy $20,000 to start a new life, knowing full-well that would cause him to leave Bingo.

When Andy turns to second-string Marjory, an irate Bingo loses her temper and shoots him in the shoulder. They make up immediately after the shooting and forgive each other. Changing his mind about leaving her, Andy decides that Bingo is the woman for him and wants to marry her. Ben offers him a job in the oil wells making a substantial salary, and the two intend to live together now.

== Cast ==
- Joan Crawford as Alice 'Bingo' Dowling
- Robert Montgomery as Andy McAllister
- Ernest Torrence as Ben Murchison
- Holmes Herbert as Howard Presley
- John Miljan as Bennock
- Gwen Lee as Marjory 'Marge'
- Edward Nugent as Paul
- Gertrude Astor as Mrs. Mason
- Lloyd Ingraham as Henry 'Hank' Dowling
- Wilson Benge as Billcombe, the Butler

== Reception ==
While Untamed was a box-office success and continued Joan Crawford's rise as a fan favorite, the critical reviews were mixed. The New York Times critic Mordaunt Hall wrote "this pictorial effusion never really appears to get outside the wall of a Hollywood studio. It does wander, however, from anything real, and the trite dialogue and vacillating natures of some of the persons involved make one shudder to think to what queer lengths producers can go with their relatively new vocalized toy." He commented on the vocal talents of Crawford—her first talkie—by saying, "Miss Crawford has a good voice, but she never strikes one as a girl who has been away from civilization for most of her life. There are moments when the fault is with Miss Crawford, and then there are instances where one is impelled to sympathize with her because of her lines."

Another critic, from the Brooklyn Eagle, also commented on Crawford's voice with: "If Untamed does little else for Miss Crawford, it proves that she is an actress for whom the microphones should hold no fear. Her diction is clear and unaffected and while there is nothing in the lines that offers her opportunity for exceptional acting, she managed to make the impulsive heroine of the story somewhat more credible than the part deserves."

Author Scott Eyman wrote "While her acting was shaky, it was better than her singing and dancing...Were it not for Crawford's boundless energy, flashing sensuality, and popularity with the shopgirl audience, Thalberg might have given her up as a bad job."

=== Box office ===
According to MGM records, the film earned $714,000 in the U.S. and Canada and $260,000 in other markets, resulting in a profit of $508,000.

== Music ==
In the opening scene of Untamed, Crawford dances as she sings the theme song "Chant of the Jungle." The song, written by Nacio Herb Brown and Arthur Freed, became a hit in 1929. She and Montgomery also sing the Louis Alter and Arthur Freed tune "That Wonderful Something Is Love" later in the film.

Original music for Untamed was composed by Louis Alter, Nacio Herb Brown, and William Axt. Lyrics were written by Arthur Freed and Joe Goodwin.

== See also ==
- List of early sound feature films (1926–1929)
