= Ernest Torrence =

Scottish actor

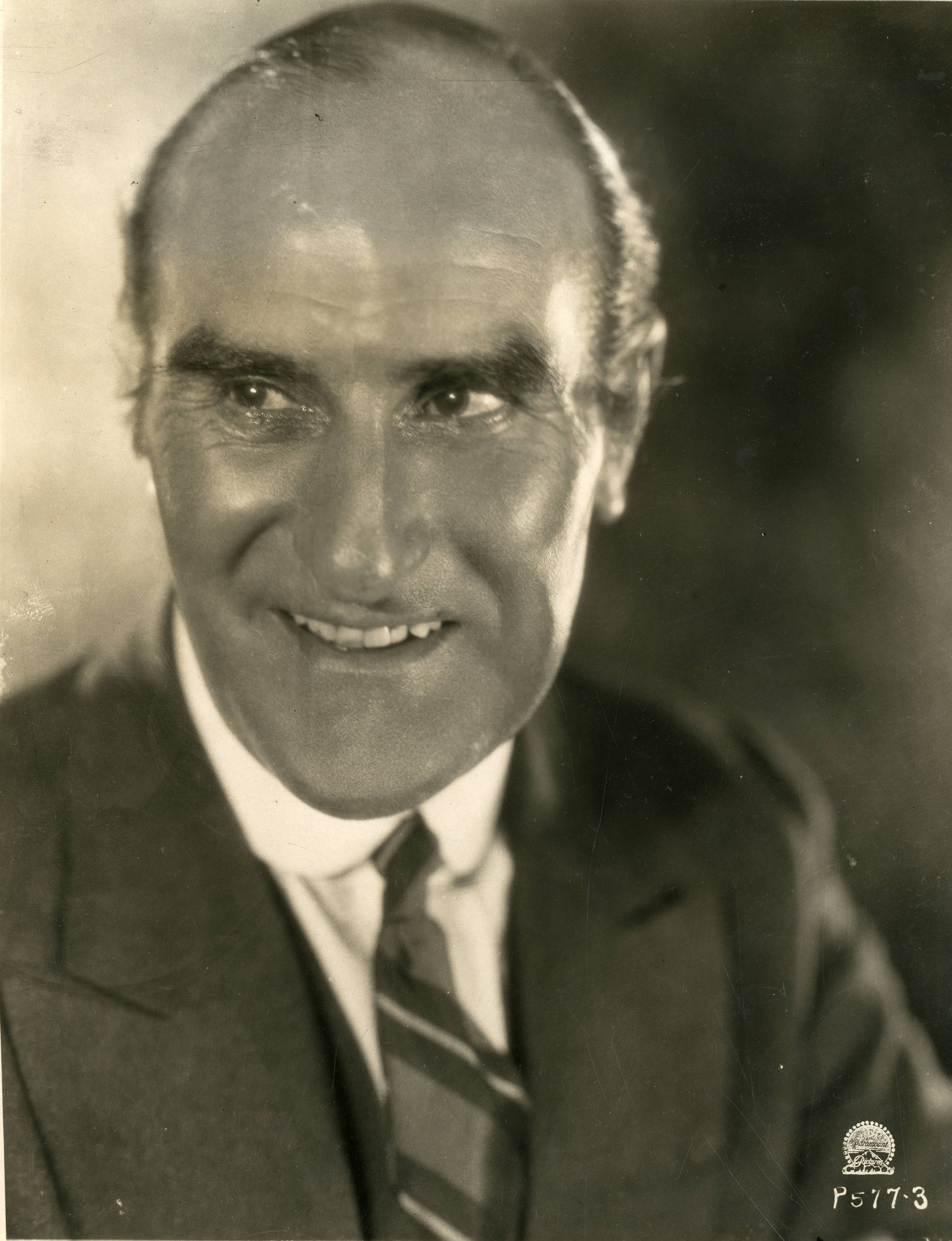
- Torrence in 1924
- Born: Ernest Thayson Torrence-Thomson; 26 June 1878; Edinburgh, Midlothian, Scotland
- Died: 15 May 1933 (aged 54); New York City, U.S.
- Education: Edinburgh Academy; Royal Academy of Music
- Occupation: Actor
- Years active: 1901–1933
- Spouse: Elsie Reamer Bedbrook (m. 1902)
- Children: Ian Torrence (b. 1907; d. 1966)
- Relatives: David Torrence (brother)

Ernest Torrence (born Ernest Torrance-Thomson, 26 June 1878 – 15 May 1933) was a Scottish film character actor who appeared in many Hollywood films, including Broken Chains (1922) with Colleen Moore, Mantrap (1926) with Clara Bow and Fighting Caravans (1931) with Gary Cooper and Lili Damita. A towering figure, 6 ft 4 in (1.93 m) tall, Torrence frequently played cold-eyed and imposing villains.

== Biography ==
=== Education and early work ===
He was born to Colonel Henry Torrence Thayson and Jessie (née Bryce) on 26 June 1878, in Edinburgh, Scotland, and as a child was an exceptional pianist and operatic baritone and graduated from the Stuttgart Conservatory, Edinburgh Academy before earning a scholarship at London's Royal Academy of Music. He toured with the D'Oyly Carte Opera Company in such productions as The Emerald Isle (1901), Little Hans Andersen (1903) and The Talk of the Town (1905) before disarming vocal problems set in and he was forced to abandon this career path.

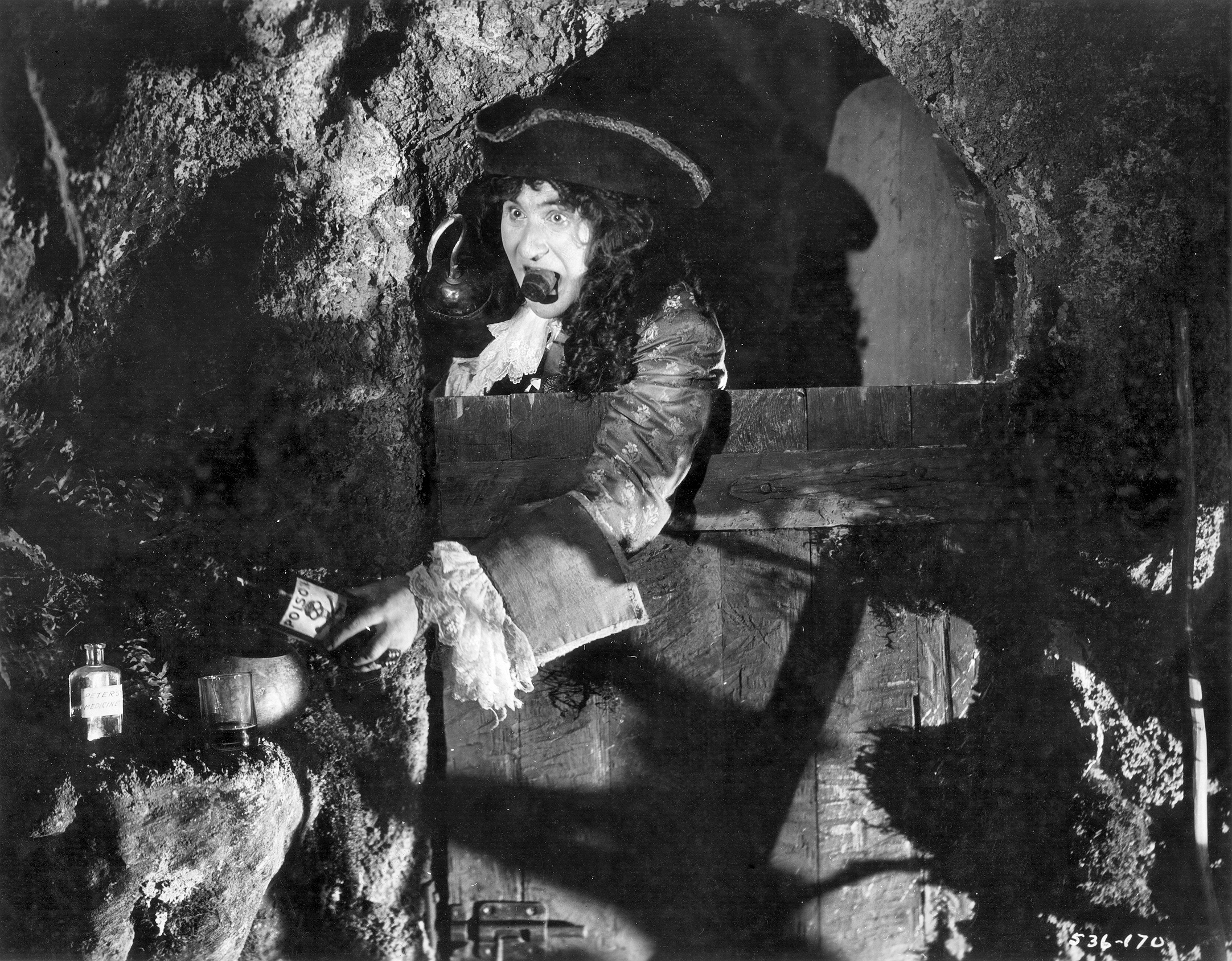
Ernest Torrence as Captain Hook in the film Peter Pan

Sometime prior to 1900, he changed the spelling of Torrance to Torrence and dropped the name Thomson. Both Ernest and his actor brother David Torrence went to America, with Ernest joining David in New York in September 1911. Focusing on a purely acting career, Ernest and his brother developed into experienced players on the Broadway New York stage. Ernest received significant acclaim with Modest Suzanne in 1912, and a prominent role in The Night Boat in 1920 brought him to the attention of the early Hollywood filmmakers. He also created the role of the painter Andrew McMurray in Victor Herbert's The Only Girl (1914).

=== Film career ===
Torrence as "William Jackson" in The Covered Wagon (1923)

Torrence played the despicable adversary Luke Hatburn in Tol'able David (1921) opposite Richard Barthelmess and immediately settled into films for the rest of his career and life. He played a veteran pioneer in the acclaimed classic western The Covered Wagon (1923), and gained attention from his roles in The Hunchback of Notre Dame (1923) as Clopin, king of the beggars, and with Betty Bronson in Peter Pan (1924) as the dastardly Captain Hook. He played an Army General who escapes into the circus world and becomes a clown in The Side Show of Life (1924).

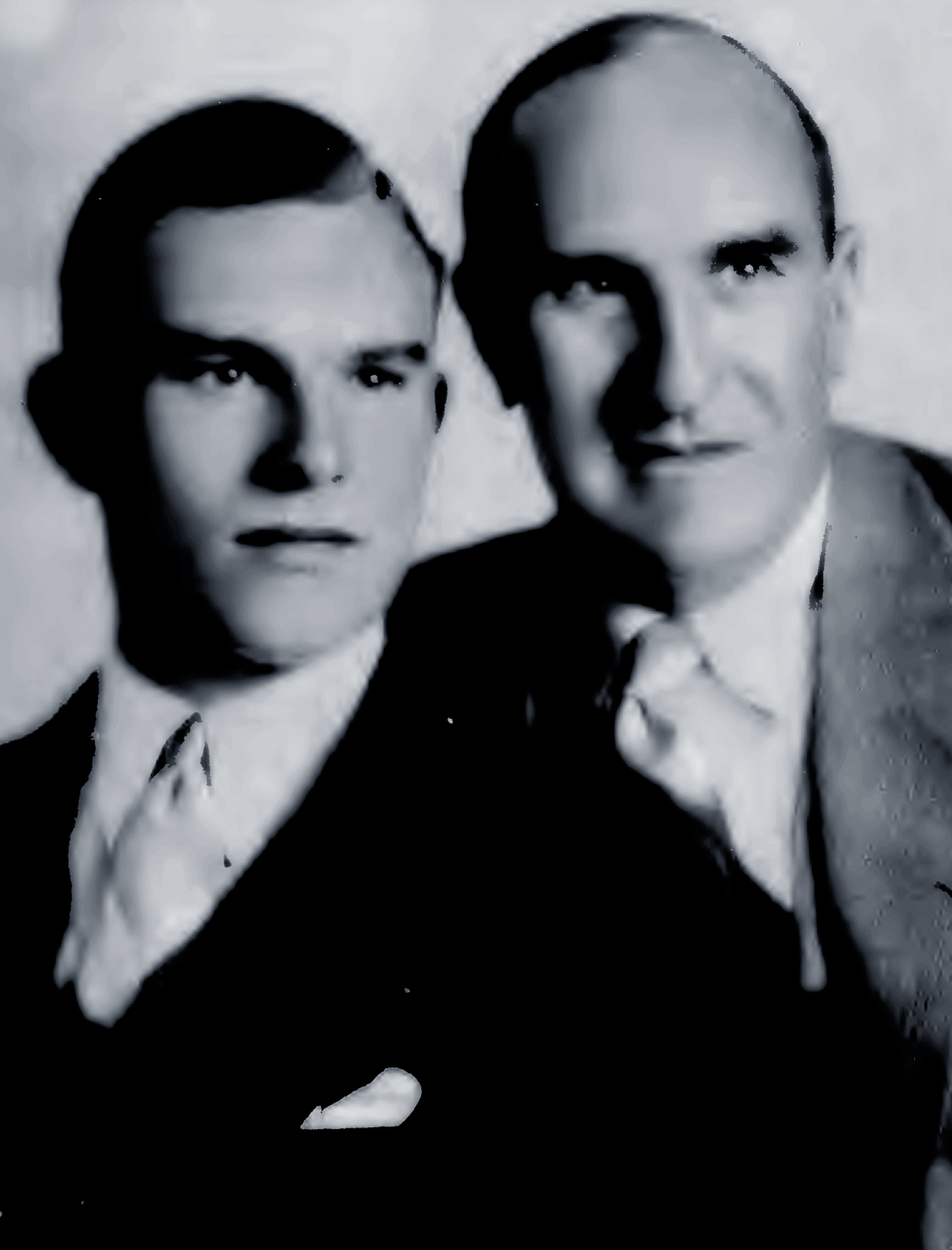
Father and son, Ernest and Ian Torrence

In an offbeat bit of casting he paired up with Clara Bow in Mantrap (1926), unusually as a gentle, giant type backwoodsman in search of a wife. He appeared in other silent film classics such as The King of Kings (1927) (as Peter) and Steamboat Bill, Jr. (1928) as Buster Keaton's steamboat captain father. During the course of his twelve-year film career, Ernest made 49 films, both silent and "talkies".

=== Death ===
Torrence made the transition into talking films very well, starring in Fighting Caravans (1931) with Gary Cooper and Lili Damita. He was able to play a notable nemesis, Dr. Moriarty, to Clive Brook's Sherlock in Sherlock Holmes (1932) in one of his last roles.

Filming for I Cover the Waterfront (1933), in which he starred as a smuggler opposite Claudette Colbert in New York City, had just been completed when he died suddenly on 15 May 1933. While en route to Europe by ship, Torrence suffered an acute attack of gall stones and was rushed back to a New York City hospital. He died of complications following surgery.

== Partial filmography ==
- A Dangerous Affair (1919) - Abner
- Tol'able David (1921) - Luke Hatburn
- The Prodigal Judge (1922) - Solomon Mahaffy
- Singed Wings (1922) - Emilio
- Broken Chains (1922) - Boyan Boone
- The Kingdom Within (1922) - Krieg
- The Covered Wagon (1923) - William Jackson
- The Trail of the Lonesome Pine (1923) - 'Devil' Jud Tolliver
- The Brass Bottle (1923) - Fakresh-el-Aamash
- The Hunchback of Notre Dame (1923) - Clopin
- Ruggles of Red Gap (1923) - Cousin Egbert Floud
- West of the Water Tower (1923) - Rev. Adrian Plummer
- Heritage of the Desert (1924) - August Naab
- The Fighting Coward (1924) - Gen. Orlando Jackson
- The Side Show of Life (1924) - Andrew Lackaday
- North of 36 (1924) - Jim Nabours
- Peter Pan (1924) - Captain James Hook
- The Dressmaker from Paris (1925) - Angus McGregor
- The Wanderer (1925) - Tola
- Night Life of New York (1925) - John Bentley
- The Pony Express (1925) - 'Ascension' Jones
- The American Venus (1926) - King Neptune
- The Blind Goddess (1926) - Mr. Clayton
- The Rainmaker (1926) - Mike
- Mantrap (1926) - Joe Easter
- The Lady of the Harem (1926) - Hassan
- The King of Kings (1927) - Peter
- Captain Salvation (1927) - Captain of the 'Panther'
- Twelve Miles Out (1927) - Red McCue
- Across to Singapore (1928) - Capt. Mark Shore
- Steamboat Bill, Jr. (1928) - William "Steamboat Bill" Canfield Sr.
- The Cossacks (1928) - Ivan
- Desert Nights (1929) - Lord Stonehill
- The Bridge of San Luis Rey (1929) - Uncle Pio
- Speedway (1929) - Jim MacDonald
- The Unholy Night (1929) - Dr. Ballou
- Untamed (1929) - Ben Murchison
- Officer O'Brien (1930) - John P. O'Brien
- Strictly Unconventional (1930) - Lord Porteous
- Sweet Kitty Bellairs (1930) - Sir Jasper Standish
- Call of the Flesh (1930) - Esteban
- Fighting Caravans (1931) - Bill Jackson
- Shipmates (1931) - Scotty
- The Great Lover (1931) - Potter
- Sporting Blood (1931) - Mr. Jim Rellence
- New Adventures of Get Rich Quick Wallingford (1931) - Blackie Daw
- The Cuban Love Song (1931) - Romance
- Sherlock Holmes (1932) - Professor James Moriarty
- Hypnotized (1932) - Prof. Horace S. Limberly - Hypnotist
- I Cover the Waterfront (1933) - Eli Kirk (final film role)
