= Broken Chains (film) =

1922 film

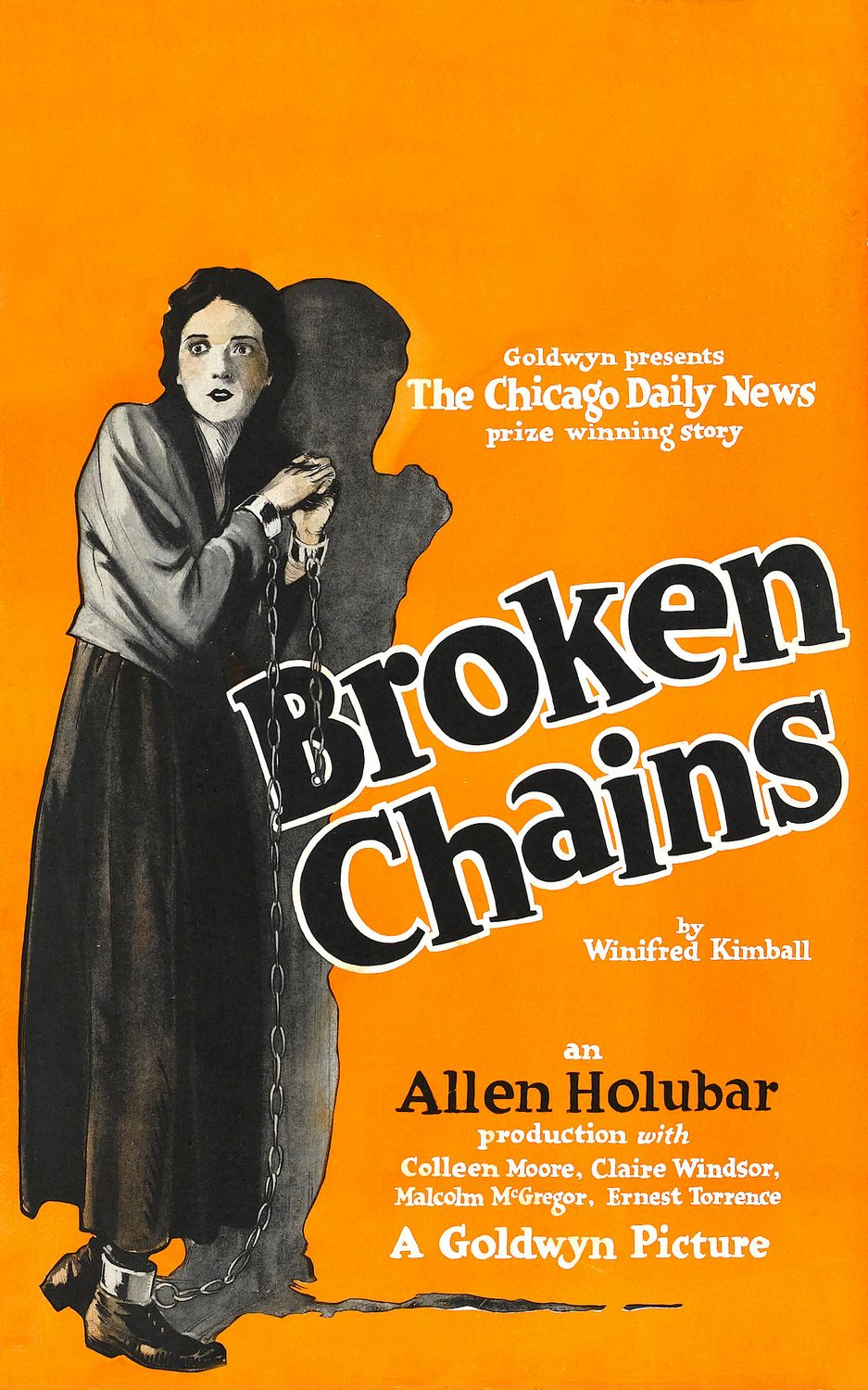
- Theatrical poster
- Directed by: Allen Holubar
- Screenplay by: Carey Wilson; Tay Garnett
- Story by: Winifred Kimball
- Produced by: Allen Holubar
- Starring: Colleen Moore; Malcolm McGregor; Ernest Torrence
- Cinematography: Byron Haskin
- Production company: Goldwyn Pictures Corporation
- Distributed by: Goldwyn Distributing Company
- Release date: December 10, 1922
- Running time: 70 minutess
- Country: United States
- Languages: Silent; English intertitles

Broken Chains is a 1922 American silent melodrama film directed by Allen Holubar. Starring Colleen Moore, Malcolm McGregor, and Ernest Torrence, it was based on the winning story from a scenario contest held by the Goldwyn Pictures Corporation and the Chicago Daily News. A print of Broken Chains is preserved at the George Eastman Museum archive.

== Plot ==
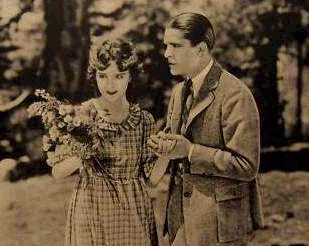
Colleen Moore and Malcolm McGregor in Broken Chains.

Wealthy Peter Wyndham is useless in attempting to prevent the theft of Hortense Allen's jewelry. A butler is killed during the robbery, and, unable to face his cowardice, Peter heads west. He takes a job working for his father's lumber mill. Meanwhile, elsewhere, Mercy Boone's newborn child has died. Boyan Boone, her husband, is callous towards the loss. He is a thug and ne'er-do-well, with a band of thieves working with him. When Mercy attempts to escape, she meets Peter before Boyan returns her to his cabin where he chains her. Peter finds her and they begin a romance under Boyan's nose. Boyan learns and beats up Peter, who summons the strength to fight him for the honor of Mercy.

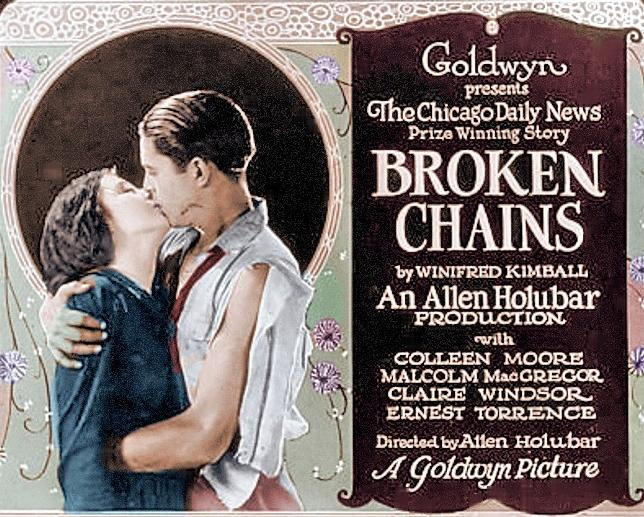
Lobby card of Colleen Moore and Malcolm McGregor in Broken Chains.

== Cast ==
- Malcolm McGregor as Peter Wyndham
- Colleen Moore as Mercy Boone
- Ernest Torrence as Boyan Boone
- Claire Windsor as Hortense Allen
- James Marcus as Pat Mulcahy
- Beryl Mercer as Mrs Mulcahy
- William Orlamond as Slog Sallee
- Gerald Pring as Butler
- Edward Peil Sr. as Burglar (credited as Edward Peil)
- Leo Willis as Gus

== Production ==
The Chicago Daily News, together with The Goldwyn Company, held a national scenario writing contest in 1921; (Note: Scenario writing contests were common promotional devices at the time.) first prize was $10,000 and a Goldwyn production based on the story. Among 27,000 entries, Winifred Kimball's "Broken Chains" was selected. The story was then given to experienced scenarist Carey Wilson to make it ready for filming.

Allen Holubar was borrowed from Associated First National for the project. Colleen Moore was the first actor to be cast. Stories in the trade press suggested concerns as to whether she would be equal to the heavily dramatic role, but her prior work was not limited to comedy and she had not been typecast. The role was expected to be her big break but failed to establish her as a star.

Casting was complete by June and filming was started. Portions of the film were shot in Northern California, near Santa Cruz in an area known as Poverty Flats. By August photography was completed.

== Reception ==
Broken Chains premiered December 10, 1922, in New York and Los Angeles, and went into general release December 24.

The Variety reviewer devoted several paragraphs to criticizing the climactic fight scene, calling it "preposterous" and reporting that the audience made fun of it. The plot overall was called "conventional"; however, the cast was commended. The review in The Film Daily found the scenario disappointing and opined, "The theme suffers severely from extreme characterization in each of the principal people." The reviewer advised exhibitors that the film "will satisfy those who still like the old-fashioned type of meller" and called the posters good looking.

In contrast, a review in Photodramatist, a magazine aimed at writers, praised both the story and the production: "There is the consummate handling of a subtle and really difficult theme, the sure touch in characterizations which so easily could have slipped into burlesque and bathos, the rapid piling of suspense on peril until the cumulative effect is terrific." A critic for the Santa Cruz Evening News, locale of the exterior filming, singled out Moore for praise: "Colleen Moore ... attains new laurels as an emotional actress. Her work is thoroughly convincing during the difficult sequences ..."
