= Sara Humphreys =

American romance writer

Sara Taney Humphreys
- Education: Marist College (BA)
- Occupation: Novelist
- Writing career
- Pen name: Sara Humphreys
- Period: 2009–present
- Genres: Romance, Paranormal, Fantasy, Contemporary

Sara Humphreys is an American romance writer. She has published several novels in the romance genre.

== Biography ==
Sara Humphreys is a graduate of Marist College and has B.A. in English Literature & Theater. After college she pursued a career in acting. With acting credits in such shows as Guiding Light, As the World Turns and the fire house drama Rescue Me.

She is also the President of Taney Speaker Training, helping corporations and colleges in public speaking, presentation development and communication skills training.

Her novels have been recognized in many contests and her novel Untamed in 2013 won two FF&P PRISM awards for "Best of the Best" and "Best Dark Paranormal." Publishers Weekly even gave Untouched a star review. She wrote a column for USA Today's Life section under the Happy Ever After byline, which includes reviews on TV shows like The Walking Dead.

In recent years, she has been working in the elderly care industry.

== Bibliography ==
=== As Sara Taney Humphreys ===
- The Amoveo Legacy, Devine Destinies Publishing, 2009 [Republished by Sourcebooks Casablanca as Unleashed]

=== As Sara Humphreys ===
All books have a shared world, except Stilettos & Seductions.

==== The Amoveo Legend ====
This series is about the Amoveo, a species of shapeshifters that are divided into 10 clans. They have the ability to teleport themselves and shift into their respective animals. Living secretly among humans and searching for their soul mates. Without their soul mates they cannot have children and lose their powers. Each book in the series deals with one couple, their relationship and the war with enemies that seek to destroy the Amoveo.

1. Unleashed, Sourcebooks Casablanca, 2011 [Lifemates: Samantha Logan & Malcolm Drew]
2. Untouched, Sourcebooks Casablanca, 2012 [Lifemates: Kerry Smithson & Dante Coltari]
3. Undenied [E-book], Sourcebooks Casablanca, 2012 [Lifemates: Boris Zankoff & Lillian]
4. Untamed, Sourcebooks Casablanca, 2012 [Lifemates: Layla Nickelsen & William Fleury]
5. Undone, Sourcebooks Casablanca, 2013 [Lifemates: Marianna Coltari & Pete Castro]
6. Unclaimed, Sourcebooks Casablanca, 2013 [Lifemates: Tatiana Winters & Dominic Trejada]
7. Unbound [E-book], Sourcebooks Casablanca, January 2015 [Lifemates: Zach McKenna & Annabelle Caedo]

==== Amoveo Rising ====
1. Undiscovered (2017) [Lifemates: Rena McHale & Zander Lorens]

==== Dead in the City ====
This series which takes place in New York City, is about a coven of female vampires who run a night club out of an old cathedral. The leader of the coven Olivia Hollingsworth was introduced in the Amoveo book Undone. As with the Amoveo books each concerns a couple and the legend of a Bloodmate.

1. Tall, Dark and Vampire, Sourcebooks Casablanca, 2013 [Bloodmates: Olivia Hollingsworth & Doug Paxton]
2. Vampire Trouble, Sourcebooks Casablanca, 2014 [Bloodmates: Maya Robertson & Shane Quesada]
3. Vampires Never Cry Wolf, Sourcebooks Casablanca, 2015 [Bloodmates: Sadie Pemberton & Killian Bane]
4. The Good, the Bad and the Vampire, Sourcebooks Casablanca, 2016 [Bloodmates: Trixie LaRoux & Dakota Shelton]

==== Princes of Hell ====
This is a series of e-books that Humphreys is self publishing. It is about a group of seven demons that rule over hell. When a mysterious ring that is rumored to control the brothers is discovered they go out to find it for themselves. Asmodeus was also introduced in the Amoveo book, Undone.

1. Asmodeus: Demon of Lust, Self Published, 2013 (Also in Tall, Dark and Paranormal e-book bundle) [Couple: Kai Kelly & Asmodeus]
2. Demon's Paradise, Self Published, 2018 (About Kai & Asmodeus' honeymoon.)

==== Stilettos and Seductions ====
- (Originally published as Willow James)

An erotic romance series revolving around people associated with a lingerie store.

1. Pumped, Self Published, 2013 [Couple: Skylar Sole & Griffin Blaze]
2. Enthralled, Self Published, 2014 [Couple: Jessica & Kendrick Muir]

==== Leprechaun's Gold ====
A series of novellas featuring the Leprechaun Fae. Born of Witch and Fae, they are considered outcasts by both races, they lead a secretive and solitary life but many strive for more.

- The series is a spin-off of the Princes of Hell series.
1. Luck of the Irish, Self Published, 2015 (Part One available in the "Get Lucky" e-book bundle released March 2015)

==== McGuire Brothers ====
A contemporary romance series about brothers who are all part of a tight-knit New England family and are all men in uniform.

1. Brave the Heat, Sourcebooks Casablanca, 2015 [Couple: Gavin McGuire & Jordan McKenna] (Firefighter)
2. Trouble Walks In, Sourcebooks Casablanca, 2016 [Couple: Ronan McGuire & Maddy Morgan] (K-9 Officer)

==== Non-fiction ====
- Street Team Smarts: An Author's Guide to Building and Running a Successful Street Team, Self Published, 2013 [E-book]
