= Untamed (Humphreys novel) =

- Author: Sara Humphreys
- Language: English
- Series: The Amoveo Legend Series
- Genre: Romance, Paranormal, Fantasy novel
- Publisher: Sourcebooks Casablanca
- Publication date: 2012
- Publication place: United States
- Media type: Print (paperback)
- Pages: 303 pp (US paperback)
- ISBN: 978-1-4022-5849-7
- Preceded by: Undenied
- Followed by: Undone

Untamed is the third book in Sara Humphreys’s The Amoveo Legend Series. It takes place some months after the events in Untouched.

== Awards ==
- PRISM Double Award Winner 2013
  - Best of the Best
  - Dark Paranormal/Urban Fantasy
