= The Battling Orioles =

1924 film

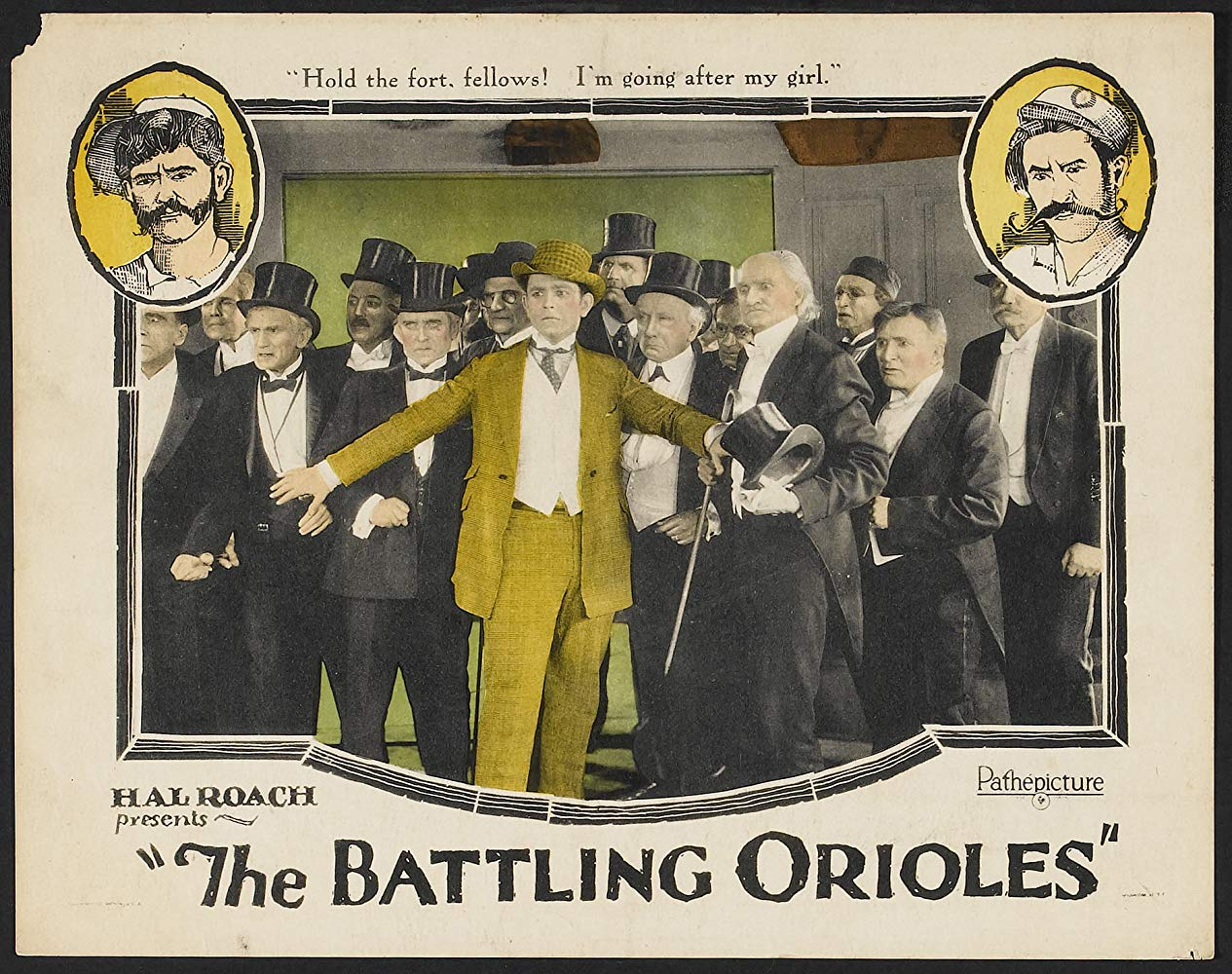
- Lobby card
- Directed by: Fred Guiol; Ted Wilde
- Written by: Hal Roach
- Produced by: Hal Roach
- Starring: Glenn Tryon; Blanche Mehaffey; John T. Prince
- Cinematography: Floyd Jackman; George Stevens
- Production company: Hal Roach Studios
- Distributed by: Pathé Exchange
- Release date: October 6, 1924
- Running time: 60 minutes
- Country: United States
- Language: Silent (English intertitles)

Battling Orioles is a 1924 American silent comedy film directed by Fred Guiol and Ted Wilde and starring Glenn Tryon, Blanche Mehaffey, and John T. Prince. Prints of Battling Orioles exist.

== Plot ==
When a young barber's girlfriend is effectively kidnapped by dishonest owner of a nightclub, he enlists the help of his father and his old professional baseball teammates to rescue her.

== Cast ==
- Glenn Tryon as Tommy Roosevelt Tucker
- Blanche Mehaffey as Hope Stanton
- John T. Prince as 'Cappy' Wolfe
- Noah Young as Sid Stanton
- Sam Lufkin as Jimmy
- Robert Page as Inspector Joslin

== See also ==
- List of baseball films

== Bibliography ==
- Munden, Kenneth White. The American Film Institute Catalog of Motion Pictures Produced in the United States, Part 1. University of California Press, 1997.
