= The Call of Courage =

1925 film

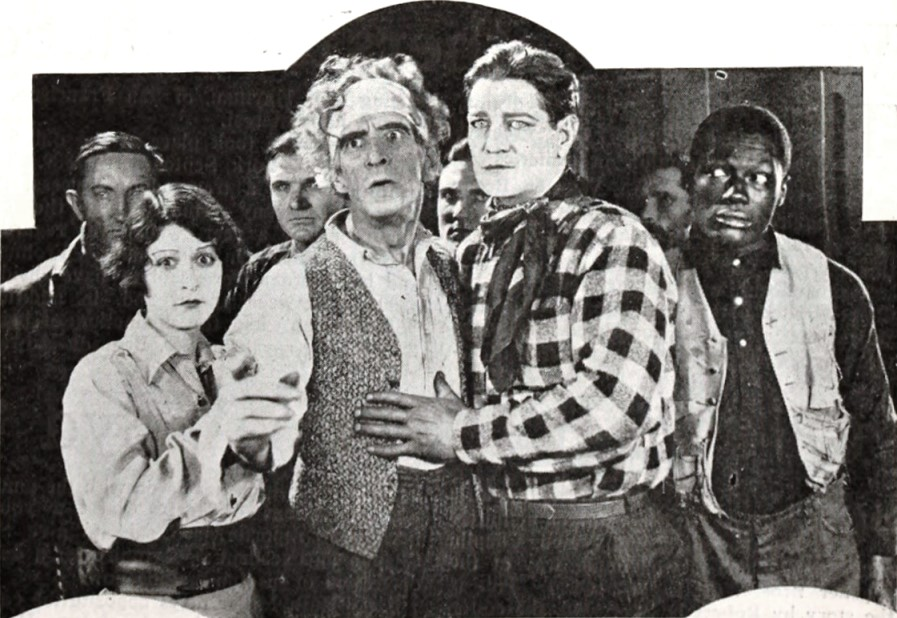
- Still with Olive Hasbrouck, John T. Prince, Art Acord, and Floyd Shackelford
- Directed by: Clifford Smith
- Screenplay by: Harold Shumate
- Starring: Art Acord; Olive Hasbrouck; Duke R. Lee; Frank Rice; John T. Prince; Turner Savage
- Cinematography: Abe Fried
- Production company: Universal Pictures
- Distributed by: Universal Pictures
- Release date: December 22, 1925
- Running time: 50 minutes
- Country: United States
- Language: Silent (English intertitles)

The Call of Courage is a 1925 American silent Western film directed by Clifford Smith and written by Harold Shumate. The film stars Art Acord, Olive Hasbrouck, Duke R. Lee, Frank Rice, John T. Prince, and Turner Savage. The film was released on December 22, 1925, by Universal Pictures.

== Cast ==
- Art Acord as Steve Caldwell
- Olive Hasbrouck as June Hazelton
- Duke R. Lee as Sam Caldwell
- Frank Rice as Slim
- John T. Prince as Jeff Hazelton
- Turner Savage as Jimmy
- Floyd Shackelford as Ranch Cook
- Mrs. Chris-Pin Martin as Housekeeper
- Rex the Dog as Rex
- Raven the Horse as Raven

== Preservation ==
With no holdings located in archives, The Call of Courage is considered a lost film.
