= Little Eva Ascends =

1922 film

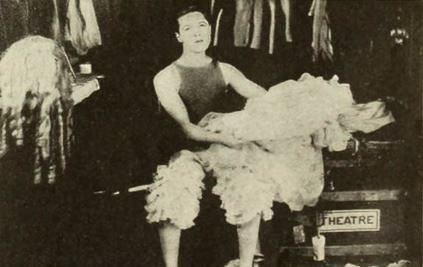
- Directed by: George D. Baker
- Written by: Thomas Beer
- Starring: Gareth Hughes; Elinor Field; May Collins
- Cinematography: Rudolph J. Bergquist
- Production company: Sawyer-Lubin Pictures Corporation
- Distributed by: Metro Pictures
- Release date: January 8, 1922
- Running time: 60 minutes
- Country: United States
- Languages: Silent; English intertitles

Little Eva Ascends is a 1922 American silent comedy film directed by George D. Baker and starring Gareth Hughes, Elinor Field and May Collins. While not credited, prolific studio writer Winifred Dunn may have worked on the film.

== Cast ==
- Gareth Hughes as Roy St. George
- Elinor Field as Mattie Moore
- May Collins as Priscilla Price
- Eunice Murdock Moore as Blanche St. George
- Ben Hagerty as John St. George
- Edward Martindel as Mr. Wilson
- Harry Lorraine as Junius Brutus
- Mark Fenton as Mr. Moore
- John T. Prince as Mr. Price
- Fred Warren as Montgomery Murphy
- William H. Brown as Richard Bansfield

== Preservation ==
In February of 2021, Little Eva Ascends was cited by the National Film Preservation Board on their Lost U.S. Silent Feature Films list and is therefore presumed lost.

== Bibliography ==
- Connelly, Robert B. The Silents: Silent Feature Films, 1910-36, Volume 40, Issue 2. December Press, 1998.
- Munden, Kenneth White. The American Film Institute Catalog of Motion Pictures Produced in the United States, Part 1. University of California Press, 1997.
