= The Haunted Honeymoon =

1925 film

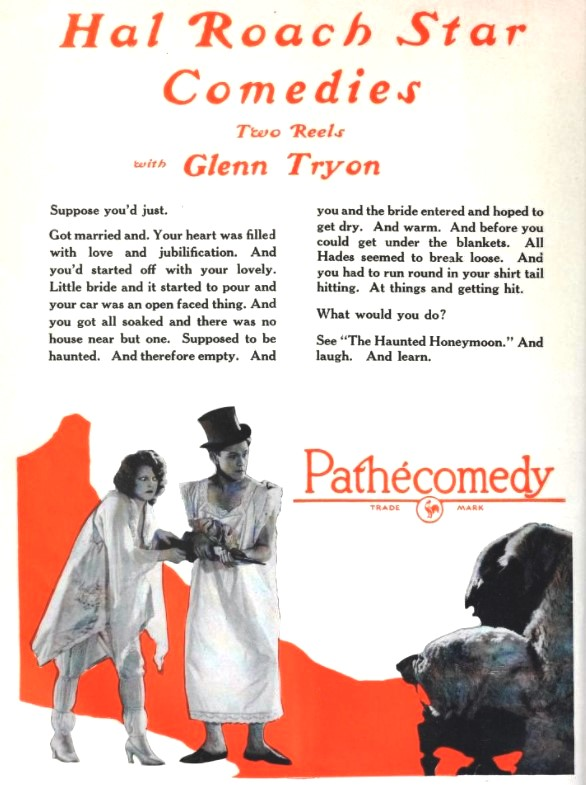
- Advertisement
- Directed by: Fred Guiol; Ted Wilde
- Written by: Fred Guiol
- Produced by: Hal Roach
- Starring: Glenn Tryon; Blanche Mehaffey; James Finlayson
- Distributed by: Pathé Exchange
- Release date: 1925
- Running time: 2 reels
- Country: United States
- Language: Silent (English intertitles)

The Haunted Honeymoon is a 1925 American silent comedy film directed by Fred Guiol and Ted Wilde, starring Glenn Tryon and Blanche Mehaffey, with Janet Gaynor in one of her first films. One of the first comedies to parody horror films, it was produced by Hal Roach and released by Pathé Exchange.

== Cast ==
- Glenn Tryon
- Blanche Mehaffey
- James Finlayson
- Yorke Sherwood
- George Rowe
- Helen Gilmore
- Jules Mendel
- Janet Gaynor (uncredited)
