= The Cossacks (1928 film) =

1928 film

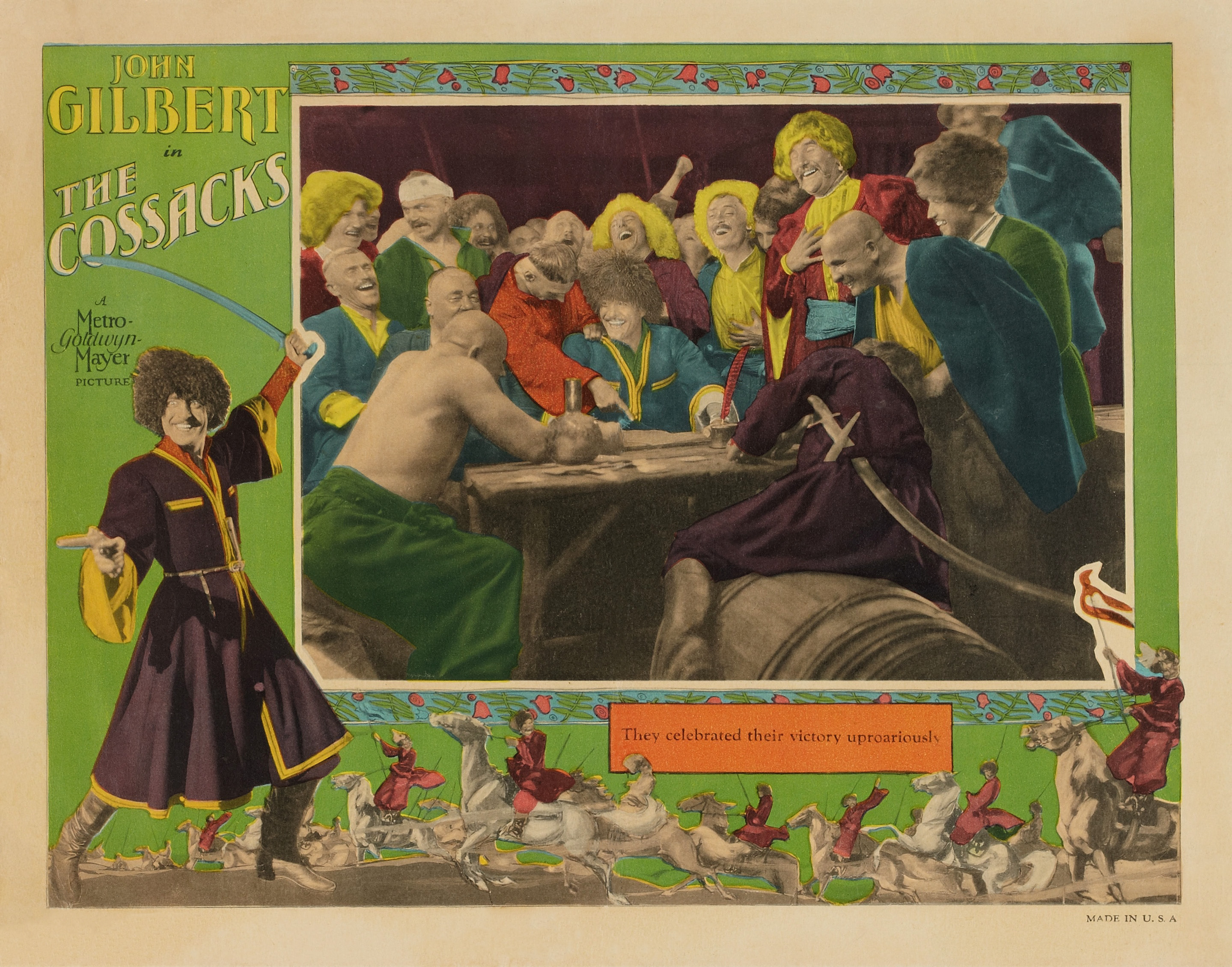
- Directed by: George W. Hill; Clarence Brown
- Written by: Frances Marion (adaptation); John Colton (intertitles)
- Screenplay by: Frances Marion
- Based on: The Cossacks; 1864 novel by Leo Tolstoy
- Starring: John Gilbert; Renée Adorée
- Cinematography: Percy Hilburn (*French)
- Edited by: Blanche Sewell
- Music by: William Axt; Paul Lamkoff
- Distributed by: Metro-Goldwyn-Mayer
- Release date: June 23, 1928
- Running time: 94 minutes
- Country: United States
- Languages: Silent version Sound version (Synchronized) (English Intertitles)
- Budget: $694,000
- Box office: $1.3 million (worldwide rentals)

The Cossacks is a 1928 American silent drama film produced and distributed by Metro-Goldwyn-Mayer (MGM) and directed by George Hill and Clarence Brown. Due to the public apathy towards silent films, a sound version was also prepared. While the sound version has no audible dialog, it was released with a synchronized musical score with sound effects using both the sound-on-disc and sound-on-film process. The film stars John Gilbert and Renée Adorée and is based on the 1863 novel The Cossacks by Leo Tolstoy.

== Plot ==
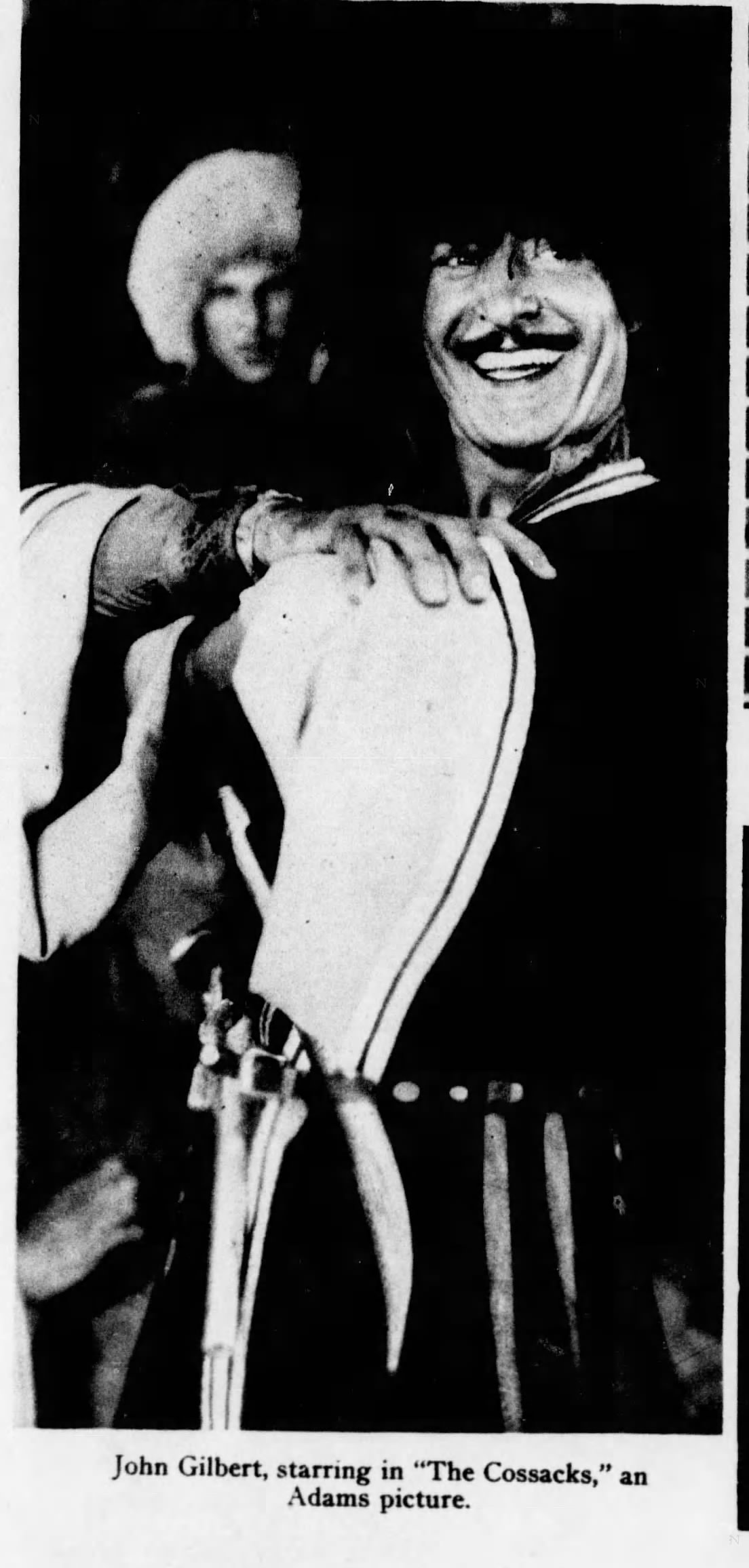
promotional photograph of Gilbert as Lukashka

For centuries under the Tsardom of Russia, the Cossacks were stationed as a military force to combat the Turkish people. Ivan, the Ataman, leads a victorious army into their village after a successful military campaign, with Turkish prisoners of war. They celebrate their victory at a tavern and show reverence to God when the church bell rings. Ivan returns home where he mocks his son Lukashka for his pacifism. Later that night, Lukashka meets with his childhood friend Maryana, who wishes he would become a soldier. Other men in the village mock Lukashka for his pacifism by dressing him in a feminine garment, strap him to a pole, and throw grapes at him. Maryana, who despises Lukashka's pacifism, joins in.

Humiliated, Lukashka returns home and fights his father, overpowering him in the process. Shortly after, the Turkish prisoners escape. Determined to prove his bravery, Lukashka chases them. He shoots two and strangles their leader to death. The next morning, the Cossacks are called into battle again, and Lukashka joins them as a soldier. Before departing, Maryana pleads for Lukashka to return home alive, but he repeatedly ignores her. Sometime later, Prince Olenin arrives in the village where he has been ordered by the Tsar to marry a Cossack woman. Olenin stays at a local tavern, where he falls in love with Maryana, who works there as a maid. However, she resists his charms.

One night, the Cossack camp are attacked by the Turks and a fierce battle ensues. Back at the tavern, Olenin catches Maryana wearing one of his shawls. He corrects her, and soon proposes to her. She rejects his proposal, vowing only to marry a Cossack. Meanwhile, Lukashka returns home triumphant and meets with Maryana at the tavern. He states he had killed ten Turks, but he leaves the tavern after he learns Olenin had proposed to Maryana.

During a festival, Olenin reads a letter from the Tsar, stating a Cossack woman will be married to him and the Tsar has made peace with the Turks, thereby ending the Cossacks' military campaign. This angers Ivan, who states the war effort has always been their livelihood. Hoping to break the peace agreement, Lukashka writes an insulting letter to the Sultan, using the Tsar's name in the process. Immediately after, the Cossacks party with vodka and Gypsy women. Outside, Lukashka kisses one, breaking Maryana's heart. She returns home and decides to marry Olenin.

Olenin and Maryana marry. Lukashka arrives, and strikes Maryana in jealousy. Later that day, Lukashka tries to repair his relationship with Maryana, but she decides to remain with Olenin. After being convinced by his father, Lukashka decides to chase after Maryana, who is being escorted to Moscow with her new husband. Along the way, Olenin's carriage is attacked by Turks. They kill him and they abduct his carriage, with Maryana still inside. Lukashka and Ivan attempt to fight off the Turks, but are captured and brought before the Sultan. They refuse to kneel and are whipped and tortured.

A Cossack cavalry arrives and fights the Turks. Lukashka and Ivan are freed, but Ivan has died from the torture ordeal. Lukashka and the Cossacks return to their village victorious, and Maryana vows to be Lukashka's wife.

== Cast ==
- John Gilbert as Lukashka
- Renée Adorée as Maryana
- Ernest Torrence as Ivan
- Nils Asther as Prince Olenin Stieshneff
- Paul Hurst as Sitchi
- Dale Fuller as Ulitka, Maryana's mother
- Mary Alden as Lukashka's mother
- Josephine Borio as Stepka (uncredited)
- Yorke Sherwood as Uncle Eroshka (uncredited)
- Joseph Mari as Turkish Spy (uncredited)
- Paul Hurst as Zarka (uncredited)
- Sidney Bracey as Koozma, Prince Olenin's Orderly (uncredited)
- Lou Costello as Extra (uncredited)
- Charles Darvas as Extra (uncredited)
- Helena Dime as Minor Role (uncredited)
- George Goforth as Tavern Keeper (uncredited)
- Neil Neely as Secondary Role (uncredited)
- Russ Powell as Cossack (uncredited)

== Music ==
The sound version of the film featured a theme song entitled "Maryana" which was composed by Ted Pola and Eddie Brandt.

== Production ==
The Cossacks was beset with problems due to MGM executives requesting various script changes during filming. Frances Marion, who wrote the screenplay, became frustrated by the numerous requests and later said she "lost track of what the story was really about and the material seemed frayed on all edges." The film's stars, John Gilbert and Renée Adorée, complained about the numerous rewrites and felt their roles were "not worthy".

Before filming completed, George W. Hill requested that he be removed as director as he did not like the film's subject matter and had tired of Gilbert and Adorée's complaints. Clarence Brown was then hired to reshoot several scenes and ultimately completed the film.

Among the many extras used in The Cossacks were members of a "Dijigit Troupe" of over 100 genuine Russian Cossacks, who in 1926 came to the United States from Europe after performing equestrian exhibitions and traditional Cossack musical and dance shows in various cities in France and England. Once the troupe arrived in the United States, MGM contracted some of its horsemen to perform as trick riders and as doubles in several of the studio's films in 1927 and 1928, including The Gaucho and The Cossacks. In its review of The Cossacks in June 1928, the American entertainment trade publication Variety notes the use of these Russian extras and their contributions to enhancing the authentic "look" of the film. Variety also comments on the equestrian exhibition, "the fiasco", that the Cossack troupe had presented in New York at Madison Square Garden before some of its performers continued to California, where MGM crews had constructed elaborate location sets for the Cossacks in Laurel Canyon:

The Cossack village [built by MGM] is a faithful reproduction of the real thing. Superb horsemanship. The riders are mostly real Russians who came to this country to work in this picture and stopped en route to Hollywood to pull the most gigantic flop that Madison Square Garden has yet housed. The survivors of the fiasco finally reached the coast and are present in this film.

== Reception ==
The Cossacks received mixed reviews from critics upon its release in 1928. Variety gave generally high marks to the actors' performances and to the film's overall production values:

The flaps, who want to see John Gilbert mauling some dame in hot love scenes may not fancy this M-G-M as much as some of his former releases, but picture lovers and adults will find plenty of entertainment in the beautiful photography, production and story...[Gilbert] gives a splendid performance as does Ernest Torrence who shaved his dome for this one. Mary Alden as the mother also rings the bell. Miss Adoree is winsome and sweet as the little reason for it all and Neil Neely ought to boost the tourist travel of school teachers into the land of the Soviet.

Mordaunt Hall, the influential film critic for The New York Times in 1928, viewed Gilbert's performance quite differently. Hall disparaged the actor's interpretation of Lukashka, both in his portrayal of the character's temperament and physical appearance:

Mr. Gilbert is much too gay for the character. His laughter is hollow. He is stirred to merriment by actions that would hardly provoke a smile, and in more serious moments he appears to be self-conscious. He never appeals to one as the son of a Cossack chieftain, despite the fact that at the outset this Lukashka is looked upon by the Cossacks and their women as a "woman man." He does not like the smell of blood, preferring peace and meditation on his handsome appearance. He is brought to another line of thought after men and women of the Cossack community have dressed him in a woman's apron and thrown grapes in his face...This picture is not particularly stirring, not nearly so much as it might have been. Had Mr. Gilbert's acting been equal to that of Ernest Torrence [or] René Adorée this film would have gained considerable power. Mr. Gilbert might also have permitted a day or two of beard to grow during some emergencies.

The film earned rentals of $747,000 in the United States and Canada and foreign rentals of $588,000 for a total of $1,335,000.
