= Yorke Sherwood =

English actor (1873–1956)

Yorke Sherwood (14 December 1873 – 27 September 1958) was an English actor.

== Life ==
Yorke Sherwood was born Herbert Edmund Sherwood in Manchester on 14 December 1873. He moved to California in the 1920s and had multiple roles in Mack Sennett films often supporting Harry Langdon, then at Hal Roach's studio in 1925-1926. Sherwood kept playing supporting roles after the silent era. He was often cast to play English characters in Hollywood films.

The actor, who had to shave his head to play Uncle Eroshka in The Cossacks (in 1928) noted with a touch of humour that he had to do it again for his role in The Unholy Night in 1929: "Whatever I play, I seem to always lose my hair". He is described as a "large-sized, squared-headed British character actor".

He died in Hollywood, at age 84.

Feet of Mud, (1924), in which Sherwood played the father

== Partial filmography ==
- The Luck o' the Foolish (1924); dur. 20 min 50 (uncredited)
- Wandering Waistlines (1924 ); 2 reels
- Love's Sweet Piffle (1924); Sennett production, directed by Edward Kennedy
- Feet of Mud (1924), dur. 17 min 24
- Giddap! (1925) as Cornelius Marblehead, directed by Del Lord co-starring role with Billy Bevan
- Laughing Ladies (1925) as Policeman; Hal Roach production, directed by James W. Horne, dur. 19 min 23
- The Haunted Honeymoon (1925); one reel
- Cupid's Boots (1925)
- When a Man's a Prince (1926) as Jake/King of Westphalia; dur. 15 min.
- Don Key (1926) aka Son of Burro dur. 20 min 50
- The Cossacks (1928)
- He Forgot to Remember (1926) as Cannon-ball O'Sorghum, Commanding officer of the Cavalry Camp, directed by Tom Buckingham
- The Man in the Saddle (1926)
- Gentlemen Prefer Blondes (1928)
- Thief in the Dark (1928)
- Temple Tower (1930)
- The Man from Blankley's (1930)
- The Lion and the Lamb (1931)
- The Man in Possession (1931)
- Cavalcade (1933)(uncredited)
- The Eagle and the Hawk (1933) (uncredited)
- A Study in Scarlet (1933)
- Ever Since Eve (1934)(uncredited)
- One More River (1934) (uncredited)
- Bulldog Drummond Strikes Back (1934)(uncredited)
- Treasure Island (1934)(uncredited)
- Father Brown, Detective (1934) (uncredited)
- Clive of India (1935) (uncredited)
- David Copperfield (1935), as Quinion (uncredited)
- Folies Bergère de Paris (1935) (uncredited)
- Thanks A Million (1935), as the Campaign manager (uncredited)
- The Perfect Gentleman (1935)(uncredited)
- King Lady (1935) (uncredited)
- Till We Meet Again (1936) (uncredited)
- The Unguarded Hour (1936)
- A Message to Garcia (1936) (uncredited)
- The White Angel (1936) (uncredited)
- Love on the Run (1936) (uncredited)
- Lloyd's of London (1936), as Dr. Johnson
- Camille (1936) (uncredited)
- Quality Street (1937) (uncredited)
- The Prince and the Pauper (1937)(uncredited)
- Parnell (1937) (uncredited)
- Another Dawn (1937) (uncredited)
- London by Night (1937) (uncredited)
- Mysterious Mr. Moto (1938) (uncredited)
- Scotland Yard (1941) (uncredited)
- Dr. Jekyll and Mr. Hyde (1941)(uncredited)
- Random Harvest (1942) (uncredited)
- Two Tickets to London (1943)(uncredited)
- Holy Matrimony (1943)
- Jane Eyre (1944) (uncredited)
- The Lodger (1944) (uncredited)
- The Invisible Man's Revenge (1944), as Jim Yarrow (uncredited)
- None But the Lonely Heart (1944)(uncredited)
- Devotion (1946) (uncredited)
- San Diego, I Love You (1945)(uncredited)
- Gaby (1956) (uncredited)
- 23 Paces to Baker Street (1956) (uncredited)
