= Clancy in Wall Street =

1930 film by Ted Wilde

- Directed by: Ted Wilde
- Based on: Story by Jack Wagner; Ralph Bell
- Produced by: Edward Small
- Cinematography: Harry Jackson
- Edited by: Phil Cahn
- Production company: Edward Small Productions
- Distributed by: Aristocrat Pictures
- Release date: March 15, 1930
- Running time: 76 minutes
- Country: United States
- Language: English

The film

Clancy in Wall Street is a 1930 American pre-Code comedy film. It stars Charles Murray, who had made a number of films for Edward Small.

It was also known as Clancy Caught Short and was described as the first comedy about the stock market crash. It was the last film for director Ted Wilde, who had died in December of the previous year.

== Plot ==
Plumber Michael Clancy, fixing up some pipe on the stock exchange, accidentally buys some stock and makes a quick $200 on a 20 percent margin. He wants to continue but his partner, Andy MacIntosh, refuses to get involved. Clancy makes a fortune, leaves his business, and crashes high society, ignoring his old friend, and urging his daughter, Katie, to reject MacIntosh's son in favor of Freddie Saunders. Then the stock market crashes.

== Cast ==
- Charles Murray as Michael Clancy
- Aggie Herring as Mrs. Clancy
- Lucien Littlefield as Andy MacIntosh
- Edward Nugent as Donald MacIntosh
- Miriam Seegar as Katie Clancy
- Reed Howes as Freddie Saunders
