= Ted Wilde =

American film director, screenwriter

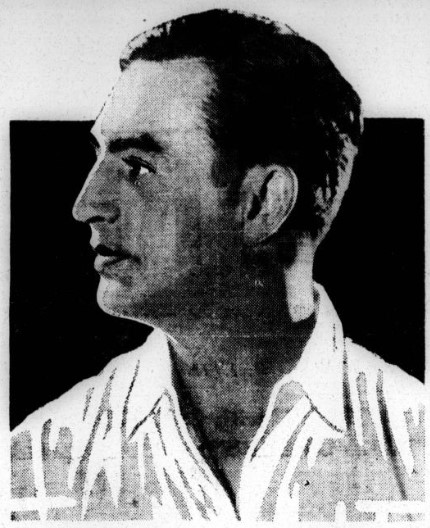
From a 1926 publication

Ted Wilde (1892 or 1893 – December 17, 1929) was an American comedy writer and director during the era of silent movies, though he also directed two talkies released in 1930. He was born in New York City. His initial career was as a member of Harold Lloyd's writing staff. His final film as a director was Clancy in Wall Street. He died of a stroke in Hollywood at the age of 36 and was interred in the Forest Lawn Memorial Park Cemetery in Glendale, California.

== Awards ==
At the 1st Academy Awards on May 16, 1929, Wilde was nominated as Best Director of a Comedy Picture for the film Speedy but lost to Lewis Milestone for Two Arabian Knights.

== Filmography ==
- The Battling Orioles (1924)
- The Goofy Age (1924)
- A Sailor Papa (1925)
- The Haunted Honeymoon (1925)
- The Kid Brother (1927)
- Babe Comes Home (1927)
- Speedy (1928)
- Loose Ankles (1930)
- Clancy in Wall Street (1930)
