= Giddap! =

1925 American silent comedy film

- Title card
- Directed by: Del Lord
- Screenplay by: Del Lord
- Story by: from a story written by Felix Adler and Jefferson Moffitt
- Produced by: Mack Sennett
- Starring: Billy Bevan; Yorke Sherwood; Helen Mehrmann; Kathryn McGuire
- Distributed by: Pathe
- Release date: 1925
- Country: United States
- Language: English

Giddap! is a 1925 American silent comedy film directed by Del Lord. A Mack Sennett production for Pathe films, it stars Billy Bevan and Yorke Sherwood in the lead roles. The cast also features Helen Mehrmann and Kathryn McGuire. The film had two reels, only one of which seems to have been preserved. The film was released on 23 March 1925. It revolves around two men, Gaspard (played by Bevan) and Cornelius (played by Sherwood) trying to justify bruises they received during a Purity League raid.

== Plot ==
Gaspard De Brie and Cornelius Marblehead are embarrassed to explain to their wives why they both have black eyes: they invent heroic actions to that effect; the latter takes advantage of a news he catches in the newspaper someone is reading by his side and explains he is the unknown hero who saved a child from being run over by a horse, while the first claims he did the same thing, only with three children, and three horses. But newsreel footage depicting a Purity League raid reveals the truth.

Both men then engage in a wild polo game that ends up on the streets of the city and inside a house.

== Cast ==
The cast included:

- Billy Bevan as Gaspard De Brie
- Helen Mehrmann as Mrs. De Brie
- Yorke Sherwood as Cornelius Marblehead
- Kathryn McGuire as Mrs. Marblehead
- Andy Clyde
- Madeline Hurlock
- Louise Carver
- Barney Helium
- Cecille Evans
- Elsie Tarro

== Production ==
"Del Lord is credited as director on the main title sheet, but there is no mention in the file of any other director. According to Del Lord’s contract, however, he replaced Ralph Ceder.", wrote Warren M. Sherk.

The film's working title was Bevan Polo Story. It was shot in Los Angeles (stables near Los Feliz Boulevard, near Los Angeles River; Riverside Drive; Glendale Boulevard and Griffith Park).

Still according to Sherk, earlier versions of the script were made for Ralph Graves, Harry Langdon, Alice Day, Natalie Kingston, Thelma Hill and Mack Sennett.

== Reception ==
A review by T.C. Kennedy in Motion Pictures News from June 1925 wrote: "It is out-and-out slap-stick, well done and, introducing several rather clever gags, we enjoyed it immensely".

In his book about Sennett, Brent E. Walker highly praised the film, in particular the polo chase.

== Release ==
The film was released on 23 March 1925.

== Preservation ==
Some sources indicate that the film is incompletely preserved (one reel only).

The National Film and Sound Archive of Australia lists one preserved reel, under the title Polo Pinheads, as an abridged version of the short.

== Links ==
- Giddap! (Short 1925) at IMDb
- A 12 min version of the film
