= The Man from Monterey =

1933 film

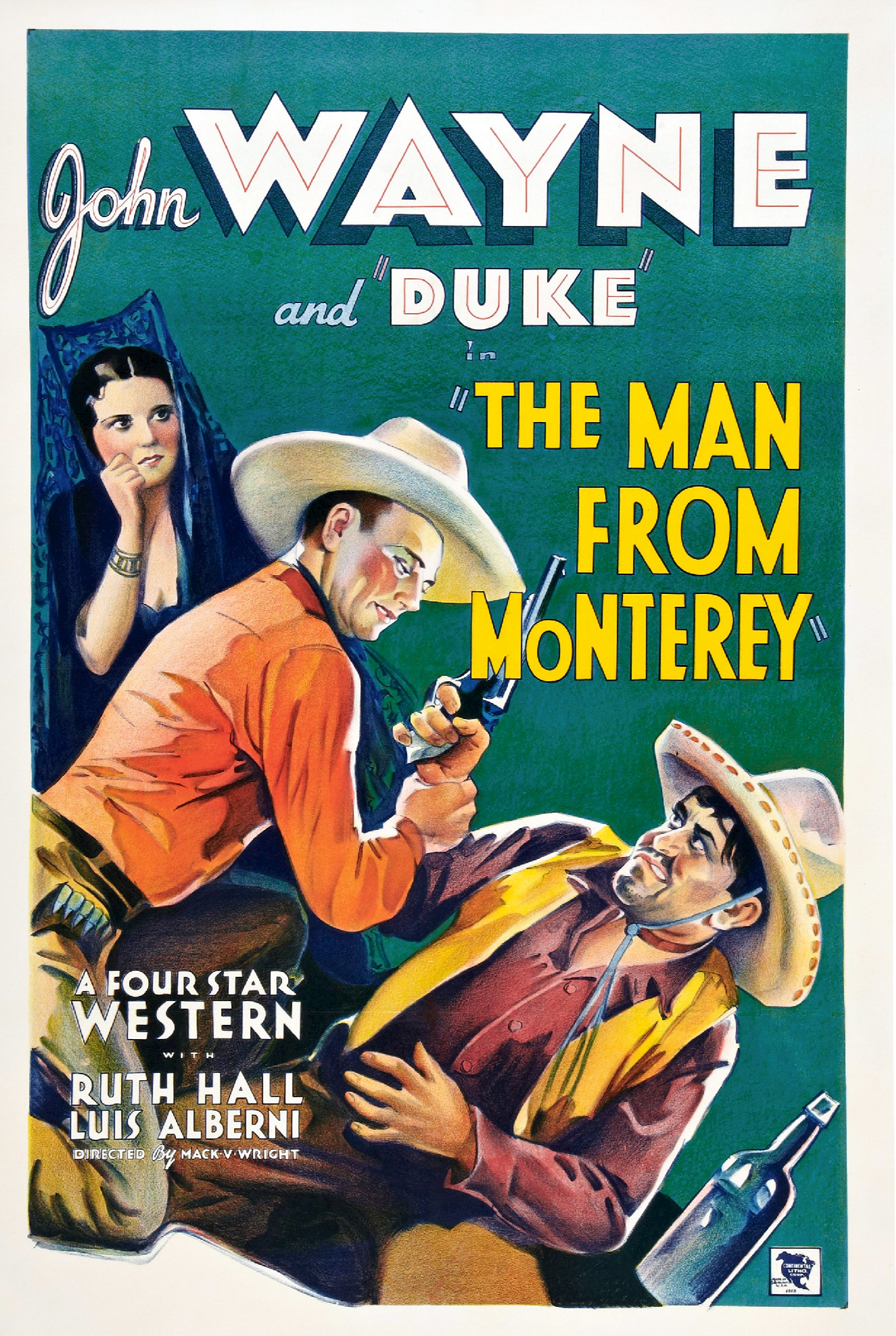
- Theatrical poster to The Man from Monterey (1933)
- Directed by: Mack V. Wright
- Written by: Leslie Mason
- Produced by: Sid Rogell; Leon Schlesinger
- Starring: John Wayne; Ruth Hall; Luis Alberni
- Cinematography: Ted D. McCord
- Edited by: William Clemens
- Production company: Leon Schlesinger Productions
- Distributed by: Warner Bros. Pictures
- Release date: July 15, 1933
- Running time: 57 minutes
- Country: United States
- Language: English
- Budget: $28,000
- Box office: $193,000

The Man from Monterey is a 1933 American pre-Code Western directed by Mack V. Wright and starring John Wayne. The picture was released by Warner Bros. Pictures. This film was the last of six live-action films starring John Wayne and produced by Leon Schlesinger Productions between 1932 and 1933, as the latter moved on from live-action productions to focus on its Looney Tunes and Merrie Melodies series.

The opening credit to The Man from Monterey lists the stars as "John Wayne and Duke." That's not a misprint. John Wayne became known as The Duke later in his career, of course, but he appeared with an equine co-star by the name of Duke (aka Duke the Devil Horse); this was common practice in the days of B-western heroes and in the six films Wayne made for Warner Bros.

== Plot ==
The story is based on the requirement of Spanish land owners in California to register their lands before a deadline and the chicanery practiced by some to prevent registration. U.S. Army Captain John Holmes is dispatched to encourage one of the largest Spanish landowners, Don Jose Castanares, to register before the deadline hoping the other landowners will fall in line. Meanwhile, Don Luis Gonzales and his father, Don Pablo Gonzales plot to acquire the Castanares land by forcing Don Jose's daughter, Delores, to marry Don Luis, and holding Don Jose captive. Holmes and his buddy, Felipe, trick the Gonzaleses and thwart their plans. Holmes, who is attracted to Delores, wins her love.

== Cast ==
- John Wayne as Capt. John Holmes
- Ruth Hall as Dolores Castanares
- Luis Alberni as Felipe Guadalupe Constacio Delgado Santa Cruz de la Verranca
- Donald Reed as Don Luis Gonzales
- Nina Quartero as Anita Garcia
- Francis Ford as Don Pablo Gonzales
- Lafe McKee as Don Jose Castanares
- Lillian Leighton as Juanita
- Slim Whitaker as Jake Morgan
- John T. Prince as Padre

== Box office ==
According to Warner Bros., the film earned $137,000 domestically and $56,000 foreign.

== See also ==
- John Wayne filmography
