= John T. Prince =

American actor (1871–1937)

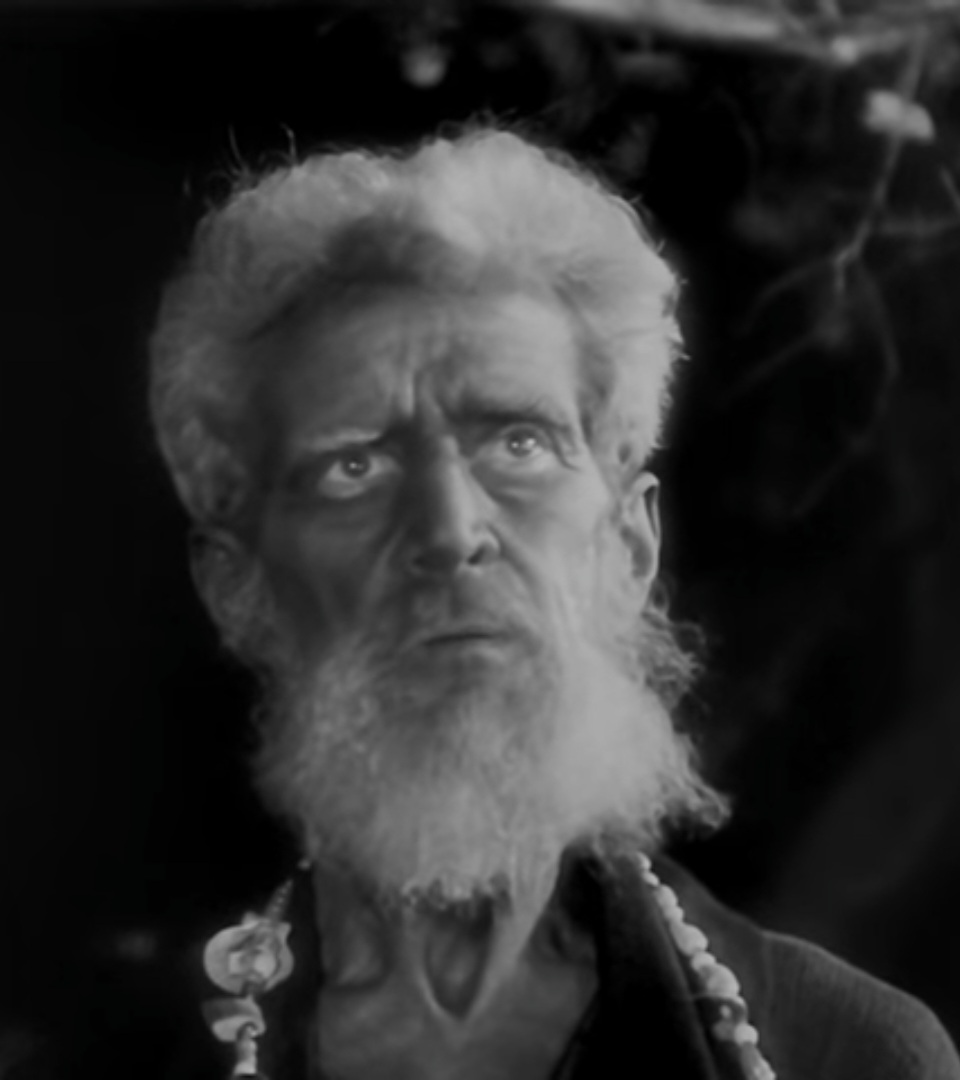
- Prince in White Zombie (1932)
- Born: September 11, 1871; Boston, Massachusetts, U.S.
- Died: December 23, 1937 (aged 66); Los Angeles, California, U.S.
- Other names: John Printz
- Occupation: Actor
- Years active: 1912–1933
- Spouse(s): Kathleen Chambers (m. 19??)

John T. Prince (September 11, 1871 – December 23, 1937), sometimes credited as John Printz, was an American stage and silent film actor. After some years on the stage he appeared in around forty films (including some shorts and serials) from 1912 onwards. He was a character actor appearing in a number of supporting roles. Following the introduction of sound, he appeared mostly in smaller, uncredited parts. His final screen appearance was in the 1933 John Wayne western The Man from Monterey.

He was married to the actress Kathleen Chambers.

== Selected filmography ==
- Little Eva Ascends (1922)
- Dr. Jack (1922)
- East Side - West Side (1923)
- Defying the Law (1924)
- The Battling Orioles (1924)
- Barbara Frietchie (1924)
- Heartless Husbands (1925)
- The Call of Courage (1925)
- Capital Punishment (1925)
- The Lawful Cheater (1925)
- Women and Gold (1925)
- The Radio Detective (1926)
- Dame Chance (1926)
- The Phantom Bullet (1926)
- Money to Burn (1926)
- Prowlers of the Night (1926)
- The King of Kings (1927)
- Hawk of the Hills (1927)
- Haunted Island (1928)
- Ramona (1928)
- The Girl in the Show (1929)
- The Rampant Age (1930)
- Haunted Gold (1932)
- Washington Merry-Go-Round (1932)
- White Zombie (1932)
- The Last Mile (1932)
- The Man from Monterey (1933)

== Bibliography ==
- Katchmer, George A. A Biographical Dictionary of Silent Film Western Actors and Actresses. McFarland, 2015.
