= Ben Hagerty =

American actor

- Born: Benjamin Haggerty
- Occupation: Actor

Benjamin Haggerty, also known as Ben Hagerty (fl. 1920s–40s), was an American film actor who made six films between 1921 and 1949, most of them during the silent film era.

== Biography ==
His first film was the film serial Miracles of the Jungle in 1921, by Selig Polyscope Company, a company for which he made more films in 1921. In 1922, by Sawyer-Lubin Pictures Corporation, appeared in the film Little Eva Ascends. In 1949 he made his last film, Malaya, by Metro-Goldwyn-Mayer, in a small non-credited role. Miracles of the Jungle was marked by an incident: during a scene with a lion, Hagerty was injured, being hospitalized for more than a month, before recovering and returning to the picture.

== Filmography ==
- Miracles of the Jungle (1921)
- Kazan (1921)
- Old Dynamite (1921)
- Brand of Courage (1921)
- Little Eva Ascends (1922)
- Malaya (1949)
