= The Man in the Saddle (1926 film) =

1926 film

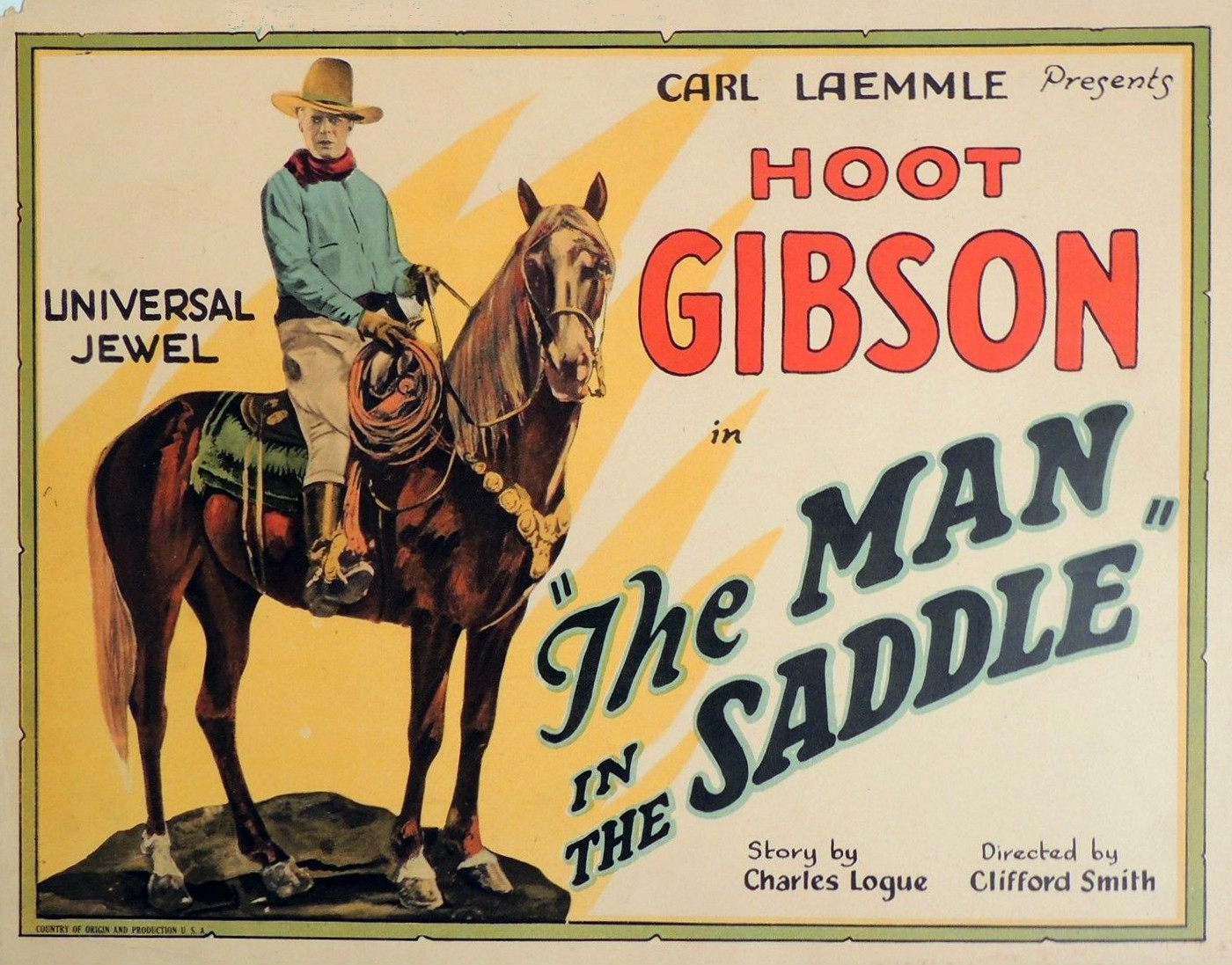
- Lobby card
- Directed by: Lynn Reynolds; Clifford Smith
- Written by: Charles Logue
- Starring: Hoot Gibson; Charles Hill Mailes
- Cinematography: Edward Linden
- Distributed by: Universal Pictures
- Release date: July 11, 1926
- Running time: 60 minutes
- Country: United States
- Language: Silent (English intertitles)

The Man in the Saddle is a 1926 American silent Western film directed by Lynn Reynolds and Clifford Smith, starring Hoot Gibson and featuring Boris Karloff.

== Cast ==
- Hoot Gibson as Jeff Morgan Jr.
- Charles Hill Mailes as Jeff Morgan Sr. (credited as Charles Mailes)
- Clark Comstock as Pete
- Fay Wray as Pauline Stewart
- Sally Long as Laura Mayhew
- Emmett King as Yom Dyresty
- Lloyd Whitlock as Lawrence
- Duke R. Lee as Snell
- Yorke Sherwood as Banker
- William Dyer as Sheriff
- Boris Karloff as Robber
- Janet Gaynor (uncredited)

== Preservation ==
With no prints of The Man in the Saddle located in any film archives, it is a lost film.
