= Miracles of the Jungle =

1921 film

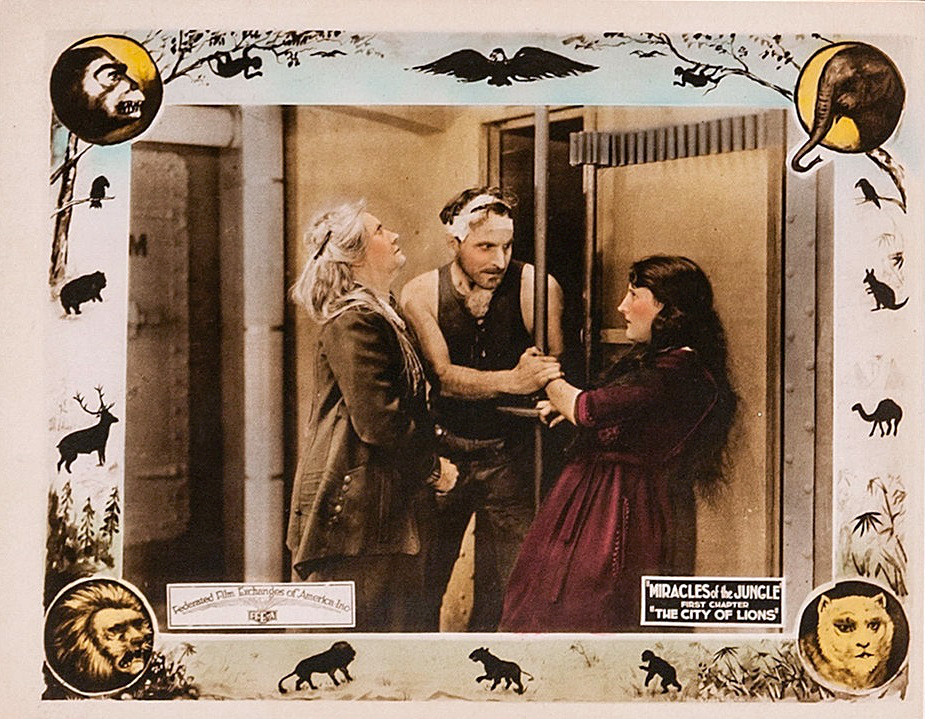
- Lobby card
- Directed by: James Conway; E. A. Martin
- Written by: Emma Bell Clifton (original story); E. A. Martin (adaptation)
- Produced by: William Selig (as William N. Selig)
- Starring: Ben Hagerty; Wilbur Higby; Al Ferguson
- Production companies: Selig Studios; Warner Bros.
- Distributed by: Federated Film Exchanges of America; Warner Bros.
- Release date: May 24, 1921
- Running time: 15 episodes
- Country: United States
- Language: Silent (English intertitles)

Miracles of the Jungle is a 1921 American adventure film serial, directed by James Conway and E. A. Martin, in 15 chapters, starring Ben Hagerty, Wilbur Higby, and Al Ferguson. A co-production by Selig Studios and Warner Bros., it was distributed by the Federated Film Exchanges of America; it originally ran in U.S. theaters between May 24 and August 24, 1921.

This film serial is considered lost.

== Cast ==
- Ben Hagerty as Bob Hathaway
- Wilbur Higby as Tom Cortland
- Al Ferguson as Brian, Red Fox
- Frederick Peters as Zeda, the Zulu
- John George as See'er of All
- Genevieve Bert as Marian Madson
- Irene Wallace as Helen Madson

== Production ==
Through the success of the serial The Lost City, previously made by Selig and Warner, the co-production of Selig Polyscope Company and Warner Bros., Miracles of the Jungle, began. Emma Bell Clifton wrote the original screenplay, which was adapted by E. A. Martin. There were problems during production. William Selig, responsible for the day-to-day filming, accused Warner of inserting spies on the set, and of colluding with distributors to sell the film rights. The production thus dragged on for six months, during which time director E. A. Martin paid attention to the lead actress, with whom he had an affair. Martin's wife confronted him in the studio, and the actress had to stop filming abruptly, necessitating a lot of film ending.

The show was also marred by an incident in which during a scene with a lion, actor Ben Hagerty was injured, which resulted in him being hospitalized for over a month, until he recovered and returned to filming.

== Release ==
The film was given an international release, being released in Brazil under the title Os Milagres da Selva and Milagres do Sertão. It was also released in France in 1922 under the title En Mission au Pays de Fauves.

== Chapter titles ==
1. The City of Lions
2. The Passage of Death
3. The Jungle Attack
4. The Leopard's Revenge
5. The Storm in the Desert
6. To the Rescue
7. The Leopard's Lair
8. Doomed to Death
9. In the Hands of the Apes
10. Midst Raging Tigers
11. Twelve Against One
12. Cheating Death
13. The Heart of an Elephant
14. The Lion's Leap
15. All's Well That Ends Well
