= Feet of Mud =

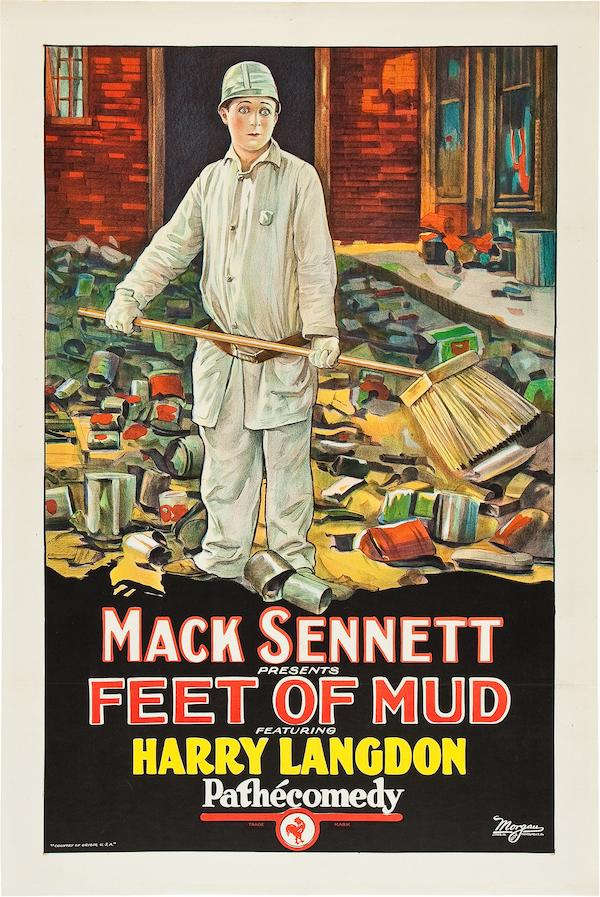
- Directed by: Harry Edwards
- Produced by: Mack Sennett
- Starring: Harry Langdon; Natalie Kingston
- Release date: December 7, 1924
- Running time: 18 minutes
- Country: United States
- Language: Silent (English intertitles)

Feet of Mud is a 1924 silent black and white short film starring Harry Langdon directed by Harry Edwards and produced by Mack Sennett. It was reshown as part of Comedy Capers in a shortened version under the title of The Football Hero.

The title of the film is a parody on Cecil B. DeMille's Feet of Clay, which was released only a few months before. There is no similarity in plot.

== Plot ==
Harold is sitting on the side lines at a college football match. He is dismayed when a player is injured and the coach says he has to play. He removes the cushions from his pants. He uses the excess space to secrete the ball and has to run fast the whole length of the pitch when the whole opposition chase him. The crowd is elated when he scores a touchdown and Nina comes to embrace him, to the anger of Donald her boyfriend. Harold's mother embraces him also.

We are told Nina's father had to have a big house to cover his big cellar. We see a beautiful two storey mansion. Harold is being introduced to Nina's father. He requires any prospective son-in-law to "clean up the street"... He gives him a note to get a job with the City Engineer. The "engineering job" is as a street cleaner in New York City the camera pans out to show Times Square.

We are told that Harold is working his way through college. He has a job cleaning the streets in Chinatown, where he wears a very white uniform with a pith helmet. He brushes some bricks down an open manhole and predictably hits a man on the head. He uses a spike to pick up paper and spikes a policeman in the calf and gets beaten on the backside as a result. The manhole man throws a brick to hit Harry and hits the policeman instead, who thinks Harry threw it. The policeman is arresting him when Harold's mother comes along carrying her Bible. Harry tries to hide behind the policeman, in shame. He escapes into a crowd rushing onto an underground train. He is marked in the moving crowd by his broom held aloft. When he gets to the train he holds the broom horizontally barring his own entry (and the crowd behind). He ends up on the floor pinned by the broom handle over his neck, with people standing on each end. He accidentally pulls the conductor's trousers down. When the crowd rushes off at the next station he is freed momentarily before a new crowd rush on. The next stop is Mott Street. Harry stands at the wrong side of the carriage to get off and misses the stop. He decides to bolt the door for new passengers getting on. As the conductor unbolts it he opens the door on the opposite side and the crowd pass straight through.

He emerges in Chinatown here there is an ongoing Tong War between the Wa-Hoos and the Pa-Jonggs. A group of police beckon Harry over. He runs and hides in a doorway. Someone passes a note from inside: it is in Chinese. He asks a passing Chinese man to translate and the man runs off in horror. A second man does the same but an older man is more polite until Harry shows him where he got the note then he runs off too.

Harry starts cleaning the street. When he bangs his broom on his dustbin the tong gang inside think it is their enemy's gong and bang their own gong. On the street things go crazy and things fly out of the windows messing the whole street. As Harry takes cover a guided tour of Chinatown in a charabang passes through. The tourists are ushered into a building to see the horrors of an opium den. Harry is hiding inside. His mother, Nina, her father and Donald are among the tourists and are shocked, but his mother forgives him. A Chinese man with an axe chases the tourists out for making fun of the Chinese. Nina gets left behind and Harry is sent back to find her. He is chased off by the man with the axe. He goes up the fire escape and falls through a secret door.

He enters a temple-like room and picks up a spear. Carrying the spear over his shoulder he does not see that he has speared a dummy. He thinks he is being followed and attacks it. When the head comes off he realises his mistake.

A Chinese monk appears and starts putting small bowls of burning incense under a line of papier mache heads on a table... Harry is the central head. A Chinese man comes in to pray to Buddha. Harry hits him with the back of the axe and is chased around the table. The man throws the axe and hits a large vase which breaks - revealing Nina inside. Harry and Nina fall through a trapdoor and slide down a chute and land on her father. The father shakes his hand and Harry and Nina kiss.

== Trivia ==
The Harry Langdon Fanclub is named after the film.

== Cast ==
The Film

- Harry Langdon as Harry Holdem the hero
- Florence Lee as his mother
- Natalie Kingston as Nina March, the girl
- Yorke Sherwood as her father, Phillip March
- Malcolm Waite as Donald Duffield, the rival
- Vernon Dent as the Coach
- Leo Sulky as Chinatown Huckster
- Elsie Tarron as a girl
- S. D. Wilcox as the Policeman
