= Speedy (film) =

1928 film

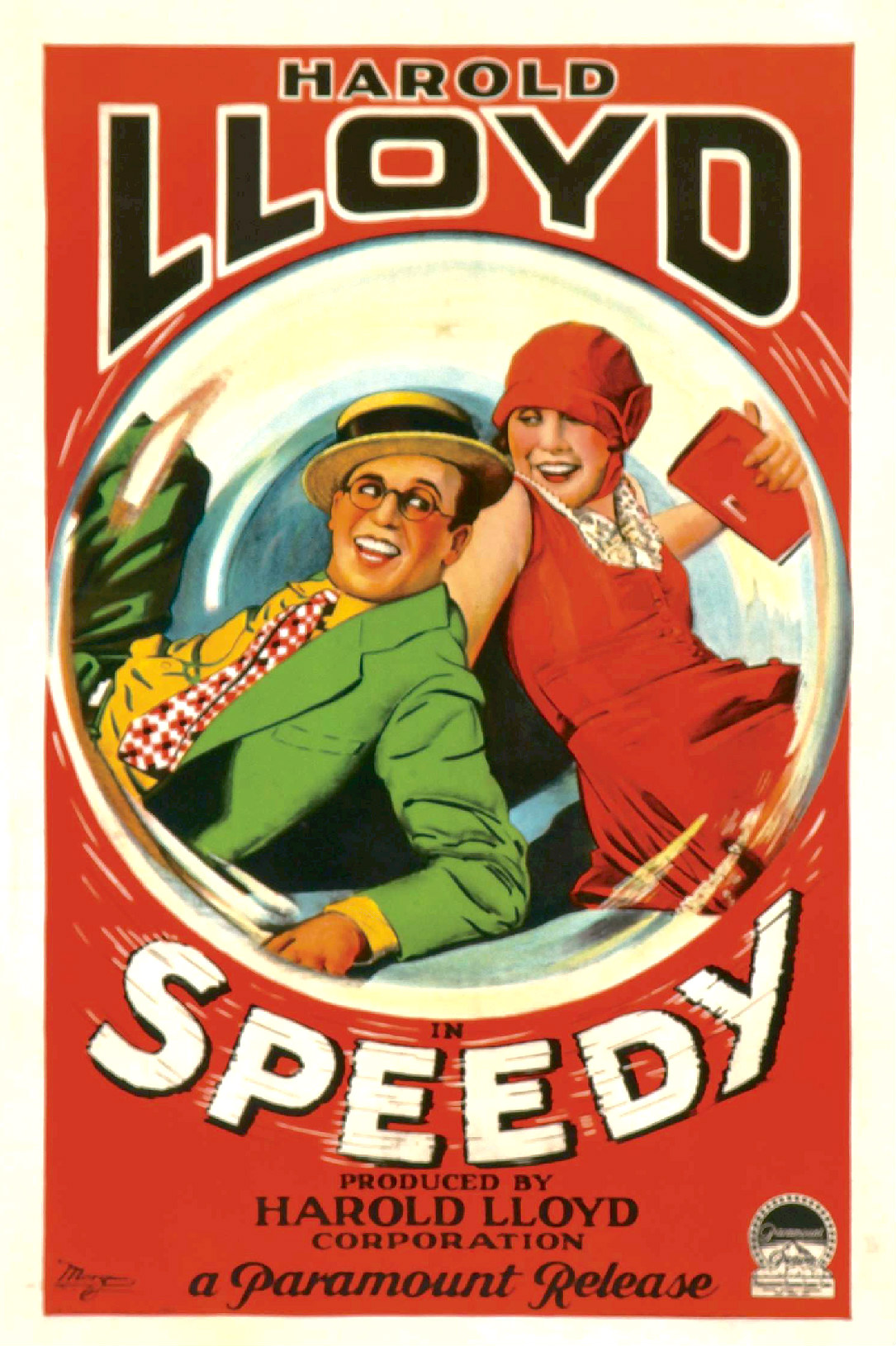
- Poster
- Directed by: Ted Wilde; Clyde Bruckman (sound version, uncredited)
- Written by: Albert DeMond (titles); Al Boasberg; Paul Gerard Smith (dialogue sequences, all uncredited)
- Story by: John Grey; J.A. Howe; Lex Neal; Howard Emmett Rogers
- Produced by: Harold Lloyd
- Starring: Harold Lloyd; Ann Christy; Bert Woodruff; Babe Ruth
- Cinematography: Walter Lundin
- Edited by: Carl Himm
- Music by: Jesse Greer (original film score); Carl Davis (recent); Don Hulette (1974); Don Peake (1974 additional music)
- Production company: Harold Lloyd Corporation
- Distributed by: Paramount Pictures
- Release dates: April 7, 1928 (silent version); December 15, 1928 (reissued with three dialogue sequences)
- Running time: 86 minutes
- Country: United States
- Languages: Silent (Part-Talkie); English

Speedy (full film; silent version)

Speedy is a 1928 American silent comedy film starring comedian Harold Lloyd in the eponymous leading role. It was Lloyd's last silent film before he converted to sound production. Due to the general public's apathy towards silent films, a sound version was prepared and released in the latter half of 1928.

The film was written by Albert DeMond (titles), John Grey (story), J.A. Howe (story), Lex Neal (story) and Howard Emmett Rogers (story) with uncredited assistance from Al Boasberg and Paul Gerard Smith (dialogue sequences). The film was directed by Ted Wilde, the last silent film to be directed by him, and was shot in both Hollywood, and on location in New York City with uncredited assistance from Clyde Bruckman (sound version). The film's copyright was renewed and it entered the public domain on January 1, 2024.

== Plot ==
Everybody in New York City "is in such a hurry that they take Saturday's bath on Friday so they can do Monday's washing on Sunday." But in one slower-paced, "old-fashioned corner of the city," Pop Dillon owns and operates the city's last horse-drawn streetcar. His granddaughter Jane Dillon is in love with Harold "Speedy" Swift.

Speedy, an avid New York Yankees fan, is working at a soda shop. As well as doing his work, he takes frequent telephone calls during Yankees games and passes the line scores on to the kitchen staff by arranging food items in a display case (such as doughnuts for zeroes). But he loses the job after he is ordered to deliver some flowers and lets someone close a car door on them when he gets distracted by a display of baseball scores in a shop window.

Streetcar magnate W.S. Wilton comes to Pop's home to ask for his price to sell the car line, but Speedy spots a newspaper article and realizes that this is part of a plan to form a streetcar monopoly in the city. He surreptitiously raises Pop's written price from $10,000 to $70,000. Wilton angrily refuses and threatens to force Pop out instead.

Speedy is unworried about being unemployed, he is very much used to losing jobs and finding new ones. He and Jane go to Coney Island, where they greatly enjoy themselves despite various mishaps, such as Speedy ruining his suit jacket by leaning against wet paint. On the way home along with a stray dog that decided to follow them, Speedy proposes to Jane, but she will not marry him until her grandfather's affairs are settled.

Speedy is hired as a taxi driver, but for some time a series of mishaps prevents him from actually taking a passenger, and he antagonizes a policeman. Then, to his delight, Babe Ruth hails the cab to get to Yankee Stadium. Although terrified by Speedy's driving, he offers Speedy a ticket to the game, but the taxi owner is there, sees Speedy in the seats when he should be working, and fires him.

At the stadium, Speedy happens to overhear Wilton on the telephone. Wilton has learned that if Pop fails to operate the horsecar every 24 hours he will lose his right to the line, and orders goons to be sent to disrupt the operation. Speedy rushes home and arranges with small-business owners on the street to organize a defense. The goons are beaten off with the help of Speedy's dog, but return and steal the horse and car.

Again helped by his dog, Speedy finds out where the car has been taken and manages to steal it back. In a madcap chase scene, he brings it back across the city to Pop's tracks, stealing fresh horses, tricking police to avoid being stopped, and replacing a broken wheel with a manhole cover lid.

When Wilton sees the horsecar in place, he agrees to meet Pop's price. Speedy says that Pop is a bit deaf and won't hear him until he offers $100,000. Wilton agrees, and Speedy suggests to Jane that they plan a visit to Niagara Falls by horsecar.

== Cast ==
- Harold Lloyd as Harold "Speedy" Swift
- Ann Christy as Jane Dillon
- Bert Woodruff as Pop Dillon, Her Granddaddy
- Byron Douglas as W.S. Wilton
- Brooks Benedict as Steve Carter
- Steve Murphy as Gangster
- Babe Ruth as Himself

== Music ==
A theme song entitled “Speedy Boy” was composed by Raymond Klages (words) and Jesse Greer (music) and was released on phonograph records and sheet music at the time of the film's release.

In addition to sequences with audible dialogue or talking sequences, the sound version of the film featured a synchronized musical score and sound effects along with English intertitles. The soundtrack was recorded using the Western Electric sound-on-film system.

== Production ==
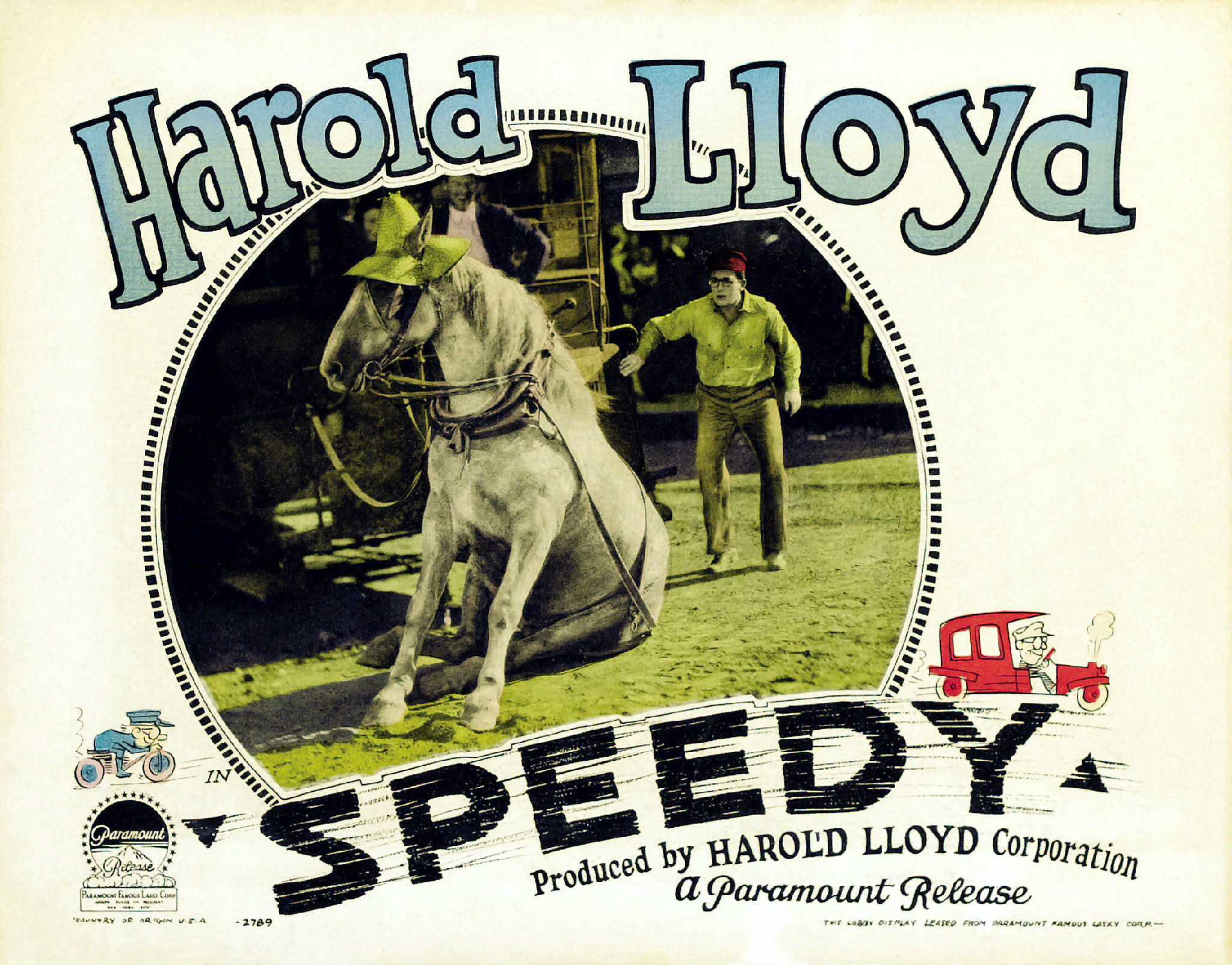
Lobby card

Location shooting for the Coney Island scenes cost a reported $150,000. Then they reissued in December 1928 and re-filmed with three dialogue sequences are taken on July 12, 1928.

=== Yankees cameos ===
At the end of the scene where Speedy gives Babe Ruth a ride in his taxi, Lou Gehrig, Ruth's famous New York Yankee teammate, walks by the far side of Speedy's cab, looks directly at the camera through the taxi's window, and sticks out his tongue. Gehrig is on screen for about three seconds. Ruth and Gehrig's teammate, Bob Meusel, is also seen in the film batting after Ruth hits a home run at the game Harold attends. Meusel's at bat was not filmed for the movie but was taken from newsreel footage.

== Reception ==
Ted Wilde, the director of the film, was nominated for the Academy Award for Best Director of a Comedy, which was used during the 1st Academy Awards. He lost to Lewis Milestone, the director of Two Arabian Knights.

In 2025, The Hollywood Reporter listed Speedy as having the best stunts of 1928 to 1929.

== Preservation status ==
Both the silent and sound-on-film versions survive complete and preserved by the UCLA Film & Television Archive. The film's trailer and the 16" soundtrack discs also survive.

== See also ==
- Harold Lloyd filmography
- List of early sound feature films (1926–1929)
- List of United States comedy films
