= Thundering Hoofs =

Thundering Hoofs may refer to:

- Thundering Hoofs (1922 film), an American silent drama film
- Thundering Hoofs (1924 film), an American silent Western film
- Thundering Hoofs (1942 film), an American Western film
