= Eugénie Grandet =

1834 novel by Honoré de Balzac

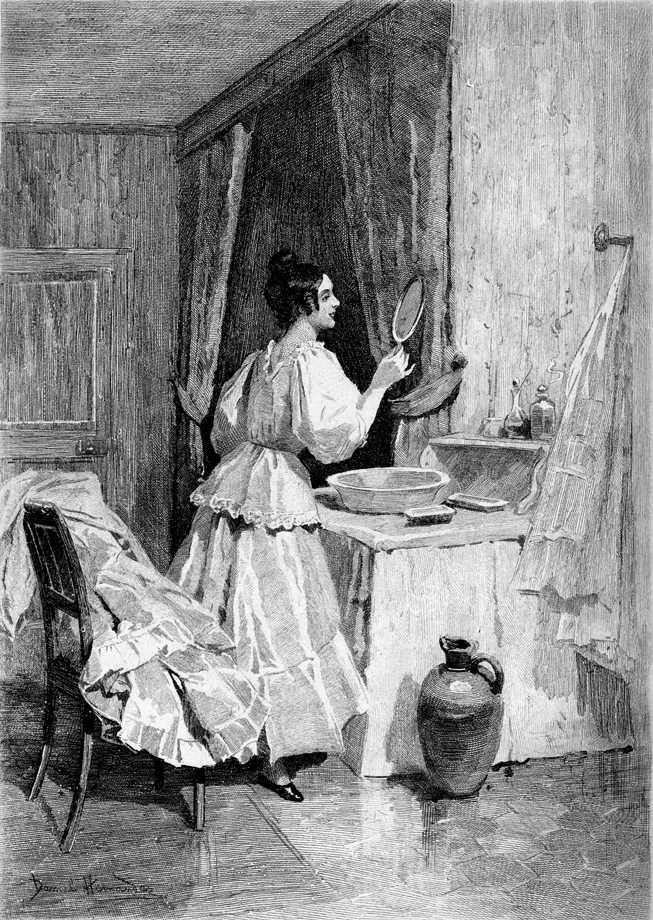
- Illustration from an 1897 edition by Daniel Hernández
- Author: Honoré de Balzac
- Language: French
- Series: La Comédie humaine
- Publisher: Madame Béchet – Charpentier – Furne
- Publication date: 1833-1834 (serial) 1834 (book)
- Publication place: France
- Preceded by: Ursule Mirouët
- Followed by: Pierrette

Eugénie Grandet (French pronunciation: [øʒeni ɡʁɑ̃dɛ]) is a novel first serialised from 1833 to 1834, and published in book form in 1834 by French author Honoré de Balzac. While he was writing it he conceived his ambitious project La Comédie humaine and almost immediately prepared a second edition, revising the names of some of the characters so that Eugénie Grandet then fitted into the section: Scenes from provincial life (Scènes de la vie de province) in the Comédie. He dedicated the edition to Maria Du Fresnay, who was then his lover and was the mother of his daughter, Marie-Caroline Du Fresnay. (Note: see page on Maria Du Fresnay and reference in the Balzac article)

== Background ==
Eugénie Grandet is set in the town of Saumur, which would have been familiar to Balzac since he grew up in Tours (about 35 miles away). The two towns are both on the Loire, with châteaux, and of similar size. Tours was much more important historically and politically, which may explain why Balzac allows the impression in the opening that the Grandet residence was Saumur's most important building. Though Balzac grew up in the aftermath of the Revolution, he came to adulthood in Paris under the restored Bourbon monarchy (Louis XVIII and Charles X) and wrote most of his oeuvre under the July Monarchy (1830–1848) of Louis Philippe I, which came to power when the revolution of 1830 deposed the Bourbon monarchy. Note, given the importance of money in the novel, that though the Republic had replaced the Livre with the Franc (of equivalent value), both currencies continued to circulate, as did the Louis (20 livres).

Balzac had been in a serious amount of debt in the 1820s and received a large loan from his tailor, Jean Buisson. In exchange for the loan, Balzac introduced Buisson to his readers and emphasized the quality of his work in this novel, as well as in Le Cabinet des Antiques and Étude de femme. This is arguably an early form of product placement.

== Plot summary ==
Felix Grandet, master cooper, married the daughter of a wealthy timber merchant at a time when the French Republic had confiscated the lands of the Church in the district of Saumur. When the land was auctioned his wife's dowry and his existing savings enabled him to buy substantial property, including some of the best area under vines, all at a very satisfactory price. Though there was little sympathy locally for the Revolution, Grandet rose in esteem and became mayor, later yielding the post under the Empire only because Napoleon had no liking for republicans. At this time his only daughter was ten years old and in that same year more wealth fell into Grandet's lap by way of inheritance of the estates of his mother-in-law, grandfather-in-law, and grandmother.

We gradually learn of Grandet's miserly habits which included rarely admitting townspeople to his house. The principal exceptions were his banker des Grassins and his notary Cruchot, both of whom understood better than many the extent of Grandet's wealth and that since he was 60 in 1819 when much of the action is set, that the wealth must one day devolve on Eugénie. Naturally, they had candidates to marry her in the form of Cruchot's nephew President Cruchot de Bonfons who was president of the court of first instance, and the des Grassins son, Adolphe des Grassins. The townspeople take a lively interest in the competition, which is only natural since some sort of inheritance was the major route to prosperity in the early nineteenth century.

Throughout this sequence we are treated to details of Felix Grandet's parsimony; this may have developed initially through sheer lack of funds but by now is total vice. He counts out slices of bread in the morning though actually never parting with cash for it since one of his tenants pays part of his rent in kind; most other consumables are supplied in a similar way. Mme Grandet is given no more than six francs at a time for pocket money. (Note: average annual income at the time was about 450 francs: see Picketty p106) Though his house is impressive externally it is old and run-down, and he is too miserly to repair it; their servant Nanon puts her foot through a rotten stair but faithfully saves the bottle she carries. The novel illustrates Balzac's belief that money had taken over as the national god. (Note: see Cousin Pons for more on this theme towards the end of Balzac's career)

On Eugénie's birthday, in 1819, Felix Grandet is celebrating with his favoured coterie of Grassinistes and Cruchotins. They are disturbed by a confident knock on the door and a young stranger is admitted, who hands a letter to Felix. It is from brother Guillaume, unseen and unresponsive in Paris for 30 years asking Felix to assist Charles his son to travel to the Indies. Additionally and confidentially, that Guillaume having gone bankrupt, is planning to take his own life. The next day newspaper headline announces the fact of Guillaume's death, and debts, which causes Charles to break down. While he sleeps Eugénie reads a letter to his mistress and assumes he is dismissing Annette and planning to marry her: Another letter Eugénie reads impels her to collect up the rare gold coins her father gave her on her birthdays. Later she offers the gold to Charles who asks her to guard a gold dressing case given to him by his mother. Meanwhile Felix had made 14,000 francs on dealing in gold coin and preparations were made for Charles to depart to the Indies. Felix devises a way of profiting from winding up his deceased brother's failed business, aided by des Grassins.

After Charles has left (not realising that Felix has swindled him out of his jewelry for a pitiful sum), Eugénie pines secretly for Charles, and is comforted by her mother and Nanon. On New Year's Day, Felix asks to see Eugénie's store of rare gold coins, an annual tradition. Enraged upon discovering that Eugénie has given them away to Charles, he shuts Eugénie in her bedroom, and gives orders that she is to eat only bread and water, and leave her room only to attend church. Appalled by this, Felix's wife, who has been patient, loving and supportive throughout their married life, is physically ground down by their austere life and Felix's behaviour towards Eugénie. As she lies ill in bed, she repeatedly begs Felix to forgive Eugénie, but he refuses.

Felix only changes his behaviour upon being visited by the notary, M. Cruchot, who warns Felix that if his wife dies, Eugénie will be her heir rather than Felix. As such, she would be entitled to demand half of all the property that Felix and his wife jointly own. Felix accordingly becomes more friendly and forgives Eugénie, but his wife continues to get sicker. A doctor tells him that drugs will be of little use: at best, with care, Felix's wife will live until the autumn. When she dies, Felix persuades Eugénie to sign away all of her entitlement to her mother's share of the joint property: he promises her a pittance of 100 francs a month. Eugénie agrees to this, although Felix subsequently goes back on his promise.

Years pass, and Eugénie continues her same existence, assuming many of her mother's duties in the household. Eventually, Felix himself sickens and dies, leaving Eugénie extremely wealthy. Eugénie lives the next few years in Saumur with her faithful servant Nanon and Nanon's husband, M. Cornoiller, and remains unmarried, waiting for Charles.

Meanwhile, Charles has made a fortune (several million francs) trading slaves in the Americas. He, like Felix, has the Grandets' fatal flaws: greed and avarice. His business activities include the illegal and the unethical, and he has continuously been unfaithful to Eugénie, whom he soon forgets, blinded by both greed, and by rage at the memory and realisation of Felix having swindled him. Deciding to return to Paris, he decides to marry into a noble but impoverished family, the d'Aubrions, to advance his social standing. In Paris, M. des Grassins – representing his father's creditors – approaches Charles, asking for the balance of the debts. Charles however taunts him, saying the debts are his father's rather than his own, and has him thrown out of the room

Charles then writes to Eugénie of his new engagement, telling her that he does not love his new fiancée, but that love is merely an idealistic dream, and that Eugénie's simple country lifestyle is completely incompatible with his own. He also demands the return of his dressing case, and encloses a check for the balance of the gold coins. Eugénie is shocked by this news and cries. She is also visited by Mme des Grassins, who has a letter from her husband, in which, outraged at Charles's behavior towards him, he declares his intention to stop protecting Charles from the creditors, and have him officially declared bankrupt, ruining Charles's newfound social standing.

Later that day, her priest comes visiting to advise her to fulfill her Catholic duty to marry and produce heirs to her fortune. She decides to marry Cruchot, under the conditions that he must never attempt to consummate their marriage. Cruchot readily agrees, motivated by Eugénie's wealth, and ensures they both sign a will under which the deceased spouse leaves their entire fortune to the survivor.

Cruchot is sent by Eugénie to Paris to pay off Charles's creditors in full, ensuring no bankruptcy is called. She also sends Charles a letter agreeing with him that she is indeed very different to him, and their lifestyles are indeed completely incompatible. Charles realises that Eugénie is actually extremely wealthy (having been fooled by Felix's miserly behaviour): Cruchot taunts him with the fact that Eugenie is actually far wealthier than Charles.

Cruchot goes on to become president of the superior courts, but dies before achieving his final ambitions of attaining a peerage, and before Eugénie's death, which both he and Eugénie knew he had long hoped for, in order to inherit her wealth. After his death, Eugénie – inheriting Cruchot's wealth – remains in the old Grandet household, living as parsimoniously as they had always lived, donating her accumulated wealth to charitable causes.

The novel ends as it begins, with the latest round of suitors paying visits to the Grandet household, in the hope of marrying the wealthy Eugénie.

== Reception ==
Eugenie Grandet was critically well received when published. So much so that Balzac complained, "Those who call me the father of Eugenie Grandet wish to belittle me. It is a masterpiece, I know; but it is a little masterpiece; they are very careful not to mention the great ones."

== Themes ==
Christopher Prendergast writes "Eugenie's story is primarily of interest as the tale of a rite de passage from innocence to experience, ignorance to knowledge, illusion to disenchantment."

Balzac portrays Eugenie's father Felix as a miser, and his portrayal is influenced by the character Harpagon from Molière's play, The Miser. He wrote, “Molière had created Avarice with Harpagon; with Old Grandet, I have created a miser.” Felix Grandet was also part of the new capitalist class that had emerged since the French Revolution. The start of his fortunes occur during the Revolution when he takes advantage of the opportunities at that time, pretending to be a committed Republican. He continues to prosper in the years since the Revolution in spite of all the political changes.

Balzac had initially classified this novel as one of the Scènes de la vie privée in La Comédie humaine but then later moved it to the Scènes de la vie de province. So the novel is a study of life in provincial France, and the interconnection between the private lives of the Grandet family and the public life of Saumur.

== Notable translations ==
Fyodor Mikhaylovich Dostoyevsky began his career by translating the novel into Russian, in 1843.

Ellen Marriage translated most of Dent's first complete English edition of the Comedie in the 1890s.

Clara Bell and Katherine Prescott Wormeley both translated the novel into English. Rose Tremain wrote an introduction to Wormeley's translation for a Vintage Classics edition.

== Adaptations ==
=== Film ===
The Conquering Power

- The Conquering Power (1921) by Rex Ingram, starring Alice Terry (Eugénie), Rudolph Valentino (Charles), Ralph Lewis (Father), Carrie Daumery (Mother), Bridgetta Clark (Mrs. des Grassins)
- Eugenia Grandet (1946) by Mario Soldati, starring Alida Valli
- Eugenia Grandet (1953) by Emilio Gómez Muriel, starring Marga López, Julio Villareal and Andrea Palma.
- Eugenia Grande (1960) by Alekseev Sergey Petrovich / Sergey Alekseev, starring Ariadna Shengelaya, Mikhail Kozakov

=== Television ===
- Eugenie Grandet (1965) directed by Rex Tucker, starring Valerie Gearon (Eugénie), Mary Kerridge (Madame des Grassins), Beatrix Lehmann (Madame Grandet), Jonathan Cecil (Adolphe)
- Cross of Gold (1965)
- Eugenia Grandet (1977) by Pilar Miró, starring Carmen Maura, Eusebio Poncela.
- Eugénie Grandet (1993) by Jean-Daniel Verhaeghe, starring Alexandra London (Eugénie), Jean Carmet (Father Grandet), Dominique Labourier (Mother Grandet), Claude Jade (Lucienne des Grassins).

=== Radio ===
- Eugenie Grandet (2014) by Rose Tremain (adaptor), for BBC Radio 4
