= Missing Daughters =

Missing Daughters may refer to:

- Missing Daughters (1939 film), an American crime film
- Missing Daughters (1924 film), an American silent crime drama film
