= Betsy Ann Hisle =

American child actress (1917–1978)

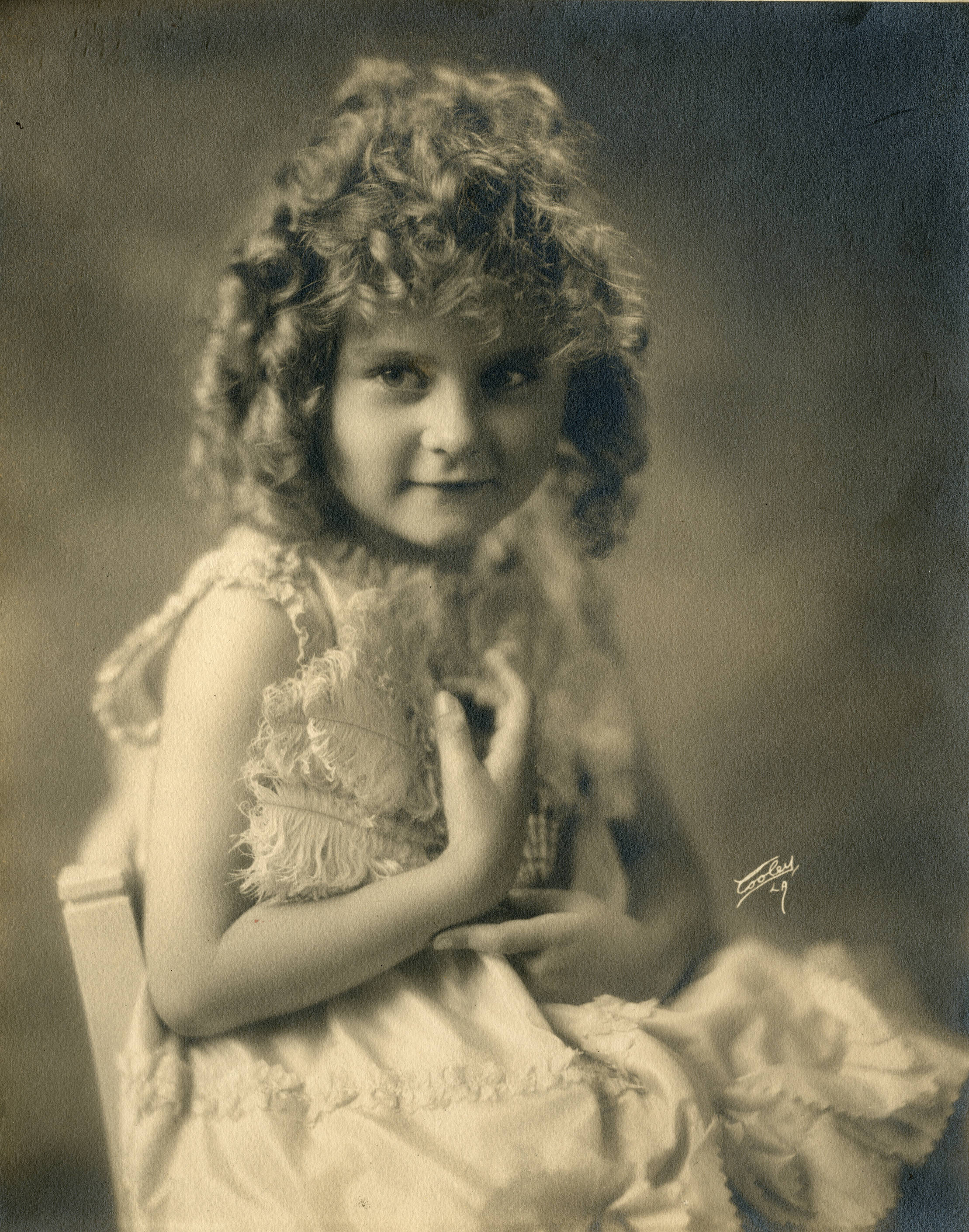
- Hisle in 1923
- Born: Juanita J. Hisle; May 30, 1917; Seattle, Washington, U.S.
- Died: September 20, 1978 (aged 61); Los Angeles, California, U.S.
- Occupation: Actress
- Years active: 1921–1933

Betsy Ann Hisle (born Juanita J. Hisle; May 30, 1917 – September 20, 1978) was an American child actress. She is best known for appearing in Nellie, the Beautiful Cloak Model (1924), The Way of All Flesh (1927) and Sorrell and Son (1927).

== Early life and career ==
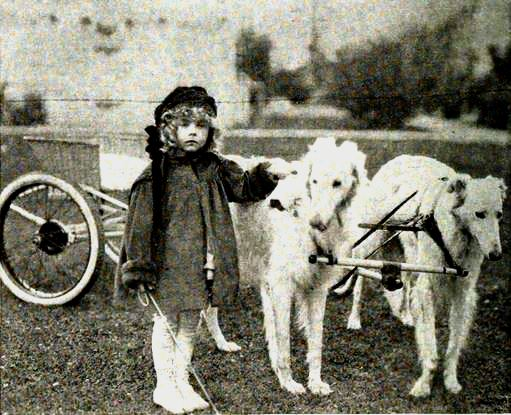
Hisle and a team of Russian wolfhounds (Borzoi), on page 96 of the October 1922 Photoplay.

Betsy Ann Hisle was born in Seattle, Washington, the daughter of Walter W. Hisle and Luella Mammer Hisle, who had moved west from Lamoni, Iowa. Displaying performing talent from early childhood, she began dance lessons in Seattle after recovering from illness as a toddler and was soon appearing in children’s benefit programs. By age three she was noted for her ability to sing, swim, and dance with unusual poise, traits that led to early attention from motion-picture representatives.

The Hisle family relocated to Los Angeles in the early 1920s, where Betsy Ann was signed to the Goldwyn Studios as a juvenile player. Publicists frequently described her as “golden-haired” and “natural-born,” emphasizing her aversion to stage cosmetics and her preference for authentic childlike performances. She soon became known as a photogenic “Cupid” figure, appearing in short subjects and publicity stills wearing small wings—an image that circulated widely in movie-fan columns of the period.

By 1924 she had established herself as one of Hollywood’s most prominent child performers, reportedly sharing the screen with Jackie Coogan in A Boy of Flanders and appearing in features such as Nellie the Beautiful Cloak Model and The Poverty of Riches. Her training included dance and music as well as studio tutoring, allowing her to alternate between film work and live stage engagements, including a production of The Sign of the Rose at age seven.

At seven years old Hisle joined Paramount Pictures, where she was cast by Herbert Brenon in the adventure epic Beau Geste. During production she was known to keep a pet cat named Ginger, who was briefly slated to appear alongside her before disappearing from the set—a light-hearted anecdote that highlighted her early Hollywood experience. The following year she was chosen by Universal Pictures to portray Little Eva in the studio’s adaptation of Uncle Tom’s Cabin. Studio reports noted that at nine she was the youngest actor ever given the part, and that she had previously performed charitable stage work in Seattle with Charles Gilpin, later cast as Uncle Tom.

Hisle continued to secure juvenile roles through the late silent era, appearing in The Dark Angel (1925) as the child version of Vilma Bánky, and later as Emil Jannings’s daughter in The Way of All Flesh (1927). By mid-decade her name and image were also used in promotional tie-ins, including the “Little Miss Kelly-Springfield Girl” advertising campaign and a branded Betsy Ann Ice Cream enterprise that opened in Pasadena in 1926.

Outside film work, Hisle remained active in community performance. During the late 1920s she participated in children’s orchestras and local music clubs in Pasadena and Altadena, performing ukulele and harmonica and appearing with the Pasadena Post American Legion Troubadours at civic events.

== Later life ==
By 1930 Hisle had become a familiar figure in Northern California charity and publicity circuits. She served for consecutive years as mistress of ceremonies and honorary hostess at the Oakland Police and Fire Departments’ Friendship Party, a large annual celebration for underprivileged children held at Neptune Beach in Alameda. She was twice flown from Los Angeles to Oakland by airplane to preside over the event, where she received joint honorary badges from both departments in gratitude for her volunteer work.

== Filmography ==
Year	Title	Role	Notes
1921	The Poverty of Riches	Little Girl	(uncredited)
1922	Fire Fighters	Mabel 'Mike'	(as Hal Roach's Rascals)
1922	The Kentucky Derby	Little Girl	(uncredited)
1922	A Blind Bargain	Little Girl	(uncredited)
1923	Look Your Best	Little Girl	(uncredited)
1923	The Sheik of Hollywood	Little Girl	(short, uncredited)
1924	Pied Piper Malone	Child	(uncredited)
1924	Poisoned Paradise: The Forbidden Story of Monte Carlo	Little Girl Feeding Pigeons	(uncredited)
1924	The Fighting Coward	Little Girl	(uncredited)
1924	A Boy of Flanders	Little Girl	(uncredited)
1924	Nellie, the Beautiful Cloak Model	Nellie at age 5	(uncredited)
1924	Sherlock Jr.	Little Girl	(uncredited)
1924	The Hollywood Kid	Pico's Older Daughter	
1924	Girl Shy	Little Girl	(uncredited)
1924	Going East	Little Girl	(uncredited)
1924	Dark Stairways	Little Girl	(uncredited)
1924	Her Marriage Vow	The Hilton Daughter	(as Dorothy Vaughn)
1924	Dynamite Dan	Little Girl	(uncredited)
1924	Husbands and Lovers	Little Girl	(uncredited)
1924	All Night Long	One of Harry's Children	short
1924	Gold Heels	Little Jane	
1925	The Golden Bed	Child	(uncredited)
1925	A Thief in Paradise	Little Girl	(uncredited)
1925	Scarlet and Gold	The Little Girl	
1925	The Dressmaker from Paris	Little Girl	(uncredited)
1925	Sally	Little Girl	(uncredited)
1925	Remember When?	Harry as a Child	short
1925	Zander the Great	Little Girl	(uncredited)
1925	Rose of the Desert	Girl	
1925	The Dark Angel	Flower Girl	
1926	The Greater Glory	Lily	
1926	Buster's Mix-Up	Kid at Party	short
1926	The Scarlet Letter	Child	(uncredited)
1926	Beau Geste	Isabel Rivers - Younger	(uncredited)
1927	The Way of All Flesh	Charlotte	
1927	Sorrell and Son	Molly as a Child	
1928	Laugh, Clown, Laugh	Little Girl at Tito's Death	(uncredited)
1930	The Sins of the Children	Katherine Wagenkampf as a Child	(uncredited)
1933	Jennie Gerhardt	Veronica Gerhardt	(uncredited)
