= Zhang Guanyao =

Chinese translator and professor

- 张冠尧
- Born: 1933; China
- Died: 2002 (aged 68–69); China
- Education: Peking University
- Occupation: Translator
- Writing career
- Language: Chinese, French
- Genre: Novel
- Notable works: The Red and the Black; Père Goriot; Eugénie Grandet

Zhang Guanyao (simplified Chinese: 张冠尧; traditional Chinese: 張冠堯; pinyin: Zhāng Guànyáo; 1933 – 2002) was a Chinese translator and professor at Peking University. He was most notable for being one of the main translators into Chinese of the works of the French novelists Stendhal and Honoré de Balzac.

== Biography ==
Zhang was born in 1933. In 1952 he was accepted to Peking University, where he graduated in 1956. After university, he taught there.

== Translations ==
- The Red and the Black (红与黑)
- Biographies of Celebrities (名人传)
- Père Goriot and Eugénie Grandet (高老头和欧也妮葛朗台)
- Bel-Ami (漂亮朋友)
