= The Adventures of Shorty =

1914 film

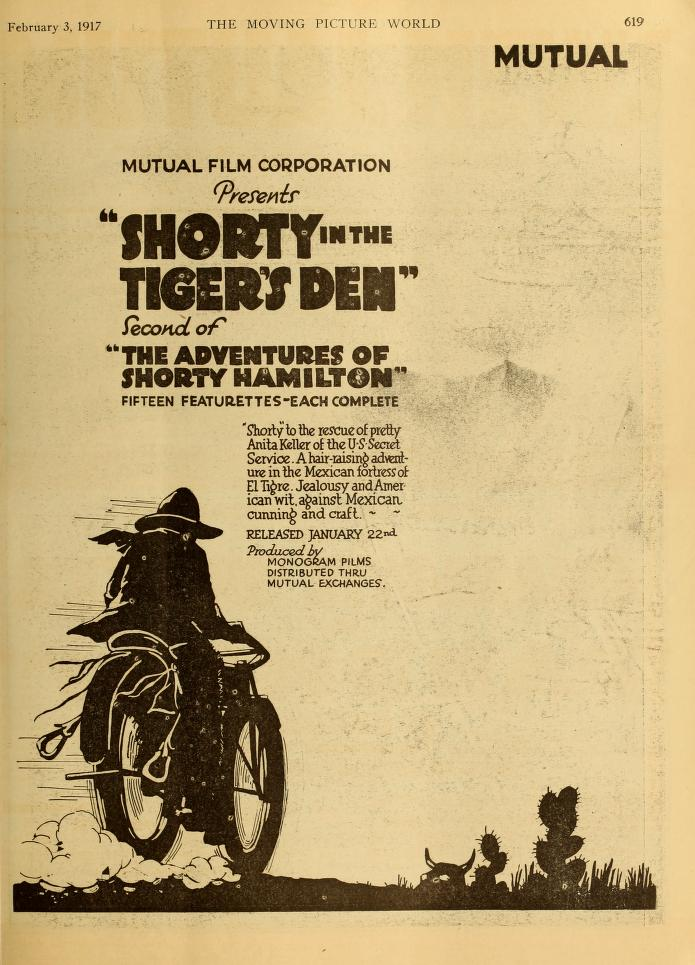
- Shorty in the Tiger's Den (1917)
- Directed by: Francis Ford; Scott Sidney
- Produced by: Broncho Film Company
- Starring: Shorty Hamilton
- Distributed by: Mutual Film
- Release date: March 18, 1914
- Running time: 2 reels
- Country: United States
- Languages: Silent; English intertitles

The Adventures of Shorty is the name of a 1914 American short silent Western film featuring Shorty Hamilton, and the general name for the series of similar short films it started.

More than 30 two-reel "Shorty" titles were released between 1914 and 1917. All featured Hamilton as the "Shorty" character, a cowboy with a trained horse—his "remarkably intelligent horse, Beauty."

The films were initially produced by Thomas H. Ince, many were written by the veteran screenwriter C. Gardner Sullivan. The 1915 "Shorty's Ranch" was the last entry from the original producers, and after a year the series was revived by Monogram Pictures in January 1917. Directors in the series included Francis Ford and Jay Hunt. Aside from the trained horse, Hamilton's co-stars in the "Shorty" pictures included Enid Markey, Betty Burbridge, and Charles Ray.

The films placed "Shorty" into a series of improbable comic adventures: inheriting a harem, posing as a judge, joining the Secret Service, going to college, and confronting a wide range of characters including loan sharks, ghosts, and moonshiners.

In March 1917, a newspaper reviewer of the latest "Shorty" film wrote the following about Hamilton:

Shorty Hamilton is a fascinating little chap who makes you want to clasp him by the hand and call him friend. He is a gifted actor who can make you laugh or lift you to the extreme pinnacle of nervous anticipation in the same breath. He never over-does anything and his extreme naturalness is refreshing. 'Shorty in the Tiger's Den,' is with us today and you will shake with laughter as Shorty tries to ride a motorcycle, which proves more uncontrollable to Shorty than a bucking pony.

== Episode list ==
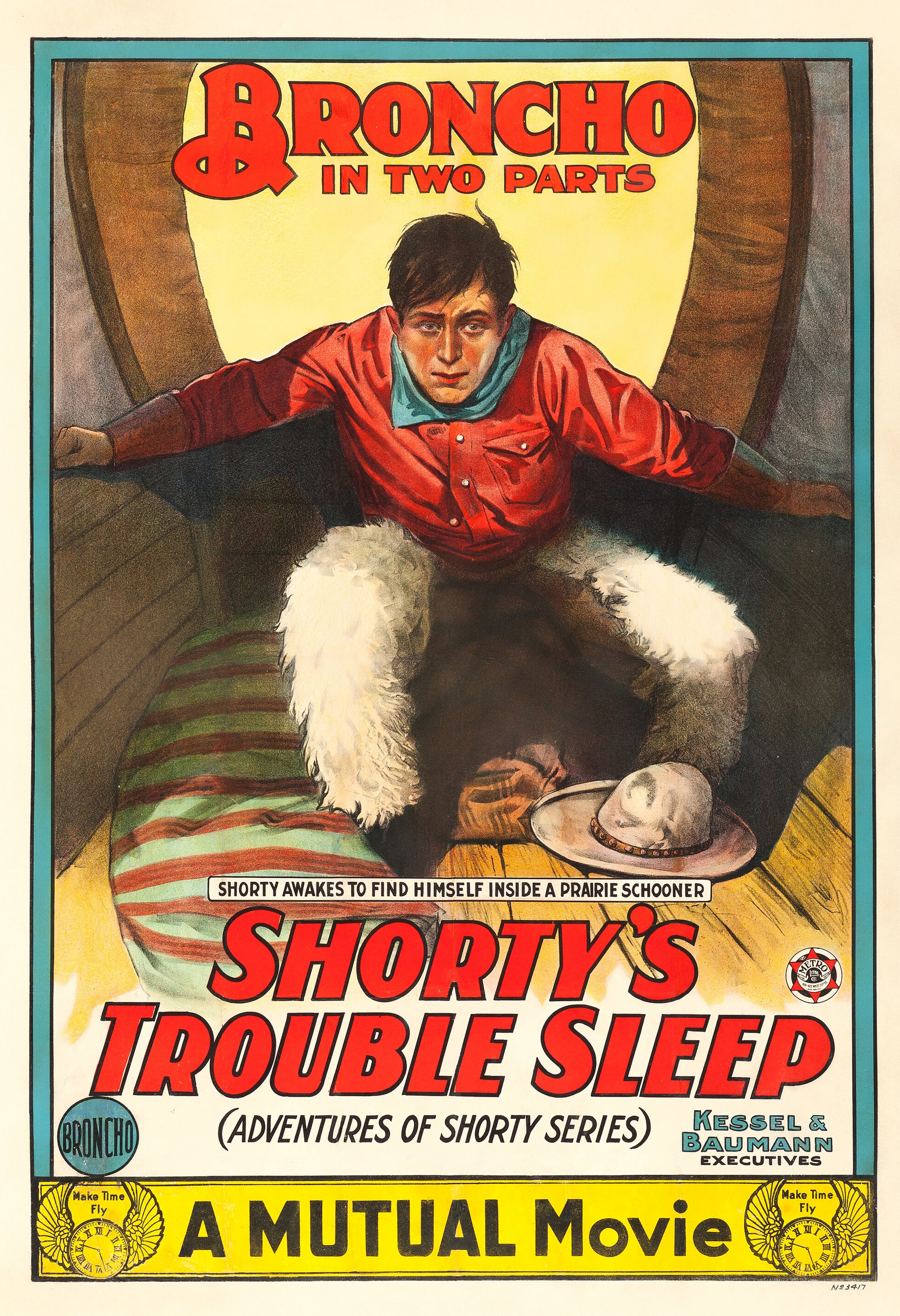
Poster for Shorty's Troubled Sleep (1915)

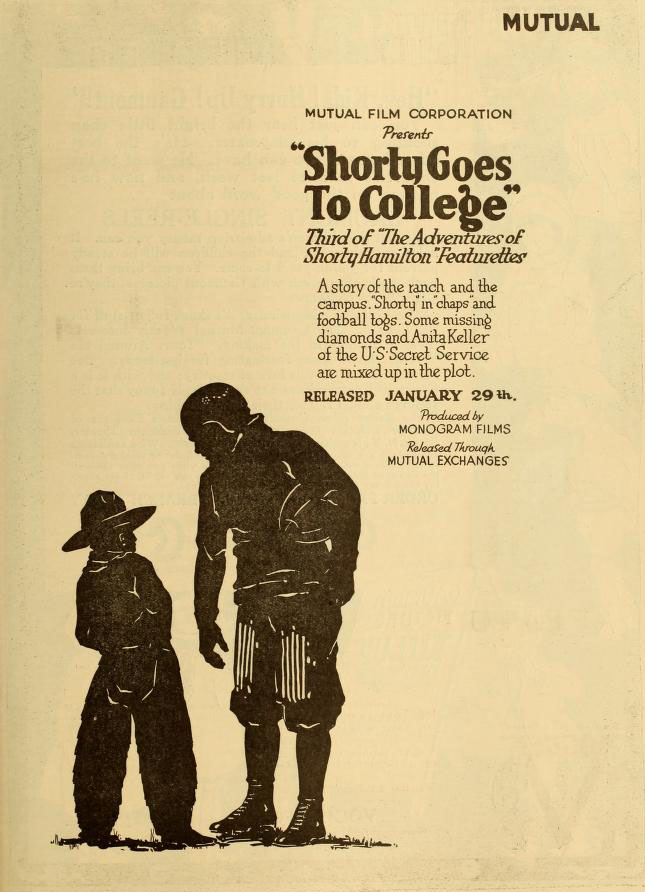
Shorty Goes to College (1917)

- The Adventures of Shorty (1914)
- Shorty's Sacrifice (1914)
- Shorty Escapes Marriage (1914)
- Shorty's Strategy (1914)
- Shorty's Trip to Mexico (1914)
- Shorty Gets Into Trouble (1914)
- Shorty Turns Judge (1914)
- Shorty and the Aridville Terror (1914)
- Shorty and the Fortune Teller (1914)
- Shorty and Sherlock Holmes (1914)
- Shorty Falls Into a Title (1914)
- Shorty's Adventures in the City (1915)
- Shorty's Secret (1915)
- Shorty Among the Cannibals (1915)
- Shorty's Troubled Sleep (1915)
- Shorty Turns Actor (1915)
- Shorty Inherits a Harem (1915)
- Shorty's Ranch (1915)
- Shorty and the Yellow Ring (1917)
- Shorty in the Tiger's Den (1917)
- Shorty Goes to College (1917)
- Shorty Joins the Secret Service (1917)
- Shorty Turns Wild Man (1917)
- Shorty Promotes His Love Affair (1917)
- Shorty Hooks a Loan Shark (1917)
- Shorty Traps a Lottery King (1917)
- Shorty Bags the Bullion Thieves (1917)
- Shorty Trails the Moonshiners (1917)
- Shorty Lands a Master Crook (1917)
- Shorty Solves a Wireless Mystery (1917)
- Shorty Reduces the High Cost of Living (1917)
- Shorty Lays a Jungle Ghost (1917)
- Shorty Unearths a Tartar (1917)
