= Rose of the Desert =

1925 film

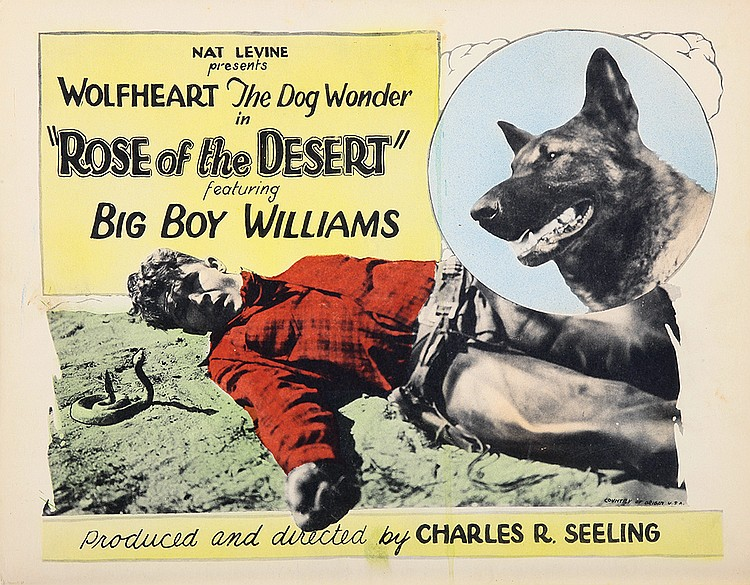
- Directed by: Charles R. Seeling
- Produced by: Nat Levine; Charles R. Seeling
- Starring: Guinn 'Big Boy' Williams; Peggy O'Day
- Production company: Charles R. Seeling Productions
- Distributed by: Aywon Film Corporation
- Release date: August 18, 1925
- Running time: 50 minutes
- Country: United States
- Languages: Silent; English intertitles

Rose of the Desert is a 1925 American silent Western film directed by Charles R. Seeling. It was one of series of films made as a vehicle for the animal star Wolfheart the Dog. The cast also included Guinn 'Big Boy' Williams and Peggy O'Day.

== Cast ==
- Peggy O'Day
- Guinn 'Big Boy' Williams
- Betsy Ann Hisle
- Wolfheart the Dog

== Bibliography ==
- Langman, Larry. A Guide to Silent Westerns. Greenwood Publishing Group, 1992.
