= The Three Buckaroos =

1922 film

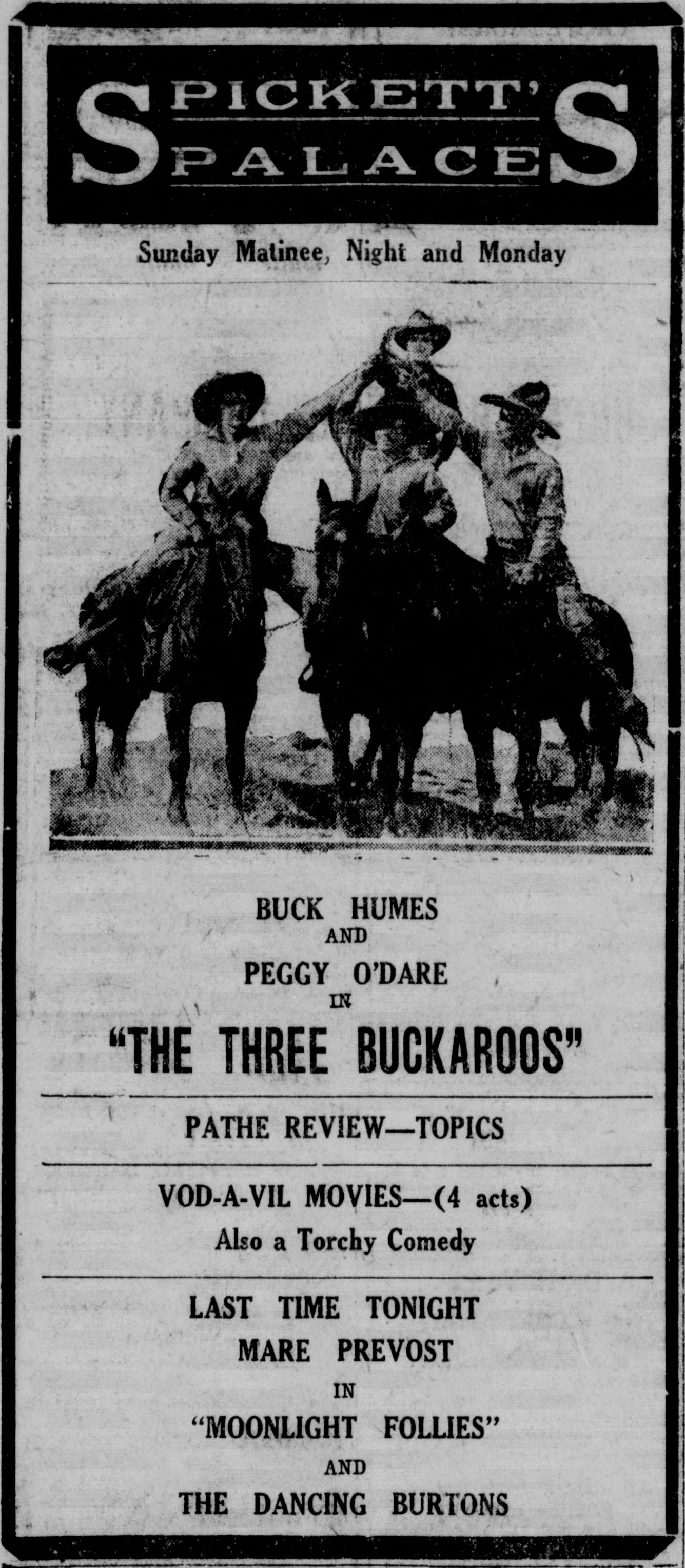
- Contemporary advertisement
- Directed by: Fred J. Balshofer
- Written by: Fred J. Balshofer
- Produced by: Fred J. Balshofer
- Starring: Fred Humes; Peggy O'Day; Monte Montague
- Production company: Fred Balshofer Productions
- Distributed by: American Releasing Corporation
- Release date: April 16, 1922
- Running time: 50 minutes
- Country: United States
- Languages: Silent; English intertitles

The Three Buckaroos is a lost 1922 American silent Western film directed by Fred J. Balshofer, starring Fred Humes, Peggy O'Day and Monte Montague.

== Cast ==
- Fred Humes as Dartigan
- Peggy O'Day as Constance Kingsley
- Monte Montague as Athor
- Tex Keith as Forthor
- Bill Conant as Aramor
- Al Ernest Garcia as 'Card' Ritchie
- Cleo Childers as Flores

== Preservation ==
With no holdings located in archives, The Three Buckaroos is considered a lost film.

== Bibliography ==
- Connelly, Robert B. The Silents: Silent Feature Films, 1910-36, Volume 40, Issue 2. December Press, 1998.
- Munden, Kenneth White. The American Film Institute Catalog of Motion Pictures Produced in the United States, Part 1. University of California Press, 1997.
