= Beatrice Dominguez =

American actress (1896–1921)

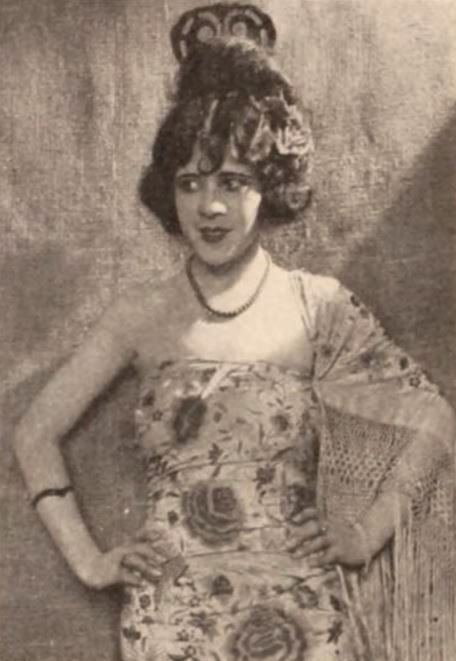
- Dominguez in The Four Horsemen of the Apocalypse (1921)
- Born: Beatriz Dominguez; 6 September 1896; Chihuahua, Mexico
- Died: 27 February 1921 (aged 24); Los Angeles, California, US
- Occupations: Dancer, actress

Beatrice Dominguez (born Beatriz Dominguez, and often billed as "La Bella Sevilla"; 6 September 1896 – 27 February 1921) was an American actress and dancer who was active in Hollywood during the silent era.

== Biography ==
Beatrice was born in either San Bernardino, California, or Chihuahua, Mexico, to José Dominguez and Petra Valencia. In any case, Beatrice spent most of her childhood in Southern California, and as a teenager, she became an entertainer in Los Angeles. Acclaimed for her work as a dancer, she soon garnered roles in a wide range of Hollywood films, including a memorable tango performance with Rudolph Valentino in The Four Horsemen of the Apocalypse (1921).

While filming the film The White Horseman in 1921, she suffered a ruptured appendix and was rushed to Clara Barton Hospital. Two operations could not save her, and she died at age 24. Her role in The White Horseman was completed with the assistance of a stand-in who was about Beatrice's height.

== Selected filmography ==
- The White Horseman (1921)
- The Four Horsemen of the Apocalypse (1921)
- The Fire Cat (1921)
- Under Crimson Skies (1920)
- The Moon Riders (1920)
- Hair Trigger Stuff (1920)
- The Wild Westerner (1919)
- The Sundown Trail (1919)
- The Light of Victory (1919)
- The Sea Gull (1914)
- The Masked Dancer (1914)
