= The Greater Glory =

1926 film

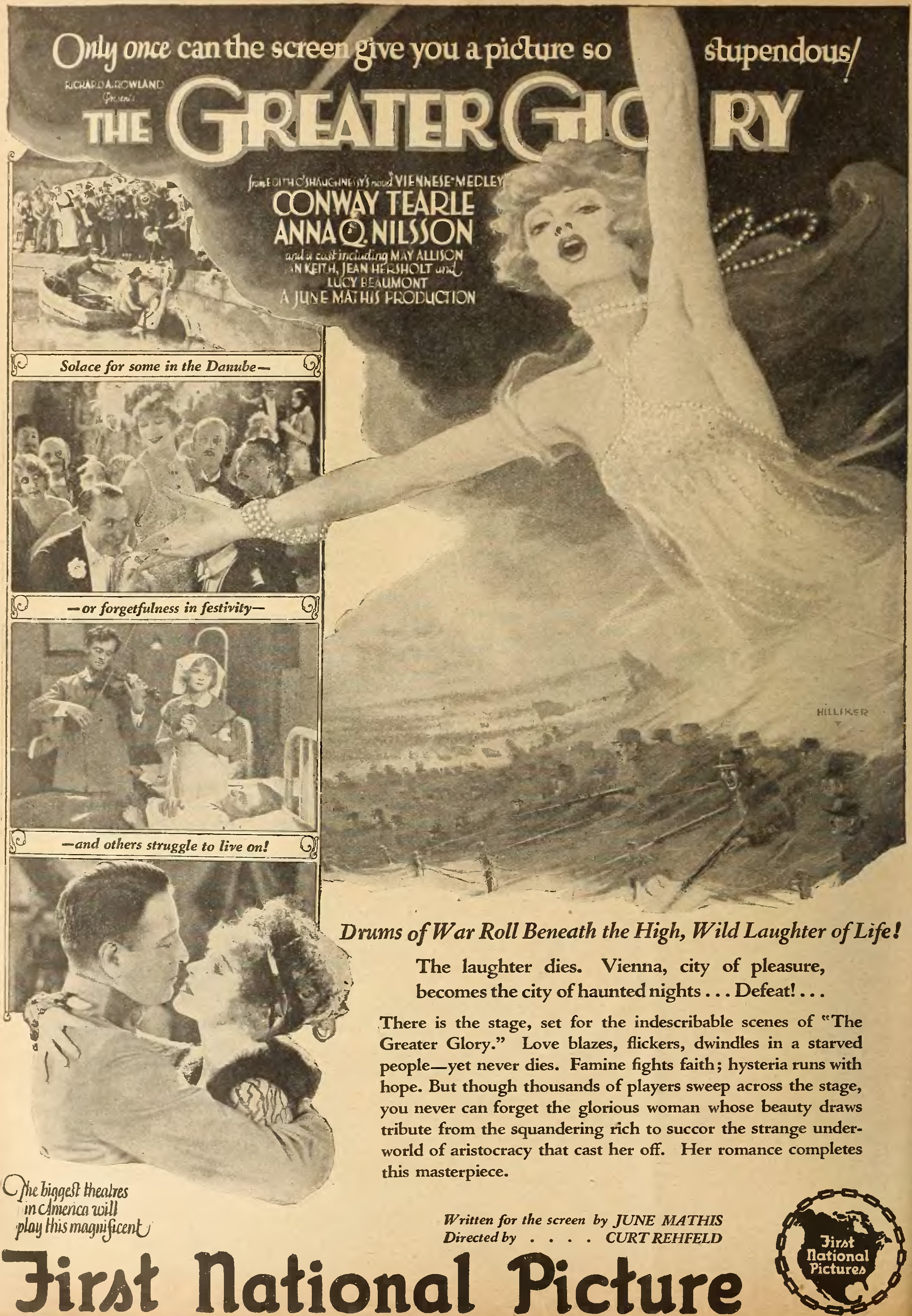
- Advertisement
- Directed by: Curt Rehfeld
- Written by: June Mathis (scenario)
- Based on: The Viennese Medley by Edith O'Shaughnessy
- Produced by: First National Pictures
- Starring: Conway Tearle; Anna Q. Nilsson
- Cinematography: John W. Boyle; Arthur Martinelli
- Edited by: George McGuire
- Distributed by: Associated First National
- Release date: May 2, 1926
- Running time: 110 minutes
- Country: United States
- Language: Silent (English intertitles)

Swedish film poster

The Greater Glory is a 1926 American silent drama film directed by Curt Rehfeld. The film starred Conway Tearle and Boris Karloff. The Greater Glory is sometimes listed as The Viennese Medley, the title of Edith O'Shaughnessy's novel of which the film is based.

== Plot ==
As described in a film magazine, Fanny von Berg's engagement to Count Maxim von Hurtig is suddenly broken off and she is denounced by her family for a suspected indiscretion. When they are reduced to starvation by the war, the family members accept her earnings without acknowledging the source. As the hostess of a Viennese night club, Fanny becomes the mistress of a rich war profiteer. The Count, loving her still, prevents her from making further sacrifices for her or his people, and they find ultimate happiness in the prospect of a new life together.

== Cast ==
- Conway Tearle as Count Maxim von Hurtig
- Anna Q. Nilsson as Fanny
- May Allison as Corinne
- Ian Keith as Pauli Birbach
- Lucy Beaumont as Tante Ilde
- Jean Hersholt as Gustav Schmidt
- Nigel De Brulier as Dr. Hermann von Berg
- Bridgetta Clark as Mitzi, his wife
- John St. Polis as Professor Leopold Eberhardt (credited as John Sainpolis)
- Marcia Manon as Kaethe, his wife
- Edward Earle as Otto Steiner
- Virginia Southern as Liesel, his wife
- Isabelle Keith as Anna, Pauli's wife
- Kathleen Chambers as Irma von Berg, the stepmother
- Hale Hamilton as Leon Krum
- Cora Macey as Marie
- Carrie Daumery as Countess von Hurtig
- Thur Fairfax as Theodore von Hurtig
- Boris Karloff as Scissors Grinder
- George A. Billings as Cross Bearer (as George Billings)
- Bess Flowers as Helga
- Marcelle Corday as Maid
- Virginia Davis as Resi
- Florence Lawrence
- Mary Jane Milliken as Elsie Eberhardt - Little girl
- Billy Seay as Gusel Von Berg
- Louise Emmons (uncredited)

== Preservation ==
With no complete prints of The Greater Glory located in any film archives, it is a lost film. A fragment survives at The George Eastman Museum.

== See also ==
- Boris Karloff filmography
