= Shorty Hamilton =

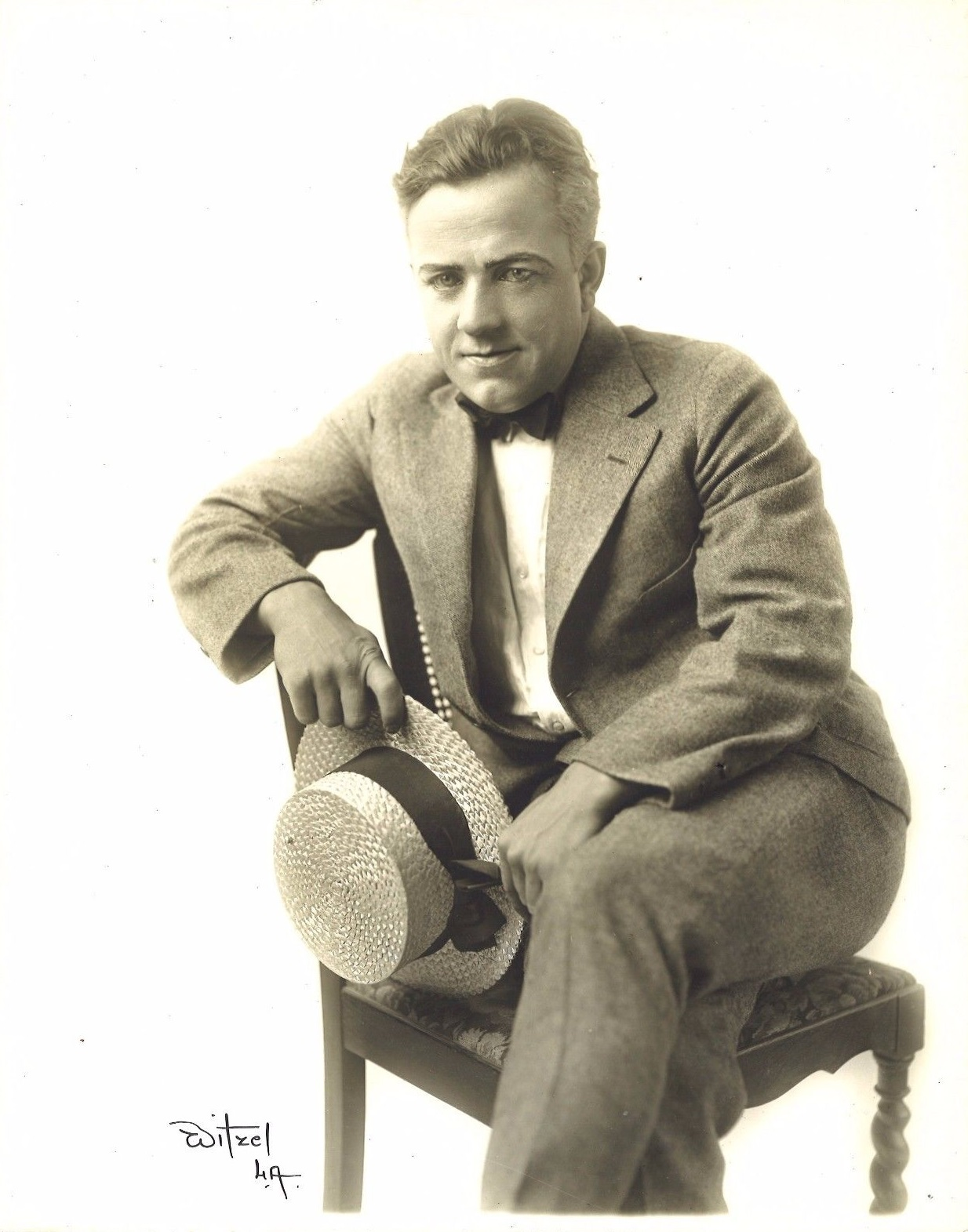
- Hamilton ca. 1917
- Born: William John Schroeder; September 9, 1879; Chicago, Illinois
- Died: March 7, 1925 (aged 45); Los Angeles, California
- Other names: William John Schroeder; John "Jack" H. Hamilton
- Occupation: Actor
- Years active: 1909 - 1925

Shorty Hamilton (September 9, 1879 – March 7, 1925) was an American actor and silent film comedian who appeared in more than 80 films, mostly westerns, from 1909 to 1925. His birth name was William John Schroeder, and he was also known as "Jack Hamilton." He had served in the United States Cavalry for several years and worked as a cowboy in Montana and Texas. He was best known for the "Adventures of Shorty" series of two-reel silent films that were released from 1912 to 1917.

== Early days ==
Before becoming an actor, Hamilton served six years in the United States Cavalry and worked as a cowboy for five years in Montana and Texas. As an actor, he appeared in many of the western films produced by Thomas H. Ince, including The Great Smash. He was described as "an extremely likeable little chap who combines the wonderful riding, lassoing, cow-punching stunts of the true westerner with the polished, quick-wittedness of the New York society man."

== "Adventures of Shorty" ==
Hamilton was best known for the "Adventures of Shorty" series of two-reel comedies in which he starred from 1914 to 1917. There were more than 35 two-reel films featuring Hamilton as the "Shorty" character, a cowboy with a trained horse—his "remarkably intelligent horse, Beauty." W. H. Clifford continued the series at his short-lived film company.

Hamilton was not the only big talent associated with the "Shorty" pictures; the films were produced by Thomas H. Ince, many were written by the noted screenwriter C. Gardner Sullivan, and the directors included Francis Ford. Aside from the trained horse, Hamilton's co-stars in the "Shorty" pictures included Enid Markey and Charles Ray.

== Personal life ==
Hamilton's popularity drew attention to his personal life as well as his screen performances. In the fall of 1914, less than six months after the release of Shorty Escapes Matrimony, Hamilton married Ethel Spurgin. Hamilton met Spurgin, who was a fan of Hamilton's work, at an appearance at a movie theater in Venice, Los Angeles, California. The two married less than two months after they met.

== Later years and death ==
The last of the "Adventures of Shorty" films was released in 1917. However, Hamilton continued to appear in western genre films.

In March 1925, Hamilton died at age 45 when his automobile crashed into a steam shovel standing in a street in Hollywood.

== Filmography ==
- The Mexican's Crime (1909)
- The Battle of Gettysburg (1913)
- The Adventures of Shorty (1914)
- Shorty's Sacrifice (1914)
- Shorty Escapes Marriage (1914)
- Shorty's Strategy (1914)
- Shorty's Trip to Mexico (1914)
- Shorty Gets Into Trouble (1914)
- Shorty Turns Judge (1914)
- Shorty and the Aridville Terror (1914)
- Shorty and the Fortune Teller (1914)
- Shorty and Sherlock Holmes (1914)
- Shorty Falls Into a Title (1914)
- Sergeant Jim's Horse (1915)
- The Bottomless Pit (1915)
- Shorty's Adventures in the City (1915)
- Shorty's Secret (1915)
- Shorty Among the Cannibals (1915)
- On the Night Stage (1915)
- Shorty's Troubled Sleep (1915)
- Shorty Turns Actor (1915)
- Shorty Inherits a Harem (1915)
- Shorty's Ranch (1915)
- Gypsy Joe (1916)
- Shorty and the Yellow Ring (1917)
- Shorty in the Tiger's Den (1917)
- Shorty Goes to College (1917)
- Shorty Joins the Secret Service (1917)
- Shorty Turns Wild Man (1917)
- Shorty Promotes His Love Affair (1917)
- Shorty Hooks a Loan Shark (1917)
- Shorty Traps a Lottery King (1917)
- Shorty Bags the Bullion Thieves (1917)
- Shorty Trails the Moonshiners (1917)
- Shorty Lands a Master Crook (1917)
- Shorty Solves a Wireless Mystery (1917)
- Shorty Reduces the High Cost of Living (1917)
- Shorty Lays a Jungle Ghost (1917)
- Shorty Unearths a Tartar (1917)
- My Own United States (1918)
- The Ranger (1918 film) (1918)
- The Pen Vulture (1918)
- A Nugget in the Rough (1918)
- Denny from Ireland (1918)
- When Arizona Won (1919)
- The Ranger (1921)
- So This Is Arizona (1922)
- Angel Citizens (1922)
- It Happened Out West (1923)
- Two Fisted Thompson (1925)
