= Poisoned Paradise: The Forbidden Story of Monte Carlo =

1924 film by Louis J. Gasnier

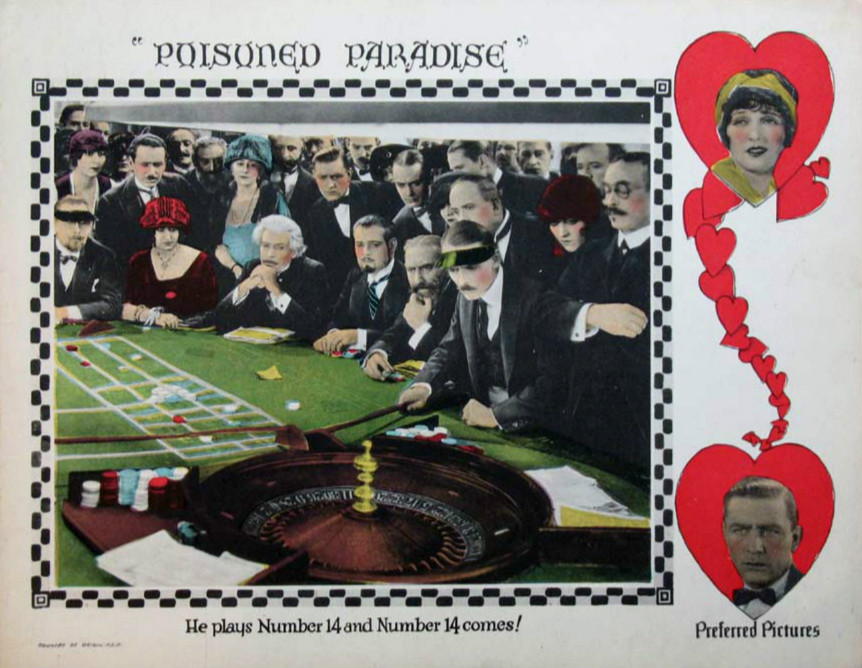
- Lobby card
- Directed by: Louis J. Gasnier
- Written by: Waldemar Young
- Based on: Poisoned Paradise; a Romance of Monte Carlo by Robert W. Service
- Produced by: B. P. Schulberg
- Starring: Kenneth Harlan; Clara Bow
- Cinematography: Karl Struss
- Distributed by: Al Lichtman Productions; Preferred Pictures
- Release date: February 29, 1924
- Running time: 70 minutes; 7 reels
- Country: United States
- Language: Silent (English intertitles)

Poisoned Paradise: The Forbidden Story of Monte Carlo is a 1924 American silent romantic drama film directed by Louis Gasnier and starring Kenneth Harlan and Clara Bow. B. P. Schulberg, Bow's new mentor at the time, produced the picture.

== Plot ==
As described in a film magazine review, Margot Le Blanc, left a small fortune by her foster mother, goes to Monte Carlo and loses it all gambling. When she is falling into the hands of a scheming thief, she meets Hugh Kildair, an artist that lives in the same house. After hearing her story, he suggests that she become his housekeeper under an arrangement where they shall live together as brother and sister, to which she agrees. Later, Hugh falls into a trap set by a gang of thieves involving their accomplice Mrs. Belmire. The aim of the gang is to force Hugh to reveal a cipher system entrusted to him by old Professor Durand. The plans of the gang are foiled by the arrival of the police. This experience has opened Hugh's eyes to the fact that he loves Margot, who has loved him all along. They are married without delay and return home this time as husband and wife.

== Cast ==
- Kenneth Harlan as Hugh Kildair / Gilbert Kildair
- Clara Bow as Margot Le Blanc
- Carmel Myers as Mrs. Belmire
- Raymond Griffith as Martel, The Rat
- Barbara Tennant as Mrs. G. Kildair
- Josef Swickard as Professor Durand
- George Beranger as Krantz (credited as Andre de Beranger)
- Evelyn Selbie as Madame Tanquille
- Victor Varconi as Dr. Berqius (credited as Michael Varconi)
- Frankie Lee as Hugh Kildair, as a Child
- Peaches Jackson as Margot LeBlanc, as a Child
- Betsy Ann Hisle as Little Girl Feeding Pigeons (uncredited)
- Laura La Varnie as Concierge (uncredited)
- Rolfe Sedan as Onlooker at Roulette Table (uncredited)

== Preservation ==
A 35mm nitrate print of Poisoned Paradise is held in the UCLA Film & Television Archive. However, it only contains 5 reels of 7 total due to nitrate deterioration. Some elements of the film were lost, but "stills were used to fill in the visuals". A video of the preserved film is publicly available at the website of the National Film Preservation Foundation.
