= Red Blood and Blue =

1925 film

- Directed by: James C. Hutchinson
- Written by: Guinn 'Big Boy' Williams
- Starring: Guinn 'Big Boy' Williams; Peggy O'Day; Frank Baker
- Cinematography: James C. Hutchinson
- Production company: Robertson-Cole Pictures Corporation
- Distributed by: Aywon Film Corporation
- Release date: February 25, 1925
- Running time: 50 minutes
- Country: United States
- Languages: Silent; English intertitles

Red Blood and Blue is a 1925 American silent Western film directed by James C. Hutchinson and starring Guinn 'Big Boy' Williams, Peggy O'Day, and Frank Baker.

== Plot ==
As described in a film magazine review, Tom Butler becomes an outcast when he displeases his father. He goes West and, while convalescing from a broken ankle, he is told to guard certificates for valuable stock. The rival gang, however, gets possession of the certificates. Tom is suspected. He rides away when the Sheriff's posse arrives and captures the crooks in their cabin and recovers the certificates.

== Cast ==
- Guinn 'Big Boy' Williams as Tom Butler
- Peggy O'Day as Leona Lane
- John Barley as Dave Butler
- Fred J. Butler as Jim Lane
- Frank Baker as Bill Gronn
- Irvin Woffard as Pete Smith
- Oliver Drake as Slim

== Bibliography ==
- Langman, Larry. A Guide to Silent Westerns. Greenwood Publishing Group, 1992.
