= The Sundown Trail =

1919 American silent Western film

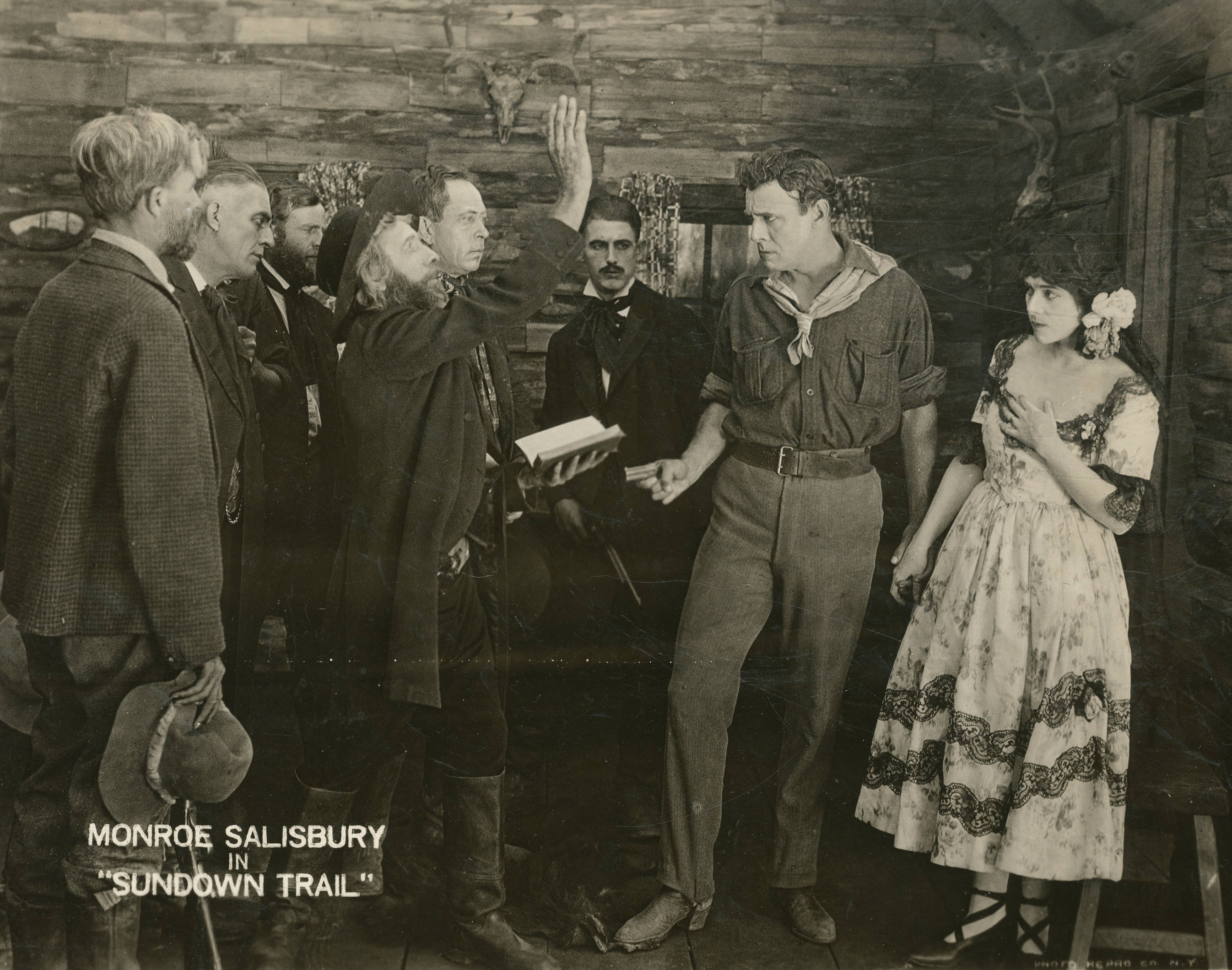
- Still of the wedding
- Directed by: Rollin S. Sturgeon
- Written by: Waldemar Young (scenario)
- Story by: J. G. Hawks
- Produced by: Carl Laemmle
- Starring: Monroe Salisbury
- Cinematography: Edward A. Kull
- Distributed by: Universal Film Manufacturing Company
- Release date: August 31, 1919
- Running time: 6 reels
- Country: United States
- Languages: Silent; English intertitles

Sundown Trail is a lost 1919 American silent Western film directed by Rollin S. Sturgeon and starring Monroe Salisbury. It was produced and released by the Universal Film Manufacturing Company.

== Cast ==
- Monroe Salisbury as "Quiet" Carter
- Clyde Fillmore as Velvet Eddy
- Alice Claire Elliott as The Girl
- Beatrice Dominguez as Mexican Girl
- Carl Stockdale as The Planter
