= Peggy O'Dare =

American actress

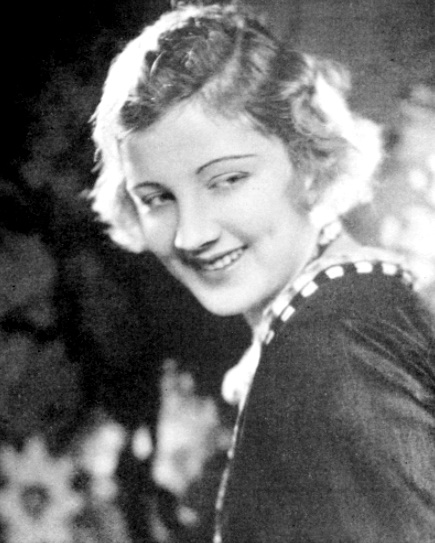
- Peggy O'Dare c. 1920
- Born: Ella Aarup; September 3, 1898; Staten Island, New York City, US
- Died: August 24, 1959 (aged 60)
- Occupation: Film actress
- Spouse: Albert Pegg

Peggy O'Dare (born Ella Aarup; September 3, 1898 – August 24, 1959) was an American actress active during Hollywood's silent era. She is often confused with fellow silent-era actress Peggy O'Day.

== Biography ==
O'Dare was born on Staten Island to Niels Aarup and Augusta Geshke, both of whom hailed from Denmark. She was one of the youngest of the couple's many children, most of whom were born back in Denmark. She graduated from San Pedro High School.

O'Dare had lead roles in films for the L-KO Kompany. Her films included In the Balance, For Life and The Vanishing Dagger (a serial).

In 1920, O'Dare married oil engineer Albert O. Pegg in Bakersfield, California.
