= Peggy O'Day =

American actress

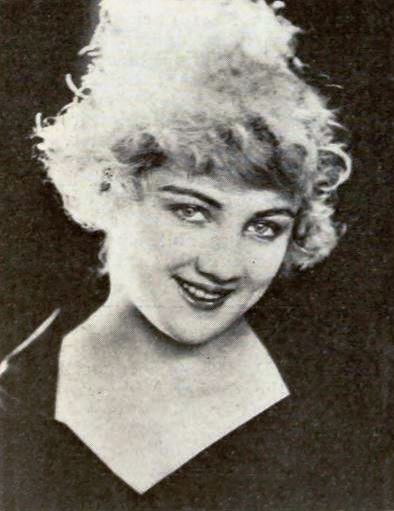
- Born: Genevieve Berte; June 16, 1900; Ohio
- Died: November 25, 1964 (aged 64); California
- Occupations: Actress, film editor, stuntwoman
- Spouse: Earl Reis

Peggy O'Day (born Genevieve Berte, June 16, 1900 - November 25, 1964) was an American actress, film editor, screenwriter, and stuntwoman active during the 1920s and 1930s. She was sometimes credited under her birth name. and she is often confused with fellow silent-era actress Peggy O'Dare.

== Biography ==
O'Day was born in Ohio to Harry Berte and Maude Hopkins. Her father was a professional baseball player. She was raised in Kentucky and Missouri, and was the couple's only child. She said that she grew up poor, and she later gave donations to children's charities as an adult.

O'Day moved to Los Angeles in her teens to begin her career as an actress and found work as a Christie bathing beauty. In 1921, she rejected an offer to join the Orpheum circuit as a vaudeville star.

After appearing in comedies early in her career, she quickly developed a reputation as an accomplished horse rider and pioneering stuntwoman in Westerns. She even trained with boxer Kid McCoy to prepare for fight scenes. In 1923, she changed her name to Peggy O'Day, believing the name would be advantageous to her career.

After an accident sustained on set caused her to retire from acting, she took on a new role: film editor. She was in charge of editing all of MGM's foreign releases during the early 1930s, and became an executive of the studio's international department.

She married Earl Reis, a motion picture sound engineer, in 1934; he died several years later in 1939 from complications related to injuries he sustained in World War I, where he worked as an aviator. The couple had no children together.

She retired in 1960, and died on November 25, 1964.

== Selected filmography ==
As an actress:

- His Last Bullet (1928)
- The Clean-Up Man (1928)
- Hoof Marks (1927)
- The Lone Ranger (1927) (short)
- The Four from Nowhere (1925)
- Red Blood and Blue (1925)
- Sporting West (1925)
- Rose of the Desert (1925)
- Riders of Mystery (1925)
- Whistling Jim (1925)
- Ace of the Law (1924)
- Battlin’ Buckaroo (1924)
- Fast and Furious (1924)
- Shootin' Square (1924)
- Up and at ’Em (1924)
- The Fighting Skipper (1923)
- Angel Citizens (1922)
- Storm Girl (1922)
- They're Off (1922)
- Thundering Hoofs (1922)
- Trail's End (1922)
- Cross Roads (1922)
- The Three Buckaroos (1922)
- Gold Grabbers (1922)
- So This Is Arizona (1922)
- Miracles of the Jungle (1921)
- The Struggle (1921)
- The Galloping Devil (1920)

As an editor:

- Cheri-Bibi (1931)
- Su Ultima Noche (1931)
- En Cada Puerto un Amor (1931)
- El Presidio (1930)
- Olimpia (1930)

As writer:

- The Four from Nowhere (1925)
- Whistling Jim (1925)
