= The Conquering Power =

1921 film by Rex Ingram

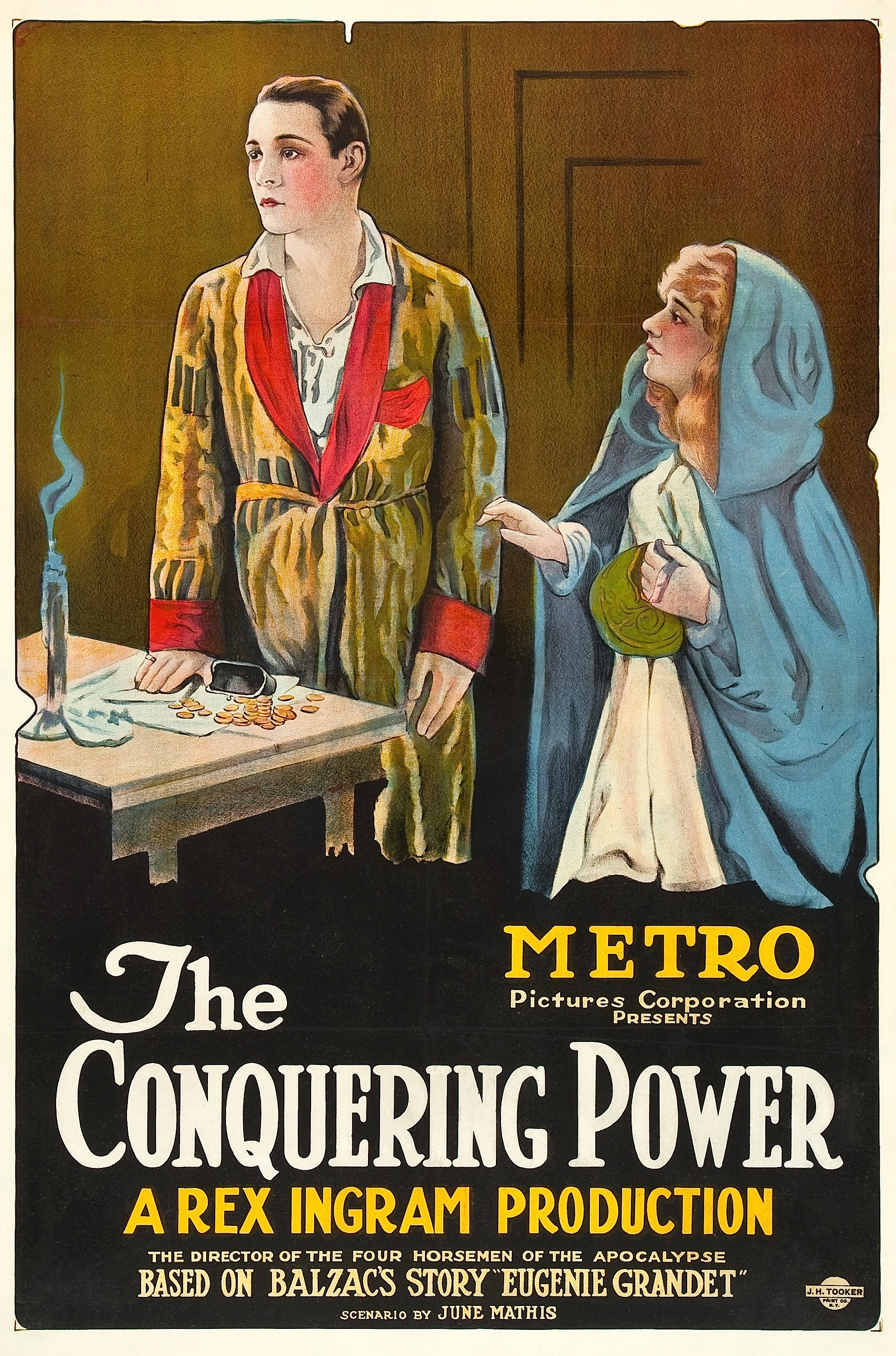
- Movie poster
- Directed by: Rex Ingram
- Written by: June Mathis
- Based on: Eugénie Grandet; 1833 novel by Honoré de Balzac
- Produced by: Rex Ingram
- Starring: Rudolph Valentino; Alice Terry; Ralph Lewis
- Cinematography: John F. Seitz
- Distributed by: Metro Pictures
- Release date: July 8, 1921 (United States)
- Running time: 89 minutes
- Country: United States
- Languages: Silent; English intertitles

The Conquering Power

The Conquering Power is a 1921 American silent romantic drama directed by Rex Ingram and starring Rudolph Valentino, Alice Terry, and Ralph Lewis. The film was based on the 1833 novel Eugénie Grandet by Honoré de Balzac. Its sets were designed by Ralph Barton.

== Plot ==
After the death of his father, young dandy Charles Grandet (Rudolph Valentino) is taken under the care of his uncle, Monsieur Grandet (Ralph Lewis). The miserly Grandet, despite being the wealthiest man in his province, forces his family to live in poverty and schemes to cheat his nephew out of his inheritance from his father.

Charles falls in love with Grandet's daughter Eugenie (Alice Terry) but Grandet condemns their love, and sends Charles away. While Charles is away, Grandet kills Eugenie's mother, which sends him further into a maddened state. Later, it is revealed that Eugenie is not really Monsieur Grandet's daughter; if she knew, then she could reclaim all of the gold that originally belonged to her mother, leaving her father penniless. Monsieur Grandet has a violent argument with Eugenie, after she finds letters sent by Charles that her father had hidden, and Monsieur Grandet accidentally locks himself in a small room where he keeps his gold. He starts hallucinating and is eventually killed after becoming frantic.

Eugenie is now left an extremely wealthy young lady, which only intensifies the pressure put on her by two competing families to marry one of the suitors. She announces her engagement, but shortly after is reunited with Charles.

== Cast ==
- Alice Terry as Eugenie Grandet
- Rudolph Valentino as Charles Grandet
- Ralph Lewis as Père Grandet
- Carrie Daumery as Madame Grandet
- Bridgetta Clark as Madame des Grassins
- Mark Fenton as Monsieur des Grassins
- Ward Wing as Adolphe des Grassins
- Eric Mayne as Victor Grandet
- Edward Connelly as Notary Cruchot
- George Atkinson as Bonfons Cruchot
- Willard Lee Hall as Abbé Cruchot

== Reception ==
A review from Photoplay claims that "The thoughtfully worked out characterizations and the general atmosphere are not only faithful to Balzac but go to make absorbing and valuable entertainment."
