= The Four Horsemen of the Apocalypse (1921 film) =

1921 film by Rex Ingram

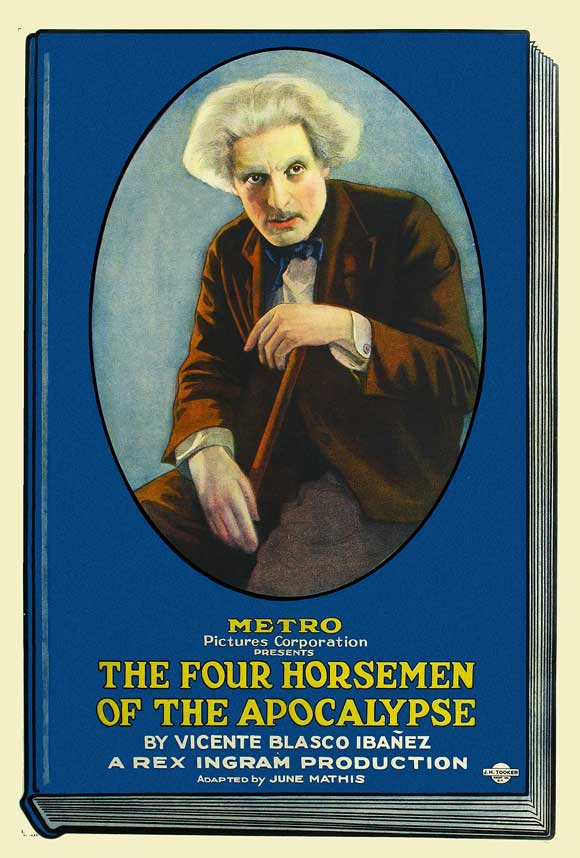
- Theatrical release poster
- Directed by: Rex Ingram
- Screenplay by: June Mathis
- Based on: The Four Horsemen of the Apocalypse; 1916 novel by Vicente Blasco Ibáñez
- Produced by: Rex Ingram
- Starring: Pomeroy Cannon; Josef Swickard; Bridgetta Clark; Rudolph Valentino; Wallace Beery; Alice Terry
- Cinematography: John F. Seitz
- Edited by: Grant Whytock
- Music by: Louis F. Gottschalk
- Production company: Rex Ingram Productions
- Distributed by: Metro Pictures
- Release date: March 6, 1921 (US)
- Running time: 134 minutes (edited version); 156 minutes (complete version)
- Country: United States
- Languages: Silent; English intertitles
- Budget: $800,000 or $1 million
- Box office: $9.2 million or $4 million (world gross)

The Four Horsemen of the Apocalypse is a 1921 American silent epic war film produced by Metro Pictures Corporation and directed by Rex Ingram. Based on the 1916 Spanish novel The Four Horsemen of the Apocalypse, by Vicente Blasco Ibáñez, it was adapted for the screen by June Mathis. The film stars Pomeroy Cannon, Josef Swickard, Bridgetta Clark, Rudolph Valentino, Wallace Beery, and Alice Terry.

Often regarded as one of the first anti-war films, it had a huge cultural impact and became the top-grossing film of 1921 by beating out Charlie Chaplin's The Kid. The film turned the little-known actor Rudolph Valentino into a superstar and associated him with the image of the Latin lover. The film also inspired a tango craze and such fashion fads as gaucho pants. The film was written by June Mathis, who, by its success, became one of the most powerful women in Hollywood of the time.

In 1995, The Four Horsemen of the Apocalypse was selected for preservation in the United States National Film Registry by the Library of Congress as being "culturally, historically, or aesthetically significant." The film is now in the public domain. A DVD version was released in 2000. In March 2025, Warner Archive released a Blu-ray version of the film.

== Plot ==
The Four Horsemen of the Apocalypse (edited version)

Madariaga "The Centaur" (Pomeroy Cannon), a harsh but popular Argentine landowner, has a German son-in-law, Karl von Hartrott, whom he dislikes and a French one, Marcelo Desnoyers, whose family he openly favors. He is particularly fond of his grandson, Julio (Rudolph Valentino), with whom he often carouses at seedy dives in the Boca district of Buenos Aires. In one of those bars, a man and a woman (Beatrice Dominguez) are dancing the tango. Julio strides up and asks to cut in. The woman stares at Julio alluringly. The man brushes him off, and they resume dancing. Julio then challenges the man, strikes him, and knocks him into some tables and out of the scene. Julio and the woman then dance a dramatic version of the tango that brings cheers from the people in the establishment. After the dance, the woman sits on Julio's lap. Madariaga then drunkenly slides to the floor. The woman laughs at Madariaga. Julio casts her aside in scorn and helps his grandfather home.

Some time later, Madariaga dies. The extended family breaks up, one half returning to Germany and the other to France.

In Paris, Julio enjoys a somewhat shiftless life as a would-be artist and sensation at the local tea dances. He falls in love with Marguerite Laurier (Alice Terry), the unhappy and much younger wife by an arranged marriage of Etienne Laurier, a friend of Julio's father. The affair is discovered, and Marguerite's husband agrees to give her a divorce to avoid a scandal. It seems as if Julio and Marguerite will be able to marry, but both end up getting caught up in the start of the Great War.

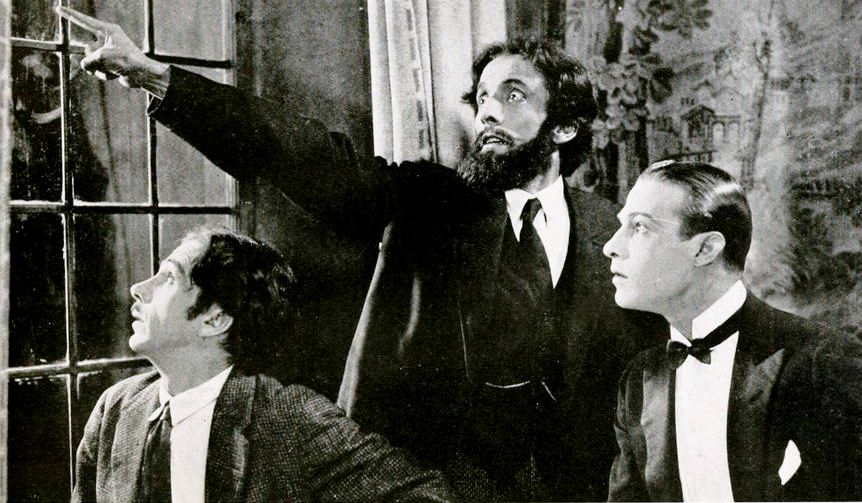
Tchernoff (Nigel de Brulier) shows Julio (Valentino) and his manservant (Bowditch M. Turner) the Four Horsemen.

Marguerite becomes a nurse in Lourdes. The bravery of Etienne is reported, and he is blinded in battle. Etienne happens to end up at the hospital at which she works, and Marguerite attends to him there. Julio travels to Lourdes to see Marguerite but sees her taking care of Etienne. Julio, ashamed of his wastrel life, enlists in the French Army.

In the meantime, the German Army overruns Marcelo's Marne valley castle at the First Battle of the Marne. Marcelo is forced to host a German general and staff in the castle. One of Marcelo's three German nephews is among the staff and tries to protect him, but Marcelo is arrested after a mêlée involving an officer's assault of a woman. Marcelo is to be executed in the morning, but his life is spared when the French Army counterattacks during the "Miracle of the Marne". The castle is destroyed by the French counterattack.

Four years later, Julio has survived and become renowned for his bravery in the trenches at the front. During a mission in no man's land, he encounters his last surviving German cousin. Moments later, they are both killed by a shell. Back in Paris, Marguerite considers abandoning the blinded Etienne, but Julio's ghost guides her to continue her care for him.

The ending scene shows Marcelo Desnoyers mourning over his son's grave. The man who lived upstairs from Julio watches over him. Marcelo asks him, "Did you know my son?" The man, with a remorseful expression, lifts his arms, forming the shape of a cross with his body, and says, "I knew them all!" He then points to the sky and shows Marcelo the Four Horsemen of the Apocalypse riding away into the clouds. Then, the man assures him that "Peace has come—but the Four Horsemen will still ravage humanity—stirring unrest in the world—until all hatred is dead and only love reigns in the heart of mankind."

== Cast ==
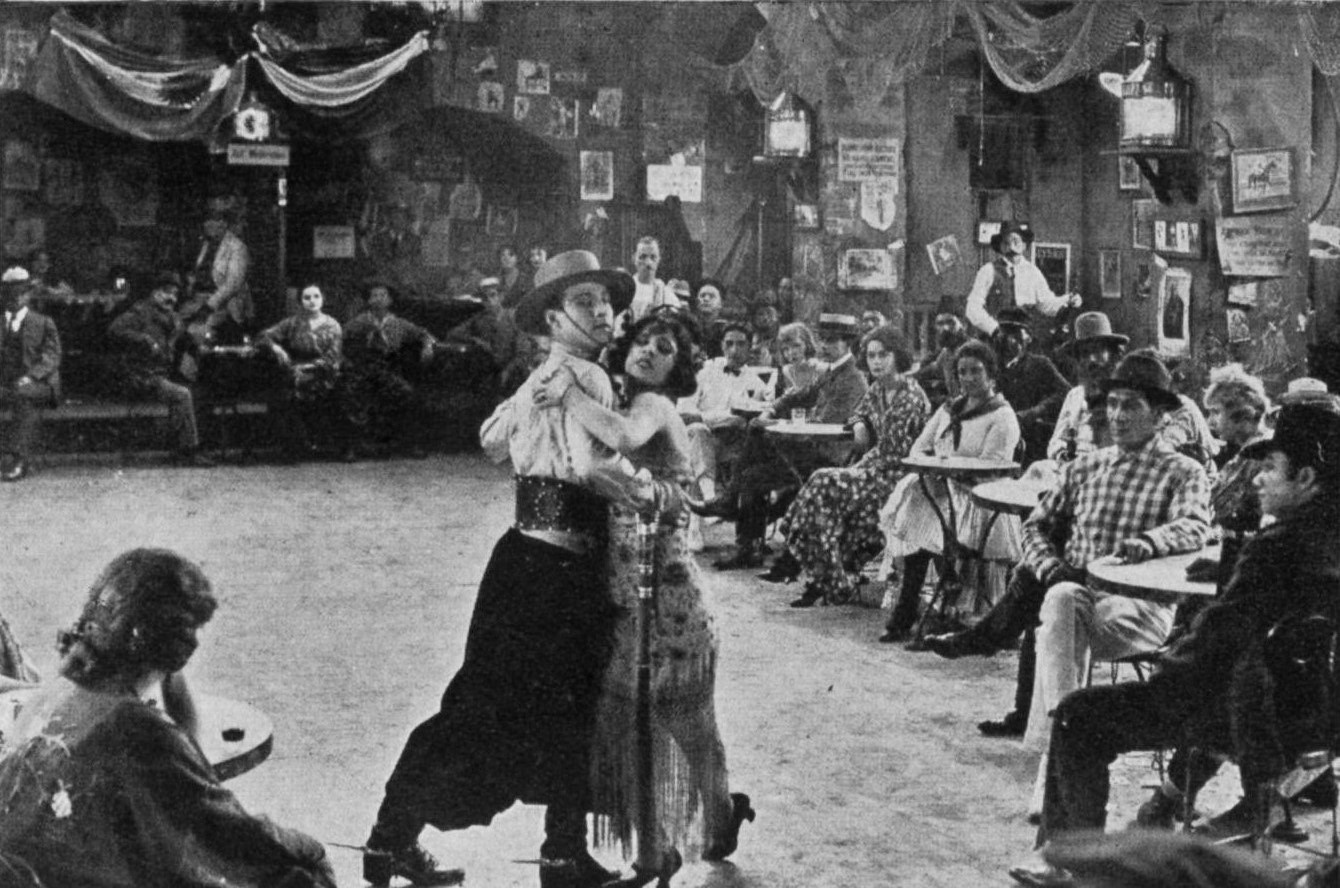
The tango sequence with Valentino dancing with Beatrice Dominguez

- Pomeroy Cannon as Madariaga
- Josef Swickard as Marcelo Desnoyers
- Bridgetta Clark as Doña Luisa
- Rudolph Valentino as Julio Desnoyers
- Virginia Warwick as Chichí
- Alan Hale as Karl von Hartrott
- Mabel Van Buren as Elena
- Stuart Holmes as Otto von Hartrott
- John St. Polis as Etienne Laurier
- Alice Terry as Marguerite Laurier
- Mark Fenton as Senator Lacour
- Derek Ghent as René Lacour
- Nigel De Brulier as Tchernoff
- Bowditch M. Turner as Argensola
- Edward Connelly as Lodgekeeper
- Wallace Beery as Lieut. Col. von Richthosen
- Harry Northrup as The General
- Arthur Hoyt as Lieut. Schnitz
- Beatrice Dominguez as the dancer
- Steve Murphy as Drunkard In Saloon

== Extras ==
Among the actors who appear as the focus of a scene but had no words was African American actress Anita Thompson.

== Production ==
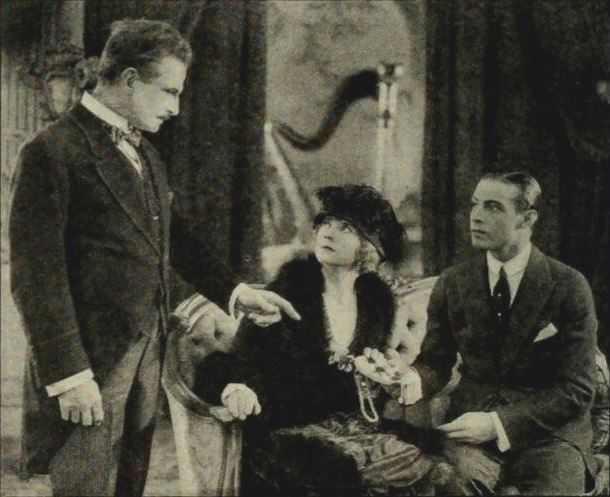
The affair between Julio (Valentino) and Marguerite (Terry) was considered scandalous by many for its time, as Marguerite was married to Etienne Laurier (St. Polis).

In 1919, screenwriter June Mathis became head of the scenario department for Metro Pictures. With this position, she became one of the first female executives in film history. Holding a major belief in Spiritualism and the Book of Revelation, Mathis was determined to turn Vicente Blasco Ibáñez's novel The Four Horsemen of the Apocalypse into a film. The book had been a bestseller, but most studios found it impossible to adapt to film.

Mathis's adaptation so impressed the studio that it asked for her input in director and star. For director, she chose Rex Ingram, who would clash with both her and Valentino. Mathis had seen a young actor named Rudolph Valentino in a bit part of a Clara Kimball Young film, Eyes of Youth, in 1919. Valentino had arrived in Hollywood in 1918, where he had worked in many B movies, including All Night with Carmel Myers and The Delicious Little Devil with Mae Murray. He also worked on a picture with Julian Eltinge and Virginia Rappe that would eventually become The Isle of Love. It has been suggested that Mathis might have seen him first in that film, as she was a close friend of Eltinge.

Mathis insisted that Valentino would play Julio, but studio executives were nervous with the young actor. Valentino, whose parents were French and Italian, had a distinctly-Latin look that was not used much in pictures at the time. However, Mathis got her way, and after seeing the rushes, she and Ingram decided to expand the role of Julio to showcase the talents of Valentino. Valentino had worked as a taxi dancer during his time in New York. To show off his dancing skills, the tango scene was included though it had not been part of the original story.

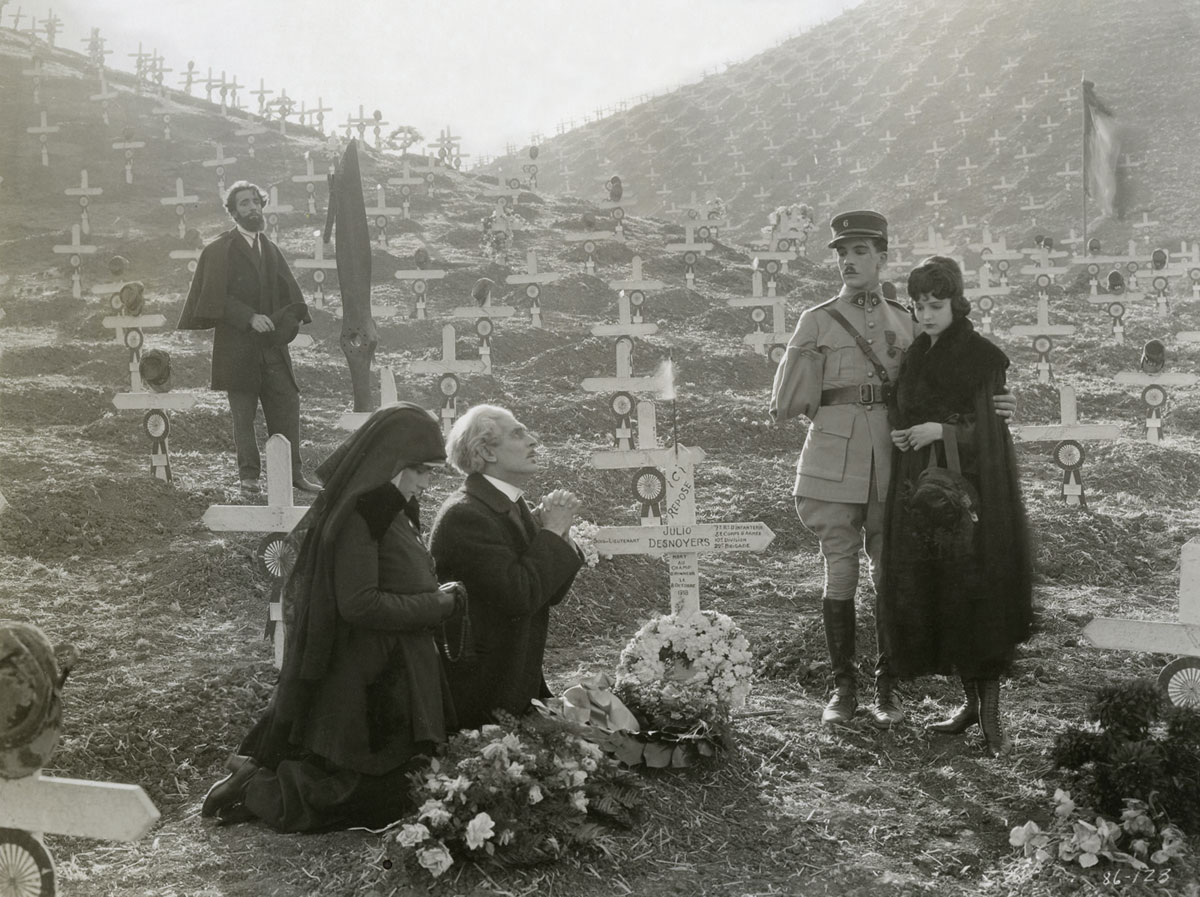
The Four Horsemen of the Apocalypse did not glorify war or look past the losses of war, as seen in this film still.

Alice Terry was cast as Julio's lover, Marguerite. She would marry Ingram that same year.

Metro paid Ibañez $20,000 and 10% of the gross earnings for the rights to adapt his novel. The film took six months to shoot, cost $800,000, and had a cast of 72 "principal players." Valentino was paid only $350 a week, which was much less than other players. To add to his troubles, he also had to provide his own costumes, which cost thousands. The French Marne village was constructed at Griffith Park, in Los Angeles. In the scenes between Julio and Marguerite, Valentino and Terry spoke French to impress lip readers. Valentino was fluent in French, as his mother was French.

Mathis also injected some early depictions of LGBTQ+ individuals and the breaking of gender norms into the picture. The camera alights ever so briefly on what appears to be a pair of lesbians sitting together at the tango club, and features a scene with German officers coming down the stairs in drag. Of the scene, Mathis would later tell the Los Angeles Times, "I had the German officers coming down the stairs with women's clothing on. To hundreds of people that meant no more than a masquerade party. To those who have lived and read, and who understand life, that scene stood out as one of the most terrific things in the picture."

== Reception ==
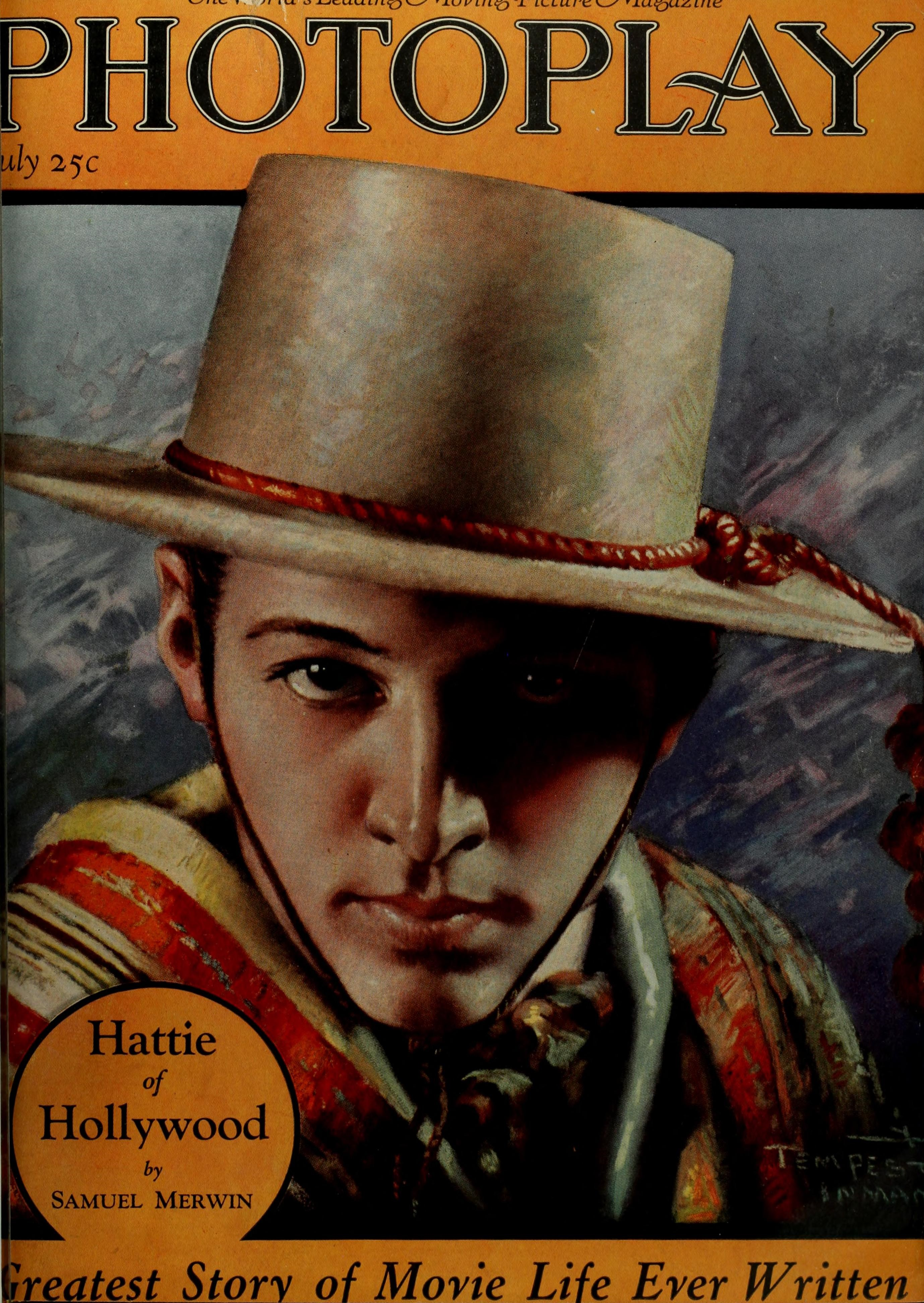
Valentino on 1922 cover of Photoplay in his film costume as Julio; illustration by Tempest Inman

The film premiered in New York to great critical acclaim. Many critics hailed it as a new The Birth of a Nation. However, the German press was less enthused with the portrayal of Germans in the film.

The film became a commercial success as well, and was one of the first films to make $1,000,000 at the box office. The film is considered to be the sixth-best-selling silent film of all time. During its initial run, it grossed $4,500,000 domestically.

With its extended scenes of the devastated French countryside and personalized story of loss, The Four Horsemen of the Apocalypse is often considered to be one of the first anti-war films made.

Some aspects of the film were controversial with American film censorship boards. For example, the Pennsylvania board, upon reviewing the affair between Julio and Marguerite, required that Marguerite be described in intertitles as being the fiancée of Etienne Laurier rather than his wife.

Picture-Play Magazine reviewed The Four Horsemen of the Apocalypse in their April 1921 issue, saying "The Four Horsemen may have been a spectacular and million-dollar flivver. As it is, it is an artistic triumph." They also praised the cast. "Rudolph Valentino plays the role of Julio Desnoyers. He is such a fine actor that you forget how handsome he is and how well he dances. Alice Terry as Marguerite looks and acts like another Blanche Sweet. In plain and simple words, the cast is a wonder."

The film made Mathis one of the most powerful and respected women in Hollywood, said to be only second to Mary Pickford. She was one of the highest-paid executives of her time and went on to work with Famous Players–Lasky and Goldwyn Pictures. She became known for her association with Valentino, who became a close friend. She wrote many more films for him, helping to shape his image.

Julio proved to be a breakthrough role for Valentino, who became a superstar overnight. He became heavily associated with the image of a "Latin lover", though eventually his image as "The Sheik" may have overshadowed this. Metro refused to acknowledge that they had made a star and immediately put him into a B-picture titled Uncharted Seas. Valentino soon left them for Famous Players–Lasky.

The film also helped launch the name of Ingram. Ingram came to resent the break-out success of Valentino, as he felt it was his own work that made Four Horsemen a success. He went on to make films with Terry and eventually discovered Ramon Novarro, whom he promoted as the new Valentino and who appeared as an extra in this film.

== Adaptations and remakes ==
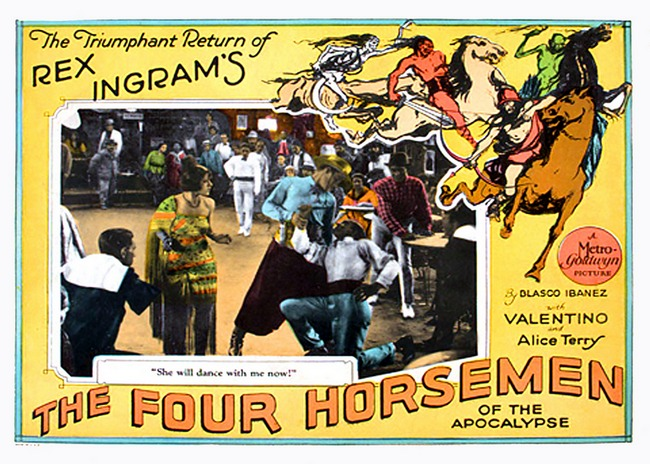
Lobby card for the film

The film was remade as The 4 Horsemen of the Apocalypse (1962), with the setting changed to World War II. Vincente Minnelli was the director.

== In popular culture ==
- In Jack Finney's "Marion's Wall," the narrator and Marion attend a screening, and Valentino's ghost shows up to watch his tango with Dominguez.

== See also ==
- List of highest-grossing films
- National Film Registry
