= The Fighting Skipper =

1923 film

- Directed by: Francis Ford
- Starring: Peggy O'Day; Jack Perrin
- Release date: April 30, 1923
- Running time: 15 episodes (300 minutes)
- Country: United States
- Languages: Silent; English intertitles

The Fighting Skipper is a 1923 American adventure film serial directed by Francis Ford. The film is considered to be lost.

== Cast ==
- Peggy O'Day (as Skipper)
- Jack Perrin
- William White (as Bill White)
- Francis Ford
- Steve Murphy as Slippery Goldstein

== See also ==
- List of film serials
- List of film serials by studio
- List of lost films
