= Steve Murphy (actor) =

American film actor (1876–1953)

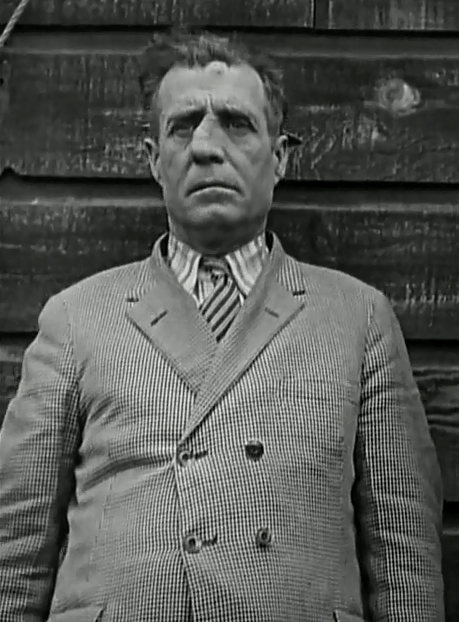
- Murphy in The Circus (1928)
- Born: Stephen M. Clancey; December 25, 1876; Providence, Rhode Island, U.S.
- Died: January 31, 1953 (aged 76); California, U.S.
- Other names: Broken Nose Murphy
- Occupation: Actor
- Years active: 1911–1930s

Steve Murphy (born Stephen M. Clancey; December 25, 1876 – January 31, 1953), also known as Broken Nose Murphy, was an American character actor of the silent-film era. Known for his tough-guy appearance and flattened nose, he often portrayed aggressive or villainous characters.

== Biography ==
Very little is known about Murphy's early life before entering the film industry. There are some references to a previous boxing career, but no records can be found, and it may have been a fabrication by the publicity department to fit his appearance.

He started his career around 1915 – at the age of 39 – as a property man been doing general work about the California studios and lots and he soon transitioned into acting. Nicknamed "Broken Nose Murphy" due to his distinctive facial features, he frequently played henchmen, conmen, and roughneck characters.

Murphy's biggest role was in Charlie Chaplin's The Circus (1928) in which he has a long scene trying to recover a stolen wallet he placed in the Tramp's trousers.

He is the only actor of the era to appear with all four comedy legends: Chaplin, Buster Keaton, Harold Lloyd, and Laurel and Hardy.

Murphy's film career ended with the arrival of the talkies.

== Selected filmography ==
- 1914: Leading Lizzie Astray as Sailor Café Patron (uncredited)
- 1916: The Girl from Frisco as Siwash
- 1916: A Law Unto Himself as Pascal, a Mexican
- 1918: M'Liss as Man at Trial (uncredited)
- 1918: Johanna Enlists as Mortimer
- 1919: Rolling Stone as Convict
- 1919: Broken Blossoms as Fight Spectator
- 1920: Outside the Law as Member of Black Mike's Gang (uncredited)
- 1921: The Four Horsemen of the Apocalypse as Drunkard in Saloon
- 1922: Cops as Conman Selling Furniture (uncredited)
- 1922: They Like 'Em Rough as Grogan
- 1922: The Electric House as Real Electrical Engineer
- 1923: The Love Nest as Member of Ship's Crew (uncredited)
- 1923: The Fighting Skipper as Slippery Goldstein
- 1923: The Extra Girl as Party Guest
- 1923: The Shock as Man Eating at Mandarin Café
- 1924: Fools Highway as Chuck Connors
- 1924: Sherlock Jr. as Conspirator (uncredited)
- 1925: The Flame Fighter as Bandit
- 1925: White Fang as 'Beauty' Smith
- 1925: Sally of the Sawdust as Bandit
- 1925: The Gold Rush as Man in Dance Hall (uncredited)
- 1926: Justice of the Far North as Broken Nose McGee
- 1926: For Heaven's Sake as Tough Guy in Pool Hall
- 1927: The Battle of the Century as Noah Young's Assistant
- 1927: For the Term of His Natural Life as Jeremy Vetch
- 1928: The Circus as The Pickpocket
- 1928: Speedy as Gangster (uncredited)

== External links and sources ==
- Steve Murphy at IMDb
- Merton, Paul (2009). Silent Comedy. London: Arrow. p. 282. ISBN 978-0-09-951013-0.
- Mallory, Mary (June 27, 2016). "Hollywood Heights: Steve "Broken Nose" Murphy Slays Them in the Movies". LA Daily Mirror.
- "Steve Murphy". MUBI.
- "Steve Murphy". Letterboxd.
