= Angel Citizens =

1922 film

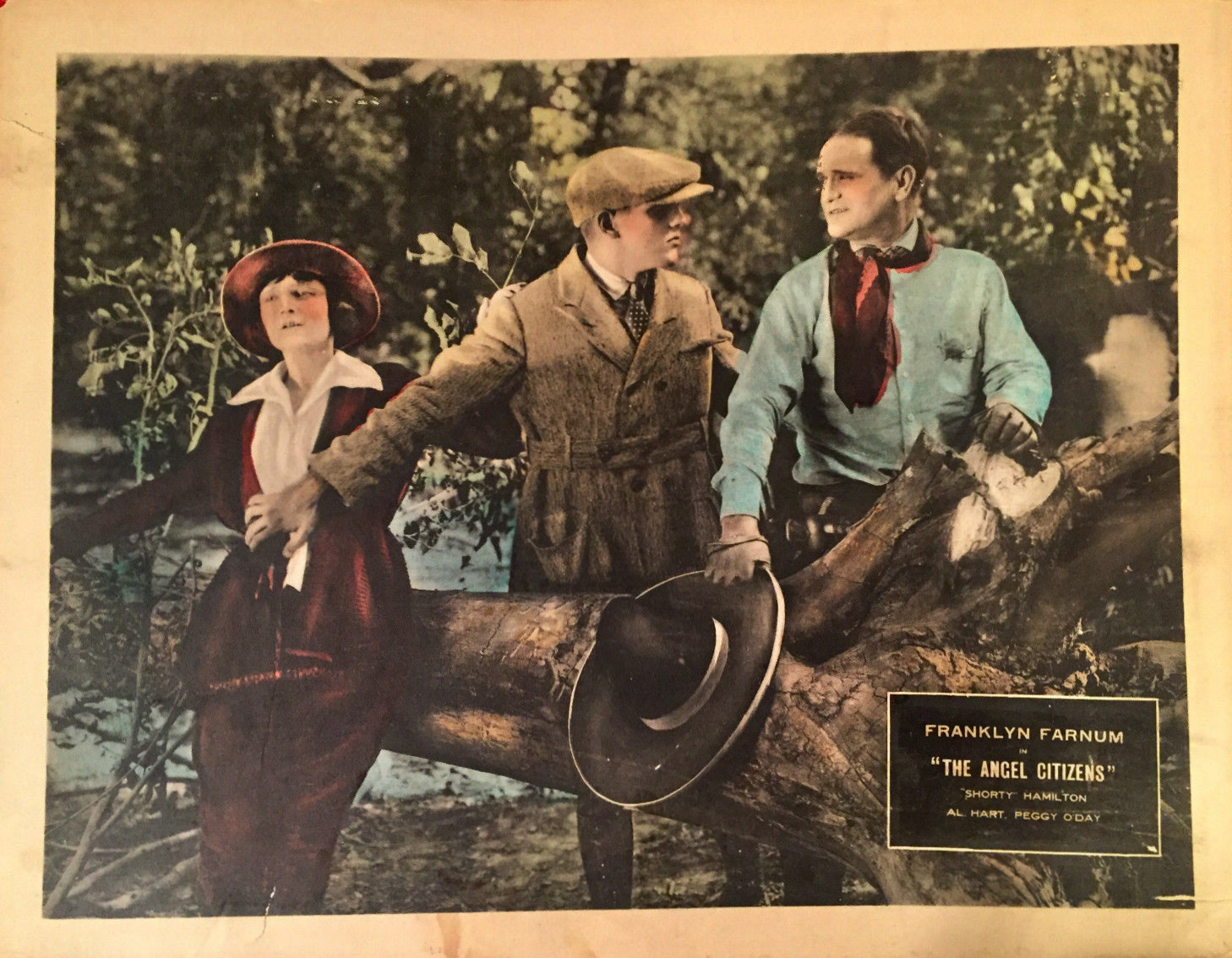
- Lobby card
- Directed by: Francis Ford
- Produced by: William M. Smith
- Starring: Franklyn Farnum; Peggy O'Day; Shorty Hamilton
- Cinematography: Reginald Lyons
- Production company: William M. Smith Productions
- Distributed by: Merit Film Corporation
- Release date: July 1922
- Running time: 50 minutes
- Country: United States
- Languages: Silent; English intertitles

Angel Citizens is a 1922 American silent Western film directed by Francis Ford and starring Franklyn Farnum, Peggy O'Day and Shorty Hamilton.

== Plot ==
"Angel City is a misnomer. A gang of outlaws is largely in control and when Isabelle Bruner's father is mysteriously killed the sheriff decides to get busy. Frank Bartlett, an idler who could afford to be idle, appeared in town and took Isabelle to the country ball. In search of a new thrill, he decides to aid the sheriff, and the first thing he does is to scare away the would-be robbers of the stagecoach. This is only the beginning of a dramatic career which ends in his bringing home the honors, and winning the girl." --Moving Picture World

== Cast ==
- Franklyn Farnum as Frank Bartlett
- Al Hart as London Edwards
- Shorty Hamilton as 'Smoky' Nivette
- Peggy O'Day as Isabelle Bruner
- Max Hoffman as The Doctor
- Terris Hoffman as His Wife

== Preservation ==
With no holdings located in archive, Angel Citizens is considered a lost film.
