= W. H. Clifford =

American film writer and director

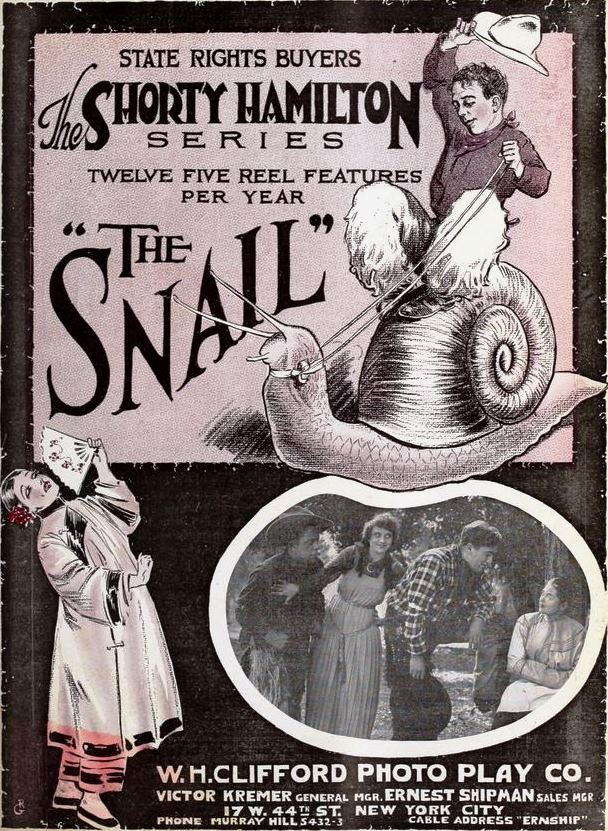
Advertisement for The Snail (1918)

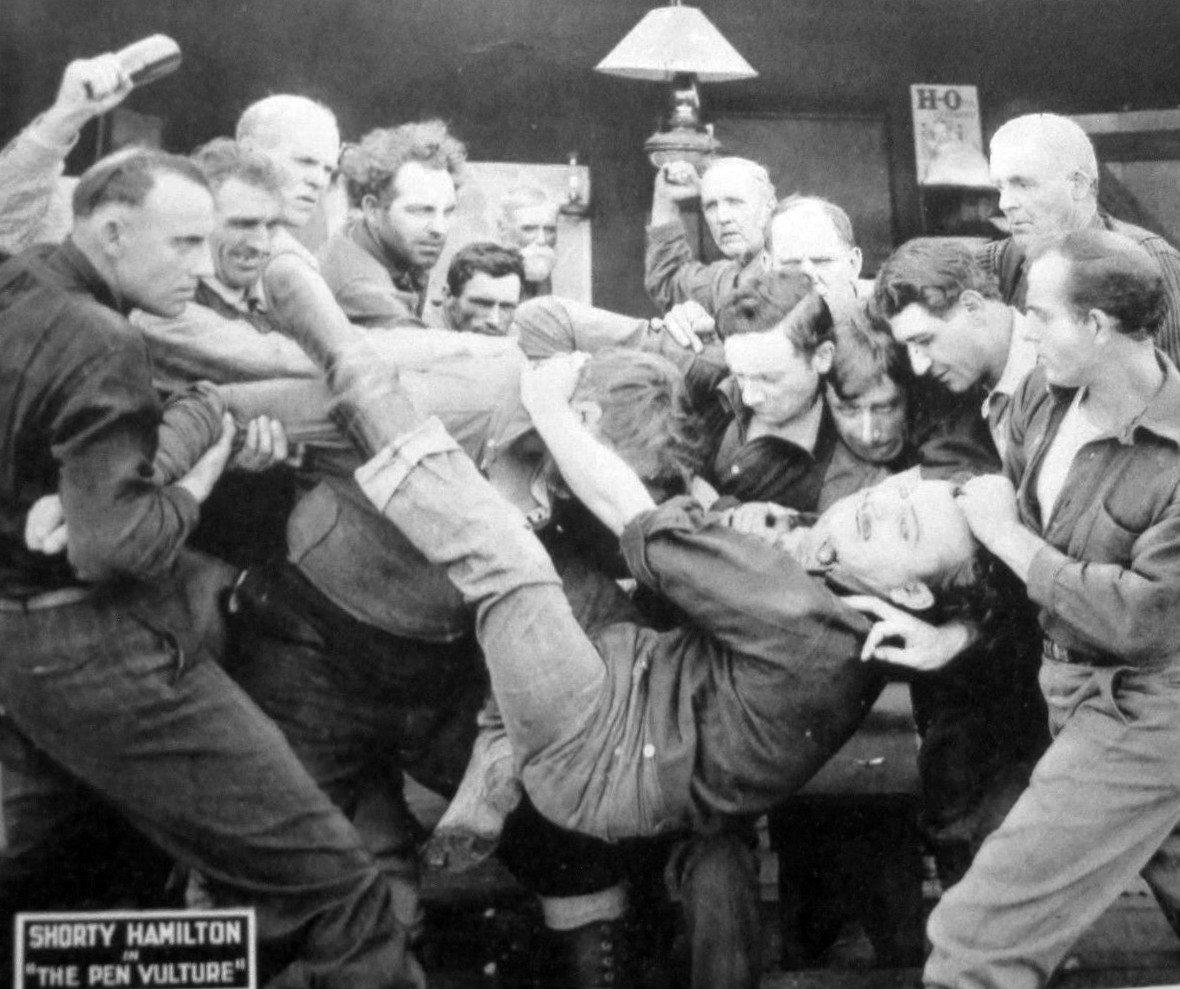
Lobby card for The Pen Vulture (1918)

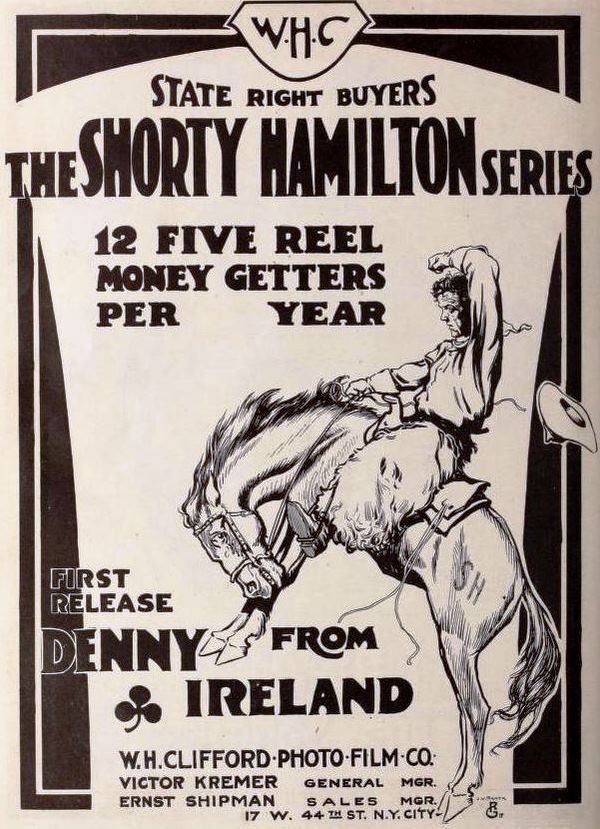
Advertisement for Denny from Ireland (1918)

William H. Clifford (died October 9, 1938) was a writer, director, and film company head during the silent film era. He was a production manager for Monogram Film Company. He worked for Marcus Loew and Thomas Ince.

He was born in Washington, D.C., and wrote vaudeville sketches before linking up with film producer Thomas Ince. Clifford wrote stories for the Famous Players studio before coming to California. He organized his own studio in 1917.

Victor Kremer managed his W. H. Clifford Photoplay Company film production business. It produced several Shorty Hamilton westerns and planned to produce more. It was located in Los Angeles.

Clifford wrote the scenarios for the studio's films.

== Theater ==
- Trapping Santa Claus (1912), a vaudeville act
- Mr. Aladdin (1914), written with Thomas H. Ince

== Partial filmography ==
- The Ranger (in five parts) starting Shorty Hamilton.
- The Snail (1918) the second offering from the W. H. Clifford Photoplay Company.
- The Pen Vulture (1918), writer and director. This was the fourth in the Shorty Hamilton series from the W. H. Clifford Photoplay Company.
- Denny from Ireland (1918), director
- Man Alone (1923)
- Souls in Bondage (1923)
- Missing Daughters (1924)
