= Bridgetta Clark =

American actress and acting teacher

- Born: Ruth Porter Clark; January 13, 1891; Chicago, Illinois, U.S.
- Died: October 10, 1980 (aged 89); Phoenix, Arizona, U.S.
- Occupations: Actress, acting teacher
- Years active: 1921–1928
- Spouse: Paul Earl Lobanoff (m. 1926; died 1974)
- Children: 1
- Relatives: Lincoln Clark (grandfather)

Bridgetta Clark (born Ruth Porter Clark, January 13, 1891 – October 10, 1980) was an American silent film actress. Her career was brief, having appeared in only seven films from 1921 to 1926. She was also on the faculty of Neely Dickson's Hollywood Community Theater, serving as assistant director and drama coach from 1922 to 1928.

== Career ==
A native of Illinois, Clark was the youngest of nine children born to Bridget "Gretta" Glennon and Lincoln Ellis Clark, and the granddaughter of Iowa Congressman Lincoln Clark.

Following a throat operation that severely impacted her vocal production, effectively ending any hopes of realizing her dream of an operatic career, Clark shifted her focus to acting, eventually studying with Theodora Ursula Irving, a New York-based teacher and fellow faculty member at Dickson's Hollywood Community Theater. Borrowing her mother's first name—both the formal and informal version—to arrive at the stage name Bridgetta, Clark made her film debut in 1921. Arguably her best known role, as the mother of Rudolph Valentino's character in The Four Horsemen of the Apocalypse, it was followed that same year by another pairing with Valentino and his Horsemen leading lady Alice Terry in The Conquering Power. Clark appeared in one more film in 1921, and one in 1922, before joining the faculty of Dickson's school. In the spring term, however, she was granted a leave of absence when she had the opportunity to make what would prove to be uncredited appearances in Rex Ingram's Scaramouche and Cecil B. DeMille's The Ten Commandments. Following her final screen appearance, in the 1926 drama The Greater Glory (based on Edith O'Shaughnessy's historical novel The Viennese Medley), Clark continued in a teaching capacity at least as late as the fall of 1931, when—as Bridget Clark Lobanoff—she supervised 200 students of John H. Francis Polytechnic High School in a pageant commemorating the 50th anniversary of the YWCA's Girl Reserves.

== Personal life and death ==
On October 3, 1926, Clark commemorated the 57th anniversary of her parents' wedding by becoming the wife of Russian-American electrical engineer Paul Earl Lobanoff. Following her retirement from acting, Clark continued—as Mrs. Paul Lobanoff—to speak in public on occasion, both in California and following their move to Phoenix, Arizona in 1957. As of 1960, she was the chair of the YWCA World Fellowship Committee.

On October 10, 1980, Clark died at the Village Green Nursing Home in Phoenix, Arizona. Predeceased by her husband, she was survived by her daughter and three grandchildren.

== Filmography ==
Year	Title	Role	Notes
1921	The Four Horsemen of the Apocalypse	Doña Luisa	
1921	The Conquering Power	Madame des Grassins	Alternative title: Eugenie Grandet
1921	Morals	Antoinette	
1922	The Golden Gift	Rosana	
1923	Scaramouche	Unknown role	Uncredited
1923	The Ten Commandments	One of the Israelite women surrounding Moses prior to Red Sea parting	Uncredited
1926	The Greater Glory	Mitzi von Berg	Lost film
