= Carrie Daumery =

American actress (1863–1938)

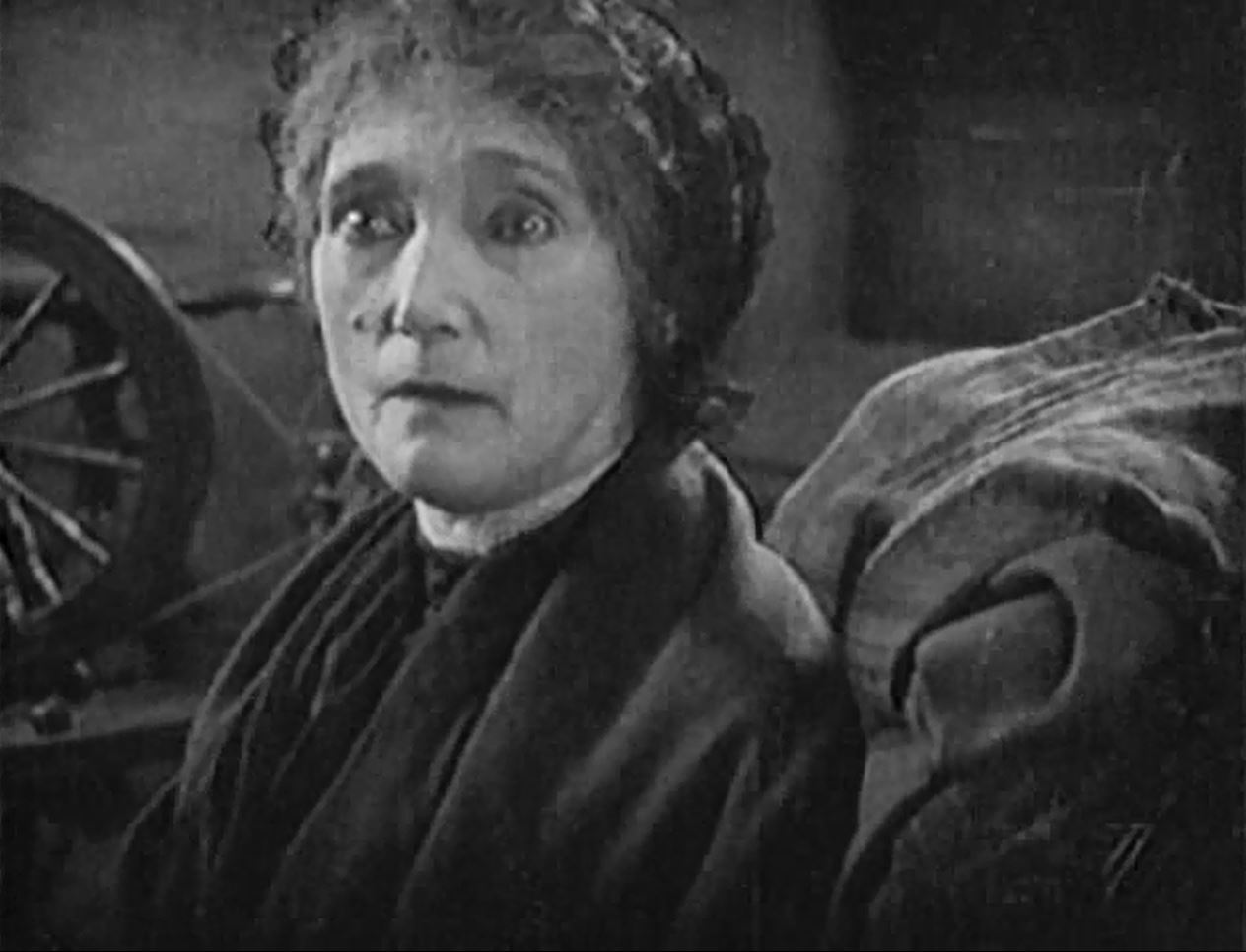
- Daumery in The Conquering Power (1921)
- Born: 25 March 1863; Brussels, Belgium
- Died: 1 July 1938 (aged 75); Los Angeles, California, U.S.
- Occupation: Actress
- Years active: 1908-1937

Carrie Daumery (25 March 1863 – 1 July 1938) was a Belgian-born American film actress. She appeared in more than 60 films between 1908 and 1937.

== Personal life ==
Daumery was the sister in law of violinist Eugène Ysaÿe. She was also the widow of Belgian pianist Theo Ysaye and the mother of film director John Daumery.

Daumery and her husband were traveling in Switzerland when World War I began; when they returned to Belgium, they discovered German soldiers occupying their home. Subsequently, their son fought in the war, and her husband's health failed. When the war ended, Daumery's husband was dead, and her son was recovering from poison gas and wounds. Daumery died in Los Angeles, California.

== Career ==
Daumery began acting on stage at age 17 in roles that she described to a reporter as "artistic". Later she went to Hollywood, where she became "one of the best-known extras in the screen colony". She eventually progressed from being an extra to work as a stock actress at Warner Brothers studio.

== Partial filmography ==
- The Conquering Power (1921)
- The Song of Love (1923) (uncredited)
- Dorothy Vernon of Haddon Hall (1924)
- He Who Gets Slapped (1924)
- Dynamite Dan (1924)
- Forbidden Paradise (1924)
- The Rose of Paris (1924)
- I'll Show You the Town (1925)
- Lady Windermere's Fan (1925)
- The Unholy Three (1925)
- Paris at Midnight (1926)
- The Lucky Lady (1926)
- The Greater Glory (1926)
- The Love Thief (1926)
- Young April (1926)
- The Garden of Eden (1928)
- The Cardboard Lover (1928)
- The Man Who Laughs (1928)
- Hearts in Exile (1929)
- The Kiss (1929)
- Madame X (1929)
- General Crack (1929)
- Children of Pleasure (1930)
- Cameo Kirby (1930)
- Call of the Flesh (1930) and French language version Le chanteur de Séville
- The Common Law (1931)
- The Road to Singapore (1931) (uncredited)
- Ambassador Bill (1931) (uncredited)
- Duck Soup (1933) as Reception Guest (uncredited)
- Queen Christina (1933) as Woman at Court (uncredited)
- Grand Canary (1934)
- Strange Wives (1934)
- Anna Karenina (1935)
- Give Me Liberty (1936)
