= Thundering Hoofs (1922 film) =

1922 film

- Directed by: Francis Ford
- Starring: Francis Ford; Peggy O'Day; James T. Kelley
- Cinematography: O.G. Hill
- Production company: New Era Productions
- Distributed by: Anchor Film Distributors
- Release date: October 1, 1922
- Running time: 50 minutes
- Country: United States
- Languages: Silent; English intertitles

Thundering Hoofs is a 1922 American silent drama film directed by Francis Ford and starring Ford, Peggy O'Day and James T. Kelley. Made as an independent, it was directed by Francis Ford who was the elder brother of the better-known John Ford. Copies of the film still survive, unlike many independent productions of the era.

== Plot ==
After years at a boarding school, a young woman returns to Kentucky. She arrives just in time to stop a racehorse she owns from being scratched from the Kentucky Derby.

== Cast ==
- Peggy O'Day as Betty
- Francis Ford as Daddy Bill/'Colonel' Bill
- James T. Kelley as Jimmy O'Brien
- Florence Murth as Bill's Sister
- Philip Ford as Jack - Bill's Nephew
- Cecil McLean as Jack's Sweetheart - Betty's Chum

== Bibliography ==
- Munden, Kenneth White. The American Film Institute Catalog of Motion Pictures Produced in the United States, Part 1. University of California Press, 1997.
