= Missing Daughters (1924 film) =

1924 film

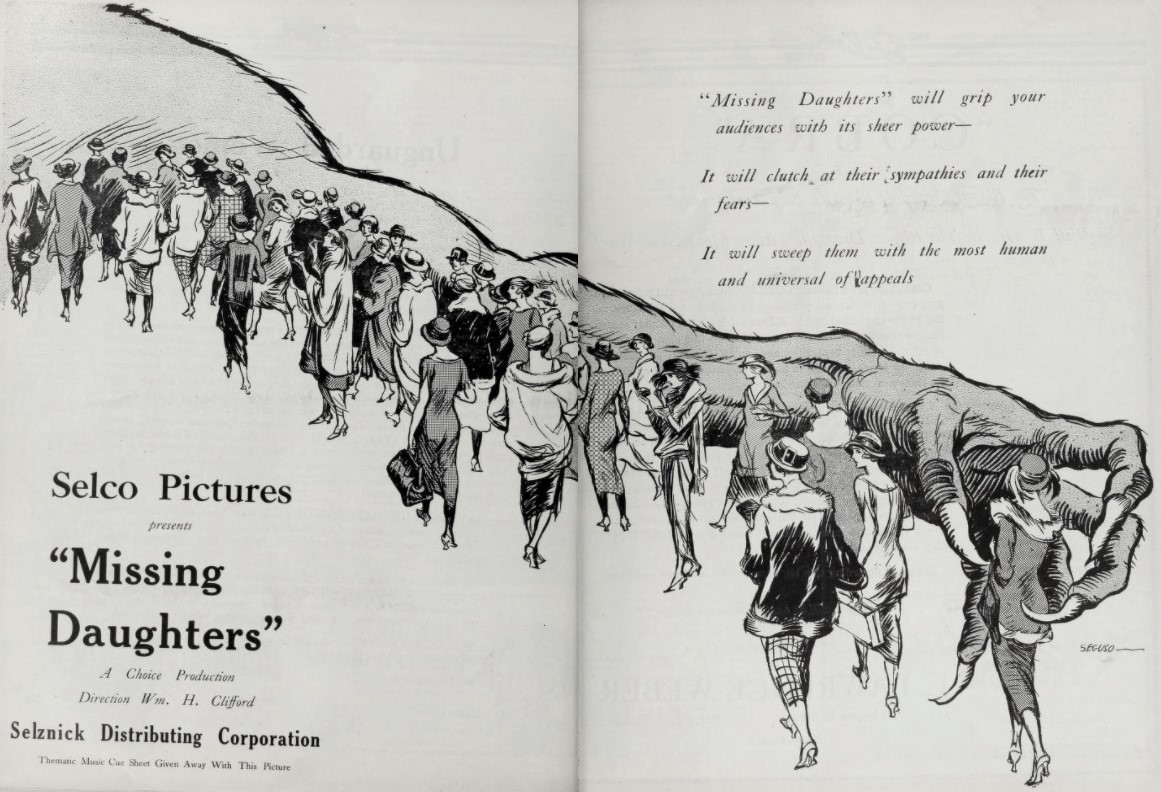
- Directed by: William H. Clifford
- Written by: William H. Clifford
- Starring: Eileen Percy; Pauline Starke; Claire Adams
- Cinematography: Ray June
- Production company: Choice Productions
- Distributed by: Selznick Pictures
- Release date: May 25, 1924
- Running time: 60 minutes
- Country: United States
- Languages: Silent; English intertitles

Missing Daughters is a 1924 American silent crime drama film directed by William H. Clifford and starring Eileen Percy, Pauline Starke and Claire Adams.

== Cast ==
- Eileen Percy as Eileen Allen
- Pauline Starke as Pauine Hinton
- Claire Adams as Claire Mathers
- Eva Novak as Eva Rivers
- Walter Long as Guy Benson
- Robert Edeson as Chief of Secret Service
- Rockliffe Fellowes as John Rogers
- Sheldon Lewis as Tony Hawks
- Walt Whitman as The Beachcombeer
- Frank Ridge as Frank Linke
- Chester Bishop as Anthony Roche

== Bibliography ==
- Connelly, Robert B. The Silents: Silent Feature Films, 1910-36, Volume 40, Issue 2. December Press, 1998.
- Munden, Kenneth White. The American Film Institute Catalog of Motion Pictures Produced in the United States, Part 1. University of California Press, 1997.
