= Edith O'Shaughnessy =

American writer

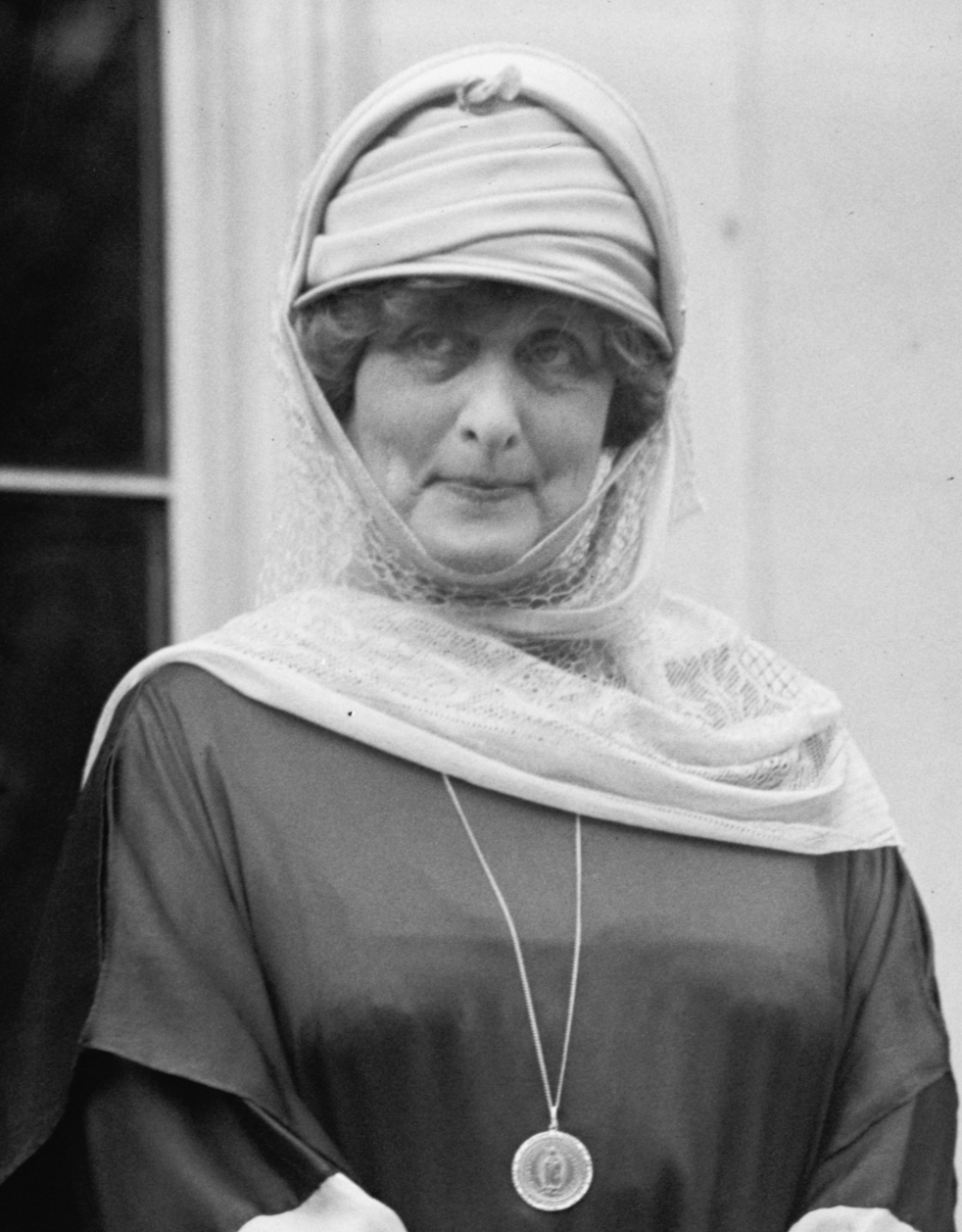
Edith O'Shaughnessy on May 8, 1923

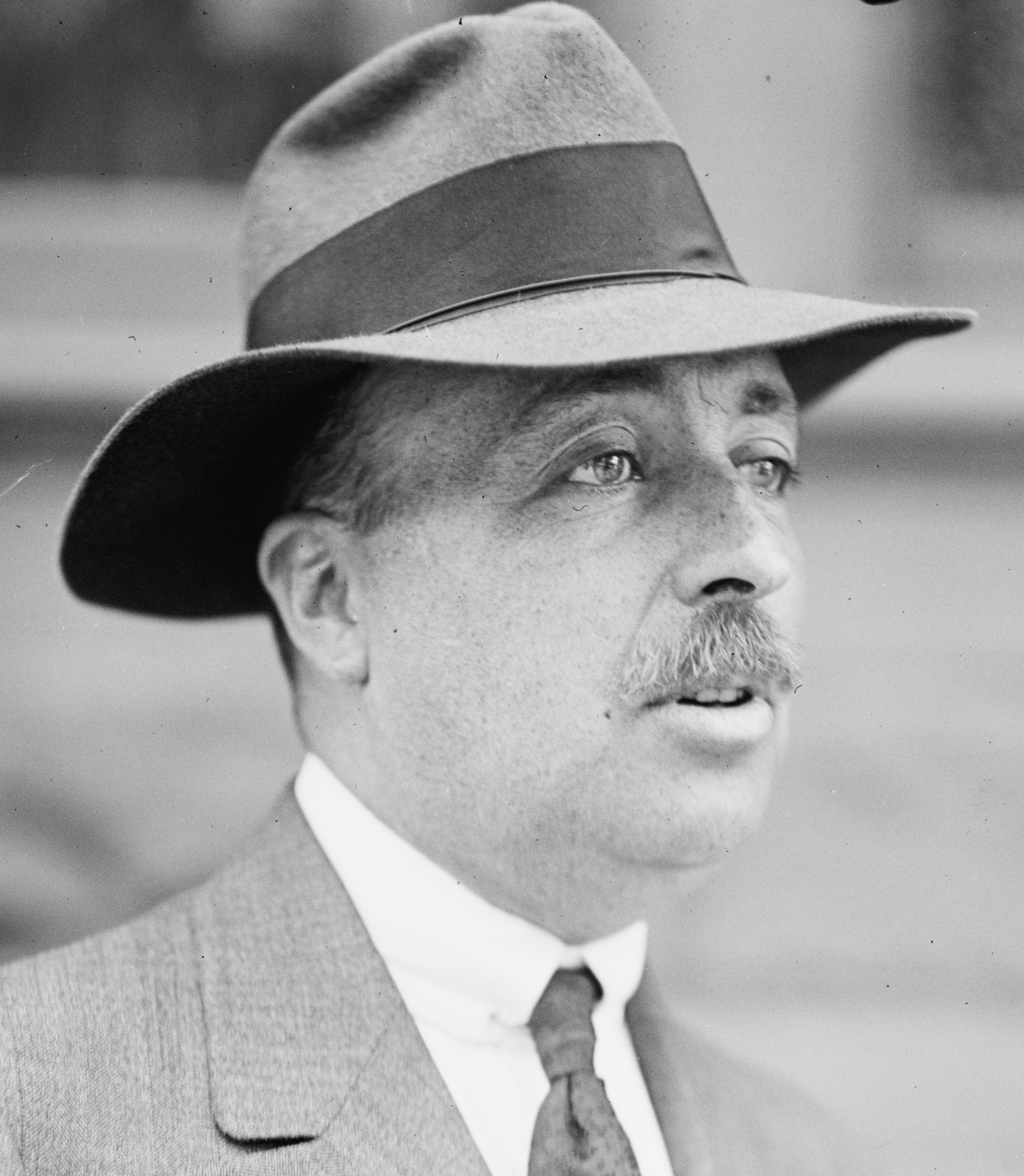
Her husband Nelson O'Shaughnessy in 1914

Edith Louise O'Shaughnessy (née Coues; January 31, 1868 – February 18, 1939) was a journalist, biographer, film screenwriter and, as the wife of United States Chargé d’Affaires in Mexico, Nelson O'Shaughnessy, during the early years of the Mexican Revolution she was both a witness and a participant in Mexican political affairs during the presidency of Francisco I. Madero and Victoriano Huerta.

== Biography ==
She was born Edith Louise Coues on January 31, 1868, in Columbia, South Carolina. Her parents were noted ornithologist Elliott Coues (1842-1899) and Jane 'Jeannie' Augusta McKinney (also spelled McKenney in some sources) (1845-1925). She was the eldest of five children, but only Edith and two brothers survived into adulthood. Her brothers were Elliott Baird Coues (January 19, 1872, in Baltimore, Maryland – January 2, 1913, in Zurich, Switzerland) and Beverley Drinkard Coues (born November, 1878, in Washington, D.C.). Her parents' marriage was a difficult one, due in part to her father's frequent absences on scientific and ornithological research trips and his womanizing. Her parents separated in 1880, and finally divorced in 1886. Edith, eighteen, and Beverley, eight, remained with their mother in Washington, D.C., while fourteen-year-old Elliott lived with his father.

She was educated by private tutors and attended the Institute of Notre Dame

After her convent education she was sent to Europe both for the experience, and in the hope of finding a suitable husband. She married Oxford-educated diplomat and lawyer Nelson O’Shaughnessy in 1901. From 1901 to 1915, Edith O’Shaughnessy was a diplomatic wife, serving her country (and tea) as a proper diplomatic hostess in Copenhagen, Berlin, St. Petersburg, Vienna, Bucharest, Mexico, and Rio de Janeiro. Her fame as a writer rests on her experiences in Mexico City during the Madero and Huerta Presidencies.

During Nelson O'Shaughnessy's diplomatic service in Mexico (1911–1914). Edith wrote A Diplomat's Wife in Mexico (1916) and Diplomatic Days (1917). Both consist of a series of letters written to the author's mother. Diplomatic Days covers the fall of the long regime headed by Porfirio Diaz and the revolution which brought the "democratic" government of Francisco Madero to power. A Diplomat's Wife in Mexico covers events in 1913 and 1914, when Madero was overthrown in a violent coup (the "Ten Tragic Days") by Victoriano Huerta on February 13, 1913, and murdered by the new regime.

In A Diplomat's Wife, O’Shaughnessy has no illusions about Huerta's alcoholism and bloody-mindedness, sometimes displaying a condescending attitude based mostly on the racial background of the indigenous Huerta. However, she defends him as "a necessarily iron-fisted leader, doing his best to control an unruly populace."

A third book, Intimate Pages of Mexican History, a "Social Life in Mexico City Since the Brief and Tragic Glory of Maximilian and Carlota" was published in 1920.

Because of their too close personal relationship with Huerta, the O'Shaughnessys fled Mexico City with the fall of the dictator in July 1914. Nelson O'Shaughnessy was later posted to several embassies in Europe, providing Edith with material for travel books on northern France. She also wrote a biography of Marie-Adélaïde, the Grand Duchess of Luxembourg, and a novel, Viennese Medley, later made into a film The Greater Glory, which tells the story of former aristocrats in Vienna after the end of the First World War and the dissolution of the Austro-Hungarian Empire.

O'Shaughnessy also contributed articles to many periodicals, including Harper's Magazine and Review of Reviews.

She was a close personal friend of the detective fiction author, Anna Katherine Green (1846-1935). Edith's mother, Jeannie, had met Green when the two women attended university together at Ripley Female College in Poultney, Vermont in the 1860s. Edith and Green maintained a long-standing and affectionate correspondence.

She died on February 18, 1939, in New York City.
