= Rose Briar =

1922 play by Booth Tarkington

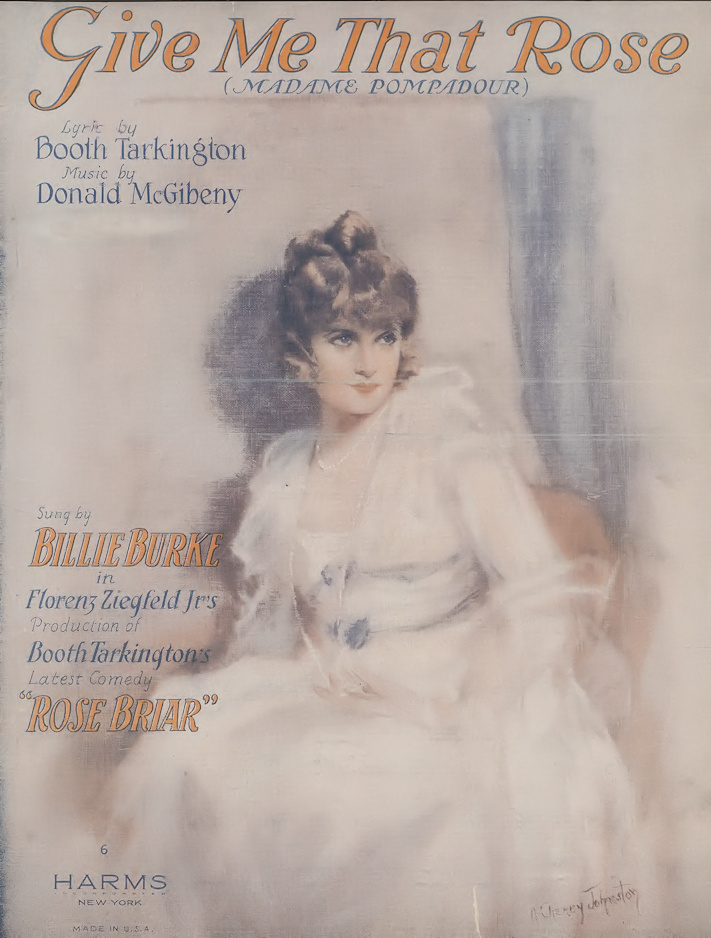
- Original language: English
- Written by: Booth Tarkington
- Music by: Victor Herbert, Jerome Kern, Donald McGibney
- Lyrics by: Booth Tarkington
- Subject: Romance and reconciliation
- Genre: Comedy
- Setting: A caberet and the drawing room of Mrs. Valentine's house.

Premiere
- Date: December 25, 1922
- Place: Empire Theatre
- Directed by: Florenz Ziegfeld

Rose Briar is a 1922 play by Booth Tarkington. It is a three-act comedy with two settings and eleven characters. The story concerns a caberet singer who resists a society woman's efforts to lure her into becoming the other woman in a divorce. The title comes from the name of the main character. The play was commissioned from Tarkington by Florenz Ziegfeld, as a vehicle for his wife Billie Burke.

The play was produced and staged by Florenz Ziegfeld, with sets by Joseph Urban, incidental music by Victor Herbert, and one song each by Jerome Kern and Donald McGibeny, both with Tarkington lyrics. It starred Billie Burke, with Frank Conroy, Allan Dinehart, and Julia Hoyt in support. It had tryouts in Wilmington, Delaware, Atlantic City, Baltimore, Buffalo, and Pittsburgh starting in mid-November 1922, before it premiered on Broadway, Christmas Day 1922. It ran through early March 1923, with a common critical opinion being that the Act I caberet scene was more entertaining than the rest of the play.

Billie Burke decided to forgo a tour for Rose Briar. The play was never revived on Broadway, nor adapted for other media, though the original songs Love and the Moon (Kern/Tarkington) and Give Me That Rose (Madame Pompadour) (McGibeny/Tarkington) were released on sheet music and on a phonograph record.

== Characters ==
Characters are listed in order of appearance within their scope.

Lead

- Rose Briar is a woman of good family, who now must make a living as a caberet singer-pianist.

Supporting

- Paradee is a bachelor and former lover of Rose, friendly with Mrs. Valentine.
- Valentine is a married man, grown neurotic over his wife's coldness, and seems only interested in Rose.
- Mrs. Valentine is a very wealthy young woman, who uses "baby talk" with her friends. (Note: A reference to the character Lola Pratt in Tarkington's Seventeen.)

Featured

- Little is a shady attorney willing to go along with Mrs. Valentine's scheme to trigger a divorce.
- Crecelous is Rose's boss at the Restaurant Pompadour Caberet, who also acts as announcer for the performers.
- Miss Nicely is a dancer who performs solo as the opening act for the caberet.
- Miss Sheppard is a newspaper woman invited to the Valentine's home to witness any grounds for divorce.
- Monsieur Prologue is proprietor of the Restaurant Pompadeur Caberet. (Note: This character was added after the tryouts and before the Broadway premiere.)
- Sullivan (Note: This character was added between the Baltimore and Buffalo tryouts.)
- Thompson (Note: This character was added between the Baltimore and Buffalo tryouts.)

Bit Players

- Caberet patrons, orchestra, waiters

== Synopsis ==
The play was never published; this synopsis is compiled from contemporaneous newspaper and magazine reviews.

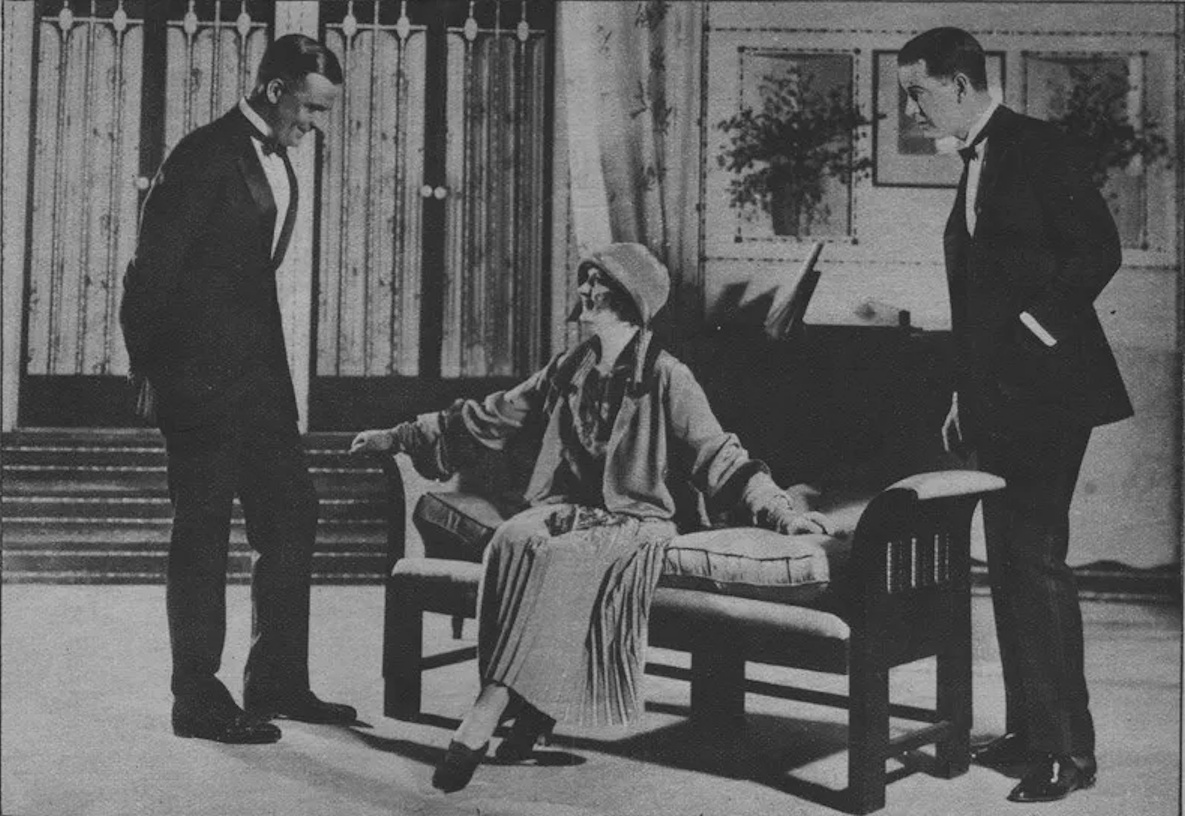

Act I (Interior of Restaurant Pompadeur Caberet, at night.) This is a high class establishment with socially prominent customers. The set shows a small orchestra and "stage on a stage", which consists of risers leading to a series of open archways with curtain screens. Patrons, waiters, and entertainers swirl about the floor between numbers. The Valentines are there, along with Paradee. He is attentive to Mrs. Valentine, who misunderstands his sympathetic manner for romantice interest. She ignores her husband, who displays nervous behavior indicating emotional upset. Miss Nicely performs an interesting solo dance to music. Both men are momentarily diverted, Valentine to the music and Paradee to the girl. Later, Rose Briar appears on the risers in ornate Court of Versailles costume, singing Give Me That Rose (Madame Pompadour), and Valentine perks up. She returns in a simpler outfit to sing Love and the Moon, and Valentine is noticeably affected. Mrs. Valentine gets an idea; she summons her lawyer Mr. Little, and he, with the caberet managers, tell Rose she must go to Mrs. Valentine's country home that weekend if she wants to keep her job. (Curtain)

Act II (Drawing room of Mrs. Valentine's home, the next weekend afternoon.) Rose now learns from Mr. Little what is expected of her: to lure Mr. Valentine into a compromising situation, so Mrs. Valentine can obtain a divorce. The reporter Miss Sheppard and Crecelous are present to testify to any unseemly behavior. At first Rose goes along with it; Valentine means nothing to her and she needs her job. But with time she conceives a dislike for Mrs. Valentine. She also realizes that Paradee isn't really interested in Mrs. Valentine, while Mr. Valentine's neurotic behavior is all due to Mrs. Valentine's coldness to him. Rose decides to compete with Mrs. Valentine for Paradee. (Curtain)

Act III (Same as Act II, that evening.) Paradee now becomes the target of two battling women. Rose makes fun of Mrs. Valentine's proclivity for baby talk and incessant claims of persecution, but also helps clear up her mistaken impression of Mr. Valentine's infidelity. Eventually Paradee falls for his former love Rose, and Mrs. Valentine reconciles with her husband. (Curtain)

== Original production ==
=== Background ===
Booth Tarkington wrote the play for Billie Burke at the behest of her showman husband, Florenz Ziegfeld. The year previous, she had starred in Tarkington's The Intimate Strangers, originally written for Maude Adams, but reworked for Burke when the former stayed in retirement. Ziegfeld felt that a play written especially for Burke would have more success than The Intimate Strangers.

The first public notice of the new play came in August 1922, while Burke and Ziegfeld were at their summer home in York Harbor, Maine. Tarkington, who spent summers in nearby Kennebunkport, had brought the play over for Burke to read. It was still a work in progress, for it wasn't yet ready for rehearsal. Casting extended into late September and early October, when Frank Conroy and Julia Hoyt were signed. Tarkington had come down from Kennebunkport to Manhattan for the casting. Allan Dinehart was cast for the leading man, while others signed included Florence O'Denishawn and Ethel Remey. Rehearsals had begun by mid-October.

By early November it was announced Victor Herbert was writing incidental music for the play.

=== Cast ===
Cast during the tryouts and the Broadway run.
Role	Actor	Dates	Notes and sources
Rose Briar	Billie Burke	Nov 16, 1922 - Mar 10, 1923	
Mr. Paradee	Allan Dinehart	Nov 16, 1922 - Mar 10, 1923	
Mr. Valentine	Frank Conroy	Nov 16, 1922 - Mar 10, 1923	
Mrs. Valentine	Julia Hoyt	Nov 16, 1922 - Mar 10, 1923	Annoyed at newspapers calling her Mrs. Lydig Hoyt, she insisted on being billed as Julia Hoyt.
Mr. Little	Richie Ling	Nov 16, 1922 - Mar 10, 1923	
M. Crecelous	Paul Doucet	Nov 16, 1922 - Mar 10, 1923	
Miss Nicely	Florence O'Denishawn	Nov 16, 1922 - Mar 10, 1923	
Miss Sheppard	Ethel Remey	Nov 16, 1922 - Mar 10, 1923	Remey and Frank McCoy, who played Thompson, were rumored to have been married. (Note: They were both former members of the Forrest Winant Company. During the show's run, a message was sent backstage by a woman who had heard the rumor, and so addressed her note to "Mrs. Frank McCoy". It was delivered to McCoy instead, who realized that it was meant for Ethel Remey.)
Monsieur Prologue	Donald Hall (Note: A few cast lists mention a Louis Darclee playing this role.)	Dec 25, 1922 - Mar 10, 1923	
Sullivan	Mark Haight	Dec 04, 1922 - Mar 10, 1923	
Thompson	Frank McCoy (Note: A few cast lists mention a John White playing this role.)	Dec 04, 1922 - Mar 10, 1923	McCoy was a former member of the Forrest Winant Players; besides acting, he did stage management.

=== Tryouts ===
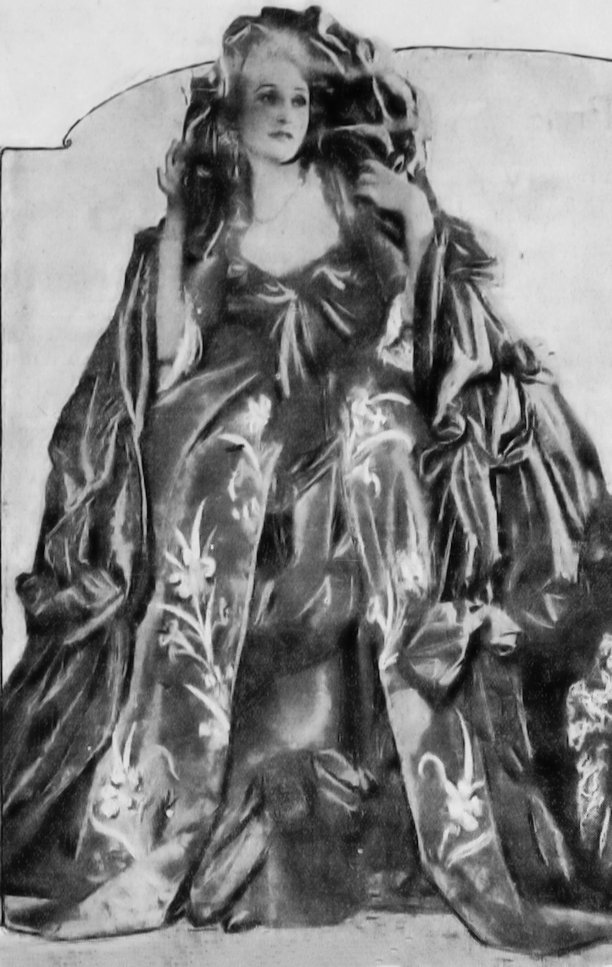
Billie Burke

Rose Briar was first performed at the Playhouse Theatre in Wilmington, Delaware on November 16, 1922. The Evening Journal reviewer reported that the play had only eight characters, with most lines falling to just four of them. They gave a cast list and the settings for each act, and identified the incidental music and that for Florence O'Denishawn's dance as composed by Victor Herbert. The four main actors, Billie Burke, Frank Conroy, Allan Dinehart, and Julia Hoyt were praised for their efforts, and the staging, especially of the first act, was considered very pleasing.

After three nights in Wilmington, the production moved to Nixon's Apollo Theatre in Atlantic City, starting November 20, 1922. Here the local reviewer said Frank Conroy gave "the best work of the entire performance, as the cowed yet adoring speciman of the useless husband of a rich wife. Mrs. Lydig Hoyt is not so effective as Mrs. Valentine", while Allan Dinehart was considered "far too good for" the part of Paradee. Following Atlantic City, the play was presented at Ford's Theatre in Baltimore, starting November 27, 1922. It received a scathing review from a critic at The Evening Sun, who said the theme "is treated in so unreal and preposterous a way (the character delineation is so farcical and so patent a caricature of life) that the piece immediately degenerates into one of those curious exhibitions of bad manners that Mr. Tarkington seems to delight in...".

The play then opened at the Majestic Theatre in Buffalo on December 4, 1922. The reviewer for The Buffalo News said both Florenz Ziegfeld and Booth Tarkington would be "doctoring" the play while in town. They provided a cast list that for the first time shows the characters Sullivan and Thompson, and identified Joseph Urban as the set designer. From Buffalo, Rose Briar went to Pittsburgh, where it opened at the Nixon Theater on December 11, 1922. The reviewer for The Gazette Times said the play was "not so happy a combination" between Burke and Tarkington as The Intimate Strangers, though it did please the audience.

=== Broadway premiere and reception ===
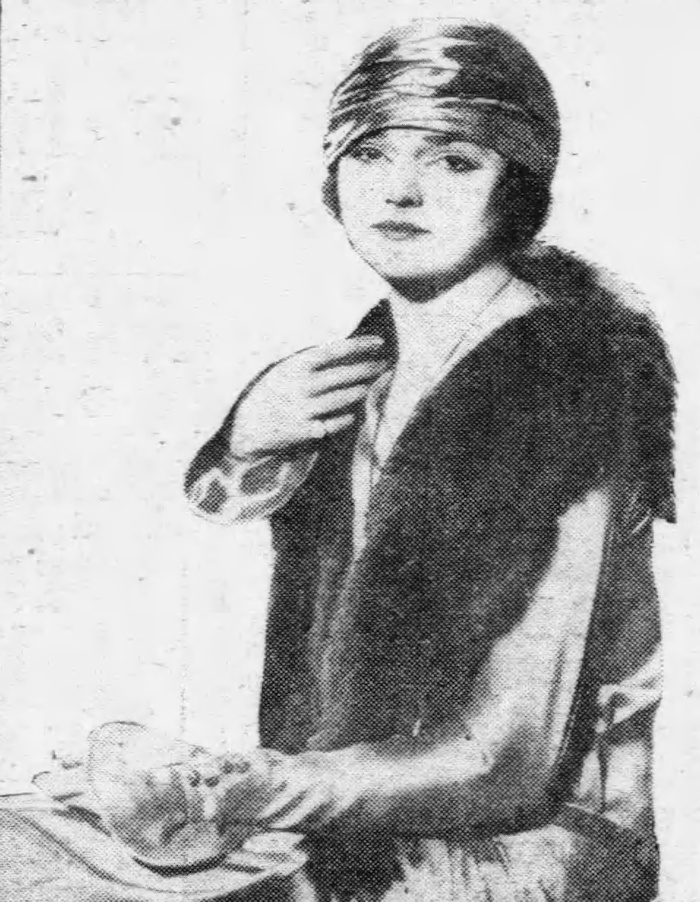
Julia Hoyt

Some of the negative reviews about the production led to Ziegfeld inviting critic Burns Mantle to view a dress rehearsal before the Broadway premiere on December 25, 1922, at the Empire Theatre. The cast list accompanying Mantle's review showed "Monsieur Prologue" for the first time, but he gave little in the way of a critical review. Alexander Woollcott said Rose Briar is a work "that is wise and gentle and buoyant and gay." He placed it next to Clarence among Tarkington's plays, but called the continuing story in the last two acts "the gradual subsidence of the play". He named both songs in the play and gave their composers, and said Burke "had not forgotten how to sing".

It was left to Percy Hammond in the New-York Tribune to spell out the dilemma critics face with reviewing Rose Briar. Acknowledging Tarkington's accomplishments as novelist, and that no author can expect to master all forms of writing, he confesses the urge to pull his punches when reviewing Rose Briar. Tarkington, Burke, Ziegfeld and the audience all think it good, "so who am I to say it is otherwise?" Hammond "suspects the play to be thin, awkward, and strained", but demurs judgement in the face of popular approval.

=== Broadway closing ===
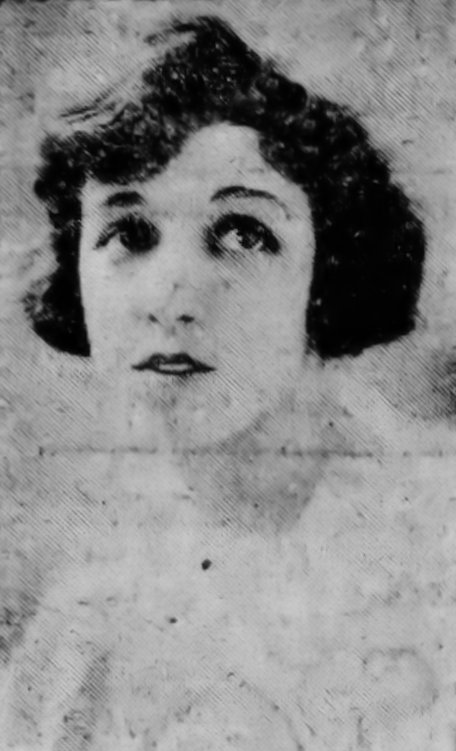
Ethel Remey

The play closed at the Empire Theatre on March 10, 1923. There had previously been reports of a tour, but Billie Burke made the decision to shut down the production. She was tired, newspapers reported, and wanted to join her convalescing husband in Palm Beach, Florida. The play was released for stock performances by May 1923.

=== Songs ===
Brunswick Records released a phonograph record (Brunswick 2402) in Canada during April 1923, with two instrumental dance numbers on it from Rose Briar: Love and the Moon and Give Me That Rose. Love and the Moon, by Jerome Kern and Booth Tarkington, was also performed by live musicians. Both songs may be heard performed by cover artists on YouTube today.
