= Ethel Remey =

American actress

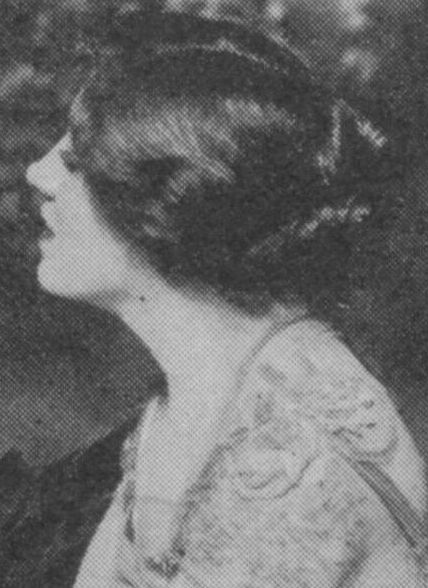
- Ethel Remey circa 1917 in the play Turn to the Right
- Born: February 22, 1895; New York City, New York
- Died: February 28, 1979 (aged 84); Neptune, New Jersey
- Occupation: Actress

Ethel Remey (February 22, 1895 - February 28, 1979 ) was an American actress. She was sometimes credited as Ethel Everett. On stage, Remey was with the Forrest Winant Players in New Brunswick, New Jersey, during the early 1920s. She appeared on Broadway with Billie Burke in Booth Tarkington's Rose Briar (1922).

Her most famous role was her portrayal of Alma Miller, mother of Lisa Miller (Eileen Fulton) on the soap opera As the World Turns. She played the role from 1963 to 1977.
