= Turn to the Right (play) =

1916 play by Winchell Smith and John E. Hazzard

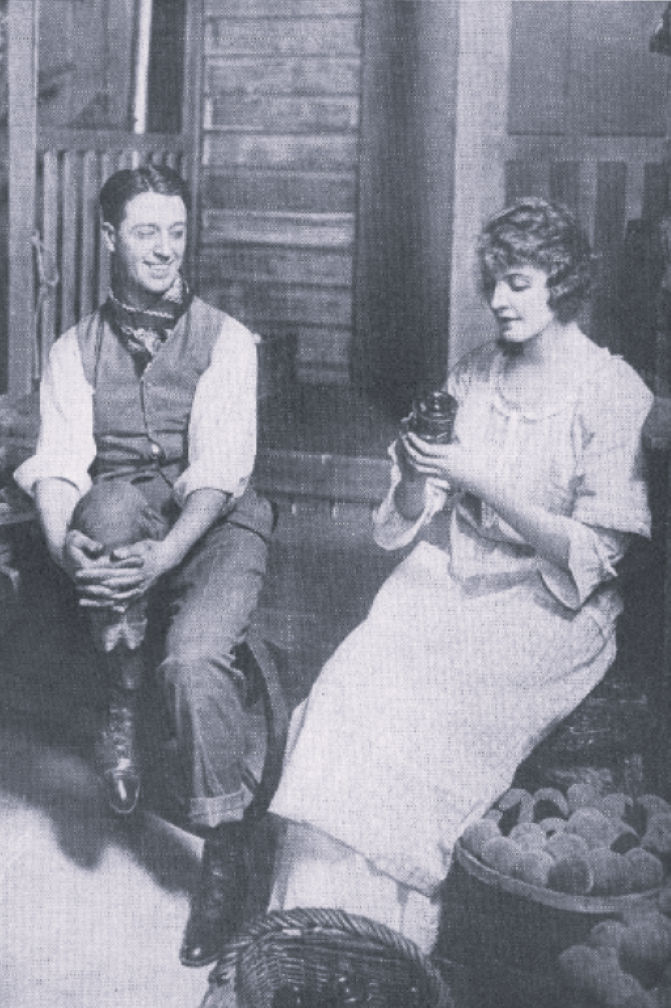
- William E. Meehan and Lucy Cotton
- Original title: Like Mother Made
- Original language: English
- Written by: Winchell Smith and John E. Hazzard
- First publication: 1916
- Subject: Redemption through maternal piety
- Genre: Comedy
- Setting: Pawn shop in Ossining, New York and a small farm in southwest Connecticut.

Premiere
- Date: August 17, 1916
- Place: Gaiety Theatre
- Directed by: Winchell Smith
- Original run: 443 performances

Turn to the Right is a 1916 play by Winchell Smith and John E. Hazzard, originally titled Like Mother Made. It is a comedy in a prologue and three acts, with three settings and fourteen speaking characters. The action of the play takes place over ten months time. The story concerns an unjustly convicted man who returns home to save his mother's farm and win back his old sweetheart.

The play was first produced by John Golden and Winchell Smith, the latter also staging it. Like Mother Made starred Forrest Winant and Louise Rutter. It had tryouts in Atlantic City during April 1916 and in Hartford, Connecticut during May 1916. Further production was scheduled for August 1916, by which time the play was retitled. Turn to the Right had brief tryouts in Long Branch and Asbury Park, New Jersey during August 1916. It premiered on Broadway that same month, where it ran through August 1917, for 443 performances.

Turn to the Right was novelized in 1917, and adapted for a 1922 silent film of the same name.

== Characters ==
Characters are listed in order of appearance within their scope.

Lead

- Joe Bascomb is 26, a tall, thin handsome man, who used the alias Peter Turner while in New York.
- Muggs is 27, a dip (pickpocket), smiling, quick-talking, a pal of Joe and Gilly from prison. (Note: In Act I, his real name is mentioned to be Lucius McCarthy, while in Act II the detective Callahan refers to him as "Slippery Muggs".)
- Gilly is 30, a yegg, a bit gruff but a good friend, another pal of Joe from prison. (Note: During Act I, his real name is mentioned to be Dudley Gilbert, while in Act II the detective Callahan calls him "Dynamite Gilly".)

Supporting

- Betty Bascom is 17, Joe's sister, neat but with older clothing.
- Mrs. Bascomb is 60, a sweet-faced, frail-looking little woman of saintly ways.
- Sam Martin is 18, a full-faced country boy, gossipy but an avid salesman.
- Elsie Tillinger is 20, a pretty blonde with a good sense of fashion.
- Deacon Tillinger is 58, Elsie's father; large, shrewd, tightfisted and shifty, who owns the local grocery.

Featured

- Isadore is 60, a Yiddish-speaking Polish Jew, owner of a pawn shop in Ossining, New York. (Note: He also provides cheap accommodation for guests.)
- Jessie Strong is 25, a pretty red head, who has a slight lisp, friend to Betty and Elsie.
- Lester Morgan is 26, dark and handsome, with good manners and breeding, a real snake.
- Tom Callahan is 45, a solidly built detective of affable nature.

Bit player

- Moses is an elderly Polish Jew, a monolingual Yiddish-speaking tailor who works for Isadore. (Note: Cast lists identify this character as portrayed by George Spelvin, a stage name that Winchell Smith insisted be part of every production in which he took part since its first use in Brewster's Millions.)
- Katie is a young uniformed maid who appears briefly in Act III.

== Synopsis ==
Prologue (In Isadore's Pawn Shop. July morning, 6 am.) Joe Bascomb, just released after a year in Sing-Sing, stops by the pawn shop to meet up with his pals Muggs and Gilly, and to exchange his prison-provided suit for a more fashionable second-hand one. While Moses works on altering the suit, Isadore rouses his two overnight guests and cooks some breakfast for them. Muggs and Gilly, who have been out longer, try to get Joe to come in with them on a caper, to get some working capital before going straight. But Joe, though he thinks the world of his pals, is adamant about staying clean. He is walking home to southwest Connecticut from Ossining, a long day's hike. (Curtain)

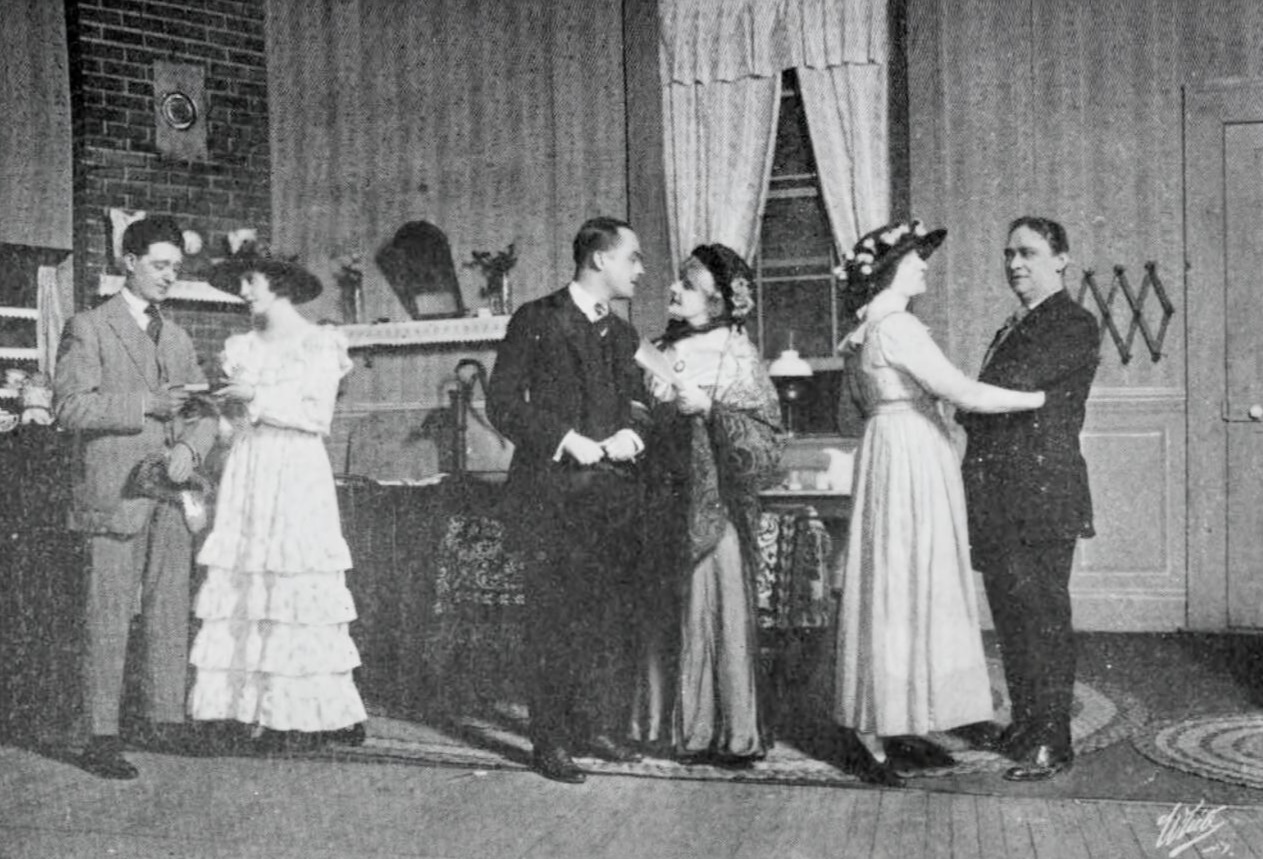

Act I (In Mrs. Bascomb's Kitchen. Same day, 5:45 pm.) Jessie Strong helps Betty Bascomb wash dishes; the Bascombs are losing the farm to the Deacon. Mrs. Bascomb stills their anxiety with her sweet charm. She tells Sam Martin to leave the preserve jars on the porch as she tends the woodshed stove. The girls ignore Sam, until he mentions Lester Morgan is in the village courting Elsie Tillinger, with Deacon Tillinger's approval. Mrs. Bascomb brings some filled preserve jars for Sam to take back to the Deacon. Sam shocks them by implying the Deacon is cheating Mrs. Bascomb on the preserves selling price. Persuaded by Betty, Mrs. Bascomb agrees Sam may sell her preserves, but not in the village, to avoid offending the Deacon. Elated, Sam says he's quitting the Deacon's employ, while Mrs. Bascomb directs the girls in stewing up another batch. Mrs. Bascomb visits a sick neighbor. Deacon Tillinger comes in, sends off Jessie, and has Betty fetch her mother. Alone now, he invites Lester Morgan in to sample the preserves. The Deacon offers Lester a half share in the orchard, but Lester is broke and on the outs with his wealthy father. Lester wants to marry Elsie, but Deacon says he must reconcile with his father first. Later, Betty and Mrs. Bascomb are surprised at Joe's reappearance, after a year of no letters and no money sent home. Without his remittances, Mrs. Bascomb has fallen in debt to the Deacon for $125. Now Muggs and Gilly surprise Joe by showing up, having arrived by boxcar. Mrs. Bascomb feeds the three men from their meager supplies, impressing Muggs and Gilly with her sweet nature, while Betty and Muggs show mutual interest. Joe explains the family situation to his pals. Jessie is introduced; she and Gilly hit it off. Joe awaits Deacon Tillinger, while Betty and Jessie point out his store to Gilly and Muggs. When the Deacon arrives, he and Joe argue over the debt, but the Deacon is stymied when Joe presents him with the money for his mother's debt. Gilly had cracked Deacon's safe, withdrawn $125 and then passed it to Joe. As the flustered Deacon leaves, his pocket is picked by Muggs, who explains Gilly will restore the money to Deacon's safe. They then join the ladies for the evening's Chapel. (Curtain)

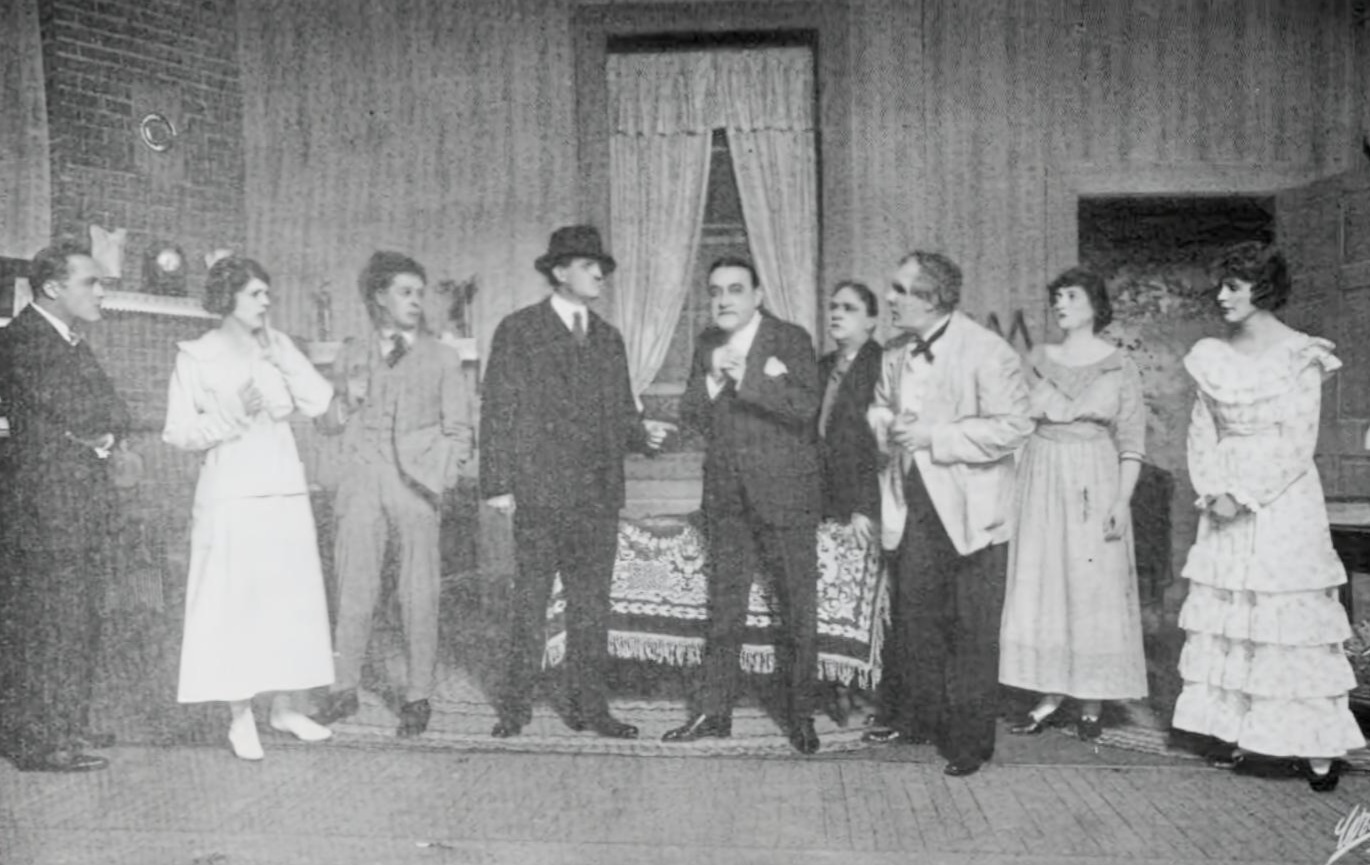

Act II (Outside Mrs. Bascomb's Kitchen. Next morning.) Exposition between Betty and Mrs. Bascomb reveals the Deacon has missed the money paid him. Muggs and Gilley are picking the peach crop, since they have offered to buy it the previous evening. Joe has borrowed a wagon from a neighbor and gone off. Jessie comes for two baskets of peaches, but runs to the orchard when Gilly falls out of a tree. Jessie and Betty take the peach baskets back to her house, while Mrs. Bascomb tends to a large bruise on Gilly's back. It is an epiphany for him, who was an orphan. He and Muggs are getting worried about disappointing the Bascombs, and hope Joe has found a buyer for the peaches. Betty returns, bringing Elsie, who is introduced to the boys then goes in to see Mrs. Bascomb. Joe returns, and is told by Betty that Elsie loves him. Mrs. Bascomb visits the butcher, and Elsie is alone with Joe at last. He tells her the truth, how he spent a year in Sing-Sing for a robbery he does not remember, and the shenanigans with the Deacon's $125. Elsie is dismayed at first, but rallies and rushes off with an idea to forestall her father's calling in the sheriff. Joe and the boys huddle, and figure out the only solution is to make peach preserves out of the crop, as no one wants the fruit itself. Their scheme is given a boost when Sam Martin reveals he has a buyer lined up in New York. Sam gives the trio $250 in exchange for a commission on sales of the jam then catches the train back to New York. Muggs and Gilly are nervous when Callahan shows up, but he is not looking for them. When Deacon Tillinger shows up with Lester Morgan, he is presented with the missing $125. Lester Morgan recognizes Joe as Peter Turner, who did time for robbing his father's steward, but Joe also remembers now it was Lester who got him drunk just before the robbery. Callahan surprises everyone by clapping handcuffs on Lester, whose own father has sworn a warrant out on him for theft and embezzlement. (Curtain)

Act III (Same as Act II. Ten months later, around 8:30 pm.) Katie serves coffee to everyone, the men dressed in evening clothes. There has been a dinner to celebrate Joe and Elsie returning from their honeymoon, with Sam Martin presiding over it. Muggs and Betty pair off, while Gilly and Jessie do likewise. The peach jam has been a success and they are all now comparatively well off. Joe, Muggs, and Gilly give credit to Mrs. Bascomb for the turnaround in all their fortunes. (Curtain)

== Original production ==
=== Background ===
The original idea for the play came from John E. Hazzard, a comic actor. John Golden and Winchell Smith encouraged him to write the play, which he spent four weeks doing at Smith's home in Farmington, Connecticut, without getting very far. Smith then took over the writing. The completed play was called Like Mother Made, referring to the preserves Mrs. Bascomb cooks up from her peach orchard fruit. The play was rehearsed at the Globe Theatre in Manhattan, using the same cast as would later appear on Broadway. It then played a one-week tryout at Nixon's Apollo Theatre in Atlantic City starting April 24, 1916. Like Mother Made had another week-long tryout at Parsons Theatre in Hartford, Connecticut, starting May 1, 1916.

As planned the production then went on hiatus until the following season. During July 1916, the producers announced the name had changed to Turn to the Right.

=== Cast ===
The cast from the Long Branch and Asbury Park tryouts through the Broadway run.
Role	Actor	Dates	Notes and sources
Joe Bascomb	Forrest Winant	Aug 07, 1916 - Aug 29, 1917	
Muggs	William E. Meehan	Aug 07, 1916 - Aug 29, 1917	Meehan died unexpectedly at age 35, on March 23, 1920, after a brief illness.
Gilly	Frank Nelson	Aug 07, 1916 - Aug 29, 1917	He should not be confused with the much younger Frank Nelson.
Betty Bascomb	Lucy Cotton	Aug 07, 1916 - Aug 29, 1917	
Mrs. Bascomb	Ruth Chester	Aug 07, 1916 - Aug 29, 1917	
Sam Martin	Edgar Nelson	Aug 07, 1916 - Aug 29, 1917	
Elsie Tillinger	Louise Rutter	Aug 07, 1916 - Aug 29, 1917	
Deacon Tillinger	Samuel Reed	Aug 07, 1916 - Aug 29, 1917	
Isedore	Al Sincoff	Aug 07, 1916 - Aug 29, 1917	
Jessie Strong	Alice Hastings	Aug 07, 1916 - Aug 29, 1917	
Lester Morgan	Roy Fairchild	Aug 07, 1916 - Aug 29, 1917	
Callahan	Harry Humphrey	Aug 07, 1916 - Aug 29, 1917	
Moses	Jacob Mandel	Aug 07, 1916 - Aug 29, 1917	Officially billed as George Spelvin, he was already 70 when hired for this production.
Katie	Justine Adams	Aug 07, 1916 - May ??, 1917	Adams left for a production called Dollars and Sense.
Katie	Margaret Boland	May ??, 1917 - Aug 29, 1917	Boland had served as female understudy for all roles before Adams left.

=== Tryouts ===
Turn to the Right had a three-day tryout at the Broadway theatre in Long Branch, New Jersey starting August 6, 1916, followed by another three-day tryout at the Savoy Theatre in Asbury Park, New Jersey, starting August 10, 1916.

=== Broadway premiere and reception ===
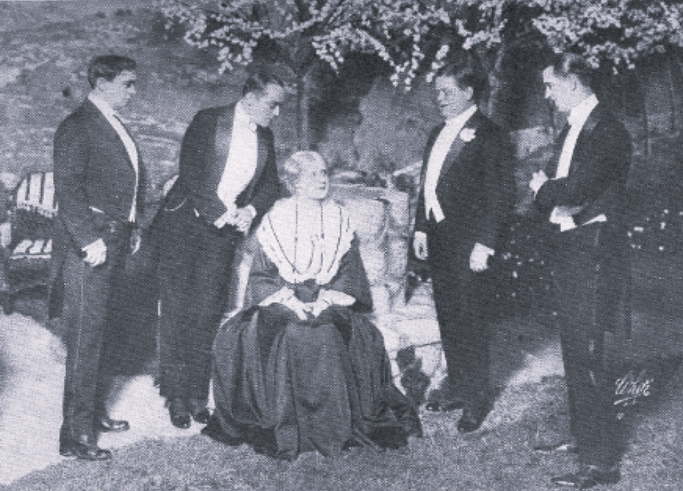

The production had its Broadway premiere at the Gaiety Theatre on August 17, 1916. Newspaper ads in Manhattan had an exclamation point after the title, which appears nowhere else in conjunction with the play. The reviewer for The Brooklyn Daily Eagle said the predominant theme was "mother-stuff" which the normally sophisticated Broadway first-night crowd embraced enthusiastically. Heywood Broun said William E. Meehan carried the comedic acting honors, while Forrest Winant was limited by a role devoted to sentiment. Broun also praised the performances of Frank Nelson, Ruth Chester, and Edgar Nelson. The New York Times critic thought some players needed to be more "firmly handled" to avoid obvious "scoring and underscoring" of dialogue as if it were a vaudeville act, but thought all were adequate to their roles except Roy Fairchild.

=== Broadway closing ===
Turn to the Right closed at the Gaiety Theatre on Wednesday, August 29, 1917, after 443 performances.

== Adaptations ==
=== Literary ===
- Turn to the Right (1917) - A novelization of the play by Bennet Musson, published by Duffield & Co.

=== Film ===
- Turn to the Right (1922) - A Metro Pictures silent-film adaptation by June Mathis and Mary O'Hara, produced by John Golden and Marcus Loew, directed by Rex Ingram, and starring Jack Mulhall, Alice Terry, Harry Myers, and George Cooper.

== Bibliography ==
- Winchell Smith and John E. Hazzard. Turn to the Right: A Comedy in a Prologue and Three Acts. Samuel French, 1916
