= An Affair of Three Nations =

1915 film by Ashley Miller

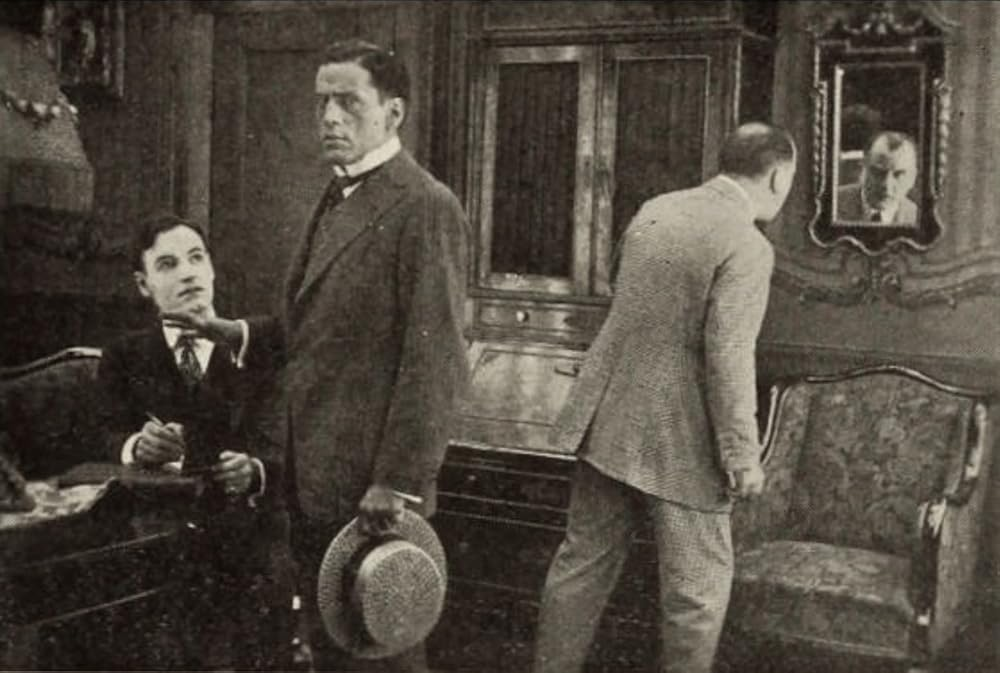
- Film still
- Directed by: Arnold Daly; Ashley Miller
- Based on: Story by; John T. McIntyre
- Starring: Arnold Daly; Sheldon Lewis; William Harrigan
- Production company: Pathé Frères Films
- Distributed by: Pathé Exchange, Inc.
- Release date: October 22, 1915
- Running time: 5 reels
- Country: United States
- Languages: Silent; (Black and White)

An Affair of Three Nations is a lost 1915 American silent mystery film directed by Arnold Daly and Ashley Miller, and produced by Pathé Frères Films. It is based on a story by John T. McIntyre. The film was the first in the "Ashton-Kirk, Investigator" series, and was followed by The Menace of the Mute. It stars Arnold Daly, Sheldon Lewis, William Harrigan, Charles Laite, Charles Krauss, George Melville and Louise Rutter.

== Plot ==
Ashton Kirk is a wealthy and scholarly young man who solves mysteries that have the police puzzled. Kirk is asked by Stella Morse, to find out who is threatening her uncle, Dr. Morse. Morse has a copy of a secret treaty between Russia and the United States that was made during the Russo-Japanese War. Following the murder of the Doctor, Kirk takes on the case to help solve it. The Japanese spy system has been trying to get hold of the treaty, which could ruin relations between its country and America. Kirk manages to get the treaty himself and prevents a war from breaking out.

== Cast ==
- Arnold Daly as Ashton Kirk
- Sheldon Lewis as Doctor Morse
- William Harrigan as Phillip Warwick
- Charles Laite as Pendleton
- Charles Krauss as Count Drevenoff
- Geoffrey Stein as Okin
- Martin Sabine as Karowski
- George Melville as Humadi
- Louise Rutter as Stella Morse
- Doris Mitchell as Nanon

== Contemporary reviews ==
Harvey F. Thew wrote in the Motion Picture News that "the characters in this picture are all finely drawn, and exceptionally convincing, considering that three nationalities are represented. The air of mystery is preserved throughout, leading up to a climax in the unraveling of the murder; and the plot, which commenced with a secret treaty between the United States and Russia, stolen long ago on a battlefield of the Russian-Japanese war, is rationally carried out to the end, despite a tendency toward heroics".

The Moving Picture World wrote "the cast is remarkably well balanced and the story holds the interest from start to finish. The atmosphere of mystery and suspense is very well sustained and the production is a sumptuous one. Altogether the film may be well termed a picture of unusual merit. Mr. Daly plays the part of "Ashton-Kirk, Investigator," and he is ably supported by Sheldon Lewis, Louise Rutter, Doris Mitchell, Charles Laite, Martin Sabine and William Harrigan".

In another review from The Moving Picture World, Margaret MacDonald wrote the film is a "highly colored melodrama produced in the best style of the screen is this thrilling adventure of Ashton-Kirk, Investigator. The story of John T. Mclntyre is essentially a mystery story from first to last. It is apparently not intended that we should at once share in the secret of the screen, but that we should remain in breathless suspense until the last card is played. The public will not be disappointed in the movie. The story of the effort of the son of Count Drevenoff to gain possession of a copy of a treaty of the Russian Government with the United States, which had been taken from his father at the time of his death, is mysterious, thrilling and artistic. If one may go so far as to predict its future we would say that as a box office attraction there can be no question of its success".

Thomas Kennedy wrote in Motography that the film is "uncommonly interesting and admirably acted, the film is a worthy addition to the formidable group of Gold Rooster plays. It is a mystery story giving to the producers and a cast of well known players many occasions for good dramatic effect. The element of mystery is maintained to the closing scenes, but from the beginning there are enough developments to hold the attention. In this respect the film has an advantage over the average detective photoplay. All the developments are not crowded into the last two reels. The direction of Arnold Daly and Ashley Miller is highly satisfactory".

== Preservation ==
With no holdings located in archives, An Affair of Three Nations is considered a lost film.

== See also ==
- The Menace of the Mute (1915)
- The House of Fear (1915)
- My Own United States (1918)
- Lost film
