= Sheldon Lewis =

American actor (1868–1958)

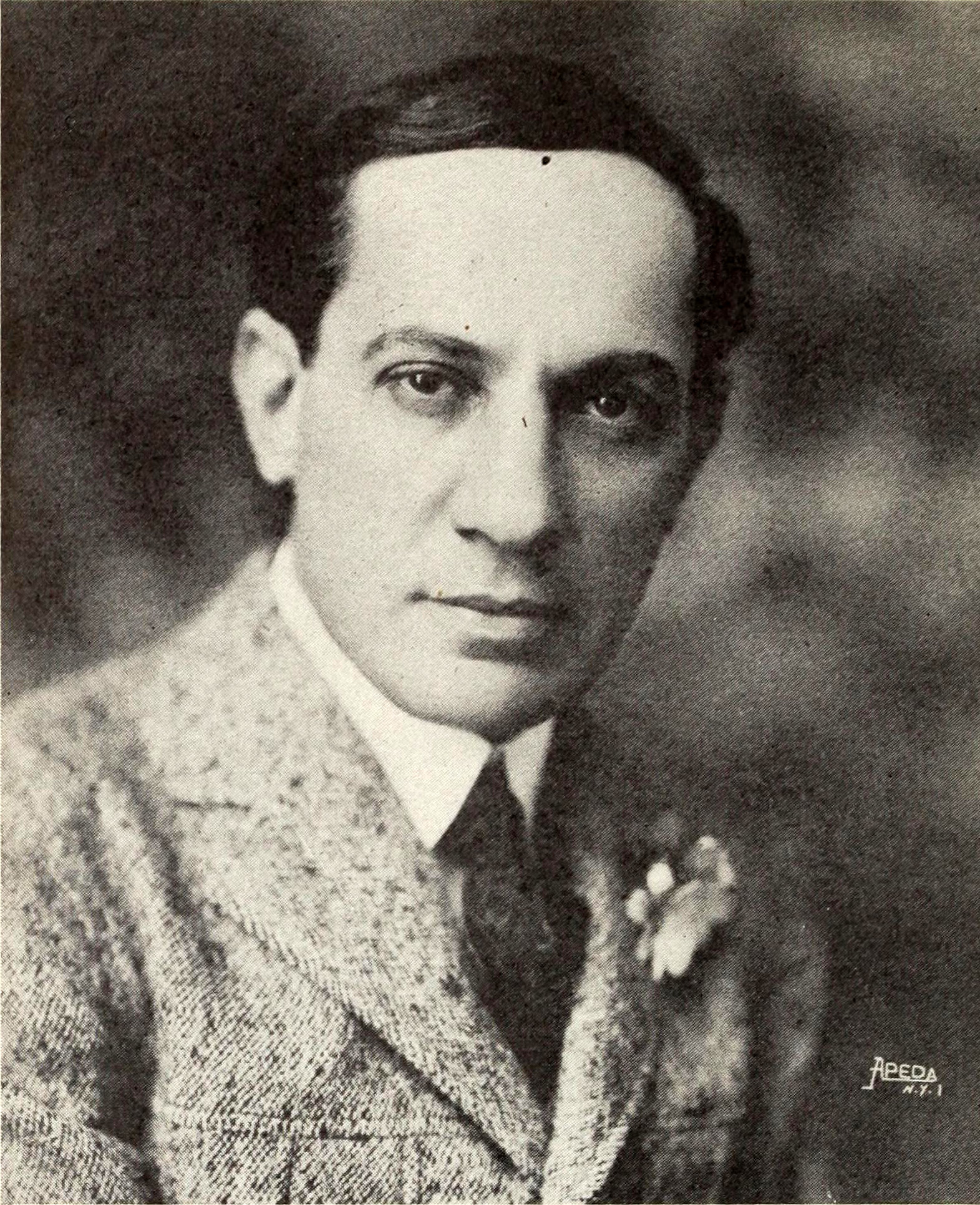
- Wid's Year Book, 1921
- Born: April 20, 1868; Philadelphia, Pennsylvania, US
- Died: May 7, 1958 (aged 90); Los Angeles, California, US
- Occupation: Actor
- Years active: 1914–1936
- Spouse: Virginia Pearson (m. 1911; div. 1928)

Sheldon Lewis (April 20, 1868 – May 7, 1958) was an American actor of the silent era best known for his antagonistic roles. He appeared in more than 90 films from 1914 to 1936.

== Biography ==
Sheldon Lewis was born in Philadelphia, Pennsylvania. He married actress Virginia Pearson on April 24, 1911. They were divorced in 1928. An Associated Press news brief about the divorce said that Pearson accused Lewis of "jealousy, ill temper and abuse." However, Pearson's obituary in The New York Times wrote "throughout the remaining years of their lives, they remained constant companions." The obituary indicated that the divorce was obtained because in that era marriage diminished a female film star's box-office appeal.

He starred in the 1907 Broadway production of The Primrose Path.

Lewis died in Los Angeles on May 7th, 1958. His interment was at Pierce Brothers Valhalla Memorial Park.

== Selected filmography ==
- The Exploits of Elaine (1914)
- An Affair of Three Nations (1915)
- The Menace of the Mute (1915)
- The House of Fear (1915)
- The Iron Claw (1916)
- The Hidden Hand (1917)
- The Bishop's Emeralds (1919)
- The Silent Barrier (1920)
- Dr. Jekyll and Mr. Hyde (1920)
- Orphans of the Storm (1921)
- When the Desert Calls (1922)
- Jacqueline (1923)
- The Little Red Schoolhouse (1923)
- The Enemy Sex (1924)
- In Fast Company (1924)
- The Dangerous Flirt (1924)
- Those Who Dare (1924)
- Missing Daughters (1924)
- The Sporting Chance (1925)
- Fighting the Flames (1925)
- Accused (1925)
- The Top of the World (1925)
- Bashful Buccaneer (1925)
- New Lives for Old (1925)
- The Lure of the Track (1925)
- With Kit Carson Over the Great Divide (1925)
- Super Speed (1925)
- The Mysterious Stranger (1925)
- Silent Sanderson (1925)
- Beyond the Trail (1926)
- Exclusive Rights (1926)
- Señor Daredevil (1926)
- The Self Starter (1926)
- The Two-Gun Man (1926)
- With Buffalo Bill on the U. P. Trail (1926)
- Don Juan (1926)
- A Desperate Moment (1926)
- Moran of the Mounted (1926)
- Life of an Actress (1927)
- Born to Battle (1927)
- The Cruise of the Hellion (1927)
- Hazardous Valley (1927)
- Driven from Home (1927)
- The Ladybird (1927)
- Turn Back the Hours (1928)
- Top Sergeant Mulligan (1928)
- The Chorus Kid (1928)
- The Little Wild Girl (1928)
- The Code of the Scarlet (1928)
- The River Woman (1928)
- Marlie the Killer (1928)
- Tarzan the Tiger (1929)
- Untamed Justice (1929)
- Black Magic (1929)
- Terry of the Times (1930)
- Firebrand Jordan (1930)
- Riders of the Rio (1931)
- The Monster Walks (1932)
- Tombstone Canyon (1932)
