= Hugh J. Jewett =

American politician (1817–1898)

Hugh Judge Jewett
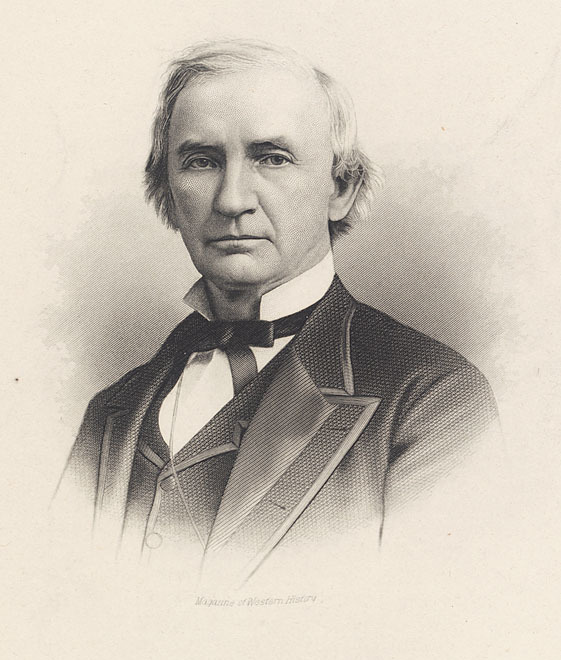

Member of the U.S. House of Representatives from Ohio's 12th district
- In office March 4, 1873 – June 23, 1874
- Preceded by: Philadelph Van Trump
- Succeeded by: William E. Finck

Member of the Ohio House of Representatives from Muskingum County
- In office January 6, 1868 – January 2, 1870
- Preceded by: A.W. Shipley; Perry Wiles
- Succeeded by: Edward Ball; Elias Ellis

Member of the Ohio Senate from the 15th district
- In office January 2, 1854 – January 6, 1856
- Preceded by: William E. Finck
- Succeeded by: Eli A. Spencer

Personal details
- Born: July 1, 1817 Harford County, Maryland, U.S.
- Died: March 6, 1898 (aged 80) Augusta, Georgia, U.S.
- Resting place: Woodlawn Cemetery, Zanesville, Ohio
- Party: Democratic
- Spouses: Sarah Jane Ellis (m. 1840; died 1850) Sarah Elizabeth Guthrie (m. 1853)
- Relations: Joshua Jewett (brother); Julia Hoyt (granddaughter)
- Children: 7
- Parent(s): John Jewett; Susannah Judge

Hugh Judge Jewett (July 1, 1817 – March 6, 1898) was an American railroader and politician. He served as the United States representative from Ohio's 12th congressional district in the 43rd United States Congress.

== Early life ==
Jewett was born at Harford County, Maryland, but spent most of his life in Ohio at Zanesville and Columbus. He was the son of John Jewett (1777–1854) and Susannah Judge (1778–1853). He was also the younger brother of Joshua Husband Jewett (1815–1861), a United States Congressman from Kentucky.

== Career ==
He attended Hopewell Academy in Chester County, Pennsylvania, before moving to Ohio as a young man and attending Hiram College. He was admitted to the bar at St. Clairsville in 1840 after studying with James Black Groome, who later became Governor of Maryland. He formed a law practice with Isaac Eaton, who became a prominent lawyer in Kansas.

In 1848, he moved to Zanesville, where he formed a law practice with John O'Neill, a member of Congress. He also served as president of the Muskingum branch of the State Bank of Ohio in 1852. In 1857, he served as president of the Central Ohio Railroad Company and organized the Pittsburgh, Cincinnati and St. Louis Railroad Company as well as the Pennsylvania Railroad.

In 1852, he was presidential elector, and supported Franklin Pierce for president. He was a member of the Ohio House of Representatives and the Ohio State Senate. In 1860, he ran for Congress and, in 1861, for Ohio Governor. He was a candidate for the United States Senate in 1863, losing each time as a Democrat. From March 4, 1873, to June 23, 1874, he served as United States Representative from Ohio's 12th congressional district in the 43rd United States Congress.

Jewett resigned his seat on June 23, 1874, and moved to New York City in order to become president of the Erie Railroad, which he served from July 1874 until October 1884. At the beginning of his tenure, the railroad was reorganized as the New York, Lake Erie and Western Railroad. On June 22, 1880, he led the railroad in converting from a 6 ft (1,829 mm) broad gauge to standard gauge, 4 ft 8 1/2 in (1,435 mm). In 1884, he retired from the New York, Lake Erie and Western Railroad and resided in New York City until his death.

The borough of Mount Jewett, Pennsylvania, is named for him, as he was president of the NYLE&WRR when it brought rail service to that area.

== Personal life ==
On June 20, 1840, Jewett was married to Sarah Jane Ellis (1819–1850) in St. Clairsville, Ohio. Sarah was one of five daughters born to Judge Ezer and Nancy (née McKinley) Ellis. One of her sisters was married to Ohio Governor Wilson Shannon, another to Rep. William Kennon, another to George Washington Manypenny, and another to Col. Isaac Eaton. Her mother was related to President William McKinley. Together, they were the parents of:

- John Ellis Jewett (1841–1895), who served in the U.S. Civil War and who married Emma Stevens, and later, Bessie Jacobs.
- Mary Kennon Jewett (1843–1849), who died young.
- George Manypenny Jewett (1845–1915), an inventor who married Helen M. Applegate (1849–1923).
- Charles Clarence Jewett (1849–1879), who died unmarried.

After his first wife's death in 1850, he remarried to Sarah Elizabeth (née Guthrie) Kelly (1823–1901) in Putnam, Ohio, on April 10, 1853. Sarah was the widow of Chauncey Regan Kelly, the daughter of Julius Chappell and Pamelia (née Buckingham) Guthrie, and a descendant of Thomas Welles, Chad Brown, Abraham Pierson, and several other prominent colonial figures. Together, they were the parents of:

- William Kennon Jewett (1857–1935), who founded the London Gold Mines Company of Colorado, one of the largest gold mines in the United States. He commissioned Arden Villa in 1913. He married Elisabeth "Patty" Kyle Stuart (b. 1858) in 1881.
- Helen Pamelia Jewett (b. 1858), who married Thomas Hunt, the son of Judge William Hunt, ex-Minister to Russia, in 1888.
- Sarah Guthrie Jewett (1862–1939), who married Julian Wainwright Robbins (d. 1934).

Jewett died on March 6, 1898, at the Bon Air Hotel in Augusta, Georgia. He was buried at the Woodlawn Cemetery in Zanesville, Ohio.

=== Descendants ===
Through his daughter Sarah, he was the grandfather of Sarah Jewett Robbins (b. 1890), a women's suffragist who was married to John W. Minturn in 1910, Van Rensselaer Choate King (1880–1927), from 1918 until their divorce in 1923, and William Lawrence Marsh. He was also the grandfather of Julia Wainwright Robbins (1897–1955), the prominent actress who appeared both on stage and in silent films.

U.S. House of Representatives
Preceded by Philadelph Van Trump	United States Representative for Ohio's 12th congressional district 1873 – 1874-06-23	Succeeded by William E. Finck
Business positions
Preceded by Peter H. Watson	President of Erie Railroad; July 1874 – October 1884	Succeeded by John King
Party political offices
Preceded by Rufus P. Ranney	Democratic Party nominee for Governor of Ohio; 1861	Succeeded by Clement Vallandigham
Ohio Senate
Preceded by William E. Finck	Senator from 15th District; January 2, 1854-January 6, 1856	Succeeded by Eli A. Spencer
Ohio House of Representatives
Preceded by A.W. Shipley; Perry Wiles	Representative from Muskingum County; January 6, 1868-January 2, 1870; Served alongside: Edward Ball	Succeeded by Edward Ball; Elias Ellis
