= The Menace of the Mute =

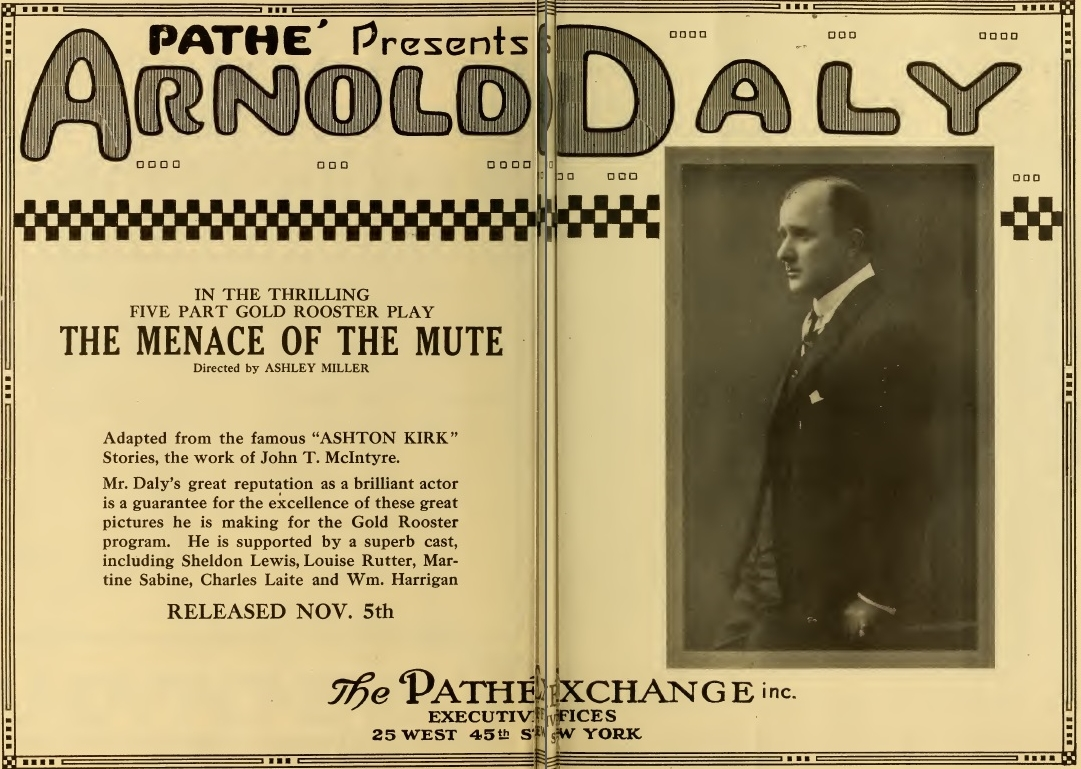
- Advertisement in Moving Picture World, November 1915
- Directed by: Arnold Daly; Ashley Miller
- Produced by: Arnold Daly
- Starring: Sheldon Lewis; William Harrigan; Arnold Daly
- Distributed by: Pathé Exchange, Inc.
- Release date: November 5, 1915
- Country: United States
- Language: Silent

The Menace of the Mute is a 1915 American silent film based on a short story by John T. McIntyre. It is the second film in the “Ashton-Kirk, Investigator” series, preceded by An Affair of Three Nations, and followed by The House of Fear. As with the first film in this series, it was directed by Ashley Miller and Arnold Daly, with Daly producing as well. The film is presumed lost.

== Plot ==
A young woman (Louise Rutter), who believes her fiancé (William Harrigan) may have committed a murder, asks Ashton Kirk to investigate the crime. The fiancé admits he went to the man's (Sheldon Lewis) home to retrieve plans for a submarine that was invented by his father, who is a scientist, and stolen by the murdered man, but the fiancé claims he left the home before retrieving the plans. Kirk uses a train conductor's punch ticket to discover the identity of the murderers, one of whom is a mute, and sets a trap to apprehend the suspects.

== Cast ==
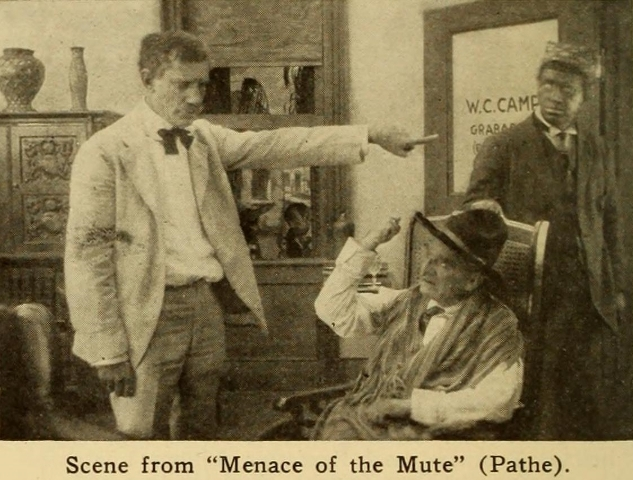
Scene from film, November 1915

- Arnold Daly - Ashton Kirk
- Sheldon Lewis - David Hume
- Louise Rutter - Edyth Vail
- William Harrigan - Allen Morris
- Charles Laite - Pendleton
- Martin Sabine
- George Melville

== Background ==
After completion of the film, Daly said in the November 1915 issue of The Moving Picture World that the picture made him think of the advertising slogan used in connection with a certain product - "more than a little better". He also stated that his film "is a distinct advance on my first, An Affair of Three Nations, and if I can continue to improve that way with each picture I shall be well pleased". Daly's next film in the Ashton-Kirk series, The House of Fear was released in 1915 as well.

== Reviews ==
Margaret I. MacDonald gave a positive review in The Moving Picture World at the time, saying that Daly knew how to "manufacture and stage a thrilling melodramatic situation". She also praised the production saying "its situations are tense, its photography good, and it has all the attributes of a good box office attraction".

The Buffalo Evening Times wrote that "a good detective picture relies for much of its suspense on the placement of the scenes. Instead of following in rational sequence, some are withheld until the time comes to clear the mystery, thus by their absence creating a mystery for the detective to expand his efforts on. This film derives much of its mystifying suspense from this arrangement of scenes, although Arnold Daly adds largely to the interest by his brilliant powers of detection". They further noted that "Daly is more than a mere figurehead, he carries the part with dominating actions. Daly acts the investigator down to the last detail, he makes one forget that he is merely playing the part. All in all, this is an excellent detective picture".

== See also ==
- Film preservation
- Lost film
