= The House of Fear (1915 film) =

1915 film

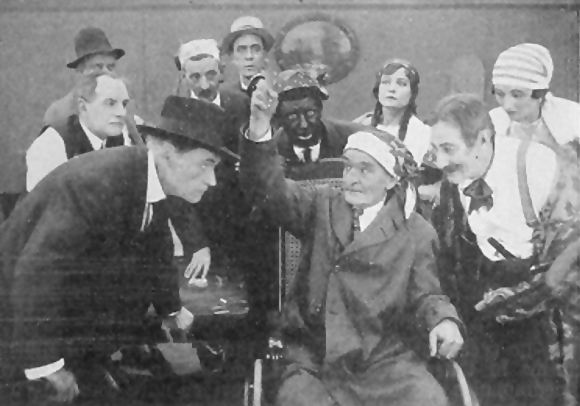
- Scene from House of Fear
- Directed by: Arnold Daly; Ashley Miller
- Written by: John Thomas McIntyre (story)
- Produced by: Arnold Daly
- Starring: Arnold Daly; Sheldon Lewis; Jeanne Eagels
- Cinematography: Eugene Gaudio
- Distributed by: Pathé Exchange, Inc.
- Release date: December 3, 1915
- Running time: 5 reels
- Country: United States
- Language: Silent (English intertitles)

The House of Fear is a 1915 American silent mystery film based on a story by John T. McIntyre. It was the third and final film in the Ashton-Kirk, Investigator series, all directed by Ashley Miller and Arnold Daly and starring Daly.

This film is presumed lost.

== Synopsis ==
Grace Cramp (Jeanne Eagels) and her brother Charles (Sheldon Lewis), ask Ashton-Kirk to investigate strange events involving Mexicans that are occurring at their house. Ashton-Kirk learns from information provided by an agent in Mexico that their father had been an engraver who made forged currency plates when in need of money. The siblings' father had forged currency plates for a thief (Charles Kraus) but had never delivered them. The thief's aunt, Miss Hohenlo (Ina Hammer), and her accomplices have been breaking into the father's house to try to find the engraving plates. Ashton-Kirk captures the intruders and destroys the forged plates.

== Cast ==
- Arnold Daly as Ashton-Kirk
- Sheldon Lewis as Charles Cramp
- Jeanne Eagels as Grace Cramp
- Ina Hammer as Miss Hohenlo
- Charles Laite as Harry Pendleton
- Charles Kraus as Alva
- William Bechtel
- Martin Sabine

== Production ==
After his popular portrayal of detective Craig Kennedy in the Pearl White serial The Exploits of Elaine, Pathé signed Arnold Daly to do his own series featuring Ashton-Kirk, a detective character created by John T. McIntyre. The House of Fear was the third and last film in the series; the first was An Affair of Three Nations, followed by The Menace of the Mute.

== Release ==
The House of Fear was released December 3, 1915.

The film received a favorable review in The Moving Picture World, which said that it was "... splendidly produced and has action every moment". The Motography reviewer was also positive and remarked on how it held the interest. The reviewer for the New York Dramatic Mirror judged the plot "none too strong", but was impressed by the camerawork: "Seldom has more perfect photography been seen in any picture." Hammer's performance as the aunt was also singled out as "very good".

== See also ==
- List of lost films
