= Julia Hoyt =

American actress (1897–1955)

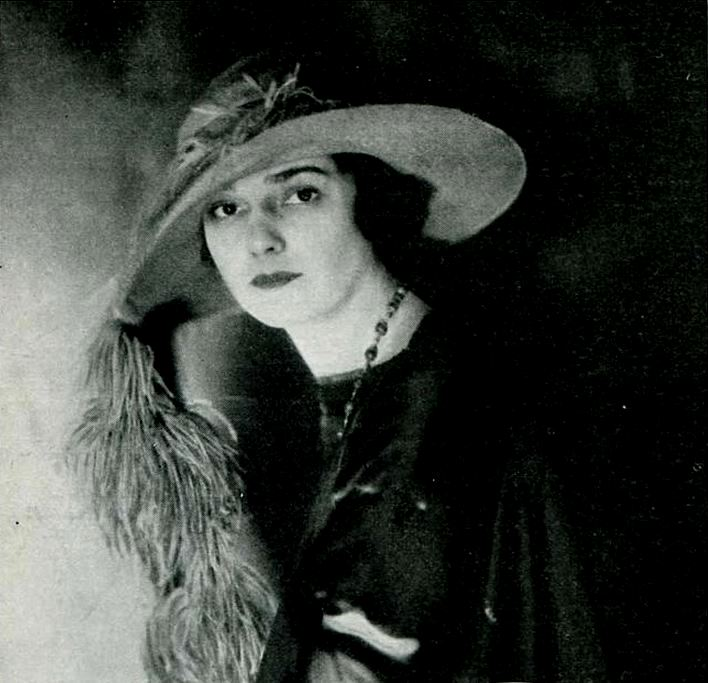
- Hoyt in a 1920 portrait by E.O. Hoppé, as published in a 1922 issue of Tattler
- Born: Julia Wainwright Robbins; September 15, 1897
- Died: October 31, 1955 (aged 58)
- Spouses: Lydig Hoyt (m. 1914; div. 1924) Louis Calhern (m. 1927; div. 1932) Aquila C. Giles (m. 1935)
- Parent(s): Julian W. Robbins; Sarah G. Jewett
- Relatives: Hugh J. Jewett (grandfather)

Julia Hoyt (September 15, 1897 – October 31, 1955) was an American actress on stage and in silent films.

== Early life ==
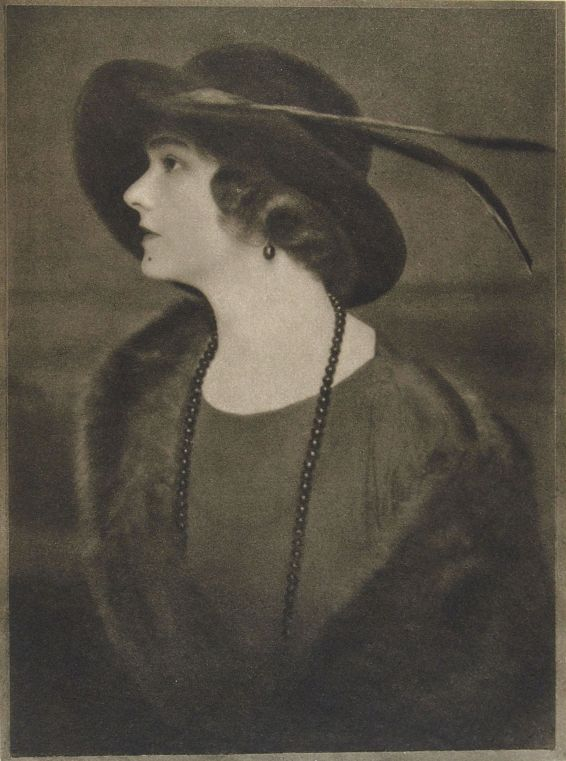
Mrs. Lydig Hoyt, portrait by E.O. Hoppé, 1922

Julia Wainwright Robbins was born in 1897, the daughter of Julian W. Robbins and Sarah Guthrie (née Jewett) Robbins (1862–1939). Her grandfather Hugh Judge Jewett was president of the Erie Railroad and a congressman from Ohio.

== Career ==
Julia Robbins performed on stage as a debutante in charity entertainments. Films she appeared in included The Wonderful Thing (1921) with Norma Talmadge, The Man Who Found Himself (1925), and Camille (1926). During World War I, she lent her image and name to an American Red Cross campaign for the employment of disabled veterans.

On Broadway, she was in a revival of The Squaw Man (1921) by Edwin Milton Royle, Rose Briar (1922) by Booth Tarkington, The Virgin of Bethulia (1925) by Gladys Buchanan Unger, The School for Scandal (1925), The Pearl of Great Price (1926), The Dark (1927), Mrs. Dane's Defense (1928), Within the Law (1928) by Bayard Veiller, Sherlock Holmes (1928), Serena Blandish (1929), The Rhapsody (1930) by Louis K. Anspacher, The Wiser they Are (1931), and Hay Fever (1931–32) by Noël Coward, with Constance Collier.

Her fashion business, named Julia Hoyt Modes, designed dresses and coats sold in department stores across the United States. She wrote syndicated articles about etiquette and fashion. In 1924, she wrote a series of reports from a European trip for the Bridgeport Post.

== Personal life ==
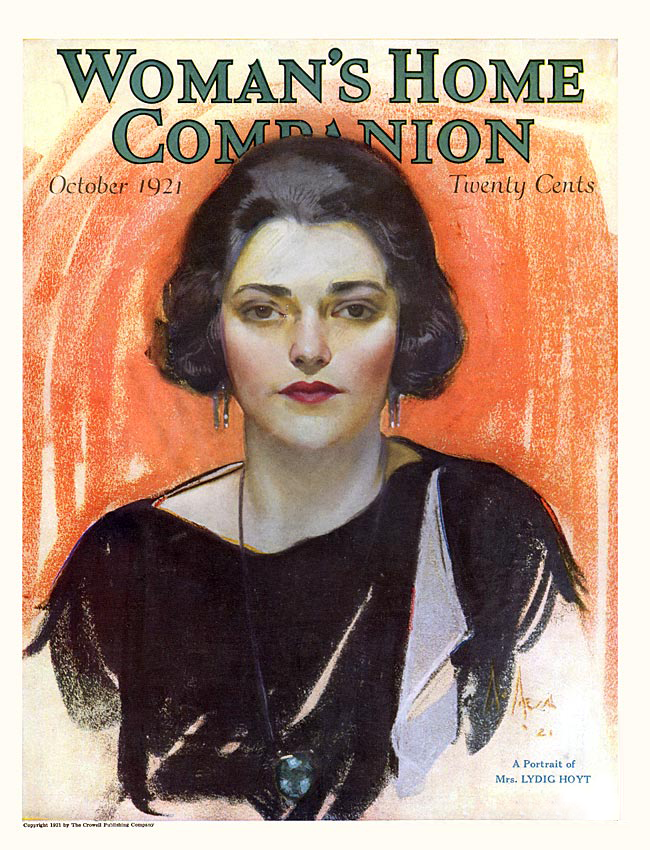
A portrait of Julia Hoyt by Neysa McMein, on the cover of Woman's Home Companion in 1921.

Julia Hoyt was considered a great beauty, and sat for portraits by Paul Helleu, Neysa McMein (for the cover of Woman's Home Companion in 1921 and McCall's in May 1923), John Singer Sargent and Carl Van Vechten.

Julia Robbins was married three times, first to lawyer Lydig Hoyt in 1914, as his second wife, when she was 17 years old. They had two children who died in infancy, and divorced in 1924. She later wed actor Louis Calhern in 1927, the same year they co-starred in The Dark on Broadway; she divorced him in 1932. In 1935, she wed motion picture executive Aquila C. Giles.

Hoyt had several health problems in the late 1930s, including pneumonia while at sea in 1935, and a lasting chest infection that necessitated the removal of ribs. Julia Hoyt Giles died in 1955 from a heart attack at age 58.
