= A Desperate Moment =

1926 film directed by Jack Dawn

- Directed by: Jack Dawn
- Written by: Coral Burnette; Bertha M. Price
- Starring: Wanda Hawley; Theodore von Eltz; Sheldon Lewis
- Cinematography: Roland Price
- Edited by: Joe Rock
- Production company: Banner Productions
- Distributed by: Henry Ginsberg Distributing Company
- Release date: January 19, 1926
- Running time: 6 reels
- Country: United States
- Language: Silent (English intertitles)

A Desperate Moment is a 1926 American silent drama film directed by Jack Dawn and starring Wanda Hawley, Theodore von Eltz, and Sheldon Lewis.

== Plot ==
As described in a film magazine review, while on a yachting trip with her father, Virginia Dean falls in love with Captain John Reynolds. The schooner is seized by bandit stowaways, who kill several crewmembers, and then set the elder Peter Dean and the remaining crew adrift, but hold Virginia and John hostage. The vessel catches fire and burns to the waterline and is abandoned, the survivors reaching a tropical island. While the gangsters reform, their leader Blackie Slade incites the island's natives to attack the party. Blackie is slain and the others are rescued by a passing steamer. John and Virginia are then united.

== Cast ==
- Wanda Hawley as Virginia Dean
- Theodore von Eltz as Captain John Reynolds
- Sheldon Lewis as Blackie Slade
- Leo White as Percy Warren
- Dan Mason as Jim Warren
- James Neill as Peter Dean
- Billy Franey as Sam

== Bibliography ==
- Munden, Kenneth White. The American Film Institute Catalog of Motion Pictures Produced in the United States, Part 1. University of California Press, 1997.
