= Blyth Daly =

British-American actress

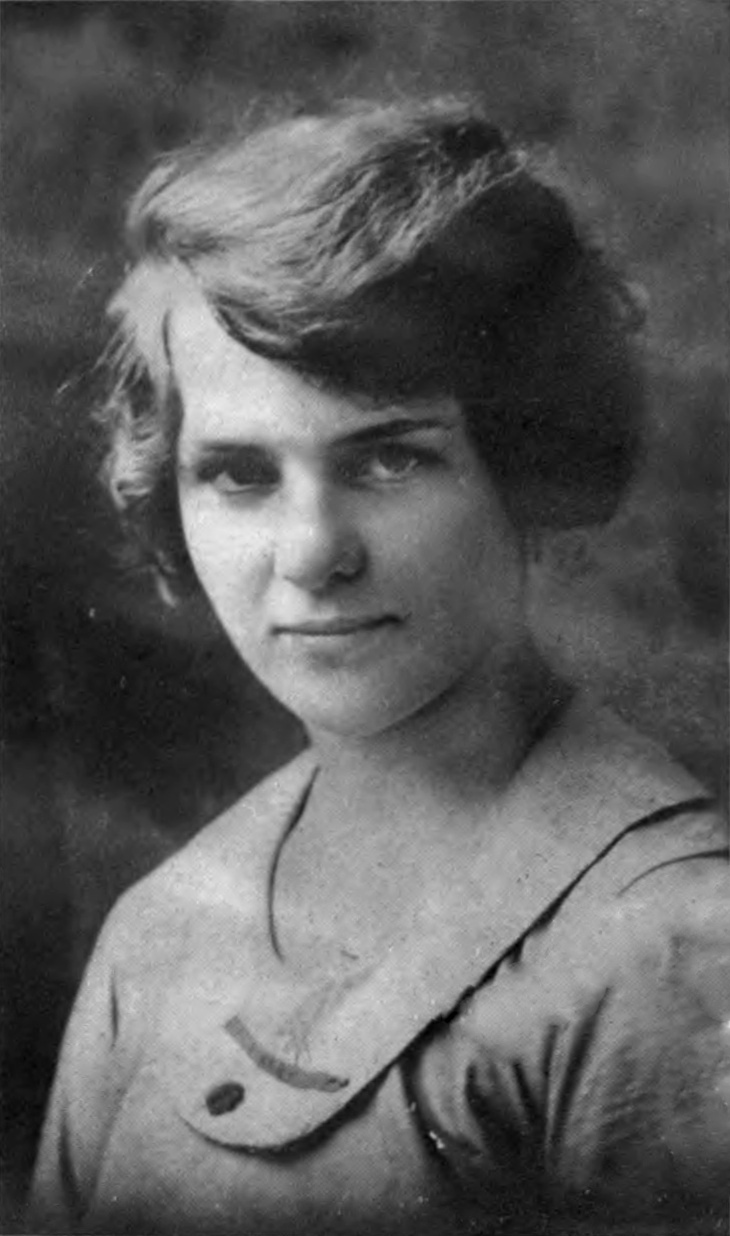
- Born: December 5, 1901; London, England
- Died: October 16, 1965 (aged 63); Los Angeles, California, U.S.
- Other names: Blythe Daley
- Occupation: Actress

Blyth Daly, also spelled Blythe Daley (December 5, 1901 – October 16, 1965) was an actress who appeared in stage productions on Broadway and who appeared in several silent and sound films. She is better known for her relationships and friendships in the underworld of the Hollywood and New York City lesbian acting community than for her acting career itself. She was the daughter of established stage actor Arnold Daly and his wife Mary Blythe.

In 1919, Frank Case, manager of the Algonquin Hotel, began hosting popular and well known members of the acting and writing community, with the group being dubbed the "Algonquin Round Table", with members including Edna Ferber, actress Tallulah Bankhead, Harpo Marx and others. Daly, never a regular member of the group, attended through her association with Bankhead, Estelle Winwood and actress Eva Le Gallienne, with the four of them being dubbed "The Four Riders of the Algonquin".

Daly was bisexual, as was Bankhead, and Le Gallienne was well known inside the acting community as being lesbian. The three became close friends and associates for decades, but of the three, Daly's acting career never took off to the same extent. She had many bit-parts in early silent films (always uncredited), and from the 1930s to 1950s she had many small appearances in both silent and then talking films, which decreased as time went on, while she failed to break into mid roles or starring roles. By the 1960s she had all but disappeared, apart from a minor role in The Chapman Report (1962).

Daly died on October 16, 1965, aged 63.

== Filmography ==
- The Chapman Report (1962)
- A Star Is Born (1954) as Miss Fusselow
- The Model and the Marriage Broker (1951) as Receptionist
- It's a Joke, Son! (1947) as Daughters of Dixie member
- That's Gratitude (1934) as Nora
- Her Man (1930) as Dance Hall Girl
