= The Man Who (film) =

1921 film directed by Maxwell Karger

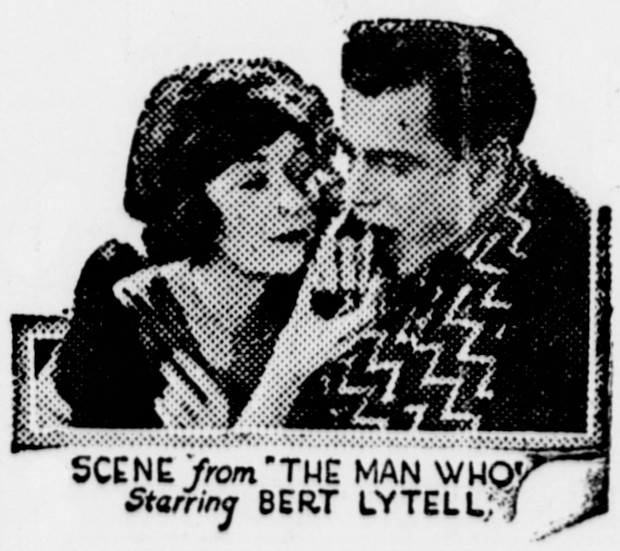
- From a newspaper
- Directed by: Maxwell Karger
- Written by: June Mathis
- Based on: the short story, "The Man Who" by: Lloyd Osborne
- Starring: Bert Lytell; Lucy Cotton; Virginia Valli
- Cinematography: Arthur Martinelli
- Production company: Metro Pictures
- Release date: July 4, 1921 (US)
- Running time: 6 reels
- Country: United States
- Language: English

The Man Who is a 1921 American silent comedy film. Directed by Maxwell Karger, the film stars Bert Lytell, Lucy Cotton, and Virginia Valli. It was released on July 4, 1921.

== Cast ==
- Bert Lytell as Bedford Mills
- Lucy Cotton as Helen Jessop
- Virginia Valli as Mary Turner
- Frank Currier as St. John Jessop
- Tammany Young as Shorty Mulligan
- Fred Warren as Bud Carter
- Clarence Elmer as Radford Haynes
- William Roselle as Bing Horton
- Mary Louise Beaton as Sarah Butler
- Frank R. Strayer as Jack Hyde (credited as Frank Strayer)

== Preservation status ==
- A print of the film was preserved by MGM.
