= The Self Starter =

1926 film

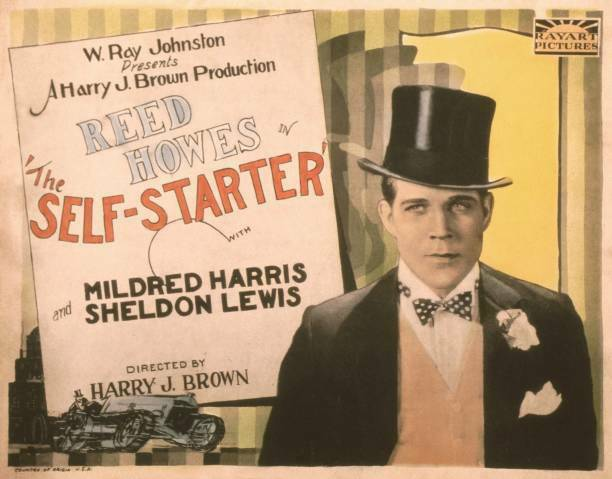
- Directed by: Harry Joe Brown
- Written by: Harry Joe Brown
- Produced by: W. Ray Johnston; Harry Joe Brown
- Starring: Reed Howes; Mildred Harris; Sheldon Lewis
- Production company: Harry J. Brown Productions
- Distributed by: Rayart Pictures; Butcher's Film Service (UK)
- Release date: May 3, 1926
- Running time: 50 minutes
- Country: United States
- Languages: Silent; English intertitles

The Self Starter is a 1926 American silent comedy film directed by Harry Joe Brown and starring Reed Howes, Mildred Harris and Sheldon Lewis. It was distributed by the independent Rayart Pictures.

== Synopsis ==
Returning from service in World War I Jerry Neale invents a new self starting ignition system that can power tanks and tractors. He falls in love with young actress Ruth Atkin, but faces a rival in Dan Hicks who also tries to steal his invention.

== Cast ==
- Reed Howes as Jerry Neale
- Mildred Harris as Ruth Atkin
- Sheldon Lewis as Buddy
- John Sinclair as Soly
- Harry Tenbrook as Dan Hicks
- Lionel Belmore as Crane

== Bibliography ==
- Connelly, Robert B. The Silents: Silent Feature Films, 1910-36, Volume 40, Issue 2. December Press, 1998.
- Munden, Kenneth White. The American Film Institute Catalog of Motion Pictures Produced in the United States, Part 1. University of California Press, 1997. ISBN 0520209699, 9780520209695
