= Arnold Daly =

American actor

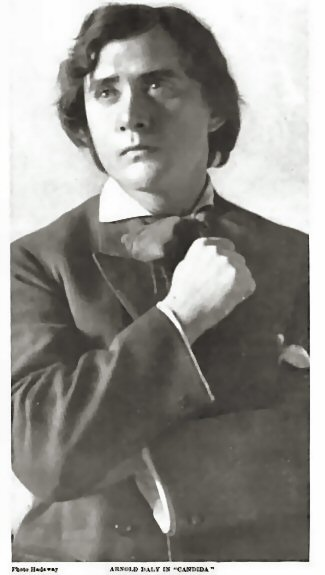
Arnold Daly as Eugene Marchbanks in Shaw's Candida (1903)

Arnold Daly (October 4, 1875 – January 13, 1927) was an American actor, playwright, and producer. He was the father of actress and Algonquin Round Table personality Blyth Daly.

== Biography ==
He was born Peter Christopher Arnold Daly in Brooklyn, New York, the son of Irish parents Joseph J. Daly and Mary Arnold. His father was an importer of wood for use in cabinet construction. After being expelled from four public schools, he finally left parochial school following the death of his father in 1886. He made his first appearance as an actor in The Jolly Squire, 1892.

During his career he claimed credit for a hundred plays, although many were either adapted from foreign plays or written by his brother Joseph. He was noted for introducing the early Shaw plays to American audiences, including Candida, Mrs. Warren's Profession and You Can Never Tell. The play Mrs. Warren's Profession was closed after a single showing by the authorities due to its depiction of a prostitute. Shaw was noted for his extremely detailed stage directions, which some actors found overly prescriptive. Daly said "I have acted out every one of Mr. Shaw's stage directions to the letter, as far as I am able, with one exception, and that is where Marchbanks goes 'trotting' across the stage to the fireplace. I'm too heavy to trot as Shaw meant. Three years ago I could have done it, and now perhaps I might do it three nights in six. But I don't dare risk it."

With the advent of silent film, Daly became a matinee idol. Between 1914 and 1915, he portrayed the detective Craig Kennedy in three Pearl White serials. He produced and co-directed three Ashton-Kirk films, while also portraying the lead role. Daly was also in the cast of The Port of Missing Men (1914), Idols (1916), My Own United States (1918), For Another Woman (1924) and In Borrowed Plumes (1926). In 1916, he produced The King's Game.

== Death ==
On the morning of January 13, 1927, Arnold Daly died after his apartment building in New York City caught fire. His body was later found just feet away from an open window that overlooked a rooftop within easy reach. At the time, Daly was recovering from a serious head injury suffered two months earlier, leading to speculation that this may have a played factor in his inability to escape. He was 51 years old. Daly was survived by his daughter Blyth and former wife, actress, Mary Blyth (Mrs. Frank Craven).

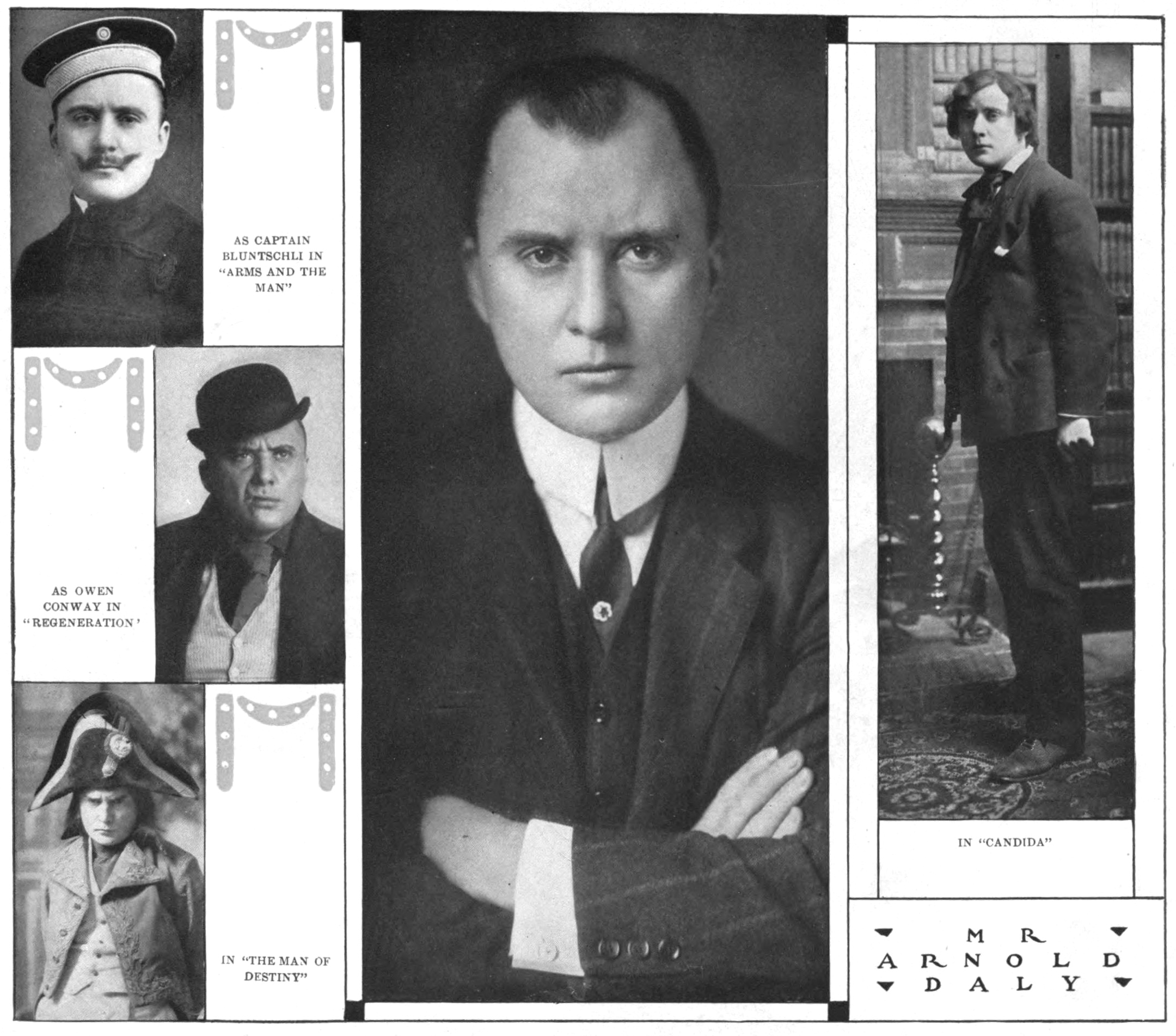
Arnold Daly as (counter clockwise): Captain Bluntschli, Arms and the Man; Owen Conway, The Regeneration; Napoleon Bonaparte, The Man of Destiny; Arnold Daly; Eugene Marchbanks, Candida. (From The American Stage of To-Day, ed. William Winter, 1910)

== Partial filmography ==
- The Exploits of Elaine (1914)
- The Romance of Elaine (1915)
- An Affair of Three Nations (1915)
- The Menace of the Mute (1915)
- The House of Fear (1915)
- My Own United States (1918)
- For Another Woman (1924)
- In Borrowed Plumes (1926)
