= Lucy Cotton =

American actress

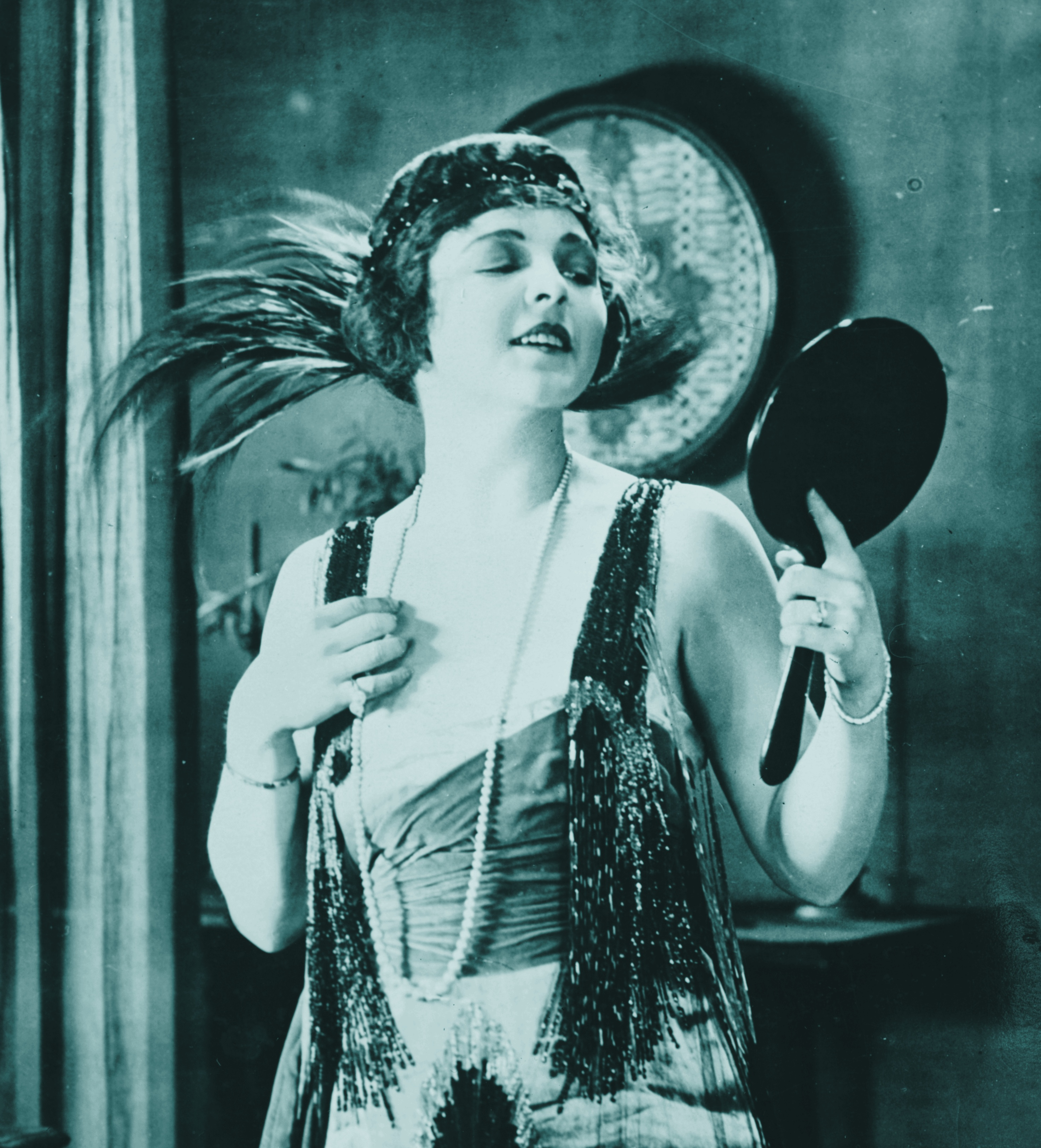
- Cotton in 1920
- Born: August 29, 1895; Houston, Texas U.S.
- Died: December 12, 1948 (aged 53); Miami Beach, Florida U.S.
- Spouses: Edward Russell Thomas (m. 1924; died 1926); Lytton Grey Ament (m. 1927; div. 1930); Charles Hann Jr. (m. 1931; div. 1932); William M. Magraw (m. 1932; div. 1941); Prince Vladimir Eristavi-Tchitcherine (m. 1941)
- Children: 1

Lucy Cotton (August 29, 1895 – 12 December 1948) was an American actress who appeared in 12 films from 1910 to 1921.

== Biography ==
Cotton was born in Houston, Texas and died in Miami Beach, Florida. She went to New York City in her teens and found her first role on Broadway in the chorus of The Quaker Girl. In 1915, Cotton appeared on stage in Polygamy at the Park Theatre in New York City. She then starred in the 1919 production of Up in Mabel's Room. She had a supporting role in Turn to the Right, which ran on Broadway for 443 performances during 1916-1917.

As a popular actress, her personal life was closely followed by the press. In 1924, she married Edward Russell Thomas, publisher of the New York Morning Telegraph. He died two years afterward in July 1926, leaving a sizeable fortune of $27 million and a young daughter, Lucetta, behind. After that she had a series of marriages that did not last; Lytton Grey Ament (from 1927 to 1930), lawyer Charles Hann Jr. (from 1931 to 1932), William M. Magraw, president of Manhattan's Underground Installations Company (from 1932 to 1941), and a Georgian-Russian Prince Vladimir Eristavi-Tchitcherine (married June 15, 1941, at a Russian Orthodox Church in New York City).

After Cotton's death, her daughter Lucetta Cotton Thomas (she changed her name to Mary Frances Thomas) decided to have her cremated in Miami, and her ashes were sent to New York City, where her funeral was held.

== Selected filmography ==
- The Fugitive (1910)
- Life Without Soul (1915)
- The Prodigal Wife (1918)
- The Broken Melody (1919)
- The Miracle of Love (1919)
- The Sin That Was His (1920)
- The Misleading Lady (1920)
- The Devil (1921)
- The Man Who (1921)
- Whispering Shadows (1921)
