= Whispering Shadows =

1921 silent film

- Directed by: Emile Chautard
- Based on: The Invisible Foe by Walter Hackett
- Starring: Lucy Cotton; Charles A. Stevenson; Philip Merivale
- Production company: Peerless Pictures
- Distributed by: World Film
- Release date: June 6, 1921
- Running time: 60 minutes
- Country: United States
- Languages: Silent; English intertitles

Whispering Shadows is a 1921 American silent drama film directed by Emile Chautard and starring Lucy Cotton, Charles A. Stevenson and Philip Merivale. It is based on the 1917 play The Invisible Foe by Walter Hackett, the rights for which were acquired for six thousand dollars. It was distributed independently on a states rights basis, partly by the former major studio World Film which released it in several markets.

== Plot ==
Helen Bransby is the daughter of Richard Bransby, a wealthy industrialist. She is engaged to Hugh Brook, an employee in her father's business who plans to leave to rejoin the army. Bransby's nephew Stephen Pryde is jealous of Hugh and has designs on Helen. He forges business records to make it appear that Hugh has been embezzling money from the firm. Bransby confronts Hugh, who adamantly denies the theft and vows not to see Helen until he has cleared his name. Stephen advises Hugh to enlist in the army under a false name, to prevent Bransby from thwarting his plans. Bransby subsequently realizes that Stephen had forged Hugh's handwriting and forces him to write a confession. Before Bransby can take further action he dies suddenly, leaving Stephen's confession between the pages of a copy of David Copperfield which his sister then reshelves.

Helen, now living in the city, refuses to allow Bransby's study in the Long Island house to be touched. After a period of time and with no word from Hugh, she reluctantly accepts Stephen's marriage proposal. Stephen is eager to get access to the study to find and destroy his confession. Helen writes to her aunt to tell her to give Stephen the keys, but finds her hand writing a mysterious phrase that refers to David Copperfield. Sensing that this may be a message from her dead father, she follows Stephen to the house and finds that Hugh has also returned there. Stephen's confession is discovered and Helen and Hugh are now free to marry.

== Cast ==
- Lucy Cotton as Helen Bransby
- Charles A. Stevenson as Richard Bransby
- Philip Merivale as Stephen Pryde
- Robert Barrat as Hugh Brook
- Mabel Archdall as Aunt Caroline Leavitt
- George Cowl as Dr. Latham
- Alfred Dundas as Morton Grant
- Marion Rogers as Margaret Latham
- Celestine Saunders as The Medium

== Bibliography ==
- John T. Soister, Henry Nicolella & Steve Joyce. American Silent Horror, Science Fiction and Fantasy Feature Films, 1913-1929. McFarland, 2014.
