= Frank Conroy (actor) =

British actor (1890–1964)

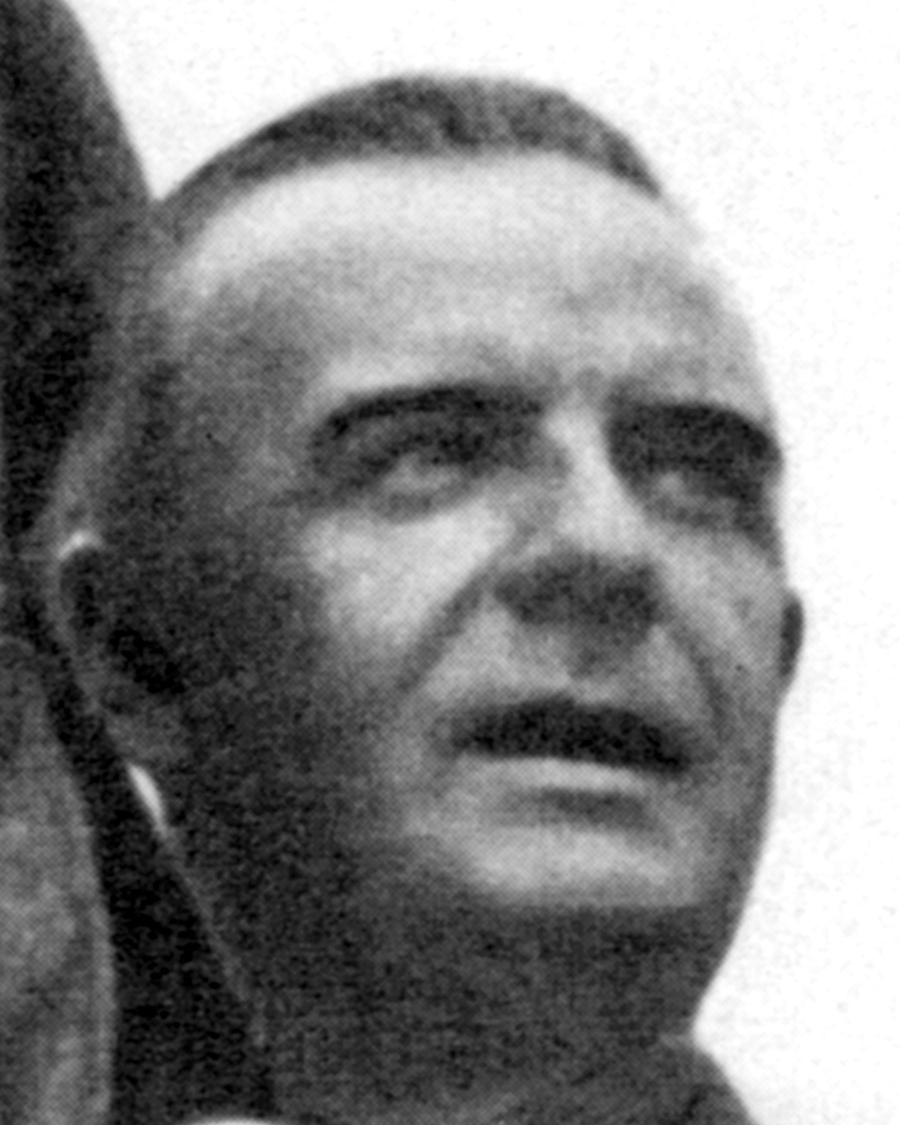
- Conroy in On Borrowed Time (June 1938)
- Born: Frank Meinberg Conroy; 14 October 1890; Derby, Derbyshire, England
- Died: 24 February 1964 (aged 73); Paramus, New Jersey, U.S.
- Years active: 1912–1961
- Spouse: Helen Robbins
- Children: 1

Frank Meinberg Conroy (14 October 1890 – 24 February 1964) was a British film and stage actor who appeared in many films, notably Grand Hotel (1932), The Little Minister (1934) and The Ox-Bow Incident (1943).

== Career ==
Born in Derbyshire, Derby, England, Conroy began acting on stage in 1908. He acted in Shakespearean plays in England from 1910 until he moved to the United States in 1915. He was responsible for building the Greenwich Village Theatre which opened in 1917, and he directed productions of the repertory theater there for three years.

He appeared in more than 40 Broadway plays, beginning with The Passing Show of 1913 (1913) and ending with Calculated Risk (1962). He won a Tony Award for best supporting actor for his performance in Graham Greene's The Potting Shed (1957).

Conroy's work on television included appearances on Kraft Theater and The Play of the Week.

== Personal life and death ==
Conroy had a wife, Ruth, and a son, Richard. He died of heart disease in Paramus, New Jersey, at age 73.

== Select Broadway credits ==
- The Passing Show of 1913 (1913)
- The Bad Man (1920) as Gilbert Jones
- Daddy's Gone A-Huntin' (1921) as Julien Fields
- Rose Briar (1922) as Mr. Valentine
- The Constant Wife (1926) as Bernard Kersal
- Wings Over Europe (1928) as Arthur
- On Borrowed Time (1938) as Mr. Brink
- The Little Foxes (1939) as Horace
- The Potting Shed (1957) as Father William Callifer
- Calculated Risk (1962) as Clyde Norman

== Partial filmography ==
- The Royal Family of Broadway (1930) – Gilmore Marshall
- Hell Divers (1931) – Chaplain
- Bad Company (1931) – Markham King
- Possessed (1931) – Horace Travers
- West of Broadway (1931) – Judge Barham
- Manhattan Parade (1931) – Bill Brighton
- Disorderly Conduct (1932) – Tony Alsotto
- Grand Hotel (1932) – Rohna
- Ann Carver's Profession (1933) – Baker (uncredited)
- Midnight Mary (1933) – District Attorney
- The Man Who Dared (1933) – Con Artist (uncredited)
- Storm at Daybreak (1933) – Archduke Franz Ferdinand (uncredited)
- Night Flight (1933) – Radio Operator
- Ace of Aces (1933) – Maj. / Lt. Col. Wentworth
- The Kennel Murder Case (1933) – Brisbane Coe
- Frontier Marshal (1934) – George 'Oscar' Reid
- The Cat and the Fiddle (1934) – Theatre Owner
- Keep 'Em Rolling (1934) – Captain R.G. Deane
- The Crime Doctor (1934) – Martin Crowder
- Upper World (1934) – Paul—Stream's Attorney (uncredited)
- Manhattan Melodrama (1934) as Blackie's Lawyer
- Sadie McKee (1934) – Dr. Briggs (uncredited)
- Little Miss Marker (1934) – Doctor Ingalls (uncredited)
- Such Women Are Dangerous (1934) – Bronson
- Return of the Terror (1934) – Prosecuting Attorney
- The Captain Hates the Sea (1934) – State's Attorney (uncredited)
- Wednesday's Child (1934) – The Judge
- Evelyn Prentice (1934) – Dist. Atty. Farley
- I'll Fix It (1934) – District Attorney (uncredited)
- The White Parade (1934) – Dr. Thorne
- 365 Nights in Hollywood (1934) – Studio Executive (uncredited)
- The Little Minister (1934) – Lord Rintoul
- West Point of the Air (1935) – Captain Cannon
- Charlie Chan in Egypt (1935) – Prof. John Thurston
- Dante's Inferno (1935) – Defense Attorney (uncredited)
- The Call of the Wild (1935) – John Blake
- I Live My Life (1935) – Doctor
- She Couldn't Take It (1935) – Attorney Henry Raleigh (uncredited)
- The Last Days of Pompeii (1935) – Gaius Tanno
- Show Them No Mercy! (1935) – Reed
- Nobody's Fool (1936) – Jake Cavendish
- The White Angel (1936) – Mr. Le Froy
- Meet Nero Wolfe (1936) – Dr. Nathaniel Bradford
- The Gorgeous Hussy (1936) – John C. Calhoun
- Charlie Chan at the Opera (1936) – Mr. Whitely
- Stolen Holiday (1937) – Dupont
- Love Is News (1937) – A.G. Findlay
- Nancy Steele Is Missing! (1937) – Dan Mallon
- That I May Live (1937) – Pop
- This Is My Affair (1937) – President William McKinley
- The Jones Family in Big Business (1937) – Leland Whitney
- The Emperor's Candlesticks (1937) – Col. Radoff
- Music for Madame (1937) – Morton Harding
- The Last Gangster (1937) – Sid Gorman
- Wells Fargo (1937) – Ward – Banker
- This Woman is Mine (1941) – First Mate Fox
- The Adventures of Martin Eden (1942) – Carl Brissenden
- Crossroads (1942) – Defense Attorney (uncredited)
- The Loves of Edgar Allan Poe (1942) – John Allan
- Crash Dive (1943) – Capt. Bryson (uncredited)
- Lady of Burlesque (1943) – 'Stacchi' Stacciaro
- The Ox-Bow Incident (1943) – Major Tetley
- That Hagen Girl (1947) – Dr. Stone
- The Naked City (1948) – Captain Donahue
- All My Sons (1948) – Herbert Deever
- For the Love of Mary (1948) – Samuel Litchfield
- Rogues' Regiment (1948) – Colonel Lemercier
- Sealed Verdict (1948) – Col. Pike
- The Snake Pit (1948) – Dr. Jonathan Gifford
- Mighty Joe Young (1949) – Reporter (uncredited)
- The Threat (1949) – District Attorney Barker MacDonald
- Lightning Strikes Twice (1951) – J.D. Nolan
- The Day the Earth Stood Still (1951) – Mr. Harley (uncredited)
- The Last Mile (1959) – O'Flaherty
- The Young Philadelphians (1959) – Doctor Shippen Stearnes
- The Bramble Bush (1960) – Dr. Sol Kelsey
