= George Washington Manypenny =

American journalist (1808–1892)

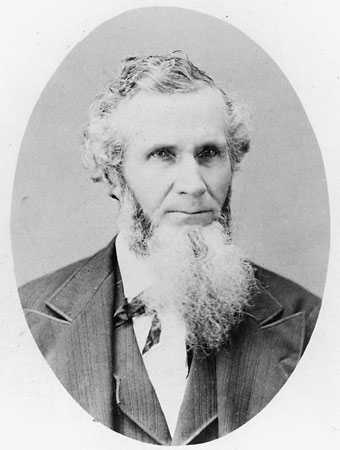

7th Commissioner of Indian Affairs
- In office 1853–1857
- Appointed by: Franklin Pierce
- Preceded by: Luke Lea
- Succeeded by: James W. Denver

Personal details
- Born: 1808 Uniontown, Pennsylvania, U.S.
- Died: July 15, 1892 (aged 83–84) Bowie, Maryland, U.S.
- Spouses: Miss Ellis; Emeline Neale (died 1849): Mary B. Woods
- Children: 5
- Occupation: Government official; newspaperman; lawyer

George Washington Manypenny (1808 – July 15, 1892) was the Commissioner of Indian Affairs of the United States from 1853 to 1857.

== Early life ==
George Washington Manypenny was born in 1808 in Uniontown, Pennsylvania. He moved to Ohio around 1830 and settled in St. Clairsville, Ohio.

== Career ==
After moving to St. Clairsville, Manypenny became the editor and proprietor of the St. Clairsville Gazette. He owned a stage line that ran on the National Road, from Maryland to Ohio. He also served as superintendent of a portion of the National Road. In 1836, Manypenny and two partners organized the Opposition Defiance Fast Lane, a mail carrier organization. In 1838, Manypenny moved to Zanesville, Ohio. He worked as a contractor on the first dam and canal in Zanesville on the Muskingum River.

In 1842, Manypenny was admitted to the bar in Muskingum County. He practiced law with Corrington Searle and John O'Neill. He served as clerk of the circuit court based in Zanesville from 1841 to 1846.

In 1853, Manypenny was a competitor at the Democratic State Convention for governor, but lost the nomination to William Medill. Manypenny was appointed as Commissioner of Indian Affairs during the administration of President Franklin Pierce, serving from 1853 to 1857. He was responsible for settling 52 treaties during his tenure, many of them in Kansas and Nebraska. He was offered the role of commissioner again by President Abraham Lincoln during his second administration, but Manypenny declined. He held the position of special Indian commissioner under appointments by Presidents Grant, Hayes and Garfield.

Manypenny then moved to Columbus, Ohio. From 1859 to 1862 Manypenny was editor of the Ohio Statesman. He then retired from the newspaper business. He was appointed as Superintendent of the Ohio State Canals by the Governor, and worked as the general manager of the public works of Ohio. He ran as a Democratic candidate for the United States Senate, but lost in the Democratic caucus. In 1876 Manypenny was appointed chair of a special commission to investigate the issues that led to the Sioux outbreak that year, which included the defeat of the American forces under George Armstrong Custer at the battle of the Little Bighorn. In 1880 Manypenny served as president of the commission for the Ute people.

In 1880 Manypenny wrote Our Indian Wards which detailed a variety of wrongs perpetrated on the Indians, along with recommendations for reforms.

== Personal life ==
Manypenny married three times. He married Miss Ellis of St. Clairsville. Her brother-in-laws included William Kennon Sr., Hugh J. Jewett, Wilson Shannon and Isaac E. Eaton. He married Emeline Neale (died 1849) of Parkersburg, West Virginia. He married Mary B. Woods, sister of United States Supreme Court Justice William Burnham Woods and General Charles R. Woods. He had at least five children, including Willie, Elizabeth/Bettie, Lewis, Sallie and Burnham W.

Manypenny lived at a three-story house on North Fourth Street in Zanesville. He was a member of the Methodist Church.

In 1880, Manypenny moved to Washington, D.C. Manypenny died on July 15, 1892, at his home in Bowie, Maryland.
