= Forrest Winant =

American actor

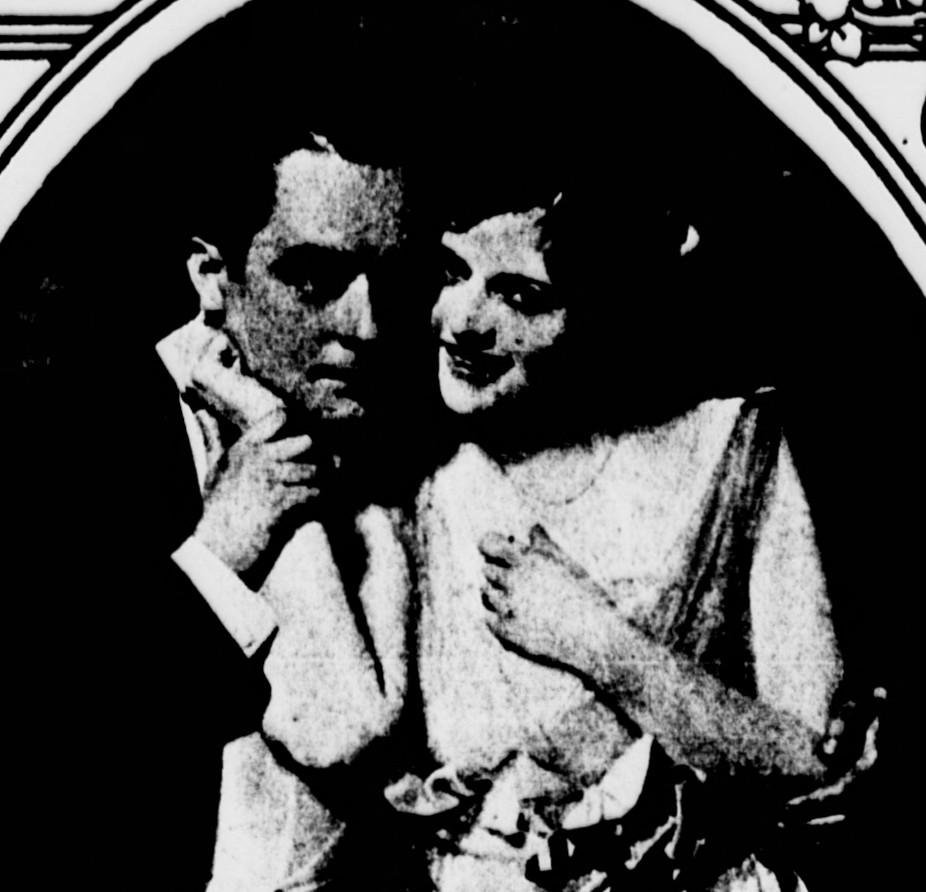
- Forrest Winant (left) with Louise Rutter
- Born: Forrest George Winant; February 21, 1888; New York City, US
- Died: 30 January 1928 (aged 39); Alameda, California, US
- Resting place: Green-Wood Cemetery, Brooklyn, New York (Kings County)
- Other name: Forest Winant
- Occupation: Actor

Forrest Winant (1888–1928) was an American stage and silent screen actor. He usually played amiable juveniles but his work became more cagey and challenging as he aged. He attended the Stevens Institute at Hoboken, New Jersey and participated in some amateur plays before making his professional debut in 1907. He appeared in The Country Boy (1910) with Willette Kershaw, The Family Cupboard (1913) with Irene Fenwick and more famously Kick In(1914) with Jane Grey and John Barrymore. The latter play feature a fight scene on stage between Winant and Barrymore.

In 1912 Winant joined the Summer stock cast at the Elitch Theatre. Theatre owner, Mary Elitch, remembered Winant his way, "Forrest Winant had the title role in Bobby Burnit; this handsome young man was a very special favorite with Denver people. Reference to a review of the Gardens' performance of this week reveals the verdict -- 'A Broadway production, plus!'" Winant later returned to Elitch Theatre in 1915 to star in his Broadway hit, The Country Boy, and followed that up at the theater with the leading role in Anatol, but then left for New York rehearsals of The New Shylock. Winant was elected to The Lambs Theatre Club in 1917.

Winant died at the beginning of 1928 and was buried Greenwood Cemetery Brooklyn New York.

== Work ==
=== Stage ===
- The Coming of Mrs. Patrick (Nov 06, 1907 - Nov 1907)
- The Only Law (Aug 02, 1909 - Sep 11, 1909), as MacAvoy
- The Wedding Day (Dec 10, 1909 - Dec 10, 1909)
- The Country Boy (Aug 30, 1910 - Jan 1911), as Tom Wilson
- Two Little Brides (Apr 23, 1912 - Jun 15, 1912), as Count Boris Rimanow
- Honest Jim Blunt (Sep 16, 1912 - Sep 1912)
- The Gypsy (Nov 14, 1912 - Nov 23, 1912), as Phipps
- The Girl at the Gate (Dec 15, 1912 - ??? ?? 191?)
- Are You a Crook? (May 1, 1913 - May 1913)
- The Family Cupboard (Aug 21, 1913 - Jun 1915)
- After Five (Oct 29, 1913 - Nov 1913), as Ted Ewing
- Kick In (Oct 15, 1914 - Mar 1915), as Charles Cary
- The Song of Songs (Dec 22, 1914 - Jun 1915)
- The Bargain (Oct 06, 1915 - Oct 1915)
- Mrs. Boltay's Daughters (Oct 23, 1915 - Nov 1915)
- Turn to the Right (1916 - 1917), as Joe Bascom
- Some Night! (Sep 23, 1918 - Oct 05, 1918), as John Hardy
- East is West (Dec 25, 1918 - Aug 1920), as Billy Benson
- Our Pleasant Sins (Apr 21, 1919 - May 1919)
- An Exchange of Wives (Sep 26, 1919 - Oct 1919), as William Armitage
- Bucking the Tiger (Dec 28, 1919 - ??? ?? 1920)
- His Chinese Wife (May 17, 1920 - May 1920), as Rodney Sturgis

=== Film ===
- The Brink (1915)
- New York (1916)
- The Iron Heart (1917)
- His Woman (1919)*short
