= Turn to the Right =

1922 film by Rex Ingram

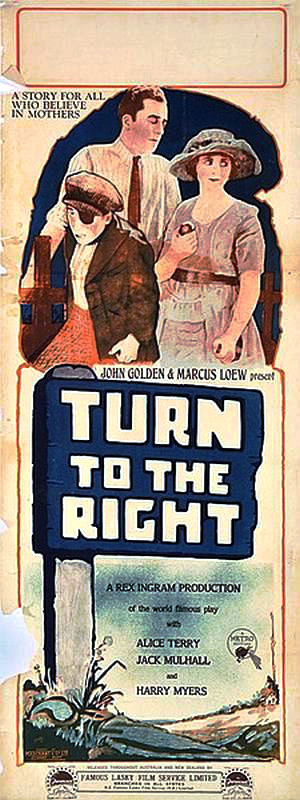
- Australian daybill
- Directed by: Rex Ingram
- Written by: June Mathis (scenario); Mary O'Hara (scenario)
- Based on: Turn to the Right by Winchell Smith and John E. Hazzard
- Starring: Alice Terry; Jack Mulhall
- Cinematography: John F. Seitz
- Production company: Metro Pictures
- Distributed by: Metro Pictures
- Release date: February 12, 1922 (US)
- Running time: 8 reels
- Country: United States
- Language: Silent (English intertitles)

Turn To The Right is an extant 1922 American silent comedy-drama film directed by Rex Ingram and starring Alice Terry. The film is based on a 1916 Broadway play Turn to the Right by Winchell Smith and John E. Hazzard. The adaptation was done by Metro staff scenarists June Mathis and Mary O'Hara, and produced by John Golden and Marcus Loew.

== Plot ==
As described in a film magazine, Joe Bascom (Mulhall), the only son of a poor widow (Knott) in a Connecticut village, is in love with Elsie Tillinger (Terry), daughter of Deacon Tillinger (Connelly), the town's richest and meanest man. The deacon has more ambitious plans for his daughter and Joe, discouraged, leaves home determined to make his way life and return and marry Elsie. She promises to wait for him and together they plan their "dream house." In the city Joe falls in with the race track crowd and finally finds employment with Mr. Morgan (Mayne), a wealthy race horse owner. Joe sends money home frequently and then writes that he has saved $2,000 and will be coming home. Seeing a chance for a final "killing," he wagers the $2,000 on the horses and makes $20,000. Just as he is collecting the money, he is arrested on a charge of stealing the money from his employer, with the thief really being Mr. Morgan's son Lester (Ripley). Joe is sent to the penitentiary and while there meets Gilly (Myers) and Mugsy (Cooper). The three are finally released from prison, and Joe returns home to prevent his mother from being swindled out of her farm by Deacon Tillinger. In this, Joe is assisted by the two crooks who arrive in town by chance via a railroad box car, and they straighten out the widow's financial affairs. The crooks are turned from their ways by the charm of the widow, and they find themselves two sweet country girls. Through fortunate chance and far-fetched business ventures, Joe becomes rich and he and Elsie build their dream house.

== Cast ==
- Alice Terry as Elsie Tillinger
- Jack Mulhall as Joe Bascom
- Harry Myers as Gilly
- George Cooper as Mugsy
- Edward Connelly as Deacon Tillinger
- Lydia Knott as Mrs. Bascom
- Betty Allen as Betty Bascom
- Margaret Loomis as Jessie Strong
- Billy Bletcher as Sammy Martin (credited as William Bletcher)
- Eric Mayne as Mr. Morgan
- Ray Ripley as Lester Morgan

unbilled

- Max Davidson as Pawnbroker
- John George as Pool Hall Patron
- Fred Kelsey as Constable Callahan
- Lon Poff as Townsman
- Dick Sutherland as Pool Hall Patron

== Preservation ==
A copy of Turn to the Right is preserved at the George Eastman House Motion Picture Collection in Rochester, New York.
