= My Own United States =

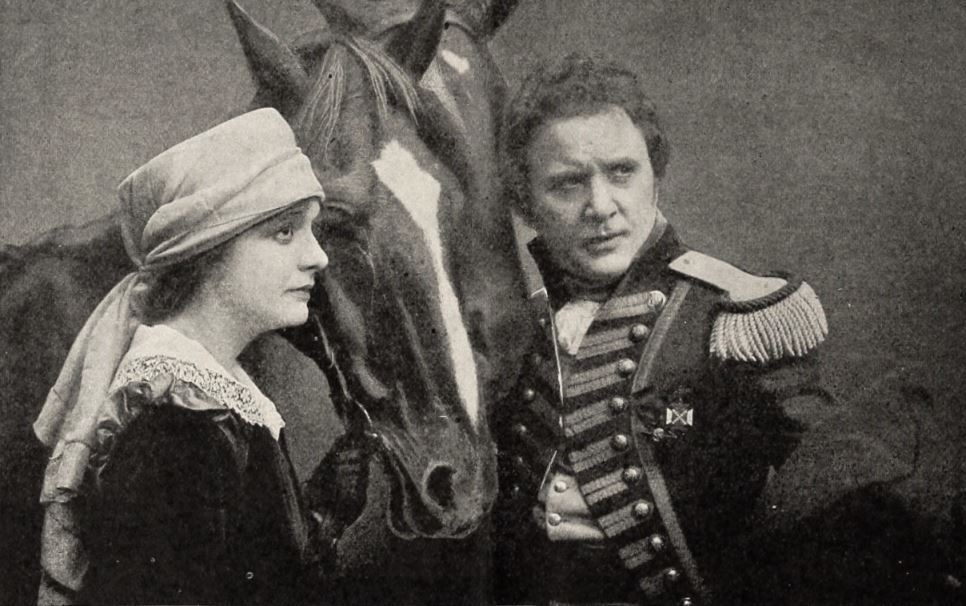
- Still with Anna Lehr and Arnold Daly
- Directed by: John W. Noble
- Written by: Anthony Paul Kelly (scenario)
- Based on: The Man Without a Country (1863 short story) by Edward Everett Hale
- Starring: Arnold Daly
- Cinematography: Herbert Oswald Carleton
- Production company: Frohman Amusement Company
- Distributed by: Metro Pictures
- Release date: April 7, 1918 (US)
- Running time: 8 reels
- Country: United States
- Language: Silent (English intertitles)

My Own United States is a 1918 American silent drama film directed by John W. Noble and starring Arnold Daly, Charles E. Graham, and Duncan McRae. It is based on the 1863 short story "The Man Without a Country" by Edward Everett Hale. It was distributed by Metro Pictures.

The original story, with its strong patriotic theme, was written during the American Civil War in order to increase public support for the Union cause; the film had a like function with regard to World War I, in which the United States was deeply involved at the time.

== Plot ==
As described in a film magazine, Philip Noloan (Daly) is a young American who entertains pacifist views about the American entry into World War I because of his selfish desire to maintain his own comfort. His father, to arouse his duty to his country, tells him the tragic story of his ancestor the first Philip Nolan's (Daly) treason by relating the incidents from the story "The Man Without a Country". His father then tells of incidents from the American Civil War where a later ancestor, also named Philip Nolan (Daly), did all he could to wipe the stain of that treason from the family name. At the conclusion, Philip has become so thrilled by the great deeds of his family that he rises to the occasion and offers his services to his country to make the world safe for democracy.

== Cast ==
- Arnold Daly as Lt. Philip Nolan I, II, III, IV
- Charles E. Graham as Col. Aaron Burr
- Duncan McRae as Gen. Alexander Hamilton
- Sidney Bracey as Capt. Rene Gautier
- P.R. Scammon as President Thomas Jefferson
- Thomas Donnelly as Gen. George Churchill
- John Levering as Justice Col. George Morgan
- Eddie Dunn as Gen. Wilkinson
- Claude Cooper as William Bayard
- William V. Miller as Mr. Van Ness
- Frederick Truesdell as Mr. Pendleton
- F.C. Earle as Andrew Jackson
- Mary Carr as Mrs. Alexander Hamilton
- Shorty Hamilton as Lt. Gaines
- Richard Wangermann as Dr. Hossack
- Fred Herzog as Adm. Stephen Decatur
- Anna Lehr as Agnes Churchill

== Reception ==
Like many American films of the time, My Own United States was subject to cuts by city and state film censorship boards. For example, the Chicago Board of Censors cut, in Reel 3, the shooting in the duel and changed the Lincoln quotation to read "Let us have faith that Right makes Might".

== See also ==
- List of films and television shows about the American Civil War
