= John T. McIntyre =

American writer

John Thomas McIntyre
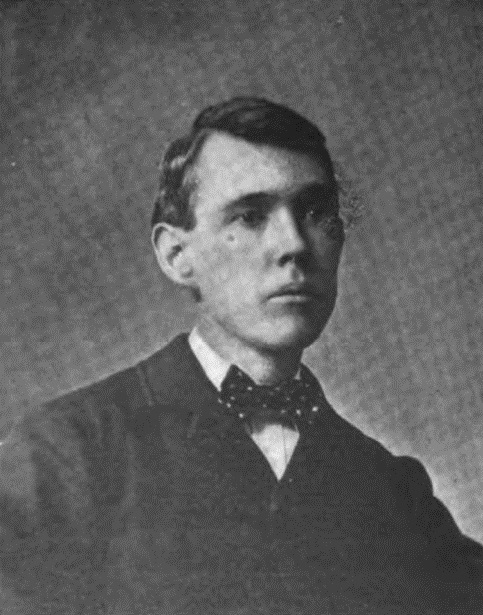
- Born: 26 November 1871; Philadelphia, Pennsylvania
- Died: 21 May 1951 (aged 79); Philadelphia, Pennsylvania
- Occupations: Playwright novelist
- Years active: 1899–1938

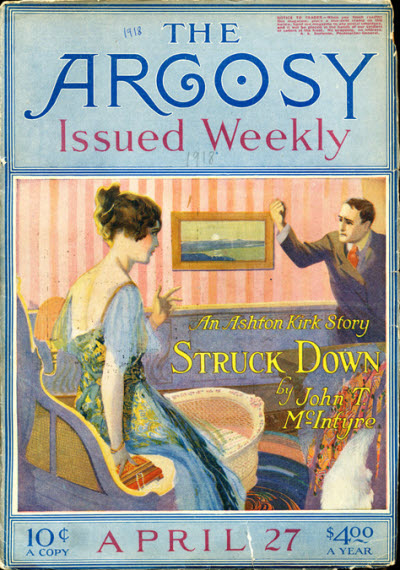
McIntyre's novella "Struck Down", featuring his detective Ashton-Kirk, was serialized in The Argosy in 1918

John Thomas McIntyre (26 November 1871 – 21 May 1951) was an American playwright, and mystery and crime fiction author. McIntyre worked as a freelance journalist in Philadelphia before writing his first novel The Ragged Edge (1902). He was also the writer of the plays Steve (1912) and A Young Man's Fancy (1919). McIntyre's success as a serious novelist were limited and short-lived, and he relied on writing short stories, detective mysteries and juvenile fiction to make a living. He invented the character Ashton-Kirk, a scientific-minded criminologist, and published several books featuring his cases. He also wrote serials for newspapers about a freelance detective named Jerry Mooney. McIntyre's biggest success came from his 1936 novel, Steps Going Down, which was the US entry in the All-Nations Prize Novel Competition and won a prize of $4,000.

== Early life and education ==
McIntyre was born in Philadelphia, Pennsylvania, on 26 November 1871 to Irish immigrants, Sarah Walker (1848–1885) and Patrick McIntyre (circa 1842–1871) (who died the month after he was born). He grew up in the Kensington neighborhood of Philadelphia and attended St. Michael's School (2nd & Jefferson Streets) and then the Harrison Grammar School (Master Street west of 2nd Street, formerly called The West Kensington School). His family consistently shows up in the U.S. Federal Census records as living in Kensington from 1860 to 1800 on Byron Place, a courtyard east of Germantown Avenue below Master Street, then in 1900 John T. McIntyre is enumerated as a boarder at 126 W. Girard Avenue, near Howard Street. He left school after 8th grade when his mother died, was raised by an aunt, and was working full-time by the age of fourteen.

== Career ==
He worked for the stock company of the South Street Standard Theatre, writing a new play each week based on a set of posters produced for the theater's entrance. He also worked as a free-lance journalist for Philadelphia newspapers such as the Philadelphia Press. In 1898, he started writing his first novel, a political drama set in the wards along the Schuylkill River and Philadelphia waterfront, titled The Ragged Edge. The only copy of his manuscript was stolen during an express company robbery and it took him nearly a year to rewrite the book from memory. The book was published by McClure, Phillips in 1902 and is now considered an early example of the urban Irish-American political novel. McIntyre was also known as an authority on the history of the dime novel.

In 1912, Steve, was produced by Arthur Hopkins. In 1919, A Young Man's Fancy, his most well-known play, was produced by George C. Tyler. In 1920, A Young Man's Fancy, was produced by George M. Cohan.

However, McIntyre's successes as a serious novelist were limited and short-lived, and he relied on writing short stories, detective mysteries and juvenile fiction to make a living. He invented Ashton-Kirk, a scientific-minded criminologist, and published several books featuring his cases. He also wrote serials for newspapers about a freelance detective named Jerry Mooney.

Maxwell Perkins took an interest in McIntyre and helped edit his novel of Philadelphia gangsters, Slag, which was published by Scribners in 1926, but it proved too far ahead of popular interest in hard-boiled crime novels.

McIntyre's greatest success and fame came from his 1936 novel, Steps Going Down, which was selected as the United States entry in the All-Nations Prize Novel Competition. Although it did not win the full competition, its selection won McIntyre an award of $4,000 in cash and gained prominent notices for the book in most of the major literary magazines. Warner Brothers, which sponsored the competition, considered it for filming but declined it in the end. Steps Going Down tells the story of two men trying to evade the police and others as they move through a series of cheap lodgings in the poorer neighborhoods around Philadelphia, encountering a variety of crooks, prostitutes, addicts, zealots, and other characters. Carl van Doren wrote of the book, "There is hardly a page without an act, thought, or speech which is as natural as experience."

McIntyre tried to build upon this success with his 1937 novel, Ferment, about union corruption, and Signing Off, his 1938 novel about Italian-American gangsters, but he had to fall back upon writing cheap fiction for newspapers and magazines. He placed fewer and fewer pieces as the 1940s wore on, and he was forced to sell off his collection of dime novels and rely upon the charity of his friends in the last years before his death.

== Bibliography ==
=== Mystery novels ===
- In The Dead of Night (1908)
- Ashton-Kirk Investigator (1910)
- Ashton-Kirk Secret Agent (1912)
- Ashton-Kirk Special Detective (1914)
- Ashton-Kirk Criminologist (1918)
- The Museum Murder (1929)
- Mooney Moves Around (1939)
- Death at Dakar (1942)
- Ninth Floor: Middle City Tower. A Jerry Mooney Story (1943)
- Death Strikes at Heron House. A Jerry Mooney Story (1944)

=== Plays ===
- Hearts of Men: A Drama in Four Acts (1899)
- In the Toils: A Melodrama in Five Acts (1905)
- The Bowery Night School: A Vaudeville Sketch (1906)
- The Swell Cracksman, a Vaudeville Sketch (1906)
- One Girl in a Thousand (1910)
- The Dime Lunch: A Vaudeville Sketch ... (1911)
- "Genius and the Crowd;": A Comedy in Three Acts (1920)
- Sketches, Skits and Stunts (1922)

=== Juvenile fiction ===
- The Young Continentals at Monmouth (1912)
- In Kentucky with Daniel Boone (1913)

=== Mainstream novels ===
- The Ragged Edge: A Tale of Ward Life & Politics (1902)
- With Fighting Jack Barry (1907)
- The Street Singer (1908)
- Blowing Weather (1923)
- Young Man's Fancy, An Easter Fantasy (1925)
- Shot Towers (1926)
- Slag (1927)
- Stained Sails (1928)
- Drums in the Dawn (1932)
- Steps Going Down (1936)
- Ferment (1937)
- Signing Off (1938)

== See also ==
- An Affair of Three Nations (1915 film adaption)
- The Menace of the Mute (1915 film adaption)
- The House of Fear (1915 film adaption)
