= Florence O'Denishawn =

American actress and model (1897–1991)

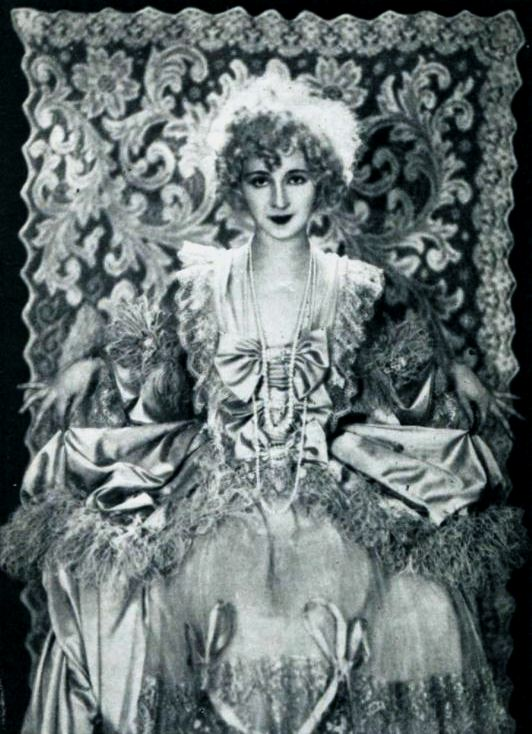
- Florence O'Denishawn, from a 1922 publication
- Born: Florence Andrews; July 21, 1897; Shreveport, Louisiana, U.S.
- Died: March 15, 1991 (aged 93); New York City, New York, U.S.
- Occupations: Dancer, Actress

Florence O'Denishawn (born Florence Andrews, July 21, 1897 – March 15, 1991), was an American actress and model, and one of the first group of dancers associated with the Denishawn school.

== Early life ==
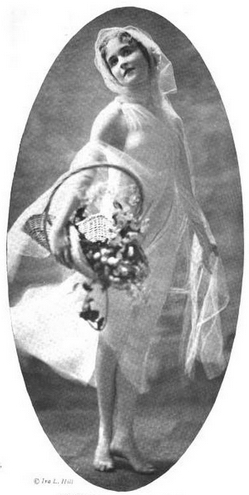
Florence O'Denishawn, from a 1918 publication.

Florence Andrews was born in Shreveport, Louisiana, the daughter of a banker. She studied dance with Ted Shawn and Ruth St. Denis in their "Denishawn" school in California. When she became a professional dancer, she wanted to be billed as "Florence of Denishawn", but the name became "Florence O'Denishawn" in a printing error, and she continued working under that version.

== Career ==
O'Denishawn's stage credits included Hitchy-Koo (1918-1920), Ziegfeld Follies of 1921, Rose Briar (1922), Music Box Revue (1923), and Honeymoon Lane (1926). Of her appearance in Music Box Revue, critic George Jean Nathan noted that her "umbilical revelations are so familiar by this time that one wishes she would put on a dress." She was cast in two silent films, Lawful Larceny (1923) and Monsieur Beaucaire (1924), in the latter dancing with Rudolph Valentino. In 1925, she headlined a vaudeville shows in New York and Baltimore, with dancers Nelson Snow and Charles Columbus. She toured with Snow and Columbus in 1927 and 1930

O'Denishawn posed for photographer Nickolas Muray, and for sculptor Harriet Whitney Frishmuth. She posed for two bronze statues by Frishmuth, named "Papillon" and "Scherzo", which were commissioned by Wilbur Foshay for Foshay Tower.

O'Denishawn gave a celebrity endorsement to a brand of footcare plasters. In 1926, she performed at a benefit show for the Episcopal Actors' Guild. In 1927 she performed in another benefit show, dancing at a midnight cabaret to raise funds for the Association for the Aid of Crippled Children. She danced for a cause again in 1930, at a variety show to benefit the Bide-A-Wee Home for Animals.

O'Denishawn embarked upon the study of aviation in 1927, saying "there is nothing that can beat an aeroplane for grace." From the late 1930s into the 1950s, O'Denishawn worked in shops, running her own store in Greenwich Village, and as head of the lingerie department at Porter's department store on Madison Avenue.

== Opinions ==
O'Denishawn spoke about "prudery" and artistic expression, saying "There is no mental health in a nation that is afraid to trust itself in the presence of the nude." In 1928, O'Denishawn decried popular dances like the Charleston or the Black Bottom with blatant racism, saying "Dances that are admittedly of a barbaric origin — the shimmy, Charleston, and others — are proving an insidious evil in the way of depriving our American women of their natural grace and movement," further explaining that "Negro anatomy is not the same as ours. The pose of the knees, the modelling of the hips, the line of the feet makes those dances right for the Negro" but not for white dancers.

== Personal life ==
O'Denishawn died in 1991, aged 93 years, in New York. There is a file of her correspondence with Ted Shawn, in the Jacob's Pillow Dance Festival archives in Becket, Massachusetts.
