= Louise Rutter =

American actress

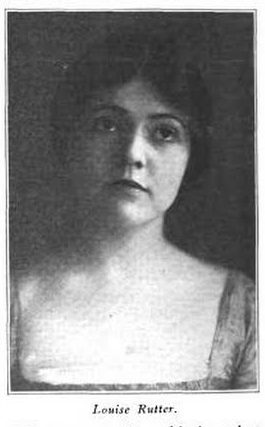
Louise Rutter, from a 1915 publication.

Louise Rutter (born September 15, 1887 – died before 1972) was an American actress of the stage and screen.

== Early life ==
Louise Rutter was born on September 15, 1887, in Baltimore, Maryland, although some sources give Philadelphia as her birthplace.

== Career ==
Rutter acted on stage from her youth, in The Bonnie Brier Bush, The College Widow, The Lion and the Mouse, and The Heir to the Hoorah. On Broadway, she had roles in such shows as Secret Service, The Devil, Held by the Enemy, The Sins of Society (1909), Know Thyself (1909), Mid-Channel (1910), Sherlock Holmes (1910), Passers-by (1911), A Rich Man's Son (1912), Moloch (1915), Turn to the Right (1916-1917), The Man of the Hour, and A Successful Calamity.

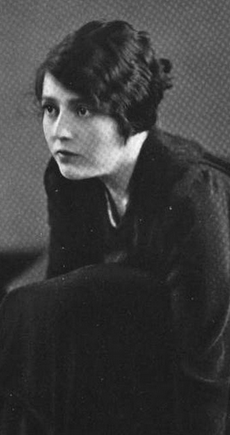
Louise Rutter, from a 1916 publication.

Rutter appeared in three silent films in 1915: Milestones of Life (Thanhouser), An Affair of Three Nations (Pathé), and The Menace of the Mute (Pathé). The latter two films were part of a detective series based on stories by John T. McIntyre. "I realize that the motion picture will soon take the place of the speaking stage," she said at the time. "Motion pictures are just beginning. Imagine, then, what the future has in store, figuring on this basis."

== Personal life ==
Louise Rutter married Charles Perkins, an English brewer, in 1911 and had 3 children. In 1972, a Sherlock Holmes deerstalker cap and other memorabilia from the career of actor William Gillette were donated to the State of Connecticut for display at Gillette Castle, by Doreen Carlos-Perkins, daughter of Louise Rutter. Rutter had starred with Gillette in several plays, and played "Alice Faulkner" alongside his famous rendition of Sherlock Holmes.
