= Mortimer Halpern =

American actor and stage manager

- Born: Mortimer V. Halpern; May 12, 1909; New York City, U.S.
- Died: January 3, 2006 (aged 96); New York City, U.S.
- Other name: Morty Halpern
- Occupations: Stage and production manager, actor
- Spouse(s): Jennifer Howard (m. 1946; div. 19??); Sherry Lambert

Mortimer V. Halpern (May 12, 1909 – January 3, 2006) was an American actor and long-time production stage manager who worked on over 45 Broadway plays in a theatre career that spanned some 60 years.

== Life and career ==
Mortimer "Morty" Halpern was born in The Bronx, New York, to Jewish immigrants, Harry and Rose Halpern. His father came from Russia and was employed in New York as a garment cutter. Halpern's mother was born in Austria and would later work as a sewing machine operator at a dress factory after the death of her husband. Over his early years Halpern lived with his mother in the Bronx working as a salesman for a pharmaceutical house.

He first appeared on Broadway as Murray Codner in Kith and Kin, a three-act play by Wallace A. Manheimer that disappeared after its May 13, 1930, debut at the Waldorf Theatre. Halpern's return to Broadway came fourteen years later as a performer (chorus) and assistant stage manager with Walter Kerr's 1944–1945 musical revue Sing Out, Sweet Land, which was staged at the International Theatre on West 59th Street with Alfred Drake and Burl Ives. The following year Halpern was the stage manager for the Theatre Guild Shakespeare Repertory Company where he met and subsequently married actress Jennifer Howard, the daughter of Sidney Howard and Clare Eames. Their marriage ended in divorce sometime before Howard remarried in the summer of 1950. Halpern later wed the actress and Broadway stage manager, Sherry Lambert.

As production stage manager Halpern worked on a number of Broadway hits, including Leonard Bernstein's Peter Pan with Jean Arthur and Boris Karloff, Leonard Sillman's New Faces of 1952 and New Faces of 1956, The Disenchanted with Jason Robards, Sr., Jason Robards, Jr. and George Grizzard, The Andersonville Trial with George C. Scott, Rhinoceros with Zero Mostel, I Had a Ball with Buddy Hackett and Richard Kiley, Purlie with Cleavon Little and Sherman Hemsley, In Praise of Love with Julie Harris and Rex Harrison and Ma Rainey's Black Bottom with Charles S. Dutton and Theresa Merritt. Halpern's last Broadway production was the 1990 play that was later made into the film with the same title, The Cemetery Club.

Over his career Halpern spent 23 off-seasons as stage manager for Guy Lombardo's summer musicals staged at the Jones Beach Theater in Wantagh, and due to a 1958 rule change, Halpern became the first stage manager to serve as an Actors' Equity representative during a 1959 production of Song of Norway.

Halpern died at age 96 in New York and was survived by his wife, Sherry Lambert. At the time of his death Halpern was considered the dean of Broadway stage managers.
