= Gerald Fielding =

British actor (1902–1956)

- Born: 6 July 1902; Darjeeling, British Raj
- Died: 3 June 1956 (aged 53); Los Angeles, United States of America
- Education: Cambridge University
- Occupation: Actor Radio Executive
- Spouse: Barbara Macleod (m. 1931; died 1940)
- Relatives: Xan Fielding (nephew); Vivien Leigh (first cousin)

Gerald Claude Feilmann, known as Gerald Fielding (6 July 1902 – 3 June 1956) was a British-Indian actor.

== Early life ==
Fielding was born in Darjeeling, India to Percy Feilmann and Mary Patricia Yackjee. He was the fifth of eight children. Percy Feilmann changed the family surname from Feilmann to Fielding in 1918 because of its German association. The Feilmanns were originally Jews from Hamburg, while Mary was half-Armenian and half-Irish. That same year, Gerald's eldest sister Mary Gertrude died giving birth to the future author and adventurer Xan Fielding, who Percy and Mary subsequently adopted. Actress Vivien Leigh was his first cousin, as their mothers were sisters.

In 1920, the entire family moved to Nice, where they resided in the newly built Château Fielding. He moved to England to study at Cambridge University but returned after his father's death in 1925. After his mother's death in 1932, was made guardian to his youngest siblings, Lawrence and Patricia, as well as his nephew Xan Fielding.

== Career ==
He was discovered in France by director Rex Ingram, who saw him as the natural successor to Ramon Novarro and Rudolph Valentino because of his swarthy skin and black hair. Because of his Armenian heritage and his ability to speak in a convincing Indian accent, he was cast as an Arab in The Garden of Allah (1927). His brother Claude Fielding (born 1904, later known as Paul C. Fielding) also appeared in the film. However, while Gerald Fielding was able to appear in many films for the next two decades, Claude failed to secure any further roles. Their cousin Vivien Leigh gave him $500 in 1941 "because he was enduring an awful time."

In 1928, he played Bobbie in The Three Passions, which featured Alice Terry (his future lover) and a teenage Merle Oberon as an extra.

Gerald married Barbara MacLeod, six years his junior, on 2 September 1931. Macleod struggled with alcoholism and committed suicide in front of Fielding on 27 May 1940. Later that year, Fielding became a naturalized American. In the 1950s, he had a relationship with Alice Terry, the widow of his former director. He died in 1956.

== Filmography ==
| Year | Title | Role | Notes |
|---|---|---|---|
| 1926 | The Magician | Dancing Faun | Directed by Rex Ingram |
| 1927 | The Garden of Allah | Batouch | Directed by Rex Ingram |
| 1928 | The Three Passions | Bobbie | Directed by Rex Ingram |
| 1928 | Morgane, the Enchantress | Fanch | |
| 1928 | The Orchid Dancer | Doulaze | |
| 1929 | L'évadée | Olivier Lambert | |
| 1931 | Just a Gigolo | Tony | |
| 1931 | I Take This Woman | Bill Wentworth | |
| 1932 | The Night Club Lady | Guy Everett | Uncredited |
| 1933 | Goodbye Love | Dunwoodie - Sandra's Beau | |
| 1934 | The Scarlet Empress | Lt. Dmitri | Directed by Josef von Sternberg |
| 1935 | The Price of a Song | Michael Hardwicke | |
| 1936 | The Man Behind the Mask | Harrah | |
| 1939 | The Jones Family in Hollywood | Movie Studio Actor | Uncredited |
| 1939 | A Chump at Oxford | Student Brown | |
| 1940 | New Moon | Party Guest | Uncredited |
| 1940 | Arise, My Love | Uniformed English Correspondent | Uncredited |
| 1941 | They Met in Bombay | Officer | Uncredited |
| 1942 | Captains of the Clouds | Flight Lt. Holt | Uncredited |
| 1944 | Our Hearts Were Young and Gay | Deck Officer | Uncredited |
| 1947 | Forever Amber | Cavalier | Uncredited |
| 1947 | It Had to Be You | Stuyvesant Peabody Keyes | Uncredited, (final film role) |
