= John Ery Coleman =

American artist (1923–1993)

- Born: October 23, 1923; Hamburg, Germany
- Died: April 25, 1993 (aged 69); Los Angeles, California, U.S.
- Occupation: Artist
- Spouse: Jennifer Howard (m. 1972)

John Ery Coleman (October 28, 1923 – April 25, 1993) was an American artist active during the latter half of the twentieth century.

== Life and career ==
John Ery Coleman was born in Hamburg, Germany, the younger of two sons raised by Nathaniel Ragsdale Coleman, Sr., and the former Frances Esders. His father was a tobacco merchant from Virginia who, after serving with the American Expeditionary Forces during World War I, set up a tobacco brokerage house in Hamburg. Coleman's mother was a London-born lyric soprano who later sang principal roles with the Dresden opera.

Coleman's brother, Nat, Jr., attended Rocklands Home School, a preparatory school in England not far from Hastings, and later the Abbotsholme School in rural Derbyshire along the Staffordshire border. Since the two brothers were less than a year apart in age, it is possible they were enrolled together.

Coleman's family attended the 1936 Summer Olympics in Berlin, and viewed Jesse Owens win his four gold medals. Coleman and his brother spent several summers in the United States in the late 1930s before leaving Europe for a final time on the eve of World War II. Coleman enlisted after a year's college as a private in the U.S. Army on April 3, 1943, at Fort Bragg, North Carolina.

After the war years, Coleman studied art in Mexico City under Professor Isidoro Ocampo and in Paris with Johnny Friedlaender. His works were shown in a number of group exhibitions and at solo exhibitions held at art studios in New York City; Los Angeles; Columbia, South Carolina; Knoxville, Tennessee; and Santa Monica, California.

Coleman married Jennifer Howard on July 28, 1972, in Los Angeles. Howard was a former actress, the daughter of Sidney Howard and Clare Eames, who later became a watercolor and acrylic artist. Both Coleman and Howard died in 1993.
