= Jennifer Howard =

Jennifer Howard may refer to:

- Jennifer Howard (actress) (1925–1993), American stage and film actress
- Jennifer Howard (Canadian politician), member of the Legislative Assembly of Manitoba
- Jennifer Howard (Australian politician), member of the Queensland Legislative Assembly
