= Pluciński =

Pluciński (feminine: Plucińska; plural: Plucińscy) is a Polish surname. Notable people with the surname include:

- Andrzej Pluciński (1915–1963), Polish basketball player
- Bolesław Kamil Pluciński (1854–1932), Polish-French actor known professionally as Armand Dutertre
- Tadeusz Pluciński (1926–2019), Polish actor
