= Jennifer Howard (actress) =

American actress (1925–1993)

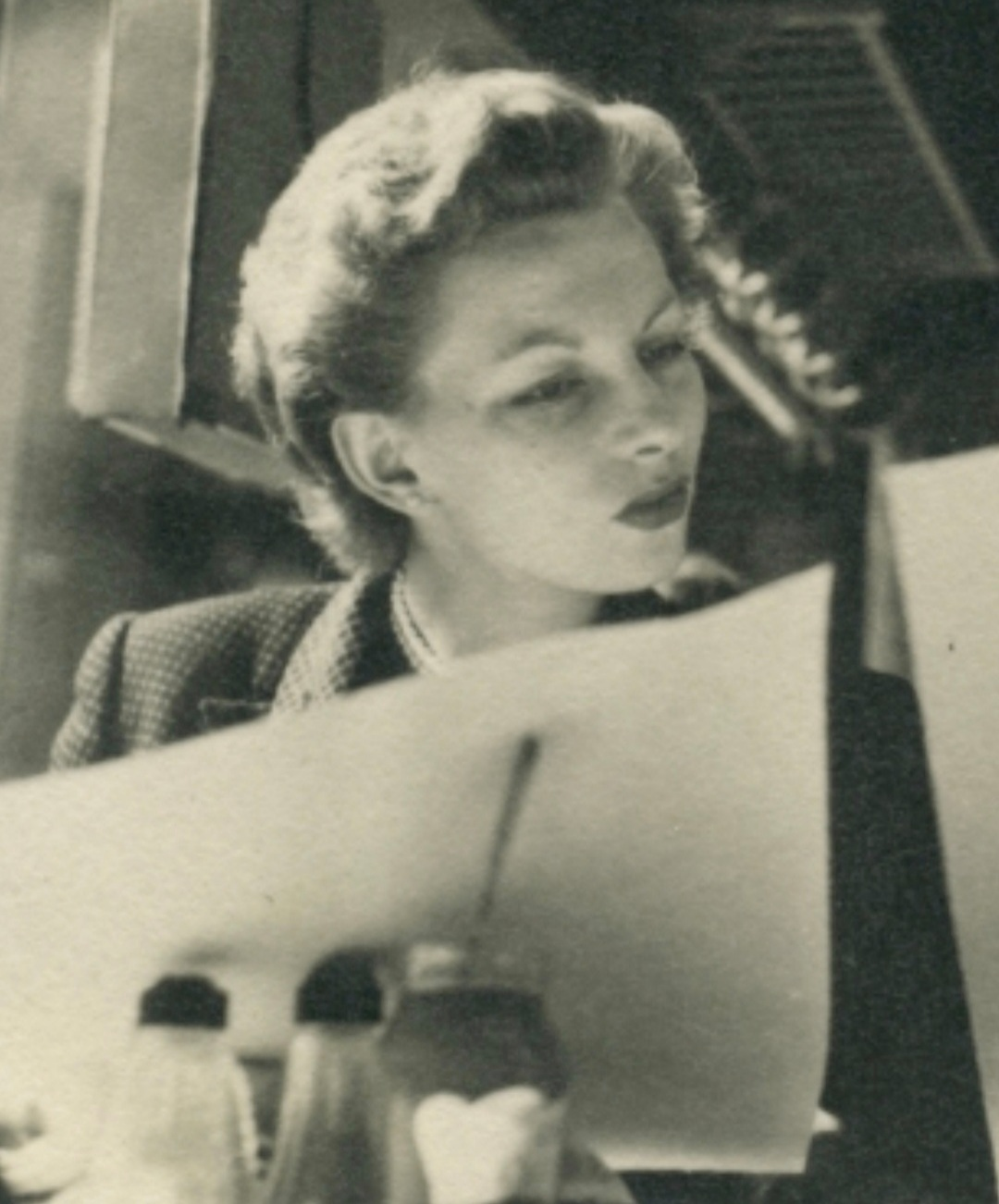
- Howard in 1952
- Born: Clare Jenness Howard; March 23, 1925; New York City, U.S.
- Died: December 14, 1993 (aged 68); Los Angeles, California, U.S.
- Occupation: Actress
- Years active: 1948–1980
- Spouse(s): Mortimer Halpern (m. 1946; div. 19??) Samuel Goldwyn Jr. (m. 1950; div. 1968) John Ery Coleman (m. 1972; died 1993)
- Children: Tony Goldwyn; John Goldwyn
- Parent(s): Sidney Howard; Clare Eames
- Relatives: Emma Eames (grandaunt); William T. Hamilton (great-grandfather); Descendants of Robert Coe

Jennifer Howard (born Clare Jenness Howard; March 23, 1925 – December 14, 1993) was an American stage and film actress active between the mid-1940s and early 1960s. She appeared in a number of classic television shows during the American Golden Age of Television and was also an accomplished watercolor and acrylic artist. She was the daughter of the playwright and screenwriter Sidney Howard and first wife of Hollywood producer Samuel Goldwyn Jr.

== Early life ==
Clare Jenness Howard was born on March 23, 1925, in New York City, the daughter of dramatist Sidney Howard and actress Clare Eames. She was a grandniece of the American opera singer Emma Eames and great-granddaughter of William Thomas Hamilton, a governor of Maryland.

In 1930, Howard's mother died in London, and the following year, her father married Polly Damrosch, a daughter of the German-American conductor and composer Walter Damrosch. Howard's father died nine years later in a tractor mishap on their farm near Tyringham, Massachusetts.

Howard graduated from Milton Academy and attended classes at Barnard College, and in May 1946, she married Mortimer Halpern, a one-time actor known as Morty Halpern, who became a Broadway stage and production manager. At the time of their marriage, Howard was an actress with the Theatre Guild Shakespeare Repertory Company where Halpern was the stage manager. The marriage was short-lived, and in August 1950, she married film producer Samuel Goldwyn, Jr. The couple had four children, including business executive Francis Goldwyn, actor Tony Goldwyn, and studio executive John Goldwyn. This marriage also ended in divorce, some 18 years later.

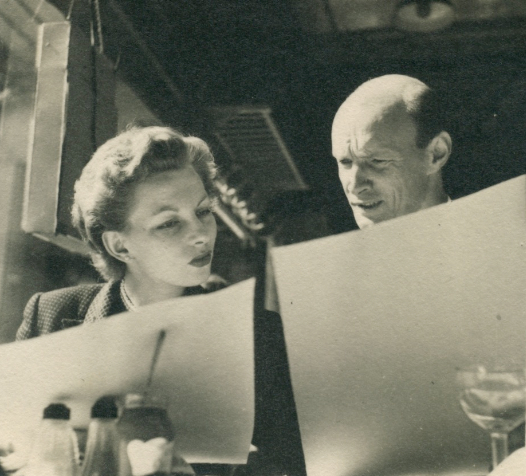
Jennifer Howard in 1952 with screenwriter William Templeton

== Career ==
Howard began in theatre, appearing in four Broadway productions during the latter half of the 1940s. She played the 1st lady in a revival of Shakespeare's A Winter's Tale at the Cort Theatre between January and February 1946. She was Penny in The Fatal Weakness by George Kelly, which ran for 119 performances over the 1947–1948 season at Manhattan's Royale Theatre (today the Bernard B. Jacobs Theatre). In September 1947, Howard became one of the founding members of the Actors Studio. One year later, she played Vanilla in the short-lived Studio production Sundown Beach by Bessie Breuer at the Belasco Theatre. In November of the following year, Howard played Louise Ulmer in Love Me Long, a comedy by Doris Frankel, a run that lasted about a fortnight at the 48th Street Theatre. Love Me Long was directed by Brock Pemberton who also directed the 1921 play Swords, which began her parents' Broadway careers.

Howard played The Nurse in Portrait of a Madonna from the play by Tennessee Williams, the first teleplay produced by the early television series Actors Studio, airing on September 26, 1948. During the late 1950s, she appeared in numerous American television series: In Cheyenne, she played the role of Ellen Ellwood in the episode "Land Beyond Law" (1957); in the Suspicion episode "Meeting in Paris" (1958), she played the mayor's secretary; in the Alfred Hitchcock Presents episode "The Foghorn" (1958), she played a nun; in The Thin Man episode "Jittery Juror" (1958), she played Joyce; in The Twilight Zone episode "Eye of the Beholder" (1960), she played a nurse; and in the Checkmate episode "Laugh Till I Die" (1961), she played Corinne Marsdon. She appears in five episodes of the Perry Mason series—as Lorraine Selkirk Jennings in "The Case of the Deadly Toy" (1959), Judith Thatcher in "The Case of Paul Drake's Dilemma" (1959), Milly Nash in "The Case of the Envious Editor" (1961), Winifred Dunbrack in "The Case of the Renegade Refugee" (1961), and Madelon Haines Shelby in "The Case of the Fickle Filly" (1962).

Howard appeared in at least four films: Return to Peyton Place (1961) as Mrs. Jackman (uncredited), All Fall Down (1962) as Myra (uncredited), House of Women (1962) as Addie Gates, and The Chapman Report (1962) as Grace Waterton. She died of lung cancer in 1993 at age 68.

== Later life ==
On July 28, 1972, Howard married the American artist John Ery Coleman in Los Angeles.

== Selected filmography ==
- Alfred Hitchcock Presents (1958) (Season 3 Episode 24: "The Foghorn") as Nun
