= Hearts Are Trumps (1920 American film) =

1920 film by Rex Ingram

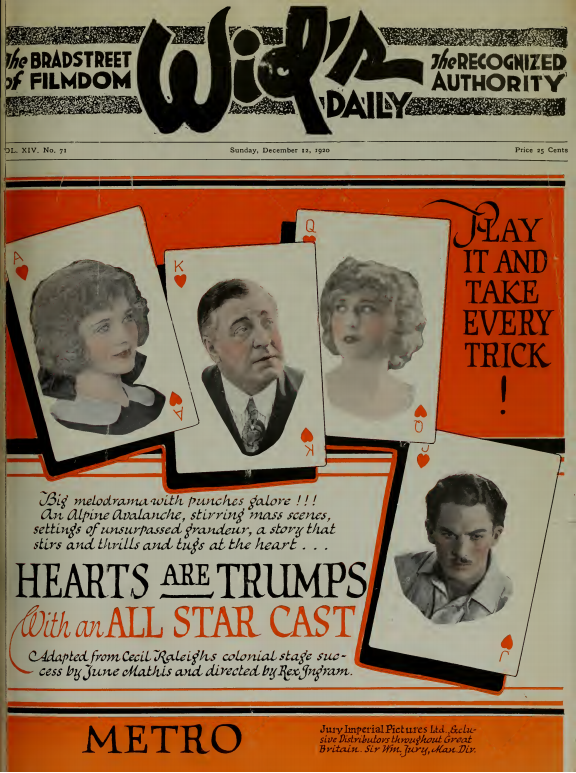
- Advertising for Hearts Are Trumps from The Film Daily
- Directed by: Rex Ingram
- Written by: June Mathis; Cecil Raleigh (play)
- Starring: Winter Hall; Frank Brownlee; Alice Terry
- Cinematography: John F. Seitz
- Edited by: Grant Whytock
- Production company: Metro Pictures
- Distributed by: Metro Pictures
- Release date: December 13, 1920
- Country: United States
- Languages: Silent; English intertitles

Hearts are Trumps is a 1920 American silent drama film directed by Rex Ingram and starring Winter Hall, Frank Brownlee and Alice Terry.

== Cast ==
- Winter Hall as Lord Altcar
- Frank Brownlee as Michael Wain
- Alice Terry as Dora Woodberry
- Francelia Billington as Lady Winifred
- Joseph Kilgour as Lord Burford
- Brinsley Shaw as Maurice Felden
- Thomas Jefferson as Henry Dyson
- Norman Kennedy as John Gillespie
- Edward Connelly as Brother Christopher, the Abbot of St. Bernard
- Bull Montana as Jake
- Howard Crampton as Butler

== Production ==
To obtain snow scenes, Hearts Are Trumps was partially shot on location at Huntington Lake.

== Bibliography ==
- Goble, Alan. The Complete Index to Literary Sources in Film. Walter de Gruyter, 1999.
