= Emilio de Gogorza =

American opera singer (1872–1949)

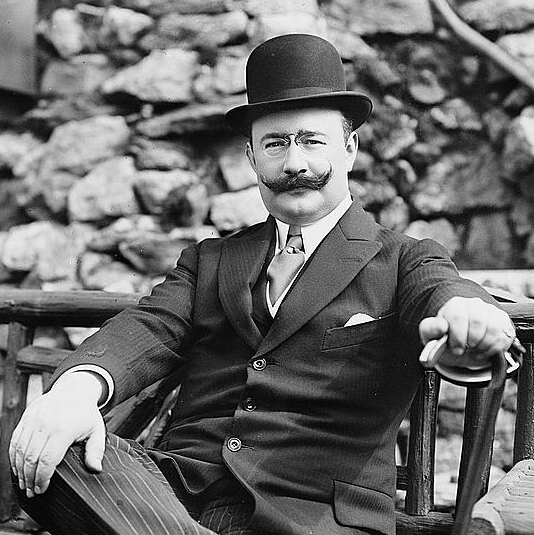
Emilio de Gogorza

Emilio Eduardo de Gogorza (May 29, 1872 – May 10, 1949) was an American lyric baritone singer.

== Biography ==
Emilio de Gogorza was born in Brooklyn, New York, and brought up and trained musically in Spain. He returned to the USA in his early 20s. He sang in many languages, including French, Italian and English, as well as Spanish. Owing to pronounced near-sightedness, he did not appear on the operatic stage but became a renowned concert and recital artist instead.

Gogorza recorded prodigiously for the Victor Talking Machine Company. His records display the intelligence and sensitivity of his singing, as well as a polished vocal technique. Victor released many recordings not only under his own name but under various aliases such as Carlos Francisco and Herbert Goddard. He used these pseudonyms for records issued on Victor's lower priced black label instead of the premium priced Red Seal label for which he usually recorded. He also worked early A&R jobs for Victor. He helped persuade other well-known opera singers to record for the company, including Enrico Caruso who signed with the label in 1904. Gogorza and Caruso made only one published recording together, a Spanish song entitled "A la luz de la luna" ("By the light of the moon") in 1918. In 1928, Gogorza recorded the song again, with tenor Tito Schipa.

During this time he also was a professor of voice and music for the Curtis Institute of Music in Philadelphia. Among his students was Wilbur Evans who in December 1927 won the first Atwater Kent National Radio Audition, winning first prize out of 50,000 contestants. Evans would become a well-known baritone on Broadway and radio, as well as co-starring in London's South Pacific opposite Mary Martin. In retirement, his pupils included composer Samuel Barber and Philadelphia music critic Max de Schauensee.

Gogorza died in 1949 of lung cancer in New York City, aged 76.

== Marriages ==
De Gogorza was first married on 29 October 1896 in Manhattan, New York, New York, to Elsa "Elsie" Neumoegen; (daughter of N. Berthold and Rebecca [Livingstone] Neumoegen). On his marriage certificate; Emilio listed his parents as Julis Antonio De Gogorza and Francisca Navarette. His occupation was listed as a "Singer" in the 1900 Census.

In 1911, De Gorgoza married Emma Eames, the American soprano with whom he toured and also recorded duets for Victor. They were divorced in 1936.

== Partial Discography ==
A List of 78 RPM recordings by de Gogorza is available at the Diaz Ayala Collection at Florida International University (FIU)

- A la luz de la luna (with Enrico Caruso) (1918) - Victrola 64847
- A la luz de la luna (with Tito Schipa) (1928) - Victor 3049
- Absent - Victrola 64628
- All the World Will be Jealous of Me - Victrola 64688
- Beauty's Eyes - Victor 64372
- Benvenuto Cellini De l'Art, Splendeur Inmortelle (1909) - Victor 141
- Blue Bells of Scotland (1908) - Victrola 590
- Caballero de Gracia - Victor 4293
- Carlos Francisco - Victor B-417
- Carmen Chanson du Toréador (1906) - Victrola 88178
