= Leonti Planskoy =

Leonti Petrovitch Planskoy (c.1900–1986) was a Russian Empire-born photographer, cinematographer and inventor active in France, the United Kingdom and the United States from the late 1920s to 1970s and was naturalised as a UK citizen in 1950.

== Biography ==
Leonti Petrovitch Planskoy, alias Leonti Marcovitch Planskoy, also known as Lee or less commonly as Lonya, was of obscure origin, but played significant roles in cinema of the 1920s and 1930s and in photography in the 1950s.

== Inventor ==
Planskoy was an inventor of technologies relating to cinematography and photography and registered patents in France, UK and USA for production of composite motion pictures (1930); for the production of composite images (1935); photographic development to a predetermined value of contrast (1938)–in effect, an automated means of 'development by inspection'; and for the production of images which are geometrically equivalent, applicable to photography and to cinematography (1940) to aid in producing seamless special effects montage.

He was an active innovator during the transition from silent to early sound film, and earliest mentions of him are listings as camera operator on Abel Gance’s Napoleon (1927), and as first assistant director on Marcel L'Herbier’s Le diable au coeur (1928). A 1927 SMPE directory entry places him at "Riviera Studios, Harry Lachman Productions, Inc. St. Andre de Nice" (Saint-André-de-la-Roche), France then in the 1929 issue of the same directory his address is given as c/o Q.R.S. Music Co., 333 N. Michigan Ave., Chicago, Illinois, then the following year shows him registered at Aleje Jerozolimskie 83, Warsaw, Poland.

Variety magazine in 1929 notes his work on colour photography and in another issue refers to his sound recording techniques. Irving Thalberg negotiated with Planskoy to purchase his five way projection system as an improvement over the Dunning process. Director Michael Powell, in his first volume of autobiography, A Life in Movies, relates that he met Planskoy in Nice as a technical expert, and how both worked there for the Irish-American filmmaker Rex Ingram; Planskoy having sent him a letter in early 1930 informing of a potential role in a production based on a play by T.W. Robertson called Caste. He notes that Jerome Jackson, the American lawyer and would-be producer of Caste at United Artists, London, had been sponsoring Planskoy's “camera-trick experiments”, thus also referring to his montage invention for the production of composite images. Roy Pomeroy is noted as working for RKO “alongside the innovative cameraman Leo Planskoy”, probably on Son of Kong (1933) By 1945 Planskoy was an engineer at Blattnerphone.

== Post-war ==
Planskoy moved from France to 45 Tavistock Court, in Bloomsbury, near Russell Square station, London and in 1950 became naturalised as a British citizen He worked for a time as a photojournalist with Picture Post where staff photographer and camera mechanic, Carl Sutton (1923 - 1996) remembers him as “Doctor Leonti Planskoy” “who could speak nine languages”, was well-traveled, and who had “studied optics and colour in Germany, France and with Warner Brothers in Hollywood”.

== Photography exhibitions ==
During his time at Picture Post and before it folded in 1957, Planskoy produced pictures that were included by curator of photography Edward Steichen in Postwar European Photography at the Museum of Modern Art, New York, 26 May to 23 August 1953; the heartbreaking “At the death bed of a child, La Coruña” of 1951, and lively “Dancer, Rio de Janeiro” (1952), the latter described in the MoMA press release: “Tender, gentle dancing movements are contrasted with frenzied frantic dancing in a series of photographs of couples in South America by Leonti Planskoy who now lives in England and is being shown in this country for the first time.”

In 1955, in the exhibition The Family of Man, also curated by Steichen, Brazil is represented by three carnival images taken by Planskoy and the only one by a Brazilian photographer; the naturalized Pierre Verger, originally from France, is a photo of Bahia erroneously identified as being made in Peru. The exhibition was seen by 9 million visitors during its world tour.

Leonsky was included in a third exhibition at MoMA; Photographs from the Museum Collection, shown 26 November 1958 to 18 January 1959. His photojournalism of the 1950s was commissioned by periodicals including Geographical Magazine, the South African Drum, Photo-Monde, Travel and Camera, Sciences et Voyages, Camera, Chicago Review, The Photographic Journal amongst others.

== Late career ==
In 1969 Planskoy, then working at Imperial College, presented at the AIC International Colo(u)r Association Color Meeting "Color 69" in Stockholm, where he is listed as 'Dr Leonti Planosky', and in the 1970s was working on a method of evaluating process ink colours at the College in a research project also sponsored by a French E.R.A. member, Imprimerie Chaix-Desfosses-Néogravure.

Planskoy died in London in 1986.
