= Armand Dutertre =

Film & theatre actor

Bolesław Kamil Pluciński, known professionally as Armand Dutertre (17 July 1854 in Lublin – 31 May 1932 in Nice, France) was a French and Polish silent movie and theater actor.

== Life and career ==
Bolesław Kamil Pluciński was born in Lublin, Poland (then part of the Russian Empire), on 17 July 1854. His father, Apolinary Pluciński, was one of the organizers of the January Uprising in Lublin in January 1863. His involvement led the family to move to Paris, where Apolinary was hired as a professor at a Polish school. His son, Bolesław, was educated in two languages and two cultures. He began his acting lessons very early and was trained by actors from La comedie Française. During his career in Paris he appeared in many notable productions at the Théâtre de l'Odéon, Théâtre des Batignolles, Fantasies-Parisienne Theatre, as well as at theatres in Reims, Brussels, Nice.

Pluciński adopted the professional name Armand Dutertre and appeared in thirty-five silent films. Among his numerous roles, his favourite was that of the priest in Le Roman d'un Mousse (1914). It was one of Léonce Perret's movies with whom Dutertre made thirteen films. The most successful film in his career was The Garden of Allah (1927) directed by Rex Ingram, one of the most important movie director of this epoch. The film was shot on location in Cairo and Nice and had international success with very good reviews.

After many great performances and because of his talent, he was nominated as a director in the Theater in Cairo. The repertoire composed by Dutertre was only including the most valuable texts. He was also a director of Theatre in Brussels. In Nice, he worked for fifteen years as a professor as well as teaching acting at the Villa Thiole - the oldest fine arts school in the city.

For most of his life, Pluciński was connected with the Association of Polish Students at the Polish School in Paris. He was invited to speak at many Polish cultural events. He was always satisfied to participate; he was born in a patriotic family and he always maintained his Polish identity.

Pluciński was married twice and had two children. Both children died before him. His first wife, Marie Plucińska (née Brzezicka) was a Polish pianist. Afterward, he married a factory worker from Saint-Quentin named Marie-Jeanne, who cared from him until his death. Despite his impressive career, Pluciński spent the last of his years in poverty and suffering from kidney disease. Before his death, he was motivated to perform some poetry recitals in the United States of America. On 31 May 1932, aged 78, Pluciński died after an episode of uremia while in hospital. He was interred at the Cimetière du Grand Jas in Cannes on 2 June 1932 in a white marble tomb next to his mother and his first wife.

== Selected filmography ==
- Mathias Sandorf (1921)
- The Orchid Dancer (1928)

== Sources ==
- Lublin-Paris-Lublin 700 ans d'itinéraires croisés d'artistes et d'intellectuels polonais et français. Échanges et dialogues entre deux villes au coeur de l'Europe -Éditions de L'Université Catholique de Lublin Jean Paul II
- http://www.wydawnictwokul.lublin.pl/sklep/product_info.php?products_id=3598
- http://paris-lublin700ans.eu/conference/23-mars/boleslaw-kamil-plucinski-armand-dutertre-1854-lublin-1932-nice-comedien-de-lodeon/#infos-pratiques
