= The Orchid Dancer =

1928 film

- German poster
- Directed by: Léonce Perret
- Written by: Jean-Joseph Renaud (novel)
- Starring: Louise Lagrange; Ricardo Cortez; Xenia Desni
- Cinematography: Léonce-Henri Burel; René Colas; Jacques Montéran
- Production company: Franco Films
- Distributed by: Franco Films
- Release date: April 29, 1928
- Running time: 60 minutes
- Country: France
- Languages: Silent; French intertitles

The Orchid Dancer (French: La danseuse Orchidée) is a 1928 French silent drama film directed by Léonce Perret and starring Louise Lagrange, Ricardo Cortez and Xenia Desni. It was shot at the Victorine Studios in Nice. The film's art direction was by Jacques-Laurent Atthalin and Henri Ménessier

== Synopsis ==
Luicha returns briefly to her home town in the Basque Country to visit her mother. She says she works as a teacher in Paris. One of the young men falls in love with her and asks her to marry him. She is attracted to him, but says she can't marry him and hastily returns to the French capital. He follows her there and discovers she is famous in Paris as an exotic dancer known as "The Orchid Dancer".

== Cast ==
- Louise Lagrange as Luicha Irrigoyen, la danseuse Orchidée
- Ricardo Cortez as Yoanes Etchegarry dit Jean Barliave
- Xenia Desni as Marise Laborde
- Danièle Parola as Miss Flute
- Marthe Lepers as Kattalin
- Gaston Jacquet as Buguelle
- Henri Richard as Martineau
- Sig Arno as Paulo
- Henriette Clairval-Terof as Madeleine
- Thérèse de Zunin as La baronne d'Ange
- Gerald Fielding as Doulaze
- Ernest Chambery as Le baron d'Ange
- Armand Dutertre as Le régisseur
- Madame Stavelly as Madame Deraing
- Damorès as Le professeur
- Henri Mène as Ignacio
- M. Violette as L'aide
- Julio de Romero as Horowitz
- Flore Deschamps as La secrétaire
- Marcya Capri
- Yvette Dubost
- Nilda Duclos
- Denise Lorys
- Gil Roland

== Bibliography ==
- Rège, Philippe. Encyclopedia of French Film Directors, Volume 1. Scarecrow Press, 2009.
