= Broken Fetters =

1916 film directed by Rex Ingram

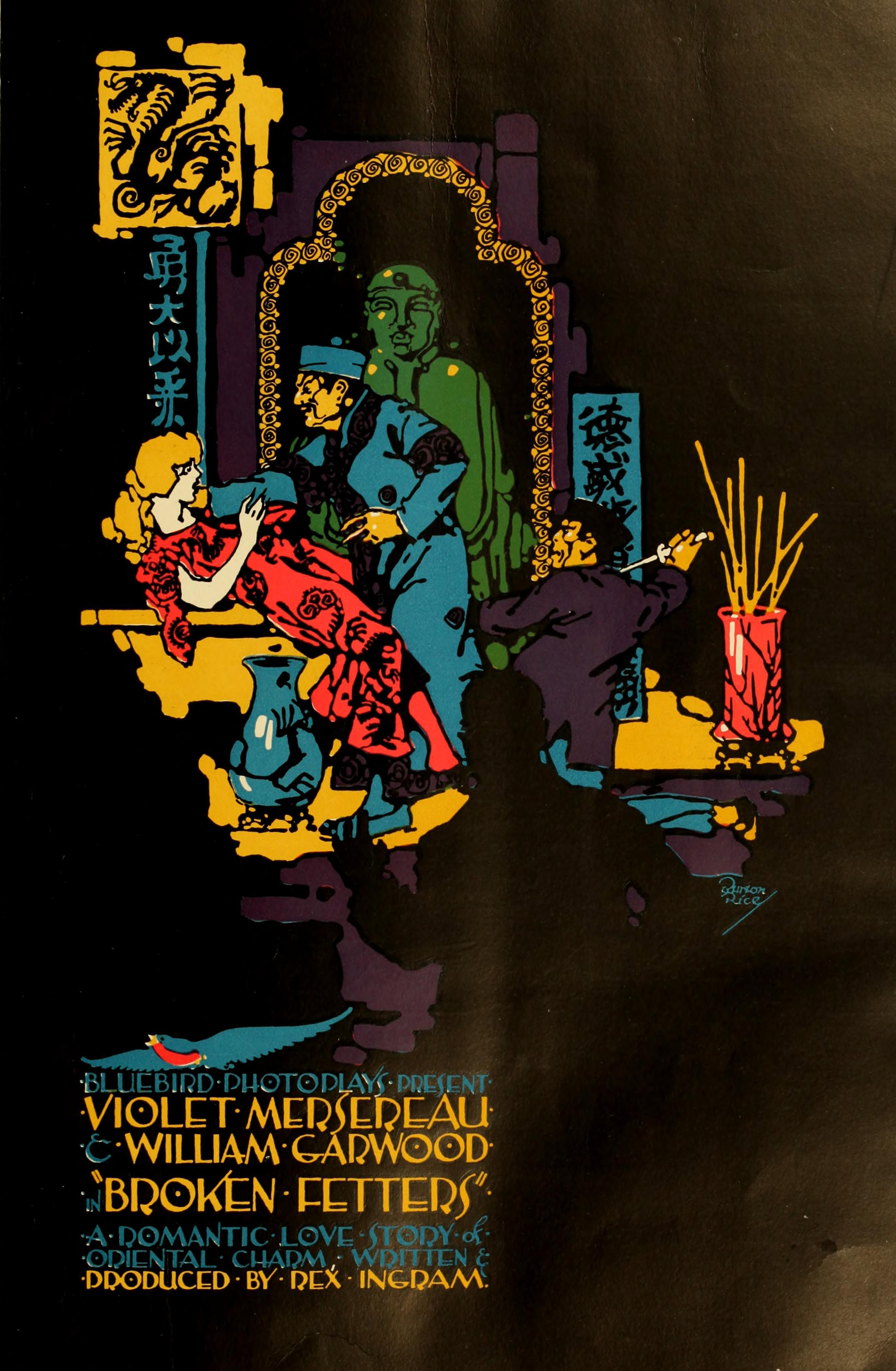
- Directed by: Rex Ingram
- Written by: Rex Ingram
- Starring: Kittens Reichert; Violet Mersereau; Charles Francis; Earl Simmons
- Cinematography: Stanley Sinclair
- Production company: Bluebird Photoplays
- Distributed by: Bluebird Photoplays
- Release date: July 3, 1916
- Running time: 5 reels (approximately 50 minutes)
- Country: United States
- Languages: Silent film English intertitles

Broken Fetters is a 1916 American silent drama film written and directed by Rex Ingram. Violet Mersereau played the lead role. The film was shot in Fort Lee, New Jersey where Universal Studios and other early film studios in America's first motion picture industry were based at the beginning of the 20th century.

== Production ==
Broken Fetters was produced by Bluebird Photoplays, one of the three brands of motion pictures then being released by Universal Film Manufacturing Company.

== Cast ==
- Kittens Reichert as Mignon, as a child
- Violet Mersereau as Mignon, grown up
- Charles Francis as Kong Hee
- Earl Simmons as Bruce King
- Frank Smith as Foo Shai
- William Dyer as The Captain
- Paul Panzer as Carleton Demarest
- Isabel Patterson as Mrs. Demarest
- William Garwood as Lawrence Demarest
- Paddy Sullivan as Mike
- Guy Morville as The Detective
- Charles Fang as Chang
