= Henri Ménessier =

- Born: 1 October 1882; France
- Died: 1948 (aged 65–66); France
- Occupations: Art director, artist
- Years active: 1905–1949 (film)

Henri Ménessier (1 October 1882 – 1948) was a French artist and art director.

== Selected filmography ==
- The Virtuous Model (1919)
- The Orchid Dancer (1928)
- The Pure Truth (1931)
- Monsieur Albert (1932)
- Number 33 (1933)
- Fedora (1934)
- The Lady of the Camellias (1934)
- Dora Nelson (1935)
- Dédé (1935)
- The Pont-Biquet Family (1935)
- Lucrezia Borgia (1935)
- The Assault (1936)
- You Can't Fool Antoinette (1936)
- Gargousse (1938)
- Night in December (1940)
- My Last Mistress (1943)

== Bibliography ==
- Michael L. Stephens. Art Directors in Cinema: A Worldwide Biographical Dictionary. McFarland, 1998.
