= Alice Terry =

American actress (1899–1987)

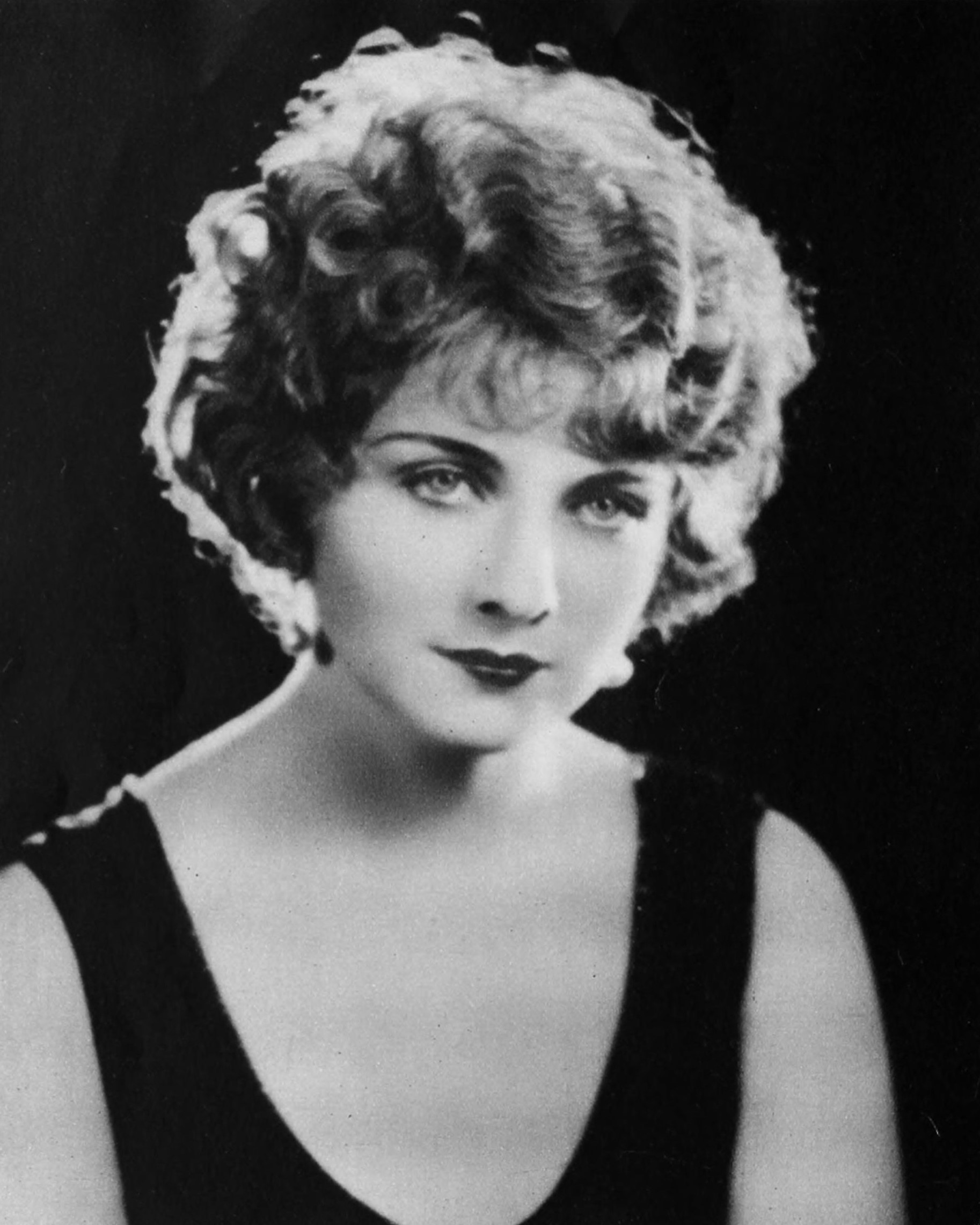
- Stars of the Photoplay, 1924
- Born: Alice Frances Taaffe; July 24, 1899; Vincennes, Indiana, U.S.
- Died: December 22, 1987 (aged 88); Burbank, California, U.S.
- Occupation: Actress
- Years active: 1916–1933
- Spouse: Rex Ingram (m. 1921; died 1950)

Alice Frances Taaffe (July 24, 1899 – December 22, 1987), known professionally as Alice Terry, was an American film actress and director. She began her career during the silent film era, appearing in thirty-nine films between 1916 and 1933. While Terry's trademark look was her blonde hair, she was actually a brunette, and put on her first blonde wig in Hearts Are Trumps (1920) to look different from Francelia Billington, the other actress in the film. Terry played several different characters in the 1916 anti-war film Civilization, co-directed by Thomas H. Ince and Reginald Barker. Alice wore the blonde wig again in her most acclaimed role as "Marguerite" in the film The Four Horsemen of the Apocalypse (1921), and kept the wig for any future roles. In 1925 her husband Rex Ingram co-directed Ben-Hur, filming parts of it in Italy. The two decided to move to the French Riviera, where they set up a small studio in Nice and made several films on location in North Africa, Spain, and Italy for MGM and others. In 1933, Terry made her last film appearance in Baroud, which she also co-directed with her husband.

== Early years ==
Terry was born Alice Frances Taaffe in Vincennes, Indiana, on July 24, 1899. In the early 1910s she and her family moved to southern California.

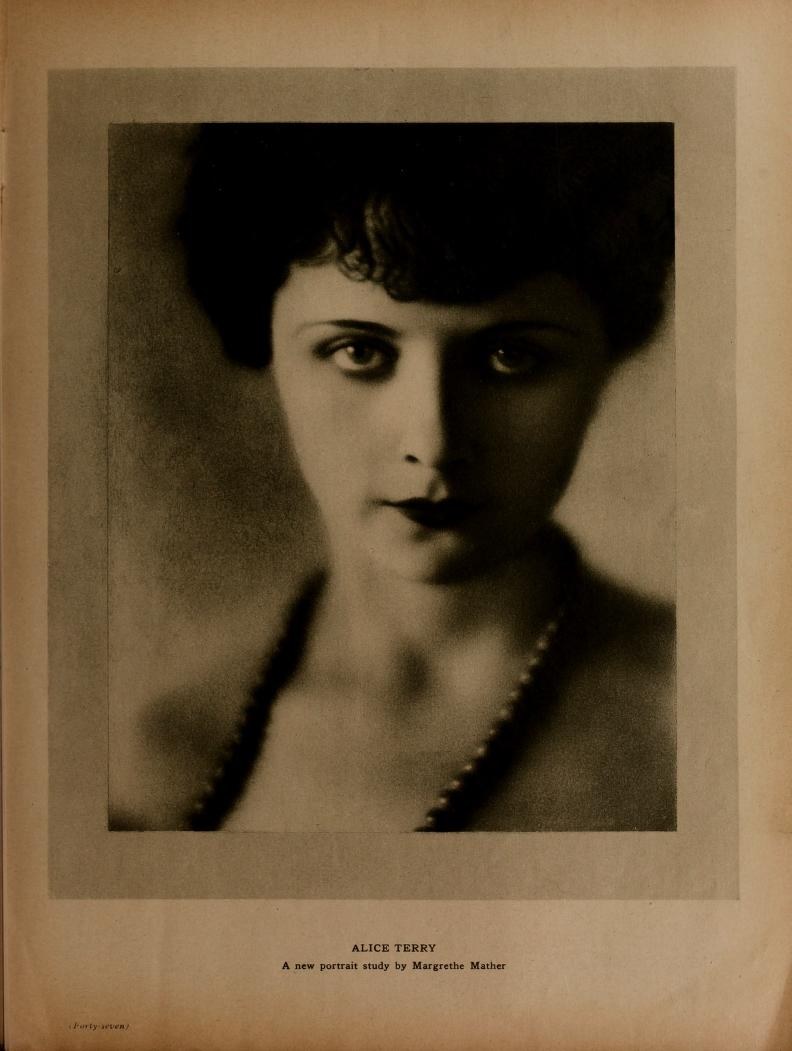
Margrethe Mather, Alice Terry, December 1922, in Motion Picture Classic, vol. 10, no. 4

== Career ==
Terry made her film debut in 1916 in Not My Sister, opposite Bessie Barriscale and William Desmond.

Terry started in films as an extra during her mid-teens, working at Thomas Ince Studio. She worked for Triangle Film Corporation from 1916 to 1919. She worked as an extra to help her family financially. She turned down being a full time actress and was interested in steady work to help support her family. For two years she worked in cutting rooms at Famous-Players-Lasky; she had also worked in a department store.

Despite her rising success, Terry felt restricted by the demands of Hollywood; her weight, hair color, acting, and dancing were all scrutinized, she was required to learn French (despite the films being silent), and her name was changed, all in service of making her a star.

Terry was married to Rex Ingram, a prominent director who directed most of the films that she played in. She gained recognition for her performances in The Four Horsemen of the Apocalypse and The Prisoner of Zenda. Terry was recognized for her beauty and screen presence, and often played lead roles.

Ingram altered her appearance, encouraging her to wear blonde wigs, get dental work, and lose weight. Ingram also hired male stars who outshone her, such as in The Conquering Power (1921) and The Prisoner of Zenda. One fan magazine writer described Terry as "pliant clay," easily manipulated on screen.

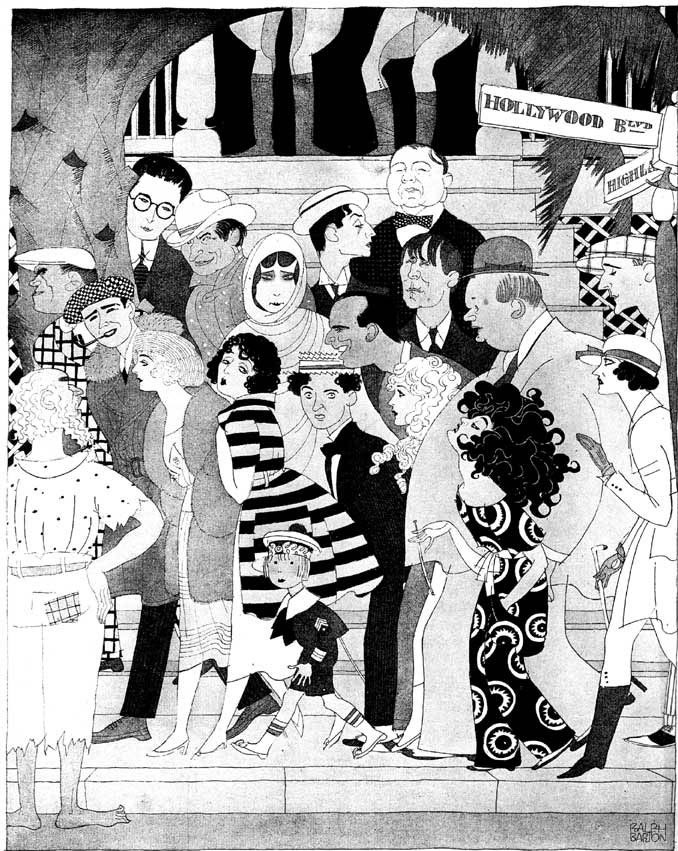
This 1922 Vanity Fair caricature by Ralph Barton shows the famous people who, he imagined, left work each day in Hollywood; use cursor to identify individual figures.

In 1924 and 1925 their marriage was in jeopardy, and Terry worked with other directors. Her success during this period, particularly in Any Woman and Sackcloth and Scarlet, proved that she was a legitimate star away from her husband. With their relationship mended, Terry acted in six more pictures after 1925, five of which were directed by her husband, but she also took on additional responsibilities behind the scenes.

Terry's early work in the cutting room at Famous-Players-Lasky had prepared her for increased technical work. Ingram often became too moody to work while directing movies, so Terry would take over for him. She was a competent film editor and learned how to direct from a master. Terry was the co-director on Baroud, Ingram's last film and only talkie; Terry directed every scene that Ingram acted in.

== Personal life ==
On November 5, 1921, Terry married Ingram during production of The Prisoner of Zenda, which he directed and in which she appeared as Princess Flavia. They sneaked away over one weekend, were married in Pasadena, and returned to work promptly the following Monday.

Early in their marriage, Terry had wanted to retire from acting, with Zenda as her last picture, and return to private life; however, she felt overwhelmed by managing the household alone, and at her husband's encouraging, returned to the screen.

In 1923 Terry and Ingram decided to move to the French Riviera. They formed a small studio in Nice and made several films on location in North Africa, Spain, and Italy for MGM and others.

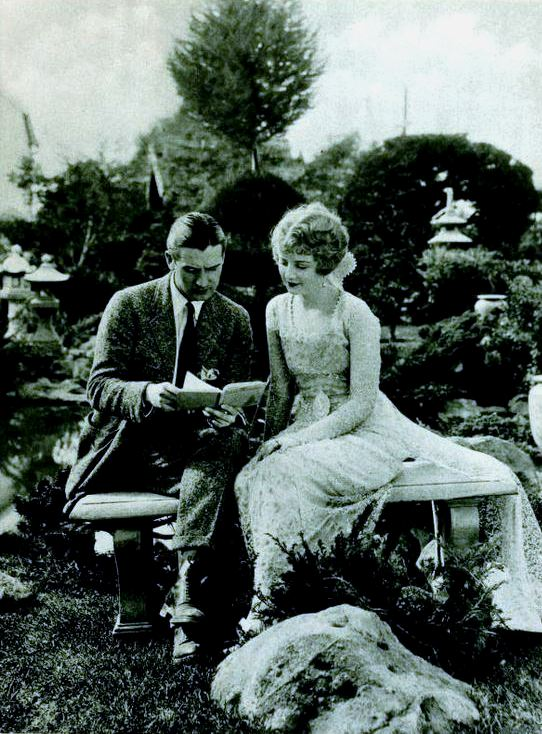
Terry with her husband, Rex Ingram. Photoplay, March 1922.

During the making of The Arab in Tunisia, they met a street child named Kada-Abd-el-Kader, whom they adopted upon learning that he was an orphan. Allegedly, he misrepresented his age to make himself seem younger to his adoptive parents.

Terry was close with her frequent co-star Ramón Novarro. In the 1930s she went with Novarro, Barry Norton, and other queer actors to Hollywood nightspots in order to act as a cover, and received backlash for this in The Hollywood Reporter.

When Ingram decided to return to Los Angeles he asked Terry to find a home by a river. One night when Terry was drinking with friends she instructed the cab to pull over so she could throw up. When Terry was done, she looked up and saw a property in Studio City on the Los Angeles River and decided that this was the place where her new home with Rex would be.

Once Terry and Ingram moved back to the United States they started having problems with their adopted son, Kada-Abd-el-Kader. He "began associating with fast women and fast cars throughout the San Fernando Valley." Terry and Ingram sent him back to Morocco "to finish school." Kada-Abd-el-Kader never went back to school, but he later became a tourist guide in Morocco and Algiers. El-Kader would always tell tourists that he was the adopted son of Ingram and Terry.

Terry and Ingram retired in the 1930s and took up painting. She began to move away from acting as the era of talkies dawned, focusing on her family. When Ingram died in 1950, Terry invited four of his mistresses to his funeral. When she was asked how she could invite four of his mistresses to the post-funeral party, she quipped, "Who cares, I'm the only one that can call herself Mrs. Rex Ingram."

After Ingram's death, Terry's sister Edna moved into the property on Kelsey Street and. Edna was controlling, forbidding Alice's lover Gerald Fielding from moving in with her. Edna may have been motivated by jealousy, as she had started out as an extra as movies just like her sister, but had stopped acting after her marriage to a financial advisor.

Terry was still active in the 1970s. She focused on her interest and personal life, mainly living in privacy maintaining a low profile. She loved hosting Sunday afternoon parties and going out to dinner in extravagant, floor length mink coats.

== Death ==
On December 22, 1987, Terry died from Alzheimer's in a Burbank, California, hospital. Her grave is located in the Valhalla Memorial Park Cemetery in North Hollywood, Los Angeles, California. For her contribution to the motion picture industry, Alice Terry has a star on the Hollywood Walk of Fame at 6626 Hollywood Boulevard.

== Filmography ==
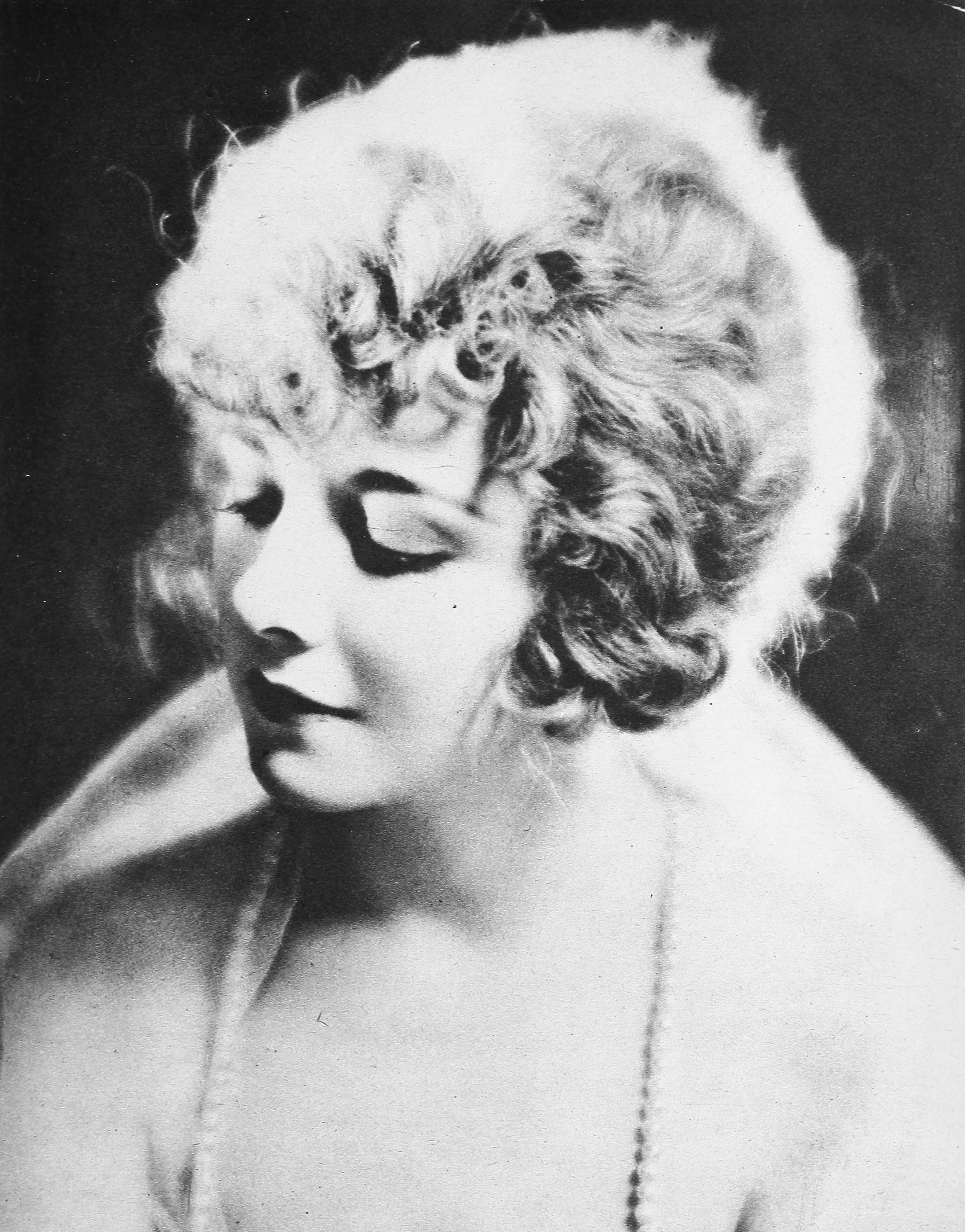
Terry in Picture-Play, May 1921

Year	Title	Role	Notes
1916	Not My Sister	Ruth Tyler	Credited as Alice Taafe; Lost film
1916	Civilization	Extra (Various, from a peasant to a German Soldier)	Uncredited
1916	A Corner in Colleens	Daisy	Credited as Alice Taafe; Lost film
1917	Wild Winship's Widow	Marjory Howe	Credited as Alice Taafe; Lost film
1917	Strictly Business		Lost film
1917	The Bottom of the Well	Anita Thomas	
1917	Alimony	Extra	Uncredited; Lost film
1918	The Clarion Call		Lost film
1918	A Bachelor's Children	Penelope Winthrop	Lost film
1918	Old Wives for New	Saleslady	Credited as Alice Taafe
1918	The Song and the Sergeant		Lost film
1918	Sisters of the Golden Circle	Mrs. Pinkey McGuire	Lost film
1918	The Brief Debut of Tildy	Tildy	Lost film
1918	Love Watches	Charlotte Bernier	Lost film
1918	The Trimmed Lamp		Lost film
1919	Thin Ice	Jocelyn Miller	
1919	The Love Burglar	Elsie Strong	Credited as Alice Taafe; Lost film
1919	The Valley of the Giants	Mrs. Cardigan	Credited as Alice Taafe; Alternative title: In the Valley of the Giants
1919	The Day She Paid		Credited as Alice Taafe; Alternative title: Oats and the Woman; Lost film
1920	Shore Acres	Extra	Uncredited; Lost film
1920	The Devil's Pass Key	Extra	Uncredited; Lost film
1920	Hearts Are Trumps	Dora Woodberry	Lost film
1921	The Four Horsemen of the Apocalypse	Marguerite Laurier	
1921	The Conquering Power	Eugenie Grandet	Alternative title: Eugenie Grandet
1922	Turn To The Right	Elsie Tillinger	
1922	The Prisoner of Zenda	Princess Flavia	
1923	Where the Pavement Ends	Matilda Spener	Lost film
1923	Scaramouche	Aline de Kercadiou, Quintin's Niece	
1924	The Arab	Mary Hilbert	
1925	The Great Divide	Ruth Jordan	
1925	Sackcloth and Scarlet	Joan Freeman	Lost film
1925	Confessions of a Queen	Frederika/The Queen	Incomplete film
1925	Any Woman	Ellen Linden	Lost film
1926	Mare Nostrum	Freya Talberg	Alternative title: Our Sea
1926	The Magician	Margaret Dauncey	
1927	Lovers	Felicia	Lost film
1927	The Garden of Allah	Domini Enfilden	Incomplete film
1928	The Three Passions	Lady Victoria Burlington	
1932	Baroud		Co-director; Alternative title: Love in Morocco
