= Hubert Julian "Jay" Stowitts =

American painter

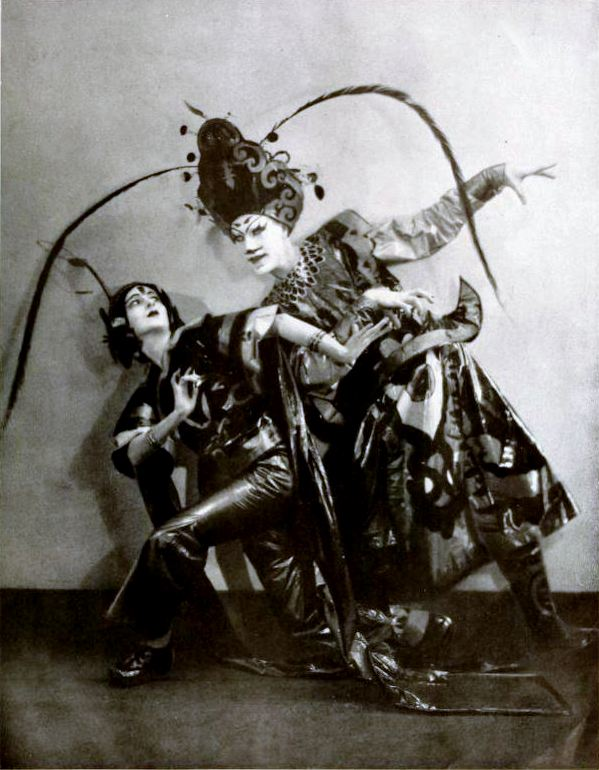
Dancers Ruth Page and Hubert Stowitts, from a 1923 magazine

Hubert Julian "Jay" Stowitts was an openly gay American ballet dancer and painter.

== Early life ==
Jay Stowitts was born on June 26, 1892, in Rushville, Nebraska. He spent his most formative years in Lead, South Dakota where his father worked in the offices of the Homestake gold mine. After graduating with top honors from high school in 1910, Stowitts and his family moved to Southern California to seek a warmer and healthier climate for his father, who suffered from respiratory troubles. The next year, Stowitts was accepted at the University of California, Berkeley, where he studied business and economics. During that time Stowitts took up athletics, eventually becoming captain of the track team. He also became interested in dance and appeared with great success in both private and public performances.

== A dancer and choreographer ==
Stowitts was discovered by the ballerina Anna Pavlova in 1915 and he joined her troupe: he toured all over Europe and the Americas with the great dancer. Although not trained as a classical dancer, Stowitts gained fame as a 'character dancer,' a specialist in national or folk styles of movement. He also introduced elements of modern dance to the traditional ballet repertoire. In 1921 he left Pavlova's company and struck out on his own. In addition to dancing, Stowitts also had a growing reputation as a talented painter and theatrical designer. Beginning in 1924 he collaborated with wealthy collector and writer Templeton Crocker on a Chinese opera, Fay Yen Fah, for which Stowitts devised the fanciful costumes and scenery.

== Ethnographic artist and film career ==
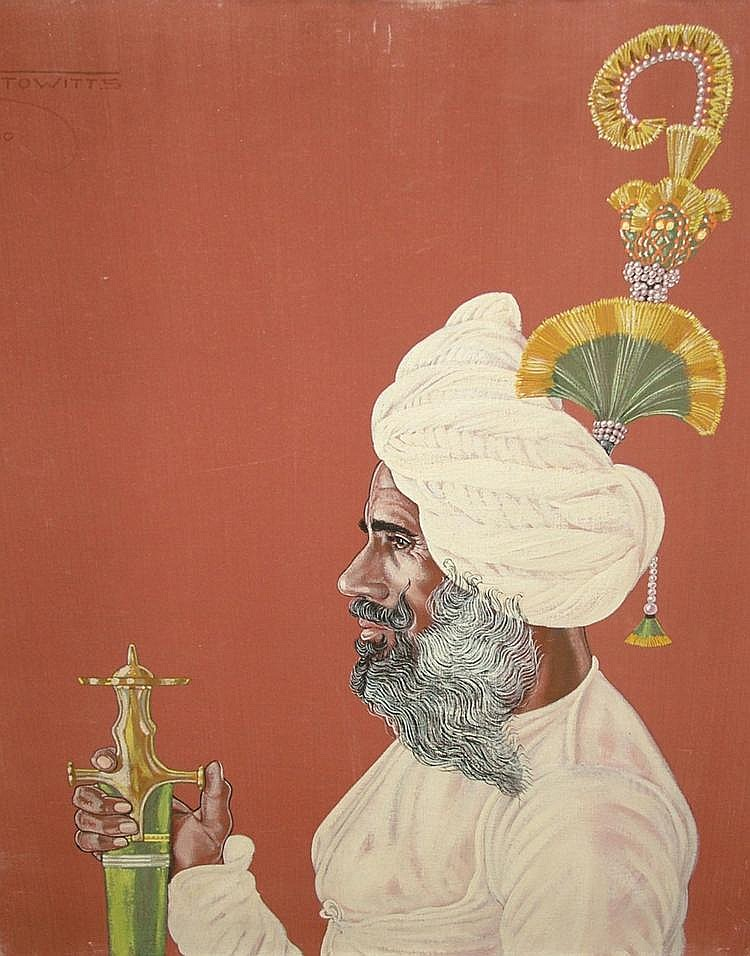
A portrait from the Vanishing India series

In 1925 Stowitts was hired to choreograph and perform in the film The Magician. This was his first film commission. In 1927 Stowitts went to Italy where he painted portraits of such personalities as Ezra Pound and Benito Mussolini. After this he sailed to Java where he painted a series of portraits of dancers and court performers. Next, he went to Calcutta, India where he began his most ambitious series, "Vanishing India," featuring 155 portraits of native Indians of all ranks, professions, and castes which he first exhibited in 1931. After returning home to Los Angeles, Stowitts began doing choreographic and design work for the motion pictures. His most remarkable piece was an exotic ballet sequence for the 1934 film The Painted Veil starring Greta Garbo. That same year he choreographed an elaborate scene for the film Dante's Inferno.

== American champions and after ==
The profits for film work enabled Stowitts to begin a new series of paintings in 1935 that would celebrate Olympic athletes. He called this group of paintings "American Champions:" it would eventually consist of fifty-five life-seized nude portraits of athletes, along with a number of smaller portraits. Many of the sportsmen whom he painted qualified for the U.S. team that went to the 1936 Summer Olympic Games in Berlin, Germany. When the paintings were rejected for inclusion among the American submissions to the Art Competitions at the games, Stowitts transported the massive paintings at his own expense to Berlin. They were displayed from September 5 to September 10, 1936 at a private gallery in Berlin. Nazi officials closed the exhibit early because it contained portraits of African-American and Jewish athletes, among them Woody Strode.

After having paid for shipping and for his fare to Berlin, Stowitts was left destitute in Germany. He was befriended by the film maker Leni Riefenstahl who was fascinated by the American Champions paintings. In 1936 Riefenstahl helped Stowitts obtain a job choreographing a spectacular Javanese dance sequence for the film Fanny Elssler. This job provided him with enough money to sail back home. Early in 1938 Riefenstahl contacted Stowitts for help in promoting an American showing of her film, Olympia. He did the best he could, but anti-German sentiment was on the rise in the wake of Nazi atrocities, and this made reception of the film and its director unfavorable.

During World War II Stowitts kept a low profile as he worked on his next series of paintings, "The Golden Age of the Ballets Russe," which grew to feature forty-two canvases depicting the great stars of the age of Pavlova, Nijinsky, and Diaghilev.

== Final years ==
The final years of Stowitts's life saw his increasing marginalization as he was plagued with public apathy and personal poverty, exacerbated by worsening physical and mental health. He turned inward and steeped himself in Eastern philosophy, esoteric beliefs, and hidden wisdom that he believed lay at the root of life's meaning. Stowitts became a virtual recluse, living in a small cottage in his sister's backyard. The last group of paintings he made at this time was the "Atomic" series of colorful paintings showing nude male forms overpainted with circles, lines, and geometric shapes, all indicating arcane significance. Hubert Stowitts died of heart and kidney failure in 1953 at a rest home in San Marino, California.

== Private life ==
Stowitts was a freethinker who lived life as an open but discreet homosexual, and the frequent presence of muscular male physiques in his art testifies to his taste in men. Although he had many sexual liaisons in his lifetime, he never had a long-time partner. Stowitts lived life on his own terms, and he refused to let society dictate his life or habits. He was a confirmed nudist, and would throw off his clothes whenever he felt the urge. Stowitts was adored by his family, and they did whatever they could to make his life more comfortable. Without their help, he would have had a much harder existence.

== Legacy ==
Stowitts always claimed that he was an ethnographer, not a fine artist, though clearly he was both. During his lifetime, Stowitts generally refused to sell any paintings, hoping that his collected works would be preserved together. After his death, his possessions passed to his sister, who struggled to find a buyer for them. A museum dedicated to Stowitts was opened in Pacific Grove, California in 1980. It displayed a number of his paintings in exhibitions before closing in 2008.

Most of the hundreds of paintings that Stowitts created have disappeared or been dispersed. Stowitts generally painted in egg tempera on prepared boards. Unfortunately, this is a fragile medium, and many works are believed to have deteriorated. Some of the Java and India paintings are known to be in private and/or public collections. The fate of the vast majority of Stowitts's work is currently unknown.
