= Any Woman =

1925 film

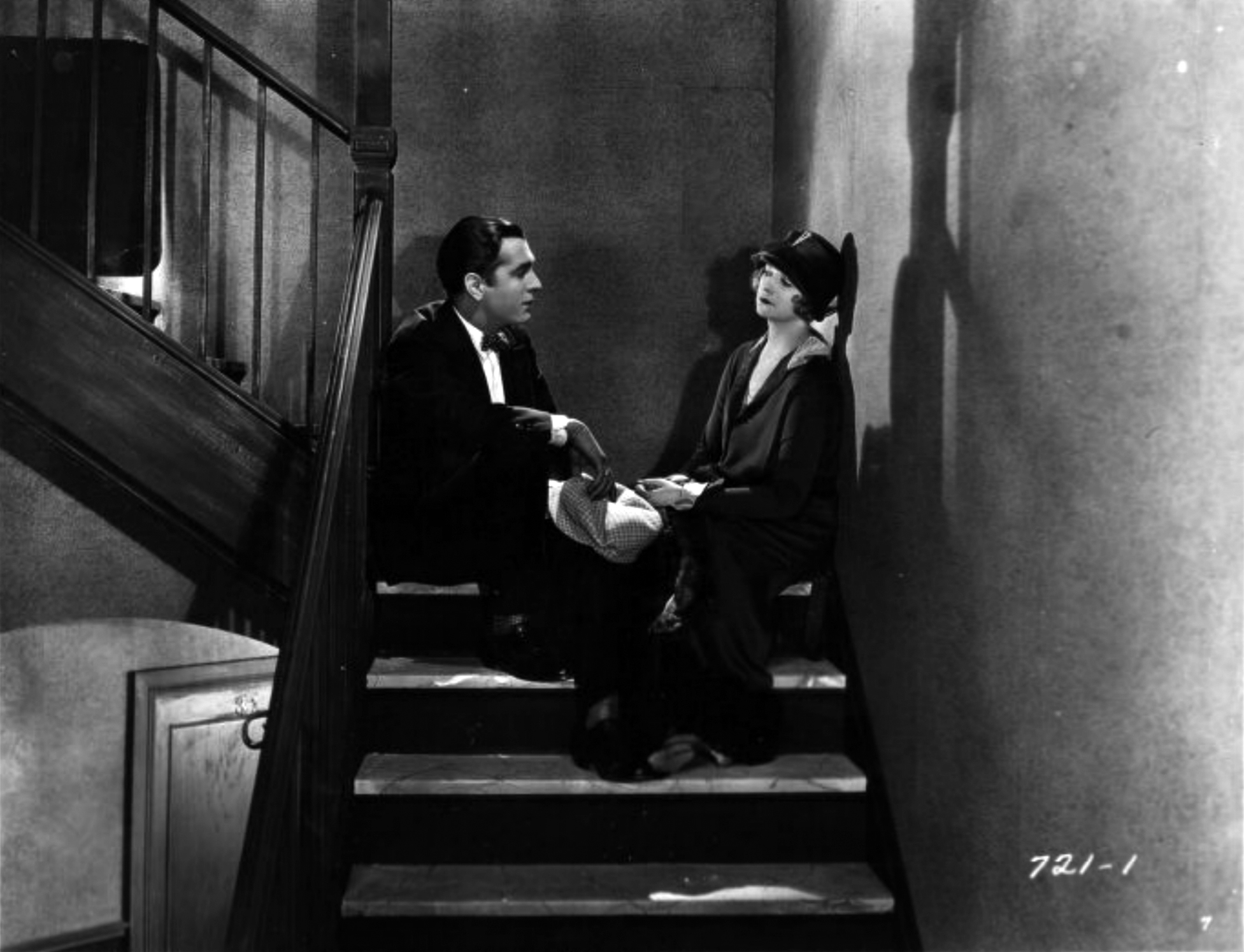
- Reed and Terry in a still from the film
- Directed by: Henry King
- Screenplay by: Randolph Bartlett; Jules Furthman; Arthur Somers Roche; Beatrice Van
- Produced by: Jesse L. Lasky; Adolph Zukor
- Starring: Alice Terry; Donald Reed; Margarita Fischer; Lawson Butt; Aggie Herring; James Neill; Henry Kolker
- Cinematography: Ernest Haller; William Schurr
- Production company: Famous Players–Lasky Corporation
- Distributed by: Paramount Pictures
- Release date: May 4, 1925
- Running time: 60 minutes
- Country: United States
- Language: Silent (English intertitles)

Any Woman is a 1925 American silent drama film directed by Henry King and written by Randolph Bartlett, Jules Furthman, Arthur Somers Roche and Beatrice Van. The film stars Alice Terry, Donald Reed, Margarita Fischer, Lawson Butt, Aggie Herring, James Neill, and Henry Kolker. The film was released on May 4, 1925, by Paramount Pictures.

== Plot ==
As described in a film magazine review, when Ellen Linden returns home, she finds her father ill and without funds. She immediately goes to work for James Rand and Egbert Phillips. She grows friendly with James, which makes Egbert jealous, although both are married men. Tom Galloway, a young friend of her father, loves her, but leaves for Europe. While he is there, she becomes innocently compromised with James, and his wife names her as a co-respondent in a suit for divorce. After the divorce, James proposes but Ellen turns him down. Tom returns, but writes to Ellen that he is sailing to Honolulu and wishes her happiness. She races for the ship and tells him that she is going with him on a honeymoon cruise.

== Cast ==
- Alice Terry as Ellen Linden
- Donald Reed as Tom Galloway
- Margarita Fischer as Mrs. Rand
- Lawson Butt as James Rand
- Aggie Herring as Mrs. Galloway
- James Neill as William Linden
- Henry Kolker as Egbert Phillips
- De Sacia Mooers as Mrs. Phillips
- George Periolat as Robert Cartwright
- Lucille Hutton as Agnes Young
- Arthur Hoyt as Jones
- Malcolm Denny as Lord Brackenridge
- Thelma Morgan as Alice Cartwright

== Preservation ==
With no prints of Any Woman located in any film archives, it is a lost film.
