= Goodbye Love (film) =

1933 film

- Charles Ruggles in Goodbye Love
- Directed by: H. Bruce Humberstone
- Written by: Hampton Del Ruth; George Rosener; John Howard Lawson
- Story by: Hampton Del Ruth
- Produced by: Joseph I. Schnitzer; Samuel Zierler
- Starring: Charles Ruggles; Verree Teasdale; Sidney Blackmer
- Cinematography: Charles Edgar Schoenbaum
- Edited by: Rose Loewinger
- Music by: Sam Wineland; Howard Jackson; Milan Roder; Oliver Wallace
- Distributed by: RKO Radio Pictures
- Release date: November 10, 1933
- Running time: 67 minutes
- Country: United States
- Language: English

Goodbye Love is a 1933 American pre-Code comedy film directed by H. Bruce Humberstone and starring Charles Ruggles.

== Plot ==
A wealthy financer, Chester Hamilton is sent to "alimony jail" for non-payment of alimony to Sandra. Hamilton's valet, Oswald Groggs, uses his boss’s reservations at an exclusive resort to go on vacation under the assumed identity of wealthy eccentric "Sir Oswald". Hamilton's fiancée Phyllis Van Kamp tries to marry "Sir Oswald" for his money. When Oswald seems to fall for her, the question is who will be left standing at the altar. Chester's trusted secretary, Dorothy Blaine, and a reporter, Brooks, witness all these shenanigans.

Brooks tells Hamilton that his fiancée is actually the infamous "gold digger" Fanny Malone, who is only out for his money. To break his engagement, Hamilton sleeps with Blaine, and is photographed by a private detective. Malone almost marries "Sir Oswald", but then discovers that the supposed British millionaire "big game hunter" in Africa who has allegedly shot hundreds of animals is actually the American valet Groggs, who is neither rich nor has he been to Africa. In the meantime, Hamilton marries Blaine, the woman who truly loves him.

== Cast ==
- Charles Ruggles as Oswald Groggs
- Verree Teasdale as Phyllis Van Kamp, aka Fanny Malone
- Sidney Blackmer as Chester Hamilton
- Phyllis Barry as Dorothy Blaine
- Ray Walker as Brooks
- Mayo Methot as Sandra Hamilton
- John Kelly as Sergeant Dugan, the jailer
- Grace Hayle as Lura "Ducky" Groggs
- Luis Alberni as Tony
- Richard Tucker as Eddie, Sandra Hamilton's lawyer
- Edward Van Sloan as Judge
- Gerald Fielding as Dunwoodie, Sandra's beau

== Soundtrack ==
- "Goodbye Love" (Written by Con Conrad, Archie Gottler and Sidney D. Mitchell)

== Significance ==
The American scholar Michael Slowik described Goodbye Love as one of the key films in its use of non-diegetic music (music heard by the audience, but not by the characters in the film). Most of the early talkies tended to feature diegetic music (music heard by both the audience and the characters). Slowik noted that in the early scenes in the Goodbye Love set in New York where both the main characters, Hamilton and Groggs, are sent to "alimony jail", the music is downbeat and sad. Later on, when Groggs affects an English accent and poses as the millionaire big game hunter "Sir Oswald" at the resort in Atlantic City and is surrounded by adoring young women, the music become light and bubbly. The type of music played in the background during the Atlantic City segment reflects that for the first time in his entire life Groggs had become a person of importance and has even become sexy and desirable. Likewise, when the gold digger Malone steals all of Grogg's money, the music again becomes sorrowful to reflect Groggs's miserable mood as he finds that she did not love him as she claimed and he is once again reduced back down to being a humble valet. In the scene where Hamilton is planning to be photographed having sex with someone who is not his fiancée to break his engagement, he is stunned to see the woman who has volunteered for this task is his secretary Dorthey Blaine who appears in her lingerie and declares her love for him; the music in this scene is lush and romantic as Blaine finally is able to express her feelings for Hamilton.

== Books ==
- Slowik, Michael (2014). After the Silents Hollywood Film Music in the Early Sound Era, 1926-1934. New York: Columbia University Press. ISBN 9780231535502.
