= The Three Passions =

1929 film by Rex Ingram

- Directed by: Rex Ingram
- Written by: Rex Ingram
- Based on: The Three Passions by Cosmo Hamilton
- Produced by: Rex Ingram
- Starring: Alice Terry; Iván Petrovich; Shayle Gardner; Clare Eames
- Cinematography: Léonce-Henri Burel
- Production company: St. George Productions
- Distributed by: Allied Artists
- Release date: December 1928
- Running time: 70 minutes
- Country: United Kingdom
- Languages: Sound (Synchronized) (English Intertitles)

The Three Passions is a 1928 British sound drama film directed by Rex Ingram and starring Alice Terry, Iván Petrovich and Shayle Gardner. While the film has no audible dialog, it was released with a synchronized musical score with sound effects using both the sound-on-disc and sound-on-film process. The film was made as a quota film for Allied Artists and was based on a novel by Cosmo Hamilton. It was filmed on the French Riviera.

== Cast ==
- Alice Terry as Lady Victoria Burlington
- Iván Petrovich as Philip Wrexham
- Shayle Gardner as John Wrexham (Lord Bellamont)
- Clare Eames as Lady Bellamont
- Leslie Faber as Father Aloysius
- Gerald Fielding as Bobbie
- Andrews Engelmann as Hairless Man
- Merle Oberon as Uncredited Extra

== See also ==
- List of early sound feature films (1926–1929)

== Bibliography ==
- Low, Rachael. The History of British Film, Volume 4 1918-1929. Routledge, 1997. ISBN 978-1-136-20634-4.
