= Francis Clere Hitchcock =

British army officer (1896-1962)

Francis Clere Hitchcock MC
- Born: March 15, 1896; Dublin, Ireland
- Died: 1963 (aged 66–67)
- Allegiance: United Kingdom
- Branch: British Army
- Rank: Colonel
- Service number: 11097
- Commands: Leinster Regiment
- Conflicts: First World War

Colonel Francis Clere Hitchcock MC (1896–1962) wrote Stand To—A Diary of the Trenches 1915–1918 about the activities of the second Leinster Regiment of the British Army in World War I.

== Biography ==
He was born in Dublin and spent most of his young life in Kinnitty, Birr, County Offaly where his father was the Church of Ireland parish rector. His brother was the Hollywood director Rex Ingram.

He enlisted as an officer in the Leinster Regiment in April 1916, after graduating from the Royal Military College, Sandhurst, and fought in France where he was awarded the Military Cross, the citation for which reads as follows:

For conspicuous gallantry in action. He led a successful raid against the enemy with great gallantry. After gaining touch with both flank parties, he reconnoitered the enemy's line, bombed several dugouts, shot a sentry and captured a prisoner.

He remained in the British Army until retirement with the rank of Colonel.

== Bibliography ==
- Stand to" : a diary of the Trenches 1915–18. London: Hurst & Blackett. 1937.
- To horse!. London: Hurst & Blackett. 1938.
