= The Magician (1926 film) =

1926 film by Rex Ingram

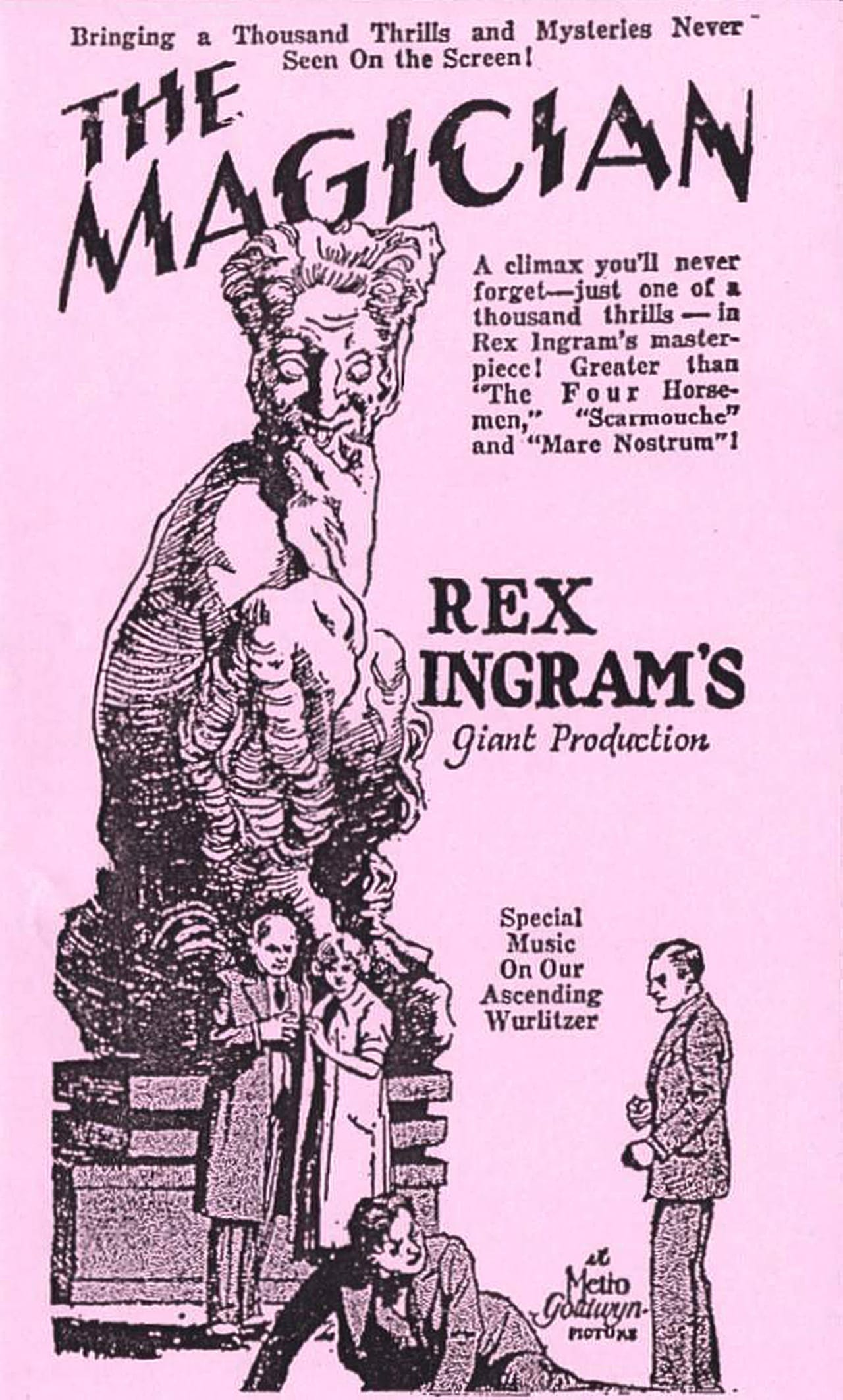
- Original movie poster
- Directed by: Rex Ingram
- Written by: Rex Ingram
- Based on: The Magician; 1908 novel by W. Somerset Maugham
- Produced by: Rex Ingram
- Starring: Alice Terry; Paul Wegener; Iván Petrovich
- Cinematography: John F. Seitz
- Edited by: Grant Whytock
- Distributed by: Metro-Goldwyn-Mayer
- Release date: October 24, 1926
- Running time: 88 minutes
- Country: United States
- Languages: Silent film English intertitles

The Magician is a 1926 American silent fantasy horror film directed by Rex Ingram about a magician's efforts to acquire the blood of a maiden for his experiments to create life. It was adapted by Ingram from the 1908 novel The Magician by W. Somerset Maugham. It stars Alice Terry (the director's wife), Paul Wegener and Iván Petrovich. Critic Carlos Clarens wrote that it was "perhaps the most elusive of lost films." However, since the time Clarens wrote this, various prints of the film have surfaced. Some have screened at independent movie festivals from 1993 onwards, and the film has also been shown on Turner Classic Movies. It remained commercially unavailable until being released on DVD in the Warner Brothers Archive Collection in 2011 (with a running time of 88 minutes).

== Plot ==
Full film

In the Latin Quarter of Paris, sculptor Margaret Dauncey is injured when the top of the huge statue of a faun she is working on breaks off and falls on her; her friend, painter Susie Boyd, gets help to lift the statue. After a successful surgery by Dr. Arthur Burdon saves Margaret from paralysis, she and Burdon fall in love.

The surgery is watched by various doctors and others including Oliver Haddo, a hypnotist, magician and student of medicine (a character in Maugham's original novel based on real-life occultist Aleister Crowley). Later, in the Library of the Arsenal, Haddo finds what he has been searching for - a magic formula for the creation of human life. One of the ingredients is the "heart blood of a Maiden". He rips out the page and presents the old book to Dr. Porhoët, Margaret's uncle and guardian, who has also been looking for it.

When Margaret, Burdon and Dr. Porhoët go to the Fair at Leon de Belfort, they encounter Haddo, whom Margaret dislikes immediately. When Dr. Porhoët claims that the snake charmers use harmless snakes, Haddo refutes him and demonstrates his powers by letting a deadly horned viper bite him. He then magically makes the wound disappear. Porhoët remains unconvinced until the discarded viper strikes a young woman performer. Burdon has to rush her to a hospital.

Later, Haddo visits Margaret uninvited. He hypnotizes her and tells her to concentrate on her statue. It seems to come to life to preside over a large orgy, including a pipe-playing faun and other fauns or satyrs, one of whom grabs at her before she wakes from the vision and finds Haddo leering at her.

Two days before her wedding to Burdon, Margaret receives a note from Haddo, asking her to see him the next morning. She tries to resist the summons, but fails. On the day of the wedding, Burdon learns that Margaret has married Haddo instead but Porhoët is convinced it was against his niece's will and Burdon tries to track them down.

Burdon eventually encounters the couple at a casino in Monte Carlo. He and Porhoët free Margaret while Haddo is away. Porhoët places her in a sanatorium to recover.

However, Haddo and his assistant, a little person, finds her and takes her to his hilltop laboratory in a tower. Just as Haddo is about to stab a bound Margaret, Burdon bursts in. After a violent struggle, Haddo falls into a huge fire and is killed. Margaret emerges from her trance and is reunited with her true love. Porhoët finds the page with the formula and burns it and sets the laboratory on fire, with the little person left hanging on a tree branch on the cliff.

== Cast ==
- Alice Terry as Margaret Dauncey
- Paul Wegener as Oliver Haddo
- Iván Petrovich as Dr. Arthur Burdon
- Firmin Gémier as Dr. Porhoët
- Gladys Hamer as Susie Boyd, Margaret's painter friend
- Henry Wilson as Haddo's Servant
- Hubert I. Stowitts as Dancing Faun (as Stowitts)

A young Michael Powell made a brief appearance in a comedic role and also acted as assistant director.

== Production ==
According to Carlos Clarens, "made for Metro in France, away from all interference, The Magician was saluted upon release by a barrage of negative criticism, mostly on grounds of tastelessness, that sealed the picture's doom. The still photographs, all that are available to the present day, show Ingram at the height of his pictorial talent."

Although the film is fundamentally a mad-scientist melodrama, it has been pointed out that "along with the Tod Browning-Lon Chaney collaborations, The Magician was one of the few serious American horror movies in a time of spoofs."

Paul Wegener's Magician co-workers found him difficult to work with. He had his own make-up artist "whom he screamed at on the slightest provocation.” Michael Powell was not impressed with Wegener's acting, saying his "one expression to indicate magical powers was to open his huge eyes even wider, until he looked about as frightened as a bullfrog."

Some film historians suspect Rex Ingram began losing interest in The Magician while filming the project and left sequences he did not find interesting to others to direct. This may account for why his credit on The Magician reads "Supervised by Rex Ingram." Henry Lachman claimed to have directed the Sabbat sequence and Powell supports this account in his memoirs. According to critic Carlos Clarens, the orgy scene recalls artistic depictions of the Greek god Pan, whom he listed as being portrayed by Stowitts, the American dancer at the Folies Bergere."

For theatre historians, The Magician provides a rare film record of the actor Firmin Gémier (1869-1933) in the supporting role of Dr. Porhoët. As a young man, Gémier had been a company member of two of the most important and influential avant-garde theatre companies in Paris in the 1880s and 1890s, working for André Antoine's Théâtre Libre and Aurélien Lugné-Poe's Théâtre de l'Œuvre. For the latter, he created the role of Père Ubu in the original production of Alfred Jarry's notorious Ubu roi (1896). When Antoine became artistic director of the national Théâtre de l'Odéon in 1906, he tapped Gémier to take over the artistic direction of his former operation, the Théâtre Antoine. Gémier appeared in only eight films, and his brief appearance in The Magician gives modern audiences a glimpse at what this prominent modernist theater star was like.

== Reception ==
Lawrence Reid of Motion Picture News praised the film as "weird, fantastic, adequately suspensive, and shivery . . . no matter how it is accepted (there isn't so much of the box-office ring about it, after all) no one is going to dismiss it as something that doesn't belong . . . The film is splendidly atmospheric, contains some unique settings and is very well acted by a cast of international flavor." Mordaunt Hall of The New York Times was impressed with the cast, writing that Alice Terry was "beautiful and phlegmatic," Ivan Petrovich "emphatically sympathetic and capable," and Paul Wegener "with good make-up" giving a "restrained performance."

Conversely, Variety's Fred was impressed with Wegener's performance yet more critical of the film, calling it "a very slow moving, draggy picture that has but a single thrill." Similarly, the Cleveland Plain Dealer described the film as "A wild, improbable tale, not without its suspense and interest," adding that "Ingram can never be stupid, but he is of late sometime careless."

== Soundtracks ==
Silent film composer Robert Israel created a score for the Turner Classic Movies reissue of the movie. The Ragged Ragtime Band created and performed a score for The Magician at the Brighton Fringe Festival in 2012. The Nenagh Silent Film Festival commissioned Eoin Mac Ionmhain to compose and premiere a live score for The Magician in 2013. In 2022 Redwood Creek Films released a 4K restoration of the movie with a new score by Laurent Pigeolet.
