= Emma Eames =

American actress (1865–1952)

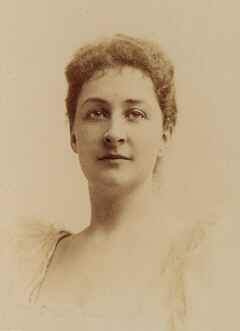
- Emma Eames, as photographed in 1892
- Born: August 13, 1865; Shanghai, China
- Died: June 13, 1952 (aged 86); New York City, US
- Occupations: Dramatic soprano; lyric soprano
- Spouses: Julian Russell Story (m. 1891; div. 1907) Emilio de Gogorza (m. 1911; div. 1936)
- Relatives: Clare Eames (niece)

Emma Eames (August 13, 1865 – June 13, 1952) was an American first lyric soprano, later dramatic soprano renowned for the beauty of her voice. She sang major lyric and lyric-dramatic roles in opera and had an important career in New York City, London and Paris during the last decade of the 19th century and the first decade of the 20th century.

== Early life ==
The daughter of an international lawyer, Eames was born in Shanghai, China, and raised in Portland and Bath in the American state of Maine. The promising quality of her voice was recognised early by her mother and she received singing lessons as a small girl. She attended school in Boston where she studied singing under Clara Munger, and later with Charles R. Adams.

Later she took voice lessons in Paris with the highly successful but autocratic teacher of bel canto sopranos, Mathilde Marchesi. It was noted in the press at the time of Marchesi's death in 1913 that Eames had praised the tuition she received from that teacher. Subsequently, however, she chose to downplay Marchesi's influence on her vocal technique.

== Singing career ==
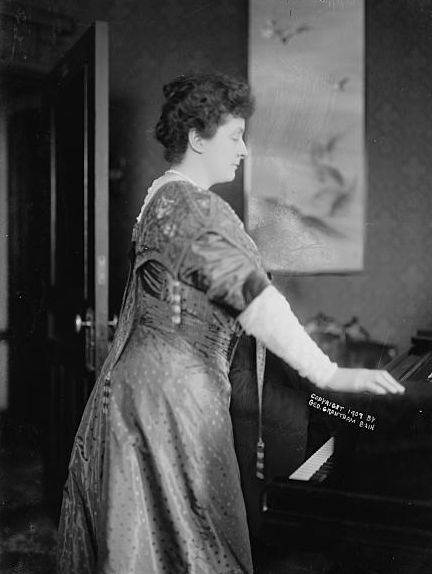
Emma Eames contemplates her piano

Eames made her professional operatic debut in Gounod's Roméo et Juliette at the Paris Opéra's headquarters, the Palais Garnier, in 1889. She would perform the role of Juliette many other times during the next two years, while adding other leading French-opera parts to her repertoire. As early as November 1889, The Times newspaper called her "the favourite cantatrice of the Opera". She left the company in 1891, however, for personal reasons. (She agreed to sing again in Paris in 1904, in a benefit performance of Puccini's Tosca, but this production was staged at La Salle Favart rather than the Palais Garnier.)

On November 9, 1891, Eames made her debut with the Metropolitan Opera on tour in Chicago (with the Chicago Symphony Orchestra at the Auditorium Theatre) as Elsa in Wagner's Lohengrin. She quickly became a favourite with Met audiences. She would perform regularly at the Met in a variety of operas until 1909, when a dispute with management precipitated her departure. Eames also made a number of successful appearances at London's Royal Opera House, Covent Garden. She sang there intermittently from 1891 to 1901 and established herself as a genuine rival to Covent Garden's reigning diva, Nellie Melba, whom she heartily disliked. Eames also sang in Madrid and fulfilled lucrative singing engagements at Monaco's chic Monte Carlo Opera during the 1890s.

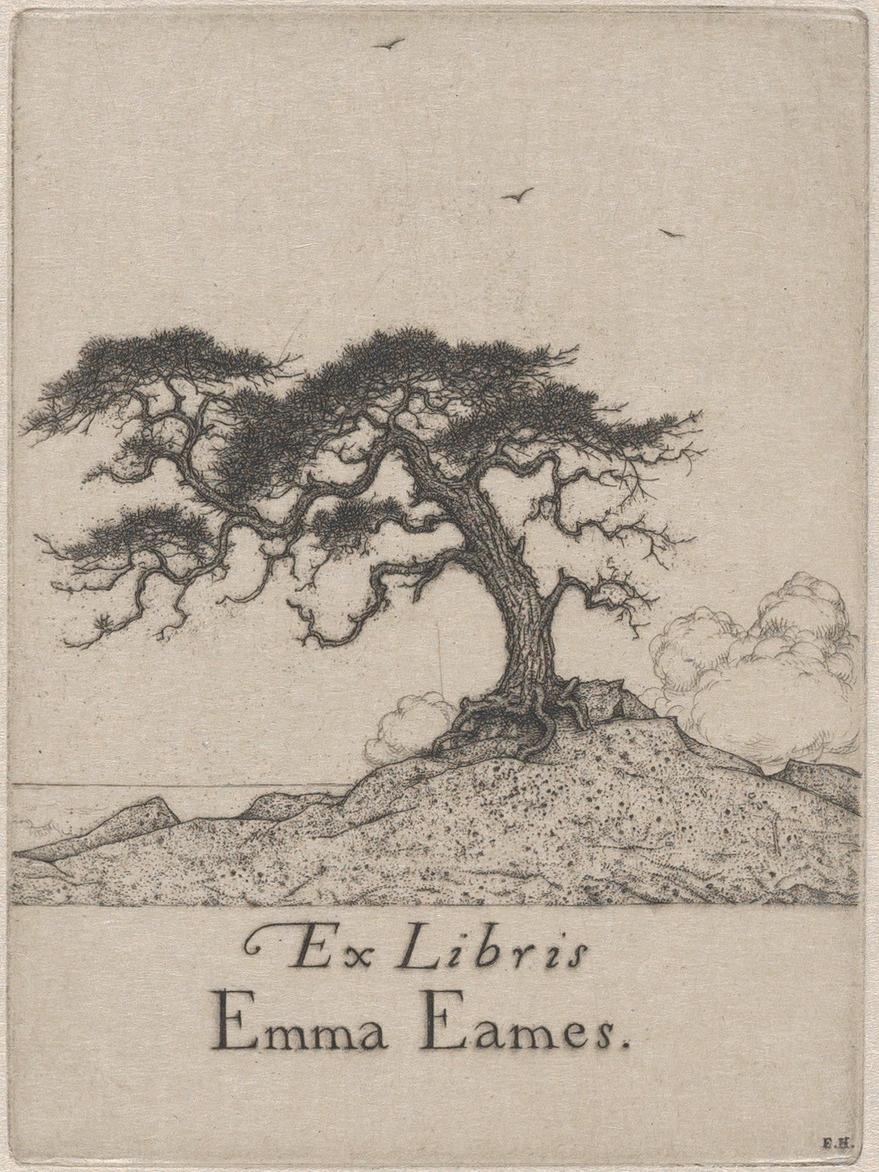
Ex Libris Emma Eames, bookplate by Ernest Haskell

In 1906, Eames visited San Francisco with a touring troupe of leading Met singers. She was fortunate to survive unscathed when a devastating earthquake and fire struck the city, damaging her hotel. Eames gave her farewell operatic performances during the 1911–12 seasons with the Boston opera company. She then undertook a series of concert tours of the United States, appearing on the recital platform for the last time in 1916, by which time her voice was showing signs of deterioration. Her autobiography, Some Memories and Reflections, was published in 1929.

Eames' press notices included the following random examples from the beginning of her career:

Paris Opera House:

Saint-Saëns' Ascanio, 1890: ""Mon coeur est sous la pierre", of Colombe... sung with exquisite taste and without accompaniment... a delightful Colombe... consummate art... evoking unanimous plaudits".

Covent Garden:

Gounod's Faust, April 7, 1891: "debut... immediate and very great success... middle notes of the voice, which have a peculiarly beautiful quality... approaching the timbre of the mezzo-soprano... the organ as a whole, though exceedingly sweet, is not very powerful, but the singer's method leaves nothing to desire, and her execution of brilliant passages is neat and accurate... [and although] no very striking amount of tragic power... charming and sincerely artistic".

Wagner's Lohengrin, April 11, 1891: "[as Elsa] a good deal of success... very great charm of her voice". Indeed, Hatton was to claim in 1931 that "The supreme personality is the one who can monopolise a part without any change ever being called for or desired -- such as ... Emma Eames as Elsa".

Massenet's Werther, 1894: "Mme. Emma Eames sings and acts most charmingly as Charlotte ... the beautiful quality of the singer's lower notes.. her performance was entirely successful".

== Her voice and recordings ==
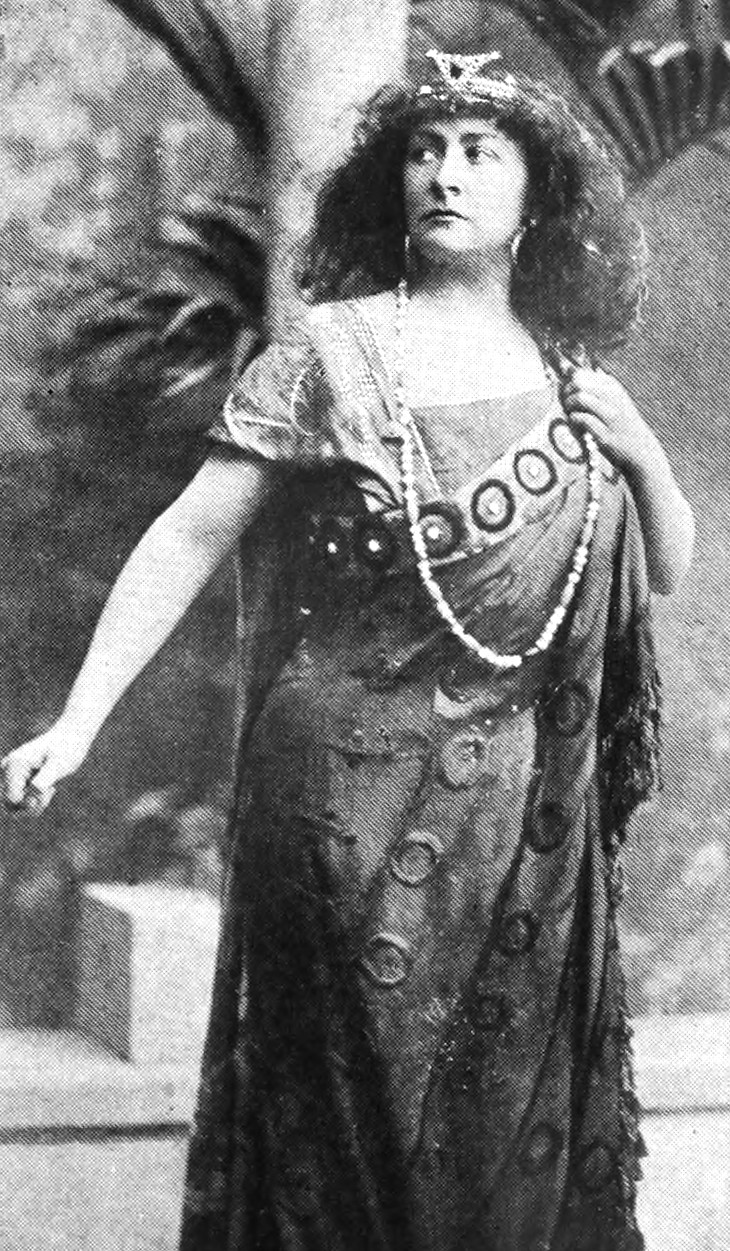
Emma Eames as Aida

During her prime, Eames possessed an opulently beautiful, aristocratic and expertly trained soprano voice. It began as a purely lyric instrument but increased in size over time, enabling her to sing parts as heavy as Aida, Sieglinde, Santuzza and Tosca in large auditoriums. Music critics occasionally took her to task, however, for the coldness of her interpretations and aloof stage manner.

Eames was reportedly unhappy with the way that she sounded on the series of commercial 78-rpm recordings she made in 1905-1911 for the Victor Talking Machine Company, and Victor technicians were equally unhappy with her imperious attitude in the studio. Victor engineer Harry O. Sooy acidly remarked in his memoirs "Mme. Eames last recording date was April 14, 1911, and the recording staff has not had one minute’s unrest because she does not make any more records for the V. T. M. Co." In 1939, however, she appeared on an American radio broadcast and selected some of her better recordings to play to listeners, speaking with little modesty about their merits. Eames' voice was also captured 'live' during an actual performance at the Met in 1903, on some primitive recordings which have become known as the Mapleson Cylinders. She sings (impressively) fragments of Tosca on these cylinders. They can be heard in the form of re-engineered digital transfers, together with all of her Victor recordings, on a Romophone CD release (catalogue number 81001-2).

In addition to Tosca and Romeo et Juliette, Eames' repertoire featured a comparatively small but stylistically diverse group of operas, ranging from works composed by Mozart, through Verdi and Wagner, to Mascagni. They included, among others, Aida, Otello, Il trovatore, Un ballo in maschera, Lohengrin, Die Meistersinger, Die Walküre, Faust, Werther, Cavalleria rusticana, The Magic Flute, Le nozze di Figaro and Don Giovanni.

== Personal life ==
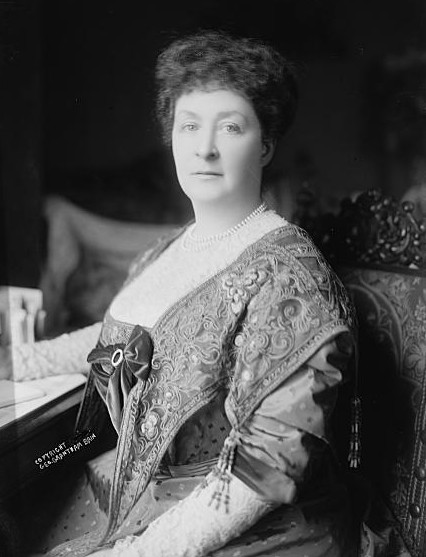
Emma Eames, 1909

Eames married twice, firstly to a society painter named Julian Russell Story, and then to the famous concert baritone Emilio de Gogorza, with whom she made some records of duets. Both marriages ended in divorce. She had no children, but in her autobiography admitted that she was once pressured into undergoing a certain "medical procedure" to terminate a pregnancy.

Paris was Eames' main place of residence during the 1920s and early '30s. She moved to New York City in 1936, where she gave vocal tuition. She became fond, too, of attending Broadway shows for relaxation. Eames died in 1952, after a protracted illness, aged 86 in her Manhattan home. She is buried in Oak Grove Cemetery in Bath, Maine. Her niece, actress Clare Eames, was the first wife of the noted playwright and Academy Award-winning screenwriter Sidney Howard.

Eames left an estate of $503,157 (equivalent to $5.96 million in 2024).
