= Sidney Howard =

American writer (1891–1939)

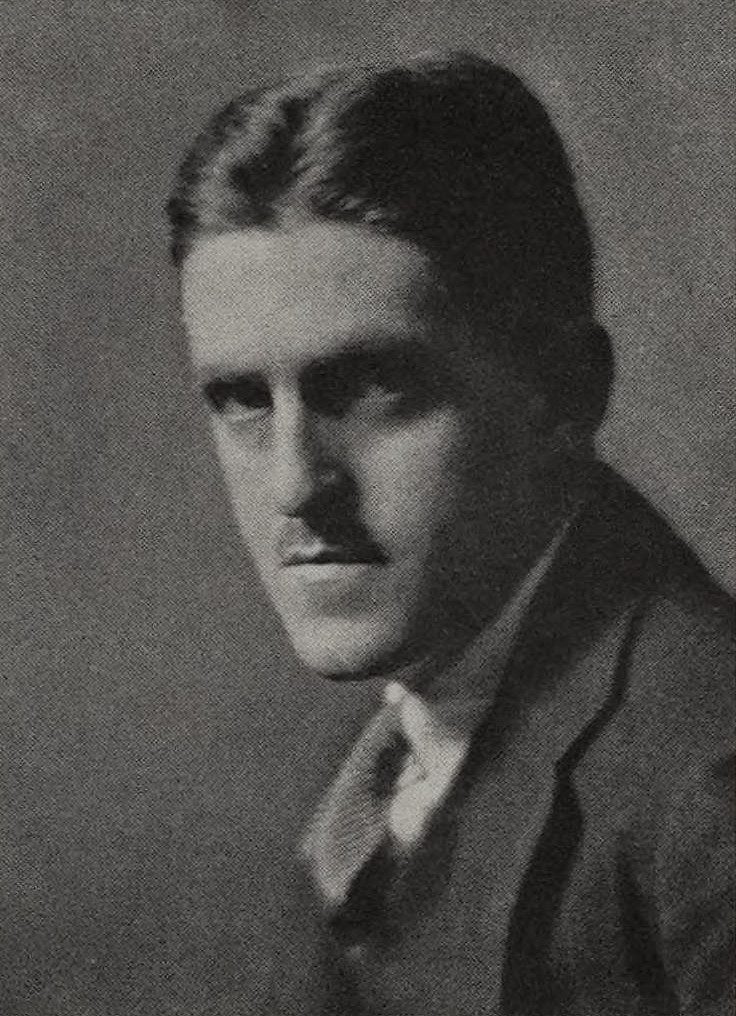
- Howard in 1925
- Born: Sidney Coe Howard; June 26, 1891; Oakland, California, U.S.
- Died: August 23, 1939 (aged 48); Tyringham, Massachusetts, U.S.
- Education: University of California, Berkeley (BA); Harvard University
- Occupations: Playwright, screenwriter
- Spouses: Clare Eames (m. 1922; died 1930) Polly Damrosch (m. 1931)
- Children: Jennifer Howard
- Relatives: Descendants of Robert Coe
- Writing career
- Notable awards: Pulitzer Prize for Drama (1925)

Sidney Coe Howard (June 26, 1891 – August 23, 1939) was an American playwright and screenwriter. He received the Pulitzer Prize for Drama in 1925 and a posthumous Academy Award in 1940 for the screenplay for Gone with the Wind.

== Early life ==
Howard was born in Oakland, California, the son of Helen Louise (née Coe) and John L. Howard. John was the councilman of Oakland and the President of several companies, including the Western Fuel Company, which succeeded the Hudson's Bay Company. Helen was a professional organist and piano teacher. Howard's paternal grandfather emigrated from Antrim, Ireland, in 1848, settling in Philadelphia. Howard's father and maternal grandfather helped open up the Pacific Northwest and Alaska to the shipping trade. Helen was the granddaughter of Nathaniel Coe. They are descended from Robert Coe, a 17th-century colonist who migrated to America from England.

Howard graduated from the University of California, Berkeley in 1915 and went on to Harvard University to study playwriting under George Pierce Baker in his legendary "47 workshop." (Other alumni of Baker's class included Eugene O'Neill, Thomas Wolfe, Philip Barry and S. N. Behrman. Howard became good friends with Behrman.)

Along with other students of Harvard professor A. Piatt Andrew, Howard volunteered with Andrew's American Field Service, serving in France and the Balkans during World War I. After the war, Howard made use of his proficiency at foreign languages and translated a number of literary works from French, Spanish, Hungarian, and German. A liberal intellectual whose politics became progressively more left-wing over the years, he also wrote articles about labor issues for The New Republic and served as literary editor for the original Life Magazine.

== Career ==
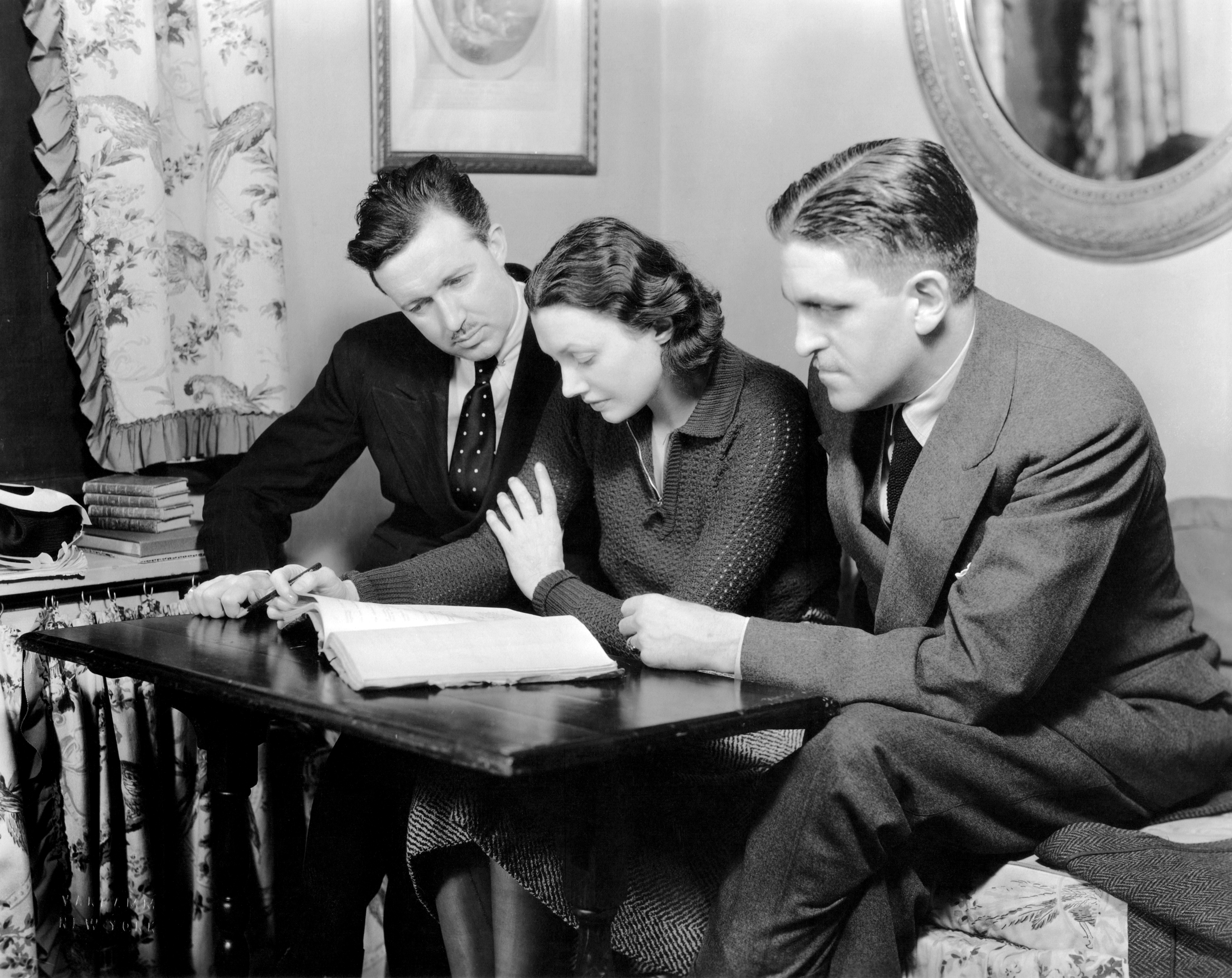
Sidney Howard (right), Guthrie McClintic and Katharine Cornell were photographed in Cornell's dressing room at the Belasco Theatre, studying Howard's play Alien Corn. Directed by McClintic, Cornell's production of the play opened February 20, 1933.

In 1921, Howard's first play was produced on Broadway. A neo-romantic verse drama set in the time of Dante, Swords, did not do well with audiences or critics. It was with his realistic romance They Knew What They Wanted three years later that Howard established his reputation as a serious writer. The story of a middle-aged Italian vineyard owner who woos a young woman by mail with a false snapshot of himself, marries her, and then forgives her when she becomes pregnant by one of his farm hands, the play was praised for its un-melodramatic view of adultery and its tolerant approach to its characters. Theater critic Brooks Atkinson called it "a tender, original, merciful drama." They Knew What They Wanted won the 1925 Pulitzer Prize for Drama, was adapted three times into film (1928, 1930, and 1940) and later became the Broadway musical, The Most Happy Fella. Howard's career was anything but consistent. For every successful play he wrote, he saw several others close without making any money. His saving grace was that he was a remarkably prolific writer. Lucky Sam McCarver, his next play, was an unsentimental account of the marriage of a New York speakeasy owner on his way up in the world with a self-destructive socialite on her way down. It failed to attract audiences, though it won the admiration of some reviewers.

With 1926's The Silver Cord, starring Laura Hope Crews, Howard had a major hit. This drama about a mother who is pathologically close to her sons and works to undermine their romances, the result of a decade fascinated with Freud, Oedipal complexes, and family dysfunction. Both Howard's works The Silver Cord and Ned McCobb's Daughter ran on alternate weeks in the 1926–1927 season, produced by the Theatre Guild. The Silver Cord is also the only original play by Howard to outlive its era. (His 1929 adaptation S.S. Tenacity is periodically revived.) The play was occasionally staged by regional theater companies through the late twentieth century, and its first off-Broadway production was mounted in 2013. The 1933 film of the play starred Irene Dunne and Joel McCrea, with Laura Hope Crews reprising her stage role.

By 1930, Howard was "one of the most dashing figures on the Broadway scene." A prolific writer and a founding member of the Playwrights' Company (with Maxwell Anderson, S. N. Behrman, Elmer Rice, Robert Sherwood, and John F. Wharton) he ultimately wrote or adapted more than seventy plays; a consummate theater professional, he also directed and produced a number of works.

In 1922, Howard married actress Clare Eames (1896–1930), who had played the female lead in Swords. She later starred in Howard's Lucky Sam McCarver (1925) and Ned McCobb's Daughter (1926) on Broadway and The Silver Cord in London (1927). The couple separated in 1927, and Howard's anger at the disintegration of his marriage is reflected in his bitter satire of modern matrimony, Half Gods (1929).

A particular admirer of the understated realism of French playwright Charles Vildrac, Howard adapted two of his plays into English, under the titles S.S. Tenacity (1929) and Michael Auclair (1932). One of his greatest successes on Broadway was an adaptation of a French comedy by René Fauchois, The Late Christopher Bean. Yellow Jack, a historical drama about the war against yellow fever, was praised for its high-minded purpose and innovative staging when it premiered in 1934.

"In his thinking, Howard was very much a man of his time," Brooks Atkinson wrote. "He was a Wilsonian; he brooded on the tragedy of the League of Nations. He intended to write an ironic tragedy on the theme of the destruction of such a league that would be devoted to the service rather than the conquest of humanity, [using the techniques] that made Yellow Jack such a forceful drama."

Hired by Samuel Goldwyn, Howard worked in Hollywood at MGM and wrote several successful screenplays. Despite his well-known left-wing political sympathies (he supported William Foster, the Communist Party candidate for president, in 1932), he became a shrewd Hollywood insider. In 1932, Howard was nominated for an Academy Award for his adaptation of the Sinclair Lewis novel Arrowsmith and again in 1936 for Dodsworth, which he had adapted for the stage in 1934. He wrote a screenplay as well for Lewis's most political book, the anti-Fascist novel It Can't Happen Here. The film was never made. (Studio officials claimed production-cost issues, but Howard maintained that the politics of the script were the issue.) Sinclair Lewis was a great admirer of Howard's stage work and was pleased with his three film adaptations, and the two men (whose political opinions aligned) became good friends.

In 1935, Howard wrote the Broadway stage adaptation of Humphrey Cobb's novel Paths of Glory. With its unsparing depictions of battlefield brutality, the play failed at the box office. As a World War I veteran, however, Howard believed it necessary to show the horrors of armed conflict. Convinced that the novel should be filmed one day, Howard wrote, "It seems to me that our motion picture industry must feel something of a sacred obligation to make the picture." The film version of the novel, directed by Stanley Kubrick, did not appear until 1957. Howard's screenplay for Gone with the Wind echoed Paths of Glory with an unflinching look at the cost of war.

After two Academy Award nominations and the Broadway success of Dodsworth, Sidney Howard was at the height of his fame in the late 1930s and appeared on the cover of Time magazine on June 7, 1937.

Howard was the posthumous winner of the 1939 Academy Award for an adapted screenplay for Gone with the Wind. (He was the only writer honored for the writing of that screenplay, despite the fact that his script was revised by several other writers.) This was the first time a posthumous nominee for any Oscar won the award.

Howard was also an advocate for writers' rights in the theatrical industry. In 1935, he served as the sixth president of the Dramatists Guild of America.

== Personal life ==
Three years after their separation, Clare Eames died unexpectedly in 1930. She was the niece of opera singer Emma Eames on her father's side, and of the inventor Hiram Percy Maxim on her mother's side, and a granddaughter of former Maryland governor William Thomas Hamilton. Howard and Eames had one child, a daughter, Jennifer Howard (1925–1993), who became an actress.

The following year in 1931, Howard married Leopoldine "Polly" Damrosch, youngest daughter of American conductor and composer Walter Damrosch. The couple had a son, Walter Damrosch Howard, and two daughters, Lady Sidney Howard Urquhart, and Margaret Howard.

His first daughter, Jennifer, married Samuel Goldwyn Jr. in 1950, with whom she had three sons: business executive Francis Goldwyn, actor Tony Goldwyn, and studio executive John Goldwyn.

== Death ==
Howard died in the summer of 1939 at the age of 48 in Tyringham, Massachusetts while working on his 700-acre farm. A lover of the quiet rural life, Howard spent as much time on his farm as possible when he was not in New York or Hollywood. He was crushed to death in a garage by his two-and-a-half ton tractor. He had turned the ignition switch on and was cranking the engine to start it when it lurched forward, pinning him against the wall of the garage. "His death was a Broadway calamity," Atkinson wrote. "Broadway and the Playwrights' Company lost one of its most admirable people...in the midst of an active career and full of ideas for more plays." In his 2007 history of Broadway playwrights, Ethan Mordden wrote, "When he found his metier, Howard excelled at edgy American stories about charismatic but somewhat unlikable people. He seemed to enjoy testing his public; or perhaps he simply saw the world as being filled with rogues..."

At the time of his death, Howard was working on a dramatization of Carl van Doren's biography of Benjamin Franklin. He is buried in the Tyringham Cemetery.

== Legacy ==
Howard left behind a number of unproduced works. Lute Song, an adaptation of an old Chinese play co-written with Will Irwin, premiered on Broadway in 1946. A lighthearted reworking of the Faust legend, Madam, Will You Walk? closed out of town when produced by the Playwrights' Company in 1939, but was more warmly received as the first production of the Phoenix Theatre in 1953.

Shortly after his death his colleagues at the Playwrights' Company founded in his honor the Sidney Howard Memorial Award. The award consisted of a prize of $1,500 given to a young playwright without notable successes who had shown promise in a New York production. The inaugural prize was given to Robert Ardrey in recognition of his play Thunder Rock.

Howard was posthumously inducted into the American Theatre Hall of Fame in 1981.

== Selected works ==
- Swords (1921)
- They Knew What They Wanted (1924)
- Lucky Sam Carver (1925)
- Ned McCobb's Daughter (1926)
- The Silver Cord (1926)
- Half Gods (1929)
- S.S. Tenacity (1929): adaptation
- Marseilles (1930)
- Arrowsmith (1931): adaptation
- Michel Auclair (1932): adaptation
- Yellow Jack (1934)
- Dodsworth (1934)
- Ode to Liberty (1934)
- Paths of Glory (1935): adaptation
- The Ghost of Yankee Doodle (1937)
- Gone With The Wind (1939) (Screenplay of Margaret Mitchell's work of the same name) (posthumous Academy Award for Best Adaptation)

== See also ==
- List of ambulance drivers during World War I

== Sources ==
- Atkinson, Brooks. Broadway. New York: Atheneum, 1970.
- Berg, A. Scott. Goldwyn: A Biography. New York: Riverhead, 1998.
- Gewirtz, Arthur. Sidney Howard and Clare Eames: American Theater's Perfect Couple of the 1920s. Jefferson, MO: McFarland Publishers, 2004. ISBN 0-7864-1751-X
