= Rex Ingram (director) =

Irish film director (1893–1950)

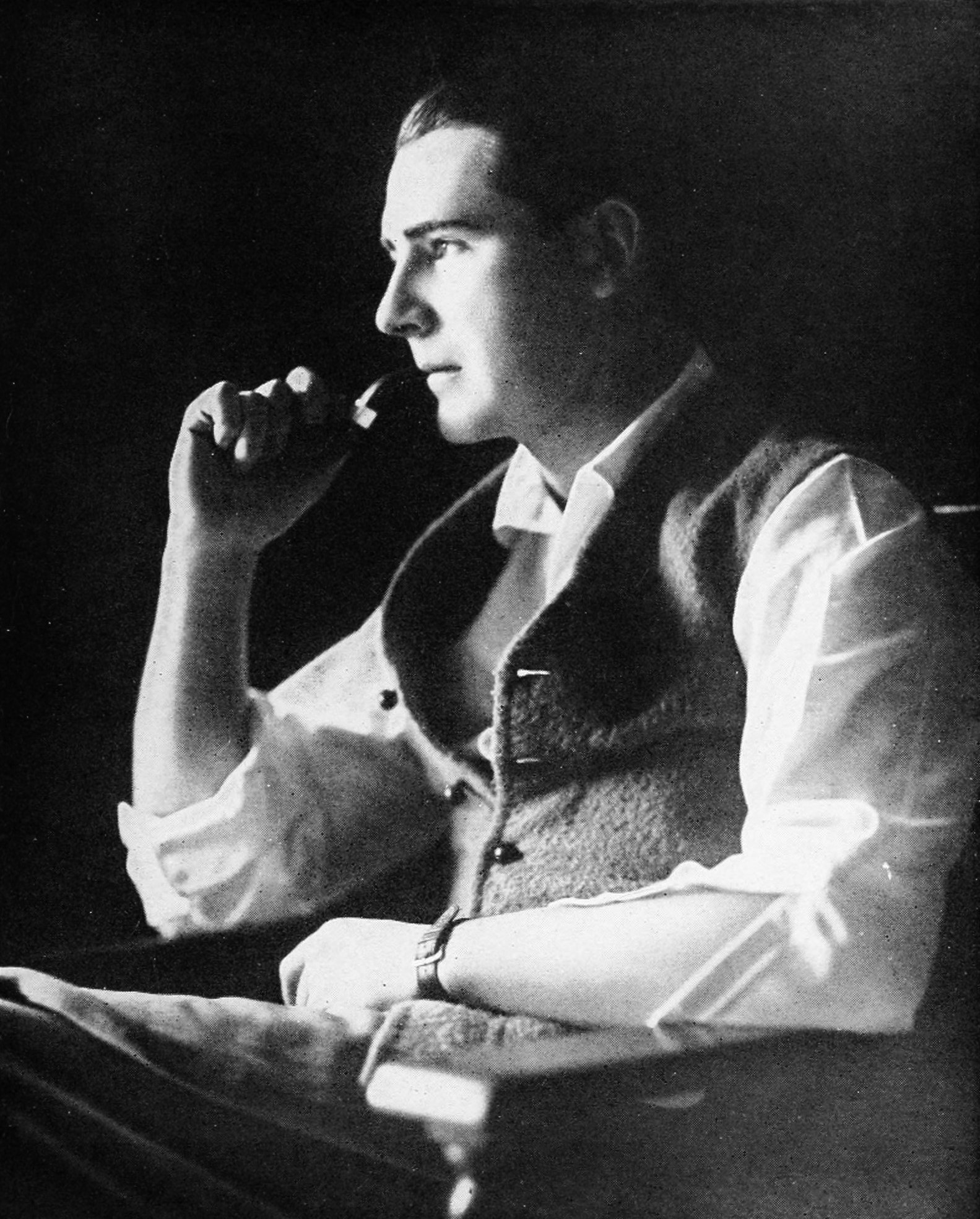
- Ingram, c. 1920
- Born: Reginald Ingram Montgomery Hitchcock; 15 January 1893; Dublin, Ireland
- Died: 21 July 1950 (aged 57); North Hollywood, California, U.S.
- Other name: Rex Hitchcock
- Education: Yale University
- Occupations: Film director, producer, writer and actor
- Years active: 1913–1933
- Employer(s): Edison Studios; Fox Film Corporation; Vitagraph Studios; MGM; Metro Pictures; Gaumont British
- Known for: Broken Fetters (1916); The Four Horsemen of the Apocalypse (1921); Scaramouche (1923); The Magician (1926); The Three Passions (1929)
- Spouses: Doris Pawn (m. 1917; div. 1920) Alice Terry (m. 1921)
- Relatives: Francis Clere Hitchcock (brother)
- Honors: Star on the Hollywood Walk of Fame at 1651 Vine Street

Rex Ingram (born Reginald Ingram Montgomery Hitchcock; 15 January 1893 – 21 July 1950) was an Irish film director, producer, writer, and actor. Director Erich von Stroheim once called him "the world's greatest director".

== Early life ==
Born 15 January 1893 in 58 Grosvenor Square, Rathmines, Dublin, Ireland, (where a plaque commemorates his birth), Ingram was educated at Saint Columba's College, near Rathfarnham, County Dublin. He spent much of his adolescence living in the Old Rectory, Kinnitty, Birr, County Offaly, where his father, Reverend Francis Hitchcock, was the Church of Ireland rector. Ingram emigrated to the United States in 1911.

His brother Francis joined the British Army and fought during World War I, during which he was awarded the Military Cross.

== Career ==
Ingram studied sculpture at the Yale University School of Art, where he contributed to campus humour magazine The Yale Record. He soon moved into film, first taking acting work in 1913 and then writing, producing and directing. His first work as producer-director was in 1916 on the romantic drama The Great Problem. He worked for Edison Studios, Fox Film Corporation, Vitagraph Studios, and then MGM, directing mainly action or supernatural films.

He moved to Metro in 1920, where he was under the supervision of executive June Mathis. Mathis and Ingram would go on to make four films together: Hearts Are Trumps, The Four Horsemen of the Apocalypse, The Conquering Power, and Turn to the Right. It is believed the two were romantically involved. Ingram and Mathis had begun to grow distant when her new find, Rudolph Valentino, began to overshadow Ingram's own fame. Their relationship ended when Ingram eloped with Alice Terry in 1921.

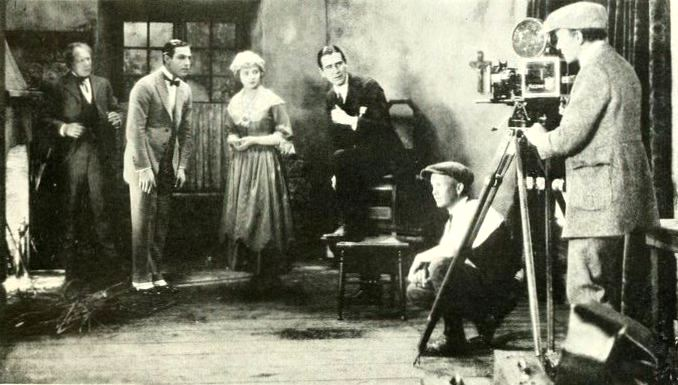
Ingram at work with Ralph Lewis, Rudolph Valentino, and his wife, Alice Terry, on the set of The Conquering Power

Ingram married twice, first to actress Doris Pawn in 1917; this ended in divorce in 1920. He then married Alice Terry in 1921, with whom he remained for the rest of his life. Both marriages were childless. He and Terry relocated to the French Riviera in 1923. They formed a small studio in Nice and made several films on location in North Africa, Spain, and Italy, for MGM and others.

Among those who worked for Ingram at MGM on the Riviera during this period was the young Michael Powell, who later directed (with Emeric Pressburger) The Red Shoes and other classics, and technician Leonti Planskoy. By Powell's own account, Ingram was a major influence on him, especially in regard to the themes of illusion, dreaming, magic and the surreal. David Lean said he was indebted to Ingram. MGM studio chief Dore Schary listed the top creative people in Hollywood as D. W. Griffith, Ingram, Cecil B. DeMille and Erich von Stroheim (in declining order of importance).

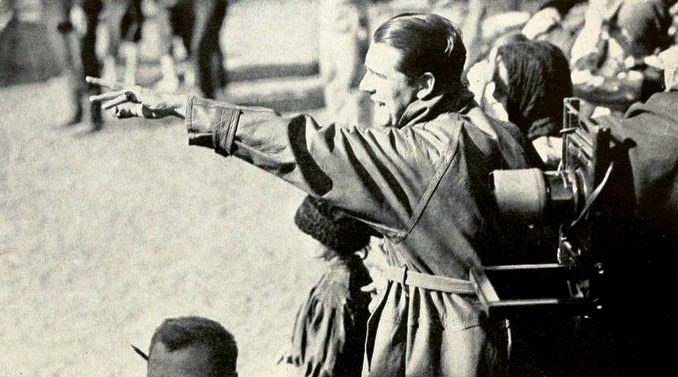
Ingram working on the set of The Four Horsemen of the Apocalypse

Carlos Clarens writes: "As Rex Ingram's films became more esoteric, his career declined. The coming of sound forced him to relinquish his studios in Nice. Rather than equip them for talking pictures, he chose instead to travel and pursue a writing career."

Ingram made only one sound film: Baroud, filmed for Gaumont British Pictures in Morocco. The film was not a commercial success; he then left the movie business, returning to Los Angeles to work as a sculptor and writer.

Ingram converted to Islam in 1933, having been interested in the religion since as early as 1927.

For his contribution to the motion picture industry, he has a star on the Hollywood Walk of Fame at 1651 Vine Street.

== Death ==
Ingram died of a cerebral hemorrhage in North Hollywood on 21 July 1950, aged 58. He was interred in the Forest Lawn Memorial Park Cemetery in Glendale, California.

== Legacy ==
Critic Carlos Clarens wrote of Ingram: "A full-blown Irishman fascinated by the bizarre and the grotesque (he once employed a dwarf as a valet), Ingram was also a writer of some talent. Frequently pedestrian and pretentious, Ingram's films nevertheless contain splendid flashes of macabre fantasy, such as the ride of the Four Horsemen in the Valentino epic, or the 'ghoul visions' that bring about the death of the miser in The Conquering Power. His more or less mystical bent was apparent in Mare Nostrum and The Garden of Allah, which he filmed in the Mediterranean and North Africa, respectively."

== Filmography ==
Year	Films	Credit	Notes
1914	The Symphony of Souls	Director	Survival status unknown, one-reel Short film
1915	The Song of Hate	Scenario	Lost Film
1916	The Great Problem	Director, Scenario	Extant at MoMA
1916	Broken Fetters	Director, Scenario	Lost Film
1916	The Chalice of Sorrow	Director, Scenario	Extant at UCLA and Filmarchiv Austria
1917	Black Orchids	Director, Scenario	Lost Film
1917	The Little Terror	Director, Scenario	Lost Film
1917	The Reward of the Faithless	Director, Scenario (with E. Magnus Ingleton)	Survival status unknown
1917	The Pulse of Life	Director, Scenario (with E. Magnus Ingleton)	Lost Film
1917	The Flower of Doom	Director, Scenario	Extant at UCLA and Eastman House
1918	His Robe of Honor	Director	Lost Film
1918	Humdrum Brown	Director	Extant in part (more than one reel) at Eastman House
1919	The Day She Paid	Director	Lost Film
1920	Shore Acres	Director	Lost Film
1920	Under Crimson Skies	Director	Lost Film
1920	Hearts Are Trumps	Director	Lost Film
1921	The Four Horsemen of the Apocalypse	Director, Producer	Extant, preserved by the Library of Congress
1921	The Conquering Power	Director, Producer	Extant
1922	The Prisoner of Zenda	Director, Producer	Extant
1922	Trifling Women	Director, Scenario, Producer	Lost Film
1922	Turn to the Right	Director	Extant at Eastman House
1923	Scaramouche	Director, Producer	Extant
1923	Where the Pavement Ends	Director, Scenario	Lost Film
1924	The Arab	Director, Scenario	Extant at Gosfilmofond and at Cinematek
1926	Mare Nostrum	Director, Producer	Extant
1926	The Magician	Director, Scenario, Producer	Extant
1927	The Garden of Allah	Director, Producer	Extant in part
1928	The Three Passions	Director, Screenwriter, Producer	Extant, First Sound Film
1932	Baroud	Director, Screenwriter (with Peter Spencer,Benno Vigny, and André Jaeger-Schmidt, Producer, Actor	Extant, Final Film
