= Clare Eames =

American actress and stage director (1894–1930)

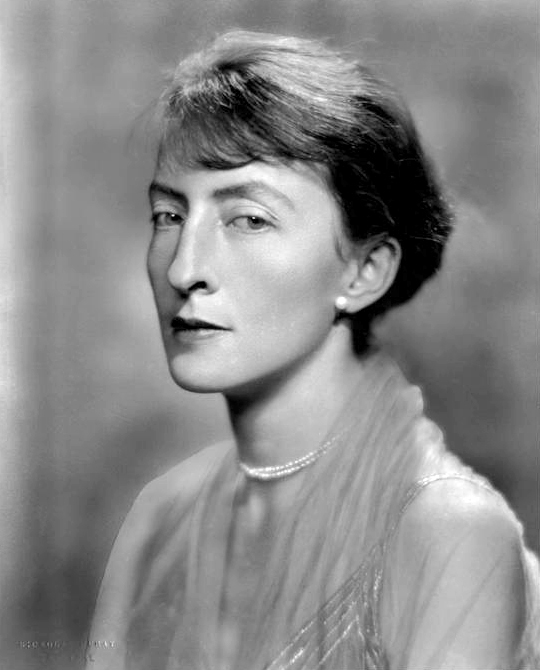
- Eames in 1925
- Born: August 5, 1894; Hartford, Connecticut, U.S.
- Died: November 8, 1930 (aged 36); Richmond, London, England
- Occupation: Actress
- Years active: 1918–1930
- Spouse: Sidney Howard (m. 1922)
- Children: Clare Eames Howard
- Relatives: Emma Eames (aunt)

Clare Eames (August 5, 1894 – November 8, 1930) was an American actress and stage director, and the first wife of playwright Sidney Howard.

== Early years ==
Eames was born August 5, 1894, in Hartford, Connecticut, the daughter of Clare (Hamilton) and Hayden Eames. Her maternal grandfather was Maryland governor and senator William Thomas Hamilton. Her aunt was American soprano Emma Eames.

Eames' family moved to Cleveland, Ohio when she was 11 years old. From there, she went to Paris to live with her aunt and studied drama. She attended the American Academy of Dramatic Arts.

== Career ==
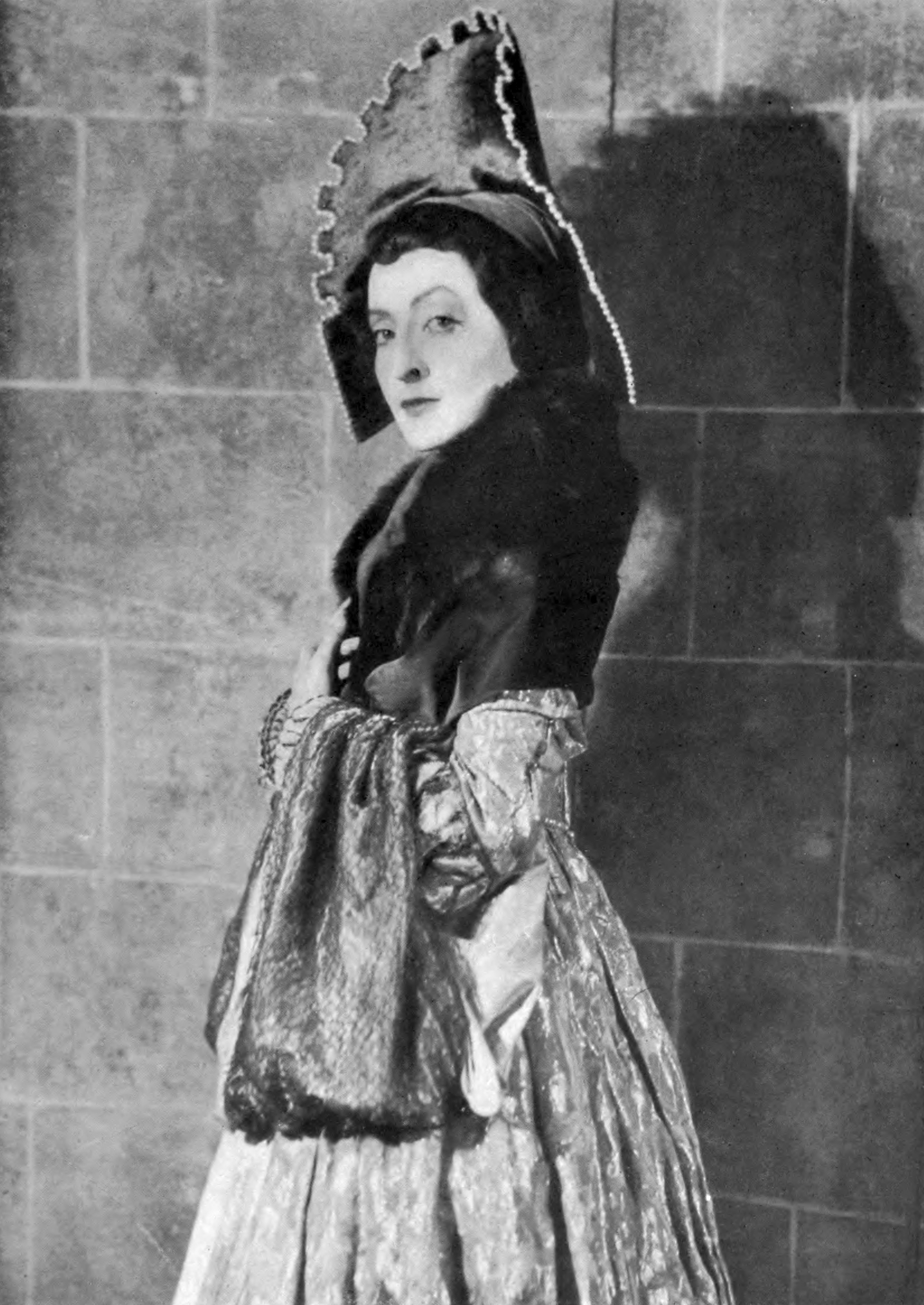
Clare Eames as Princess Elizabeth in Amélie Rives' stage adaptation of Mark Twain's The Prince and the Pauper (1920)

In 1919, Eames joined the repertory theatre headed by Ethel Barrymore.

After World War I, Eames was considered one of the leading new female lights of the Broadway stage, performing classical roles in plays by Shakespeare and George Bernard Shaw. She made her stage debut in 1918. As a virtual unknown on Broadway, she won acclaim for her performance as the young Princess Elizabeth in a 1920 stage adaptation of Mark Twain's The Prince and the Pauper. After her starring role in John Drinkwater's one-act play Mary Stuart (1921), Eames quickly rose to the top rank in the American theatre.

Eames made a handful of silent pictures, but died before having the opportunity to appear in sound films.

== Personal life ==
Eames was engaged to Lieutenant Philip Livingston Rose, who was killed in action on October 6, 1918.

In 1922 Eames married playwright Sidney Howard. He divorced her in March 1930 after she had moved to England. He was awarded custody of their young daughter Clare, later known as Jennifer Howard.

== Death ==
She died November 8, 1930, at a hospital in Richmond, London, England, following surgery. She was 36.

== Theatre credits ==
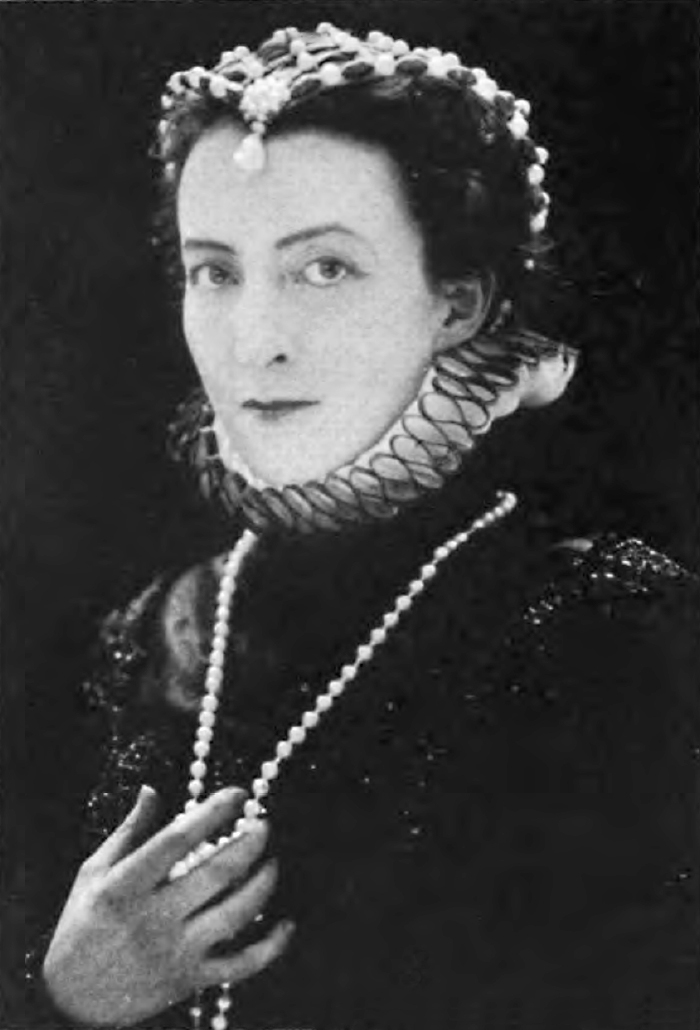
Clare Eames in the Broadway production of John Drinkwater's Mary Stuart (1921)

Date	Title	Role	Notes
April–May 1918	The Big Scene		Greenwich Village Theatre, New York City
October 6, 1919 – May 1920	Déclassée	Lady Wildering	Empire Theatre, New York City
November 1, 1920 – March 1921	The Prince and the Pauper	Princess Elizabeth	Booth Theatre, New York City
March 21 – April 1921	Mary Stuart	Mary Stuart	Ritz Theatre, New York City
March 21 – April 1921	Man About Town		Ritz Theatre, New York City
September 1–?, 1921	Swords	Fiamma	National Theatre, New York City
March 13 – April 1922	The First Fifty Years	Ann Wells	Princess Theatre, New York City
November 1923	The Spook Sonata	The Mummy	Provincetown Playhouse, New York City
February 3 – June 1924	Fashion	Mrs. Tiffany	Provincetown Playhouse, New York City
March 15 – April 1924	Macbeth	Lady Macbeth	48th Street Theatre, New York City
May 16–?, 1924	Hedda Gabler	Hedda Tesman	48th Street Theatre, New York City
September 27 – November 1924	The Little Angel	Sarah Bornemissza	Frazee Theatre, New York City
December 24, 1924 – April 1925	Candida	Miss Proserpine Garnett	48th Street Theatre, New York City
February 24 – May 1925	The Wild Duck		Director (with Dudley Digges); 48th Street Theatre, New York City
October 21 – November 14, 1925	Lucky Sam McCarver	Carlotta Ashe	Playhouse Theatre, New York City
November 23, 1925 – January 1926	Androcles and the Lion	Lavinia	Klaw Theatre, New York City
November 23, 1925 – January 1926	The Man of Destiny	The Lady	Klaw Theatre, New York City
February 2–?, 1926	Little Eyolf	Mrs. Rita Allmers	Guild Theatre, New York City
October 11 – November 1926	Juarez and Maximillian	Carlotta	Guild Theatre, New York City
November 29, 1926 – April 1927	Ned McCobb's Daughter	Carrie Callahan	John Golden Theatre, New York City
January 3 – February 1927	The Brother Karamozov	Katerina Ivanova Verhovovtseva	Guild Theatre, New York City
September 13, 1927 – ?	The Silver Cord	Christina	St Martin's Theatre, London
January 22–23, 1928	The Unquiet Spirit	Marceline	Apollo Theatre, London
November 19 – December 10, 1928	The Sacred Flame	Nurse Wayland	Henry Miller's Theatre, New York City
January 28 – April 12, 1930	Milestones	Gertrude Rhead	Criterion Theatre, London
July 2–6, 1930	The Procurator of Judea		Producer; Little Theatre, London
August 27–30, 1930	John o' Dreams		Producer; Regent Theatre, London

== Filmography ==
Year	Title	Role	Notes
1924	Dorothy Vernon of Haddon Hall	Queen Elizabeth	
1925	The Swan	Princess Dominica	
1925	The New Commandment	Mrs. Parr	
1929	The Three Passions	Lady Bellamont	
