= Charles Felton Pidgin =

American author, statistician and inventor (1844–1923)

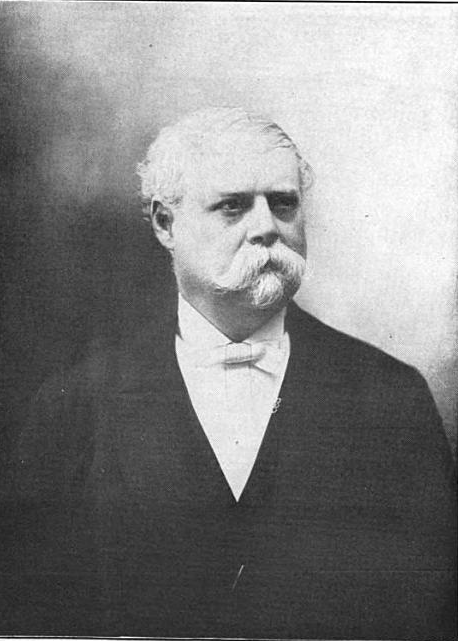
- Pidgin c. 1918
- Born: November 11, 1844; Roxbury, Massachusetts
- Died: June 3, 1923 (aged 78); Melrose Highlands, Massachusetts
- Occupations: Writer; statistician; inventor
- Spouse(s): Lizzie Abbott Dane; Lucy Sturtevant Gardner; Frances Fern Douglass
- Writing career
- Notable work: Quincy Adams Sawyer (1900)

Charles Felton Pidgin (November 11, 1844 – June 3, 1923) was an American author, statistician, and inventor. He is best known for his 1900 novel Quincy Adams Sawyer, which became successful largely due to a big marketing campaign, and was adapted for the stage and silent film.

== Biography ==
He was born on November 11, 1844, in Roxbury, Massachusetts, to Mary E. Felton and Benjamin Gordon Pidgin.

As a young child, Pidgin was rendered lame by an accident to his hip, and he was also partially blind for a number of years. He graduated from The English High School in Boston in 1863, and worked for ten years in the mercantile business. He was appointed chief clerk of the Massachusetts Bureau of Labor Statistics in 1873. In 1888 he independently published a book titled Practical Statistics. He was appointed as chief of the bureau in 1903, and remained there until 1907, leaving to focus on his writing work.

In addition to serving as a state statistician, Pidgin remained busy in many other pursuits. He invented statistical tabulating machines, and wrote songs and musical comedies. And he also became a fairly prolific author, for which he became best known.

On the stage, Pidgin's musical comedy adaptation of Peck's Bad Boy was first produced in 1883 and ran for many years.

His first and most popular novel Quincy Adams Sawyer was published in 1900 and sold over 250,000 copies. It was aggressively marketed by his publisher, C.M. Clark Publishing, run by Carro Clark, the wife of Pidgin's friend Charles Atkinson. It was adapted into a popular stage play in 1902, which toured widely and played at the Academy of Music in New York. The book was adapted to silent films of the same name in 1912 (by Puritan Special Features Company, of which little is known), and again in 1922 starring John Bowers, Blanche Sweet, Lon Chaney, and Barbara La Marr. Both films are considered lost.

Pidgin's next novel, Blennerhassett (1901), sold over 60,000 copies before even appearing in print.

Pidgin's 1902 novel The Climax: or, What Might Have Been: A Romance of the Great Republic envisioned an alternate history where Aaron Burr did not kill Alexander Hamilton, and later became president. Pidgin was an avid enthusiast of Burr, who he felt was wronged by history, and a number of his novels involve Burr.

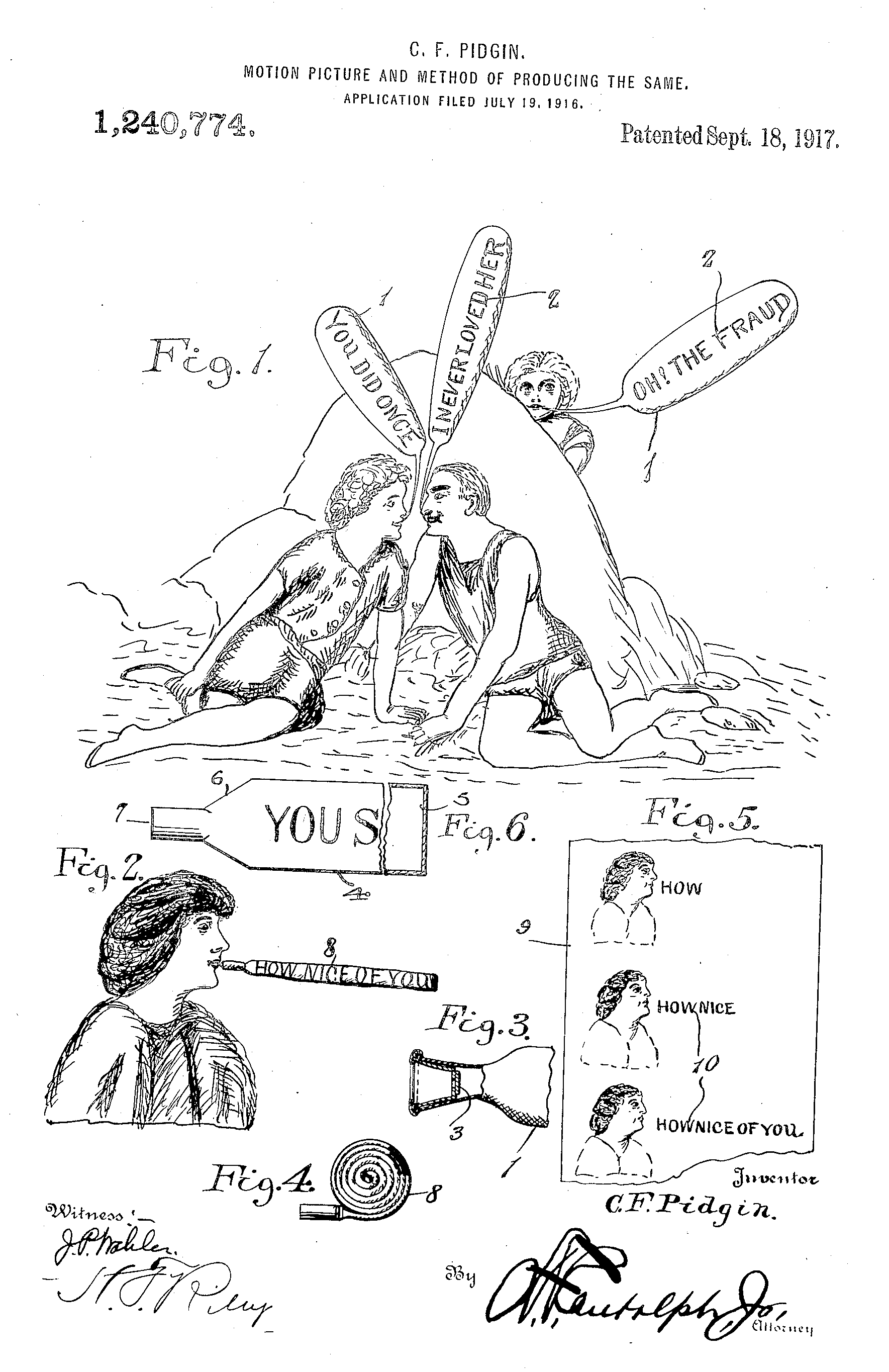
Illustration from 1916 U.S. Patent application showing Pidgin's proposal to display silent film dialogue using balloons

In 1916, Pidgin filed a patent application to display dialogue in silent films, proposing that actors inflate balloons or party favor-like objects with text on them to recreate the act of speaking. The idea never took off, and this proposal has only received modern attention as being a rather ludicrous idea.

Pidgin married three times. He married his first wife Lizzie Abbott Dane in 1867, and she died the following year. In 1873 he married Lucy Sturtevant Gardner, who became a doctor and practiced medicine until her death in 1896. His third wife, married in 1897, was Frances Fern Douglas. Pidgin died at his home in Melrose Highlands, Massachusetts, on June 3, 1923.

== List of novels ==
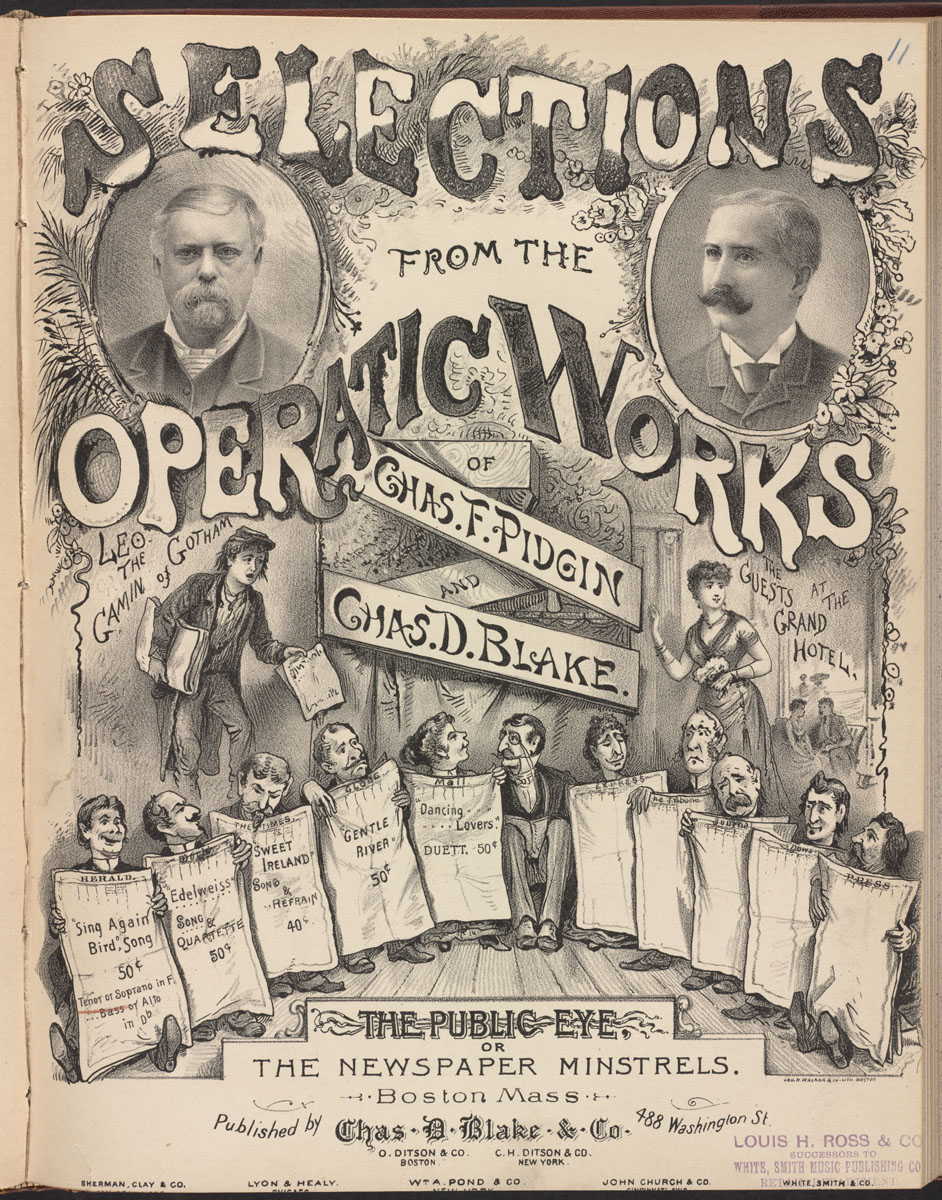
Cover of "Selections from the Operatic Works of Chas F. Pidgin and Chas D. Blake", 1889

- Quincy Adams Sawyer and Mason's Corner Folks (1900)
- Blennerhassett (1901)
- Stephen Holton (1902)
- The Climax (1902)
- The Letter H (1904)
- A Nation's Idol (1904)
- Little Burr, the Warwick of America (1905) (inspired by Jeremiah Clemens's The Rivals (1859))
- The Corsican Lovers (1906)
- Sarah Bernhardt Brown (1906)
- The Hidden Man (1906)
- The Toymakers (1907)
- Labor (1908)
- Theodosia (1908) (about Theodosia Burr Alston, daughter of Aaron Burr)
- The Further Adventures of Quincy Adams Sawyer and Mason Corner Folks (1909)
- The Chronicles of Quincy Adams Sawyer, detective (1912)
- The House of Shame (1912)
