= Carro Morrell Clark =

American publisher and businessperson

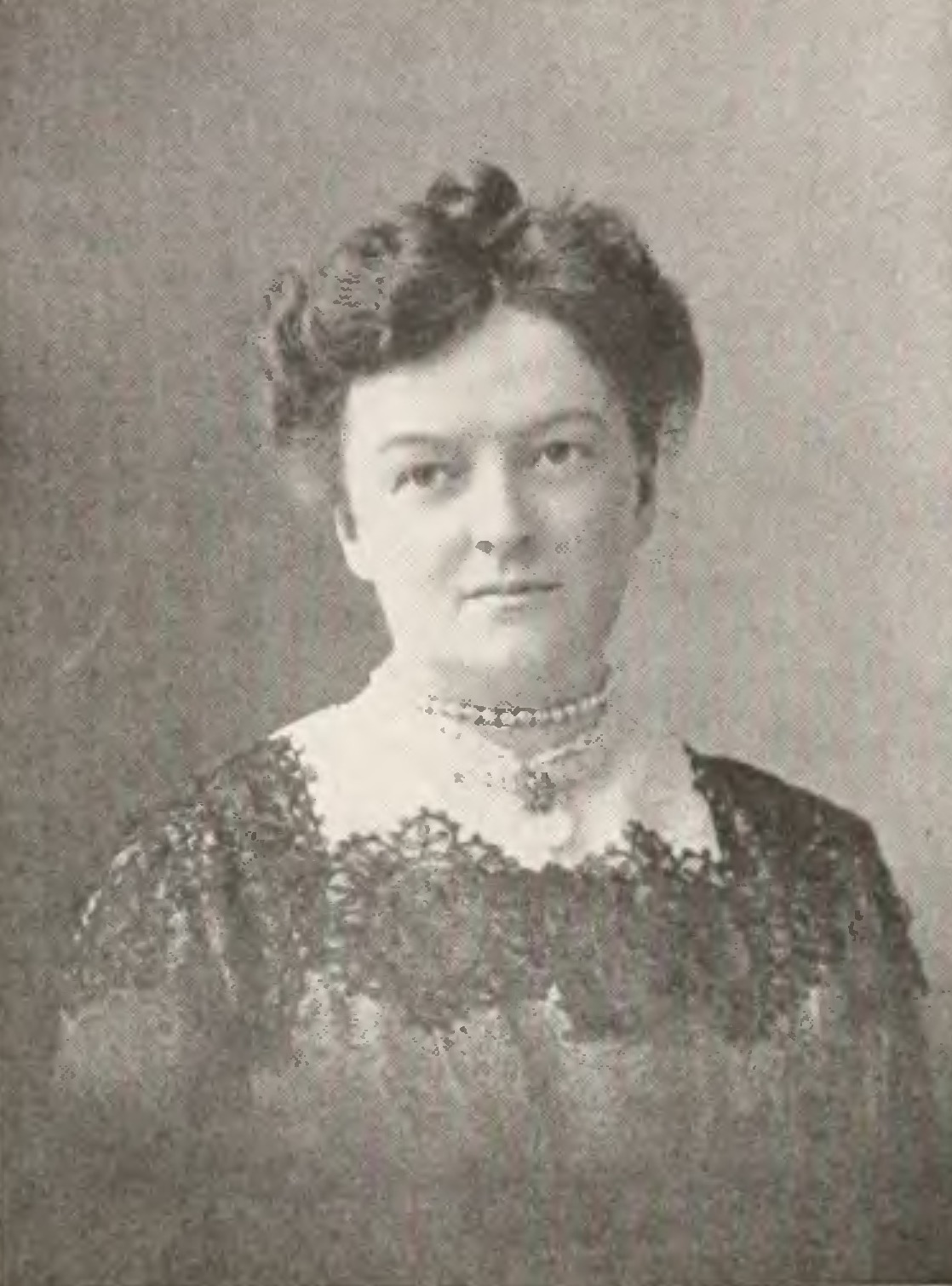
- Clark, circa 1904
- Born: September 6, 1867; Unity, Maine
- Died: February 16, 1950 (aged 82)
- Occupation: Publisher
- Spouses: Charles F. Atkinson (m. 1897; div. 1913); Leon H. Lempert, Jr. (m. 1914)

Carro Morrell Clark (pen name, Carro Frances Warren; after first marriage, Atkinson; after second marriage, Lempert; September 6, 1867 – February 16, 1950) was the founder and manager of the C. M. Clark Publishing Company, located in Boston, who, from 1900 through the end of 1906, was reported by some to be the only woman to publish books in the United States and some claimed in the world. The C. M. Clark Publishing Company operated from September 1900 to April 1912 and had its headquarters at 211 Tremont Street, Boston. The company's first release, Quincy Adams Sawyer and Mason's Corner Folks- A Story of New England Home Life by Charles Felton Pidgin, was aggressively marketed by Clark, and sold 500,000 copies. It was made into a play, a musical, and in 1922, a movie of the same title starring Lon Chaney and Blanche Sweet. Another book, Miss Petticoats (by Dwight Tilton, 1902), also went into theatrical production and was performed by, among others, Kathryn Osterman and the future film director, D.W. Griffith. In 1916, it was adapted as a silent film starring future Academy Award-winner Alice Brady.

== Biography ==
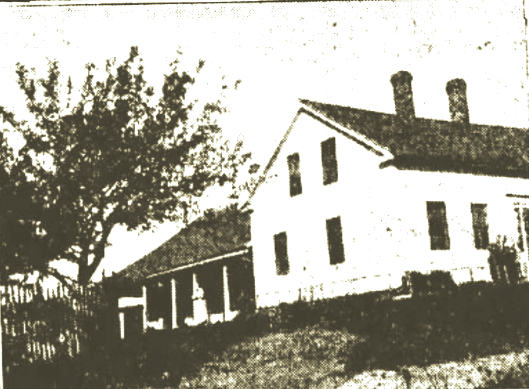
Childhood home (Unity, Maine, 1901)

Clark was born and raised on a farm in Unity, Maine. Her parents were Dudley Perley Clark and Lucy Ellen Warren. They had twelve children.

In 1892, she came to Boston and opened in her own name a book and stationery store in the Back Bay, where her patronage included from the start some of the most exclusive families of the city. She was sole owner and manager of this enterprise for about nine years.

Clark was acquainted with Charles Felton Pidgin, and partly from friendly motives, partly out of curiosity, went to hear the reading of his manuscript entitled "Quincy Adams Sawyer". Its fresh country atmosphere and its familiar, lovable country characters carried her thoughts to the old New England farm in Unity. Strongly impressed with the uniqueness of the love story and the natural Yankee humor in its characters and scenes, she came away from the reading convinced that it would be well worthwhile to publish this book.

In September, 1900, Clark organized the C. M. Clark Publishing Company of Boston, of which she was the head. This publishing house, in its first year of existence, achieved the distinction of producing two works of fiction both of which within one month from their publication were classed among the six best selling books throughout the U.S. The first was Quincy Adams Sawyer, which came out on November 3, 1900, and rapidly jumped into the class of books selling nearly 200,000 in less than one year from publication date. The second was the Aaron Burr romance entitled Blennerhassett, which was published on September 6, 1901, with a notable record — an advance sale of 60,000 copies before the publication date. In less than one week from the time it appeared in the bookstores, this book had become the best selling one in New York and Boston, and within a month, it was in the list of six best selling books in the U.S. As Christmas approached, Blennerhassett was being produced in editions of 20,000 copies, and the 125,000 mark was nearly reached in the time of two months.

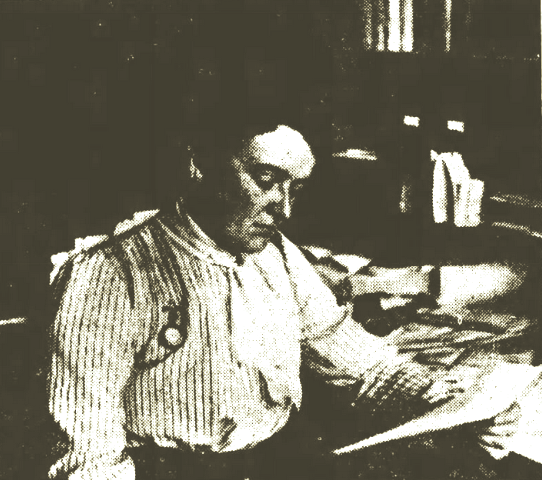
(1901)

With the great success and wide reputation of these two books, authors brought manuscripts to Clark from all parts of the country. Her publishing business assumed such proportions that in the fall of 1901, she took an extensive suite of offices in Brown Building, Dewey Square, Boston, where she transferred her business after disposing of her Back Bay store in the spring of that year. Greatly increasing business and plans for several new publications necessitated another change in March 1902, from which time the company occupied the entire floor at 211 Tremont Street.

In 1897, Carro married Charles F. Atkinson of Boston; they divorced in 1913. In 1914, she married the theater architect, Leon H. Lempert, Jr., of Rochester, New York.

She authored ten "Garden Series" children's books under the pen name "Carro Frances Warren".
