= Trifling Women =

1922 film by Rex Ingram

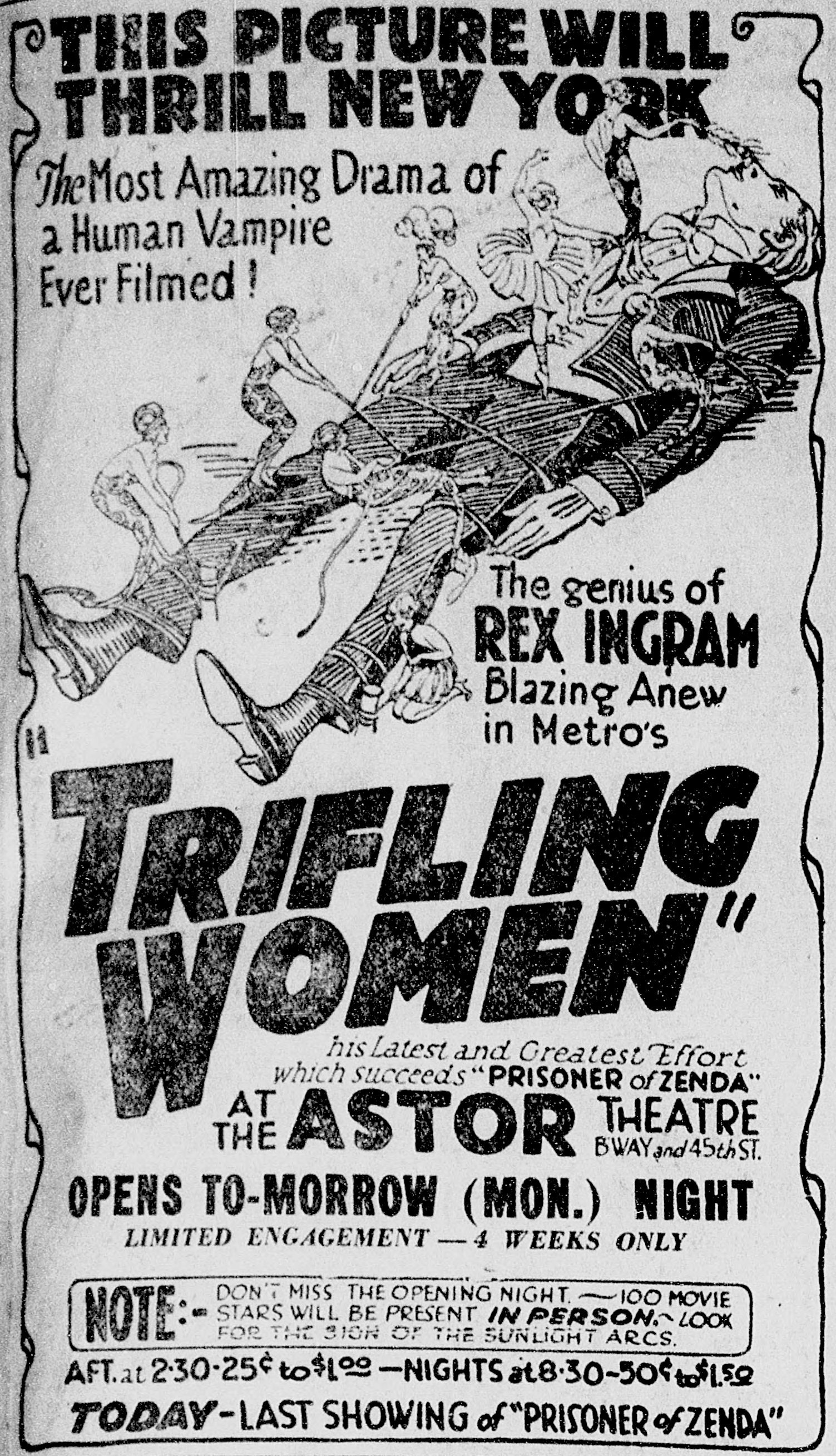
- A newspaper advertisement from the day before the opening night in New York.
- Directed by: Rex Ingram
- Written by: Rex Ingram
- Starring: Barbara La Marr; Ramón Novarro
- Cinematography: John F. Seitz
- Edited by: Grant Whytock
- Distributed by: Metro Pictures
- Release date: October 2, 1922 (New York)
- Running time: 9 reels (8,800 ft)
- Country: United States
- Language: Silent (English intertitles)
- Budget: $273,000

Trifling Women is a 1922 American silent romantic drama film directed by Rex Ingram. It is credited with boosting the careers of its leads, Barbara La Marr and Ramon Novarro. It has been described as Ingram's most personal film.

The film is considered lost.

== Plot ==
Leon de Severac is fed up with his daughter Jacqueline, who is constantly seducing men. Hoping to discourage her from her flirtatious behavior, he tells her the story of Zareda, an attractive fortune teller who is having an affair with Ivan de Maupin. Ivan's father, the Baron, lusts after her as well and Ivan eventually grows convinced that Zareda is cheating on him. Giving her up, he leaves for war shortly after. A short period later, Zareda finds out the Baron is about to poison Marquis Ferroni. Trying to save the marquis, she switches the wine glasses and the Baron dies instead.

The marquis, a powerful millionaire, is very grateful to Zareda and they soon marry. For a short period of time, Zareda is a happy woman, until the return of Ivan. Jealous, Ivan makes sure he is not giving the marquis any rest. It eventually leads to a duel, where the marquis is mortally wounded. As he is about to die, he notices his wife embracing Ivan. Realizing she is using her body to get what she wants, he uses his last seconds alive to kill them both.

The movie director, Michael Powell, described the film as: "Moonlight on tiger skins and blood dripping onto white faces, while sinister apes, poison and lust kept the plot rolling."

== Cast ==
- Barbara La Marr as Jacqueline de Séverac/Zareda
- Ramón Novarro as Henri/Ivan de Maupin
- Pomeroy Cannon as Léon de Séverac
- Edward Connelly as Baron François de Maupin
- Lewis Stone as The Marquis Ferroni
- Hughie Mack as Père Alphonse Bidondeau
- Eugene Pouyet as Col. Roybet
- John George as Achmet
- Jess Weldon as Caesar
- Bynunsky Hyman as Hassan

== Production ==
The film is a remake of the 1917 film Black Orchids, also directed by Rex Ingram. Back then, the studio thought the film was too erotic and did not encourage its release. Therefore, Ingram remade the film in 1922, making it "twice as erotic".

Trifling Women starred Barbara La Marr and Ramón Novarro, who were reteamed from The Prisoner of Zenda (1922), a highly successful film which was recently released. The reunion made the audience suspect they were a couple, but it was later revealed that they were no more than close friends.

The role La Marr played was specially written for the actress. Shortly before the film's release, Novarro's name, which was Ramon Samaniegos, was changed to 'Novarro'.

== Reception ==
Trifling Women premiered at the Astor Theatre in New York City on October 2, 1922, and had its general release on November 6. It received mixed reviews. Harrison's Report called it "an unquestionable masterpiece". On the other hand, the reviewer for Variety felt it was a let-down compared to The Prisoner of Zenda, and the New York Times called it "an impossible rigmarole".

Samuel Goldwyn saw an advance screening of the film and was especially impressed by Novarro. He offered him a contract of $2,000 a week. This would certainly have been a major career step, since his salary for Trifling Women was $125. Novarro refused, however, deciding to remain loyal to Ingram, who gave him his "big break", according to the actor.

When Trifling Women became a worldwide financial success, La Marr's salary was raised to $6,500 a week. She became a worldwide superstar, only surpassed in popularity by Gloria Swanson. Ingram later said that Trifling Women was the best movie he made. Although the film was criticized for not living up to its enormous budget, the director, story and actors' performances were praised.

Critic Carlos Clarens wrote of the film that it "contained enough poisoning, Satanism, and necrophilia to make it one of the commercial disasters of 1922."

== Preservation ==
Though some production stills survive, Trifling Women is believed to be lost.
