= Bobbie of the Ballet =

1916 film

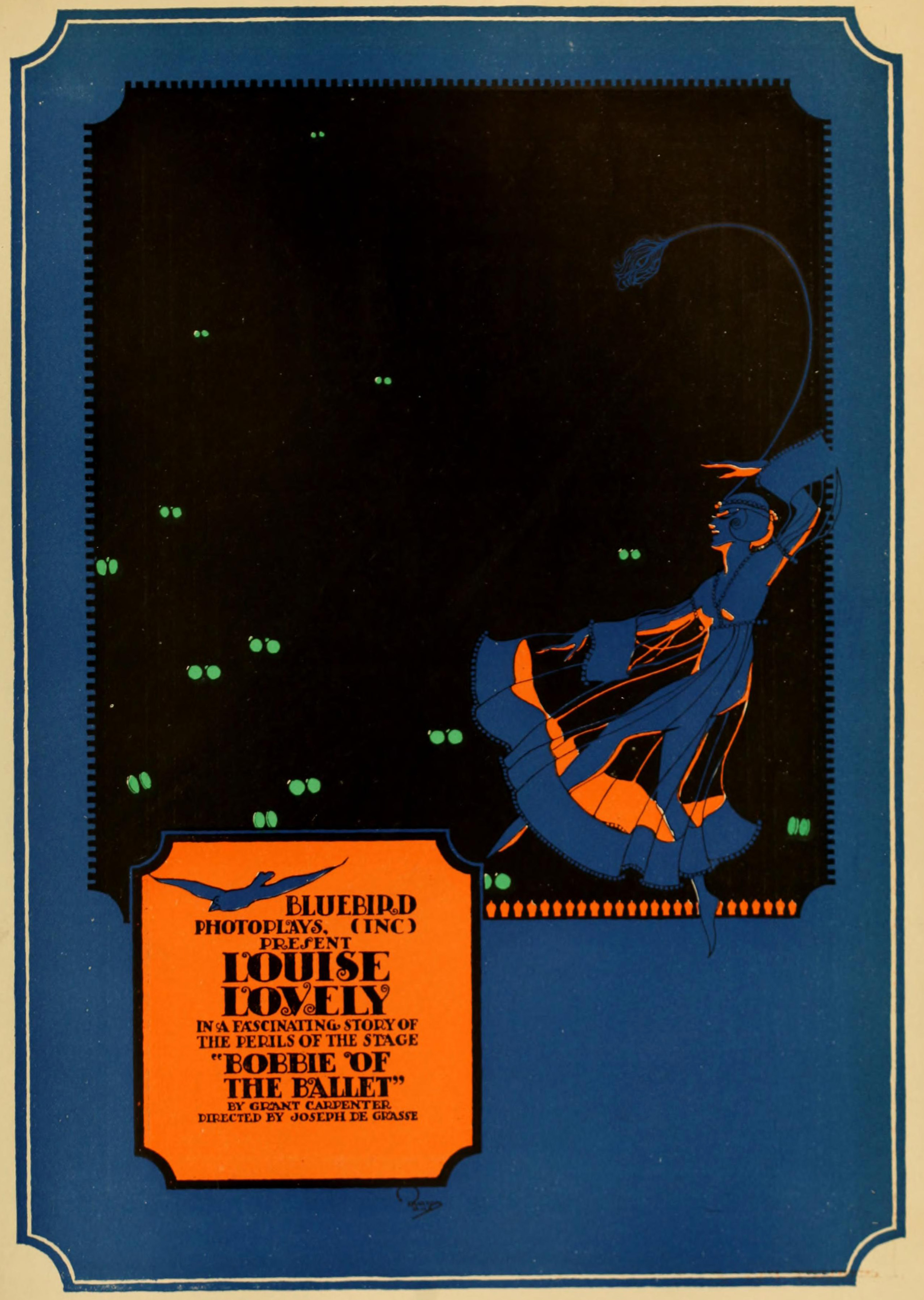
- Film poster
- Directed by: Joe De Grasse
- Written by: Ida May Park (screenplay); Grant Carpenter (story)
- Produced by: Bluebird Film Co.
- Starring: Lon Chaney; Louise Lovely; Jay Belasco; Gretchen Lederer
- Cinematography: George Kull
- Production company: Bluebird Photoplays
- Distributed by: Bluebird Photoplays
- Release date: June 12, 1916
- Running time: 5 reels (50 minutes)
- Country: United States
- Language: Silent (English intertitles)

Bobbie of the Ballet is a 1916 American silent drama film directed by Joe De Grasse and starring Lon Chaney, Louise Lovely, Gretchen Lederer and Jay Belasco. It was written by Ida May Park, based on a story by Grant Carpenter.

Actress Louise Emmons later co-starred in several other Chaney films, including The Blackbird, The Unknown and West of Zanzibar. John George later appeared in five other Chaney films, including The Road to Mandalay and The Unknown. A still from this lost film can be seen online.

== Plot ==
Bobbie Brent is a ballet dancer working as a chorus girl in a Broadway musical company, helping her old widowed mother to raise Bobbie's younger brother and sister in the tenements. Jack Stimson leaves his girlfriend Velma Vrooman to start a relationship with Bobbie, and Velma develops a hatred for her new competition. When Bobbie's mother dies, Bobbie dresses up as an old widow herself and pretends the children are hers, so that she can keep the courts from taking custody of her siblings. When her boyfriend Jack Stimson finds out it's not true, he breaks up with her. Jack's ex-girlfriend Velma sets up an appointment for Bobbie with a theatrical agent named Henry Fox, but secretly knows the man will try to take advantage of Bobbie. Jack comes to Bobbie's rescue as she is being assaulted by Fox, and Jack then realizes he still loves her. The courts try to take Bobbie's siblings away from her and put them in foster care, but Jack marries Bobbie so that she can persuade the courts that she is now able to provide financially for the two children. A sneak thief, "Hook" Hoover, who lives in the tenements, and offers to help Bobbie at one point by giving her money he obtained from a crime he committed.

== Cast ==
- Louise Lovely - Bobbie Brent, the ballet dancer
- Jay Belasco - Jack Stimson
- Jean Hathaway - Mrs. Stimson
- Gretchen Lederer - Velma Vrooman
- Gilmore Hammond - Henry Fox
- Lule Warrenton - Mrs. Hoover
- Lon Chaney - Hook Hoover, the thief
- Louise Emmons - Woman in the tenement (uncredited)
- John George - Man in the tenement (uncredited)

== Reception ==
"The only good thing about this offering is the fact that in a number of places we have some rather pleasing scenes in which the two little kiddies figure. Lon Chaney, as the reformed criminal, convinced with his work, but the assembling of the film and the scenario gave him all the worst of it." --- Wid's Film Daily

"There is a wholesomeness about the way in which the production has been staged, and there is never a moment when the moral balance is lost sight of...The quaint scenes in which Hook Hoover...appears, will please old and young." ---Moving Picture World

"Just another of those impossible stage stories in which the rich young man backs a theatrical company owing to his infatuation for the star, who is an adventuress, meets the good little chorus girl who goes through all sorts of trials and tribulations and in the end marries the poor girl. Well enough played and produced, but the story is altogether too conventional to hold any interest." ---Variety

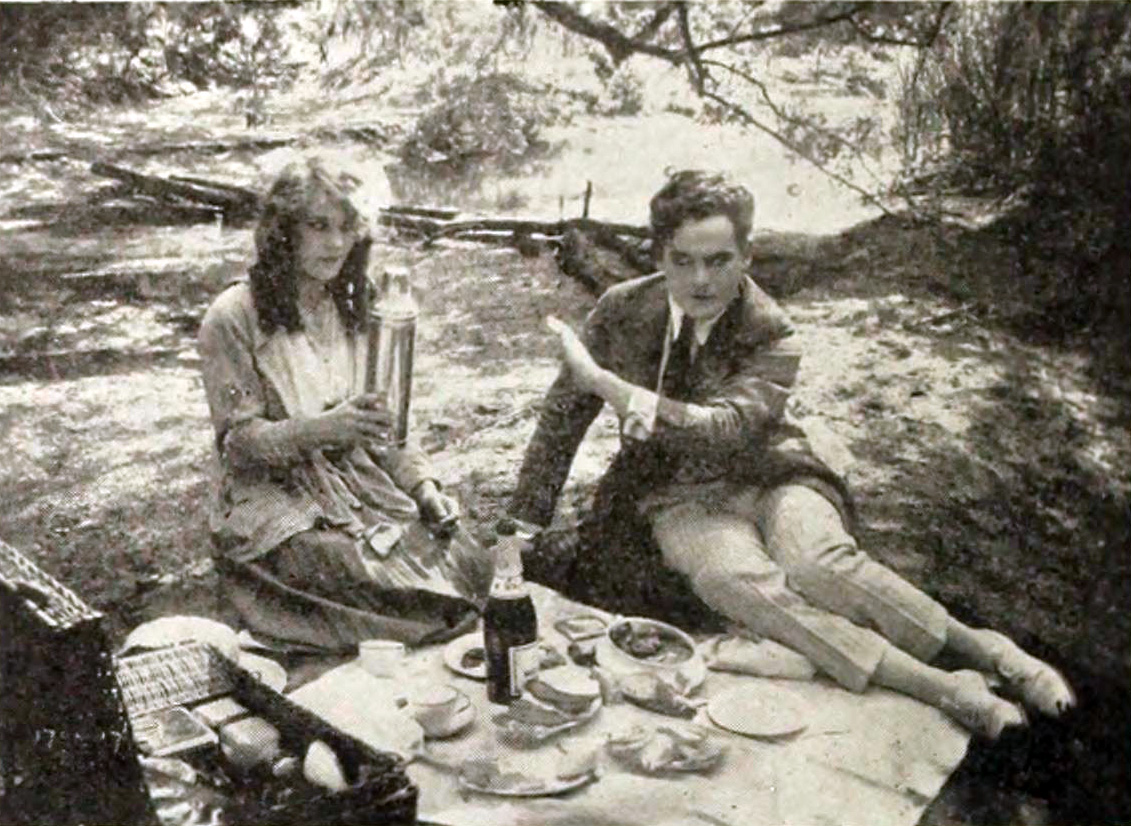
Bobbie of the Ballet (1916)
