= The Shooting of Dan McGrew (1924 film) =

1924 film directed by Clarence G. Badger

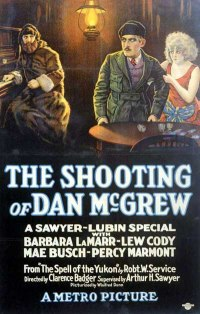
- Theatrical poster
- Directed by: Clarence G. Badger
- Written by: Winifred Dunn; Uncredited: Barbara La Marr
- Story by: Uncredited: Aaron Hoffman; Marvin Dana (1915 version and novelization)
- Based on: "The Shooting of Dan McGrew" by Robert W. Service
- Produced by: Arthur H. Sawyer; Herbert Lubin
- Starring: Barbara La Marr; Lew Cody; Mae Busch
- Cinematography: Rudolph J. Bergquist
- Distributed by: Metro Pictures
- Release date: March 31, 1924
- Running time: 70 minutes
- Country: United States
- Language: Silent (English intertitles)

The Shooting of Dan McGrew is a 1924 American silent drama film directed by Clarence G. Badger. It was final film to be distributed by Metro Pictures, the film is based on the 1907 poem "The Shooting of Dan McGrew" written by Robert W. Service.

== Plot ==
As described in a film magazine review, the theater troupe of which Lou Lorraine is leading dancer is successful in South America, but she urges her husband Jim to leave there for the sake of their two-year-old boy named after his father, Jim. One day, a man nicknamed "Dangerous Dan" McGrew offers to put Lou on the New York City stage. He worsts Jim in a fight and Lou runs away with him. She swears on staying faithful to her husband, promising to earn money so Jim and her son can come to New York. Jim takes his son to New York, encounters McGrew, who escapes from him. Lou and McGrew go to Alaska where she becomes a decoy in the Malamute saloon. Jim learns that Lou was duped by her abductor. He follows them to the Klondike, shoots and kills McGrew, and husband, wife, and child are reunited.

== Cast ==
- Barbara La Marr as The lady known as Lou Lorraine
- Lew Cody as Dangerous Dan McGrew
- Mae Busch as Flo Dupont
- Percy Marmont as Jim, Lou's husband
- Max Asher as Isadore Burke
- Fred Warren as The Ragtime Kid
- George Siegmann as Jake Hubbel
- Nelson McDowell as Sea Captain
- Philippe De Lacy as Little Jim

== Preservation ==
A print of The Shooting of Dan McGrew is located in the collection at Gosfilmofond in Moscow.

== See also ==
- List of films based on poems
