= The Land of Jazz =

1920 film by Jules Furthman

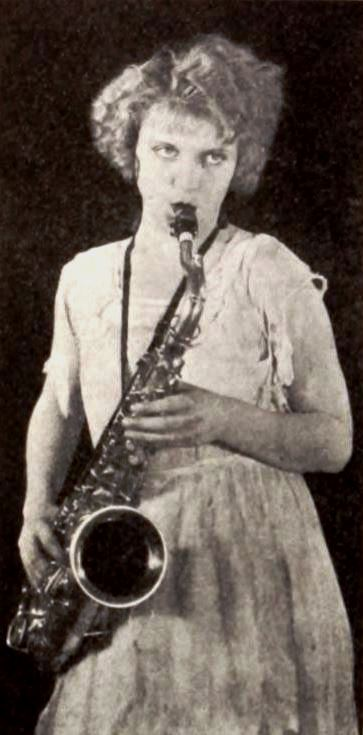
- Still with Eileen Percy
- Directed by: Jules Furthman
- Written by: Scenario: Jules Furthman
- Story by: Barbara La Marr Deely; Jules Furthman
- Produced by: William Fox
- Starring: Eileen Percy
- Cinematography: Walter Williams
- Distributed by: Fox Film Corporation
- Release date: December 1920
- Running time: 50 minutes (5 reels)
- Country: United States
- Language: Silent (English intertitles)

The Land of Jazz is a 1920 American silent comedy film produced and distributed by Fox Film Corporation. Directed and written by Jules Furthman and based on a story by Barbara La Marr and Furthman, it starred Eileen Percy and Ruth Stonehouse.

== Cast ==
- Eileen Percy as Nina Dumbarton
- Ruth Stonehouse as Nancy Lee
- Herbert Heyes as Dr. Vane Carruthers
- George Fisher as Captain De Dortain
- Franklyn Farnum (undetermined role)
- Hayward Mack (undetermined role)
- Rose Dione as Mrs. Lord
- Carrie Clark Ward as Mrs. Dunkinson (credited as Carry Ward)
- Blanche Payson as The Maid
- Clarence Wilson (undetermined role) (credited as Wilson Hummel)
- Harry Dunkinson as Mr. Dumbardon
- Dick La Reno (undetermined role)

== Preservation status ==
The Land of Jazz is now considered to be a lost film.

== See also ==
- 1937 Fox vault fire
