= Rose Dione =

French actress (1875–1936)

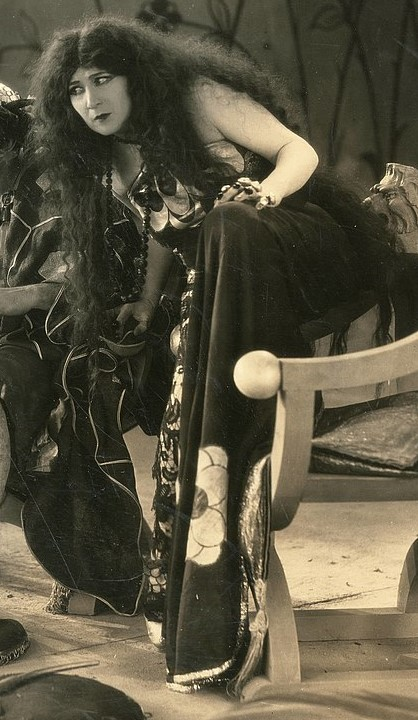
- Dione in Salomé (1923)
- Born: Claudine Rosalie Gras; 22 October 1875; Dardilly (Rhône), France
- Died: 29 January 1936; Los Angeles, California, U.S.
- Other names: Madame or Mademoiselle Rose; Madame Dion; Rosa Dion
- Occupation: Actress
- Years active: 1910–1933

Claudine Rosalie Gras (22 October 1875 – 29 January 1936), professionally known as Rose Dione, was a French-American actress who appeared in numerous silent era and pre-code films.

She appeared in more than 60 films between 1910 and 1932. She was born in Dardilly, Rhône in France, and died in Los Angeles, California. She was probably best known for her final role as Madame Tetrallini in the film Freaks (1932).

== Partial filmography ==
- The Corsican Brothers (1917)
- The World and Its Woman (1919)
- It Happened in Paris (1919)
- Suds (1920)
- The Woman and the Puppet (1920)
- Silk Hosiery (1920)
- The Land of Jazz (1920)
- The Great Lover (1920)
- The Luck of the Irish (1920)
- The Blushing Bride (1921)
- The Four Horsemen of the Apocalypse (1921)
- Cheated Love (1921)
- Silent Years (1921)
- Little Lord Fauntleroy (1921)
- Be My Wife (1921)
- A Parisian Scandal (1921)
- Under Two Flags (1922)
- Omar the Tentmaker (1922)
- Drifting (1923)
- Trilby (1923)
- Salomé (1923)
- The French Doll (1923)
- Shadows of Paris (1924)
- Try and Get It (1924)
- Beau Brummel (1924)
- The Iron Man (1924)
- The Rose of Paris (1924)
- The Lover of Camille (1924)
- Inez from Hollywood (1924)
- One Year to Live (1925)
- Fifth Avenue Models (1925)
- The Girl from Montmartre (1926)
- Madamoiselle Modiste (1926)
- Paris (1926)
- The Duchess of Buffalo (1926)
- Fools of Fashion (1926)
- Polly of the Movies (1927)
- When a Man Loves (1927)
- The Beloved Rogue (1927)
- Ragtime (1927)
- Mad Hour (1928)
- Bringing Up Father (1928)
- Out of the Ruins (1928)
- West of Zanzibar (1928 - unbilled)
- Hearts in Exile (1929)
- Women Everywhere (1930)
- On Your Back (1930)
- Her Wedding Night (1930)
- Salvation Nell (1931)
- The King Murder (1932)
- Freaks (1932)
