= Shore Acres (1920 film) =

1920 film by Rex Ingram

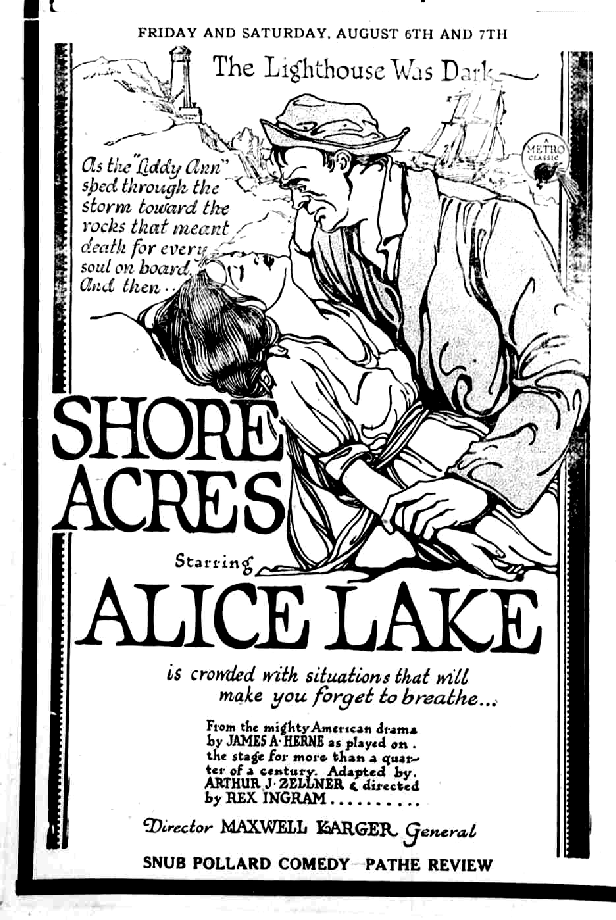
- Directed by: Rex Ingram, Maxwell Karger
- Written by: Arthur J. Zellner (scenario)
- Based on: Shore Acres by James A. Herne
- Starring: Alice Lake
- Cinematography: John F. Seitz
- Edited by: Grant Whytock
- Production company: Screen Classics Inc.
- Distributed by: Metro Pictures Corporation
- Release date: May 16, 1920
- Running time: 60 minutes
- Country: United States
- Language: Silent (English intertitles)

Shore Acres is a 1920 American drama film directed by Rex Ingram that was based on the stage play of the same name by James A. Herne. It was adapted from the play by Arthur J. Zellner.

The silent film was released on May 16, 1920, and runs for 60 minutes, over 6 reels. It is unknown if any copies of the film survive. Thus the film may be lost.

== Plot ==
A period newspaper gives the following description: "Shore Acres is a story of plain New England folk on the rock ribbed coast of Maine. Martin Berry, a stern old lighthouse keeper, forbids his spirited daughter Helen to speak to the man she loves! It is Martin's fondest hope that Helen will marry Josiah Blake, the village banker. Helen refuses to obey her father, and elopes with her sweetheart on the "Liddy Ann," a vessel bound down the coast. Her father learns of her departure, and insane with rage, he prevents his brother, Nathaniel, from lighting the beacon that will guide the vessel safely out through the rocks of the harbor. Desperately the two men battle together in the lighthouse—one to save the vessel, the other to destroy her. A sou'easter is raging, and during their struggle the "Liddy Ann" goes on the rocks and the passengers are left to the mercy of the storm. The scene fairly makes the nerves tingle with excitement. What befalls thereafter is thrillingly unfolded in this picturization of the greatest American play of the century. Shore Acres is a big human drama of thrills and heart throbs, replete with delicious humor and tender pathos."

== Cast ==
- Alice Lake as Helen Berry
- Robert D. Walker as Sam Warren
- Edward Connelly as Uncle Nat Berry
- Frank Brownlee as Martin Berry
- Joseph Kilgour as Josiah Blake
- Margaret McWade as Ann Berry, Martin's Wife
- Nancy Caswell as Milly Berry
- Franklyn Garland as Captain Ben
- Burwell Hamrick as Young Nat Berry
- Richard Headrick as Richard Berry
- Carol Jackson as Carol Berry
- John P. Morse as Tom
- Mary Beaton (undetermined role)

== Production ==
Director Rex Ingram and Alice Terry first met during the making of the film in 1920. They would eventually marry over a weekend during filming of The Prisoner of Zenda in 1922.

Shore Acres was filmed near Laguna, California.
