= My Husband's Wives =

1924 film

- Directed by: Maurice Elvey
- Written by: Barbara La Marr; Dorothy Yost
- Story by: Barbara La Marr
- Starring: Shirley Mason; Bryant Washburn; Evelyn Brent
- Cinematography: Joseph A. Valentine
- Distributed by: Fox Film Corporation
- Release date: November 16, 1924
- Running time: 50 minutes
- Country: United States
- Language: Silent (English intertitles)

My Husband's Wives is a 1924 American silent drama film directed by Maurice Elvey, adapted by Dorothy Yost from a scenario by Barbara La Marr, and starring Shirley Mason, Bryant Washburn, and Evelyn Brent. With no prints of My Husband's Wives located in any known film archives, it is a lost film.

== Plot ==
As described in a review in a film magazine, Vale Harvey did not care about knowing her husband William's past, so she did not know he had been married before and that Marie Wynn, an old school chum of hers, had been his wife. She invited Marie to visit her, and the ex-wife immediately began trying to regain William Harvey's affections. The truth finally dawns on Vale and William evicts Marie, who advises Vale to hereafter listen to her future husbands when they start to disclose their pasts.

== Cast ==
- Shirley Mason as Vale Harvey
- Bryant Washburn as William Harvey
- Evelyn Brent as Marie Wynn
- Paulette Duval as Madame Corregio

== Production ==
The film was shot at the Hotel del Coronado in San Diego.

== See also ==
- 1937 Fox vault fire
