= The World and Its Woman =

1919 film by Frank Lloyd

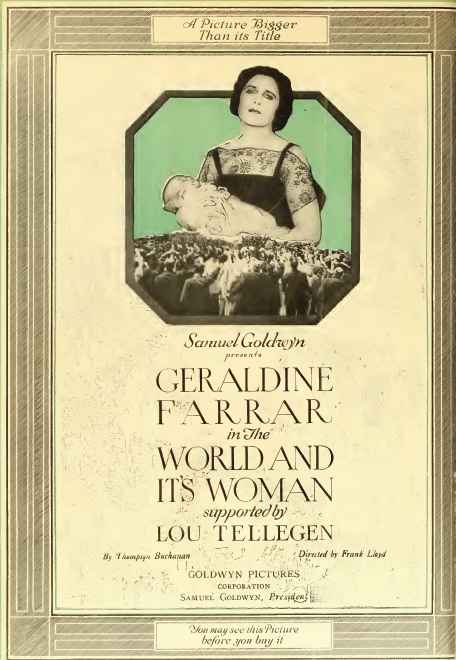
- Lobby poster
- Directed by: Frank Lloyd
- Written by: Thompson Buchanan (story); Edward T. Lowe, Jr. (scenario)
- Produced by: Samuel Goldwyn
- Starring: Geraldine Farrar; Lou Tellegen
- Cinematography: Percy Hilburn (French)
- Distributed by: Goldwyn Pictures
- Release date: September 7, 1919
- Running time: 70 minutes;
- Country: United States
- Language: Silent (English intertitles)

The World and Its Woman is a 1919 American silent drama film produced and distributed by Goldwyn Pictures and directed by Frank Lloyd. Opera singer Geraldine Farrar and her husband Lou Tellegen star.

== Plot ==
As described in an adaptation of the film in the October 1919 issue of the film magazine Shadowland, singer Marcia Warren is in Russia with her father Robert Warren (Edward Connelly), who manages an oil field for Prince Michael Orbeliana the Elder (Alec B. Francis). The Elder Prince requests Marcia to sing for him, which she does well.

The young Prince Michael Orbeliana (Lou Tellegen) and Marcia fall in love, but she rejects his advances because the prince is already married and also could never marry an American. Years later, she is at the opera in Petrograd. The Prince's wife runs off with a count, and, with the Russian Revolution and fall of the Tsar, Michael (who is democratic at heart) leaves the city for the family estates in the Caucuses to deal with the peasants.

The Red leader Peter Poroschine comes to Marcia and professes his love for her, but she rejects him, and he threatens to kill Michael, who is back in the city. Peter has a woman named Feda guard Marcia, but after a struggle Marcia escapes. Marcia goes to Michael and brings him back to her apartment, but Peter also comes there. Peter is killed by Feda. No longer a prince, Michael and Marcia are now free to be together.

== Cast ==
- Geraldine Farrar as Marcia Warren
- Lou Tellegen as Prince Michael Orbeliana
- Mae Giraci as Young Marcia Warren
- Francis Marion as Young Prince Michael Orbeliana
- Alec B. Francis as Prince Michael Orbeliana the Elder
- Edward Connelly as Robert Warren
- Naomi Childers as Baroness Olga Amilahvari
- Lawson Butt as Peter Poroschine
- Arthur Edmund Carewe as Count Alix Voronassof
- Rose Dione as Erina Rodina
- Lydia Yeamans Titus as Mamie Connors

== Preservation status ==
A copy of the film is held and preserved at Belgian archive, Cinematheque Royale de Belgique.
