= John George (actor) =

Syrian-American actor (1898–1968)

- جون جورج
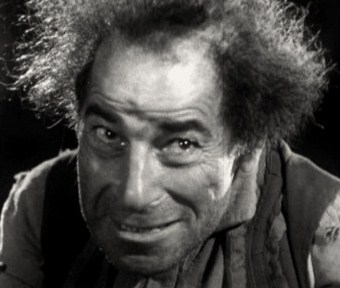
- George in Mesa of Lost Women (1953)
- Born: Tufei Fatella; January 20, 1898; Aleppo, Ottoman Syria
- Died: August 25, 1968 (aged 70); Los Angeles, California, U.S.
- Occupation: Actor
- Years active: 1916–1961

John George (Arabic: جون جورج; born Tufei Fatella, January 20, 1898 – August 25, 1968) was a Syrian-American actor who appeared in at least 130 movies from 1916 to 1960. George worked in films of all genres alongside countless stars although often for only the briefest of appearances, uncredited.

== Early years ==
George was born in Aleppo, Syria. Little is known about his early life but he immigrated to the United States around 1911 and searched for his mother and sisters who seem to have settled in the Nashville, Tennessee, area.

== Film ==
Eventually George found his way to Los Angeles and the early silent film industry. George may have begun his career in the Joseph De Grasse movie Bobbie of the Ballet (1916) as an uncredited "tenement dweller". George may have even appeared earlier than that in the 1915 serial The Broken Coin unbilled, as an actor who strongly favors him appears in a still photo from the chapter play with Francis Ford and Grace Cunard in Daniel Blum's Pictorial History of the Silent Screen.

George went on to appear in Rex Ingram's Gothic melodrama Black Orchids (1917) as a character named Ali Bara. George worked in dozens of movies for Rex Ingram until 1926 when Ingram, tired of George's gambling, sent him home on a bus.

George became a regular in several 1920s silent films with Lon Chaney both at Universal Studios and Metro-Goldwyn-Mayer, including The Road to Mandalay, The Big City, The Hunchback of Notre Dame, Outside The Law and The Unknown. He also appeared in the Warner Brothers production Don Juan (1926) opposite John Barrymore, where he was the cruel dwarf Castle Keeper/Informer who delighted in exposing to Don Jose (Don Juan's father) the infidelities of his wife with another man. He also played Barnaby's minion in the 1934 Babes in Toyland. George continued to appear in movie after movie until some time near his death. One of his last roles was in 1956, an uncredited one as “A Barfly” in James Arness's TV Western Series Gunsmoke, S1E21's “Helping Hand”.

== Death ==
On August 25, 1968, George died from emphysema at age 70 in Los Angeles.

== Partial filmography ==
- The Broken Coin (1915) as unknown role
- Bobbie of the Ballet (1916) as Tenement Dweller(*uncredited)
- Shoes (1916) as Customer(*uncredited)
- The Chalice of Sorrow (1916) as Mexican(*uncredited)
- Black Orchids (1917) as Ali Bara
- Pay Me! (1917) as Bar Patron
- Bound in Morocco (1918) as Hunchback (*uncredited)
- Friends and Frauds (1918) as Prisoner (*uncredited: *short)
- Outside the Law (1920) as Humpy (*uncredited)
- Turn to the Right (1922) as Pool Hall Patron (*uncredited)
- The Prisoner of Zenda (1922) as Dwarf Assassin
- Trifling Women (1922) as Achmet
- Where the Pavement Ends (1923) as Napuka Joe, a Servant
- Scaramouche (1923) as Polichinelle
- When a Girl Loves (1924) as Grishka
- Mare Nostrum (1926) as Servant (*uncredited)
- The Volga Boatman (1926) as Red Army Soldier (*uncredited)
- The Road to Mandalay (1926) as Servant
- The Bells (1926) as Mesmerist Announcer (*uncredited)
- Don Juan (1926) as Hunchback, Castle Keeper (*uncredited)
- The Night of Love (1927) as Jester
- The Show (1927) as Photographer (*uncredited)
- The Unknown (1927) as Cojo
- The Road to Romance (1927) as Small Man (*uncredited)
- The Big City (1928) The Arab
- Condemned (1929) as Convict (*uncredited)
- Outside the Law (1930) as Humpy
- Sherlock Holmes (1932) as Bird Shop Thug(*uncredited)
- Babes in Toyland (1934) as Barnaby's Minion (*uncredited)
- More About Nostradamus (1941) as A Townsman (*uncredited)
- Adventure in Iraq (1943) as Villager (*uncredited)
- The Devil's Playground (1946) as Shorty
- Kiss the Blood Off My Hands (1948) as Midget (*uncredited)
- Mesa of Lost Women (1953) as Aranya's Manservant (*uncredited)
- Oceans 11 (1960) as Vendor(*uncredited)

== See also ==
- Fu Manchu
- Golden Age of Hollywood
- Republic Pictures
- Where the Pavement Ends (1923)
