= Where the Pavement Ends =

1923 film by Rex Ingram

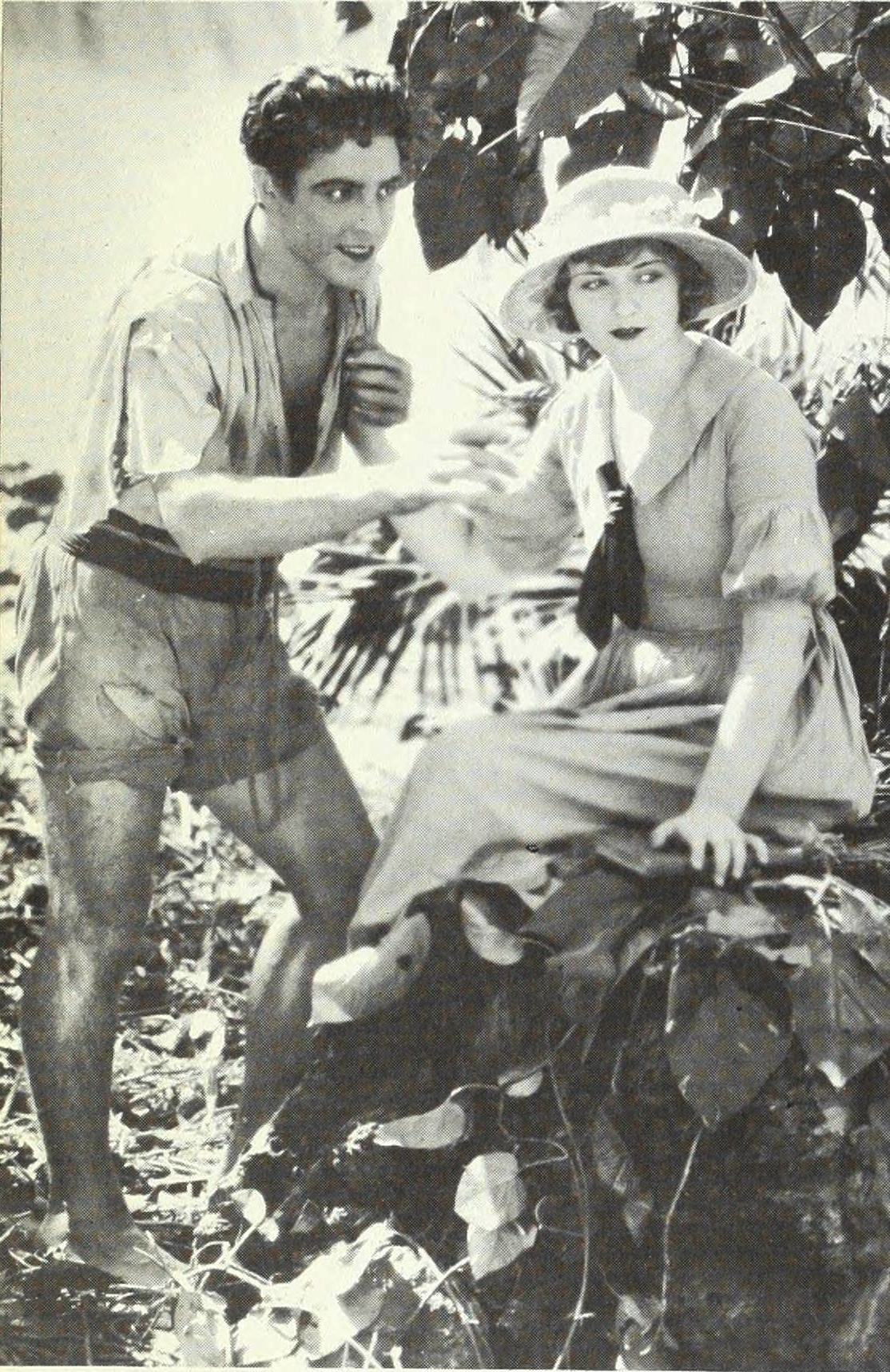
- Directed by: Rex Ingram
- Written by: Rex Ingram (adaptation & scenario)
- Based on: The Passion Vine 1919 story by John Russell; Where the Pavement Ends 1921 story by John Russell
- Produced by: Morton Spring
- Starring: Alice Terry; Ramon Novarro
- Cinematography: John F. Seitz
- Edited by: Grant Whytock
- Production company: Metro Pictures
- Distributed by: Metro Pictures
- Release date: March 19, 1923
- Running time: 70 minutes at 8 reels (7,706 ft.)
- Country: United States
- Language: Silent (English intertitles)

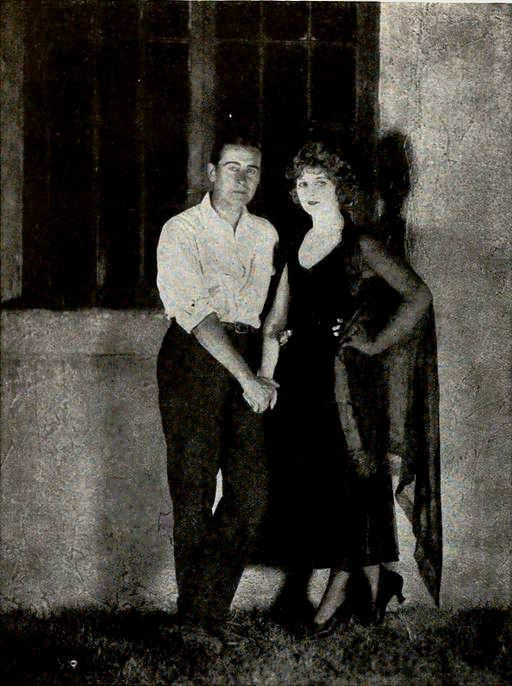
Rex Ingram and Alice Terry before leaving for the filming of Where the Pavement Ends in Cuba

Where the Pavement Ends is a 1923 American silent South Seas romantic drama film directed by Rex Ingram on location in Cuba and starring his wife Alice Terry and Ramon Novarro as lovers. The film was produced and distributed by Metro Pictures. Shooting began in September 1922, at Hialeah Studios in Miami, Florida, yet another source says the film was shot in Coconut Grove, Florida. According to a review in Life, the film was released with a "tragic" ending in New York City and a "happy" ending in other markets.

== Plot ==
The film focuses on Matilda Spener, the daughter of Pastor Spener a missionary, who lives on the island of Wailoa with her father. In pursuit of her affection is the unscrupulous trader and rum shop owner Gregson, whose Matilda views with distaste. Instead, she embarks on a romance with Motauri, the young chieftain of the nearby island of Huapu. Their romantic encounters under the porchlight the mission house are witnessed by Gregson through a telescope; devising a plan to secure Matilda for his own, he tells Pastor Spener that he will renounce his rum shop and become a member of the church. While Pastor Spener is happy to accept this change - positioning Gregson as a potential suitor for his daughter, Matilda is shocked and distressed by the idea. Later, Motauri convinces her to elope with him to Huapu - which she does, embarking on a perilous journey in order to reach their shared dream of a life together.

Upon seeing one of the residences where Motauri's people live, however, Matilda is equally horrified - and soon realises that despite their love for each other, she cannot live in the same conditions. Lost during a hurricane, she finds shelter in another house, and witnesses Gregson - who has pursued them - confronting Motauri. After the argument becomes physical, Motauri kills Gregson, and turns triumphantly to Matilda - only for her to refuse him, claiming that their relationship was a bad idea to begin with. She faints - and Motauri takes her back to the porch of her house, leaving her with a small purse of pearls. As she awakens, she beseeches her father to take her back to England, which Pastor Spener agrees to. Aboard the next vessel, Matilda thinks about Motauri, unaware that he has chosen to face death by toppling over the waterfalls, than to survive a broken heart.

== Cast ==
- Alice Terry as Matilda Spener
- Ramon Novarro as Motauri
- Edward Connelly as Pastor Spener
- Harry T. Morey as Captain Hull Gregson
- John George as Napuka Joe, servant to Gregson

== Preservation ==
With no prints of Where the Pavement Ends located in any film archives, it is considered a lost film. In February 2021, the film was cited by the National Film Preservation Board on their Lost U.S. Silent Feature Films list.

== See also ==
- List of lost films
- South Seas genre
