= Kisses (1922 film) =

1922 film by Maxwell Karger

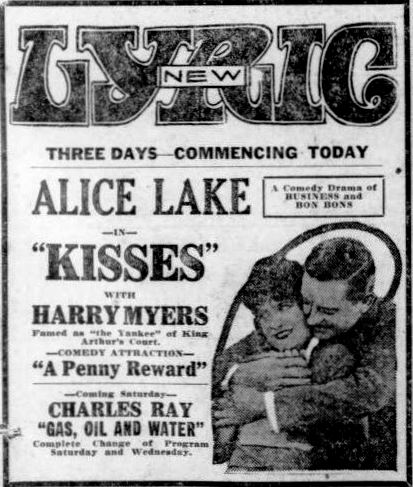
- Directed by: Maxwell Karger
- Written by: June Mathis; May Tully
- Starring: Alice Lake; Harry Myers; Edward Connelly
- Cinematography: Allen G. Siegler
- Production company: Metro Pictures
- Distributed by: Metro Pictures
- Release date: April 3, 1922
- Country: United States
- Languages: Silent; English intertitles

Kisses is a 1922 American silent comedy film directed by Maxwell Karger and starring Alice Lake, Harry Myers and Edward Connelly.

== Cast ==
- Alice Lake as Betty Ellen Estabrook
- Harry Myers as Bill Bailey
- Edward Connelly as Thomas Estabrook
- Edward Jobson as John Maynard
- Dana Todd as Norman Maynard
- Mignon Anderson as Bessie Neldon
- John McKinnon as Edward Nelson
- Eugene Pouyet as Gustave

== Bibliography ==
- Munden, Kenneth White. The American Film Institute Catalog of Motion Pictures Produced in the United States, Part 1. University of California Press, 1997.
