= Quincy Adams Sawyer =

1922 film by Clarence G. Badger

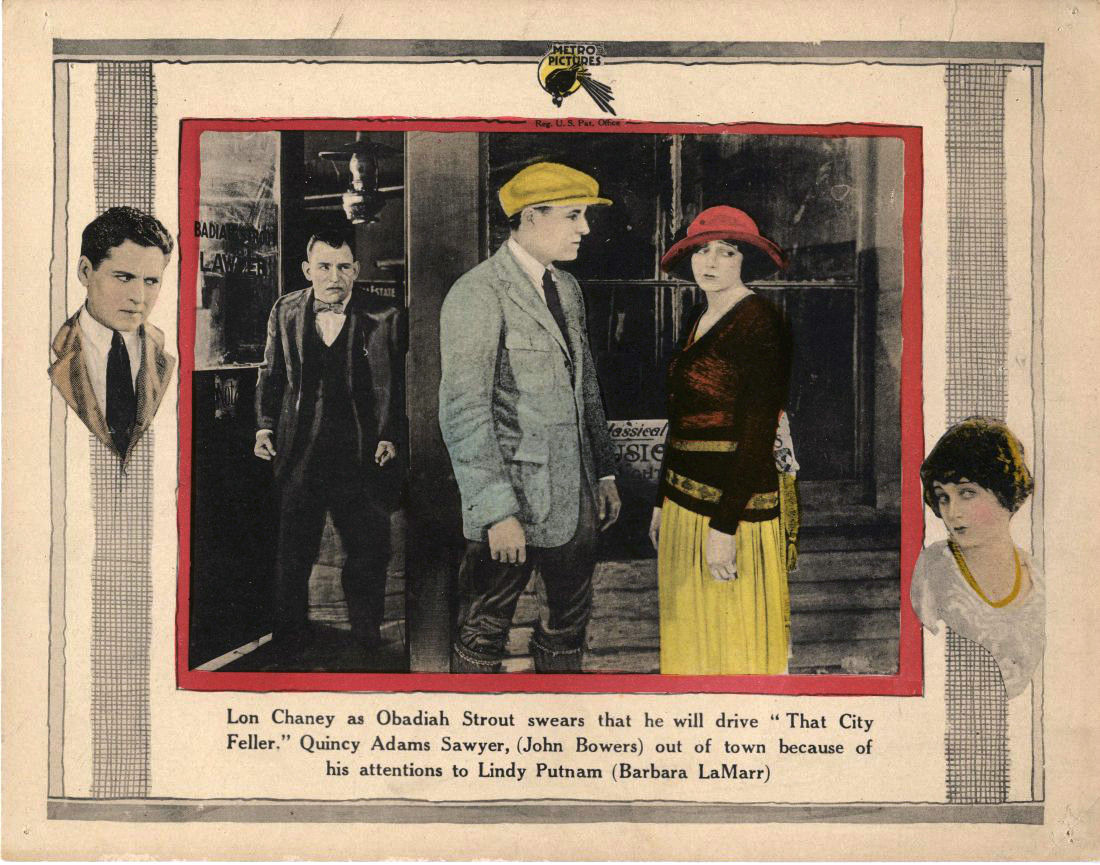
- 1922 lobby card
- Directed by: Clarence G. Badger; Charles Hunt (asst. dir.)
- Written by: Bernard McConville (screenplay); Winifred Dunn (titles)
- Based on: Quincy Adams Sawyer and Mason's Corner Folks by Charles Felton Pidgin
- Produced by: Arthur H. Sawyer; Herbert Lubin
- Starring: John Bowers; Blanche Sweet; Lon Chaney; Barbara La Marr
- Cinematography: Rudolph J. Bergquist
- Production company: Sawyer-Lubin Productions
- Distributed by: Metro Pictures
- Release date: December 4, 1922
- Running time: 80 minutes
- Country: United States
- Language: Silent (English intertitles)

Quincy Adams Sawyer is a 1922 American silent drama film directed by Clarence G. Badger and starring Lon Chaney, John Bowers, Barbara La Marr, and Blanche Sweet. Distributed by Metro Pictures, the film was written by Bernard McConville, based on the 1900 novel Quincy Adams Sawyer and Mason's Corner Folks, written by Charles Felton Pidgin. The novel had been previously adapted to film in 1912. The novel had sold over 1.5 million copies at the time, and had had a successful run as a play (written by Justin Adams). Pidgin went on in later years to write two sequels to his novel due to its immense popularity.

The film was re-released in 1927 by Metro-Goldwyn-Mayer, after Barbara La Marr's death.

== Plot ==
Quincy Adams Sawyer is a handsome young attorney who one day meets a girl in the park. He is immediately smitten with her, but before he can pursue her, he is summoned to the village of Mason's Corner by his father's friend Deacon Pettengill to investigate a villainous lawyer named Obadiah Strout. They think Mrs. Putnam, a rich old woman, is being swindled by Strout. Putnam's daughter, Lindy, a vamp, attempts to seduce Sawyer. He shows interest in her until he finds out who the girl he met in the park was: Pettengill's niece Alice, who has become blind since their last meeting.

Despite this tragedy, Sawyer falls in love with Alice. Meanwhile, Strout wants to scare Sawyer away, and he convinces the bullyish Abner Stiles, who once committed a murder, that Sawyer is in town to investigate him. Strout succeeds in goading the brutish Stiles to assault Quincy, but having some boxing skills, the handsome young lawyer winds up giving the bully a tremendous beating.

Meanwhile, Lindy wants to get rid of her rival, Alice, and with the help of Strout, she lures the blind girl onto a boat, after which the cable is cut. The little boat is sent adrift, and Alice is heading straight for the waterfalls. Quincy races to the river and, at the risk of his own life, rescues her from a fatal fall.

Overcome by all the excitement, Alice suddenly regains her eyesight. The Deacon is unaware that his daughter has been rescued and thinks that Strout has killed her. He grabs a revolver and plans to shoot Strout, but he arrives too late. He finds that Stiles, who finally realized he was being used, has already killed Strout himself in a wild rage.

== Cast ==
- John Bowers as Quincy Adams Sawyer
- Blanche Sweet as Alice Pettengill
- Lon Chaney as Obadiah Strout
- Barbara La Marr as Lindy Putnam
- Elmo Lincoln as Abner Stiles
- Louise Fazenda as Mandy Skinner
- Joseph J. Dowling as Nathaniel Sawyer
- Claire McDowell as Mrs. Putnam
- Edward Connelly as Deacon Pettengill
- Victor Potel - as Hiram Maxwell
- June Elvidge as Betsy Ann Ross
- Gale Henry as Samanthey
- Hank Mann as Ben Bates
- Kate Lester as Mrs. Sawyer
- Billy Franey as Bob Wood
- Taylor Graves as Cobb Twin
- Harry Depp as Cobb Twin
- Andrew Arbuckle

== Production ==
Parts of the film were shot along the Columbia River in Washington State, and in Del Monte, California. A still exists showing Chaney in a scene from the film. The film's tagline was "Ten million people hungrily read the novel by Charles Felton Pidgin. And the photo play, of the homespun folks of old New England, is the kind everybody enjoys."

== Reception ==
Film magazine Moving Picture World was uninspired by the film's story, but called it an entertaining film. The New York Times thought the film was 'superficial' and stated that not even Lon Chaney's acting could save it. Variety praised 'the fearful hokum purveyed in the story' and was especially positive about Chaney and Elmo Lincoln. Barbara La Marr received favorable reviews from the critics as well, and the film was a success at the box office.

"It is not a subtle story and everything turns out just as you would wish it, but it is a vastly entertaining picture containing about all the elements that good showmanship has shown audiences desire." ---Moving Picture World.

"An excellent picture of its kind, with the homey atmosphere accentuated. Lon Chaney and Elmo Lincoln do good work as the villains. But it seems that the good work of nearly everyone in the cast, which is as near all-star as one can assemble, is overshadowed by the fearful hokum purveyed in the story." ---Variety

"The picture would be a lot better than it is if it were only a little less superficial and if the subtitle writer had not done all in his power to destroy it...For instance, Lon Chaney is the villain. Now, if there is any one who can be more palpably and pointedly a villain than Mr. Chaney he hasn't appeared in the studios as yet. Surely he needs no introduction. Yet he is introduced in a subtitle which says, in effect, 'Ladies and gentlemen, we now present the villain of our piece, an evil fellow, believe us, who has designs on the heroine because she has just inherited a large sum of money. Look--Lon Chaney, the villain.' And then there's nothing for Mr. Chaney to do, but illustrate the subtitle. His best acting can add no revelation to it. So it falls flat. " ---The New York Times

"There are few pictures that can boast of a cast containing any more well known players assembled than inQuincy Adams Sawyer.... It holds good interest and many unexpected thrills occur as the story progresses".----Exhibitors Trade Review

"Lon Chaney adds another to his long list of splendid characterizations as the village attorney with his special haircut for the party and his elaborate use of facial expression. He practically steals this picture." ---Film Daily

== Preservation ==
With no prints of Quincy Adams Sawyer located in any film archives, it is considered a lost film. In February 2021, the film was cited by the National Film Preservation Board on their Lost U.S. Silent Feature Films list.

== See also ==
- List of lost films
