= The Girl from Montmartre =

1926 film by Alfred E. Green

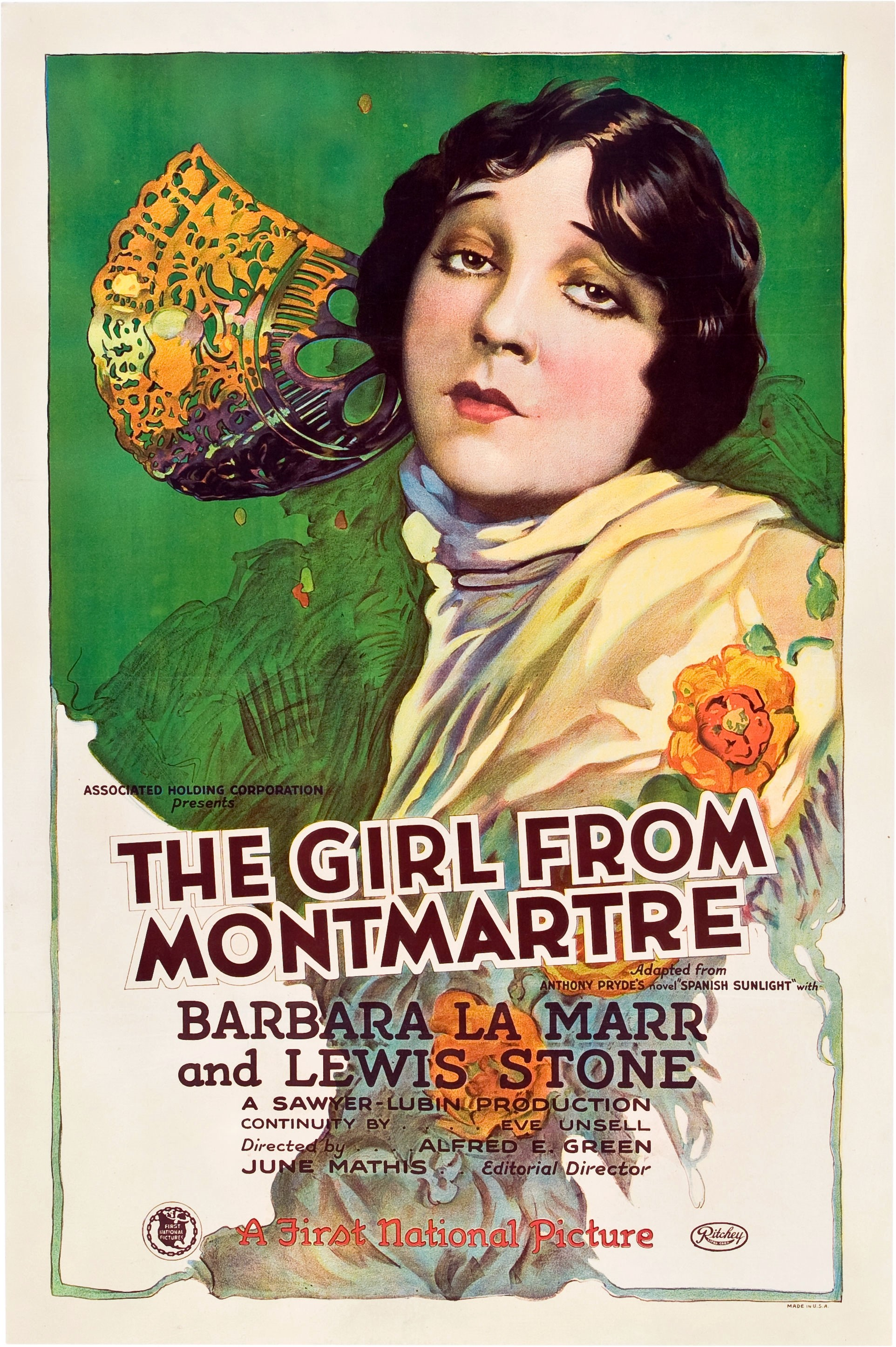
- Film poster
- Directed by: Alfred E. Green
- Written by: Eve Unsell (continuity); June Mathis (edit. director); George Marion Jr. (titles)
- Produced by: Arthur H. Sawyer; Associated Holding Corp.
- Cinematography: Rudolph J. Bergquist
- Edited by: June Mathis
- Production company: Associated Holding Corporation
- Distributed by: First National Pictures
- Release date: January 31, 1926
- Running time: 60 minutes
- Country: United States
- Language: Silent (English intertitles)

The Girl from Montmartre is a 1926 American silent romantic drama film directed by Alfred E. Green and starring Barbara La Marr in her last film role. It was distributed through First National on the day after La Marr died.

== Plot ==
As described in a film magazine review, Emilia Faneaux, the daughter of a derelict Englishman of good family and a Spanish woman, becomes a dance hall performer following the death of her father, while her brother becomes an unscrupulous adventurer. The young woman meets a wealthy Englishman who immediately loves her and whose love she returns. The advent of the Englishman causes the woman’s brother to reform somewhat, and on one occasion he saves the Englishman from death. An actor who wishes to marry the Emilia abducts her. The Englishman pursues him and, after a struggle, rescues the young woman. They go to England and are married.

== Cast ==
- Barbara La Marr as Emilia Faneaux
- Lewis Stone as Jerome Hautrive
- Robert Ellis as Jack Ewing
- William Eugene as Rodney Brown Faneaux
- E. H. Calvert as Lord Robert Hautrive
- Mario Carillo as Lawrence "Larry" Faneaux
- Mathilde Comont as Carmenata
- Edward Peil Sr. as Messenger (credited as Edward Peil)
- Nick De Ruiz as Don Angel (credited as Nicholas De Ruiz)
- Bobbie Mack as Cab Driver (credited as Bobby Mack)
- John T. Bambury as Midget (uncredited)
- André Cheron as Customer at The Red Mouse (uncredited)
- Rose Dione as Patron (uncredited)
- Lolita Lee as Emilia Faneaux, as standin to completed film while Lamarr was ill (uncredited)
- Robert Milasch as Military Policeman (uncredited)
- Julian Rivero as Admirer at Don Angel's (uncredited)
- Hector Sarno as Gambler (uncredited)
- Philip Sleeman as Gambler (uncredited)
- Arthur Stone as Dancing Doughboy (uncredited)
- Leo White as French Officer (uncredited)

== Production ==
In late 1925 during filming of The Girl from Montmartre, as a result of her health issues La Marr collapsed on the film set and later went into a coma. The studio completed the film without her, and it was released the next year on January 31, 1926, which was one day after she died. Two weeks later, First National decided to remove her name from the title card of the film and its advertising, so that the film was promoted as "First National presents The Girl from Montmartre with Lewis Stone."

== Preservation ==
Lost Film Files has mistakenly listed The Girl from Montmartre as a lost film. The online Library of Congress / FIAF database lists a print of the film located in the George Eastman Museum Motion Picture Collection and an excerpt consisting of one reel at UCLA Film & Television Archive.

== See also ==
- List of early color feature films
