= The Prisoner of Zenda (1922 film) =

1922 film directed by Rex Ingram

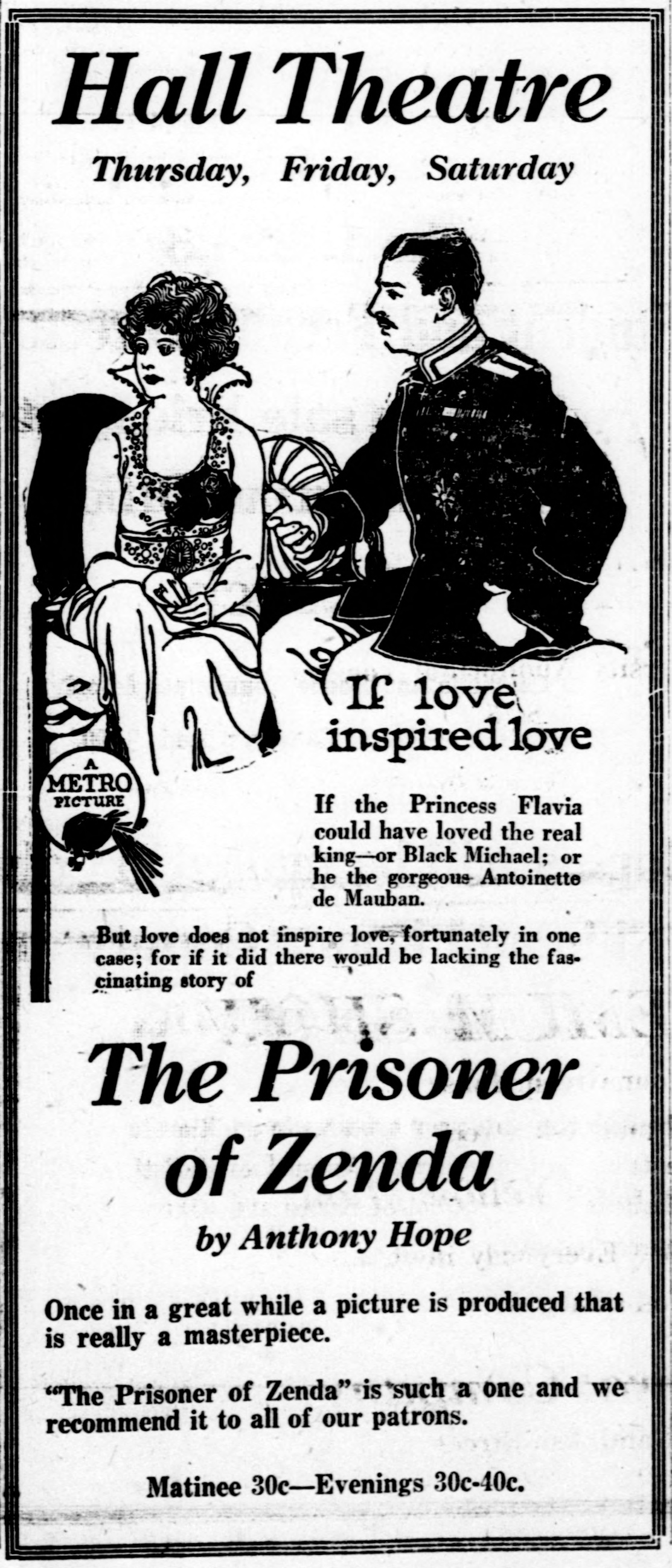
- A newspaper advertisement.
- Directed by: Rex Ingram
- Written by: Mary O'Hara
- Based on: The Prisoner of Zenda 1894 novel by Edward E. Rice Anthony Hope; The Prisoner of Zenda 1896 play by Edward E. Rose
- Produced by: Rex Ingram
- Starring: Lewis Stone; Alice Terry; Robert Edeson; Stuart Holmes; Ramón Novarro; Barbara La Marr
- Cinematography: John Seitz
- Edited by: Grant Whytock
- Music by: William Axt
- Production company: Metro Pictures
- Distributed by: Metro Pictures
- Release date: July 31, 1922
- Running time: 113-125 minutes
- Country: United States
- Language: Silent (English intertitles)
- Budget: $1,118,453.16

The Prisoner of Zenda is a 1922 American silent adventure film directed by Rex Ingram, one of the many adaptations of Anthony Hope's popular 1894 novel The Prisoner of Zenda and the subsequent 1896 play by Hope and Edward Rose.

Full film

== Plot ==
Englishman Rudolf Rassendyll (Lewis Stone) decides to pass the time by attending the coronation of his distant relation, King Rudolf V of Ruritania (also played by Stone) . He encounters an acquaintance on the train there, Antoinette de Mauban (Barbara La Marr), the mistress of the king's treacherous brother, Grand Duke 'Black' Michael (Stuart Holmes).

The day before the coronation, Rassendyll is seen by Colonel Sapt (Robert Edeson) and Captain Fritz von Tarlenheim (Malcolm McGregor). Astounded by the uncanny resemblance between Rassendyll and their liege, they take him to meet Rudolf at a hunting lodge. The king is delighted with his double and invites him to dinner. During the meal, a servant brings in a fine bottle of wine, a present from Michael delivered by his henchman, Rupert of Hentzau (Ramon Novarro). After Rudolf tastes it, he finds it so irresistible that he drinks the entire bottle by himself.

The next morning, Sapt is unable to rouse him; the wine was drugged. Sapt is afraid that if the coronation is postponed, Michael will seize the throne. The country is dangerously divided between the supporters of Rudolf and of Michael. The colonel declares that it is Fate that brought Rassendyll to Ruritania; he can take Rudolf's place with no one the wiser. The Englishman is less certain, but he tosses a coin, which lands in Rudolf's favor, and Rassendyll goes through with the ceremony. Afterwards, he is driven to the palace in the company of the universally adored Princess Flavia (Alice Terry).

Later, when Rassendyll returns to the lodge to switch places with the king once more, he and Sapt find only the corpse of Josef (Snitz Edwards), the servant left to guard the king. Rassendyll is forced to continue the masquerade.

With Rudolf guarded by a handful of trusted retainers at Zenda Castle, Michael tries unsuccessfully to bribe Rassendyll into leaving. In the days that follow, Rasssendyll becomes acquainted with Flavia, and the two fall in love. Meanwhile, Rupert tries to alienate Antoinette from Michael by telling her that Michael will marry Flavia once Rudolf is out of the way. However, it has an unintended effect; Antionette reveals Michael's plans and Rudolf's location to von Tarlenheim.

A dwarf assassin (John George) in Michael's pay tries to garrot Rassendyll, but Sapt interrupts him before he can finish the job. The would-be killer mistakenly signals to an anxiously waiting Michael that the deed is done, and the duke hastens to Zenda to quietly dispose of the real king. However, Rassendyll was only rendered unconscious. When von Tarlenheim arrives with his news, the three men chase after Michael.

Sapt and von Tarlenheim split up to find a way into the castle, but when Antoinette lowers the drawbridge, Rassendyll goes inside alone. Though outnumbered, he manages to kill Michael in a sword fight. Then Sapt and von Tarlenheim come to his aid. When Rupert is cornered by the three men, he chooses death over a waterfall rather than execution for treason.

In the aftermath, Rudolf resumes his rightful position, while Rassendyll hides out at the lodge. By chance, Flavia stops there to speak with Colonel Sapt. Despite Sapt's attempt to shield the princess from heartbreak, a servant girl blurts out that the "king" is staying at the lodge. Rassendyll is forced to tell his beloved the bitter truth. When he tries to persuade her to leave with him, her sense of honour and duty to her country compel her to stay, and Rassendyll departs alone.

== Cast ==
- Lewis Stone as Rudolf Rassendyll/King Rudolf V
- Alice Terry as Princess Flavia
- Robert Edeson as Colonel Sapt
- Stuart Holmes as Grand Duke Michael
- Ramon Novarro as Rupert of Hentzau
- Barbara La Marr as Antoinette de Mauban
- Malcolm McGregor as Captain Fritz von Tarlenheim
- Edward Connelly as Marshal von Strakencz
- Lois Lee as Countess Helga, Flavia's lady-in-waiting
- Snitz Edwards as Josef
- John George as Dwarf assassin
- Fairfax Burger as Bersonin
- S. E. Jennings as De Gautet
- Ted Billings as Train Passenger (uncredited)

== Production ==
Director Rex Ingram and star Alice Terry had known each other since they worked together on the film Shore Acres in 1920. The pair slipped off together during filming one Saturday and were married. They spent Sunday watching movies together, and were back at work on Monday. It was not revealed that they had married until after the film had been completed and the couple were on their honeymoon.

== Reception ==
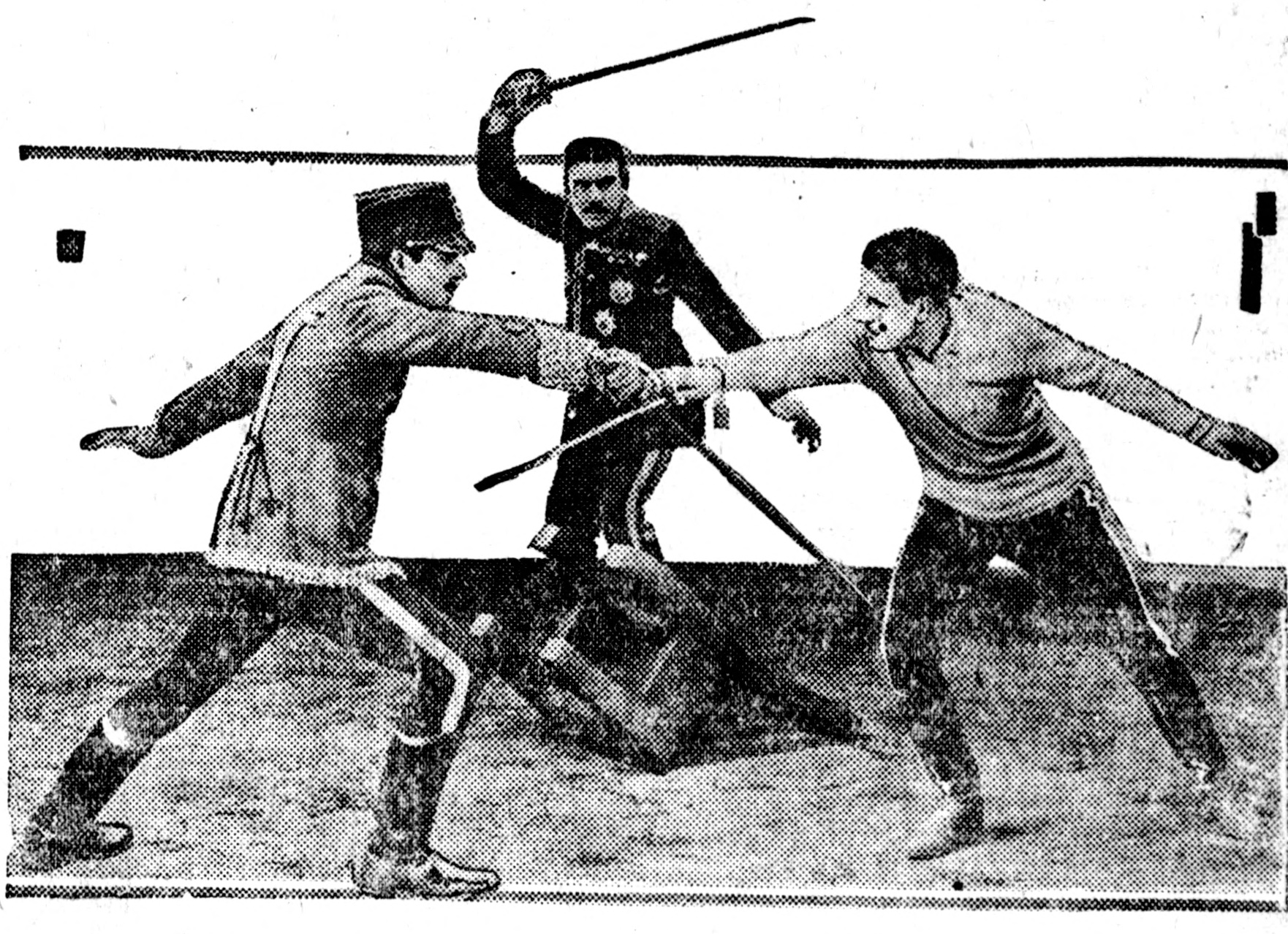
A scene from the film, as depicted in a contemporaneous newspaper.

The film was received positively by critics. The New York Times called it "well worth seeing" though "needlessly talky", and wrote that "much of the acting is excellent", if occasionally "overdone". "It couldn't miss", wrote Variety of the film's content. "It probably would have been proof against bad direction, but done with perfect stage management and exquisite literary taste it is faultless." The New York World called it "dignified elegance from start to finish." "One of the best productions given to the public by Mr. Ingram", reported the New York Telegram. "It has all the thrills and chills of the melodrama, without leaving an unpleasant memory." "Perhaps after mature deliberation I may want to retract the statement, but in this moment of enthusiasm I want to say that I think The Prisoner of Zenda is the best picture I have ever seen", raved the Chicago Tribune critic. Ultimately, it proved one of the most critically acclaimed films of 1922, placing fourth on The Film Daily's inaugural critics poll.
