= Edward Connelly =

American actor (1859–1928)

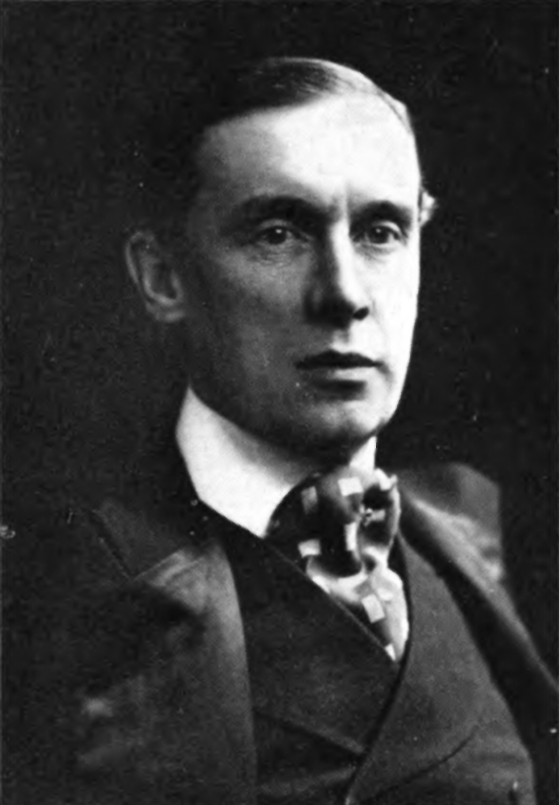
- Connelly, c. 1909
- Born: December 30, 1859; New York, New York, US
- Died: November 21, 1928 (aged 68); Hollywood, California, US
- Occupation: Actor
- Years active: 1914–28

Edward Connelly (December 30, 1859 – November 21, 1928) was an American stage and film actor of the silent era.

== Biography ==
Connelly had a Broadway theater career going back to the Victorian era. His Broadway credits include The Wild Duck (1918), The Great Adventure (1913), A Good Little Devil (1913), The Dollar Princess (1909), Twiddle-Twaddle (1906), Bird Center (1904), Babette (1903), and The Belle of New York (1900).

Connelly appeared in 69 films between 1914 and 1929. His last film was The Desert Law.

He was born in New York, New York and died of influenza in Hollywood, California. He was survived by his wife.

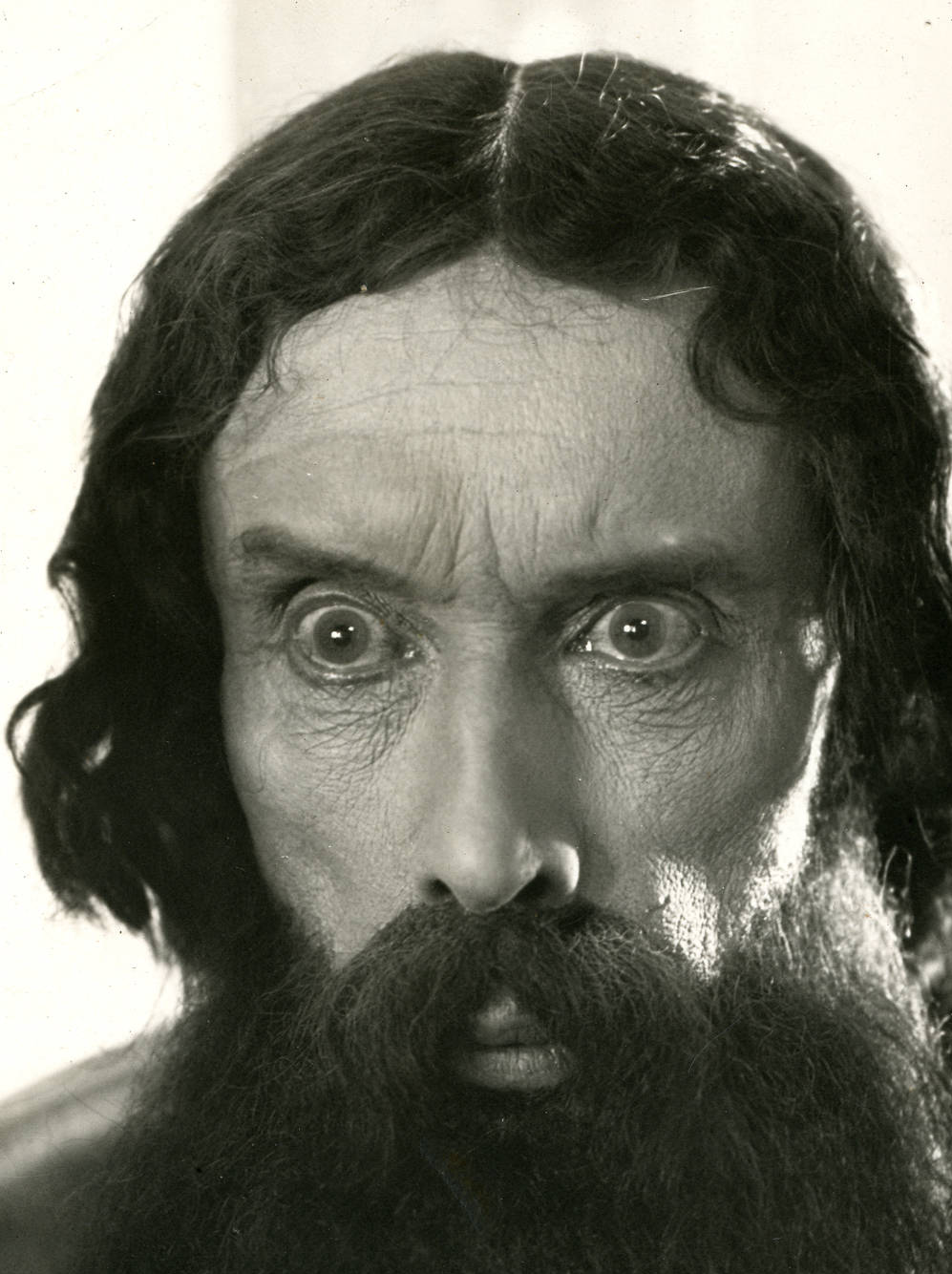
Edward Connelly as Rasputin in The Fall of the Romanoffs (1917 film).

== Selected filmography ==
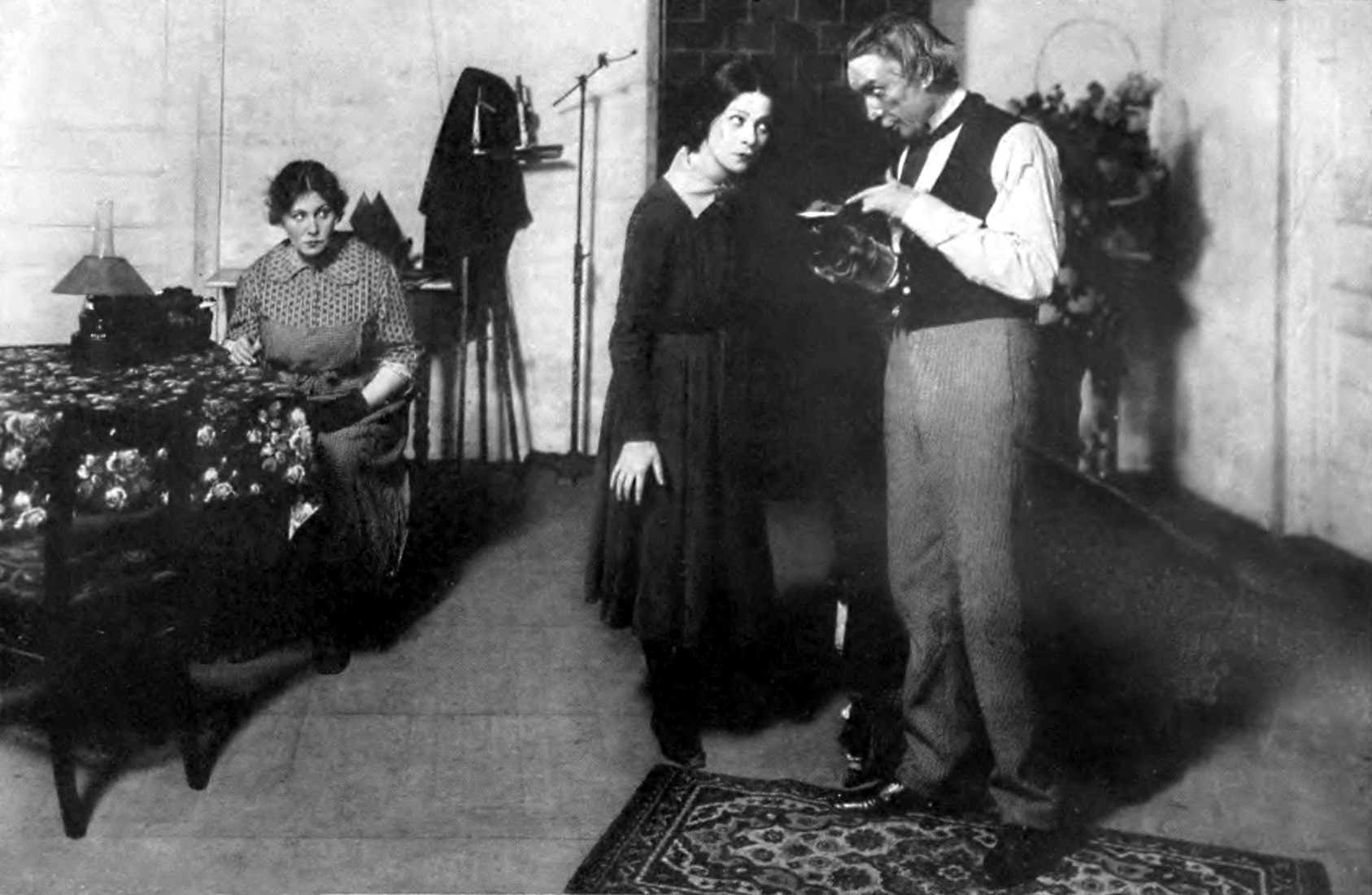
Amy Veness, Alla Nazimova and Connelly in the original Broadway production of Ibsen's The Wild Duck (1918)

- A Good Little Devil (1914)
- Shore Acres (1914)
- The Devil (1915)
- Marse Covington (1915) as Covington Halliday ("Marse Covington")
- The Fall of the Romanoffs (1917)
- A Successful Adventure (1918)
- The First Law (1918)
- The Lion's Den (1919)
- The Red Lantern (1919)
- The Great Victory (1919)
- The World and Its Woman (1919)
- The Parisian Tigress (1919)
- In Old Kentucky (1919)
- Johnny-on-the-Spot (1919)
- False Evidence (1919)
- Easy to Make Money (1919)
- The Willow Tree (1920)
- Shore Acres (1920)
- The Saphead (1920)
- Hearts Are Trumps (1920)
- Cinderella's Twin (1920)
- Dangerous to Men (1920)
- The Four Horsemen of the Apocalypse (1921)
- The Last Card (1921)
- The Conquering Power (1921)
- Conflict (1921)
- Camille (1921)
- Turn To The Right (1922)
- Kisses (1922)
- Love in the Dark (1922)
- Seeing's Believing (1922)
- The Prisoner of Zenda (1922)
- Trifling Women (1922)
- Her Fatal Millions (1923)
- Desire (1923)
- Where the Pavement Ends (1923)
- Slave of Desire (1923)
- The Goldfish (1924)
- A Fool's Awakening (1924)
- The Denial (1925)
- The Unholy Three (1925)
- Sun-Up (1925)
- So This Is Marriage? (1925)
- The Merry Widow (1925)
- The Torrent (1926)
- Brown of Harvard (1926)
- Bardelys the Magnificent (1926)
- Love (1927)
- The Show (1927)
- The Student Prince in Old Heidelberg (1927)
- Across to Singapore (1928)
- Forbidden Hours (1928)
- The Mysterious Lady (1928)
- Brotherly Love (1928)
- The Desert Rider (1929)
