= Thundering Thompson =

1929 film

- Directed by: Ben F. Wilson
- Written by: Robert Dillon (story and scenario)
- Produced by: Morris R. Schlank (executive producer)
- Starring: Neva Gerber
- Cinematography: Robert E. Cline
- Edited by: Earl Turner
- Production company: Morris R. Schlank Productions
- Distributed by: Anchor Film Distributors, Inc.
- Release date: October 8, 1929
- Running time: 5 reels
- Country: United States
- Languages: Silent; English intertitles

Thundering Thompson is a 1929 American silent Western film directed by Ben F. Wilson.

== Cast ==
- Cheyenne Bill as Deputy Sheriff 'Thundering' Thompson
- Neva Gerber as Maria Valerian
- Al Ferguson as Bill Edwards
- Cliff Lyons as Efe
- Ed La Niece as George Morgan
