= The Fighting Stallion (1927 film) =

1927 film

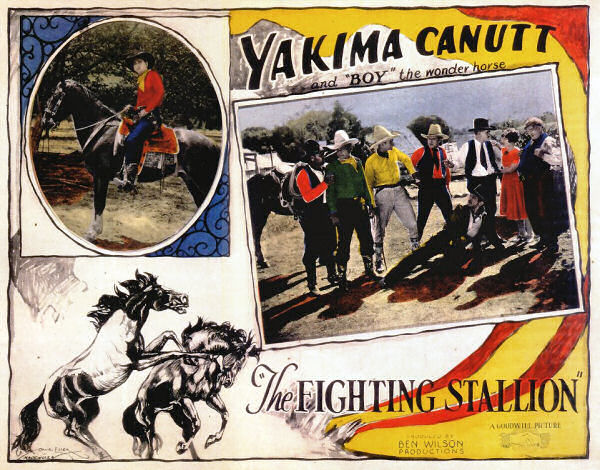
- Directed by: Ben F. Wilson
- Written by: George W. Pyper
- Produced by: Ben F. Wilson
- Starring: Yakima Canutt; Neva Gerber
- Cinematography: Joseph Walker
- Edited by: Earl Turner
- Production company: Ben Wilson Productions
- Distributed by: Goodwill Productions
- Release date: August 8, 1927
- Country: United States
- Languages: Silent; English intertitles

The Fighting Stallion is a 1927 American silent Western film directed by Ben F. Wilson and starring Yakima Canutt and Neva Gerber.

== Cast ==
- Yakima Canutt as Yak
- Neva Gerber as Helen Gilmore
- Al Ferguson as Steve Mays
- Leonard Trainor as Frank Gilmore
- Fred Gamble as Tubby
- Bud Osborne as Chuck Lannigan
