= The Old Code =

1928 film

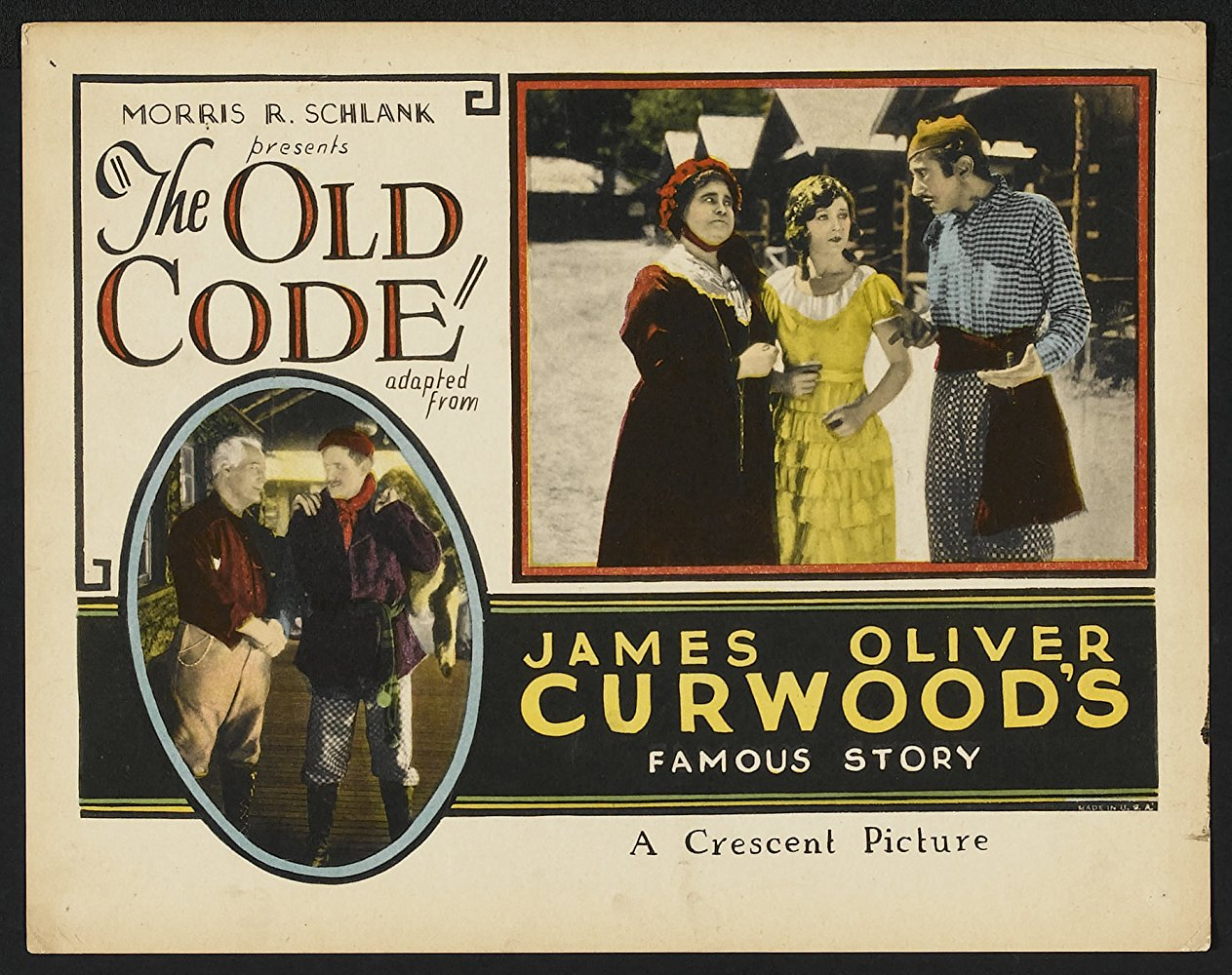
- Directed by: Ben F. Wilson
- Written by: James Oliver Curwood (story); Everett C. Maxwell
- Produced by: Morris R. Schlank
- Starring: Walter McGrail; Lillian Rich; Cliff Lyons
- Cinematography: Frank Cotner; Jack Jackson
- Edited by: Earl Turner
- Production company: Morris R. Schlank Productions
- Distributed by: Anchor Film Distributors
- Release date: November 14, 1928
- Running time: 60 minutes
- Country: United States
- Languages: Silent; English intertitles

The Old Code is a 1928 American silent historical drama film directed by Ben F. Wilson and starring Walter McGrail, Lillian Rich and Cliff Lyons. It is based on a story by James Oliver Curwood, about a Native American girl in love with a French fur trapper. It is not to be confused with the 1915 film of the same name also adapted from James Oliver Curwood's story.

== Cast ==
- Walter McGrail as Pierre Belleu
- Lillian Rich as Marie d'Arcy
- Cliff Lyons as Jacques de Long
- Melbourne MacDowell as Steve MacGregor
- J.P. McGowan as Raoul de Valle
- Neva Gerber as Lola
- Ervin Renard as Henri Langlis
- Mary Gordon as Mary MacGregor
- Rhody Hathaway as Father Le Fane

== Bibliography ==
- Langman, Larry. A Guide to Silent Westerns. Greenwood Publishing Group, 1992.
