= Like Wildfire =

1917 film

- Directed by: Stuart Paton
- Written by: Louis Weitzenkorn (story); Karl R. Coolidge
- Starring: Herbert Rawlinson; Neva Gerber; L.M. Wells
- Production company: Universal Pictures
- Distributed by: Universal Pictures
- Release date: May 21, 1917
- Running time: 50 minutes
- Country: United States
- Languages: Silent; English intertitles

Like Wildfire is a 1917 American silent comedy drama film directed by Stuart Paton and starring Herbert Rawlinson, Neva Gerber and L.M. Wells.

== Cast ==
- Herbert Rawlinson as Tommy Buckman
- Neva Gerber as Nina Potter
- L.M. Wells as John S. Buckman
- John Cook as Phillip Potter
- Howard Crampton as William Tobias
- Burton Law as Brown
- Willard Wayne as Phil

== Bibliography ==
- Robert B. Connelly. The Silents: Silent Feature Films, 1910-36, Volume 40, Issue 2. December Press, 1998.
