= The Santa Fe Trail (1923 film) =

1923 film

- Directed by: Ashton Dearholt; Robert Dillon
- Screenplay by: Robert Dillon
- Story by: Ben F. Wilson
- Starring: Jack Perrin; Neva Gerber
- Distributed by: Arrow Film Corporation
- Release date: July 15, 1923
- Running time: 15 episodes
- Country: United States
- Languages: Silent; English intertitles

The Santa Fe Trail is a 1923 American silent Western film serial directed by Ashton Dearholt and Robert Dillon, produced by Ben F. Wilson and released by Arrow Film Corporation. The film is considered to be lost.

== Cast ==
- Jack Perrin as Kit Carson
- Neva Gerber
- Jim Welch (as James Welch)
- Elias Bullock
- Wilbur McGaugh
- Clark B. Coffey
- Joe De La Cruz
- Maria Laredo
- Ned Jarvis

== See also ==
- List of film serials
- List of film serials by studio
- List of lost films
