= His Last Bullet =

1928 film

- Directed by: Ben F. Wilson
- Written by: Robert A. Dillon
- Produced by: Sherman S. Krellberg
- Starring: Al Hoxie; Peggy O'Day
- Cinematography: Frank Cotner; Jack Jackson
- Edited by: Earl Turner
- Production company: Krelbar Pictures Corporation
- Distributed by: Collwyn Pictures Corporation
- Release date: March 19, 1928
- Running time: 50 minutes
- Country: United States
- Languages: Silent; English intertitles

His Last Bullet is a 1928 American silent Western film directed by Ben F. Wilson and starring Al Hoxie and Peggy O'Day.

== Cast ==
- Al Hoxie as Tom Randall
- Peggy O'Day as Ethel Thompson
- Ben Wilson Jr. as Phil Randall
- Ellis Houston as Joe Corrigan
- Slim Parelda as Miller
- Ed La Niece as Jed Thompson
- Sunflash the Wonder Horse as Sunflash, Tom's Horse
