= The Range Riders =

1927 film

- Directed by: Ben F. Wilson
- Written by: Robert Dillon; Earl Turner
- Produced by: W. Ray Johnston; Ben F. Wilson
- Starring: Ben F. Wilson; Neva Gerber; Al Ferguson
- Cinematography: Edward Linden
- Edited by: Earl Turner
- Production company: Ben Wilson Productions
- Distributed by: Rayart Pictures
- Release date: April 1927
- Running time: 50 minutes
- Country: United States
- Languages: Silent; English intertitles

The Range Riders is a 1927 American silent Western film directed by Ben F. Wilson and starring Wilson, Neva Gerber, Al Ferguson.

== Cast ==
- Ben F. Wilson as Sra. Shannon
- Neva Gerber as Betty Grannan
- Al Ferguson as 'Sundown' Sykes
- Ed La Niece as Henry Fellows
- Earl Turner as Capt. Lae
- Fang the Dog as Pard the Dog

== Bibliography ==
- Connelly, Robert B. The Silents: Silent Feature Films, 1910-36, Volume 40, Issue 2. December Press, 1998.
- Munden, Kenneth White. The American Film Institute Catalog of Motion Pictures Produced in the United States, Part 1. University of California Press, 1997.
