= Tentacles of the North =

1926 film

In the Tentacles of the North
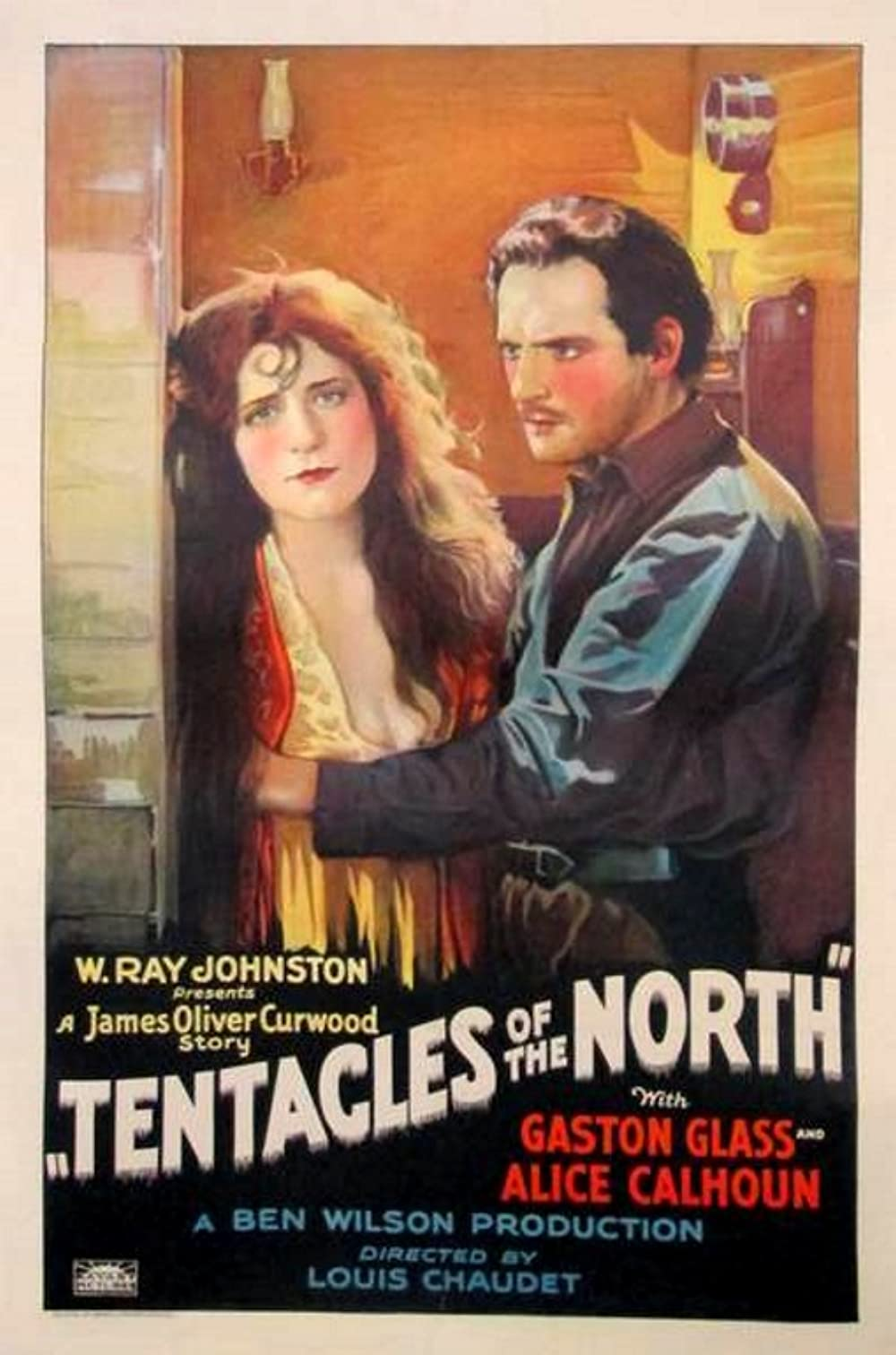
- Directed by: Louis Chaudet
- Written by: Leslie Curtis; James Oliver Curwood (story)
- Produced by: Ben F. Wilson
- Starring: Gaston Glass; Alice Calhoun; Joseph W. Girard
- Cinematography: Joseph Walker
- Edited by: Earl Turner
- Production company: Ben Wilson Productions
- Distributed by: Rayart Pictures
- Release date: November 1926
- Running time: 54 minutes
- Country: United States
- Languages: Silent; English intertitles

In the Tentacles of the North is a 1926 American silent adventure film directed by Louis Chaudet and starring Gaston Glass, Alice Calhoun and Joseph W. Girard. Two ships, on a journey led by Captain Van Horn, become trapped in ice in the Arctic Ocean. The crews have to abandon their cargo from whaling, and go out searching for a group of migrating eskimos. This is their only chance at survival. It was based on a story by James Oliver Curwood.

== Cast ==
- Gaston Glass as Francis Wainfield
- Alice Calhoun as Rac Brown
- Joseph W. Girard as Dan Blake
- Alan Roscoe as Capt. Van Horn
- Al Ferguson as Cole
- T. Hohai as Eskimo Chief
- Frank Baker as First Mate

== Preservation ==
The Library of Congress American Silent Feature Film Survival Database lists Tentacles of the North as a lost film, and is included on the lost film list compiled by the National Film Preservation Board. However, Grapevine Video has released the film on DVD, and is available to watch on YouTube.

== Bibliography ==
- Munden, Kenneth White. The American Film Institute Catalog of Motion Pictures Produced in the United States, Part 1. University of California Press, 1997.
