= The Baited Trap =

1926 film

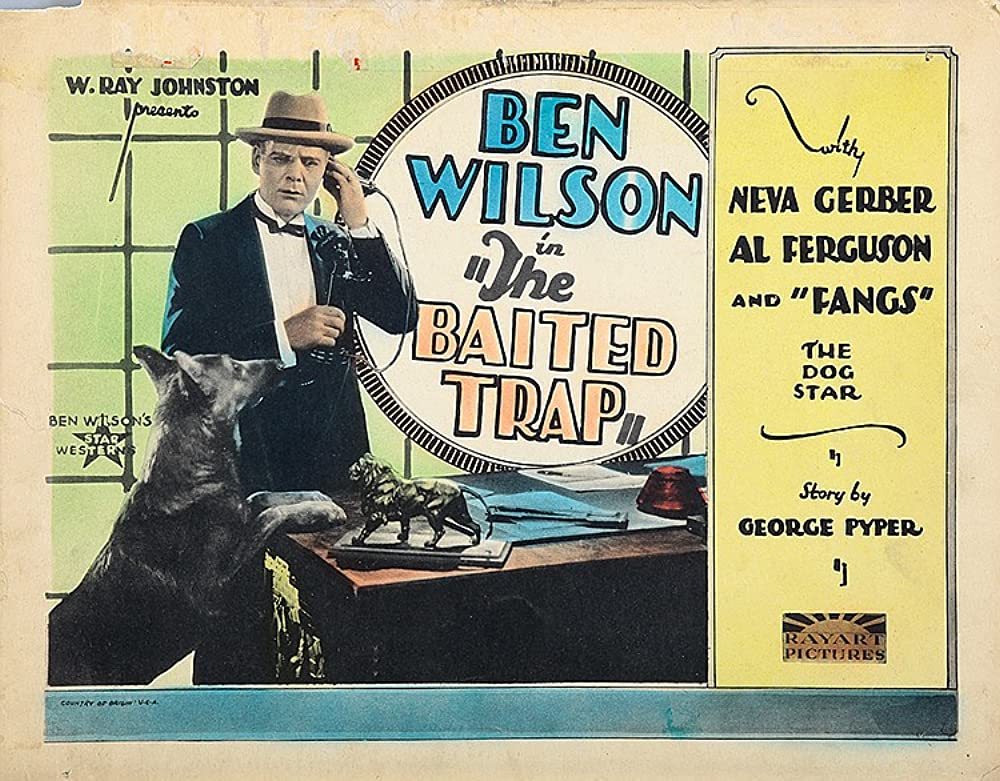
- Directed by: Stuart Paton
- Written by: George W. Pyper
- Produced by: Ben F. Wilson
- Starring: Ben F. Wilson; Neva Gerber; Al Ferguson
- Cinematography: Joseph Walker
- Production company: Ben Wilson Productions
- Distributed by: Rayart Pictures
- Release date: September 1926
- Country: United States
- Languages: Silent; English intertitles

The Baited Trap is a lost 1926 American silent Western film directed by Stuart Paton and starring Ben F. Wilson, Neva Gerber and Al Ferguson.

== Cast ==
- Ben F. Wilson as Jim Banning
- Neva Gerber as Helen Alder
- Al Ferguson as Robert Barton
- Monty O'Grady as Bobbie
- Ashton Dearholt as Red Killifer
- Lafe McKee as Bobbie's Father

== Preservation ==
With no holdings located in archives, The Baited Trap is considered a lost film.
