= Rhody Hathaway =

American actor (1868–1944)

- Born: Henry Rudolph de Fiennes; October 5, 1868; San Francisco, California, U.S.
- Died: February 18, 1944 (aged 75); Los Angeles, California, U.S.
- Burial place: Forest Lawn Memorial Park
- Other names: Henry Rudolph Defiennes, Henry Rodolph De Fiennes, Rudolph Henry de Fiennes; Marquis Henry Rudolph de Fiennes
- Occupation: Actor
- Years active: 1910s–1940s
- Spouse: Jean Hathaway (m. 1894–1938; her death)
- Children: 4, including Henry

Henry Rudolph Marquis de Fiennes (October 5, 1868 – February 18, 1944), known by the stage name Rhody Hathaway, was an American actor, publicist, and stage manager. He worked both in silent films and talkies. He was the husband of actress Jean Hathaway and the father of Oscar-nominated director Henry Hathaway.

== Early life ==
Hathaway was born Henry Rudolph de Fiennes on October 5, 1868, in San Francisco, California. His father Henry J. de Fiennes was born in Belgium, and his mother Mary Hanson was from the East Coast.

His title of Marquis was inherited from his grandfather Jean-Baptiste de Fiennes (or J.B. de Fiennes), a Belgian nobleman and barrister in service to King Leopold I of Belgium. When his grandfather failed in his commission to establish commercial relations between the Sandwich Islands (now Hawai'i) with Belgium, the disgraced Marquis self-exiled to San Francisco in 1850 where he worked as a lawyer.

== Career ==
In his early career, Hathaway worked as an advance man, and as a stage manager. By 1909, he was part of the Allan Dwan's American Film Manufacturing Company, starring in films alongside his wife Jean and sometimes with their young son Henry. From 1911 until 1914, the Hathaway family worked for Thomas Ince's Inceville Studios.

In the 1920s, Rhody abandoned his family and started to act in film.

== Personal life ==
He married Hungarian-born actress Jean Hathaway (née Lillie Bishop) in 1894 and they had four children, including film director Henry Hathaway. The family was Roman Catholic.

=== Death ===
Hathaway died on February 18, 1944, in a sanatorium in Los Angeles. He was laid to rest in the mausoleum at Forest Lawn Memorial Park.

== Filmography ==
- Not a Drum Was Heard (1924), directed by William A. Wellman; as James Ross
- Riders of the Plains (1924), directed by Jacques Jaccard
- A Daughter of the Sioux (1925), directed by Ben Wilson; as Maj. John Webb
- The Phantom of the Forest (1926), directed by Henry McCarty; as John Wallace
- Bigger Than Barnum's (1926), directed by Ralph Ince
- Into the Night (1928), directed by Duke Worne; as Jim Marden
- The Old Code (1928), directed by Ben F. Wilson; as Father Le Fane
- Whom the Gods Destroy (1934), directed by Walter Lang; as the doctor (uncredited)
- Atlantic Adventure (1935), directed by Albert S. Rogell; as the reported (uncredited)
- Fighting Shadows (1935), directed by David Selman; as the trapper or woodsman (uncredited)
- Life Begins at 40 (1935), directed by George Marshall; as the townsman (uncredited)
