= The Spindle of Life =

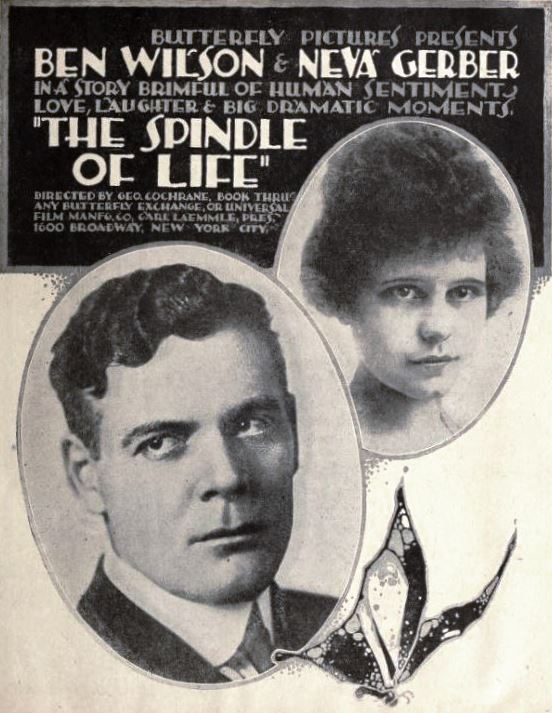
- Directed by: George Cochrane
- Written by: Karl R. Coolidge; Sidney Robinson (novel)
- Starring: Ben F. Wilson; Neva Gerber; Jessie Pratt
- Cinematography: Pliny Horne
- Production company: Universal Pictures
- Distributed by: Universal Pictures
- Release date: September 17, 1917
- Running time: 50 minutes
- Country: United States
- Languages: Silent; English intertitles

The Spindle of Life is a 1917 American silent comedy film directed by George Cochrane and starring Ben F. Wilson, Neva Gerber and Jessie Pratt.

== Cast ==
- Ben F. Wilson as 'Alphabet' Carter
- Neva Gerber as Gladsome
- Jessie Pratt as Mrs. Harrison
- Ed Brady as Jason
- Dick La Reno as Hooky
- Winter Hall as James Bradshaw
- Hayward Mack as Vincent Bradshaw

== Bibliography ==
- Goble, Alan. The Complete Index to Literary Sources in Film. Walter de Gruyter, 1999.
