= Wolves of the Desert =

1926 film

- Directed by: Ben F. Wilson
- Written by: George W. Pyper
- Produced by: Ashton Dearholt; Ben F. Wilson
- Starring: Neva Gerber; Ruth Royce; Ashton Dearholt
- Production company: Ben Wilson Productions
- Distributed by: Rayart Pictures
- Release date: November 1926
- Running time: 50 minutes
- Country: United States
- Languages: Silent; English intertitles

Wolves of the Desert is a 1926 American silent Western film directed by Ben F. Wilson and starring Neva Gerber, Ruth Royce and Ashton Dearholt.

== Cast ==
- Neva Gerber
- Ruth Royce
- Ashton Dearholt
- Al Ferguson
- Ed La Niece
- Ben F. Wilson

== Bibliography ==
- Langman, Larry. A Guide to Silent Westerns. Greenwood Publishing Group, 1992.
