= The Saddle King =

The Saddle King may refer to:

- The Saddle King (1921 film), American short silent Western film
- The Saddle King (1929 film), American silent western film
