= Haunted Island =

1928 film

- Directed by: Robert F. Hill
- Written by: Frank R. Adams
- Starring: Jack Dougherty; Helen Foster
- Distributed by: Universal Pictures
- Release date: March 26, 1928
- Country: United States
- Languages: Silent; English intertitles

Haunted Island is a 1928 American silent action film serial directed by Robert F. Hill. The serial was released in 10 chapters of two reels each, with the first episode ("A Night of Fear") released on March 26, 1928. Each episode featured a lurid title, such as "The Phantom Rider," "The Haunted Room," "The Fires of Fury," or "Buried Alive." The serial was a remake of the 1918 Universal serial The Brass Bullet, which was based on the story "Pleasure Island." As of October 2009, Haunted Island is considered a lost film. A trailer survives in the Library of Congress collection.

== Plot ==
Rosalind Joy (Helen Foster) is an heiress who has inherited a South Seas island known as Pleasure Island. A hidden cache of gold is allegedly buried on the island, which has several haunted structures. Rosalind's uncle, Spring Gilbert (Al Ferguson), wants the gold for himself and declares he will stop at nothing, not even the death of his niece, to get it. Rosalind, meanwhile, is befriended by Jerry Fitzjames (Jack Dougherty), a playwright. Unfortunately, Jerry has only recently escaped from a psychiatric hospital. Although he swears to protect Rosalind, she doubts Jerry's sanity. The two lovers race against Uncle Gilbert (who has set several traps for them) to find the treasure. In the end, Rosalind and Jerry are aided by the "Phantom Rider," a spectral horseman.

== Casting and marketing ==
Dougherty had been signed by Universal in 1924 and quickly became of the leading men in the studio's serials. However, this film was Dougherty's last for Universal.

To market the film, Universal Studios printed a unique "one-sheet"—a 27 inch by 41 inch (68.6 cm by 119.4 cm), five-color poster in the form of an old pirate map illustrated with scenes from each chapter of the serial.

== Cast ==
- Jack Dougherty as Jerry Fitzjames
- Helen Foster as Rosalind Joy
- Carl Miller as Yetor King
- Al Ferguson as Spring Gilbert
- John T. Prince as Mark Joy
- Grace Cunard as Mary Strong
- Wilbur Mack

== See also ==
- List of film serials
- List of film serials by studio
