= The Riding Comet =

1925 film

- Directed by: Ben F. Wilson
- Written by: William David Ball; George W. Pyper
- Produced by: Ben F. Wilson
- Starring: Yakima Canutt; Dorothy Wood; Robert D. Walker
- Cinematography: Donald Cunliffe; Edward Linden
- Production company: Ben Wilson Productions
- Distributed by: Film Booking Offices of America
- Release date: April 29, 1925
- Running time: 50 minutes
- Country: United States
- Languages: Silent; English intertitles

The Riding Comet or Ridin' Comet is a 1925 American silent Western film directed by Ben F. Wilson and starring Yakima Canutt, Dorothy Wood, and Robert D. Walker.

== Plot ==
As described in a film magazine review, because he is trying to hold up an irrigation project and also "butt in" on Max Underly's girl, the latter and his gang try to frame Slim Ranthers. He is lured to a ranch at night and shot in the arm. Austin Livingston, the irrigation engineer, tries to have him branded as a cattle thief, but Slim foils all their plans. He even aids Bess Livingston in getting help when her brother is injured by a cougar in time to save his life.

== Cast ==
- Yakima Canutt as Slim Ranthers
- Dorothy Wood as Bess Livingston
- Robert D. Walker as Austin Livingston
- William Donovan as Max Underly
- Archie Ricks as Sheriff
- William Hackett as Doctor
- Slim Allen as Cowhand

== Bibliography ==
- Langman, Larry. A Guide to Silent Westerns. Greenwood Publishing Group, 1992.
