= Notch Number One =

1924 film

- Directed by: Ben F. Wilson
- Written by: Daniel F. Whitcomb
- Starring: Ben F. Wilson; Marjorie Daw
- Distributed by: Arrow Film Corporation
- Release date: September 13, 1924
- Running time: 5 reels
- Country: United States
- Languages: Silent; English intertitles

Notch Number One is a 1924 American silent Western film directed, produced by and starring Ben F. Wilson. It was released under the Arrow Film Corporation label. It was also known The First Notch. This film survives in the Library of Congress collection.

== Cast ==
- Ben F. Wilson – Tom Watson
- Marjorie Daw – Dorothy Moore
- Merrill McCormick – no name
- Reed Howes – no name
- Billy Lord – Dickie Moore
