= The Sheriff of Hope Eternal =

1921 film

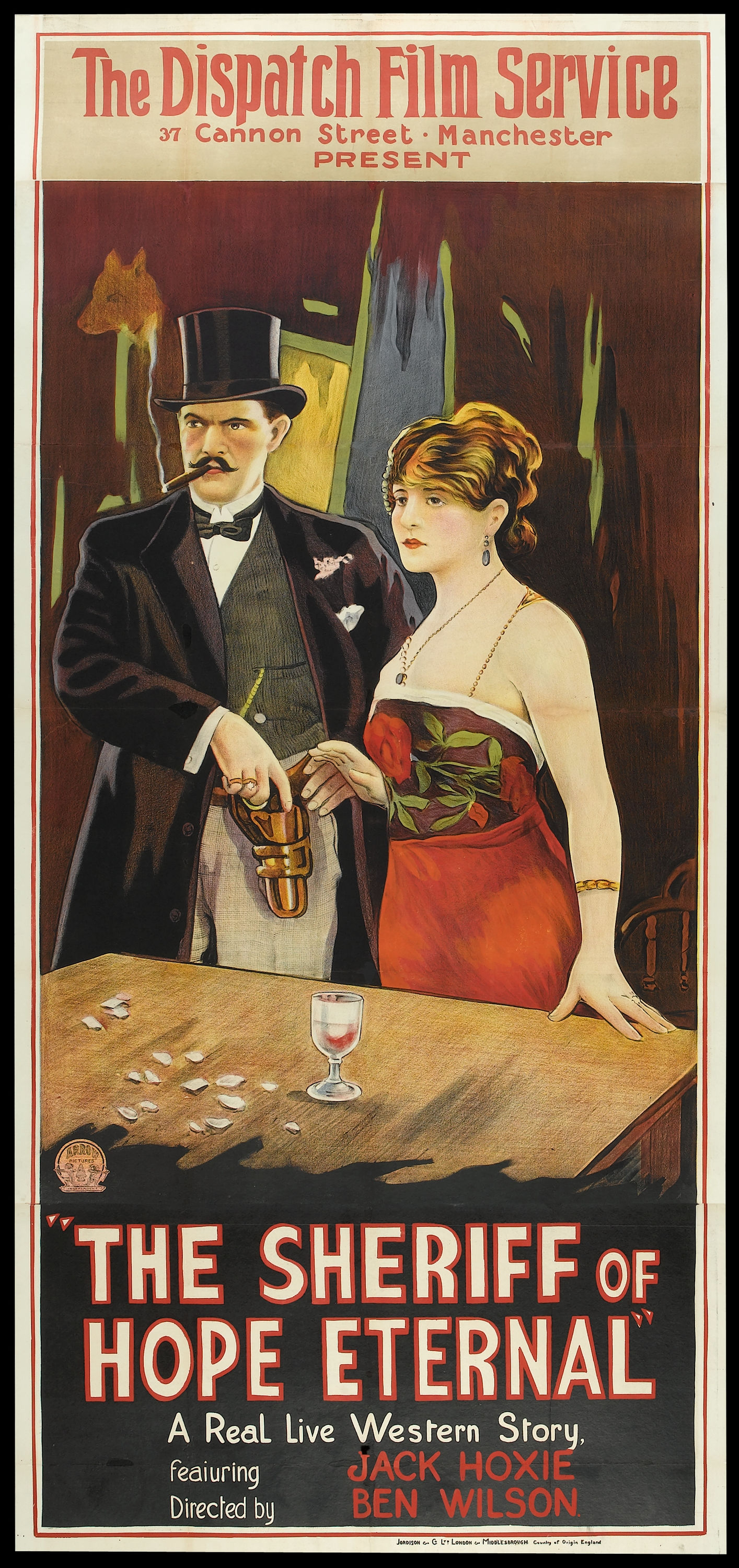
- Directed by: Ben F. Wilson
- Produced by: Ben F. Wilson
- Starring: Jack Hoxie; Marin Sais; Joseph W. Girard
- Production company: Ben Wilson Productions
- Distributed by: Arrow Film Corporation
- Release date: March 1921
- Running time: 50 minutes
- Country: United States
- Languages: Silent; English intertitles

The Sheriff of Hope Eternal is a 1921 American silent Western film directed by Ben F. Wilson and starring Jack Hoxie, Marin Sais and Joseph W. Girard.

== Plot ==
A stage coach driver, Drew Halliday, falls in love with Hela Marcale when she returns West from finishing school. After he defends her from an aggressive saloon owner and gambler, he is elected sheriff.

== Cast ==
- Jack Hoxie as Drew Halliday
- Marin Sais as Hela Marcale
- Joseph W. Girard as 'Silk' Lowry
- William Dyer as Judge Clayton
- Bee Monson as Marybelle Sawyer
- Theodore Brown as Her Father
- Wilbur McGaugh as Her Brother

== Bibliography ==
- Munden, Kenneth White. The American Film Institute Catalog of Motion Pictures Produced in the United States, Part 1. University of California Press, 1997.
