= West of the Law (1926 film) =

1926 film

- Directed by: Ben F. Wilson
- Written by: Ben F. Wilson
- Produced by: Ben F. Wilson
- Starring: Ben F. Wilson; Neva Gerber; Ashton Dearholt; Lafe McKee
- Production company: Ben Wilson Productions
- Distributed by: Rayart Pictures
- Release date: December 1926
- Running time: 50 minutes
- Country: United States
- Languages: Silent; English intertitles

West of the Law is a 1926 American silent Western film directed by Ben F. Wilson and starring Wilson, Neva Gerber, Ashton Dearholt and Lafe McKee.

== Cast ==
- Ben F. Wilson as John Adams
- Neva Gerber as Alice Armstrong
- Ashton Dearholt as Frank Armstrong
- Hal Walters as Dick Walton
- Cliff Lyons as Sheriff
- Lafe McKee as Jim Armstrong
- Al Ferguson as Surly Dorgan
- Myrna Thompson as Phyllis Parker

== Bibliography ==
- Connelly, Robert B. The Silents: Silent Feature Films, 1910-36, Volume 40, Issue 2. December Press, 1998.
- Munden, Kenneth White. The American Film Institute Catalog of Motion Pictures Produced in the United States, Part 1. University of California Press, 1997.
