= The Screaming Shadow =

1920 film

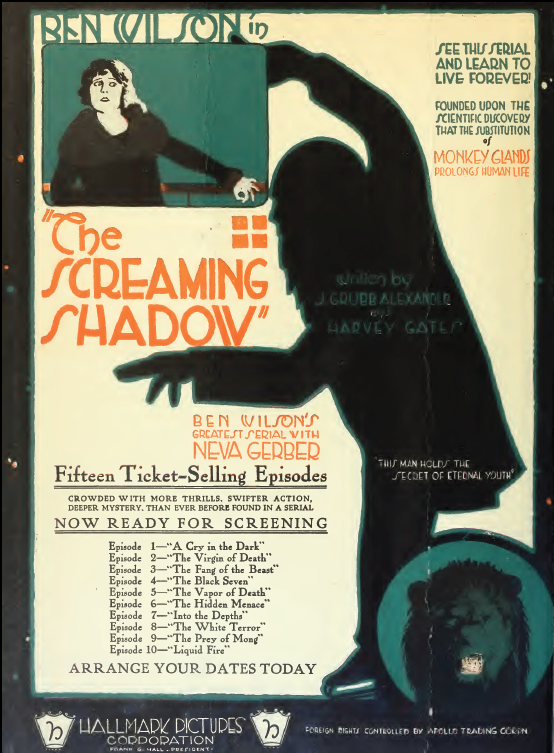
- Poster for film serial
- Directed by: Ben F. Wilson; Duke Worne
- Written by: J. Grubb Alexander (scenario); Harvey Gates (scenario)
- Starring: Ben F. Wilson; Neva Gerber
- Cinematography: King Gray
- Distributed by: Hallmark Pictures Corporation
- Release date: February 22, 1920 (United States)
- Running time: 15 episodes
- Country: United States
- Language: Silent (English intertitles)

The Screaming Shadow is a 1920 American 15-chapter silent film serial directed by Ben F. Wilson and Duke Worne. The film is considered to be lost.

== Plot ==
A criminal organization called the Black Seven are after the secret of eternal life. They also seek world domination, and their first move in that direction is to seize the royal throne of Prince Rupert of Burgonia.

== Cast ==
- Ben F. Wilson as John Rand (as Ben Wilson)
- Neva Gerber as Mary Landers
- Frances Terry as Nadia
- Howard Crampton as J.W. Russell
- Joseph W. Girard as Baron Pulska
- William Dyer as Jake Williams
- William A. Carroll as Harry Malone
- Fred Gamble as Fred Wilson
- Pansy Porter as Young maiden
- Claire Mille as Young maiden
- Joseph Manning as The butler

== Chapter titles ==
1. A Cry in the Dark
2. The Virgin of Death
3. The Fang of the Beast
4. The Black Seven
5. The Vapor of Death
6. The Hidden Menace
7. Into the Depths
8. The White Terror
9. The Sleeping Death
10. The Prey of Mong
11. Liquid Fire
12. Cold Steel
13. The Fourth Symbol
14. Entombed Alive
15. Unmasked

== See also ==
- List of film serials
- List of film serials by studio
- List of lost films
