= Into the Night (1928 film) =

1928 film

- Directed by: Duke Worne
- Written by: James Bronis; George W. Pyper; Joe Traub
- Starring: Agnes Ayres; Forrest Stanley; Corliss Palmer
- Cinematography: Jack Jellet
- Production company: Raleigh Pictures
- Distributed by: Raleigh Pictures
- Release date: August 14, 1928
- Running time: 60 minutes
- Country: United States
- Languages: Silent; English intertitles

Into the Night is a 1928 American silent crime film directed by Duke Worne and starring Agnes Ayres, Forrest Stanley and Corliss Palmer.

== Cast ==
- Agnes Ayres as Billie Mardon
- Forrest Stanley as Gavin Murdock
- Robert Russell as Walter Van Buren
- Thomas G. Lingham as Howard K. Howard
- Rhody Hathaway as Jim Marden
- Allan Sears as John Harding
- Corliss Palmer as Mrs. Harding
- Arthur Thalasso as Pat Shannon

== Preservation ==
This is a lost film.

== Bibliography ==
- Munden, Kenneth White. The American Film Institute Catalog of Motion Pictures Produced in the United States, Part 1. University of California Press, 1997.
