= The Trail of the Octopus =

1919 film

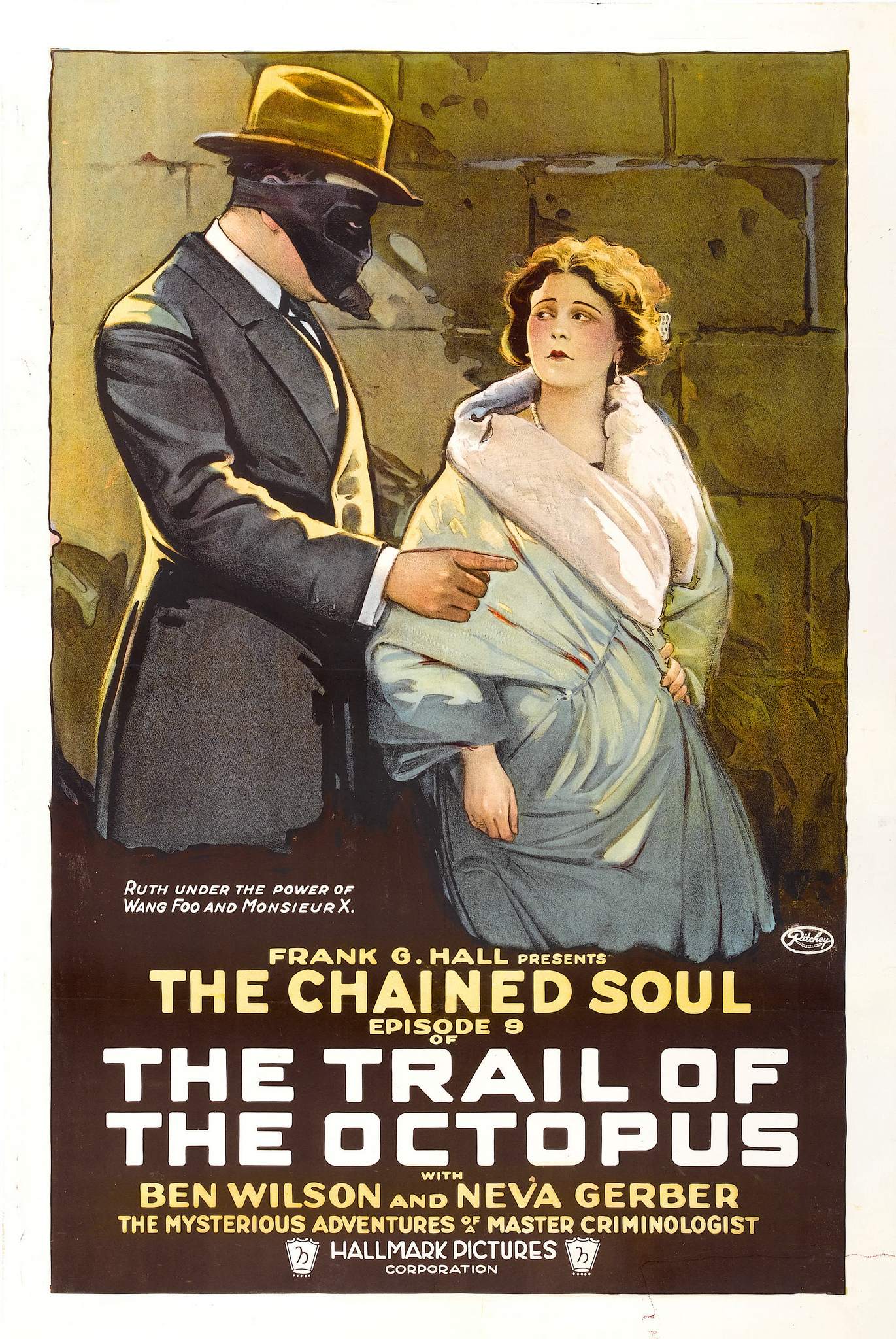
- Theatrical poster to The Trail of the Octopus
- Directed by: Duke Worne
- Story by: J. Grubb Alexander
- Starring: Ben F. Wilson; Neva Gerber
- Production company: Hallmark Pictures Corporation
- Distributed by: Film Clearing House; S.A. Lynch Enterprises
- Release date: October 1919
- Running time: 300 minutes (15 episodes)
- Country: United States
- Language: Silent (English intertitles)

The Trail of the Octopus is a 1919 American mystery film serial directed by Duke Worne. A print of The Trail of the Octopus which is missing episode 9 is in the Library of Congress. The surviving film serial has been released on DVD.

== Plot ==
An expedition to Egypt led by Dr. Stanhope discovers the ancient Tomb of Death, in which is hidden the supposedly cursed Sacred Talisman of Set, also called "The Devil's Trademark". While Dr. Stanhope and his companion are retrieving the Talisman, the expedition is attacked by desert brigands. Dr. Stanhope's companion suddenly attacks him and in the fight Stanhope kills him. but the dying man reveals that he had been sent to kill Stanhope and get the Talisman for "The Sacred Twelve". Years after his return home, Stanhope, who now lives in a state of constant fear, tells his daughter Ruth the story and warns her about the danger they are in. Stanhope tells Ruth that he has hidden the Talisman in a rock vault, which can only be opened by a combination of nine oriental daggers, one of which he has and the other eight being in the possession of fellow scientists, but before he can reveal the names of the other eight a telephone call tells him that one of the scientists has been murdered and that he will be next. Ruth calls upon her boyfriend master criminologist Carter Holmes for help, and they return to the Stanhope home only to find Dr. Stanhope dead. Now Carter and Ruth must track down the remaining seven scientists and their daggers before The Sacred Twelve, led by the mysterious masked man Monsieur X, can find them and use the daggers to recover the Talisman of Set.

== Cast ==
- Ben F. Wilson as Carter Holmes
- Neva Gerber as Ruth Stanhope
- William Dyer as Sandy MacNab
- Howard Crampton as Dr. Reid Stanhope
- William A. Carroll as Omar
- Marie Pavis as Mlle. Zora Rularde
- Al Ernest Garcia (as Allen Garcia) as Jan Al-Kasim
- Al Ernest Garcia (as E(a)rnest Garcia) as Wang Foo

== Chapter titles ==
1. The Devil's Trademark (3 reels)
2. Purple Dagger
3. Face to Face
4. The Hand of Wang
5. The Eye of Satan
6. Behind the Mask
7. The Dance of Death
8. Satan's Soulmate
9. The Chained Soul
10. The Ape Man
11. The Red Death
12. The Poisoned Talon
13. The Phantom Mandarin
14. The House of Shadows
15. The Yellow Octopus

== See also ==
- List of film serials
- List of film serials by studio
