= Chain Lightning (1922 film) =

1922 film

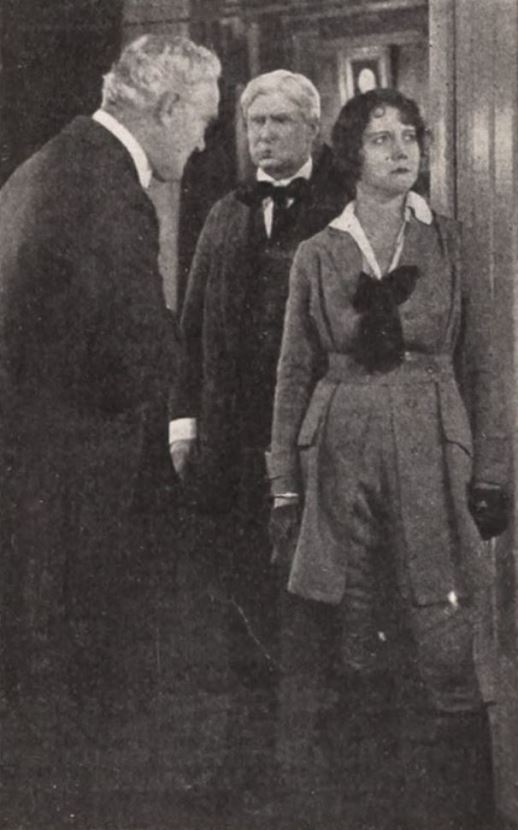
- Still from a magazine
- Directed by: Ben F. Wilson
- Written by: J. Grubb Alexander; Agnes Parsons
- Produced by: Ben Wilson
- Starring: Norval MacGregor
- Cinematography: Harry W. Gerstad
- Distributed by: Arrow Film Corporation
- Release date: April 25, 1922
- Running time: 5 reels
- Country: United States
- Language: Silent (English intertitles)

Chain Lightning is a 1922 American silent melodrama film produced and directed by Ben F. Wilson.

== Plot ==
As described in a film magazine, Kentuckian Major Lee Pomeroy (MacGregor) has been obliged by financial circumstances to sell his race horse Chain Lightning, which is really the property of his daughter Peggy (Little). She comes home from school in Washington to learn that the horse has passed to the possession of Colonel George Bradley (Girard), her father's enemy. The horse is entered in an important race and Pomeroy wagers all his remaining funds on his former track star. Red Rollins (Carroll), the jockey to ride the horse, makes advances on Peggy but is repulsed. The jockey then threatens to pull the horse in the race. Peggy meets Rollins the day of the race and endeavors to dissuade him. The vehicle they are in has an accident, and this gives Peggy the opportunity to tie up Rollins and lock him in an abandoned cabin. Making her way to the track, she dons jockey attire, don Chain Lightning, and ride him to victory in a thrilling neck and neck race. In the meantime, a romance has sprung up between the nephew of her father's enemy, Bob Bradley (Dougherty). With the winnings for her family and the winning of the race, the enmity between the Kentuckian gentlemen ends, leaving a happy ending for all except the corrupt jockey.

== Cast ==
- Norval MacGregor as Major Lee Pomeroy
- Joseph W. Girard as Col. George Bradley
- William A. Carroll as Red Rollins (credited as William Carroll)
- Jack Dougherty as Bob Bradley
- Ann Little as Peggy Pomeroy

== Preservation status ==
Chain Lightning survives in the Library of Congress collection Packard Campus for Audio-Visual Conservation.
