= Arrow Film Corporation =

American film company

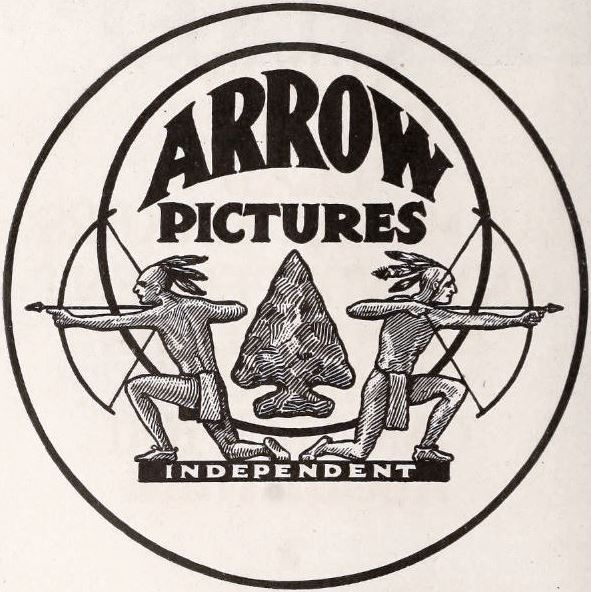
- Type: Corporation
- Industry: Motion pictures
- Founded: 1915
- Defunct: 1926
- Headquarters: New York, United States

Arrow Film Corporation was an American film production and distribution company during the silent era from 1915 to 1926. An independent company it operated alongside the established studios. Originally formed to supply films for Pathé Exchange, the company quickly separated and concentrated on a mixture of medium and low-budget productions. The company was sometimes referred to as Arrow Pictures.

Actors who appeared in Arrow productions included Clara Bow, Marjorie Daw, Jane Novak, Constance Bennett, Milton Sills, Lionel Barrymore, Dorothy Mackaill, Neva Gerber, Marin Sais, Herbert Rawlinson, Anders Randolf, Ashton Dearholt and Wallace MacDonald.

W. E. Shallenberger (William Edgar Shallenberger) managed the company. In 1918 it was announced Arrow would use Thanhouser's New Rochelle studio. W. E. Shallenberger and his brother Wilbert Shallenberger were directors of Thanhouser in 1915. They were both doctors.

== Selected filmography ==
- The Woman's Law (1916)
- Who's Guilty? (1916, serial)
- The Deemster (1917)
- Crime and Punishment (1917)
- Huns Within Our Gates (1918)
- The Struggle Everlasting (1918)
- The Profiteer (1919)
- Miss Arizona (1919)
- Fool's Gold (1919)
- The Law of Nature (1919)
- Wolves of the Street (1920)
- The Desert Scorpion (1920)

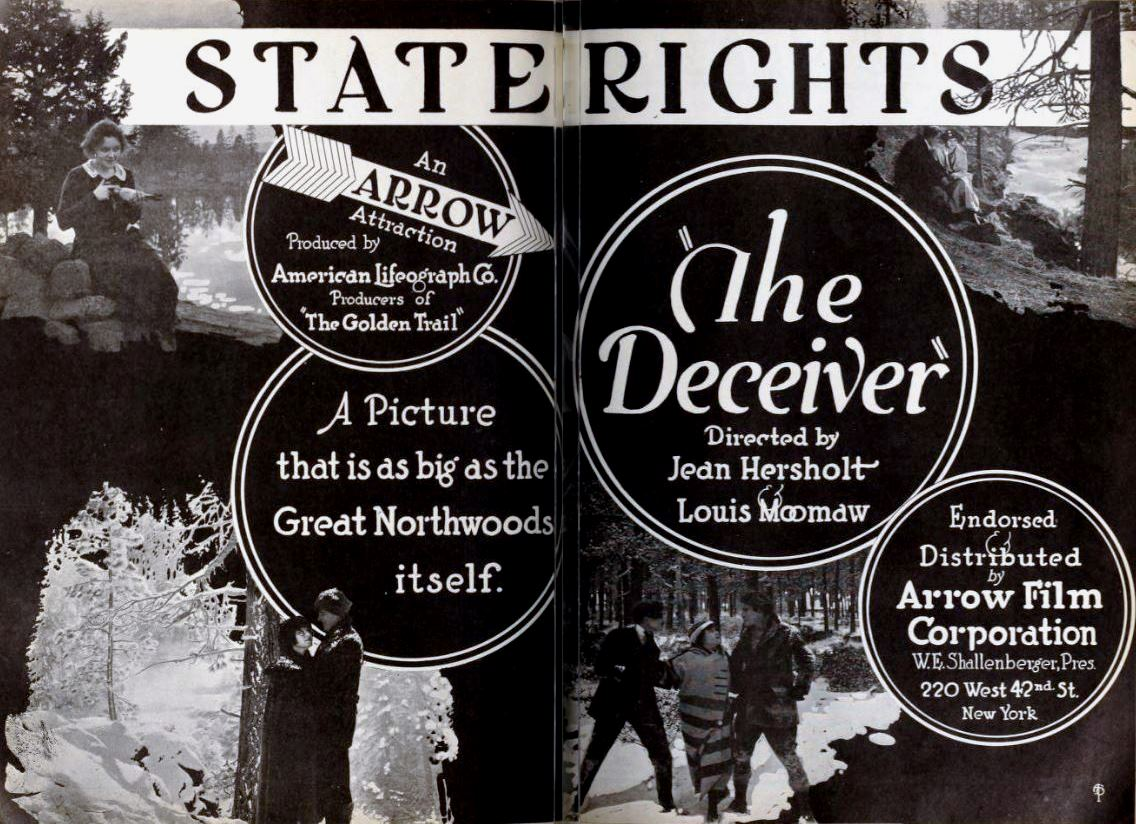
The Deceiver (1920) advertisement

- The Fatal Sign (1920, serial)
- Thunderbolt Jack (1920)
- The Way Women Love (1920)
- Bachelor Apartments (1921)
- Headin' North (1921)
- A Motion to Adjourn (1921)
- Love, Hate and a Woman (1921)
- Dangerous Paths (1921)
- Devil Dog Dawson (1921)
- Hills of Hate (1921)
- The Girl from Porcupine (1921)
- God's Country and the Law (1921)
- The Broken Spur (1921)
- The Double O (1921)
- Cyclone Bliss (1921)
- Cupid's Brand (1921)
- Dead or Alive (1921)
- The Star Reporter (1921)
- Luxury (1921)
- God's Country and the Law (1921)
- A Yankee Go Getter (1921)
- The Innocent Cheat (1921)
- The Sheriff of Hope Eternal (1921)
- Ten Nights in a Bar Room (1921)
- Night Life in Hollywood (1922)
- Back to Yellow Jacket (1922)
- One Eighth Apache (1922)
- Two-Fisted Jefferson (1922)
- The Desert Bridegroom (1922)
- The Splendid Lie (1922)
- The Broken Silence (1922)
- Chain Lightning (1922)
- Impulse (1922)
- Peaceful Peters (1922)
- The Desert's Crucible (1922)
- The Streets of New York (1922)
- At Devil's Gorge (1923)
- Jacqueline (1923)
- Sun Dog Trails (1923)
- The Devil's Dooryard (1923)
- The Lone Horseman (1923)
- The Law Rustlers (1923)
- Battling Bates (1923)
- Spawn of the Desert (1923)

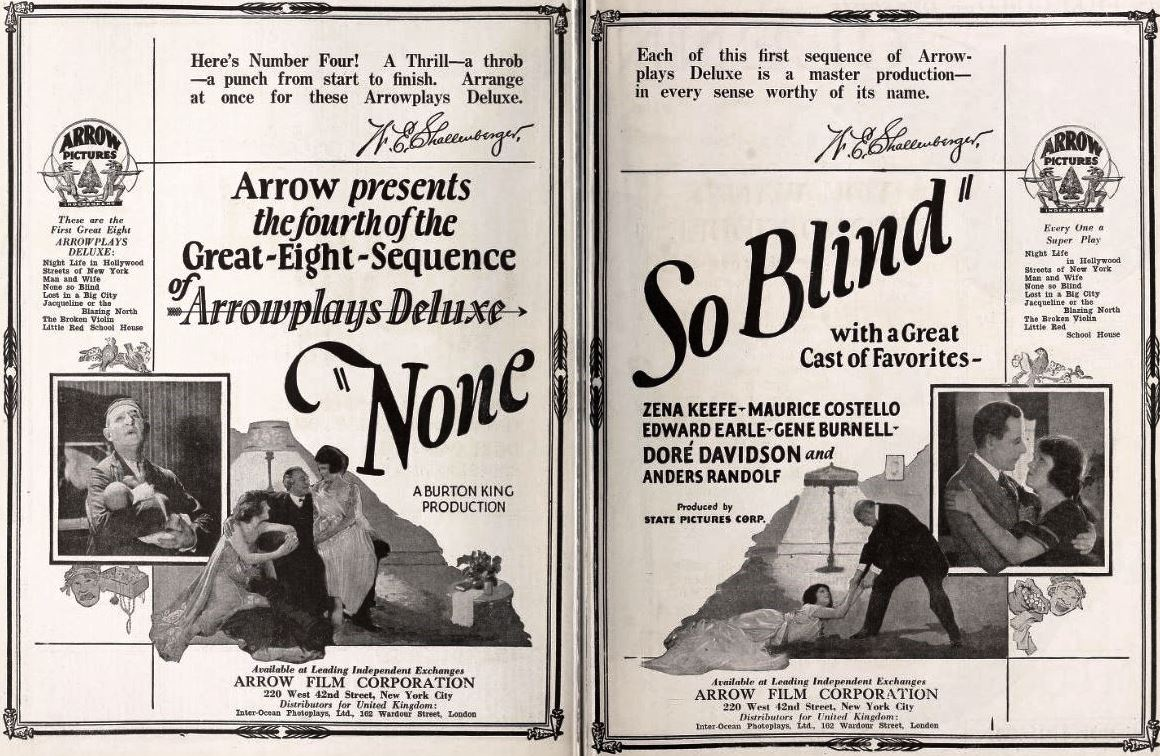
None So Blind (1923) advertising

- Sting of the Scorpion (1923)
- The Little Red Schoolhouse (1923)
- None So Blind (1923)
- Man and Wife (1923)
- The Broken Violin (1923)
- Lost in a Big City (1923)
- The Rip-Tide (1923)
- Cupid's Rustler (1924)
- The Desert Hawk (1924)
- The Diamond Bandit (1924)
- Gambling Wives (1924)
- Branded a Bandit (1924)
- Range Blood (1924)
- Ridin' Mad (1924)
- Western Feuds (1924)
- Sell 'Em Cowboy (1924)
- Notch Number One (1924)
- Two Fisted Justice (1924)
- A Rodeo Mixup (1924)
- Western Yesterdays (1924)
- Lash of the Whip (1924)
- The Fugitive (1925)
- Hearts of the West (1925)
- Vic Dyson Pays (1925)
- My Pal (1925)
- The Cactus Cure (1925)
- Romance and Rustlers (1925)
- Where Romance Rides (1925)
- A Western Engagement (1925)
- The Unnamed Woman (1925)
- A Two-Fisted Sheriff (1925)
- The Lost Chord (1925)
- Lena Rivers (1925)
- North of Nome (1925)
- Tessie (1925)
- The Substitute Wife (1925)
- The Primrose Path (1925)
- Scandal Street (1925)
- Share and Share Alike (1925)
- Children of the Whirlwind (1925)
- Wandering Fires (1925)
- My Lady of Whims (1925)
- In Borrowed Plumes (1926)

== Bibliography ==
- Slide, Anthony. The New Historical Dictionary of the American Film Industry. Routledge, 2014.
- Ward, Richard Lewis. When the Cock Crows: A History of the Pathé Exchange. SIU Press, 2016.
