= One Eighth Apache =

1922 film

- Directed by: Ben F. Wilson
- Written by: J. Grubb Alexander; Peter B. Kyne
- Produced by: Ben F. Wilson
- Starring: Roy Stewart; Kathleen Kirkham; Wilbur McGaugh
- Production company: Berwilla Film Corporation
- Distributed by: Arrow Film Corporation
- Release date: July 15, 1922
- Running time: 50 minutes
- Country: United States
- Languages: Silent; English intertitles

One Eighth Apache is a 1922 American silent Western film directed by Ben F. Wilson and starring Roy Stewart, Kathleen Kirkham and Wilbur McGaugh.

== Cast ==
- Roy Stewart as Brant Murdock
- Kathleen Kirkham as Norma Biddie
- Wilbur McGaugh as Charlie Longdeer
- George M. Daniel as Tyler Burgess
- Dick La Reno as Joseph Murdock

== Bibliography ==
- Munden, Kenneth White. The American Film Institute Catalog of Motion Pictures Produced in the United States, Part 1. University of California Press, 1997.
