= Romance and Rustlers =

1925 film

- Directed by: Ben F. Wilson
- Written by: George Morgan
- Starring: Yakima Canutt; Dorothy Wood; Joseph W. Girard
- Production company: Arrow Film Corporation
- Distributed by: Arrow Film Corporation
- Release date: March 1, 1925
- Running time: 50 minutes
- Country: United States
- Languages: Silent; English intertitles

Romance and Rustlers is a 1925 American silent Western film directed by Ben F. Wilson and starring Yakima Canutt, Dorothy Wood and Joseph W. Girard.

== Cast ==
- Yakima Canutt as Bud Kane
- Dorothy Wood as Ruth Larrabee
- Harris Gordon as George Wallace
- Joseph W. Girard as John Larrabee

== Bibliography ==
- Connelly, Robert B. The Silents: Silent Feature Films, 1910-36, Volume 40, Issue 2. December Press, 1998.
- Langman, Larry. A Guide to Silent Westerns. Greenwood Publishing Group, 1992.
- Munden, Kenneth White. The American Film Institute Catalog of Motion Pictures Produced in the United States, Part 1. University of California Press, 1997.
