= A Captain's Courage =

1926 film

- Directed by: Louis Chaudet
- Written by: James Oliver Curwood (story); George W. Pyper
- Starring: Edward Earle; Dorothy Dwan; Lafe McKee
- Production company: Ben Wilson Productions
- Distributed by: Rayart Pictures
- Release date: November 30, 1926
- Country: United States
- Languages: Silent; English intertitles

A Captain's Courage is a 1926 American silent drama film directed by Louis Chaudet and starring Edward Earle, Dorothy Dwan and Lafe McKee. The film is still extant, per the Library of Congress.

== Cast ==
- Edward Earle
- Dorothy Dwan
- Lafe McKee
- Ashton Dearholt
- Jack Henderson
- Al Ferguson

== Bibliography ==
- Munden, Kenneth White. The American Film Institute Catalog of Motion Pictures Produced in the United States, Part 1. University of California Press, 1997.
