= Three Keys =

1925 film

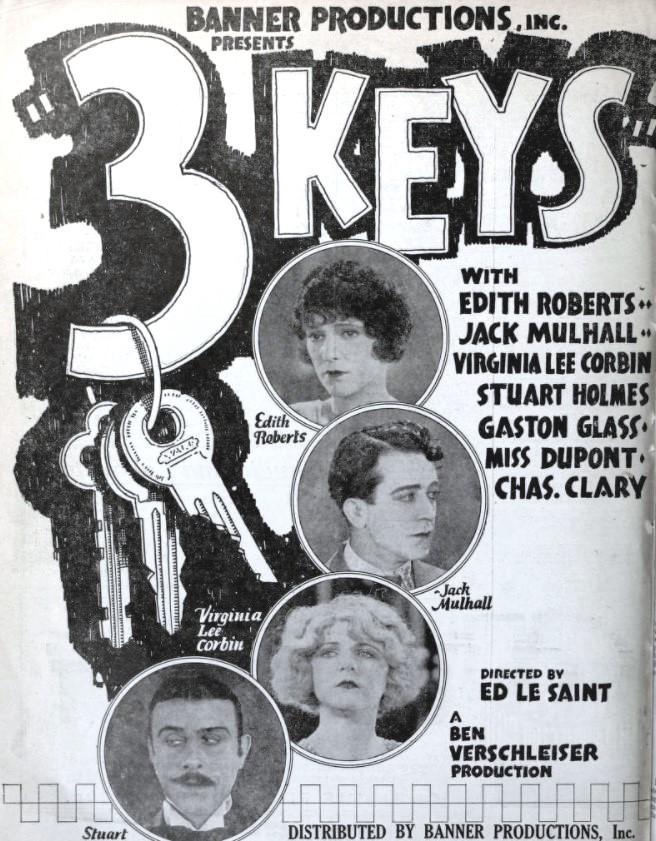
- Directed by: Edward LeSaint
- Written by: Frederic Van Rensselaer Dey (novel); Robert A. Dillon
- Produced by: Ben Verschleiser
- Starring: Edith Roberts; Jack Mulhall; Gaston Glass
- Cinematography: Ernest Haller
- Production company: Banner Productions
- Distributed by: Henry Ginsberg Distributing Company
- Release date: January 1, 1925
- Running time: 60 minutes
- Country: United States
- Languages: Silent; English intertitles

Three Keys is a 1925 American silent drama film directed by Edward LeSaint and starring Edith Roberts, Jack Mulhall and Gaston Glass.

== Cast ==
- Edith Roberts as Clarita Ortega
- Jack Mulhall as Jack Millington
- Gaston Glass as George Lathrop
- Virginia Lee Corbin as Edna Trevor
- Miss DuPont as Alice Trevor
- Charles Clary as John Trevor
- Stuart Holmes as Fenwick Chapman
- Joseph W. Girard as Sam Millington

== Bibliography ==
- Munden, Kenneth White. The American Film Institute Catalog of Motion Pictures Produced in the United States, Part 1. University of California Press, 1997.
