= The Voice from the Sky =

1930 film

- Directed by: Ben F. Wilson
- Written by: Robert Dillon
- Produced by: Ben F. Wilson
- Starring: Wally Wales; Neva Gerber
- Cinematography: William Nobles
- Edited by: Frederick Bain
- Production company: G.Y.B. Productions
- Distributed by: Hollywood Pictures Corporation
- Release date: January 1, 1930
- Running time: 10 episodes
- Country: United States
- Language: English

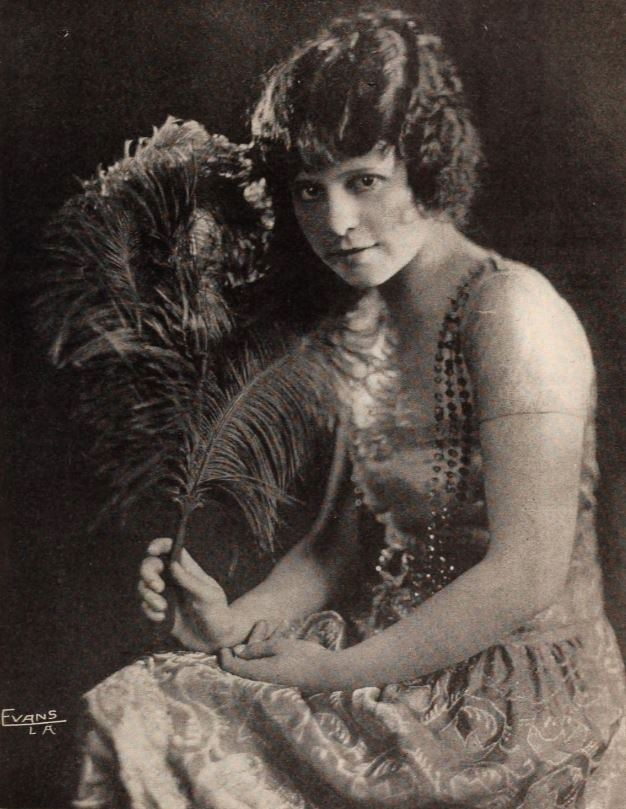
Neva Gerber, who played Jean Lovell

The Voice from the Sky is a 1930 American science fiction film serial directed by Ben F. Wilson and starring Wally Wales and Neva Gerber. The film is considered to be a lost film. It is the first serial film to have full sound.

== Cast ==
- Wally Wales as Jack Deering, U. S. Secret Service
- Neva Gerber (as Jean Dolores) as Jean Lovell
- Robert Walker as Edgar Ballin
- J. P. Lockney as Geoffrey Mentor
- Al Haskell as Henchman 'Patch-Eye'
- Cliff Lyons as Henchman 'Humpy'
- John C. McCallum as J. C. Gates
- Merle Farris as Mrs. Deering (Jack's mother)
- The Man from Nowhere (a mysterious black-cloaked figure)

== List of episodes ==
1. Doomed
2. The Cave of Horrors
3. The Man from Nowhere
4. Danger Ahead
5. Desperate Deeds
6. Trail of Vengeance
7. The Scarlet Scourge
8. Trapped by Fate
9. The Pit of Peril
10. Hearts of Steel

== See also ==
- List of film serials
- List of film serials by studio
