= Howard Crampton =

American actor (1865–1922)

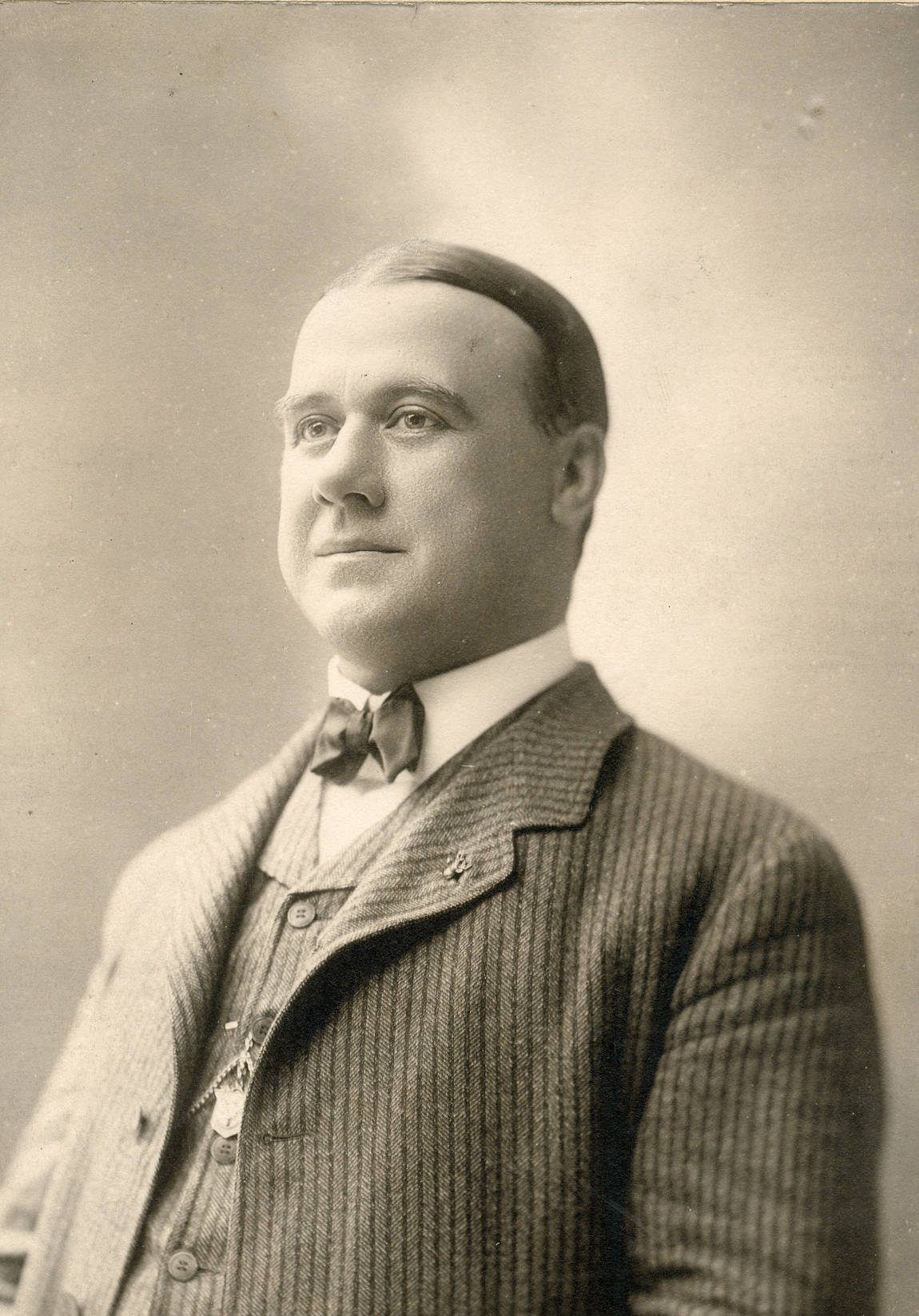
- Born: January 12, 1865; New York, New York, United States
- Died: June 15, 1922 (aged 57)
- Occupation: Actor
- Years active: 1913–22

Howard Crampton (January 12, 1865 – June 15, 1922) was an American actor of the silent era. He appeared in more than 70 films between 1913 and 1922. He was born in New York City.

== Partial filmography ==
- Dr. Jekyll and Mr. Hyde (1913)
- Traffic in Souls (1913)
- The Chalice of Sorrow (1916)
- The Great Problem (1916)
- Black Orchids (1917)
- The Voice on the Wire (1917)
- The Gray Ghost (1917)
- The Scarlet Car (1917)
- Like Wildfire (1917)
- The Wife He Bought (1918)
- Humdrum Brown (1918)
- With Hoops of Steel (1918)
- The Border Raiders (1918)
- The Voice of Destiny (1918)
- The Devil's Trail (1919)
- The Lion's Den (1919)
- The Trail of the Octopus (1919)
- Hearts Are Trumps (1920)
- The Screaming Shadow (1920)
- The Midlanders (1920)
- The Bronze Bell (1921)
- Judge Her Not (1921)
- Nan of the North (1922)
