= The Voice on the Wire =

1917 film

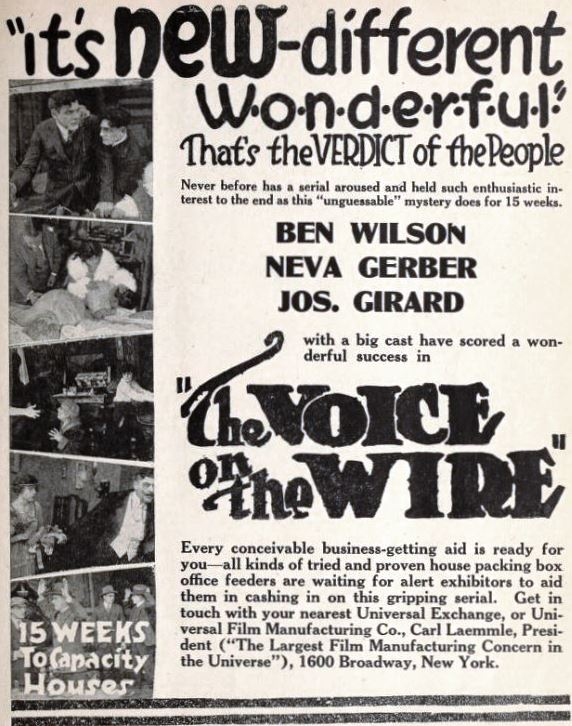
- Trade advertisement
- Directed by: Stuart Paton
- Written by: J. Grubb Alexander
- Starring: Ben F. Wilson
- Distributed by: Universal Studios
- Release date: March 18, 1917
- Country: United States
- Language: Silent (English intertitles)

The Voice on the Wire is a 1917 American action film serial directed by Stuart Paton. It is presumed to be lost.

== Cast ==
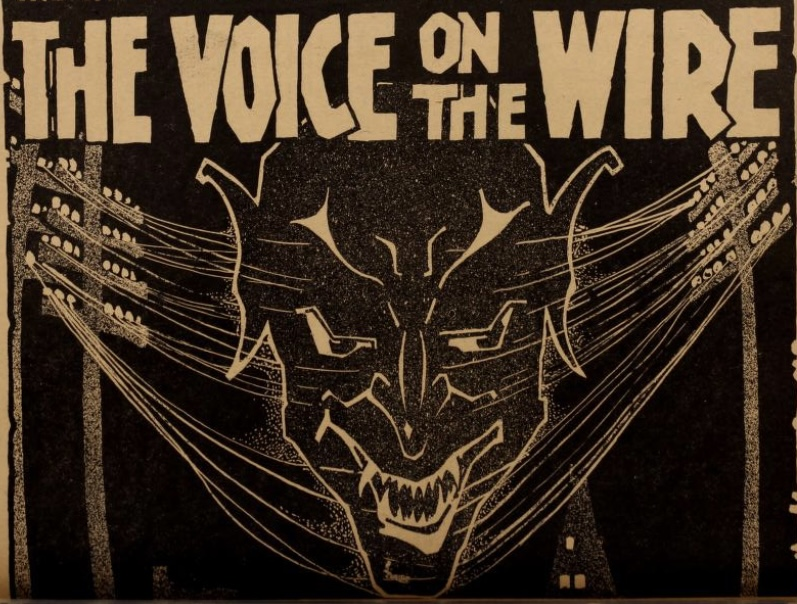
The Voice on the Wire advert

- Ben F. Wilson as John Shirley (credited as Ben Wilson)
- Neva Gerber as Polly Marion
- Joseph W. Girard as Dr. Reynolds
- Francis McDonald as "Red" Warren
- Kingsley Benedict
- William Canfield as William Grimsby
- Nigel De Brulier
- Howard Crampton
- L. M. Wells
- Frank MacQuarrie
- Frank Tokunaga
- Ernest Shields
- Hoot Gibson
- Josephine Hill

== Chapter titles ==
1. The Oriental Death Punch
2. The Mysterious Man
3. The Spider's Web
4. The Next Victim
5. The Spectral Hand
6. The Death Warrant
7. The Marked Room
8. High Finance
9. A Stern Chase
10. The Guarded Heart
11. The Thought Machine
12. The Sign of The Thumb
13. Twixt Death and Dawn
14. The Light Dawn
15. The Living Death

== See also ==
- Hoot Gibson filmography
- List of lost films
