= Fort Frayne =

1926 film

- Directed by: Ben F. Wilson
- Written by: George W. Pyper
- Based on: Fort Frayne by Charles King
- Produced by: Ben F. Wilson; J. Charles Davis
- Starring: Ben F. Wilson; Neva Gerber; Ruth Royce; Lafe McKee
- Cinematography: Alfred Gosden
- Production company: Guaranteed Pictures
- Distributed by: Davis Distributing Division
- Release date: January 11, 1926
- Running time: 50 minutes
- Country: United States
- Language: Silent (English intertitles)

Fort Frayne is a lost 1926 American silent Western film directed by Ben F. Wilson and starring Wilson, Neva Gerber, Ruth Royce, and Lafe McKee. It is based on the 1901 novel of the same name by Charles King.

== Plot ==
As described in a film magazine reviews, Captain Malcolm Teale loves Helen Farrar, daughter of Colonel John Farrar. The Colonel, fatally wounded in an Indian fight, tells Teale that his son Royle, believed dead, is actually alive and a fugitive from justice. Following the death of the Colonel, his wife takes as a companion the woman who is the son's wife. The fugitive son joins the Army and meets his wife when he is assigned to the post. A series of coincidences entangle Teale, the son, and the son's wife, resulting in Teale and Helen becoming estranged. However, after some explanations, the difficulties are resolved.

== Cast ==
- Ben F. Wilson as Capt. Malcolm Teale
- Neva Gerber as Helen Farrar
- Ruth Royce as Mrs. Daunton
- Bill Patton as Royle Farrar/Graice
- Lafe McKee as Col. John Farrar

== Preservation ==
With no holdings located in archives, Fort Frayne is considered a lost film.

== Bibliography ==
- Connelly, Robert B. The Silents: Silent Feature Films, 1910-36, Volume 40, Issue 2. December Press, 1998.
- Munden, Kenneth White. The American Film Institute Catalog of Motion Pictures Produced in the United States, Part 1. University of California Press, 1997.
