= A Two-Fisted Sheriff =

1925 film

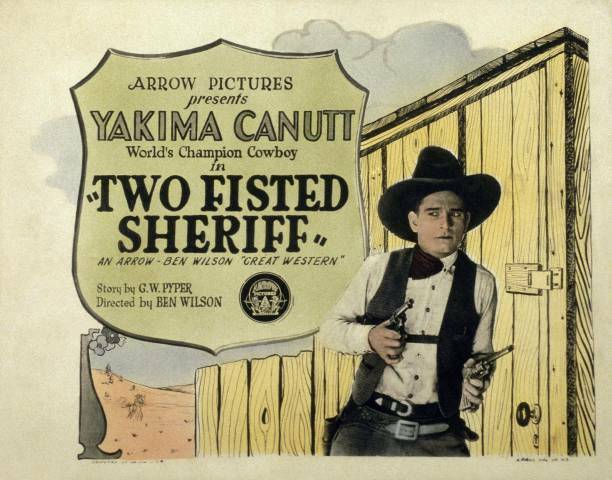
- Directed by: Ben F. Wilson
- Written by: George W. Pyper
- Produced by: Ben F. Wilson
- Starring: Yakima Canutt; Ruth Stonehouse; Joe Rickson
- Production company: Ben Wilson Productions
- Distributed by: Arrow Film Corporation
- Release date: April 12, 1925
- Running time: 50 minutes
- Country: United States
- Languages: Silent; English intertitles

A Two-Fisted Sheriff is a 1925 American silent Western film directed by Ben F. Wilson and starring Yakima Canutt, Ruth Stonehouse and Joe Rickson.

== Cast ==
- Yakima Canutt as Jerry O'Connell
- Ruth Stonehouse as Midge Blair
- Art Walker as Stranger
- Clifford Davidson as Stranger
- Jack Woods as Stranger
- Joe Rickson as George Rivers
- Ben F. Wilson

== Bibliography ==
- Connelly, Robert B. The Silents: Silent Feature Films, 1910-36, Volume 40, Issue 2. December Press, 1998.
- Munden, Kenneth White. The American Film Institute Catalog of Motion Pictures Produced in the United States, Part 1. University of California Press, 1997.
