= Dangerous Paths =

1921 film

- Directed by: Duke Worne
- Written by: Joseph W. Girard
- Produced by: Ben F. Wilson
- Starring: Neva Gerber; Ben F. Wilson; Edith Stayart
- Production company: Berwilla Film Corporation
- Distributed by: Arrow Film Corporation
- Release date: July 1921
- Running time: 50 minutes
- Country: United States
- Languages: Silent; English intertitles

Dangerous Paths is a 1921 American silent drama film directed by Duke Worne and starring Neva Gerber, Ben F. Wilson and Edith Stayart.

== Cast ==
- Neva Gerber as Ruth Hammond
- Ben F. Wilson as John Emerson
- Edith Stayart as Violet Benson
- Joseph W. Girard as Silas Newton
- Henry Van Sickle as Noah Hammond
- Helen Gilmore as Deborah Hammond

== Bibliography ==
- Munden, Kenneth White. The American Film Institute Catalog of Motion Pictures Produced in the United States, Part 1. University of California Press, 1997.
