= The Fugitive (1925 film) =

1925 film

- Directed by: Ben F. Wilson
- Written by: Jacques Jaccard
- Produced by: Ben F. Wilson
- Starring: Ruth Stonehouse; Wilbur McGaugh; Joseph W. Girard
- Production company: Arrow Film Corporation
- Distributed by: Arrow Film Corporation
- Release date: May 3, 1925
- Running time: 50 minutes
- Country: United States
- Languages: Silent; English intertitles

The Fugitive is a lost 1925 American silent Western film directed by Ben F. Wilson and starring Ruth Stonehouse, Wilbur McGaugh and Joseph W. Girard.

== Cast ==
- Ruth Stonehouse as The Girl
- Wilbur McGaugh as Yaqui Kid
- Ben F. Wilson as The Man
- Natalie La Supervia as Lolita Mendez
- Joseph W. Girard asSatan Saunders
- Helene Rosson as The Sister

== Preservation ==
With no holdings located in archives, The Fugitive is considered a lost film.

== Bibliography ==
- Connelly, Robert B. The Silents: Silent Feature Films, 1910-36, Volume 40, Issue 2. December Press, 1998.
- Munden, Kenneth White. The American Film Institute Catalog of Motion Pictures Produced in the United States, Part 1. University of California Press, 1997.
