= The Saddle King (1929 film) =

1929 film

- Directed by: Ben F. Wilson
- Written by: Bennett Cohen
- Produced by: Morris R. Schlank
- Starring: Cliff Lyons; Neva Gerber; Al Ferguson
- Cinematography: Robert E. Cline
- Edited by: Earl Turner
- Production company: Morris R. Schlank Productions
- Distributed by: Anchor Film Distributors
- Release date: September 5, 1929
- Running time: 50 minutes
- Country: United States
- Languages: Silent; English intertitles

The Saddle King is a 1929 American silent Western film directed by Ben F. Wilson and starring Cliff Lyons, Neva Gerber and Al Ferguson.

== Cast ==
- Cliff Lyons as Rance Baine
- Neva Gerber as Felice Landreau
- Al Ferguson as Mort Landreau
- Glen Cook as Dr. Harvey Baine
- Jack Casey as Sam Winters
- Cheyenne Bill
- Irving Wafford
- Victor Allen

== Bibliography ==
- Connelly, Robert B. The Silents: Silent Feature Films, 1910-36, Volume 40, Issue 2. December Press, 1998.
- Munden, Kenneth White. The American Film Institute Catalog of Motion Pictures Produced in the United States, Part 1. University of California Press, 1997.
