= Branded a Bandit =

1924 film

- Directed by: Paul Hurst
- Written by: Paul Hurst
- Produced by: Ben F. Wilson
- Starring: Yakima Canutt; Judge Hamilton; Wilbur McGaugh
- Production company: Ben Wilson Productions
- Distributed by: Arrow Film Corporation
- Release date: December 20, 1924
- Running time: 58 minutes
- Country: United States
- Languages: Silent; English intertitles

Branded a Bandit is a 1924 American silent Western film directed by Paul Hurst and starring Yakima Canutt, Judge Hamilton and Wilbur McGaugh.

== Cast ==
- Yakima Canutt as Jess Dean
- Judge Hamilton as Granddaddy Jim Turner
- Wilbur McGaugh as 'Horse' Williams
- Alys Murrell as Jennie Turner

== Preservation ==
With no holdings located in archives, Branded a Bandit is considered a lost film.

== Bibliography ==
- Langman, Larry. A Guide to Silent Westerns. Greenwood Publishing Group, 1992.
- Munden, Kenneth White. The American Film Institute Catalog of Motion Pictures Produced in the United States, Part 1. University of California Press, 1997.
