= A Daughter of the Sioux =

1925 film

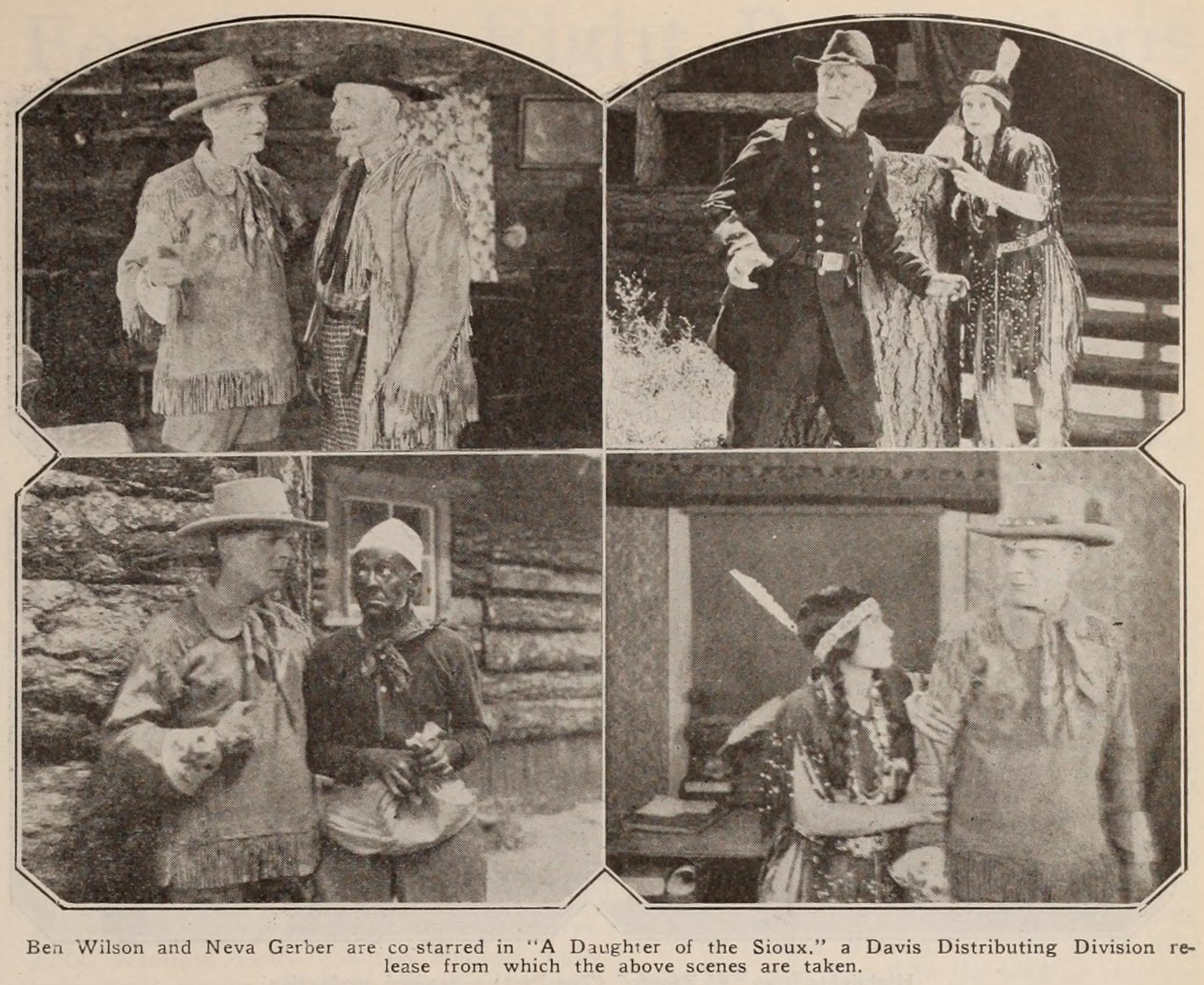
- Directed by: Ben Wilson
- Screenplay by: George W. Pyper
- Based on: A Daughter of the Sioux, a Tale of the Indian Frontier by Charles King
- Starring: Ben Wilson; Neva Gerber; Robert Walker
- Cinematography: William E. Fildew
- Production company: Guaranteed Pictures
- Distributed by: Davis Distributing Division
- Release date: December 28, 1925 (US)
- Running time: 5 reels
- Country: United States
- Languages: Silent; English intertitles

A Daughter of the Sioux is a 1925 American silent Western film directed by Ben Wilson. It stars Ben Wilson, Neva Gerber, and Robert Walker, and was released on December 28, 1925.

== Plot summary ==
John Field is a U.S. Government surveyor. Nanette is the adopted daughter of Cavalry Major John Webb. Field suspects Nanette of giving information about Fort Frayne's defenses to the Sioux tribe.

Eagle Wing convinces the Sioux to attack some isolated settlers. During the attack, Field witnesses Nanette talking with Eagle Wing. Field fights with Eagle Wing and kills him. Field returns to the fort with Eagle Wing's body.

A scout recognizes Nanette as a girl who had been kidnapped by the Sioux as an infant and raised by the tribe. Nanette admits this is true, and also that Eagle Wing is actually the long-lost son of Big Bill Hay.

Field has fallen in love with Nanette and proposes marriage.

== Cast list ==
- Ben Wilson as John Field
- Neva Gerber as Nanette
- Robert Walker as Eagle Wing
- Fay Adams as Trooper Kennedy
- William A. Lowery as Big Bill Hay
- Rhody Hathaway as Major John Webb

== Themes ==
While some films of the era fall into what is described as "helper films" which sought to portray Native Americans in a romanticized portrayal of "the noble red man", another common trope is the opposite of this theme, portraying Native Americans as blood-thirsty savages at war with white America. A Daughter of the Sioux is an example of the latter type, with the Sioux portrayed as untrustworthy enemies of the settlers.

== Production ==
The film is an adaptation of Charles King's 1903 book A Daughter of the Sioux, a Tale of the Indian Frontier, a book that inspired several Westerns of the silent film era. The book had previously been adapted into a film of the same name in 1909, and this 1925 film may have been a remake.
