= Back to Yellow Jacket =

1922 film

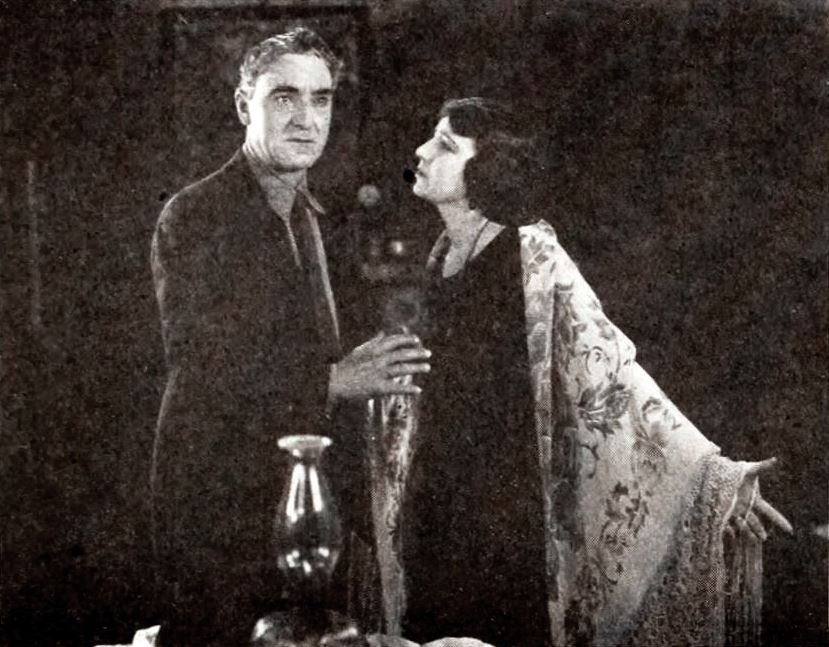
- Directed by: Ben F. Wilson
- Written by: J. Grubb Alexander; Peter B. Kyne
- Produced by: Ben F. Wilson
- Starring: Roy Stewart; Kathleen Kirkham; Earl Metcalfe
- Cinematography: Harry W. Gerstad
- Production company: Ben Wilson Productions
- Distributed by: Arrow Film Corporation
- Release date: March 14, 1922
- Running time: 60 minutes
- Country: United States
- Languages: Silent; English intertitles

Back to Yellow Jacket is a 1922 American silent Western film directed by Ben F. Wilson and starring Roy Stewart, Kathleen Kirkham and Earl Metcalfe.

== Cast ==
- Roy Stewart as Jim Ballantyne
- Kathleen Kirkham as Carmen, his wife
- Earl Metcalfe as Flush Kirby
- Jack Pratt as William Carson
- Bessie Loo

== Preservation ==
With no holdings located in archives, Back to Yellow Jacket is considered a lost film.

== Bibliography ==
- Connelly, Robert B. The Silents: Silent Feature Films, 1910-36, Volume 40, Issue 2. December Press, 1998.
