= Vic Dyson Pays =

1925 film

- Directed by: Jacques Jaccard
- Written by: William E. Wing
- Produced by: Ben F. Wilson
- Starring: Ben F. Wilson; Neva Gerber; Joseph W. Girard
- Production company: Ben Wilson Productions
- Distributed by: Arrow Film Corporation
- Release date: January 3, 1925
- Running time: 50 minutes
- Country: United States
- Languages: Silent; English intertitles

Vic Dyson Pays is a 1925 American silent Western film directed by Jacques Jaccard and starring Ben F. Wilson, Neva Gerber and Joseph W. Girard.

== Cast ==
- Ben F. Wilson as 'Mad' Vic Dyson
- Archie Ricks as Skip
- Neva Gerber as Neva
- Victor Allen as Madden
- Merrill McCormick as Albert Stacey
- Joseph W. Girard as Dayton Keever
- Dad Learned as Dr. Crandall

== Bibliography ==
- Connelly, Robert B. The Silents: Silent Feature Films, 1910-36, Volume 40, Issue 2. December Press, 1998.
- Langman, Larry. A Guide to Silent Westerns. Greenwood Publishing Group, 1992.
- Munden, Kenneth White. The American Film Institute Catalog of Motion Pictures Produced in the United States, Part 1. University of California Press, 1997.
