= Joseph W. Girard =

American actor (1871–1949)

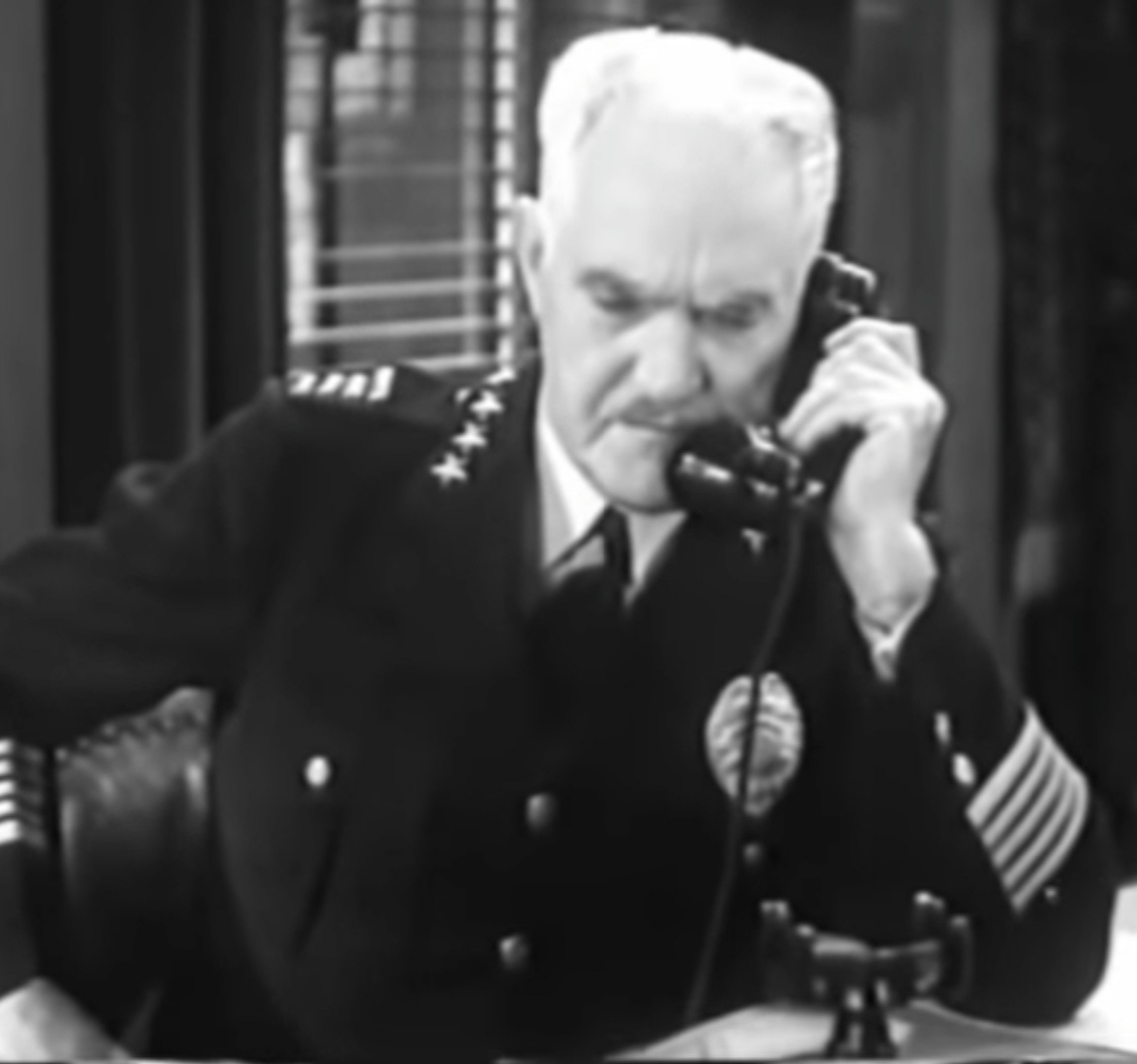
- Girard in Officer Thirteen (1932)
- Born: Joseph W. Girard; April 2, 1871; Williamsport, Pennsylvania, U.S.
- Died: August 21, 1949 (aged 78); Woodland Hills, Los Angeles, U.S.
- Occupation: Actor
- Years active: 1911–1944

Joseph W. Girard (April 2, 1871 – August 21, 1949) was an American film actor. He appeared in more than 280 films between 1911 and 1944. He was born in Williamsport, Pennsylvania, and died in Woodland Hills, Los Angeles.

Before he became an actor, Girard was a printer who worked for newspapers until he and a partner set up their own printing business in Philadelphia. Girard had an interest in the theater, however, and eventually sold his part of the printing company and focused on acting.

Girard's work on stage included a decade as a member of the Corse Payton Stock Company in New York City. His initial work in film was with the Edison Company, after which he made films for Universal.

== Selected filmography ==
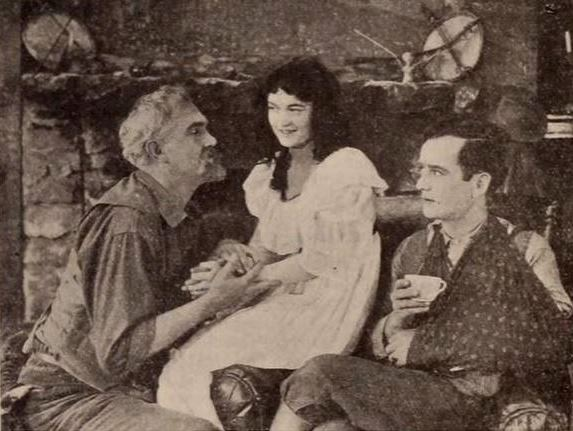
Girard (left) with Donna Drew and Leo Pierson in the 1917 film '49–'17

- The Active Life of Dolly of the Dailies (1914, Serial) – Home Towner [Ch. 12]
- Shotgun Jones (1914, Short)
- Conscience (1915) – The Warden
- Love's Pilgrimage to America (1916) – Captain Sparks
- The Lords of High Decision (1916) – Colonel Craighill
- A Huntress of Men (1916) – Fleming Harcourt
- The Man from Nowhere (1916) – Gov. Dudley Ward
- The Narrow Path (1916) – John Martin
- 20,000 Leagues Under the Sea (1916) – Maj. Cameron (uncredited)
- Hell Morgan's Girl (1917)
- The Double Standard (1917)
- The Lair of the Wolf (1917)
- Fear Not (1917)
- Society's Driftwood (1917)
- '49–'17 (1917)
- The Voice on the Wire (1917)
- Treason (1917)
- Beloved Jim (1917)
- The Bride's Awakening (1918)
- The Brass Bullet (1918)
- Danger, Go Slow (1918)
- The Marriage Lie (1918)
- Her Body in Bond (1918)
- The Two-Soul Woman (1918)
- A Soul for Sale (1918)
- Bare Fists (1919)
- What Am I Bid? (1919)
- The Midnight Man (1919)
- The Fatal Sign (1920)
- The Figurehead (1920)
- The Screaming Shadow (1920)
- Dangerous Paths (1921)
- The Blue Fox (1921)
- Red Courage (1921)
- Dead or Alive (1921)
- The Sheriff of Hope Eternal (1921)
- Nan of the North (1922)
- Chain Lightning (1922)
- Step on It! (1922)
- Perils of the Yukon (1922)
- One Wonderful Night (1922)
- Three Jumps Ahead (1923)
- The Eagle's Talons (1923)
- Lovebound (1923)
- The Law Rustlers (1923)
- Where is This West? (1923)
- The Night Hawk (1924)
- Wolves of the North (1924)
- Leave It to Gerry (1924)
- Battling Mason (1924)
- Jack O'Clubs (1924)
- Reckless Speed (1924)
- Laughing at Danger (1924)
- The Lighthouse by the Sea (1924)
- Speed Madness (1925)
- The Pride of the Force (1925)
- Youth and Adventure (1925)
- Vic Dyson Pays (1925)
- Romance and Rustlers (1925)
- The Fugitive (1925)
- Three Keys (1925)
- Lord Jim (1925)
- The Dangerous Dub (1926)
- The Boaster (1926)
- The Night Owl (1926)
- Speed Crazed (1926)
- Tentacles of the North (1926)
- Flying High (1926)
- Driftin' Thru (1926)
- Ladies of Leisure (1926)
- We're in the Navy Now (1926)
- The Warning Signal (1926)
- Lightning Reporter (1926)
- The Flying Mail (1926)
- Out of the Storm (1926)
- Doubling with Danger (1926)
- The High Flyer (1926)
- The Ladybird (1927)
- In the First Degree (1927)
- The Silent Hero (1927)
- The Final Extra (1927)
- The Noose (1928)
- The Shield of Honor (1928)
- Broken Barriers (1928)
- The Bullet Mark (1928)
- Four Sons (1928)
- The Code of the Scarlet (1928)
- Marlie the Killer (1928)
- The Terror (1928)
- The Fleet's In (1928)
- King of the Rodeo (1929)
- Troopers Three (1930)
- The Girl of the Golden West (1930)
- The Third Alarm (1930)
- Dishonored (1931)
- Is There Justice? (1931)
- Scareheads (1931)
- Desert Vengeance (1931)
- Defenders of the Law (1931)
- The Hurricane Express (1932)
- The Big Stampede (1932)
- The Crusader (1932)
- Silent Men (1933)
- Via Pony Express (1933)
- The Whirlwind (1933)
- The Woman Who Dared (1933) as Police captain
- His Fighting Blood (1935)
- Blazing Guns (1935)
- Outlaw Rule (1935)
- Frontier Justice (1935)
- The Oregon Trail (1936)
- The Drag-Net (1936)
- What Becomes of the Children? (1936)
- Frontier Scout (1938)
- Crashing Thru (1939)
- Captain Midnight (1942)
