= George W. Pyper =

American screenwriter

- Born: April 6, 1886; Salt Lake City, Utah, United States
- Died: January 18, 1965 (aged 78); Van Nuys, California, United States
- Occupation: Writer
- Years active: 1920–1929 (film)

George W. Pyper (1886–1965) was an American screenwriter of the silent era. He was also a novelist. Pyper wrote the scripts for many productions made by FBO and Rayart Pictures, generally action films and westerns. He also worked on several serials for Universal Pictures.

== Partial filmography ==
- The Branded Four (1920)
- The Vanishing Dagger (1920)
- The Diamond Queen (1921)
- Broad Daylight (1922)
- The Ghost City (1923)
- The Riddle Rider (1924)
- The Air Hawk (1924)
- The Fighting Ranger (1925)
- A Daughter of the Sioux (1925)
- Flyin' Thru (1925)
- The Riding Comet (1925)
- A Two-Fisted Sheriff (1925)
- Tonio, Son of the Sierras (1925)
- Riders of Mystery (1925)
- Scar Hanan (1925)
- Fort Frayne (1926)
- The Baited Trap (1926)
- A Captain's Courage (1926)
- Wolves of the Desert (1926)
- The Gallant Fool (1926)
- Avenging Fangs (1927)
- The Fighting Stallion (1927)
- Daring Deeds (1927)
- The Royal American (1927)
- The Silent Hero (1927)
- The Wheel of Destiny (1927)
- Heroes in Blue (1927)
- The Cruise of the Hellion (1927)
- The Racing Fool (1927)
- The City of Purple Dreams (1928)
- Into the Night (1928)
- Son of the Golden West (1928)
- Isle of Lost Men (1928)
- The Law's Lash (1928)
- Marlie the Killer (1928)
- All Faces West (1929)
- Outlawed (1929)
- The Drifter (1929)

== Bibliography ==
- George A. Katchmer. Eighty Silent Film Stars: Biographies and Filmographies of the Obscure to the Well Known. McFarland, 1991.
- Mavis, Paul. The Espionage Filmography: United States Releases, 1898 through 1999. McFarland and Company, 2001.
