= Al Ferguson =

Irish-American actor

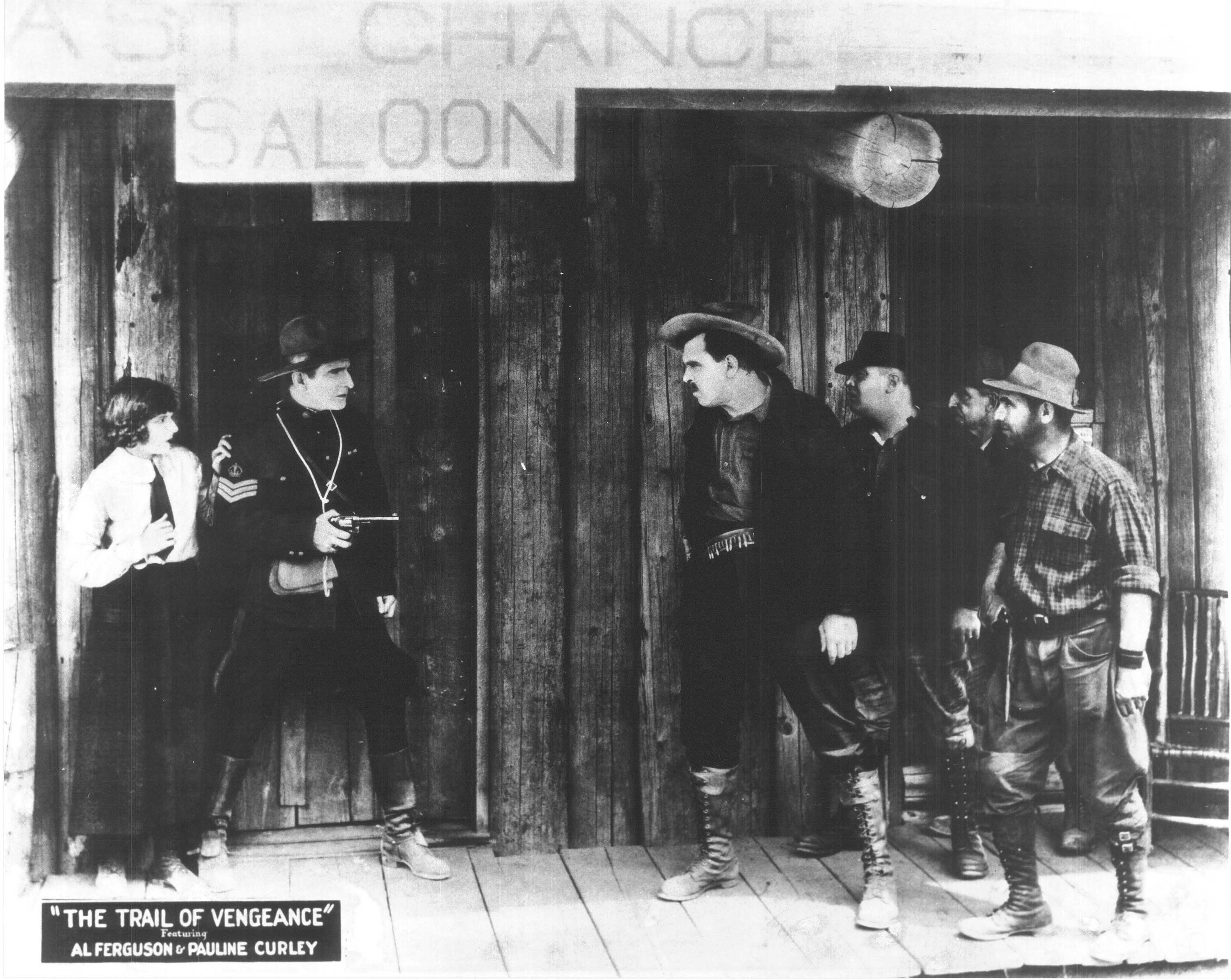
- Al Ferguson and Pauline Curley in The Trail of Vengeance (1924), filmed in Beaverton, Oregon
- Born: 19 April 1888; County Wexford, Ireland
- Died: 4 December 1971 (aged 83); Burbank, California, United States
- Occupation: Actor
- Years active: 1912–1956

Al Ferguson (19 April 1888 – 4 December 1971) was an Irish-born American film actor.

Born in County Wexford, Ireland, he appeared in nearly 300 films between 1912 and 1956. Billed as Smoke Ferguson, by 1912 he was making Westerns for Selig Polyscope Company. In the 1920s he was the star, producer, and director for several low-budget Western films. He also appeared in some television Westerns in the 1950s.

Ferguson died in Burbank, California. He is interred at Glendale's Forest Lawn Memorial Park Cemetery.

== Selected filmography ==
- Youth's Endearing Charm (1916) – Joe Jenkins
- Where the West Begins (1919)
- The Timber Queen (1922)
- Boomerang Justice (1922)
- The Trail of Vengeance (1924)
- The Fighting Romeo (1925)
- Officer 444 (1926)
- The Baited Trap (1926)
- Tentacles of the North (1926)
- A Captain's Courage (1926)
- West of the Law (1926)
- Wolves of the Desert (1926)
- The Wolf Hunters (1926)
- The Fighting Stallion (1927)
- Western Courage (1927)
- The Range Riders (1927)
- Haunted Island (1928)
- Tarzan the Mighty (1928)
- The Avenging Rider (1928)
- The Little Buckaroo (1928)
- The Vagabond Cub (1929)
- The Pirate of Panama (1929)
- The Man from Nevada (1929)
- Tarzan the Tiger (1929)
- The Saddle King (1929)
- Pueblo Terror (1931)
- Riders of the North (1931)
- Red Fork Range (1931)
- Two-Gun Caballero (1931)
- The Hurricane Express (1932)
- The Lost Special (1932)
- The Desert Trail (1935)
- The Laramie Kid (1935)
- The Raven (1935)
- Frontiers of '49 (1939)
- The Invisible Killer (1939)
- Deadwood Dick (1940)
- Billy the Kid's Gun Justice (1940)
- Texas to Bataan (1942)
- Law of the Saddle (1943)
- The Pearl of Death (1944)
- The Utah Kid (1944)
- Rustlers' Hideout (1944)
- Harmony Trail (1944)
- God's Country (1946)
- Overland Riders (1946)
- Wild West (1946)
- Lightning Raiders (1946)
- Along the Great Divide (1951)
- The Band Wagon (1953)
- Blazing the Overland Trail (1956)
