= Officer 444 =

1926 film

- Directed by: Francis Ford; Ben F. Wilson
- Written by: Francis Ford
- Produced by: J. Charles Davis
- Starring: Ben F. Wilson; Neva Gerber
- Cinematography: Jack Jackson; Joseph Walker
- Edited by: Earl Turner
- Release date: May 15, 1926
- Running time: 10 episodes (200 minutes)
- Country: United States
- Language: Silent with English intertitles

Officer 444 is a 1926 film serial directed by Francis Ford and Ben F. Wilson, produced by Goodwill Productions and released by the independent Davis Distributing Division. The film is available on DVD from both Grapevine Video and Alpha.

== Plot ==
Officer 444, a heroic policeman, does battle with The Frog, a criminal mastermind who is trying to get his hands on Haverlyte, a formula that is so powerful whoever had it would possess enough power to control the entire world.

== Cast ==
- Ben F. Wilson - Officer 444
- Neva Gerber - Gloria Grey
- Ruth Royce - The Vulture
- Al Ferguson - Dr. Blakely
- Lafe McKee - Capt. Jerry Dugan
- Jack Mower - Officer Patrick Michael Casey
- Arthur Beckel - James J. Haverly
- Harry McDonald - Snoopy
- Frank Baker - Dago Frank
- Philip Ford - Haverly's Son (as Phil Ford)
- Francis Ford - Fire Chief
- Margaret Mann - Nurse
- August Vollmer - Himself - August Vollmer

== Production ==
During filming in Berkley, two stunt performers were injured. Ben F. Wilson's double, Roy Steele, was climbing hand-over-hand along a wire when he fell on his back onto the net below. In another scene, Frank Baker fell backward from a window and hit the edge of the net, injuring him. Both were taken to Berkley General Hospital and survived.

== See also ==
- List of film serials
- List of film serials by studio
