= The Brass Bullet =

1918 film

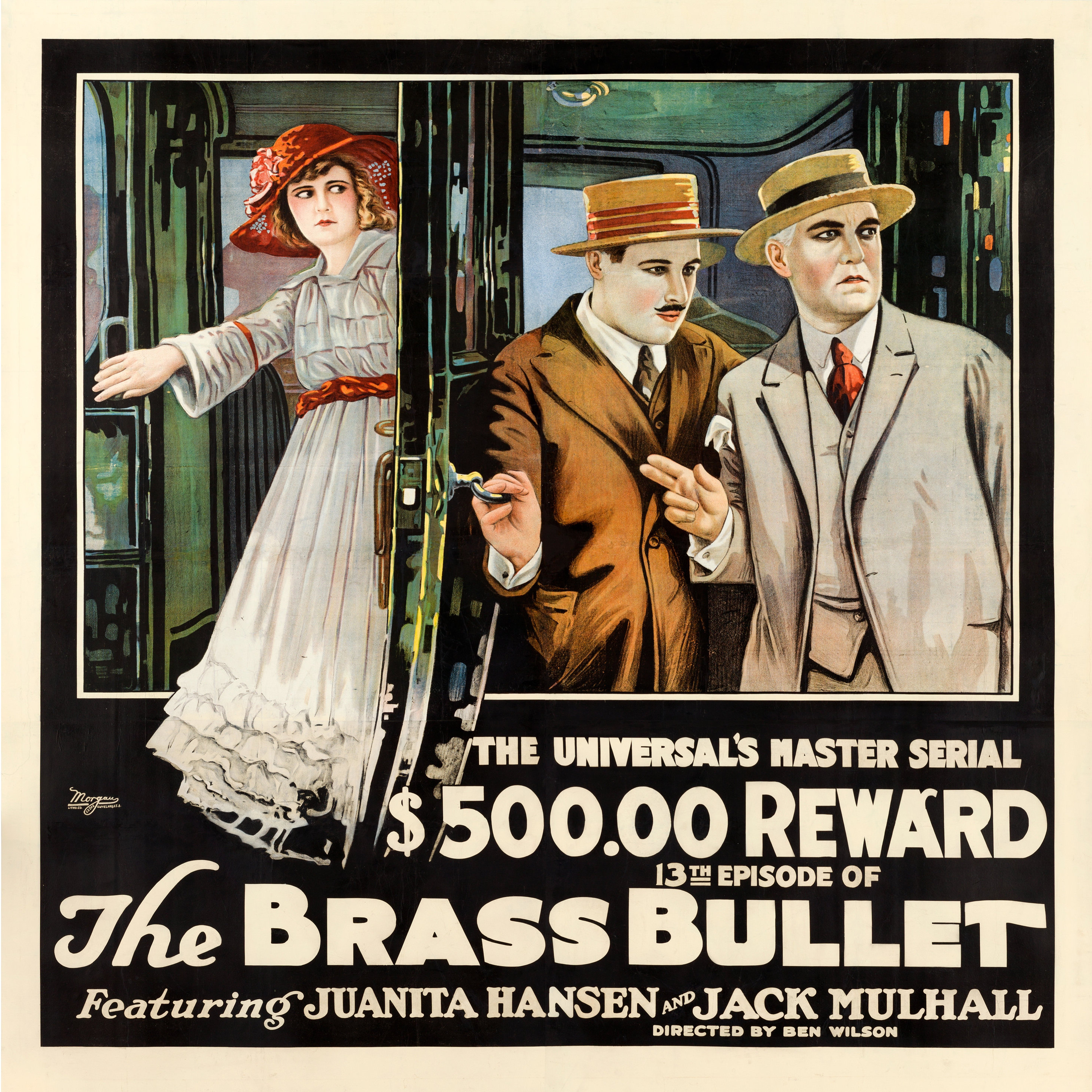
- Film poster
- Directed by: Ben F. Wilson
- Written by: Frank R. Adams; Walter Woods
- Produced by: Ben F. Wilson
- Starring: Juanita Hansen; Jack Mulhall; Refik Kemal Arduman
- Distributed by: Universal Film Manufacturing Co.
- Release date: August 10, 1918
- Running time: 18 episodes
- Country: United States
- Language: Silent (English intertitles)

The Brass Bullet is a 1918 American silent adventure film serial directed by Ben F. Wilson. It is now considered to be a lost film.

== Cast ==
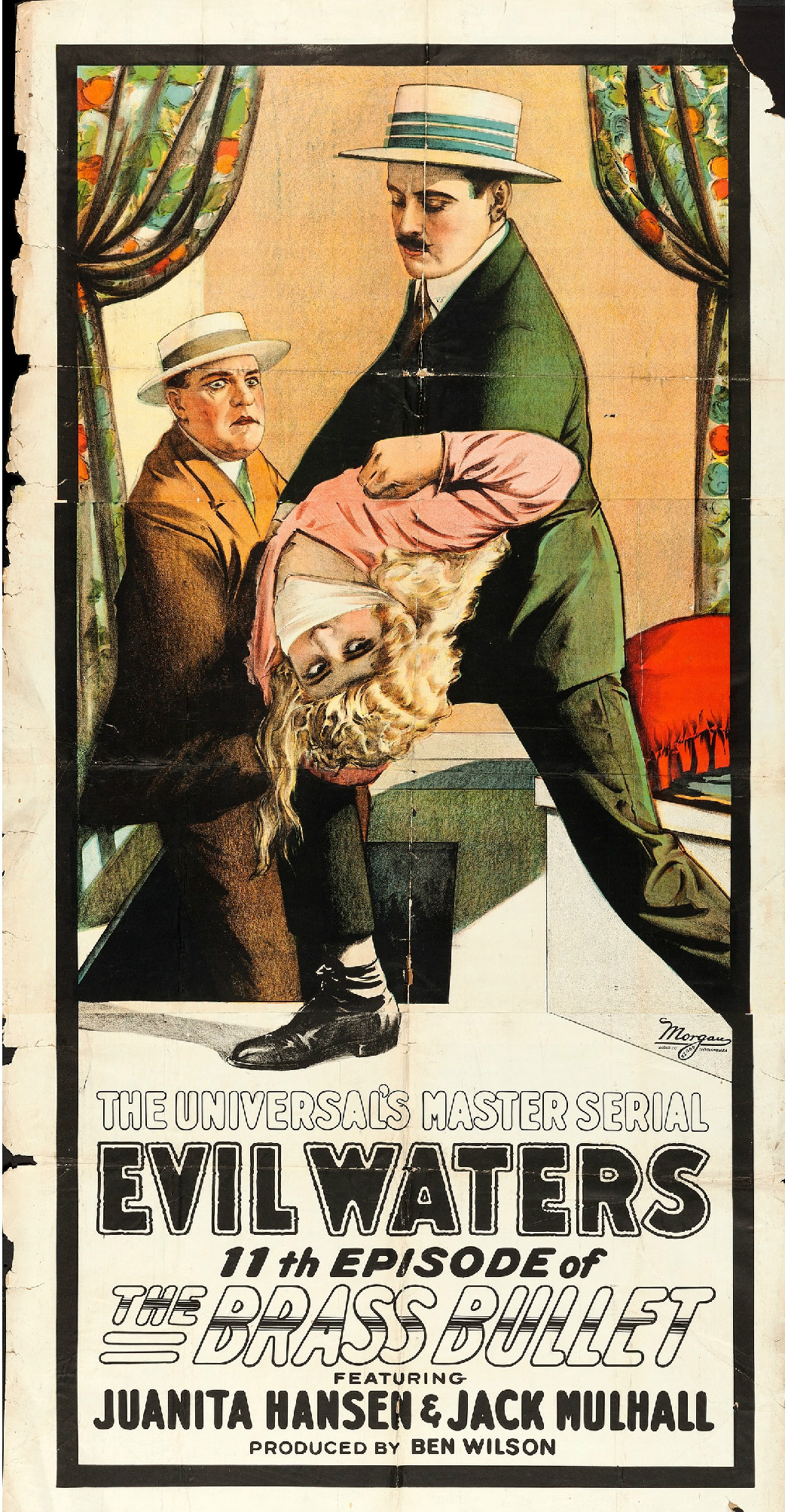
Poster for episode 11, "Evil Waters"

- Juanita Hansen as Rosalind Joy
- Jack Mulhall as Jack James
- Charles Hill Mailes as Homer Joy
- Joseph W. Girard as Spring Gilbert
- Harry Dunkinson
- Helen Wright as Mrs. Strong
- Ashton Dearholt as Victor King
- Charles Force as A minister
- Hallam Cooley as The Mystery Man

== Chapter titles ==
1. A Flying Start
2. The Muffled Man
3. The Mysterious Murder
4. Smoked Out
5. The Mock Bride
6. A Dangerous Honeymoon
7. Pleasure Island
8. The Magnetic Bug
9. The Room of Flame
10. A New Peril
11. Evil Waters
12. Caught By Wireless
13. $500 Reward
14. On Trial For His Life
15. In The Shadow
16. The Noose
17. The Avenger
18. The Amazing Confession

== Reception ==
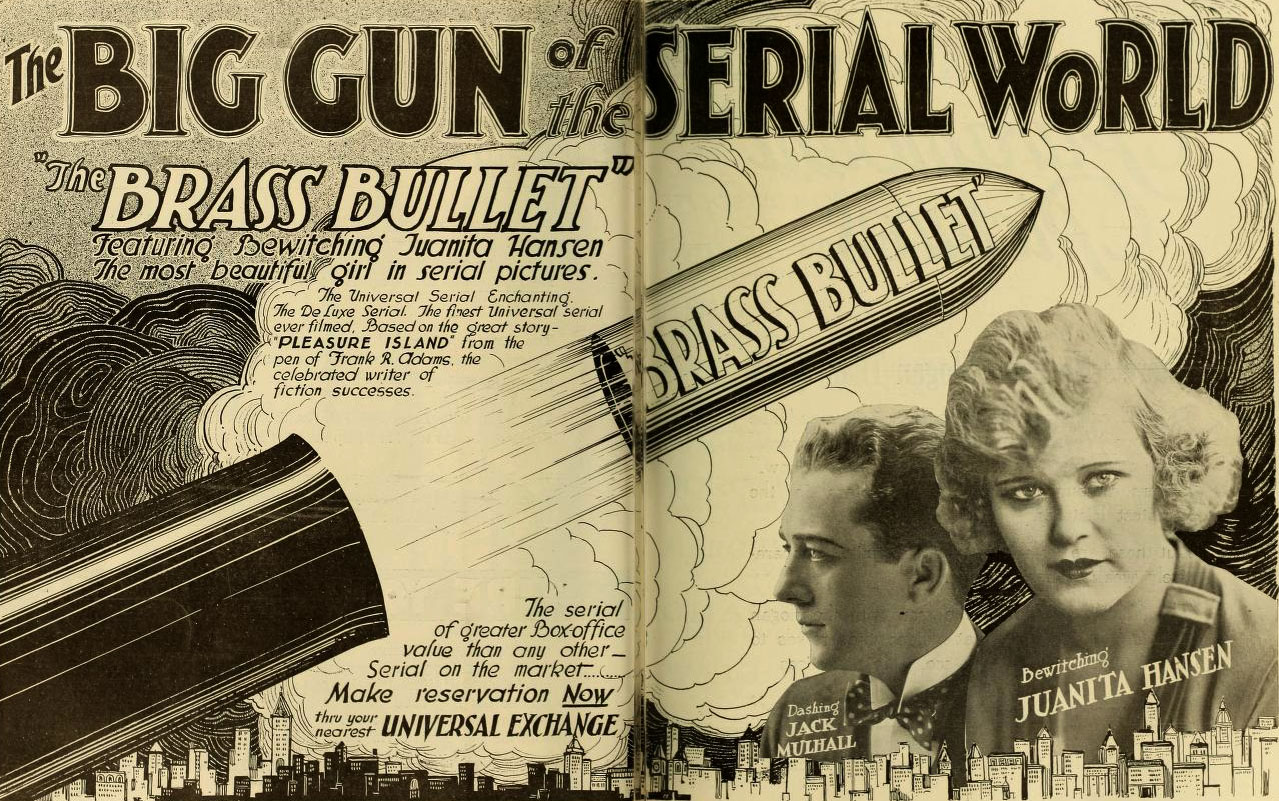
Advertisement for the serial

Like many American films of the time, The Brass Bullet was subject to cuts by city and state film censorship boards. For example, the Chicago Board of Censors required cuts:

- in Chapter 1, Reel 1, of a closeup of currency;
- in Chapter 2, Reel 2, two scenes of chloroforming a young woman and the shooting of a man through window;
- in Chapter 3, shooting man through window and the slugging of a young man;
- in Chapter 4, setting fire to cotton in lighthouse and last two scenes of the man sinking in quicksand;
- in Chapter 5, Reel 2, last scene of the man trying to force the cabin door;
- in Chapter 6, Reel 1, two scenes of slugging a policeman, Reel 2, all but last scene of the man pounding on the bride's door before she admits him, all scenes of the man forcibly entering the room and struggle scenes with the woman, the man looking through keyhole and breaking down door, and the three intertitles "Open that door. I have a right to come in", "My wife shall obey me", and "Oh, please don't touch me";
- in Chapter 7, Reel 1, all scenes of the man struggling with the young woman on bed, all scenes of the man in a woman's stateroom, aviator dropping bomb on the vessel, Reel 2, slugging man with a gun;
- in Chapter 10, Reel 1, slugging scene and, Reel 2, the intertitle "Send me her dead body and I will give you $5,000";
- in Chapter 11, Reel 1, shooting of man through a hole in floor, throwing man into the river, Reel 2, gagging and binding a young woman;
- in Chapter 12, the stealing of jewelry from a bag and the last three scenes of threatening a young woman with a gun;
- Chapter 13, Reel 1, the vision of the taxi driver, the young woman at bar with the man, all scenes where "mother" is shown, all scenes of young woman in spangled gown is shown except one where she recognizes Rosalind, Reel 2, all scenes of young woman in spangled gown is shown except one where she is with Rosalind, all scenes with the black maid except where she helps Rosalind with gown, the intertitle "I just took a gold mine to 'mother's'", all scenes in ballroom, and the last part of scene where a knife is descending slowly over a woman on a table;
- in Chapter 14, Reel 1, two scenes of man struggling with young woman on table, fourteen scenes of "mother" except where she is in the background, three views of groups of people on stairs during the young woman's song, old man making advances on young woman to include kissing her and offering her money, the entire incident of the black maid at the door, and the intertitle "So my unfortunate niece has fallen to this —?";
- in Chapter 16, Reel 2, all scenes of the man on a scaffold with a black cap on his head and noose around his neck;
- in Chapter 17, Reel 1, eleven scenes of man with shroud over head on scaffold, three scenes of throwing hand grenades from airplane, scene with shooting of guard;
- and, in Chapter 18, Reel 1, change the intertitle "A particular will prevented my marriage" etc. to "A particular will prevented the acknowledgement of our marriage by Mr. Joy until Rosiland was twenty-five years old" etc., shorten the choking scene, and the shooting of King.

== See also ==
- List of film serials
- List of film serials by studio
