= Robert A. Dillon =

American screenwriter

- Born: February 13, 1889; New York City
- Died: November 28, 1944 (aged 55); Los Angeles, California
- Occupations: Screenwriter; Film director
- Years active: 1914–1937

Robert A. Dillon (February 13, 1889 – November 28, 1944) was an American screenwriter and film director of the silent era. Dillon was born in New York City and was a brother of director John Francis Dillon. He wrote for more than 80 films between 1914 and 1937, and also directed eight films between 1916 and 1927, including The Santa Fe Trail, The Flame Fighter, Phantom Police, and The Lost City. Dillon died in Los Angeles, California in 1944.

== Selected filmography ==
- The Last of the Mohicans (1920)
- The Man Who Woke Up (1921)
- Beating the Game (1921)
- The Lamplighter (1921)
- Partners of Fate (1921)
- Winners of the West (1921)
- In the Days of Buffalo Bill (1922)
- The Radio King (1922)
- The Oregon Trail (1923)
- The Santa Fe Trail (1923)
- South of the Equator (1924)
- Three Keys (1925)
- The Prairie Pirate (1925)
- A Million Bid (1927)
- The Range Riders (1927)
- His Last Bullet (1928)
- The Voice from the Sky (1930)
- The Lost City (1935)
