= Earl Turner (film editor) =

American film editor

- Born: Earl Carver Turner; 27 March 1884; Nebraska, U.S.
- Died: 6 November 1971 (aged 87); Glendale, California, U.S.
- Occupations: film editor, writer, actor
- Known for: Movie serials
- Spouse: Lottie W. Turner

Earl Carver Turner (March 27, 1884 – November 6, 1971) was a film editor, specializing in action-adventure serials. Today's serial fans may be familiar with his work on The Phantom Empire with Gene Autry, The Secret of Treasure Island with Don Terry, Holt of the Secret Service with Jack Holt, Batman with Lewis Wilson, and Superman with Kirk Alyn.

== Early years ==
Earl Turner was born in Nebraska and was the son of James R. Turner, a telegraph operator, and Mary Elizabeth Stanfield. The young man grew up and worked on a farm in Indiana.

== Career ==
During World War I, Turner worked as a film editor for Triangle Film Corporation. For most of his career he was associated with Columbia Pictures, but he also worked for Mascot Pictures and its successor Republic Pictures, and independent producers Sam Katzman, Larry Darmour, Louis Weiss, A. W. Hackel, and J. D. Kendis.

== Serial specialist ==
In 1926 Earl Turner was hired by independent producer Ben Wilson to edit Wilson's adventure serials The Power God and Officer 444. He returned to the serial genre in 1933 for Mascot, where he edited eight consecutive chapter plays. In 1936 he joined the Weiss Bros. studio, where he edited five serials; Columbia released the last three.

In 1938 Columbia terminated its agreement with the Weiss Bros. and decided to make its own serials. Earl Turner joined Columbia's serial unit in 1940, editing or co-editing most of the studio's cliffhangers. He sometimes worked with fellow Columbia film editor Dwight Caldwell. Caldwell also received feature-film assignments at Columbia, but Earl Turner did not; he became a fixture in the serial unit and remained there through the very end of serial production. Turner edited Hollywood's final serial, Blazing the Overland Trail (1956).

== Later life ==
Turner worked very briefly in television, editing a single episode of Panic! in 1958. The 74-year-old editor then retired from the film industry. He died in Glendale, California in 1971, at the age of 87.
