= Ben F. Wilson =

American actor

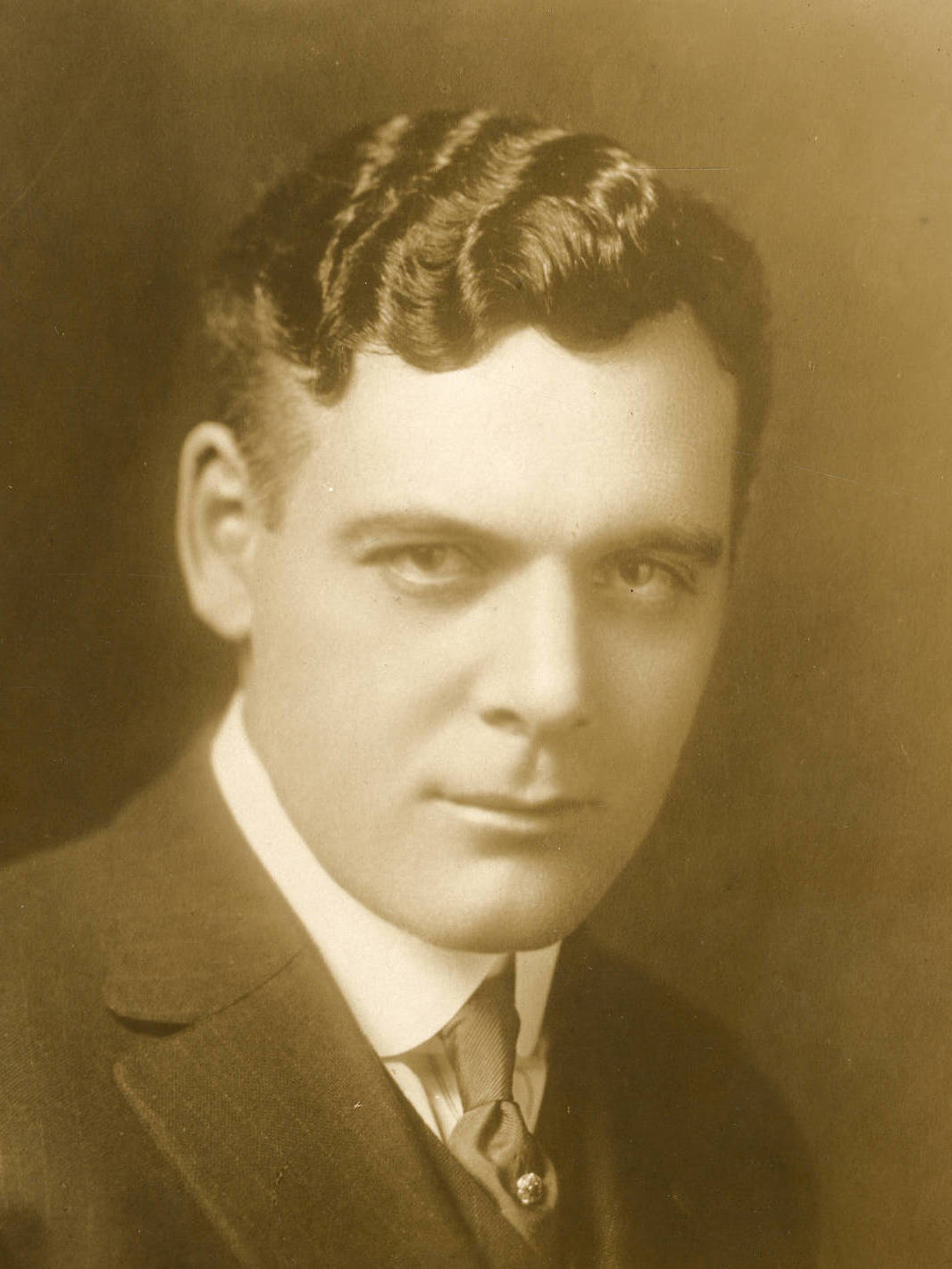
- Born: July 7, 1876; Corning, Iowa, US
- Died: August 25, 1930 (aged 54); Glendale, California, US
- Years active: 1911-1930

Ben F. Wilson (also credited as Benjamin Wilson; July 7, 1876 – August 25, 1930), was an American stage and film actor, director, producer and screenwriter of the silent era.

== Early years ==
He was born in Corning, Iowa in 1876. He "spent his school days" in Corning".

== Career ==
Wilson appeared in more than 210 films between 1911 and 1930. He also directed more than 130 films between 1912 and 1930. He starred as Inspector Cleek in a 1914 series of mystery shorts.

In the mid-1910s Wilson worked for Edison Studios, where he was regarded as one of that company's top performers. He portrayed five characters in the two-part The Awakening of a Man (1913).

== Death ==
Wilson died in Glendale, California in 1930 from heart disease.

== Selected filmography ==
- Silver Threads Among the Gold (1911)
- The Star Spangled Banner (1911)
- The Battle of Bunker Hill (1911)
- To Save Her Brother (1912)
- For the Cause of the South (1912)
- The Charge of the Light Brigade (1912)
- The Passing of J.B. Randall and Company (1912)
- In His Father's Steps (1912)
- The Old Monk's Tale (1913)
- The Mystery of the Dover Express (1913)
- The Vanishing Cracksman (1913)
- The Twelfth Juror (1913)
- Hulda of Holland (1913)
- Who Will Marry Mary? (1913)
- The Heritage of Hamilton Cleek (1914)

The Chronicles of Cleek series - (shorts)

- The Mystery of the Sealed Art Gallery (1914)
- The Mystery of the Glass Tubes (1914)
- The Mystery of the Octagonal Room (1914)
- The Mystery of the Lost Stradivarius (1914)
- The Mystery of the Fadeless Tints (1914)
- The Mystery of the Amsterdam Diamonds (1914)
- The Mystery of the Silver Snare (1914)
- The Mystery of the Laughing Death (1914)
- The Mystery of the Ladder of Light (1914)
- The Mystery of the Talking Wire (1914)
- The Mainspring (1916)
- The Cad (1915) (directed and acted)
- Idle Wives (1916)
- Even As You and I (1917)
- The Spindle of Life (1917)
- The Voice on the Wire (1917)
- The Mystery Ship (1917)
- The Brass Bullet (1918)
- The Trail of the Octopus (1919)
- The Blue Bonnet (1919)
- Castles in the Air (1919)
- The Screaming Shadow (1920)
- Thunderbolt Jack (1920)
- Cupid's Brand (1921)
- Dangerous Paths (1921)
- Devil Dog Dawson (1921)
- Cyclone Bliss (1921)
- Dead or Alive (1921)
- The Sheriff of Hope Eternal (1921)
- The Broken Spur (1921)
- Hills of Hate (1921)
- The Double O (1921)
- The Innocent Cheat (1921)
- Back to Yellow Jacket (1922)
- One Eighth Apache (1922)
- Peaceful Peters (1922)
- Chain Lightning (1922)
- The Love Trap (1923)
- The Satin Girl (1923)
- The Law Rustlers (1923)
- Mine to Keep (1923)
- Other Men's Daughters (1923)
- The Santa Fe Trail (1923)
- Condemned (1923)
- Notch Number One (1924)
- The Desert Hawk (1924)
- Two Fisted Justice (1924)
- Branded a Bandit (1924)
- The Mystery Box (1925)
- White Thunder (1925)
- Wild Horse Canyon (1925)
- A Two-Fisted Sheriff (1925)
- Scar Hanan (1925)
- The Human Tornado (1925)
- A Daughter of the Sioux (1925)
- Vic Dyson Pays (1925)
- Romance and Rustlers (1925)
- Tonio, Son of the Sierras (1925)
- The Fugitive (1925)
- Where Romance Rides (1925)
- The Riding Comet (1925)
- Tentacles of the North (1926)
- The Baited Trap (1926)
- The Wolf Hunters (1926)
- West of the Law (1926)
- Wolves of the Desert (1926)
- Fort Frayne (1926)
- Officer 444 (1926)
- Rainbow Riley (1926)
- The Range Riders (1927)
- Speeding Hoofs (1927)
- The Fighting Stallion (1927)
- Western Courage (1927)
- His Last Bullet (1928)
- Bye, Bye, Buddy (1929)
- The Saddle King (1929)
- The Voice from the Sky (1930)
- Shadow Ranch (1930)
