= Neva Gerber =

American actress (1894–1974)

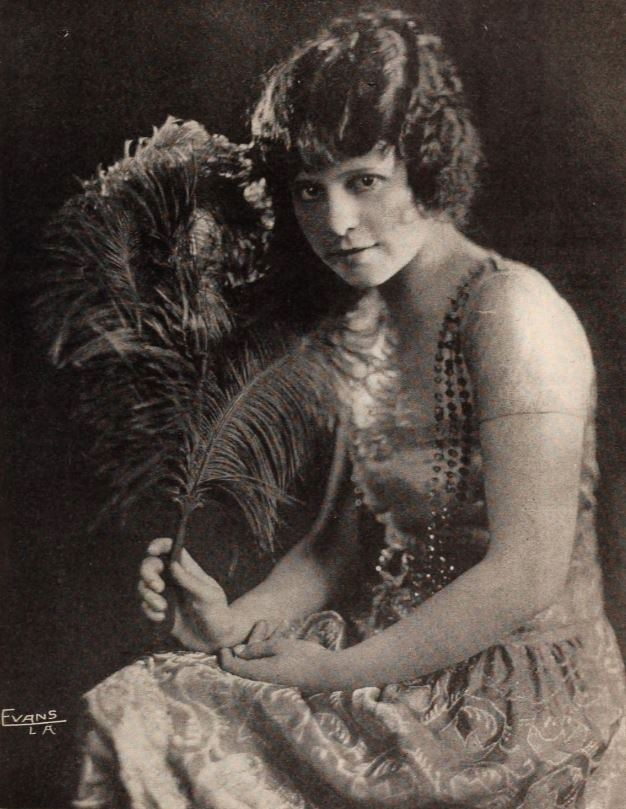
- Gerber in 1920
- Born: Genevieve Dolores Gerber; April 3, 1894; Argenta, Illinois, U.S.
- Died: January 2, 1974 (aged 79); Palm Springs, California, U.S.
- Resting place: Desert Memorial Park
- Other names: Jean Dolores; Genevieve Millett
- Occupation: Actress
- Years active: 1912–1930
- Spouses: Arthur Nelson Millett (m. 1913; div. 1920) Edward Dana Nolan (m. 1923; died 1926) David Booth (m. 1934, died) William Munchoff (m. 1958; died 1960)
- Partner: William Desmond Taylor (1914–1919)

Genevieve Dolores Gerber (April 3, 1894 – January 2, 1974) was an American silent film actress who appeared in more than 120 films between 1912 and 1930.

== Early life and career ==
She was born in Argenta, Illinois, to S. Nelson Gerber (1870–1902) and Juanetta Jean Pullman. Her parents separated when she was young and her mother moved her to Los Angeles, California. She was raised by nuns from the College of the Immaculate Heart. After the death of her father, Gerber's impoverished mother gave guardianship of her daughter to an attorney.

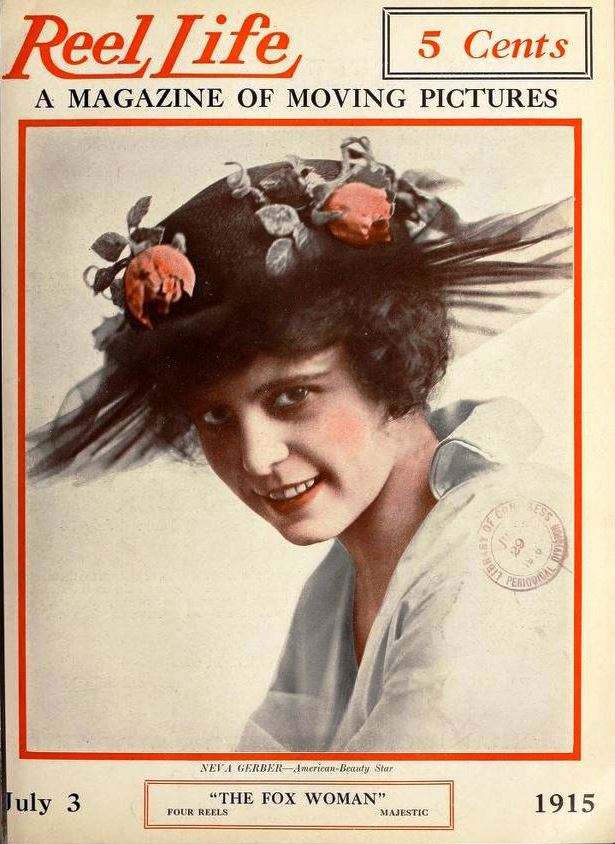
Gerber on cover of Reel Life, 1915

After her graduation from high school, Gerber became an actress and appeared in several one-reelers. Her film debut came in The Flower Girl's Romance (1912). Beginning in 1917, she starred in multiple serial films, and she is considered one of the top ten "serial queens" of the silent film period. She teamed with director and actor Ben F. Wilson in many of these productions, and starred in the first crude sound era serial, The Voice from the Sky, also directed by Wilson. However, her career stalled in 1930 after Wilson died from heart disease. Gerber retired from acting shortly thereafter.

== Personal life and death ==
Gerber's first marriage was to actor Arthur Nelson Millett on July 22, 1913. They separated the following year. In 1915, she became engaged to director William Desmond Taylor. Gerber and Taylor did not marry, because she was not yet divorced from Millett, and she and Taylor broke it off in 1919. (Taylor was subsequently murdered in 1922, a famous unsolved case). Gerber's divorce from Millett was eventually finalized in 1920. In 1923, Gerber married contractor Edward Dana Nolan, who died in 1926 of alcoholism. She went on to marry David Booth in 1934. After Booth's death, she married a fourth and final time, to contractor William Munchoff; he died in 1960.

On January 2, 1974, Gerber died of a cerebral thrombosis in Palm Springs, California. She was buried in a pauper's grave in Desert Memorial Park in Cathedral City, California.

== Selected filmography ==
Year	Title	Role	Notes
1912	The Flower Girl's Romance	Bessie Berkow	Short film
1912	The Water Rights War	Mabel	Short film
1913	The Redemption	Ogle - the Nursemaid	Short film
1914	Mrs. Peyton's Pearls	Eleanor Barton - the Daughter	Short film
1914	The Judge's Wife	Mrs. Livingston	
1915	The Madonna	Gertie	Short film
1915	Little Chrysanthemum	Little Chrysanthemum	Short film
1916	The Impersonation	Rhoda Lyons	
1916	The Mansard Mystery	Brina	Short film
1917	The Voice on the Wire	Polly Marion	Film serial
1917	The Mystery Ship	Betty Lee	Film series Lost film
1918	Hell Bent	Bess Thurston	Alternative title: The Three Bad Men
1918	Three Mounted Men	Lola Masters	Lost film Alternative title: Three Wounded Men
1919	Roped	Aileen	Lost film
1919	A Fight for Love	Kate McDougal	Lost film
1919	The Trail of the Octopus	Ruth Stanhope	Film serial
1920	The Screaming Shadow	Mary Landers	Film serial Lost film
1920	Bill's Wife		Short film Writer
1921	A Yankee Go Getter	Lucia Robilant/Vera Robilant	
1921	Dangerous Paths	Ruth Hammond	
1921	The Mysterious Pearl	Ariel/The Pearl	Film serial
1922	The Price of Youth	Adela Monmouth	
1922	Impulse	Julia Merrifield	
1923	In the West	Florence Jackson	
1923	The Santa Fe Trail		Film serial Lost film
1924	Sagebrush Gospel	Lucy Sanderson	
1924	Days of '49	Sierra Sutter	Film serial
1925	The Power God	Aileen Sturgess	Film serial
1925	Vic Dyson Pays	Neva	
1925	Tonio, Son of the Sierras	Evelyn Brower	
1925	A Daughter of the Sioux	Nanette	
1926	Officer 444	Gloria Grey	Film serial
1926	Fort Frayne	Helen Farrar	
1926	West of the Law	Alice Armstrong	
1927	The Range Riders	Betty Grannan	
1927	Hell Hounds of the Plains	Esther Lawson	
1928	The Old Code	Lola	
1928	The Lone Patrol		Credited as Jean Dolores
1929	The Saddle King	Felice Landreau	
1929	Thundering Thompson	Maria Valerian	
1930	The Voice From the Sky	Jean Lowell	Credited as Jean Dolores
1930	A Woman's Justice		Credited as Jean Dolores
