= Peaceful Peters =

1922 film

- Film poster
- Directed by: Louis King
- Written by: Daniel F. Whitcomb (scenario)
- Based on: "Peaceful" by Wilbur C. Tuttle
- Produced by: Ben F. Wilson
- Starring: William Fairbanks; Harry Lamont; W.L. Lynch; Evelyn Nelson
- Cinematography: Jack Fuqua
- Edited by: Earl Turner
- Production company: Ben Wilson Productions
- Distributed by: Arrow Film Corporation
- Release date: October 15, 1922
- Running time: 5 reels
- Country: United States
- Languages: Silent; English intertitles

Peaceful Peters is a 1922 American silent Western film directed by Louis King. The film was distributed by Arrow Film Corporation.

The film was adapted for the screen by Daniel F. Whitcomb based on a short story titled "Peaceful" by Wilbur C. Tuttle, which originally appeared in Short Stories in 1920. Peaceful Peters would be the first in a series of screen adaptations of Tuttle's stories starring William Fairbanks produced by Ben Wilson. Later films included Spawn of the Desert (1923) and The Law Rustlers (1923).

== Cast ==
- William Fairbanks as Peaceful Peters
- Harry Lamont as Jim Blalock
- W.L. Lynch as Perter Hunter
- Evelyn Nelson as Mary Langdon
- Wilbur McGaugh as 'Sad' Simpson
- Monte Montague as 'Cactus' Collins

== Preservation ==
Peaceful Peters is currently presumed lost. In February of 2021, the film was cited by the National Film Preservation Board on their Lost U.S. Silent Feature Films list.
