= Evelyn Nelson =

American actress (1899–1923)

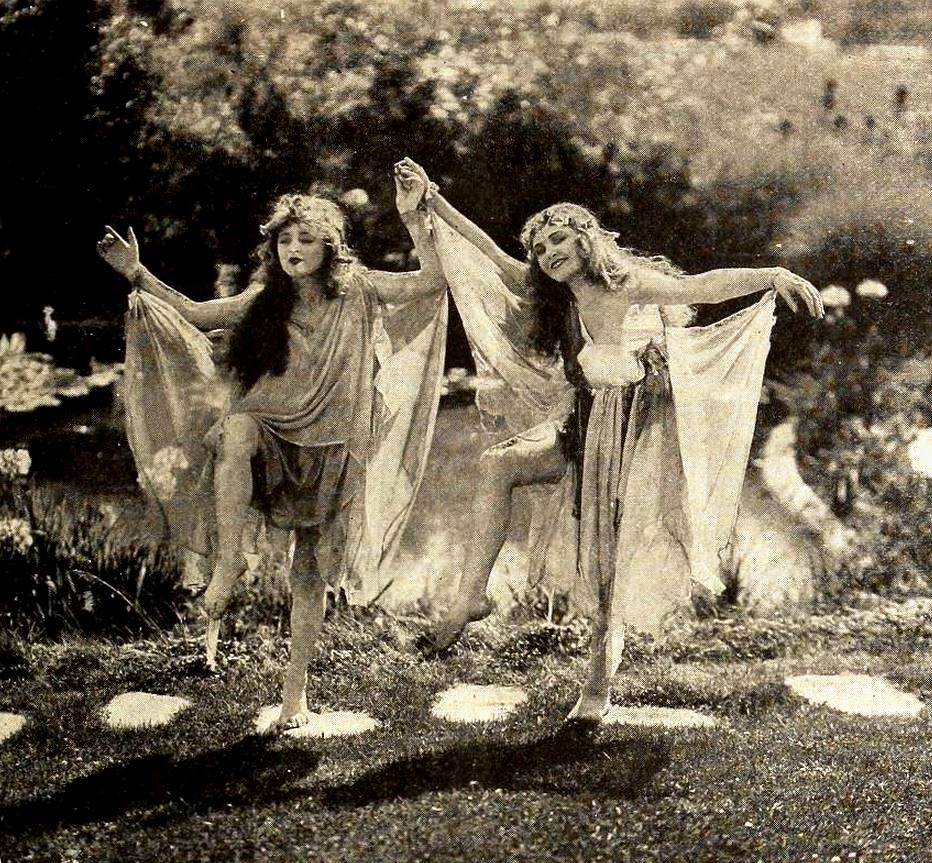
- Evelyn Nelson and Blanche White in a promotional still as members of the "Bull's Eye Follies" in 1919
- Born: November 13, 1899; Chloride, Arizona Territory, U.S.
- Died: June 13, 1923 (aged 23); Los Angeles, California, U.S.
- Occupation: Actress

Evelyn Nelson (November 13, 1899 – June 16, 1923) was an American silent film actress whose career encompassed 12 films over three years.

== Biography ==
Nelson was born in Chloride, Arizona, to William Henry and Georgia P. Nelson. Her sister, Pauline D. Nelson, was a year older.

Nelson's brief film career began with a 1920 comedy short called Springtime. The actress played the role of the daughter to The Commissioner, who was portrayed by Oliver Hardy. Her screen credits number only fifteen. Nelson was last seen in the western Desert Rider (1923) in the role of Carolyn Grey. She worked for Century, Christie, Fox, and Hal Roach studios. Nine of her films had her cast as leading lady in Westerns that starred Jack Hoxie.

Nelson fell in love with actor Wallace Reid, who was married, and he chose to remain with his wife rather than have a relationship with Nelson. In June 1923 the actress was found dead in a gas-filled room by her mother, Mrs. George P. Nelson. The two women resided at 6231 De Longpre Avenue in Los Angeles, California. The body was found after the mother returned from a visit to her son-in-law Charles L. King. The star of Hollywood comedies had not been seen for days and it was presumed she had been dead for some time.

Police said that two notes were found in her room. One stated that she intended to end her life because she was tired. The other said "I am just about gone and will soon be with my friend Wally." Reid had died after a struggle with narcotics dependency, just a few months before Evelyn. She was 23 years old. A police investigation into her death evidently did not contradict the apparent suicide.

== Partial filmography ==
- Springtime (1920)
- The Decorator (1920)
- The Trouble Hunter (1920)
- The Backyard (1920)
- His Jonah Day (1920)
- The Broken Spur (1921)
- The Double O (1921)
- Dead or Alive (1921)
- Hills of Hate (1921)
- Cyclone Bliss (1921)
- A Motion to Adjourn (1921)
- The Crow's Nest (1922)
- Peaceful Peters (1922)
- The Forbidden Trail (1923)
- Desert Rider (1923)
