= The Shoot 'Em Up Kid =

1926 film

- Directed by: Hoot Gibson
- Written by: William Berke
- Based on: a story by Carol Holloway
- Produced by: Carl Laemmle
- Starring: Fred Gilman; Dorothy Gulliver
- Distributed by: Universal Pictures
- Release date: September 11, 1926
- Running time: 20 minutes
- Country: United States
- Languages: Silent; English intertitles

The Shoot 'Em Up Kid is a 1926 American short silent Western film directed by Hoot Gibson and starring Fred Gilman and Dorothy Gulliver.

== Cast ==
- Fred Gilman as Terry Moore
- Dorothy Gulliver
- Ida Tenbrook
- Jim Corey
