= Roy Clements (director) =

American film director

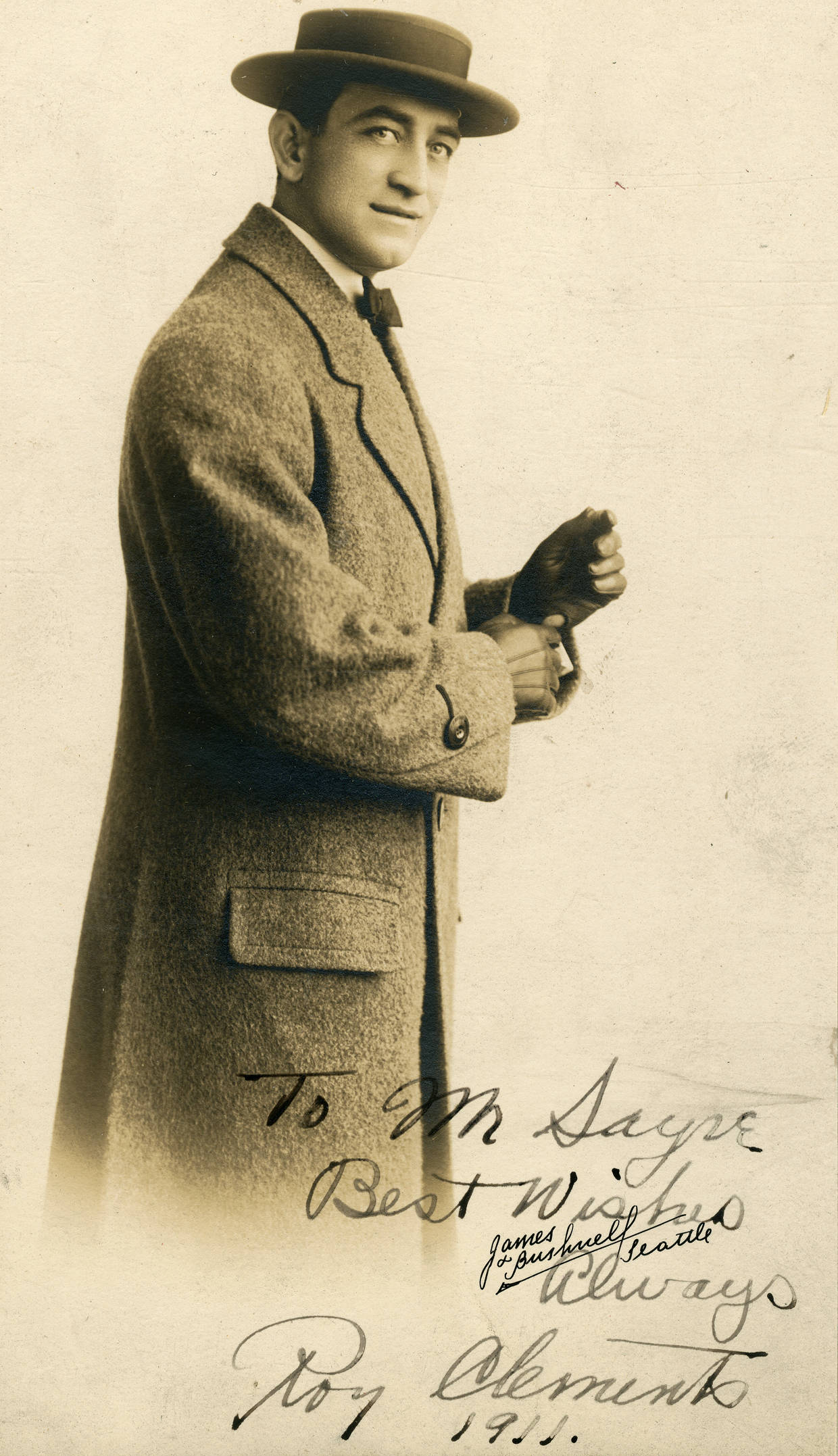
- Born: January 12, 1877; Sterling, Illinois
- Died: July 15, 1948 (aged 71); Los Angeles, California
- Occupations: Film director Screenwriter
- Years active: 1914-1942

Roy Clements (January 12, 1877 – July 15, 1948), was an American film director and screenwriter of the silent era. He directed more than 130 films between 1914 and 1927. He also wrote for 26 films between 1915 and 1942. He was born in Sterling, Illinois and died in Los Angeles, California.

== Selected filmography ==
- The Light of Western Stars (1918)
- The Reckoning Day (1918)
- When a Woman Strikes (1919)
- The Tiger's Coat (1920)
- Nobody's Fool (1921)
- A Motion to Adjourn (1921)
- The Double O (1921)
- Her Dangerous Path (1923)
- Nine and Three-Fifths Seconds (1925) (writer)
- Tongues of Scandal (1927)
