= The Forbidden Trail =

1923 film

- Directed by: Robert N. Bradbury
- Written by: Robert N. Bradbury (screenplay, titles)
- Produced by: Sunset Productions
- Starring: Jack Hoxie
- Cinematography: Jack Brown; Bert Longenecker
- Edited by: Robert N. Bradbury
- Distributed by: Aywon Film Corporation
- Release date: February 1, 1923
- Running time: 5 reels
- Country: United States
- Languages: Silent; English intertitles

The Forbidden Trail is a 1923 American silent Western film written and directed by Robert N. Bradbury and starring Jack Hoxie.

A print is preserved in the Library of Congress.

== Cast ==
- Jack Hoxie - Jack Merriwell/Colonel Jim Merriwell
- Evelyn Nelson - Isobel
- Frank Rice - Toby Jones
- William Berke - Rufe Trent (* as Bill Lester)
- Joseph McDermott - Red Hawk Dugan (* as Joe McDermott)
- Thomas G. Lingham - John Anthony Todd (* Tom Lingham)
- Steve Clemente - Uncle Mose (* Steve Clemento)
