= The Double O =

1921 film

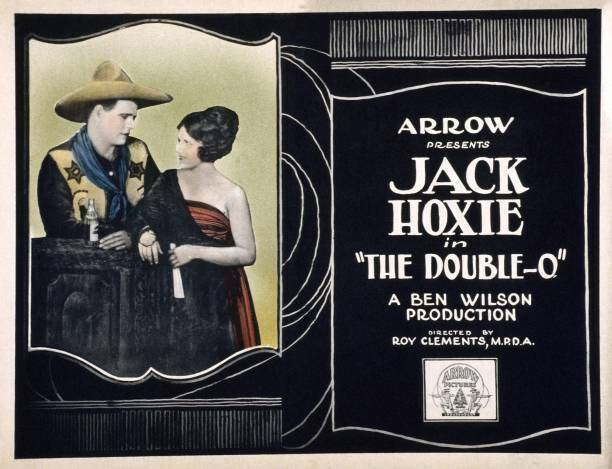
- Lobby card of the film
- Directed by: Roy Clements
- Written by: Roy Clements
- Produced by: Ben F. Wilson
- Starring: Jack Hoxie; Steve Clemente; Evelyn Nelson
- Cinematography: King D. Gray
- Production company: Ben Wilson Productions
- Distributed by: Arrow Film Corporation
- Release date: November 29, 1921
- Running time: 50 minutes
- Country: United States
- Languages: Silent; English intertitles

The Double O is a 1921 American silent Western film directed by Roy Clements and starring Jack Hoxie, Steve Clemente and Evelyn Nelson.

== Cast ==
- Jack Hoxie as Happy Hanes
- Steve Clemente as Cholo Pete
- William Berke as Mat Haley
- Ed La Niece as Jim
- Evelyn Nelson as Frances Powell
