= The Crow's Nest (film) =

1922 film

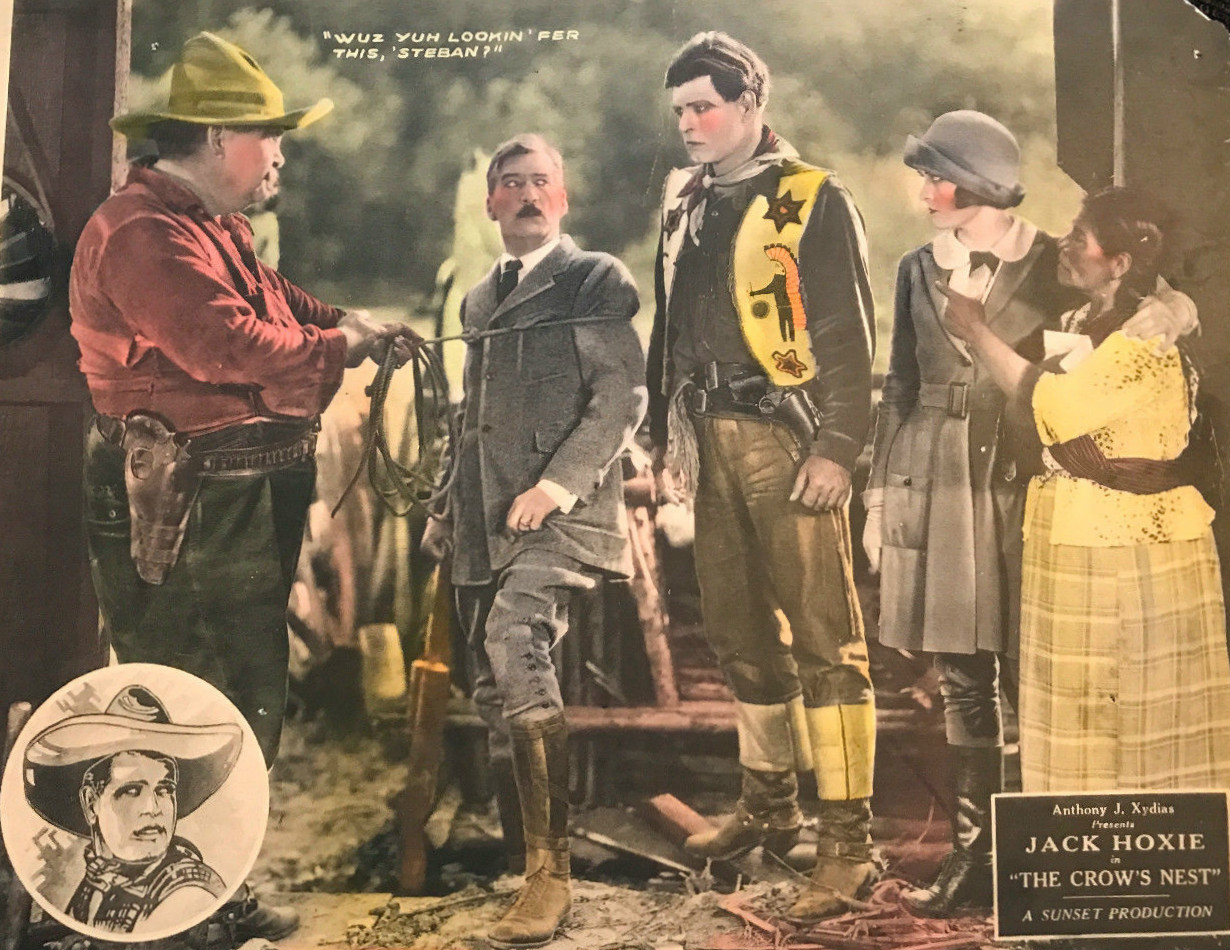
- Directed by: Paul Hurst
- Written by: William Berke
- Produced by: Anthony J. Xydias
- Starring: Jack Hoxie; Rudd Weatherwax; Evelyn Nelson
- Cinematography: William Nobles
- Production company: Sunset Productions
- Distributed by: Aywon Film Corporation
- Release date: September 15, 1922
- Running time: 50 minutes
- Country: United States
- Languages: Silent; English intertitles

The Crow's Nest is a 1922 American silent Western film directed by Paul Hurst and starring Jack Hoxie, Rudd Weatherwax and Evelyn Nelson.

== Cast ==
- Jack Hoxie as Esteban
- Rudd Weatherwax as Esteban, as a boy
- Evelyn Nelson as Patricia Benton
- Thomas G. Lingham as Beaugard
- William Berke as Pecos
- William Dyer as Timberline
- Mary Bruce as Margarita
- Bert Lindley as John Benton
- Augustina López as The Squaw

== Preservation ==
With no holdings located in archives, The Crow's Nest is considered a lost film.
