= Hashknife Hartley =

American radio Western series (1950–1951)

- Genre: Western
- Running time: 30 minutes
- Country of origin: United States
- Language(s): English
- Syndicates: Mutual
- Hosted by: W.C. Tuttle
- Announcer: Don McCall
- Created by: W.C. Tuttle
- Written by: Fred Luke; Burt Kennedy
- Directed by: Tom Hargis
- Produced by: Tom Hargis
- Original release: July 2, 1950 – December 30, 1951

Hashknife Hartley is an American old-time radio Western program. It was broadcast on the Mutual Broadcasting System from July 2, 1950, until December 30, 1951.

== Schedule ==
Hashknife Hartley began as a summer replacement series, filling the time slot of Juvenile Jury. Paired with Hopalong Cassidy in the following half-hour, the substitution gave Mutual a one-hour Western block on Sunday afternoons. In September 1950, the block was extended to 90 minutes when Bobby Benson and the B-Bar-B Riders was added in the half-hour before Hashknife Hartley.

== Format ==
The program featured the adventures of Hashknife Hartley and Sleepy Stevens, characters created by W.C. Tuttle, who served as narrator. Hartley was a western detective, and Stevens was his sidekick; the pair traveled around the old West, solving crimes in various towns.

== Hashknife ==
The word "hashknife" has two meanings in the context of western adventures.

A hashknife was a tool that camp cooks used to slice beef cubes in preparation for making corned beef hash. That implement also was the basis for a cattle brand that was designed to foil rustlers by making it difficult to superimpose a new brand over the existing brand. The Vandevert family, which developed the brand, became known as "the Hashknife Outfit", and in turn that group inspired the printed stories and the radio program.

== Personnel ==
Frank Martin in the title role and Barton Yarborough as Stevens had the only two regular roles in the series. Don McCall was the announcer. Tom Hargis was the producer and director. Writers Fred Luke and Burt Kennedy adapted Tuttle's stories into scripts. Harry Zimmerman conducted the orchestra.

== Critical response ==
A review in the trade publication Variety said that the program was "well-produced and well-acted" but that it had little to differentiate it from other radio Westerns. The review suggested that the show might gain more listeners in a different time slot.
