= The Reckoning Day =

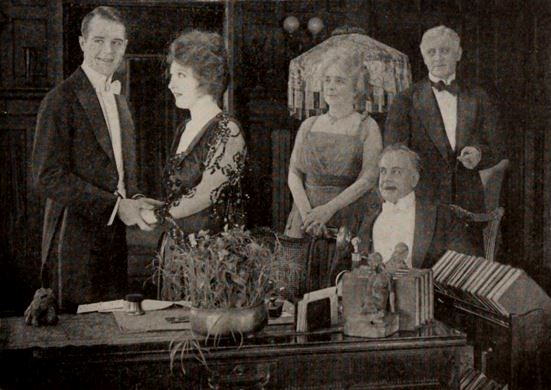
- Still from the film
- Directed by: Roy Clements
- Written by: Robert Hill
- Starring: Belle Bennett; Jack Richardson; J. Barney Sherry; Tom Buckingham; Elinor Fair
- Cinematography: R. E. Irish
- Production company: Triangle Film Corporation
- Distributed by: Triangle Distributing Corporation
- Release date: October 20, 1918
- Running time: 5 reels
- Country: United States
- Language: Silent (English intertitles)

The Reckoning Day is a 1918 silent drama film directed by Roy Clements. It was produced and distributed by Triangle Film Corporation.

== Plot ==
Jane Whiting, an employee of the district attorney's office, exceedingly clever in matters of law and thoroughly conversant with the ways of the underworld life of the city, is assigned by the chief to the task of bringing to justice a collection of Germans who operate a supposed charity organization for relief among the poor. The funds they thus secure are turned over to the Kaiser's government. While the attorney's office is well aware of all this, final proof is needed before the arrest and conviction of the traitors takes place.

Jane is engaged to Frank Wheeler, son of a Senator, a great admirer of Jane's. Frank, however, is something of a weakling, and he disregards his promise to Jane when he meets Lola Schram. Lois captivates Frank, and he, unaware of her connection with the German organization, is often seen in her company. Frederick Kube, the head of the fake charity organization, who also loves Lola, resents Frank's innocent interference in his affair. However, he continues his activities in collecting sums of money from the rich supposedly for charity work. These are duly remitted to the German Intelligence Department.

Lola at last confesses her connection with the crooked society to Frank. As a result she is shot and killed by another member in the very presence of the young man. Through the maneuvering of the Germans, Frank is arrested and charged with the crime. It is then, however, that Jane comes to the rescue. The trap she has set is sprung, the gang is captured, and Frank's name is cleared.

The young man then realizes his foolishness in allowing Lola to wind him around her finger, and he is only to glad that Jane is willing to forgive and forget his part in the affair.

== Cast ==
- Belle Bennett as Jane Whiting
- Jack Richardson as Frederick Kube
- J. Barney Sherry as Senator Wheeler
- Tom Buckingham as Frank Wheeler
- Elinor Fair as Lola Schram
- Louise Lester as Mrs. Schram
- Lee Phelps as Jimmy Ware
- Lucille Desmond as Tilly Ware
- Sidney De Grey as District attorney

== Reception ==
A contemporary review in Variety praised the cast and story, calling it "tense and exciting".
