= Cyclone Bliss =

1921 film

- Directed by: Francis Ford
- Produced by: Ben F. Wilson
- Starring: Jack Hoxie; Evelyn Nelson; Fred Kohler
- Cinematography: William Nobles
- Production company: Unity Photoplays
- Distributed by: Arrow Film Corporation
- Release date: January 1921
- Running time: 50 minutes
- Country: United States
- Languages: Silent; English intertitles

Cyclone Bliss is a 1921 American silent Western film directed by Francis Ford and starring Jack Hoxie, Evelyn Nelson and Fred Kohler.

== Cast ==
- Jack Hoxie as Jack Bliss
- Frederick Moore as Bill Turner
- Evelyn Nelson as Helen Turner
- Fred Kohler as Jack Hall
- Steve Clemente as Pedro
- William Dyer as Slim
- James T. Kelley as Jimmie Donahue
