= Steve Clemente =

American actor

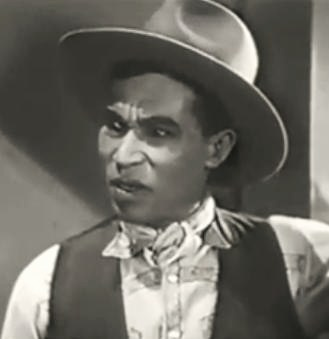
- Steve Clemente in The Murder in the Museum (1934)
- Born: Esteban Clemento Morro; November 22, 1885; Tonichi, Sonora, Mexico
- Died: May 7, 1950 (aged 64); Los Angeles, California, U.S.
- Other name: Steve Clemento
- Years active: 1914-1942

Steve Clemente (born Esteban Clemento Morro November 22, 1885 – May 7, 1950) was a Mexican-American actor known for his many villainous roles. He began acting in his teens, signing up for his first movie, The Secret Man, in 1917. His later roles were usually bit parts.

In 1922, he came to Hollywood to put on a knife demonstration for a disbelieving director. He was trusted to throw knives in movies that had to land an inch or two away from a celebrity. He always got right on target, and developed a good reputation for stunts. He was a known scene stealer and was famous for his villainous snarl. He later appeared in movies including The Most Dangerous Game (1932), playing Tartar, the second henchman of Count Zarrof and played the Witch doctor in King Kong (1933) and its sequel Son of Kong (1933).

After his last movie, Perils of Nyoka (1942), he retired from the acting scene. On May 7, 1950, he died from a cerebral hemorrhage.

== Filmography ==
=== Actor ===
- The Secret Man (1917) .... Pedro, the Foreman (as Steve Clement)
- The Law of Nature (1917 film) (1917) (as Stebeno Clements)
- The Scarlet Drop (1918) .... Buck (as Steve Clemento)
- Hell Bent (1918) .... Undetermined Role
- Lightning Bryce (1919) .... Zambleau
- The Arizona Cat Claw (1919) .... Zappatti (as Steve Clemento)
- The Girl Who Dared (1920) .... Ramez (as Steve Clemento)
- Thunderbolt Jack (1920) .... Manuel Garcia (as Steve Clemento)
- Cyclone Bliss (1921) .... Pedro (as Steve Clemento)
- Outlawed (1921) .... Frank Kayner (as Steve Clemento)
- Sure Fire (1921) .... Gomez (as Steve Clements)
- The Double O (1921) .... Cholo Pete (as Steve Clemento)
- Two-Fisted Jefferson (1922) (as Steve Clements)
- The Forbidden Trail (1923) .... Uncle Mose (as Steve Clemento)
- Crashin' Through (1924) .... Pedro (as Steve Clements)
- Fast and Fearless (1924) .... Gonzales (as Steve Clemento)
- Trigger Fingers (1924) .... Mexican Henchman (uncredited)
- The Rainbow Trail (1925) .... Nas Ta Bega
- Riding Romance (1925) .... Morgan Henchman (as Steve Clements)
- Chip of the Flying U (1926) .... Indian (as Steve Clemento)
- The Combat (1926) .... Halfbreed (as Steve Clemento)
- Davy Crockett at the Fall of the Alamo (1926) .... Mose (as Steve Clemento)
- The Temptress (1926) .... Salvadore (uncredited)
- The Sideshow (1928) .... Knife thrower (as Steve Clemento)
- The Rescue (1929) .... Islander (uncredited)
- Wings of Adventure (1930) .... Bandit (uncredited)
- Lariats and Sixshooters (1931) .... Saloon Mexican (uncredited)
- The Lightning Warrior (1931) .... Henchman (uncredited)
- Forty-Five Calibre Echo (1932) .... Mexican in saloon (uncredited)
- Riders of the Desert (1932) .... Henchman Lobos (uncredited)
- Mystery Ranch (1932) .... Henchman Steve (uncredited)
- Guns for Hire (1932) .... 'Flash' Gomez
- The Most Dangerous Game (1932) .... Tartar (as Steve Clemento)
- The Golden West (1932) .... Interrogated Indian (uncredited)
- Tex Takes a Holiday (1932) .... Knife-tossing Henchman
- Clancy of the Mounted (1933) .... Patouche - Renegade Indian
- King Kong (1933) .... Native Witch Doctor (as Steve Clemento)
- The Gallant Fool (1933) .... Circus Knife Thrower (uncredited)
- King of the Arena (1933) .... Henchman Pedro (uncredited)
- The Son of Kong (1933) .... Native Witch Doctor (uncredited)
- The Fighting Ranger (1934) .... Cougar's Mexican Henchman (uncredited)
- Viva Villa! (1934) .... Member of Pascal's staff (uncredited)
- The Murder in the Museum (1934) .... Pedro Darro
- Range Riders (1934) .... Saloon Swamper (uncredited)
- Fighting Through (1934) .... Steve - the Knife Thrower
- Kid Millions (1934) .... Desert rider (uncredited)
- Five Bad Men (1935) .... Rodriguez
- Under Two Flags (1936) .... Knife Thrower (uncredited)
- White Fang (1936) .... Indian (uncredited)
- The Vigilantes Are Coming (1936) .... Pedro, Burr's Spanish Henchman [Chs. 1-6]
- The Sunday Round-Up (1936) .... Knife Thrower
- Phantom of Santa Fe (1936) .... A Vaquero (uncredited)
- Land Beyond the Law (1937) .... Indian (uncredited)
- Hills of Old Wyoming (1937) .... Lone Eagle
- It Happened Out West (1937) .... Pedro
- Hawaiian Buckaroo (1938) .... Henchman (uncredited)
- The Cowboy and the Lady (1938) .... Knife Thrower (uncredited)
- Arrest Bulldog Drummond (1938) .... Native Buying Rifle (uncredited)
- Stagecoach (1939) .... Spanish-speaking Hired Hand (uncredited)
- Mad Youth (1940) .... Knife-Thrower in Club Act (uncredited)
- Adventures of Captain Marvel (1941) .... Native 5 (uncredited)
- Sing Your Worries Away (1942) .... Knife Thrower (uncredited)
- Perils of Nyoka (1942) .... Tuareg (uncredited)
- Hangmen Also Die! (1943) .... Knife Thrower (uncredited)
- Murder on the Waterfront (1943) .... 'The Great Rajah' throwing knives (final film role)

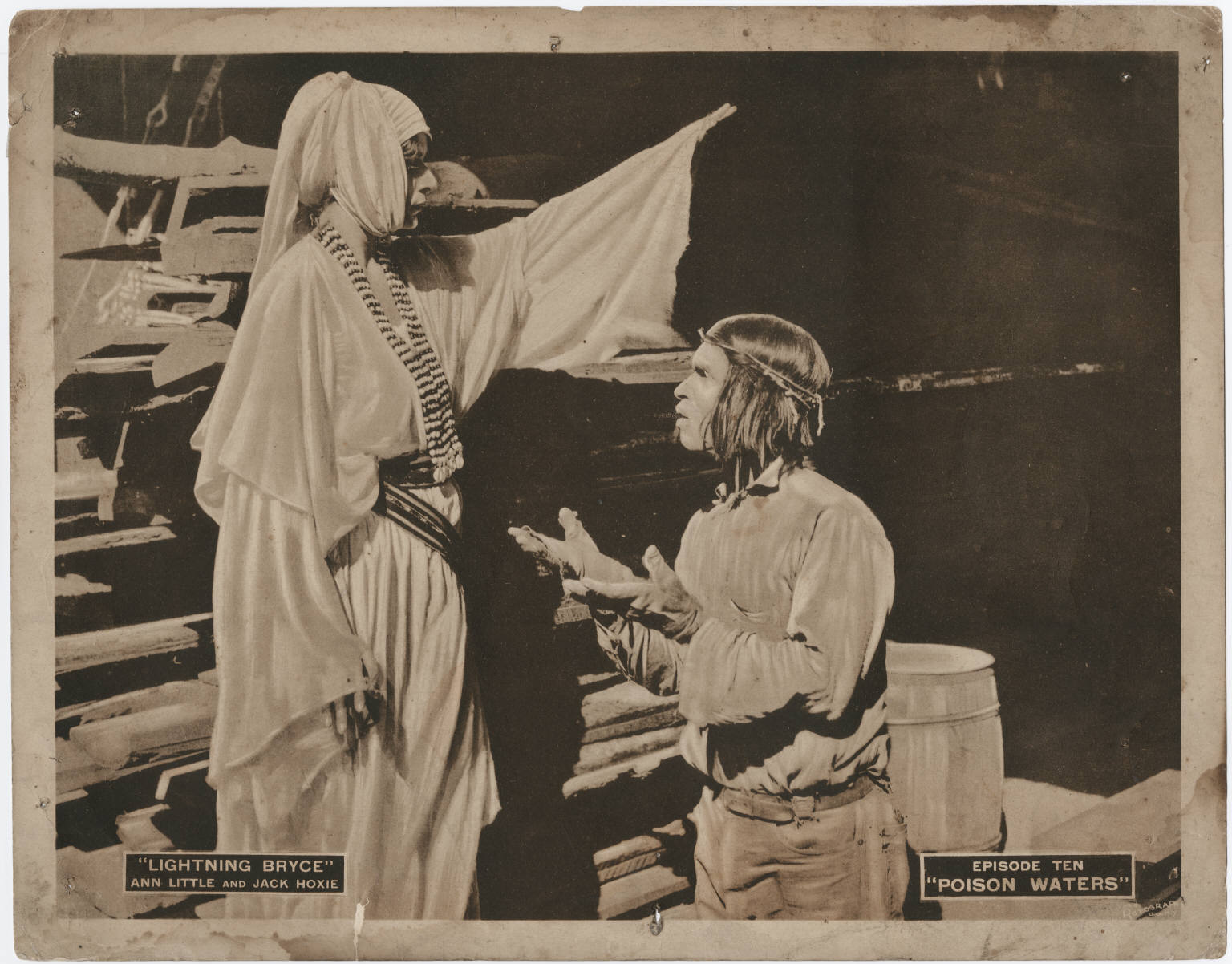
From serial Lightning Bryce (1919) Jill Woodward and Steve Clemente

=== Miscellaneous Crew ===
- Under Two Flags (1936) .... knife thrower (uncredited)
- Valley of the Sun (1942) .... knife thrower (uncredited)
- Rookies in Burma (1943) .... knife thrower
- Murder on the Waterfront (1943) .... knife thrower (uncredited)

=== Stuntman ===
- The Big Trail (1930) (uncredited)
