= Augustina López =

Mexican actress

- Born: Augustina Romero; December 24, 1842; Sonora, Mexico
- Died: June 13, 1932 (aged 89); San Benito, California, USA
- Occupation: Actress

Augustina López (born Augustina Romero) was a Mexican actress of Indigenous ancestry who appeared in a string of Hollywood films later in life. She reportedly broke into the industry through an association with actress Delores Del Rio.

== Selected filmography ==
- Thunder Below (1932)
- The Wolf Song (1929)
- Tide of Empire (1929)
- Redskin (1929)
- The Gay Defender (1927)
- El indio Yaqui (1927)
- The Night of Love (1927)
- The Were-Tiger (1925)
- The Crow's Nest (1922)
- A Sailor-Made Man (1921)
- Lightning Bryce (1919)
