= Cupid's Brand =

1921 film

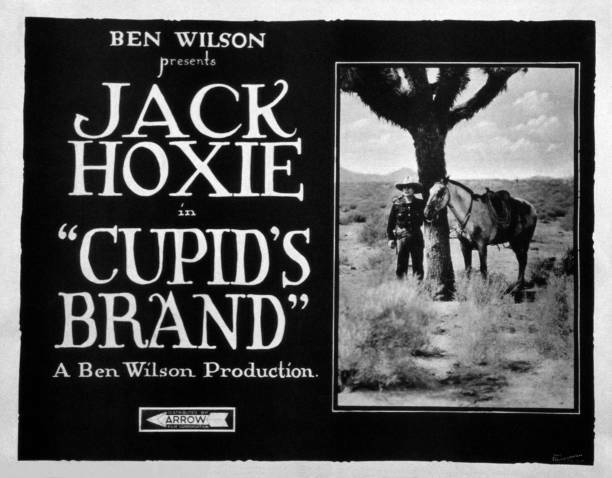
- Directed by: Rowland V. Lee
- Produced by: Ben F. Wilson
- Starring: Jack Hoxie; Wilbur McGaugh; Mignon Anderson
- Production companies: Ben Wilson Productions; Unity Photoplays
- Distributed by: Arrow Film Corporation
- Release date: April 1921
- Running time: 60 minutes
- Country: United States
- Languages: Silent; English intertitles

Cupid's Brand is a 1921 American silent Western film directed by Rowland V. Lee and starring Jack Hoxie, Wilbur McGaugh and Mignon Anderson.

== Cast ==
- Jack Hoxie as Reese Wharton
- Wilbur McGaugh as 'Spike' Crowder
- Charles Force as 'Bull' Devlin
- Mignon Anderson as Neva Hedden
- William Dyer as Slade Crosby
- A.T. Van Sicklen as Steve Heden

== Preservation ==
With no holdings located in archives, Cupid's Brand is considered a lost film.
