= When a Woman Strikes =

1919 film

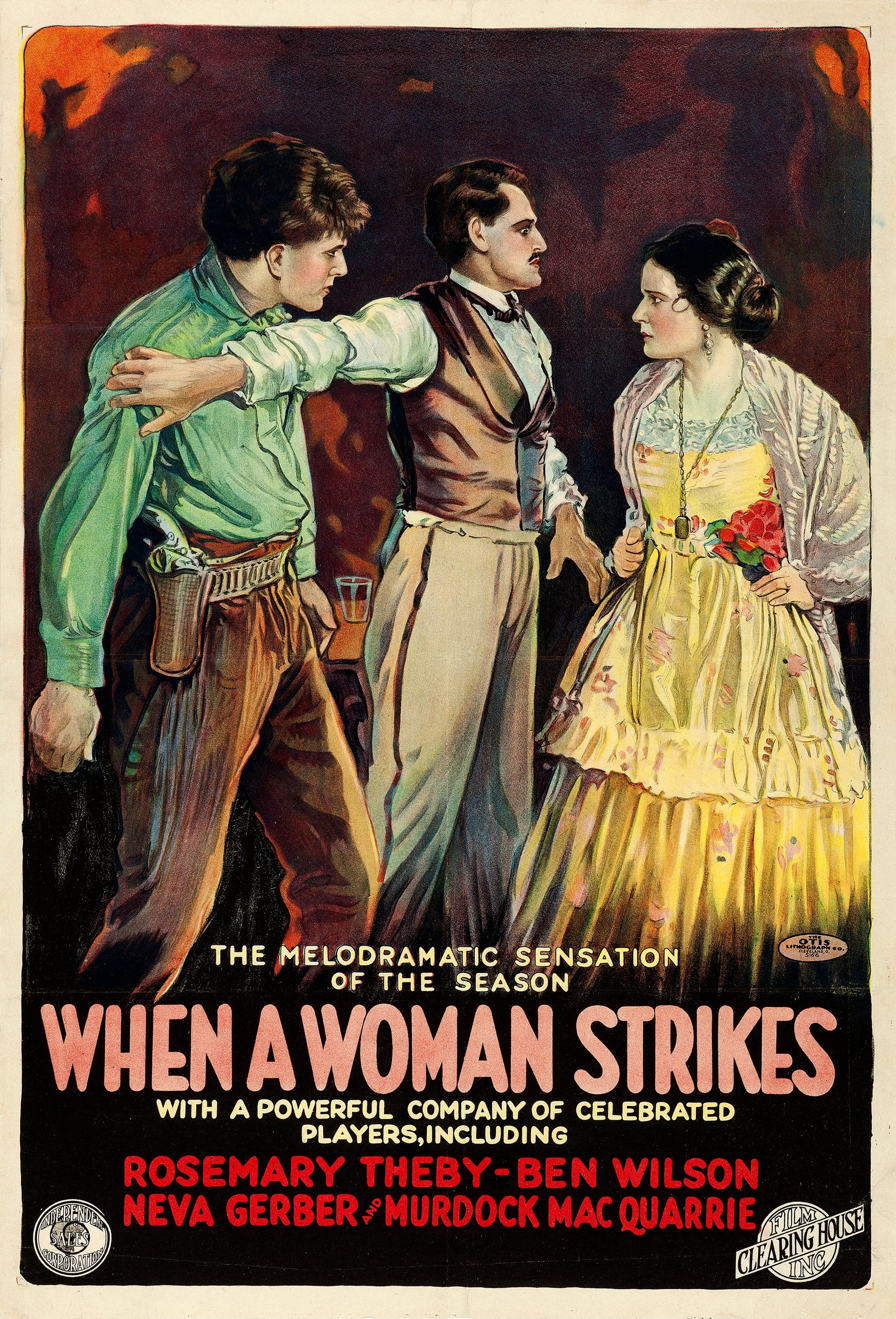
- Poster
- Directed by: Roy Clements
- Starring: Rosemary Theby; Ben Wilson
- Distributed by: ?States Rights
- Release date: April 1919
- Country: United States
- Languages: Silent; English intertitles

When a Woman Strikes is a 1919 silent film western drama directed by Roy Clements and starring Rosemary Theby and Ben F. Wilson. An independent production there is scarce info on this pictures. It is not known whether it survives or is lost.

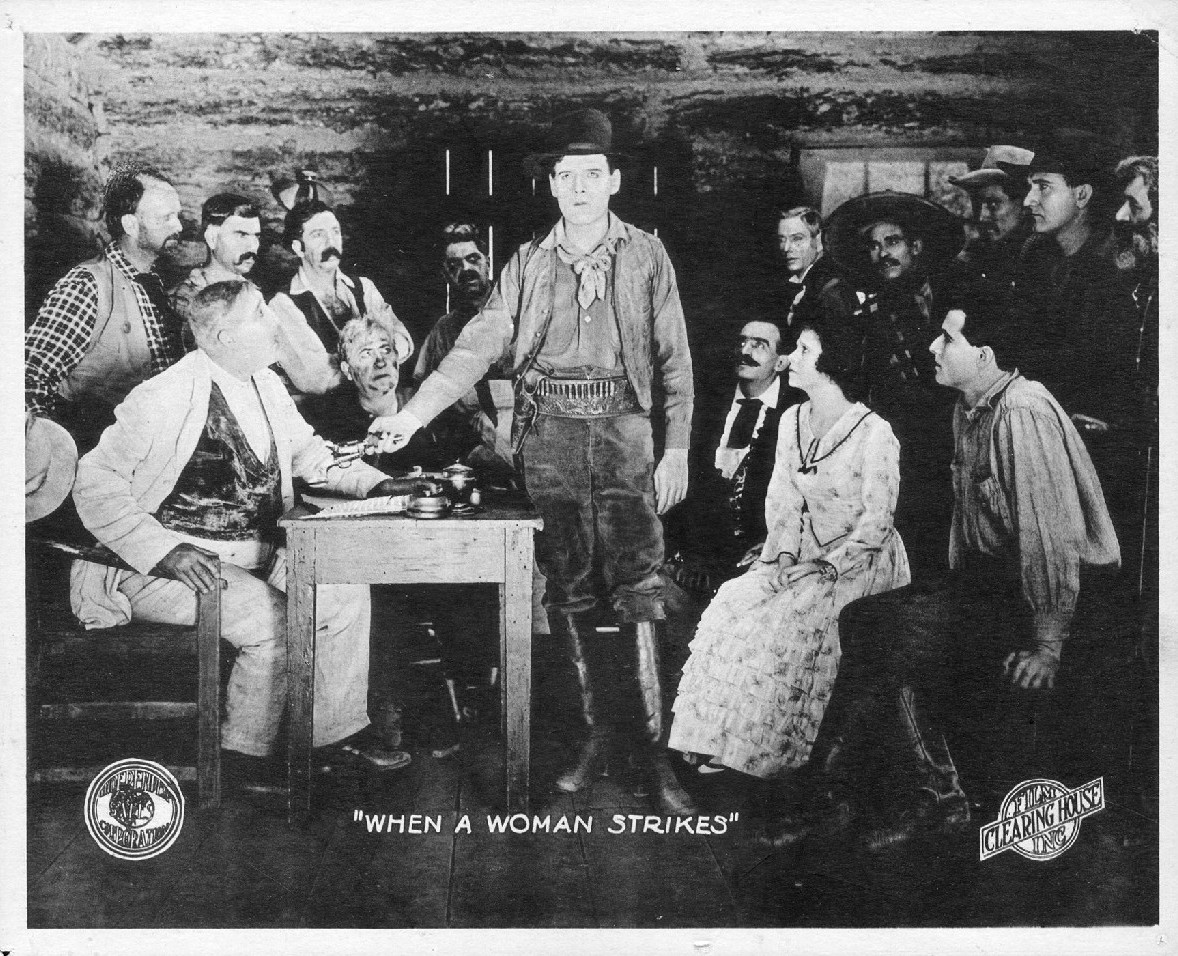
Production still

== Cast ==
- Rosemary Theby
- Ben F. Wilson
- Neva Gerber
- Murdock MacQuarrie
