= Lightning Bryce =

1919 film

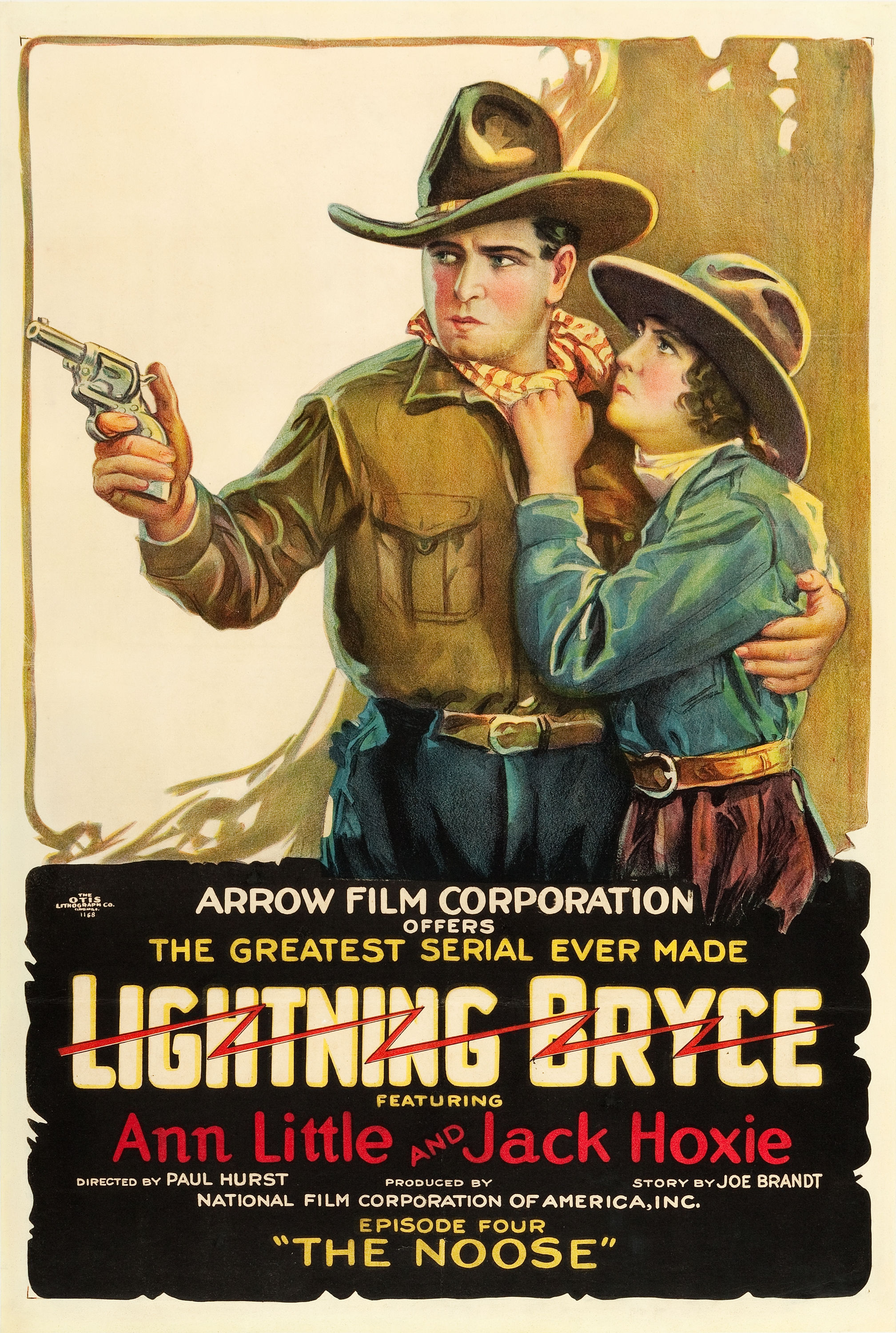
- Poster advertising episode four, "The Noose"
- Directed by: Paul Hurst
- Written by: Joe Brandt; Harvey Gates
- Starring: Ann Little; Jack Hoxie
- Production company: National Film Corporation of America
- Distributed by: Arrow Film Corporation
- Release dates: October 15, 1919 (to); January 21, 1920
- Running time: 320 minutes
- Country: United States
- Languages: Silent; English intertitles

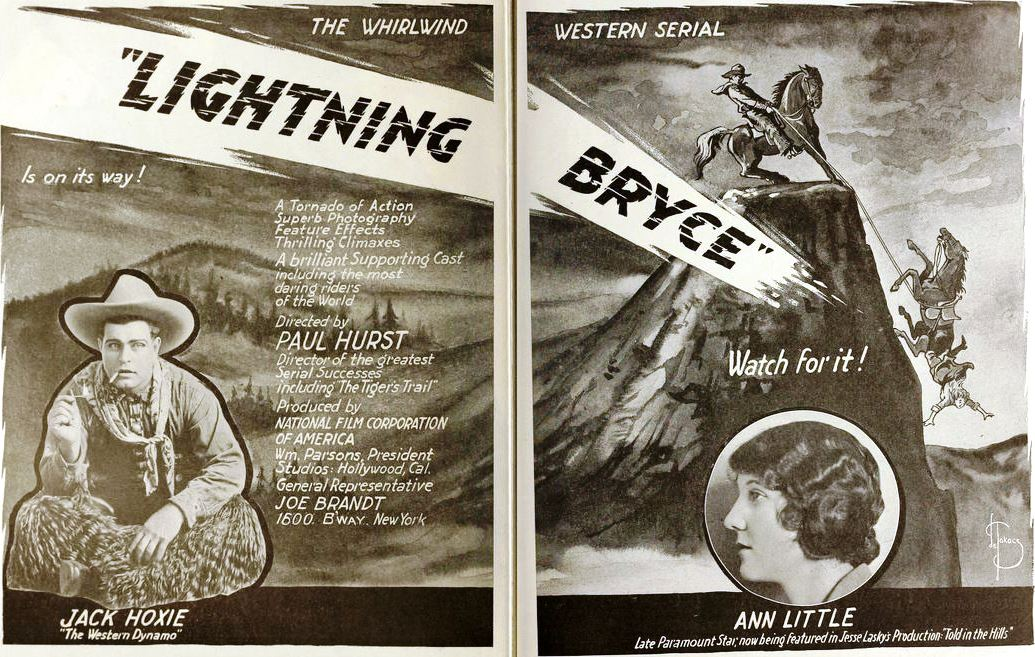
Advertisement from Motion Picture News

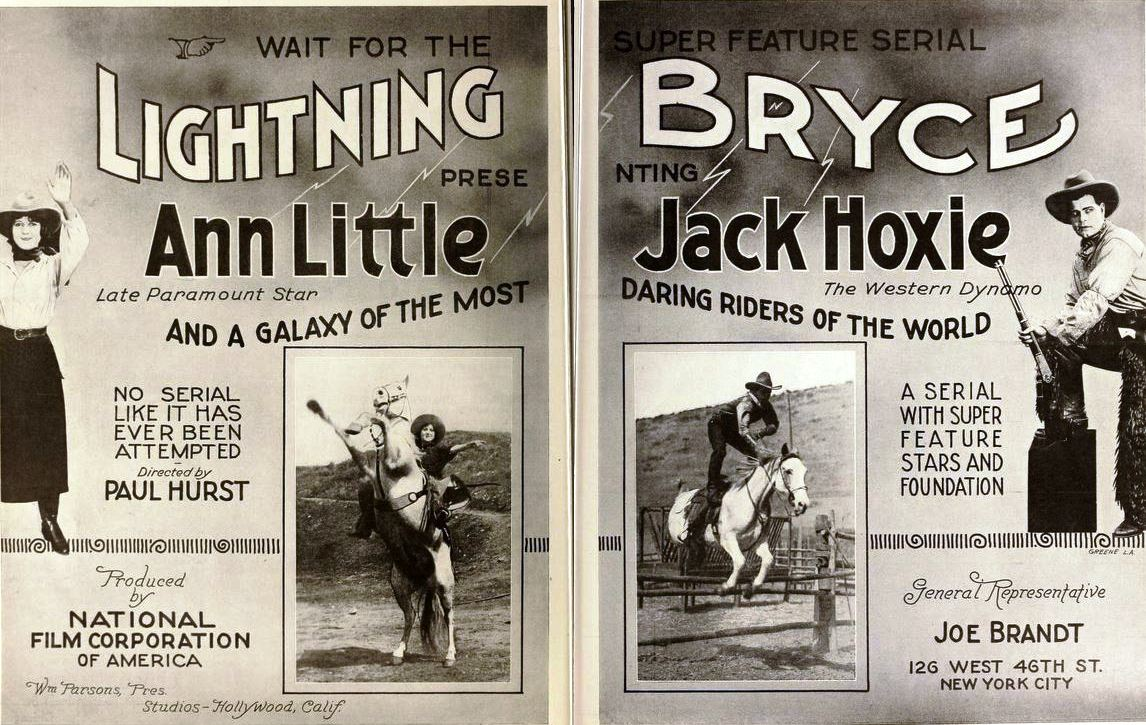
Advertisement from Motion Picture News

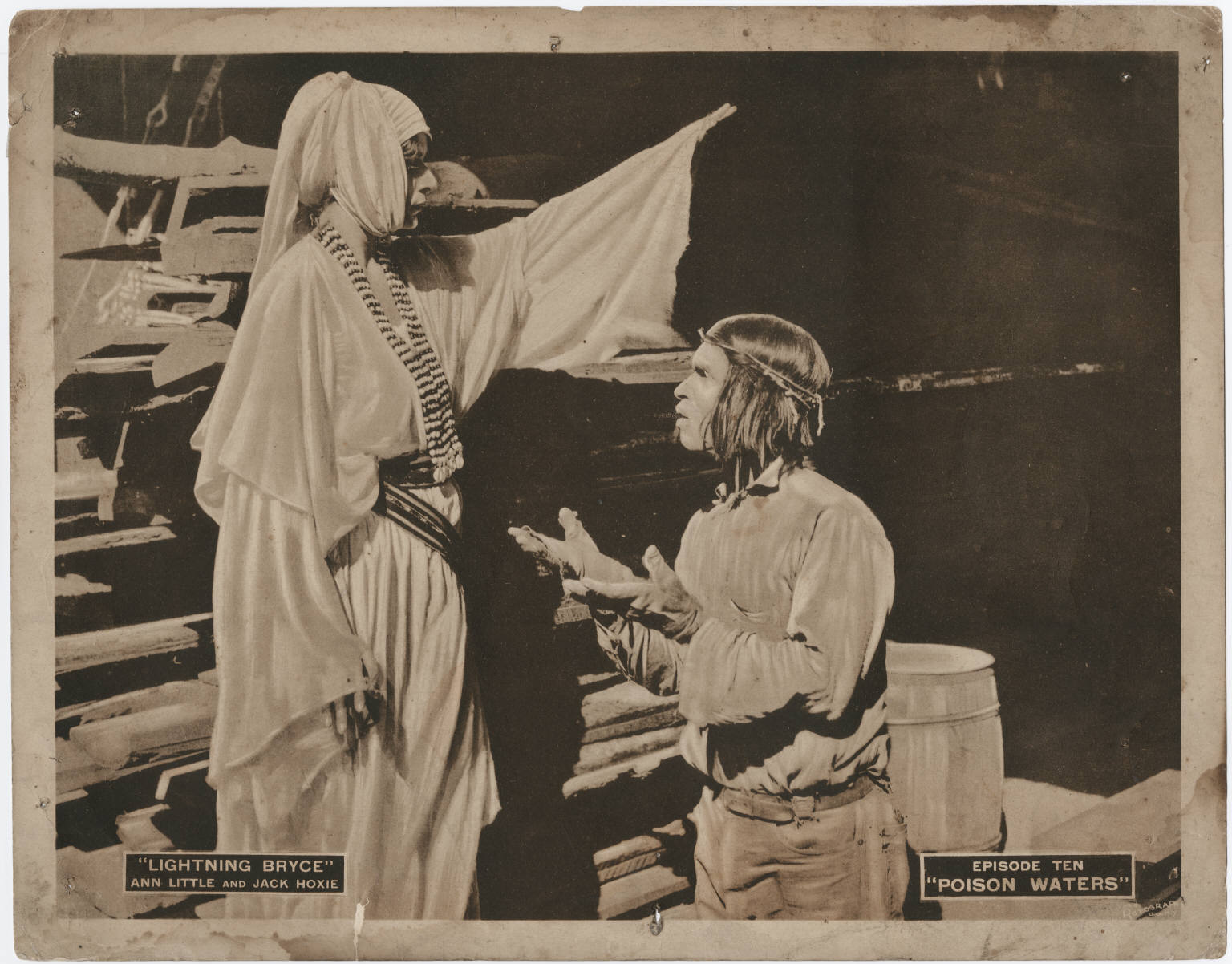
Lobby card - Episode Ten, "Poison Waters" (1919). Jill Woodward as "the Mystery Woman" and Steve Clemente as Zambleau

Lightning Bryce is a 1919-1920 American Western film serial directed by Paul Hurst and starring Ann Little and Jack Hoxie (his first starring role). In all, 15 episodes were produced; all episodes survive today and are in the public domain.

== Cast ==
- Ann Little as Kate Arnold
- Jack Hoxie as Sky "Lightning" Bryce
- Paul Hurst as Powder Solvang
- Jill Woodward as the Mystery Woman
- Steve Clemente as Zambleau
- Scout as Lightning's horse

=== Uncredited ===
- Yakima Canutt as the Deputy (episode 15)
- George Champion as a henchman
- Ben Corbett as a henchman
- Edna Holland as Daisy Bliss
- George Hunter as a henchman
- Noble Johnson as Dopey Sam's henchman/Arnold's butler
- Slim Lucas as a henchman
- Augustina López as Mother Lopez
- Walter Patterson as a henchman

== Episode list ==
1. "The Scarlet Moon" - October 15, 1919
2. "Wolf Nights" - October 22, 1919
3. "Perilous Trails" - October 29, 1919
4. "The Noose" - November 5, 1919
5. "The Dragon's Den" - November 12, 1919
6. "Robes of Destruction" - November 19, 1919
7. "Bared Fangs" - November 26, 1919
8. "The Yawning Abyss" - December 3, 1919
9. "The Voice of Conscience" - December 10, 1919
10. "Poison Waters" - December 17, 1919
11. "Walls of Flame" - December 24, 1919
12. "A Voice from the Dead" - December 31, 1919
13. "Battling Barriers" - January 7, 1920
14. "Smothering Tides" - January 14, 1920
15. "The End of the Trail" - January 21, 1920

== Reception ==
A reviewer for Motion Picture News noted the outdoor shots, writing, "a wide variety of scenery is used as a background, much of it being really beautiful.", and continued, "Suspense is nicely maintained at the close of each episode and there are plenty of stunts pulled which are noteworthy. In these Hoxie is not alone, being ably assisted by Miss Little." A critic for Exhibitors Herald wrote, "This serial has received more favorable comments than any serial that has been run for some time. Children will like it."
