= The Tiger's Coat =

1920 silent film

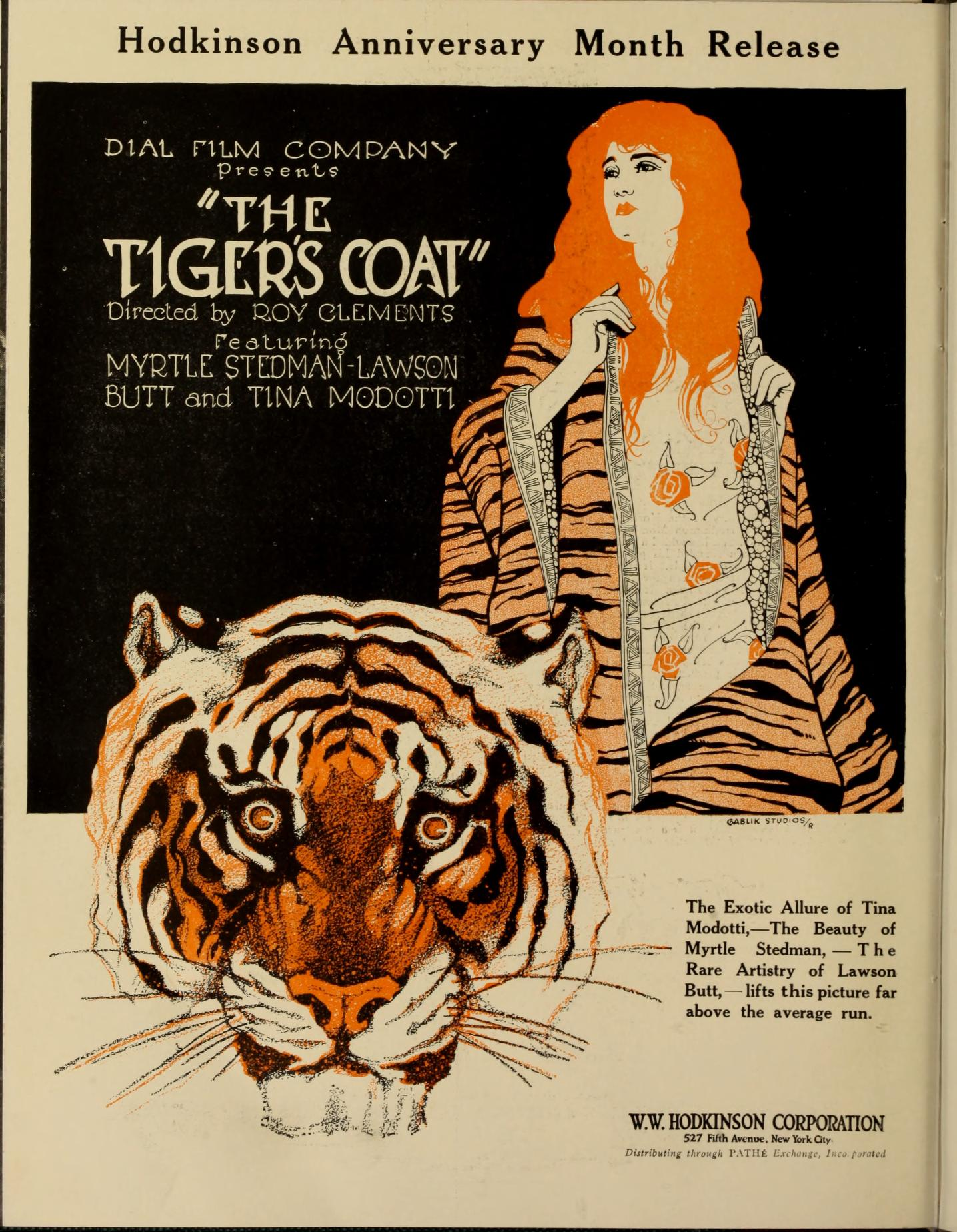
- Directed by: Roy Clements
- Written by: Elizabeth Dejeans (novel); Jack Cunningham
- Starring: Lawson Butt; Tina Modotti; Myrtle Stedman
- Cinematography: R.E. Irish
- Production company: Dial Film Company
- Distributed by: Hodkinson Pictures
- Release date: November 1920
- Running time: 50 minutes
- Country: United States
- Languages: Silent; English intertitles

The Tiger's Coat is a 1920 American silent drama film directed by Roy Clements and starring Lawson Butt, Tina Modotti and Myrtle Stedman.

== Cast ==
- Lawson Butt as Alexander MacAllistter
- Tina Modotti as Jean Ogilvie / Maria de la Guarda
- Myrtle Stedman as Mrs. Carl Mendall
- Miles McCarthy as Andrew Hyde
- Frank Weed as Frederick Bagsby
- J. Jiquel Lanoe as Carl Mendall
- Nola Luxford as Clare Bagsby

== Bibliography ==
- Connelly, Robert B. The Silents: Silent Feature Films, 1910-36, Volume 40, Issue 2. December Press, 1998.
