= Thunderbolt Jack =

1920 film

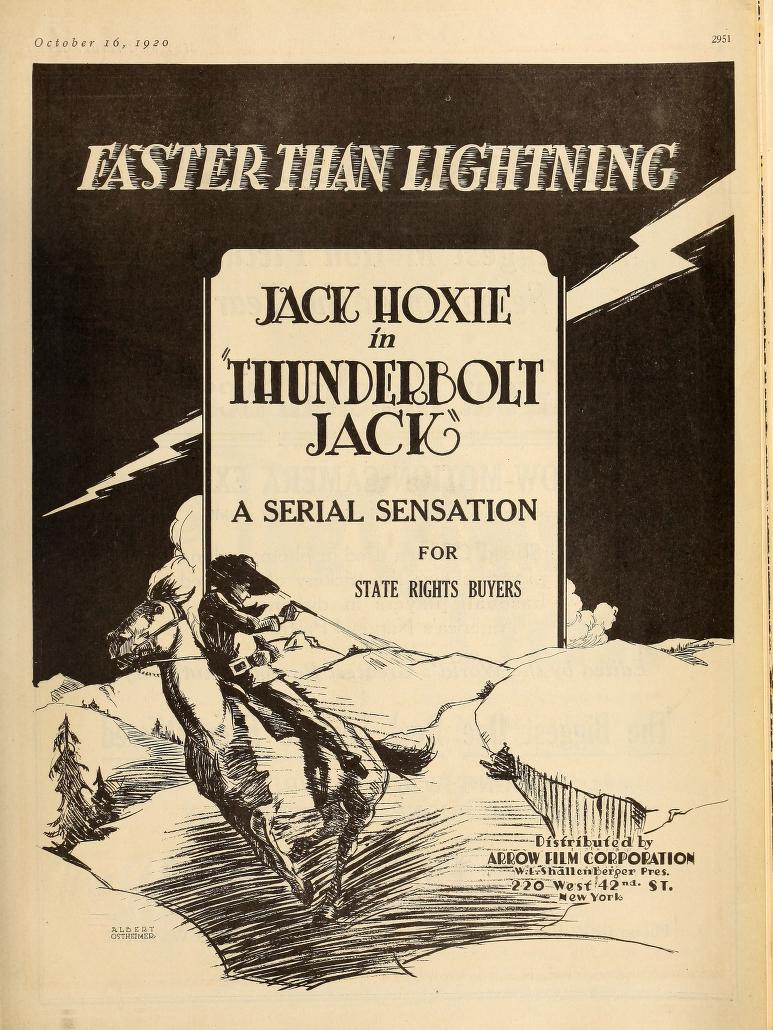
- 1920 Advertisement in Motion Picture News
- Directed by: Francis Ford; Murdock MacQuarrie
- Written by: Joe Brandt
- Produced by: Ben F. Wilson
- Starring: Jack Hoxie; Marin Sais
- Production company: Berwilla Film Corp.
- Distributed by: Arrow Film Corporation
- Release date: November 1, 1920
- Running time: 15 episodes
- Country: United States
- Languages: Silent; English intertitles

Thunderbolt Jack is a 1920 American silent Western film serial directed by Francis Ford and Murdock MacQuarrie, produced by Berwilla Film Corp., and released on the states-rights market by Arrow Film Corp. The serial is considered to be lost.

== Plot ==
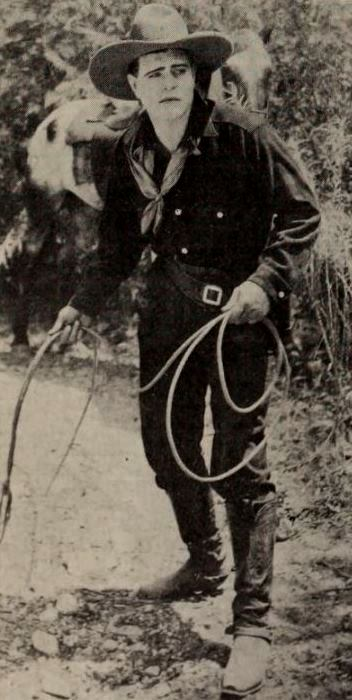
Hoxie in the film

As described in a film magazine, Jack's parents are tricked into a sale of their land through the conniving of Bull Flint (Frank), the big man of the small town near the home of the Holidays. Oil has been discovered on the land and Flint plots to obtain it. Flint dishonestly acquires the deed to the land and strikes oil on the property. Bess Morgan (Sais) gives the Holidays a home on her ranch. Jack Holliday (Jack Hoxie) comes home from college and rescues Bess from assault by Tom Flint, brother of Bull and a member of his gang. Fighting off repeated attempts by the gang to get him, Jack sees the two Flints imprisoned and the Holliday lands restored. Bess and Jack are rewarded with each other's love.

== Cast ==
- Jack Hoxie as Jack Holliday
- Marin Sais as Bess Morgan
- Christian J. Frank as 'Bull' Flint (credited as Chris Frank)
- Al Hoxie as Bud (credited as Alton Hoxie)
- Steve Clemente as Manuel Garcia (credited as Steve Clemento)

== See also ==
- List of film serials
- List of film serials by studio
- List of lost films
