= Honeymoon Flats =

1928 film

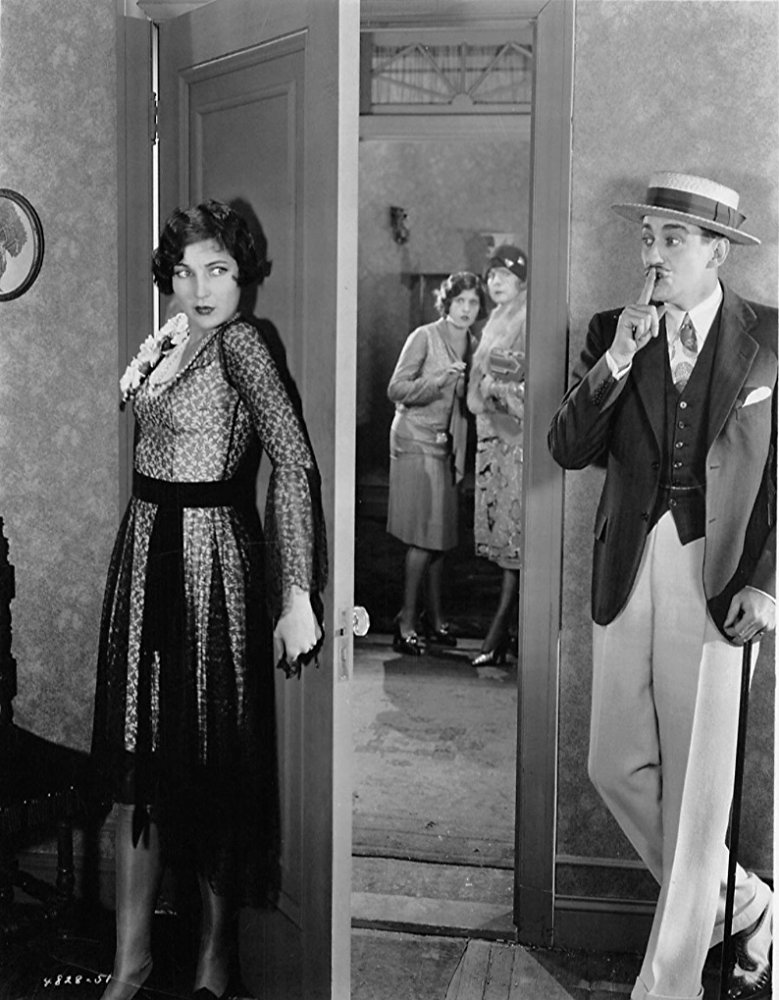
- Jane Winton and Ward Crane(his final film) in a scene. Dorothy Gulliver and Kathlyn Williams in background.
- Directed by: Millard Webb
- Written by: Earl Derr Biggers; Mort Blumenstock; Albert DeMond; Joseph F. Poland
- Starring: George J. Lewis; Dorothy Gulliver; Kathlyn Williams
- Cinematography: Ross Fisher
- Edited by: Frank Atkinson
- Production company: Universal Pictures
- Distributed by: Universal Pictures
- Release date: February 29, 1928
- Country: United States
- Languages: Silent; English intertitles

Honeymoon Flats is a 1928 American silent comedy film directed by Millard Webb and starring George J. Lewis, Dorothy Gulliver and Kathlyn Williams.

== Plot ==
Disappointed that her daughter has not married into money, a mother attempts to make her daughter fed-up with life in her new marital homes - a cheap housing development known as Honeymoon Flats.

== Cast ==
- George J. Lewis as Jim Clayton
- Dorothy Gulliver as Lila Garland
- Kathlyn Williams as Mrs. Garland
- Ward Crane as Anthony Weir
- Bryant Washburn as Tom Twitchell
- Phillips Smalley as Mr. Garland
- Jane Winton as Jane Twitchell
- Patricia Caron as Mrs. French
- Eddie Phillips as Mr. French
- Betty Jane Graham as Cupid

== Bibliography ==
- Munden, Kenneth White. The American Film Institute Catalog of Motion Pictures Produced in the United States, Part 1. University of California Press, 1997.
