= The Broken Spur =

1921 film

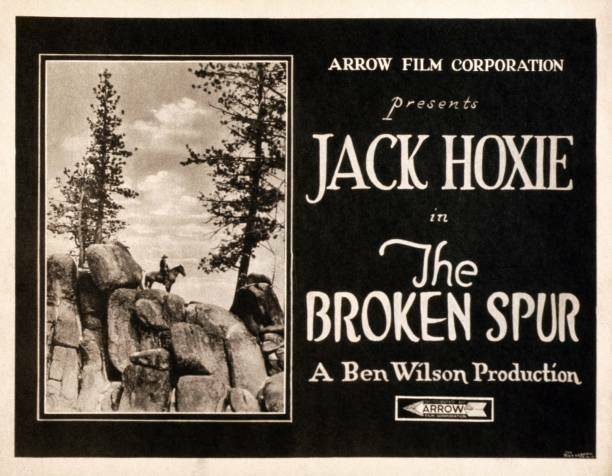
- Directed by: Ben F. Wilson
- Written by: J. Grubb Alexander
- Produced by: Ben F. Wilson
- Starring: Jack Hoxie; Evelyn Nelson; Marin Sais
- Production company: Ben Wilson Productions
- Distributed by: Arrow Film Corporation
- Release date: July 1921
- Running time: 50 minutes
- Country: United States
- Languages: Silent; English intertitles

The Broken Spur is a 1921 American silent Western film directed by Ben F. Wilson and starring Jack Hoxie, Evelyn Nelson and Marin Sais.

== Plot ==
An engineer attempts to construct a new railroad through the Canadian Northwest, facing opposition from a local bandit leader who fears the railroad will bring law and order to the area. Things are complicated by the fact that the two men are doppelgangers.

== Cast ==
- Jack Hoxie as 'Silent' Joe Dayton/Jacques Durand
- Evelyn Nelson as 'Angel' Lambert
- Jim Welch as Bill Lambert
- Wilbur McGaugh as Pierre LeBac
- Edward W. Borman as John Dexter
- Harry L. Rattenberry as Andy MacGregor
- Marin Sais as Ida Hunt

== Preservation ==
With no holdings located in archives, The Broken Spur is considered a lost film.

== Bibliography ==
- Langman, Larry. A Guide to Silent Westerns. Greenwood Publishing Group, 1992.
- Munden, Kenneth White. The American Film Institute Catalog of Motion Pictures Produced in the United States, Part 1. University of California Press, 1997.
