= Outlaw Justice =

1932 film

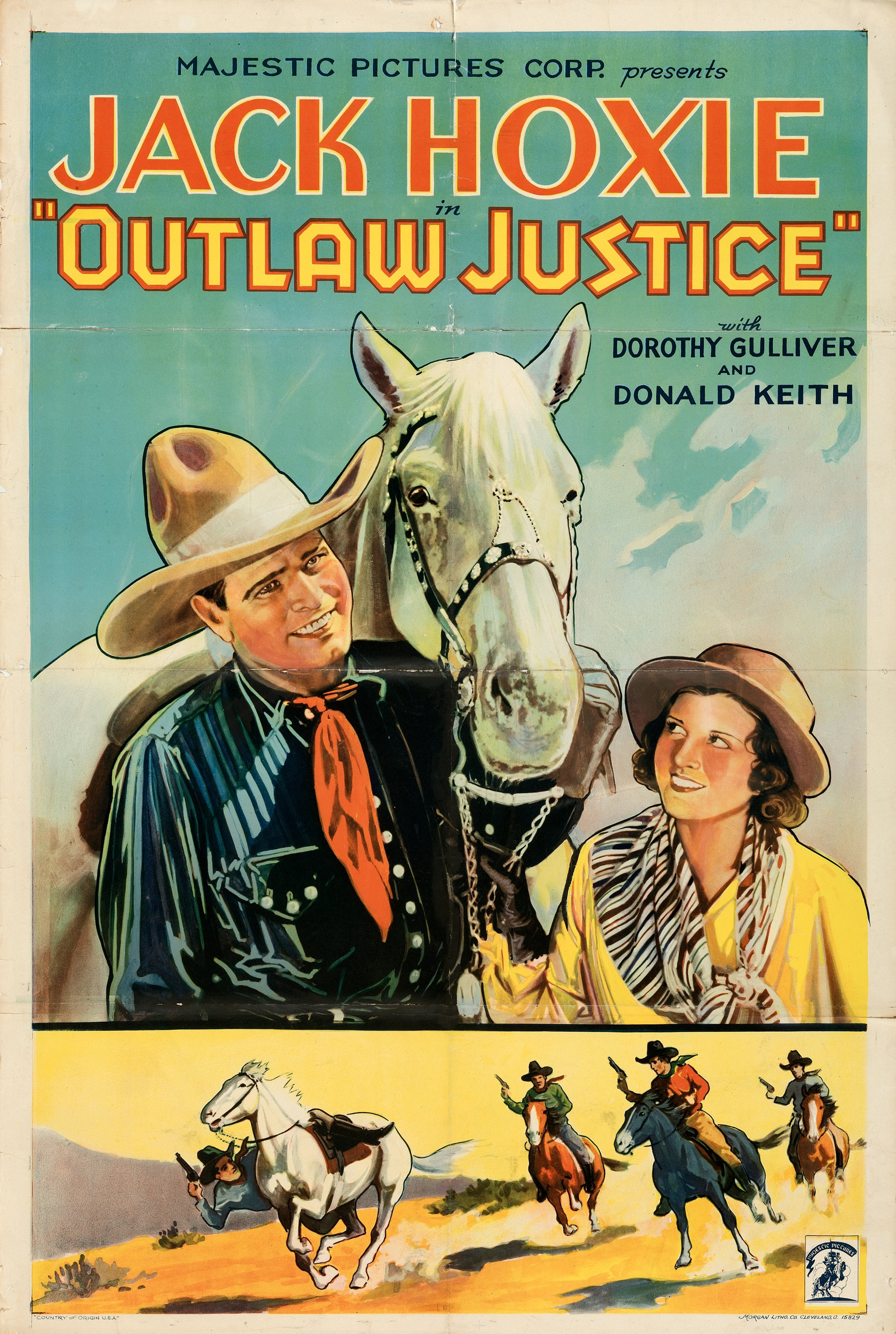
- Directed by: Armand Schaefer
- Written by: Scott Darling
- Produced by: Larry Darmour; Henry L. Goldstone
- Starring: Jack Hoxie; Dorothy Gulliver; Donald Keith
- Cinematography: William Nobles
- Edited by: Ethel Davey
- Production company: Larry Darmour Productions
- Distributed by: Majestic Pictures
- Release date: October 1, 1932
- Running time: 61 minutes
- Country: United States
- Language: English

Outlaw Justice is a 1932 American pre-Code western film directed by Armand Schaefer and starring Jack Hoxie, Dorothy Gulliver and Donald Keith. It was produced as a second feature for release by Majestic Pictures.

== Plot ==
Panamint Jack is on the run for the law, falsely accused of murdering a sheriff who is in fact still alive. He takes shelter at the Taggart ranch and discovers that June Taggart is being cheated out of her land.

== Cast ==
- Jack Hoxie as Panamint Jack
- Dorothy Gulliver as June Taggart
- Donald Keith as Bob Taggart
- Charles King as Volger
- Jack Trent as Faro Black
- Chris-Pin Martin as El Diablo
- Tom London as Henchman Hank
- Walter Shumway as Sheriff Tom Rankin
- Jack Rockwell as Sheriff Jake
- Pete Morrison as Henchman
- Slim Whitaker as Townsman
- Hank Bell as Henchman
- Horace B. Carpenter as Drunk
- Kermit Maynard as Man Who Ejects the Drunk
- Dynamite the Horse as Dynamite, Jack's horse

== Bibliography ==
- Rainey, Buck. Those Fabulous Serial Heroines: Their Lives and Films. Scarecrow Press, 1990.
