= Tide of Empire =

1929 film

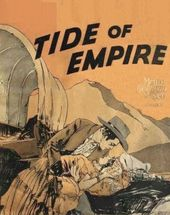
- Directed by: Allan Dwan
- Written by: Waldemar Young (scenario)
- Based on: Argonauts by Peter B. Kyne
- Starring: Renée Adorée; Tom Keene
- Cinematography: Merritt B. Gerstad
- Edited by: Blanche Sewell
- Music by: William Axt (uncredited)
- Production company: Cosmopolitan Productions
- Distributed by: Metro-Goldwyn-Mayer
- Release date: March 23, 1929
- Running time: 73 minutes
- Country: United States
- Languages: Sound (Synchronized); English intertitles

Tide of Empire is a 1929 American synchronized sound Western film directed by Allan Dwan and starring Renée Adorée and Tom Keene. While the film has no audible dialog, it was released with a synchronized musical score with sound effects using both the sound-on-disc and sound-on-film process.

On January 12, 2010, Tide of Empire was released on home video for the first time on DVD on Warner Archive Collection.

== Plot ==
Tide of Empire (1929)

== Cast ==
- Renée Adorée as Josephita Guerrero
- Tom Keene as Dermond D'Arcy (credited as George Duryea)
- Fred Kohler as Cannon
- George Fawcett as Don Jose
- William Collier Jr. as Romaldo
- James Bradbury Sr. as Jabez
- Harry Gribbon as O'Shea
- Paul Hurst as Poppy
- Rosita Delmar (uncredited)
- Richard Alexander as Gold Miner with Whip (uncredited)
- Irving Bacon as Townsman (uncredited)
- Fred Burns as Vigilante (uncredited)
- Bob Card as Fiddle Player (uncredited)
- Jim Corey as Raider (uncredited)
- Gino Corrado as Carlos Montalvo (uncredited)
- Pat Harmon as Raider (uncredited)
- Buster Keaton as Drunk Cowboy Thrown Out of Saloon (uncredited)
- Augustina López as Guerreros Servant (uncredited)
- Eric Mayne as Don Emilio (uncredited)
- Charles Stevens as Indian Servant (uncredited)

== Music ==
The film features a theme song entitled “Josephita” which was composed by Ray Klages (words) and Jesse Greer (music).

== Production ==
The film was originally slated to star Joan Crawford in the female lead, but the final filming had Renée Adorée instead of Crawford. It was one of the last MGM films without dialogue and performed badly at the box office. Buster Keaton, who was visiting the set, got cast in a cameo as a drunk getting thrown out of a saloon. It was actually a prank and a matter of self-casting, since director Allan Dwan was as surprised as everyone else to suddenly see Keaton “come flying out the saloon doors. It wasn’t part of the scene at all—-I didn’t expect it.” Dwan decided to keep this unscripted scene in the film.

== Censorship ==
When Tide of Empire was released, many states and cities in the United States had censor boards that could require cuts or other eliminations before the film could be shown. The Chicago Board of Censors required the elimination of all execution scenes, which required the addition of film to maintain the synchronized sound track and maintain the continuity of the dialog sequences.

== See also ==
- List of early sound feature films (1926–1929)
