= Dorothy Gulliver =

American actress

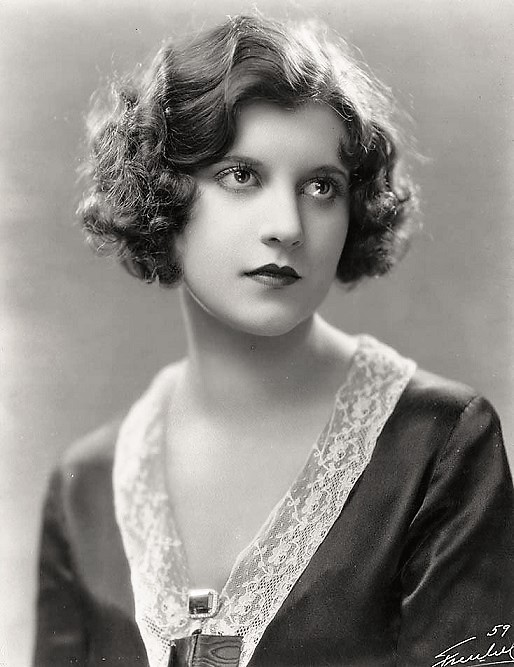
- Born: Dorothy Kathleen Gulliver; September 6, 1908; Salt Lake City, Utah, U.S.
- Died: May 23, 1997 (aged 88); Valley Center, California, U.S.
- Occupation: Actress

Dorothy Kathleen Gulliver (September 6, 1908 – May 23, 1997) was an American silent film actress, and one of the few to make a successful transition when films began using sound.

== Biography ==
The daughter of Mr. and Mrs. Fred Gulliver, she was born in Salt Lake City, Utah, in 1908 and was raised as a Mormon. From childhood, she wanted to be an actress. After she won the Miss Salt Lake City beauty contest in 1924, a scout for Paramount sought to have her go to Hollywood, but her mother opposed that plan. In June 1925, she won a beauty contest sponsored by Universal, with her awards including a six-month contract with Universal at a salary of $50 per week.

Gulliver's early work at Universal included two short films and two serials, The Winking Idol (1926) and Strings of Steel (1926). She was named as a 1928 WAMPAS Baby Star. Gulliver was part of The Collegians silent series of the late 1920s, and did some silent serials with William Desmond, Jack Hoxie, and Hoot Gibson. With the beginning of sound films, she became a popular heroine in 1930s "cliffhangers", including The Galloping Ghost, Phantom of the West, The Shadow of the Eagle, The Last Frontier, and 1936's Custer's Last Stand. Her costars were often Rex Lease, Tim McCoy, Jack Hoxie, and Wild Bill Elliott.

Gulliver was at one point married to Chester De Vito, an assistant director. She was also married to Charles Proctor.

While major roles faded and she had uncredited roles, she made movies until 1976 and had a main role in Faces (1968). She died in Valley Center, California, on May 23, 1997, aged 88.

== Filmography ==
Year	Title	Role	Notes
1926	The Winking Idol		Lost Film
1926	Strings of Steel		Lost Film
1926	The Shoot 'Em Up Kid		Short; Lost Film
1927	The Rambling Ranger	Ruth Buxley	Lost Film
1927	A Dog of the Regiment	Marie von Waldorf	Lost Film
1927	One Glorious Scrap	Joan Curtis	Lost Film
1927	The Shield of Honor	Gwen O'Day	
1928	Honeymoon Flats	Lila Garland	Lost Film
1928	Good Morning, Judge	Ruth Grey	Lost Film
1928	The Wild West Show	Ruth Henson	Lost Film
1928	Clearing the Trail	Ellen	Lost Film
1929	The Lariat Kid	Hagerty's Niece	Lost Film
1929	College Love	Dorothy Mae	Lost Film
1929	Night Parade	Doris O'Connell	
1929	Painted Faces	Babe Barnes	
1929	Mexicali Rose	Marie	Uncredited
1930	Troopers Three	Dorothy Clark	
1930	Under Montana Skies	Mary	
1931	The Phantom of the West	Mona Cortez	
1931	In Old Cheyenne	Helen Sutter	
1931	The Galloping Ghost	Barbara Courtland	Serial
1931	The Fighting Marshal	Alice Wheeler	
1932	The Shadow of the Eagle	Jean Gregory	
1932	The Honor of the Press	June Bonner	
1932	The Last Frontier	Betty Halliday	
1932	Outlaw Justice	June Taggart	
1933	Revenge at Monte Carlo	Diane	
1933	King Kong	New York Theatergoer	Uncredited
1933	Cheating Blondes	Lita	
1934	The Pecos Dandy	His Sweetheart	
1934	Stand Up and Cheer!	Stenographer	Uncredited
1935	Fighting Caballero	Pat	
1936	Custer's Last Stand	Red Fwan	
1938	In Early Arizona	Alice Weldon	
1939	North of Shanghai	Sue	
1939	Lone Star Pioneers	Virginia Crittenden	
1941	Appointment for Love	Minor Role	Uncredited
1941	Borrowed Hero	Snack Stand Clerk	Uncredited
1942	A Tragedy at Midnight	Miss Tindall	Uncredited
1942	The Traitor Within	Trucker's Wife	Uncredited
1944	Sweethearts of the U.S.A.	Defense Plant Worker	
1957	Official Detective	Mrs. Samka	Episode: " Armor Attack"
1968	Faces	Florence	
1976	Won Ton Ton, the Dog Who Saved Hollywood	Old Woman on Bus	Cameo Appearance, (final film role)

== Sources ==
- Lamparski, R. (1989) Whatever became of ...?, all new eleventh series, Crown Publishers Inc.: New York. ISBN 0 517 57150 1.
