= The Trouble Hunter =

1920 film

- Directed by: Jess Robbins
- Written by: Jess Robbins
- Produced by: Albert E. Smith
- Starring: Jimmy Aubrey; Oliver Hardy
- Production company: Vitagraph Studios
- Distributed by: Vitagraph Studios
- Release date: October 1920
- Country: United States
- Languages: Silent film English intertitles

The Trouble Hunter is a 1920 American silent short comedy film directed by Jess Robbins, featuring Jimmy Aubrey and Oliver Hardy.

== Plot ==
According to the copyright description, "Jimmy is attracted to the cafe in the slums by the odor of soup escaping through the air-shaft in a sidewalk. Making his entrance into the cafe in a most novel way when a Salvation Army band unconsciously gives him a shove, he finds the hospitality of the place barred by the vicious proprietor. Meanwhile a young girl, seeking her brother, falls into the hands of an unscrupulous scoundrel. The Salvation army lassie who had attracted the proprietor of the cafe, seeing her danger, follows her and pleads with the proprietor to save her. He orders his men to get her. Jimmy having gained one of the private "stalls" discovers her predicament, when she struggles with the scoundrel. He beats up the scoundrel, and likewise the three men who come after her. In escaping from them, he is almost caught by the invading police force. He seeks the back room where the proprietor had taken the Salvation Army lassie, interrupting a scene between the two. The proprietor is about to give Jimmy a good beating, when the little girl intervenes. There is a happy re-union between the two, when the proprietor discovers the girl to be his little sister, Jimmy is thanked and everybody is happy."

== Cast ==
- Jimmy Aubrey as A social error
- Evelyn Nelson as The Salvation Army lassie
- Oliver Hardy as The Bouncer (as Babe Hardy)
- Kathleen Myers as His sister

== Censorship ==
Before The Trouble Hunter could be exhibited in Kansas, the Kansas Board of Review required the removal of an intertitle saying "Send that dame in here" and scenes of men fighting for possession of a girl.

== See also ==
- List of American films of 1920
- Oliver Hardy filmography
