= Under Montana Skies =

1930 film

- Directed by: Richard Thorpe
- Written by: Jimmy Aubrey; Bennett Cohen
- Starring: Kenneth Harlan; Slim Summerville; Dorothy Gulliver
- Cinematography: Harry Zech
- Edited by: Carl Himm
- Production company: Tiffany Pictures
- Distributed by: Tiffany Pictures; Gaumont British Distributors (UK)
- Release date: September 10, 1930
- Running time: 58 minutes
- Country: United States
- Language: English

Under Montana Skies is a 1930 American pre-Code western film directed by Richard Thorpe and starring Kenneth Harlan, Slim Summerville and Dorothy Gulliver. It was produced and distributed by Tiffany Pictures, one of the leading independent studios in Hollywood.

== Plot ==
In a western town, cowboy Clay Conning gets a traveling musical troupe out of financial trouble so they can put on a show. However, a cattle rustler and old adversary of his makes off with the box office cash, leading to a pursuit.

== Cast ==
- Kenneth Harlan as Clay Conning
- Slim Summerville as Sunshine
- Dorothy Gulliver as Mary
- Nita Martan as Blondie
- Harry Todd as Abner Jenkins
- Ethel Wales as Martha Jenkins
- Lafe McKee as Sheriff Pinkie
- Christian J. Frank as Townsman
- Slim Whitaker as Henchman Joe
- Charles King as Frank Blake

== Censorship ==
Before Under Montana Skies could be exhibited in Kansas, the Kansas Board of Review required the removal of a scene where a woman and man are tumbling on the floor, where her "posterior" and legs are showing.

== Bibliography ==
- Pitts, Michael R. Western Movies: A Guide to 5,105 Feature Films. McFarland, 2012.
