= Clearing the Trail =

1928 film

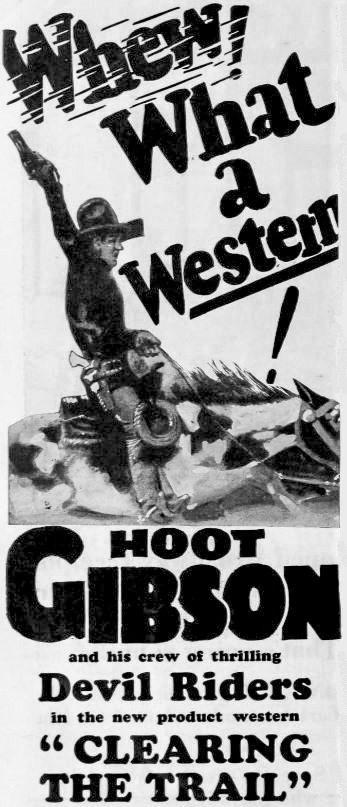
- Advertisement
- Directed by: B. Reeves Eason
- Produced by: Carl Laemmle
- Starring: Hoot Gibson; Dorothy Gulliver
- Cinematography: Harry Neumann
- Edited by: Gilmore Walker
- Distributed by: Universal Pictures
- Release date: October 7, 1928
- Running time: 60 minutes
- Country: United States
- Language: Silent (English intertitles)

Clearing the Trail is a 1928 American silent Western film directed by B. Reeves Eason and starring Hoot Gibson. It was produced and released through Universal Pictures.

== Cast ==
- Hoot Gibson as Pete Watson
- Dorothy Gulliver as Ellen
- Fred Gilman as Steve Watson
- C. E. Anderson as Don Talbot
- Philo McCullough as Silk Cardross
- Andrew Waldron as Judge Price (credited as Andy Waldron)
- Duke R. Lee as Cook (credited as Duke Lee)
- Monte Montague as Tramp
- The Universal Ranch Riders as Ranch Hands

== Production ==
Clearing the Trail was shot largely on location at Lone Pine, California.

== Preservation ==
With no prints of Clearing the Trail located in any film archives, it is a lost film.
