= Tongues of Scandal =

1927 film

- Directed by: Roy Clements
- Written by: Adele De Vore; George L. Sargent
- Starring: Mae Busch; William Desmond; Ray Hallor
- Cinematography: Leon Shamroy
- Edited by: Dave Rothschild
- Production company: Sterling Pictures
- Distributed by: Sterling Pictures
- Release date: January 3, 1927
- Running time: 60 minutes
- Country: United States
- Language: Silent (English intertitles)

Tongues of Scandal is a 1927 American silent drama film directed by Roy Clements and starring Mae Busch, William Desmond, and Ray Hallor.

== Synopsis ==
A politician's career and marriage are both threatened by a scandal caused by his younger brother's past antics.

== Cast ==
- Mae Busch as Helen Hanby
- William Desmond as Gov. John Rhodes
- Ray Hallor as Jimmy Rhodes
- Mathilde Brundage as Mrs. Rhodes
- Lloyd B. Carleton as Mr. Plunkett
- Wilfrid North as Mr. Collett
- James Gordon as O'Rourke
- Jerome La Grasse as Colvin
- De Sacia Mooers as Peggy Shaw

== Bibliography ==
- Connelly, Robert B. The Silents: Silent Feature Films, 1910-36, Volume 40, Issue 2. December Press, 1998.
- McCaffrey, Donald W. & Jacobs, Christopher P. Guide to the Silent Years of American Cinema. Greenwood Publishing, 1999. ISBN 0-313-30345-2
- Munden, Kenneth White. The American Film Institute Catalog of Motion Pictures Produced in the United States, Part 1. University of California Press, 1997.
