= A Motion to Adjourn =

1921 film

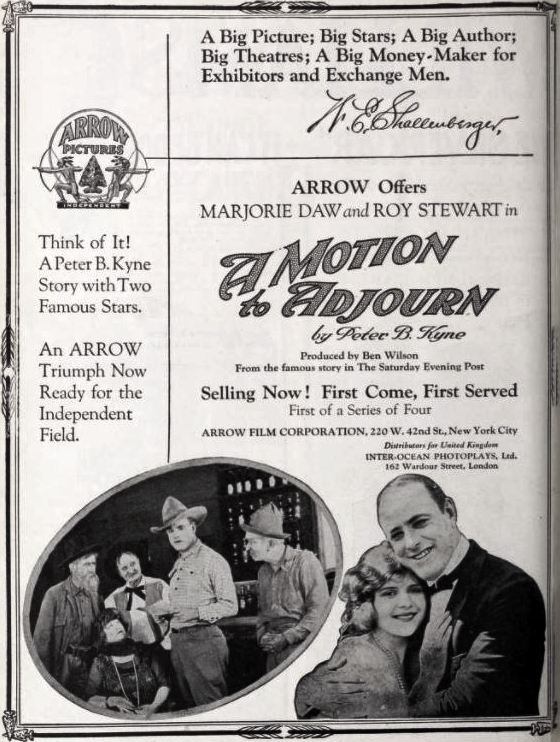
- Directed by: Roy Clements
- Written by: Roy Clements; Peter B. Kyne
- Produced by: Ben F. Wilson
- Starring: Harry L. Rattenberry; Roy Stewart; Marjorie Daw
- Production company: Ben Wilson Productions
- Distributed by: Arrow Film Corporation
- Release date: November 2, 1921
- Running time: 60 minutes
- Country: United States
- Languages: Silent; English intertitles

A Motion to Adjourn is a lost 1921 American silent comedy film directed by Roy Clements and starring Harry L. Rattenberry, Roy Stewart and Marjorie Daw.

== Plot ==
The playboy son of a wealthy New York financier is disinherited when he takes the blame for a crime committed by his brother and goes West to seek his own living in a mining town.

== Cast ==
- Harry L. Rattenberry as Silas Warner
- Roy Stewart as Silas Warner Jr.
- Sidney D'Albrook as Archie Warner
- Evelyn Nelson as Louise Warner
- Norval MacGregor as Doc Bleeker
- Marjorie Daw as Sally Bleeker
- Peggy Blackwood as Valentine
- William A. Carroll as Joe Selinsky
- Charles King as The Bartender
- William White as Faro Dan
- Jim Welch as Butterfly Kid

== Bibliography ==
- Munden, Kenneth White. The American Film Institute Catalog of Motion Pictures Produced in the United States, Part 1. University of California Press, 1997.
