= Strings of Steel =

1926 film

- Directed by: Henry MacRae
- Written by: Phillip Dutton Hurn; O.A.C. Lund
- Produced by: Henry MacRae
- Starring: William Desmond; Eileen Sedgwick
- Distributed by: Universal Pictures
- Release date: June 28, 1926
- Running time: 10 chapters
- Country: United States
- Language: Silent with English intertitles

Strings of Steel is a 1926 action film serial directed by Henry MacRae. The film is considered to be lost.

== Cast ==
- William Desmond as Ned Brown
- Eileen Sedgwick as Gloria Van Norton
- Albert J. Smith as Peter Allen
- Arthur Morrison as Jim Hogan
- George Ovey as Willie Gray
- Grace Cunard as Bowery Belle
- Alphonse Martell as Alexander Graham Bell
- Taylor N. Duncan as Theodore N. Vail
- Blanche Fisher
- Dorothy Gulliver

== See also ==
- List of film serials
- List of film serials by studio
