= Hills of Hate (1921 film) =

1921 film

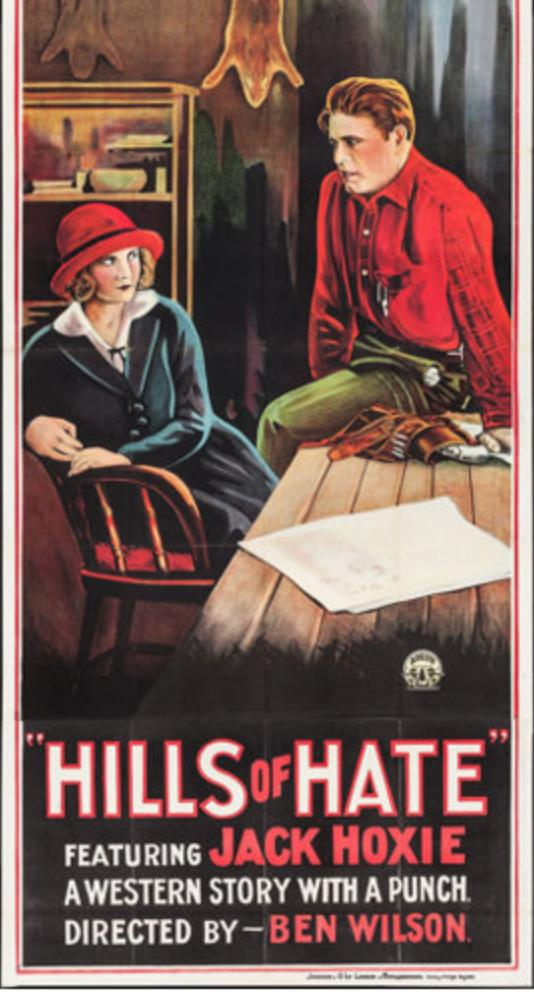
- Directed by: Ben F. Wilson
- Produced by: Ben F. Wilson
- Starring: Jack Hoxie; Wilbur McGaugh; Evelyn Nelson
- Production company: Ben Wilson Productions
- Distributed by: Arrow Film Corporation
- Release date: July 1921
- Running time: 50 minutes
- Country: United States
- Languages: Silent; English intertitles

Hills of Hate is a 1921 American silent Western film directed by Ben F. Wilson and starring Jack Hoxie, Wilbur McGaugh and Evelyn Nelson.

== Cast ==
- Jack Hoxie as Nate 'Hate' Hammond
- Wilbur McGaugh as Frayne
- Evelyn Nelson as Ann La Varre
- Marin Sais as Carmen
