= The Scarlet Drop =

1918 film directed by John Ford

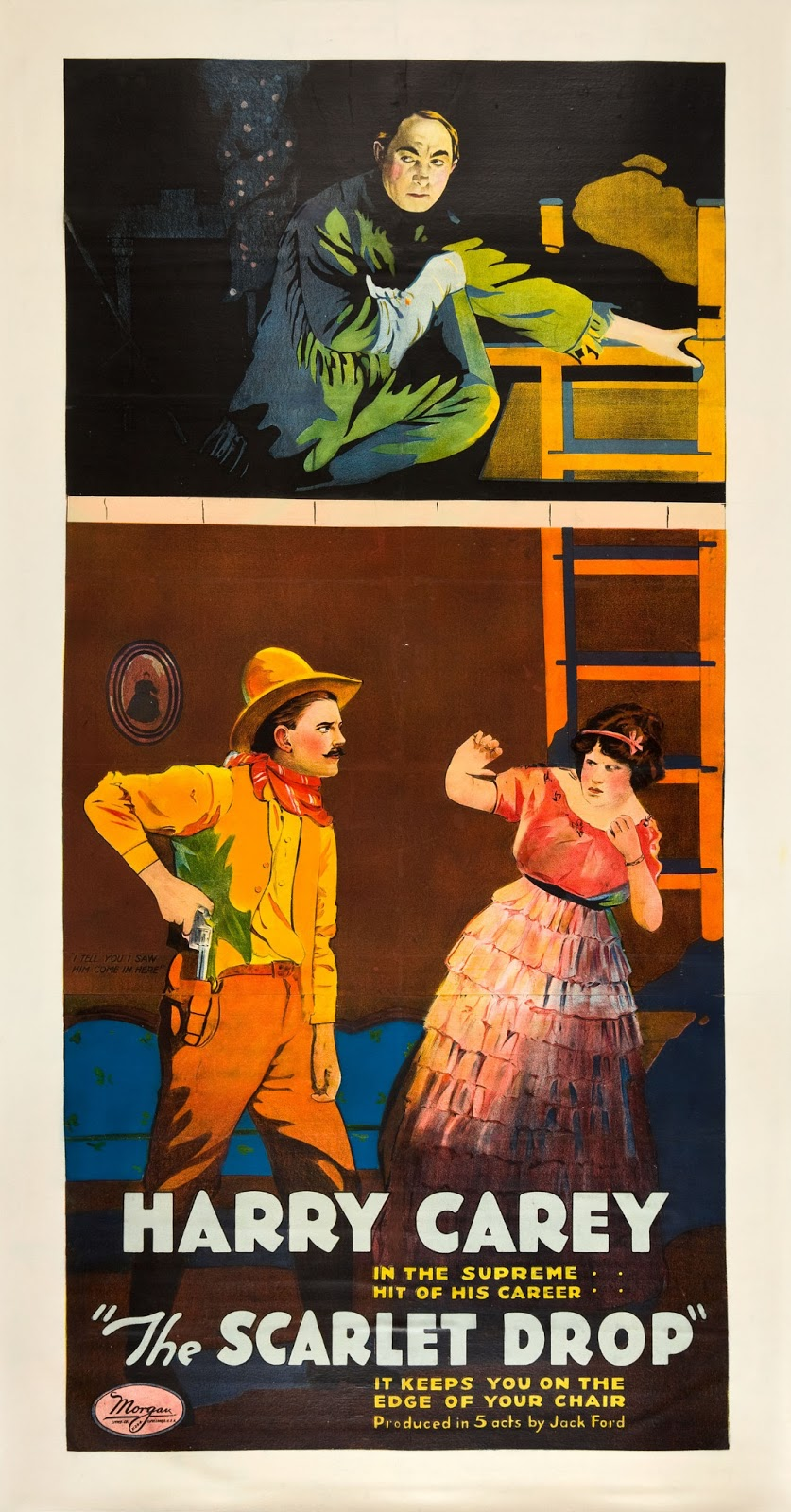
- Film poster
- Directed by: John Ford
- Written by: John Ford; George Hively
- Starring: Harry Carey
- Cinematography: Ben F. Reynolds
- Distributed by: Universal Film Manufacturing
- Release date: April 22, 1918
- Running time: 50 minutes
- Country: United States
- Languages: Silent; English intertitles

The Scarlet Drop is a 1918 American silent Western film directed by John Ford and featuring Harry Carey. The film was known through truncated copies only until January 2024, when a complete version was discovered in Chile.

== Plot ==
As described in a film magazine, "Kaintuck" Ridge refused admission to the local militia to fight on the side of Union in the American Civil War, joins a gang of marauders and at the end of the conflict finds himself a fugitive with a price on his head. He goes west and becomes a bandit. Marley Calvert, who kept Kaintuck out of the army, also goes west and takes up mining. Betty Calvert is taken captive when Kaintuck holds up a stage coach. His hatred for the Calverts is overcome by his admiration for Molly and later, when her honor is attacked by a former suitor, he defends her and wins her love.

== Cast ==
- Harry Carey as Harry "Kaintuck Harry" Ridge
- Molly Malone as Molly Calvert
- Vester Pegg as Marley Calvert
- Betty Schade as Betty Calvert
- Millard K. Wilson as Graham Lyons (credited as M.K. Wilson)
- Martha Mattox as Mammy
- Steve Clemente as Buck (credited as Steve Clemento)

== Censorship ==
Like many American films of the time, The Scarlet Drop was subject to cuts by city and state film censorship boards. For example, the Chicago Board of Censors issued an Adults Only permit for the film and cut, in Reel 2, the shooting of man standing in church yard, Reel 3, placing tree in road, all scenes of coach holdup except where young woman and bandit are conversing, two scenes of outlaws taking spoils from passengers, Reel 5, three fight scenes were man presses knife towards opponent, two scenes of men throwing knives, and man shooting Ridge.

== Rediscovery ==
For several decades, just over 30 minutes of footage of the film was thought to have survived in the Getty Images Archive. In January 2024, academic film historian Jaime Córdova Ortega discovered a complete version in an abandoned warehouse in Providencia, Chile. It was digitized and screened at the 2024 Valparaiso Recovered Film Festival, organized by Córdova Ortega.

== See also ==
- Harry Carey filmography
- List of films and television shows about the American Civil War
- List of rediscovered films
