= Wilbur McGaugh =

American actor and film director

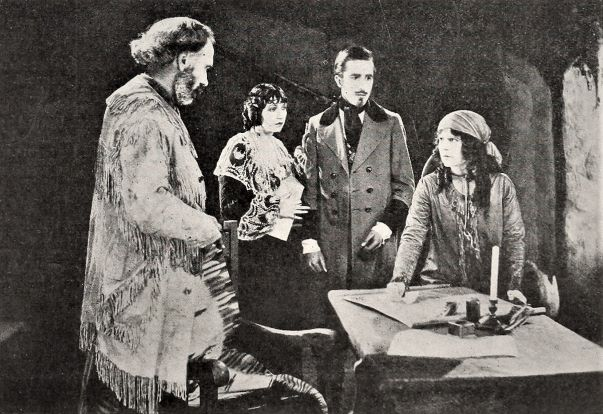
- Still from Days of '49 (1924) with McGaugh at center
- Born: March 12, 1895; Los Angeles, California, U.S.
- Died: January 31, 1965 (aged 69); Los Angeles, California, U.S.
- Occupations: Actor; director; assistant director
- Years active: 1921–1965 (film & TV)
- Spouse: Madelon Walsh (1939 - ?)

Wilbur McGaugh (March 12, 1895 – January 31, 1965) was an American film actor of the silent era, appearing mostly in westerns. He also directed five films. He also worked extensively as an assistant director in film and television.

McGaugh's parents were Mr. and Mrs. William McGaugh.

McGaugh's career changed with the advent of sound films. Described as "sadly inept in front of the microphones", he began working off-camera and became an assistant director for films in the 1930s and 1940s.

McGaugh married Madelon Walsh, a film stand-in, on July 28, 1939.

== Selected filmography ==
- Devil Dog Dawson (1921)
- The Broken Spur (1921)
- Cupid's Brand (1921)
- Dead or Alive (1921)
- Hills of Hate (1921)
- The Sheriff of Hope Eternal (1921)
- Peaceful Peters (1922)
- One Eighth Apache (1922)
- At Devil's Gorge (1923)
- The Law Rustlers (1923)
- The Santa Fe Trail (1923)
- Branded a Bandit (1924)
- Cupid's Rustler (1924)
- Bringin' Home the Bacon (1924)
- The Fugitive (1925)
- Roped by Radio (1925)
- Bad Man's Bluff (1926)
- Three Pals (1926)
- The Fire Fighters (1927)
- The Sky Skidder (1929)
- The Indians Are Coming (1930)
