= Dead or Alive (1921 film) =

1921 film directed by Dell Henderson

- Directed by: Dell Henderson
- Produced by: Ben F. Wilson
- Starring: Jack Hoxie; Joseph W. Girard; Marin Sais
- Production company: Ben Wilson Productions
- Distributed by: Arrow Film Corporation
- Release date: March 1921
- Running time: 50 minutes
- Country: United States
- Languages: Silent; English intertitles

Dead or Alive is a 1921 American silent Western film directed by Dell Henderson and starring Jack Hoxie, Joseph W. Girard and Marin Sais.

== Cast ==
- Jack Hoxie as Jack Stokes
- Joseph W. Girard as Sheriff Lamar
- Marin Sais as Sheriff Lamar's Wife
- C. Ray Florhe as Nate Stratton
- Wilbur McGaugh as Tom Stone
- Evelyn Nelson as Beulah Stone, Tom's Sister

== Preservation ==
With no holdings located in archives, Dead or Alive is considered a lost film.
