= The Honor of the Press =

1932 film

- Directed by: B. Reeves Eason
- Written by: John T. Neville; J.K. Foster; Michael L. Simmons
- Produced by: Fanchon Royer; George W. Weeks
- Starring: Edward J. Nugent; Rita La Roy; Dorothy Gulliver
- Cinematography: Ernest Miller
- Edited by: Frank Ware
- Production company: Fanchon Royer Pictures
- Distributed by: Mayfair Pictures
- Release date: July 14, 1932
- Running time: 58 minutes
- Country: United States
- Language: English

The Honor of the Press is a 1932 American Pre-Code crime film directed by B. Reeves Eason and starring Edward J. Nugent, Rita La Roy and Dorothy Gulliver. It was produced as a second feature for release by Mayfair Pictures. The film's sets were designed by the art director Paul Palmentola.

== Plot ==
Corrupt Roger Bradley buys a newspaper in order to promote his own shady dealings and denigrate the work of the city's police commissioner. A cub reporter on the paper discovers that Bradley and one of the other reporters are both involved in major crime.

== Cast ==
- Edward J. Nugent as Daniel E. Greely, Cub Reporter
- Rita La Roy as Daisy Tellem, Gossip Columnist
- Dorothy Gulliver as June Bonner, the Girlfriend
- Wheeler Oakman as Roger Bradley, Crooked Newspaper Owner
- Russell Simpson as City Editor Dan Perkins
- John Ince as Police Commissioner Drake
- Charles K. French as Dodson (editorial writer)
- Reginald Simpson as Larry Grayson (reporter)
- Franklin Parker as Sorrell "Sorry" Simpson (photographer)
- Franklyn Farnum as Mr. Sampson (publisher of The Herald)

== Bibliography ==
- Pitts, Michael R. Poverty Row Studios, 1929–1940: An Illustrated History of 55 Independent Film Companies, with a Filmography for Each. McFarland & Company, 2005.
