= Her Dangerous Path =

1923 film serial

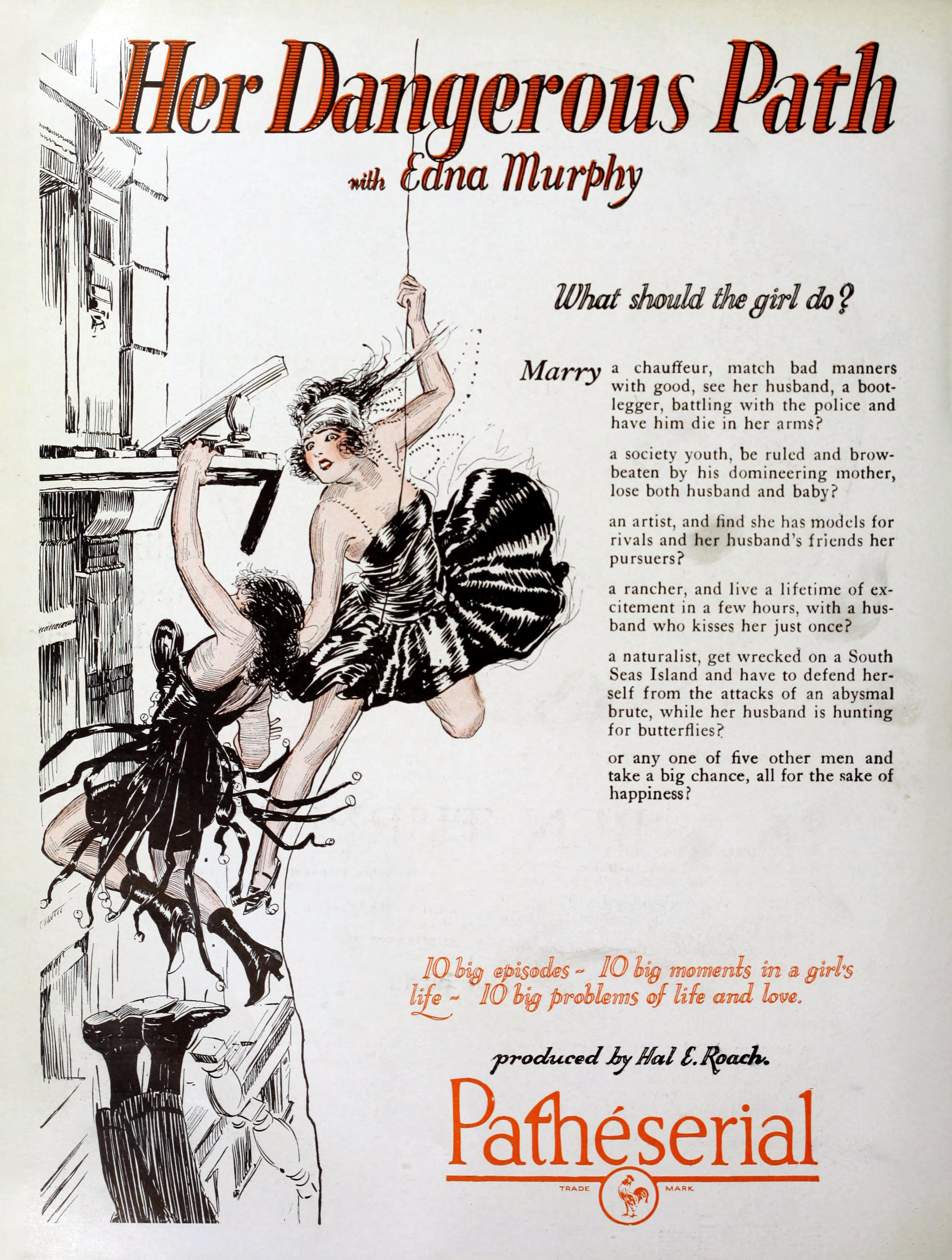
- Magazine advertisement
- Directed by: Roy Clements
- Written by: Frank Howard Clark
- Produced by: Hal Roach
- Starring: Edna Murphy; Charley Chase
- Release date: August 12, 1923 (U.S.)
- Running time: 10 episodes
- Country: United States
- Language: Silent (English intertitles)

Her Dangerous Path is a 1923 American adventure film serial directed by Roy Clements.

== Cast ==
- Edna Murphy as Corinne Grant
- Charley Chase as Glen Harper (as Charles Parrott)
- Hayford Hobbs as Donald Bartlett
- William F. Moran as Dr. Philip Markham
- Scott Pembroke as Dr. Harrison (as Percy Pembroke)
- William Gillespie as John Dryden
- Glenn Tryon as Reporter
- Ray Myers as Clinton Hodge
- Colin Kenny as Stanley Fleming
- Eddie Baker as Jack Reynolds (as Ed Baker)
- Fred McPherson as Professor Comstock
- Frank Lackteen as Malay George
- Sam Lufkin as Sam Comstock
- Fong Wong as Oracle of the Sands

== See also ==
- List of film serials
- List of film serials by studio
