= Fighting Caballero =

1935 film by Elmer Clifton

- Directed by: Elmer Clifton
- Written by: Elmer Clifton; George M. Merrick
- Produced by: George M. Merrick
- Starring: Rex Lease; Dorothy Gulliver
- Cinematography: Bert Longenecker
- Edited by: Carl Himm
- Production company: Weiss Productions Inc.
- Distributed by: Superior Talking Pictures Inc.
- Release date: May 5, 1935 (USA)
- Running time: 63 minutes
- Country: United States
- Language: English

Fighting Caballero is a 1935 American black-and-white Western B-film produced by Weiss Productions Inc. and distributed by Superior Talking Pictures Inc. It was one of a series of Westerns starring Rex Lease. It was produced by Louis Weiss from a screenplay by Elmer Clifton and George M. Merrick, and directed by Clifton.

== Cast ==
- Rex Lease as Jose Rodriguez, alias Joaquin Flores
- Dorothy Gulliver as Pat
- Earl Douglas as Pedro
- George Chesebro as Devil Jackson
- Robert Walker as Henchman Bull
- Wally Wales as Henchman Wildcat
- Milburn Moranti as Alkali Potts
- George Morell as Si Jenkins
- Pinkey Barnes as Mine Caretaker "Beetle"
- Paul Ellis as Henchman Manuel
- Marty Joyce as The Station Agent
- Barney Furey as The Sheriff
- Clyde McClary as The Deputy
- Franklyn Farnum as Bartender
