= Redskin (film) =

1929 film by Victor Schertzinger

- Theatrical release poster
- Directed by: Victor Schertzinger
- Written by: Julian Johnson
- Story by: Elizabeth Pickett Chevalier
- Produced by: J. G. Bachmann
- Starring: Richard Dix
- Cinematography: Edward Cronjager; Technicolor: Ray Rennahan; Edward Estabrook
- Edited by: Otho Lovering
- Music by: J. S. Zamecnik
- Production company: Paramount Famous Lasky Corp.
- Distributed by: Paramount Famous Lasky Corp.
- Release date: February 23, 1929 (US)
- Running time: 81 minutes
- Country: United States
- Languages: Sound (Synchronized); English Intertitles

Full film

Redskin is a 1929 American sound film with a synchronized musical score and sound effects, filmed partially in Technicolor. Its final six minutes were shown in Magnascope, an enlarged-screen projection novelty. The film, directed by Victor Schertzinger, stars Richard Dix and was produced and released by Paramount Famous Lasky Corp. Though not well remembered among the general public, the film is regarded highly by film historians for presenting sympathetic portrayals of Native Americans in the silent film era.

== Plot ==
After years of attending preparatory school and college in the Eastern United States, Wing Foot (Richard Dix), who after graduating finds out that he is an outcast in an overwhelmingly white society because of his race, returns to his Navajo tribe and renounces their customs and beliefs, becoming an outcast among his own people. He later secretly visits the village of a rival tribe in order to see Corn Blossom (Julie Carter), his sweetheart, who has also been to school in the East. Her people discover his presence, and he is forced to flee into the desert, where he discovers oil. White prospectors also find the oil, and Wing Foot races them to the claim office, filing his claim first. Faced with marriage to a man she does not love, Corn Blossom takes refuge in the Navajo village. Her people come to take her back, and a pitched battle between the tribes is averted only when Wing Foot arrives and tells both tribes of the new good fortune of the Indian nations. He then claims Corn Blossom as his own.

== Cast ==
- Richard Dix as Wing Foot
- Julie Carter as Corn Blossom
- Jane Novak as Judith Stearns
- Larry Steers as John Walton
- Tully Marshall as Navajo Jim
- Bernard Siegel as Chahi
- George Regas as Chief Notani
- Augustina López as Grandmother Yina
- Noble Johnson as Pueblo Jim
- Joseph W. Girard as Commissioner
- Jack Duane as Barrett
- Andrew J. Callaghan as Anderson
- Myra Kinch as Laughing Singer
- Philip Anderson as Wing Foot, age 9
- Lorraine Rivero as Corn Blossom, 6
- George Walker as Pueblo Jim, age 15

== Music ==
The film featured a theme song entitled “Redskin” by Harry D. Kerr (words) and J. S. Zamecnik (music). The theme song is sung on the film offscreen by Helen Clark on the soundtrack.

== Production ==
Technicolor was used for the scenes taking place on the Indians' land, while black-and-white (sepia-toned in the original projection prints) was used for the scenes set in the white man's world. Roughly three-fourths of the film is in color. Location shooting took place in Canyon de Chelly.

== Home video ==
Redskin is currently available in the United States on disc 4 of the DVD collection Treasures III: Social Issues in American Film, 1900-1934. At the time of release, only some of the original Vitaphone type soundtrack discs (reels 1, 3, and 8) were available, so much of the film is presented without audio. An alternative modern piano soundtrack was also presented on the release. Soundtrack discs for reels 2, 4, 5, 6, and 7 have been located and were used in the reconstruction made by the Vitaphone Soundtrack Project which is now on YouTube.

== See also ==
- List of early color feature films
- List of early sound feature films (1926–1929)
- The Vanishing American (1925)
