= The Rambling Ranger =

1927 film

- Directed by: Dell Henderson
- Screenplay by: George Hively
- Starring: Jack Hoxie; Dorothy Gulliver; C.E. Anderson; Monty Montague Jr. Charles Avery; Monte Montague
- Cinematography: William Nobles
- Production company: Universal Pictures
- Distributed by: Universal Pictures
- Release date: April 10, 1927
- Running time: 50 minutes
- Country: United States
- Languages: Silent; English intertitles

The Rambling Ranger is a 1927 American silent Western film directed by Dell Henderson and written by George Hively. The film stars Jack Hoxie, Dorothy Gulliver, C.E. Anderson, Monty Montague Jr., Charles Avery and Monte Montague. The film was released on April 10, 1927, by Universal Pictures.

== Cast ==
- Jack Hoxie as Hank Kinney
- Dorothy Gulliver as Ruth Buxley
- C.E. Anderson as Sam Bruce
- Monty Montague Jr. as Royal Highness
- Charles Avery as Seth Buxley
- Monte Montague as Sheriff Boy
