= Jack Hoxie =

American actor (1885–1965)

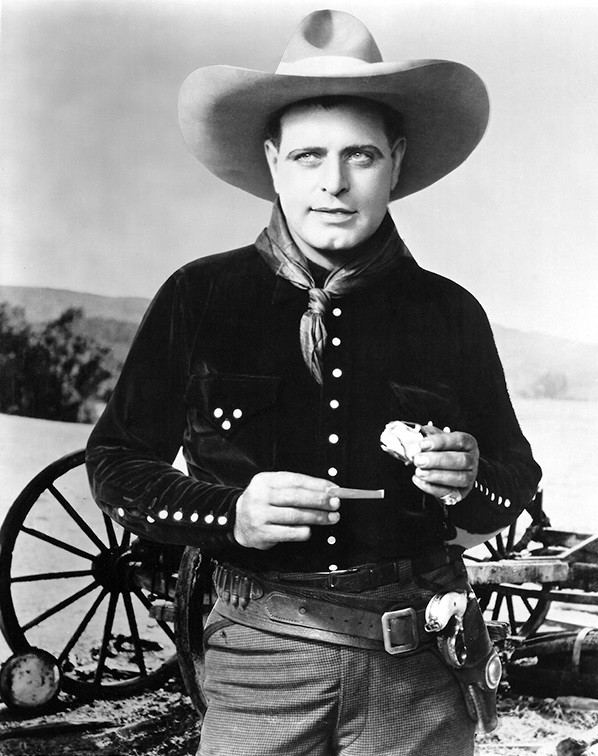
- Hoxie, c. 1920
- Born: John Hartford Hoxie; January 11, 1885; Kingfisher Creek, Indian Territory (Oklahoma), U.S.
- Died: March 28, 1965 (aged 80); Elkhart, Kansas, U.S.
- Other names: John F. Stone; Hart Hoxie; Hartford Hoxie; John Hart Hoxie; Jack Hart Hoxie; Art Hoxie
- Occupation: Actor
- Years active: 1913–1933
- Spouses: Pearl Gage (m. 1905; div. 1905) Hazel Louise Panting (divorced) Marin Sais (m. 1920; div. 1925) Dianne Juanita Hodges "Dixie Starr" (divorced) Bonnie Avis Showalter (m. 1944)

John Hartford Hoxie (January 11, 1885 – March 28, 1965) was an American rodeo performer and motion-picture actor whose career was most prominent in the silent film era of the 1910s through the 1930s. Hoxie is best recalled for his roles in Westerns and rarely strayed from the genre.

== Early life ==
Born in Kingfisher Creek in Indian Territory (now the state of Oklahoma), Hoxie was the son of a veterinarian father, Bart "Doc" Hoxie, who was killed in a horse accident just weeks before Jack's birth, and a half–Nez Perce mother (some reports list her as Cherokee), Matilda E. Hoxie (née Quick). After his father's death, his mother and he moved to northern Idaho where, at an early age, Hoxie became a working cowboy and ranch hand. Matilda married a rancher and horse trader named Calvin Scott Stone. The family then relocated to Boise, where Hoxie worked as a packer for a US Army fort in the area, continuing to hone his skill as a horseback rider while competing in rodeos. In 1905, aged 20, he married Pearl Gage. The marriage lasted only a few months before the couple divorced.

In 1909, he met performer Dick Stanley and joined his Wild West show. He performed as bronco rider in the show. During this period, Hoxie met and married his second wife, Hazel Panting, who was a Western trick rider with the outfit.

== Film career ==
Hoxie continued to tour with circuit rodeos until 1913, when he was approached to perform in the Western drama film short The Tragedy of Big Eagle Mine. Now billing himself as Hart Hoxie (a moniker he used until 1919), he continued working through the 1910s in popular Western shorts, often in small but well-received roles. In 1919, after appearing in roughly 35 films, he was cast in the starring role in the Paul Hurst-directed Lightning Bryce serials as main character Sky Bryce. Hoxie began billing himself as Jack Hoxie and used this name thereafter. In 1920, he met and married his third wife, actress and frequent co-star Marin Sais, after his divorce from Hazel Panting. Although he rarely strayed from the Western film genre, several notable exceptions include his role as Perrone in the 1916 historical drama The Dumb Girl of Portici, starring Anna Pavlova; a role in the 1916 epic drama film Joan the Woman starring Geraldine Farrar; and his role as Sandusky in the 1917 drama Nan of Music Mountain, starring Wallace Reid and Ann Little.

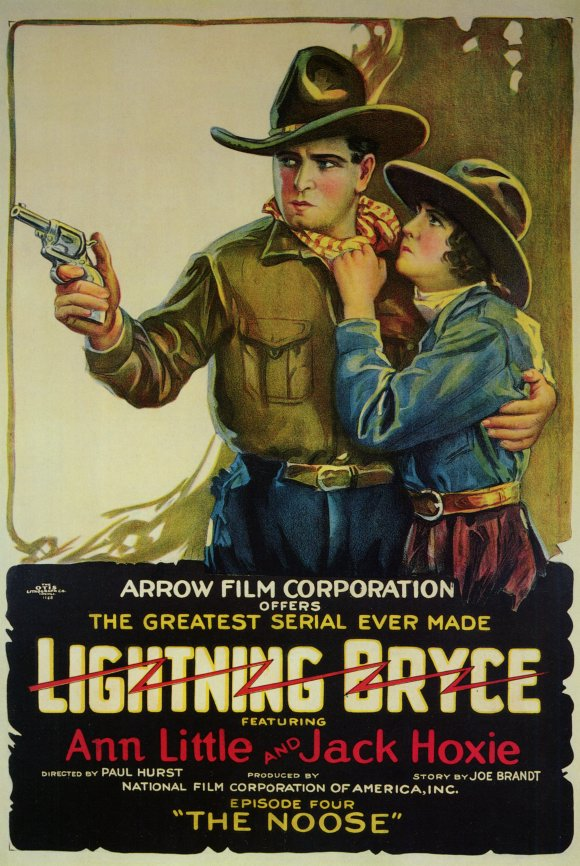
Hoxie in his first starring role in Lightning Bryce (1919) with Ann Little

Through the early 1920s, Hoxie became an extremely popular Western film star and worked for such film companies as Pathé Exchange, Arrow Film Corporation, and Sunset Pictures. In 1923, Universal Pictures head Carl Laemmle put Hoxie under contract and soon his career was on par with those of other Western stars of the era: Art Acord, Harry Carey, and Hoot Gibson. He appeared in such high-profile films as 1923's Where Is This West? with newcomer Mary Philbin and 1924's Universal promotional film Hello, 'Frisco, alongside such popular actors of the era as Jackie Coogan, Norman Kerry, Barbara La Marr, Antonio Moreno, Anna Q. Nilsson, Bebe Daniels, and Rin Tin Tin. The film was designed to showcase Universal's roster of its most popular actors. Hoxie, often atop his horses Fender and Dynamite, starred alongside such actresses as Marceline Day, Alice Day, Helen Holmes, Louise Lovely, Lottie Pickford, and Fay Wray in Westerns throughout the silent era.

Also during this period, Jack's younger half-brother Al Stone began to appear with him in films. Al eventually became a successful actor in the Western genre after changing his name to Al Hoxie and appearing in a series of films by actor/director J.P. McGowan.

In 1926, Laemmle and Universal chose Jack to star as Buffalo Bill Cody in Metropolitan Pictures' The Last Frontier, co-starring William Boyd. The film proved enormously successful. In 1927, however, Hoxie became dissatisfied with his contract at Universal and refused to renegotiate for another stint at the studio. He continued throughout the late 1920s making films with lower-rank film studios. He made his last silent film, Forbidden Trail, in 1929, before pursuing further work in circuit rodeos, carnivals, and the Miller Brothers 101 Ranch Wild West Show.

== Later life ==
During the 1930s, Hoxie made a brief comeback in films after signing a contract with low-budget studio Majestic Pictures. The films, however, did little to revive his acting career, so he once again hit the rodeo circuit. His last film appearance was in 1933's Trouble Busters with Lane Chandler, who had appeared alongside Hoxie in a number of earlier films.

Hoxie eventually divorced and married his fourth wife, Dixie Starr. The couple briefly operated the Broken Arrow Ranch, a dude ranch in Hereford, Arizona. After a fire consumed the ranch, Hoxie returned to Wild West shows, often billed as the "Famous Western Screen Star". Hoxie performed throughout the 1940s and well into the 1950s before finally making his last public appearance as a performer in 1959 for the Bill Tatum Circus at age 74.

Hoxie divorced Starr and married his fifth wife, Bonnie Avis Showalter, and the couple retired to a small ranch in Arkansas, then later moved to his mother Matilda's old homestead in Oklahoma. In his later years, Hoxie developed leukemia, and he died in 1965 at the age of 80. He was interred at the Willowbar Cemetery in Keyes, Oklahoma with the epitaph "A Star in Life - A Star in Heaven".

== Selected filmography ==
Hoxie with Dorothy Gulliver in Outlaw Justice (1932)

- Captain Courtesy (1915) - Martinez
- The Diamond from the Sky (1915) - Matt Hardigan
- The Scarlet Sin (1915) - 'Bull' Morgan
- Fatherhood (1915) - Del Beasley
- The Dumb Girl of Portici (1916) - Perrone
- Secret Love (1916) - Minor Role
- A Youth of Fortune (1916) - Gardener
- The Three Godfathers (1916) - Sheriff Pete Cushing
- The Girl from Frisco (1916) - Santone / The Sheriff
- Joan the Woman (1916)
- The Further Adventures of Stingaree (1917)
- The Man from Tia Juana (1917, Short) - The Sheriff (uncredited)
- A Whirlwind of Whiskers (1917, Short)
- Jack and Jill (1917) - Cactus Jim
- Nan of Music Mountain (1917) - Sandusky
- The Bull's Eye (1917)
- The Wolf and His Mate (1918) - Donald Bayne, 'The Wolf'
- 'Blue Blazes' Rawden (1918) - Joe La Barge
- Nobody's Wife (1918) - Jack Darling
- His Majesty, Bunker Bean (1918) - The greatest pitcher
- The Iron Test (1918)
- Johnny Get Your Gun (1919) - Bill Burnham
- The Love Call (1919) - Nick Horton
- The Valley of the Giants (1919) - Jules Rondeau
- Told in the Hills (1919) - Henry Hardy
- Lightning Bryce (1919) - Sky Bryce - aka Lightning Bryce
- Thunderbolt Jack (1920) - Jach Halliday
- Death Valley Kid (1920)
- A Man from Nowhere (1920) - Clay Norton
- Cyclone Bliss (1921) - Jack Bliss
- Dead or Alive (1921) - Jack Stokes
- Cupid's Brand (1921) - Reese Wharton
- The Sheriff of Hope Eternal (1921) - Drew Halliday
- Devil Dog Dawson (1921)
- The Broken Spur (1921) - 'Silent' Joe Dayton / Jacques Durand
- Hills of Hate (1921) - Nate 'Hate' Hammond
- The Double O (1921) - Happy Hanes
- Two-Fisted Jefferson (1922)
- The Desert's Crucible (1922) - Jack Hardy Jr. / Deerfoot
- The Desert Bridegroom (1922) - Jack Harkins
- Barb Wire (1922) - Jack Harding
- The Crow's Nest (1922) - Esteban
- Back Fire (1922) - 'Lightning' Carson
- Riders of the Law (1922) - Jack Meadows
- The Forbidden Trail (1923) - Jack Merriwell / Col. Jim Merriwell
- Gallopin' Through (1923) - Himself
- Wolf Tracks (1923) - John Hastings
- Don Quickshot of the Rio Grande (1923) - 'Pep' Pepper
- Desert Rider (1923) - Jack Sutherland
- Where is This West? (1923) - John Harley
- Men in the Raw (1923) - Windy Watkins
- The Red Warning (1923) - Philip Haver
- The Man from Wyoming (1924) - Ned Bannister
- The Phantom Horseman (1924) - Bob Winton
- The Galloping Ace (1924) - Jim Jordan
- Ridgeway of Montana (1924) - Buck Ridgeway
- The Back Trail (1924) - Jeff Prouty
- Fighting Fury (1924) - Clay Hill Sr. / Clay Hill Jr
- The Western Wallop (1924) - Bart Tullison
- Daring Chances (1924) - Jack Armstrong
- Hello, 'Frisco (1924) - Himself
- The Sign of the Cactus (1925) - Jack Hayes
- A Roaring Adventure (1925) - Duffy Burns
- Flying Hoofs (1925) - Frank Moody
- Ridin' Thunder (1925) - Jack Douglas
- Don Dare Devil (1925) - Jack Bannister
- The Red Rider (1925) - White Elk
- The White Outlaw (1925) - Jack Lupton
- Bustin' Thru (1925) - Jack Savage
- Hidden Loot (1925) - Cranner
- Two-Fisted Jones (1925) - Jack Wilbur
- The Demon (1926) - Dane Gordon
- A Six Shootin' Romance (1926) - 'Lightning' Jack
- The Border Sheriff (1926) - Sheriff Cultus Collins
- Looking for Trouble (1926) - Jack William Pepper
- The Fighting Peacemaker (1926) - 'Peace River' Parker
- The Last Frontier (1926) - Buffalo Bill Cody
- The Wild Horse Stampede (1926) - Jack Tanner
- Red Hot Leather (1926) - Jack Lane
- Rough and Ready (1927) - Ned Raleigh
- The Western Whirlwind (1927) - Jack Howard
- The Rambling Ranger (1927) - Hank Kinney
- Grinning Guns (1927) - 'Grinner' Martin
- Men of Daring (1927) - Jack Benton
- The Fighting Three (1927) - Jack Conway
- Heroes of the Wild (1927) - Jack Hale
- Forbidden Trail (1929)
- Gold (1932) - Jack Tarrant
- Outlaw Justice (1932) - Panamint Jack
- Law and Lawless (1932) - Montana
- Via Pony Express (1933) - Buck Carson
- Gun Law (1933) - The Sonora Kid
- Trouble Busters (1933) - Tex Blaine

== Sources ==
Hoxie Boys: The Lives and Films of Jack and Al Hoxie. by Edgar M. Wyatt, Wyatt Classics, Raleigh, NC. 1992.
