= The Law Rustlers =

1923 film

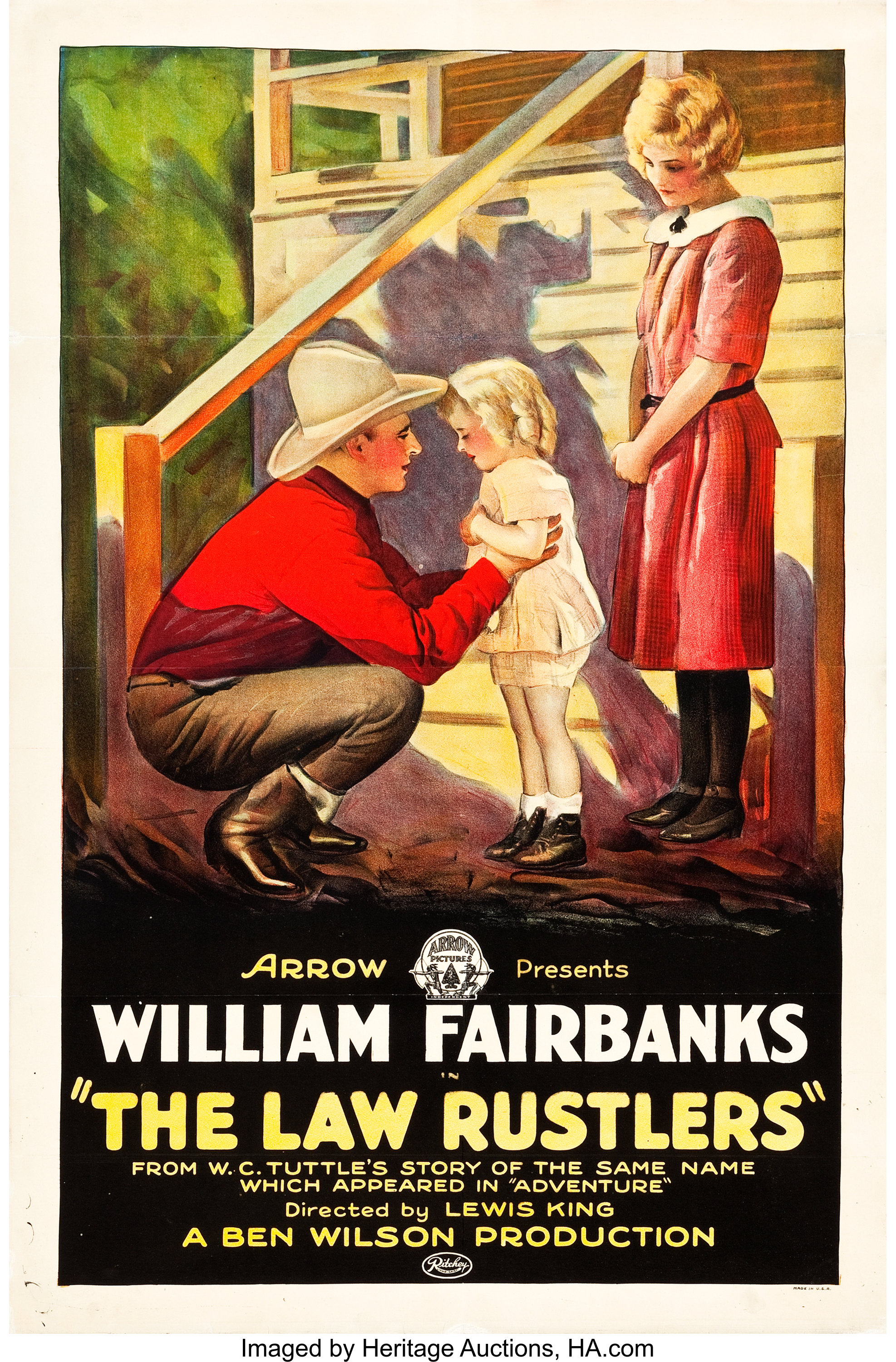
- Directed by: Louis King
- Written by: W.C. Tuttle
- Produced by: Ben F. Wilson
- Starring: William Fairbanks; Edmund Cobb; Joseph W. Girard
- Production company: Ben Wilson Productions
- Distributed by: Arrow Film Corporation
- Release date: March 30, 1923
- Running time: 50 minutes
- Country: United States
- Languages: Silent; English intertitles

The Law Rustlers is a 1923 American silent Western film directed by Louis King and starring William Fairbanks, Edmund Cobb and Joseph W. Girard.

== Synopsis ==
Two ranch hands set off for Alaska but stop in a town on the way, controlled by a criminal element.

== Cast ==
- William Fairbanks as Phil Stanley
- Edmund Cobb as Harry Hartley
- Joseph W. Girard as Sol Vane
- Ena Gregory as Glory Sillman
- Ashton Dearholt as Eph Sillman
- Wilbur McGaugh as John Cale
- Claude Payton as Doc Jordan
- Mark Hamilton as Preacher Cobb

== Bibliography ==
- Munden, Kenneth White. The American Film Institute Catalog of Motion Pictures Produced in the United States, Part 1. University of California Press, 1997.
