= W. C. Tuttle =

American writer (1883–1969)

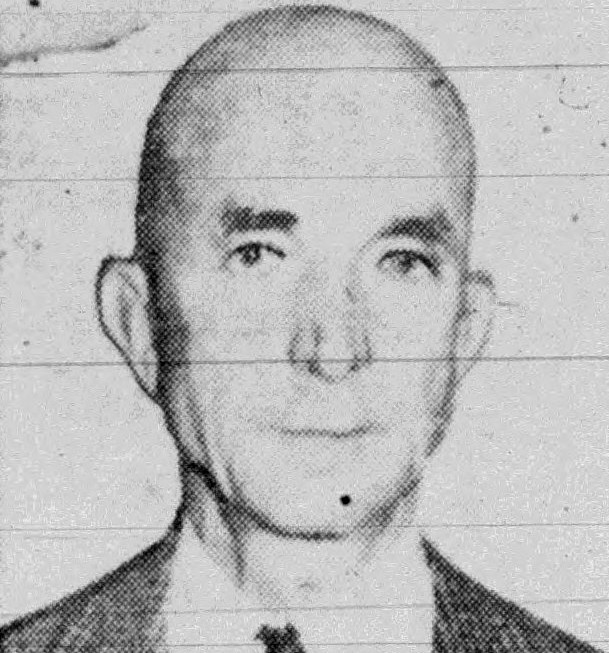
- Tuttle, circa 1942
- Born: November 11, 1883; Montana Territory USA
- Died: June 6, 1969 (aged 85); Los Angeles County, California USA
- Years active: 1915–1945

W. C. Tuttle (November 11, 1883 – June 6, 1969) was an American writer who sold more than 1000 magazine stories and dozens of novels, almost all of which were westerns.

== Biography ==
Tuttle wrote mainly for pulp magazines; his main market was Adventure magazine. In a 1930 poll of its readers, Tuttle was voted the most popular writer in the magazine. Tuttle also wrote for other publications such as Argosy, Short Stories, Street & Smith’s Western Story Magazine, Field & Stream, West, New Western Magazine and Exciting Western. His best known character was Hashknife Hartley, who along with his friend Sleepy Stevens, served as unofficial detectives solving crimes on the ranches where they worked as cowboys. The Hashknife stories combined the western story with the detective story. Fellow western author and editor Jeff Sadler stated Tuttle's writing is "at its best" in the Hashknife stories. Sadler also claims Tuttle's novel Vanishing Brands is his finest novel:"...terse and dramatic, flecked with dry touches of wit, the novel is an excellent example of the Western form and a credit to its author". Other characters Tuttle created included Cultus Collins, Sad Sontag, and Henry Harrison Conroy, a former vaudeville actor turned sheriff.

In 1950–1951, Tuttle was narrator of the old-time radio series Hashknife Hartley, which featured adaptations of his stories.

He was also a screenwriter hailing back to the silent era. He wrote the screenplays for 52 films between 1915 and 1945.

A semi-pro baseball player in his youth, Tuttle served as President of the Pacific Coast Baseball League 1935–1943. Tuttle recommended to the Los Angeles Angels that the team should ask Gene Lillard to join them.

He was born in Montana, and died in Los Angeles County, California.

== Bibliography ==
"Hashknife" Novels

- In Self-defense (1917)
- Upside Down or Backwards (1918)
- Hashknife of the Double Bar 8 (1920)
- Law Rustlers (1921)
- The Ranch of the Tombstones (1922)
- The Dead-Line (1924)
- Hidden Blood (1925)
- The Buckaroo of Blue Wells (1926)
- The Devil's Dooryard (1927)
- Shotgun Gold (1927)
- Thicker Than Water (1927)
- The Morgan Trail (1928)
- Hidden Blood (1929)
- The Valley of Twisted Trails (1931)
- The Silver Bar Mystery (1933)
- Rifled Gold (1934)
- Tumbling River Range (1935)
- Bluffer's Luck (1937)
- The Medicine-man (1939)
- The Valley of Vanishing Herds (1942)
- The Tin God of Twisted River (1945)
- Wolf Creek Valley (1946)
- The Trouble Trailer (1946)
- Shotgun Gold (1950)
- The Shadow Shooter (1955)
- Passengers for Painted Rock (1962)
- Double-crossers of Ghost Tree (1965)
- The Payroll of Fate (1966)
- Medicine Maker (1967)
- Vanishing Brands (1977)
- Red Trail of a Forty-one (1978)

Other Novels

- Psychology and Copper (1916)
- All Wool (1916)
- A Man-Sized Pet (1916)
- When Oscar Went Wild (1916)
- Bearly Reasonable (1917)
- A Prevaricated Parade (1918)
- Making Good for Muley (1918)
- Tied Up for Tombstone (1918)
- Dough or Dynamite (1918)
- Loco or Love (1918)
- Playing Safe in Piperock (1919)
- The Color of His Boots (1919)
- Shepherds for Science (1920)
- Wise Men and a Mule (1922)
- Creepin' Tintypes (1921)
- Too Much Progress for Piperock (1922)
- Flames of the Storm (1922)
- Ajax, for Example (1922)
- Reputation (1923)
- Spawn of the Desert (1924)
- Cinders (1924)
- Two Fares East (1926)
- The Taking of Cloudy McGee (1926)
- The Valley of Lost Herds (1927)
- Rodeo (1927)
- By Order of Buck Brady (1928)
- Sontag of Sundown (1929)
- The Keeper of Red Horse Pass (1930)
- Mystery At the JHC Ranch (1932)
- Singing River (1934)
- The Flood of Fate (1935)
- The Keeper of Red Horse Pass (1936)
- Wild Horse Valley (1938)
- Salt for the Tiger (1952)
- Renegade Sheriff (1953)
- Mission River Justice (1955)
- Thunderbird Range (1955)
- The Shame of Arizona (1957)
- The King of Dancing Valley (1958)
- Danger Trail (1958)
- The Trail to Kingdom Come (1960)
- Gold at K-BAR-T (1961)
- Galloping Gold (1961)
- Double Trouble (1964)
- Arizona Drifters (1964)
- Road to the Moon (1965)
- Stockade (1965)
- Buckshot Range (1966)
- The Lone Wolf (1967)
- West of Aztec Pass (1972)
- Greenhorn Trail (1976)
- King of Blue Grass Valley (1977)
- The Trail of Deceit (1985)

== Selected filmography ==
- Cinders (1920)
- The Stranger (1920)
- Fight It Out (1920)
- The Man with the Punch (1920)
- Fools of Fortune (1922)
- The Law Rustlers (1923)
- The Prairie Pirate (1925)
- Western Pluck (1926)
- Rustlers' Ranch (1926)
- The Wild Horse Stampede (1926)
- Driftin' Sands (1928)
- The Red Rider (1934)
