= The Arizona Cyclone =

1928 film

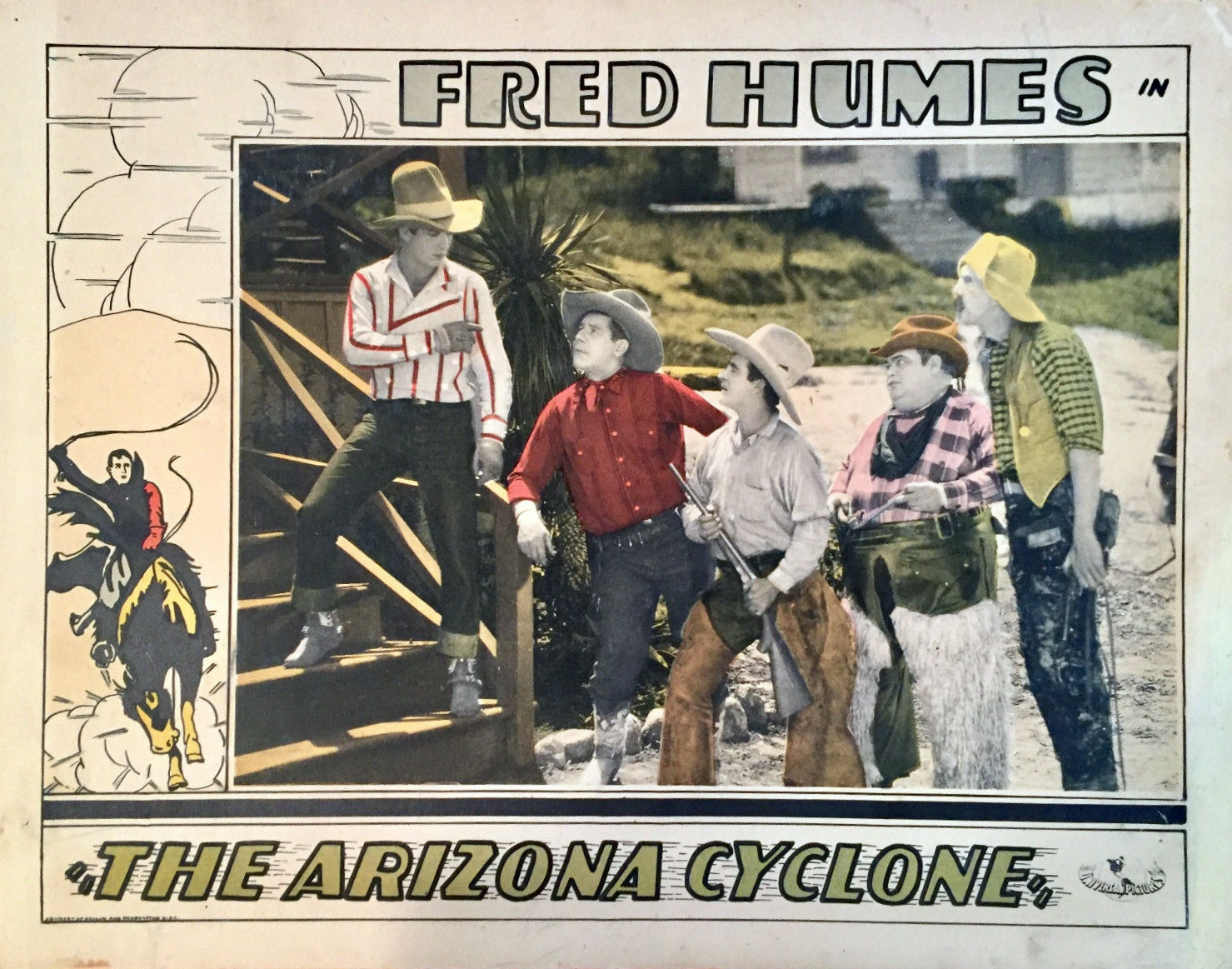
- Lobby card
- Directed by: Edgar Lewis
- Screenplay by: William Berke; Gardner Bradford
- Starring: Fred Humes; George B. French; Margaret Gray; Cuyler Supplee; Gilbert Holmes; Ben Corbett
- Cinematography: Edward Linden; Wilfred M. Cline
- Edited by: Jack Jackson
- Production company: Universal Pictures
- Distributed by: Universal Pictures
- Release date: May 6, 1928
- Running time: 50 minutes
- Country: United States
- Languages: Silent; English intertitles

The Arizona Cyclone is a 1928 American silent Western film directed by Edgar Lewis, and written by William Berke and Gardner Bradford. The film stars Fred Humes, George B. French, Margaret Gray, Cuyler Supplee, Gilbert Holmes, and Ben Corbett. The film was released on May 6, 1928, by Universal Pictures.

== Cast ==
- Fred Humes as Larry Day / Tom Day
- George B. French as John Cosgrove
- Margaret Gray as Kathleen Cosgrove
- Cuyler Supplee as Mel Craven
- Gilbert Holmes as Pee Wee
- Ben Corbett as Benny
- Richard L'Estrange as Lazy Lester
- Scotty Mattraw as Scotty
- Lightning as Larry's Horse

== Preservation ==
With no holdings located in archives, The Arizona Cyclone is considered a lost film.
