= Gilbert Holmes (actor) =

Canadian former actor and stunt performer

Gilbert "Pee Wee" Holmes
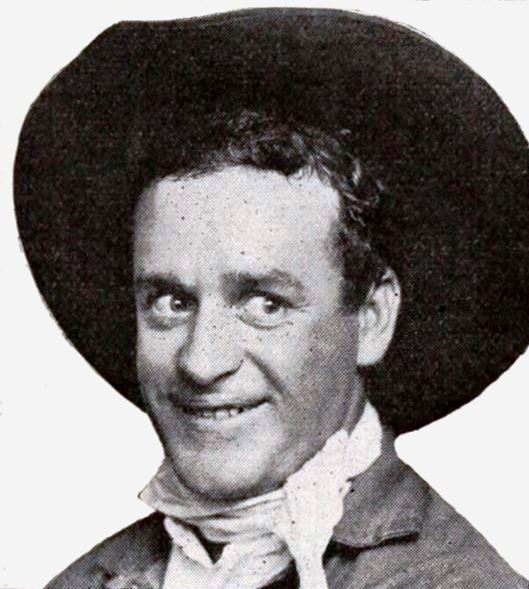
- Fraom a 1925 magazine
- Born: June 15, 1895; Saskatchewan, Canada
- Died: August 17, 1936 (aged 41); Los Angeles, California, USA
- Occupations: Actor, stuntman

Gilbert "Pee Wee" Holmes was a Canadian actor and stunt performer known for his short stature. He appeared in more than 70 Hollywood films between 1920 and 1934, and often co-starred in Tom Mix comedy Westerns.

== Biography ==
Gilbert was born in Saskatchewan, Canada, and raised in Miles City, Montana. Before he became an actor, he competed in rodeos around the United States. In the early 1920s, he began appearing in Hollywood westerns. During that decade, he and Ben Corbett produced and starred in a series of comedy shorts that ran before Universal's feature-length Westerns. He died on August 17, 1936, in Los Angeles, California.

== Partial filmography ==
- Ruth of the Rockies (1920)
- The Buster (1923)
- The Man Who Won (1923)
- The Mask of Lopez (1924)
- Ladies to Board (1924)
- The Tenth Woman (1924)
- Code of the West (1925)
- Chip of the Flying U (1926)
- The Phantom Bullet (1926)
- Hard Fists (1927)
- The Border Cavalier (1927)
- One Glorious Scrap (1927)
- Galloping Fury (1927)
- The Fearless Rider (1928)
- Put 'Em Up (1928)
- Thunder Riders (1928)
- Trail Riders (1928)
- The Arizona Cyclone (1928)
- Quick Triggers (1928)
- Beggars of Life (1928)
- The Cloud Dodger (1928)
- Burning the Wind (1928)
- The Sky Skidder (1929)
- Sunset Pass (1929)
- Points West (1929)
- Sagebrush Politics (1929)
- The Mounted Stranger (1930)
- Mountain Justice (1930)
- Trigger Tricks (1930)
- In Old Cheyenne (1931)
- Lightnin' Smith Returns (1931)
- Desert Vengeance (1931)
- The Man from Hell's Edges (1932)
- Law of the North (1932)
- Hidden Gold (1932)
- The Fighting Champ (1932)
- Flaming Guns (1932)
- Robbers' Roost (1932)
- The Border Sheriff (1926)
- The Rustler's Roundup (1933)
- Western Racketeers (1934)
