= Points West =

Points West may refer to:

- BBC Points West, the BBC's regional TV news programme for the West of England
- Points West (film), a 1929 silent film western
- "Points West", a magazine published by the Buffalo Bill Center of the West
