= Two Fisted Justice =

Two Fisted Justice may refer to:

- Two Fisted Justice (1924 film), a silent western film directed by Dick Hatton
- Two Fisted Justice (1931 film), a western film directed by George Arthur Durlam
- Two Fisted Justice (1943 film), a western film directed by Robert Emmett Tansey
