= The Fearless Rider =

1928 film

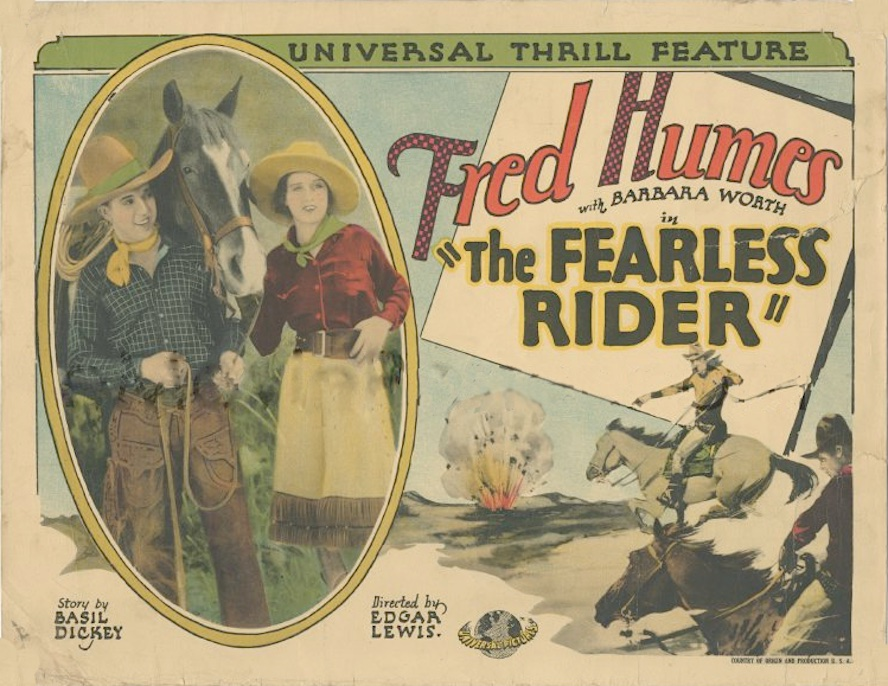
- Lobby card
- Directed by: Edgar Lewis
- Screenplay by: Basil Dickey; Gardner Bradford
- Story by: Basil Dickey
- Starring: Fred Humes; Barbara Worth; Ben Corbett; Gilbert Holmes; Buck Connors; William Steele
- Cinematography: Wilfred M. Cline
- Edited by: Jack Jackson; Harry Marker
- Production company: Universal Pictures
- Distributed by: Universal Pictures
- Release date: January 15, 1928
- Running time: 55 minutes
- Country: United States
- Languages: Silent; English intertitles

The Fearless Rider is a 1928 American silent Western film directed by Edgar Lewis and written by Basil Dickey and Gardner Bradford. The film stars Fred Humes, Barbara Worth, Ben Corbett, Gilbert Holmes, Buck Connors and William Steele. The film was released on January 15, 1928, by Universal Pictures. A print of The Fearless Rider exists.

== Cast ==
- Fred Humes as Larry Day
- Barbara Worth as Kate Lane
- Ben Corbett as Hank Hook
- Gilbert Holmes as Two-Spot Tommy
- Buck Connors as Jeff Lane
- William Steele as Dr. Lucifer Blade
