= Code of the Cow Country =

1927 film

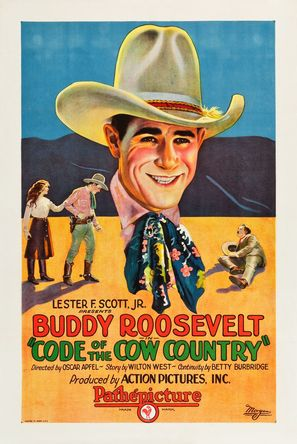
- Theatrical release poster
- Directed by: Oscar Apfel
- Screenplay by: Betty Burbridge
- Story by: Wilton West
- Produced by: Lester F. Scott Jr.
- Starring: Buddy Roosevelt; Hank Bell; Elsa Benham; Melbourne MacDowell; James Sheridan; Richard Neill
- Cinematography: Ray Ries
- Production company: Action Pictures
- Distributed by: Pathé Exchange
- Release date: June 19, 1927
- Running time: 50 minutes
- Country: United States
- Languages: Silent; English intertitles

Code of the Cow Country is a 1927 American silent Western film directed by Oscar Apfel and written by Betty Burbridge. The film stars Buddy Roosevelt, Hank Bell, Elsa Benham, Melbourne MacDowell, James Sheridan and Richard Neill. The film was released on June 19, 1927, by Pathé Exchange.

== Cast ==
- Buddy Roosevelt as Jim West
- Hank Bell as Red Irwin
- Elsa Benham as Helen Calhoun
- Melbourne MacDowell as John Calhoun
- James Sheridan as Ted Calhoun
- Richard Neill as Bill Jackson
- Walter Maly as Dutch Moore
- Frank Ellis as Tallas
- Ruth Royce as Dolores
