= The Border Cavalier =

1927 film

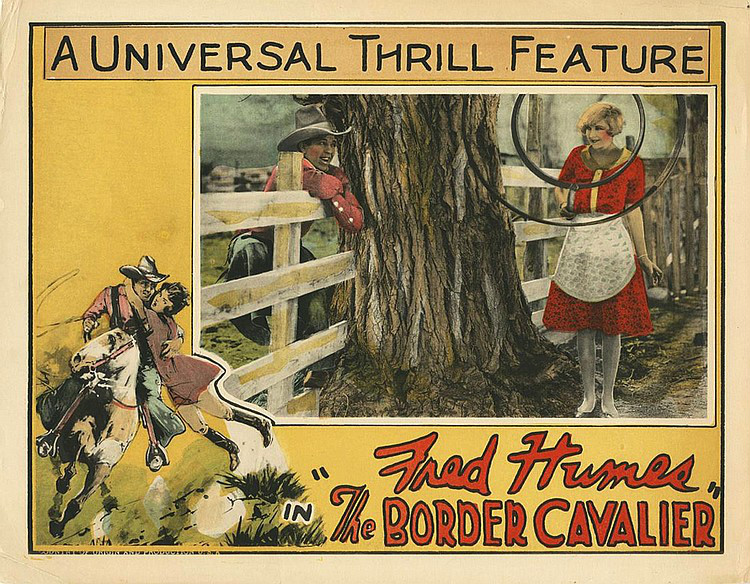
- Lobby card
- Directed by: William Wyler
- Screenplay by: Basil Dickey; Gardner Bradford
- Story by: Basil Dickey
- Starring: Fred Humes; Evelyn Peirce; C.E. Anderson; William Barrymore; Joyce Compton; Dick La Reno
- Cinematography: Alan Jones
- Production company: Universal Pictures
- Distributed by: Universal Pictures
- Release date: September 18, 1927
- Running time: 50 minutes
- Country: United States
- Language: Silent (English intertitles)

The Border Cavalier is a 1927 American silent Western film directed by William Wyler and written by Basil Dickey and Gardner Bradford. The film stars Fred Humes, Evelyn Peirce, C.E. Anderson, William Barrymore, Joyce Compton, and Dick La Reno. The film was released on September 18, 1927, by Universal Pictures.

== Plot ==
As described in a film magazine, Victor Harding, a crooked Eastern land speculator, has inside dope on a new railroad spur which will increase the value of the Lawton ranch. He conspires with Hank Martin, a roadhouse proprietor, to buy the ranch before Lawton learns about it. He falls in love with Madge, the daughter of the owner, who has a beautiful singing voice, and he urges her and her father to sell the ranch and go to New York where Madge could receive vocal training. Larry Day, foreman of the Lawton ranch and also in love with Madge, arrives. Suspecting treachery, he gives Harding a good thrashing. This only serves to discredit Larry in the eyes of Madge and her father, and Larry and his four riders are discharged. Larry and his boys determine to save Lawton and, while they are waiting for an answer to Larry's telegram regarding the proposed spur track, Lawton leaves for town in a buggy to sign Harding's contract. Larry and his boys make Lawton a prisoner and, when the answering telegram arrives at the ranch house, Madge opens it and discovers that Larry was really trying to help them. She rides hard for the tavern in an effort to stop the deal. Meanwhile, Larry has bearded Harding and Martin in their stronghold, the inn, and has been captured and tied in an upstairs room. The boys discover his prison and succeed in their rescue. They also save Madge from complications and all ends well.

== Cast ==
- Fred Humes as Larry Day
- Evelyn Peirce as Anne Martin
- C.E. Anderson as Beaver Martin
- William Barrymore as Victor Harding (credited as Boris Bullock)
- Joyce Compton as Madge Lawton
- Dick La Reno as Dave Lawton
- Richard L'Estrange as Lazy (credited as Dick L'Estrange)
- Gilbert Holmes as Pee Wee
- Ben Corbett as Bennie (credited as Benny Corbett)
- Scotty Mattraw

== Preservation ==
With no holdings located in archives, The Border Cavalier is considered a lost film.
