= Helen Broneau =

American actress and screenwriter

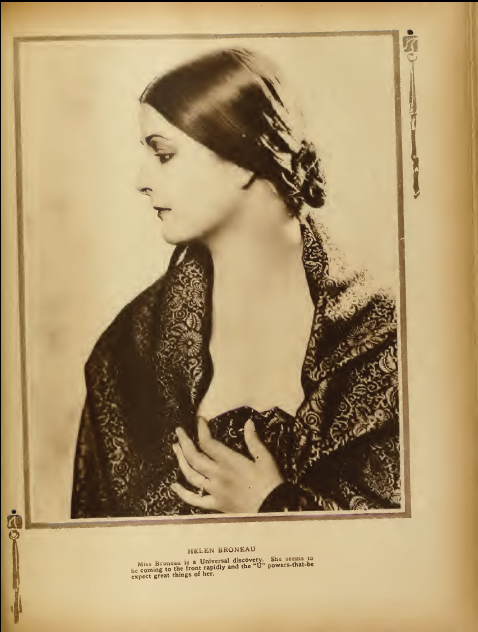
- Broneau in 1920
- Born: Helen Elizabeth Ingram; December 20, 1894; Missouri, U.S.
- Died: December 31, 1972 (aged 78); Los Angeles, California, U.S.
- Occupations: Actress, screenwriter
- Spouse: Frank Baker (1929-1972, her death)

Helen Broneau (born Helen Ingram) was an American actress and screenwriter who was active in Hollywood during the silent era. After a brief union with Charles Bronaugh (the source of her stage name, albeit with an altered spelling), she married Australian actor Frank Baker in 1929; the pair remained together until her death in 1972.

== Selected filmography ==
=== As actress ===
- A Romeo of the Range (1928)
- The Winking Idol (1926)
- Secret Service Sanders (1925)
- Scar Hanan (1925)
- The Desert Hawk (1924)
- Western Yesterdays (1924)
- The Hunchback of Notre Dame (1923)
- Merry-Go-Round (1923)
- Crossed Wires (1923)
- The Radio King (1922)
- The Punctured Prince (1922)
- All Dolled Up (1921)
- The Triflers (1920)

=== As screenwriter ===
- O.U.T. West (1925)
