= The Gallant Fool =

The Gallant Fool may refer to:

- The Gallant Fool (1926 film), an American silent film directed by Duke Worne
- The Gallant Fool (1933 film), an American film directed by Robert N. Bradbury
