= Western Courage =

Western Courage may refer to:

- Western Courage (1927 film), an American silent Western film
- Western Courage (1935 film), an American Western film
