= Riders of the Plains =

1924 film

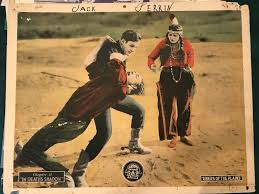
- Directed by: Jacques Jaccard
- Written by: Karl R. Coolidge; Jacques Jaccard
- Starring: Jack Perrin; Marilyn Mills
- Distributed by: Arrow Film Corporation
- Release date: October 1, 1924 (Chapter One)
- Running time: 15 episodes (5 hours, 10 minutes)
- Country: United States
- Languages: Silent; English intertitles

Riders of the Plains is a 1924 American silent Western film serial directed by Jacques Jaccard for Arrow Films. It was co-written by Karl R. Coolidge and Jacques Jaccard.

This serial was one of Boris Karloff's early (uncredited) film appearances. Chapter one premiered on October 1, 1924, and the final chapter played theaters on December 22, 1924 The serial is considered a lost film.

== Cast ==
- Jack Perrin
- Marilyn Mills
- Ruth Royce
- Charles Brinley
- Kingsley Benedict
- Running Elk
- Robert Miles
- Rhody Hathaway
- Clark Comstock
- Boris Karloff in a bit part

== Chapter Titles ==
- 1. Red Shadows
- 2. Dangerous Hazards
- 3. A Living Death
- 4. Flames of Fury
- 5. Morgan's Raid
- 6. Out of the Past
- 7. A Fighting Gamble
- 8. A Prisoner of War
- 9. Pawns of Destiny
- 10. Riding for Life
- 11. In Death's Shadow
- 12. Flaming Vengeance
- 13. Thundering Hoofs
- 14. Red Talons
- 15. The Reckoning

== See also ==
- List of film serials
- List of film serials by studio
- Boris Karloff filmography
