= Rough Ridin' =

1924 film

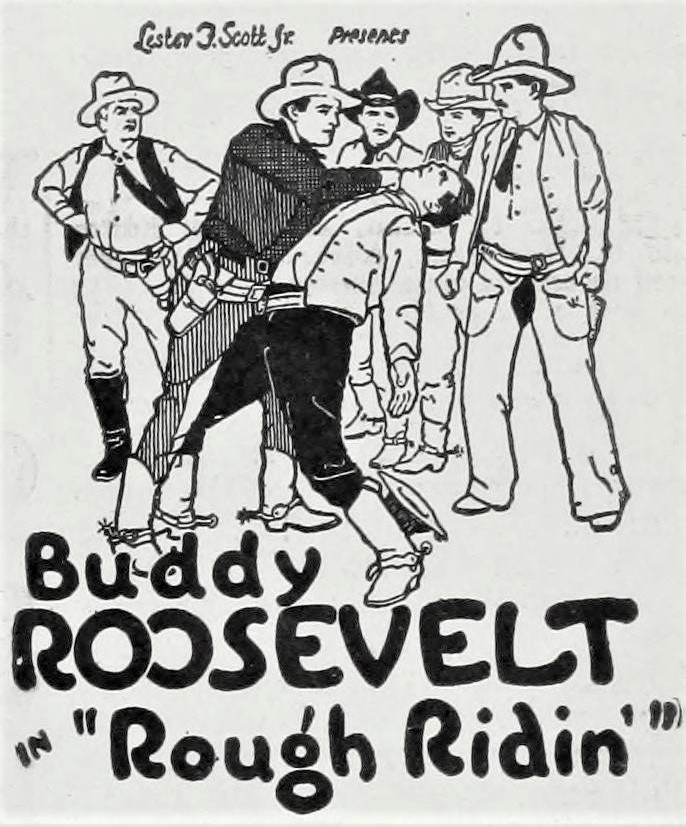
- Advertisement
- Directed by: Richard Thorpe
- Written by: Margaret M. Harris; Betty Burbridge
- Produced by: Lester F. Scott
- Starring: Buddy Roosevelt
- Cinematography: Ernest Haller
- Production company: Approved Pictures
- Distributed by: Weiss Brothers (State Rights)
- Release date: April 6, 1924
- Running time: 6 reels; 56 minutes
- Country: United States
- Language: Silent (English intertitles)

Rough Ridin' is a lost 1924 American silent Western film directed by Richard Thorpe and starring Buddy Roosevelt. It was released by the Weiss Brothers on State Rights basis. The film was remade with Buddy Roosevelt in 1934 as Boss Cowboy.

== Plot ==
As described in a film magazine review, Buddy Benson's sweetheart, Rosalind, has been completely spoiled by attendance at an Eastern finishing school. She returns to the ranch jointly owned by her father and Buddy. Buddy, disillusioned, becomes enamored of Mary Ross, whose brother Dick owns the adjoining ranch. Dick's forieman, Jack Wells, is a cattle thief. Wells kills a man and fastens the guilt on Dick, demanding Mary as the price of his silence. Buddy disposes of Wells in a satisfactory fight, winning the friendship of Dick and the love of Mary.

== Cast ==
- Buddy Roosevelt as Buddy Benson
- Elsa Benham as Mary Ross
- Richard Thorpe as Dick Ross
- Joe Rickson as Jack Wells
- Frances Beaumont as Rosalind Nolan
- Arthur Detlorf as Tubby
- Mike Ready as Nolan

== Preservation ==
With no prints of Rough Ridin' located in any film archives, it is a lost film.
