= Galloping Fury =

1927 film

- Directed by: B. Reeves Eason
- Written by: Arthur Statter; Tom Reed
- Based on: a short story Tidy Toreador by Peter B. Kyne
- Produced by: Carl Laemmle
- Starring: Hoot Gibson
- Cinematography: Harry Neumann
- Distributed by: Universal Pictures
- Release date: November 20, 1927
- Running time: 60 minutes
- Country: United States
- Languages: Silent; English intertitles

Galloping Fury is a lost 1927 American silent Western film directed by B. Reeves Eason and starring Hoot Gibson. It was produced and distributed by Universal Pictures.

== Cast ==
- Hoot Gibson - Billy Halen
- Otis Harlan - Pop Tully
- Sally Rand - Dorothy Shelton
- Frank Beal - Jasper Thornby
- Gilbert Holmes - Pee Wee
- Max Asher - Freckles Watson
- Edward Coxen - James Gordon - Ranch Foreman
- Duke R. Lee - Henchman
