= Scotty Mattraw =

American actor (1880–1946)

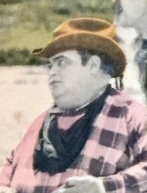
- Mattraw in 1928
- Born: Winfield Scott Mattraw; October 19, 1880; Black River, New York, U.S.
- Died: November 9, 1946 (aged 66); Hollywood, California, U.S.
- Resting place: Inglewood Park Cemetery
- Occupation: Actor
- Years active: 1924–1946

Winfield Scott Mattraw (October 19, 1880 – November 9, 1946) was an American actor. He provided the voice of Bashful in Walt Disney's Snow White and the Seven Dwarfs.

== Early life ==
The son of William Henry and Philamon Dano Mattraw, Winfield Scott Mattraw was born in Black River, New York, on October 19, 1880. His father farmed and worked for the New York Air Brake company. Mattraw was educated in Black River schools. His early employment included driving for American Express Company.

== Career ==
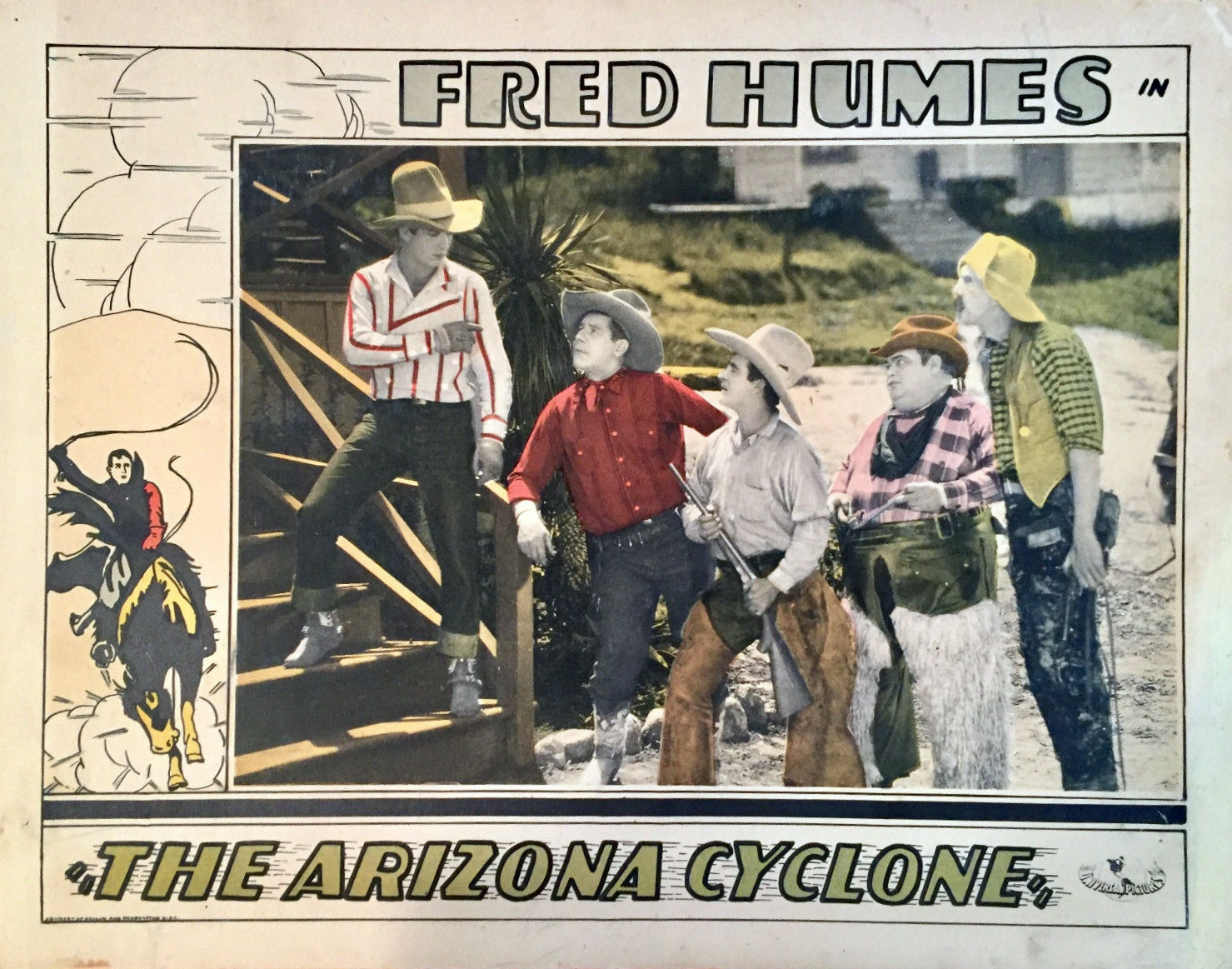
Lobby card for ''The Arizona Cyclone'' (1928) with Mattraw second from the right

Mattraw was already a comedian and a theatrical promoter and manager when, at age 27, he became manager of the City Opera House in Watertown, New York. He held that job for 12 years. He left his position with the opera house after it was sold, with the new owners planning to convert the theater into a venue for films. He started Scotty's Eatable Eats in February 1920, but financial problems led to its closing by the summer of 1922. He started a coffee shop and confectionery in December 1922, but it went out of business in less than four months.

Mattraw went to Hollywood in 1923 to begin working in films. One of his early film efforts was portraying the sheriff in a Western comedy in 1923. Later that year he had a lead comedy role in The Thief of Bagdad for the Douglas Fairbanks Picture Company. Mattraw primarily gained roles that suited his incredible size, and also was selected by Walt Disney to voice Bashful the Dwarf in their critically acclaimed feature film, Snow White and the Seven Dwarfs, which was his most memorable role of his career. Mattraw was and remains uncredited for the role in Snow White due to early standard that voice actors were rarely credited for their roles in cartoons.

== Personal life and death ==
Mattraw married Edna Hunter on June 25, 1903. They had a son and two daughters. The house he owned in Watertown was sold in July 1925 under a mortgage foreclosure judgment, and financial problems led to his filing a petition for bankruptcy in Los Angeles in the fall of 1926. He died from a heart attack on November 9, 1946, at the age of 66 at his home in Hollywood, California.

== Partial filmography ==
- Le Voleur de Bagdad (1924) – Eunuch (uncredited)
- The Lucky Lady (1926) (uncredited)
- The Red Mill (1927) – Cook (uncredited)
- The Return of the Riddle Rider (1927) – Willie
- The Border Cavalier (1927)
- A Made-To-Order Hero (1927) – Scotty
- One Glorious Scrap (1927) – Scotty
- Two Lovers (1928) – Dandermonde Innkeeper
- Haunted Island (1928)
- The Arizona Cyclone (1928) – Scotty
- Quick Triggers (1928) – Scotty
- Captain Cowboy (1929)
- The Merry Frinks (1934) – Fat Man (uncredited)
- One More River (1934) – Juryman (uncredited)
- Babes in Toyland (1934) – Town Crier (uncredited)
- Okay Toots! (1935) – Mr. Jones – Fat Man at Party (uncredited)
- George White's 1935 Scandals (1935) – Fat Man (uncredited)
- Escapade (1935) – Cab Driver (uncredited)
- Private Number (1936) – Houseman (uncredited)
- Under Your Spell (1936) – Sponsor (uncredited)
- Wee Willie Winkie (1937) – Merchant (uncredited)
- Snow White and the Seven Dwarfs (1937) – Bashful (voice, uncredited)
- In Old Chicago (1937) – Beef King
- The Grapes of Wrath (1940) – Migrant (uncredited)
- One Hour in Wonderland (1950) Bashful – (voice)
