= One Glorious Scrap =

1927 film

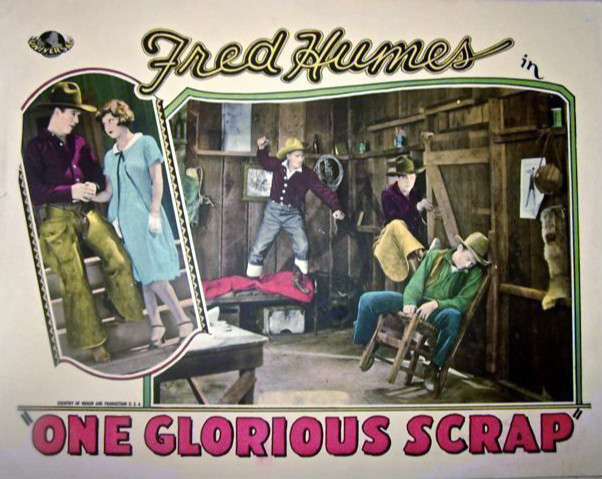
- Lobby card
- Directed by: Edgar Lewis
- Screenplay by: George H. Plympton; George Morgan; Gardner Bradford
- Story by: Leigh Jason
- Starring: Fred Humes; Dorothy Gulliver; Robert McKenzie; Francis Ford; George B. French; Cuyler Supplee
- Cinematography: Edward Linden
- Production company: Universal Pictures
- Distributed by: Universal Pictures
- Release date: November 20, 1927
- Running time: 50 minutes
- Country: United States
- Languages: Silent; English intertitles

One Glorious Scrap is a 1927 American silent Western film directed by Edgar Lewis and written by George H. Plympton, George Morgan, and Gardner Bradford. The film stars Fred Humes, Dorothy Gulliver, Robert McKenzie, Francis Ford, George B. French and Cuyler Supplee. The film was released on November 20, 1927, by Universal Pictures.

== Cast ==
- Fred Humes as Larry Day
- Dorothy Gulliver as Joan Curtis
- Robert McKenzie as Professor Parkinson
- Francis Ford as Ralph Curtis
- George B. French as Ezra Kramer
- Cuyler Supplee as Carl Kramer
- Ben Corbett as Benny
- Gilbert Holmes as Pee Wee
- Richard L'Estrange as Lazy
- Scotty Mattraw as Scotty
