= A Western Demon =

1922 American silent Western film

- Directed by: Robert McKenzie
- Produced by: F.M. Sanford
- Starring: William Fairbanks; Marilyn Mills; Monte Montague
- Cinematography: Edgar Lyons
- Production company: Western Feature Productions
- Release date: 1922 (US)
- Running time: 5 reels
- Country: United States
- Languages: Silent; English intertitles

A Western Demon is a 1922 American silent Western film directed by Robert McKenzie. The film stars William Fairbanks, Marilyn Mills, and Monte Montague. The film was restored by The Film Foundation and the Academy of Motion Picture Arts and Sciences Film Archive.

== Plot ==
Ned Underwood rescues a drowning child and in doing so, catches the eye of Rose Dale. Rose finds that Ned is a passenger on the same train headed west. In speaking with Ned, Rose tells him of rustling happening on her ranch, after which Ned offers to go undercover as a dishwasher at the ranch to find out about the rustlers. Joe Dalton, the ranch foreman, is trying to gain the ranch for himself by scaring Rose away.

== Cast ==
- William Fairbanks as Ned Underwood
- Marilyn Mills as Rose Dale
- Monte Montague as Joe Dalton
- Murray Miller as The bandit
- Billy Franey as The cook
