= Edgar Lewis (director) =

American actor, film director and screenwriter (1875–1938)

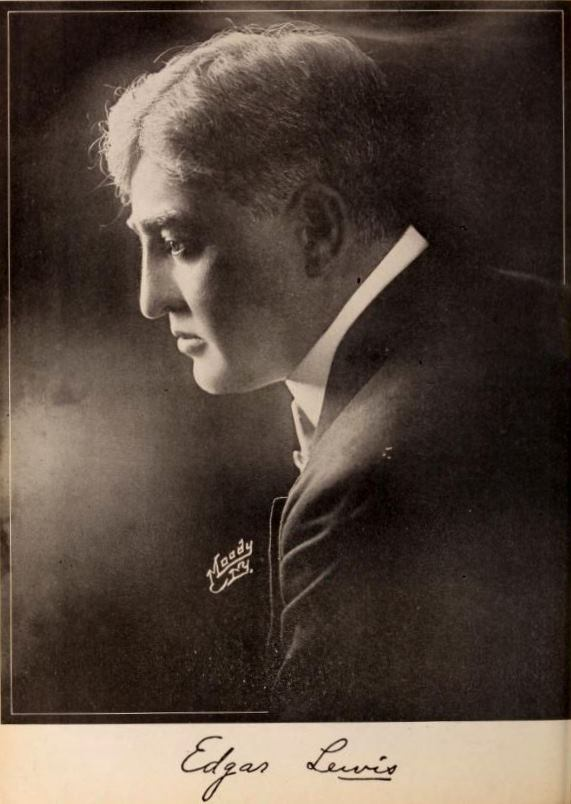
- Born: 1869 / 1875
- Died: 21 May 1938 (aged 68); Los Angeles, California

Edgar Lewis (c. 1875 – May 21, 1938) was an American film director. Two of his most famous films were The Great Divide (1925) and The Barrier (1926). He directed early silent films starring Douglas Fairbanks, William Farnum, Mary Pickford, and Norma Talmadge.

== Career ==
He began his career as a stage actor and entered the film industry in 1911 as an actor, making his directorial debut two years later. Specializing in action-adventure films and westerns, he directed dozens of pictures between 1913 and 1930, when he left directing and returned to his first love, acting. Most of his films during the sound era were in bit parts or uncredited roles. He appeared in his final film, Riding Wild.

He retired in 1935. He died in Los Angeles in 1938.

== Partial filmography ==
- The Thief (1914)
- The Nigger (1915) also known as The Governer and The New Governor
- The Country Boy (1915)
- Samson (1915)
- The Plunderer (1915)
- The Bondman (1916)
- Sherry (1920)
- Lahoma (1920)
- A Beggar in Purple (1920)
- Other Men's Shoes (1920)
- The Sage Hen (1921)
- Strength of the Pines (1922)
- You Are Guilty (1923)
- The Right of the Strongest (1924)
- Red Love (1925)
- A Made-To-Order Hero (1927)
- One Glorious Scrap (1927)
- The Fearless Rider (1928)
- Put 'Em Up (1928)
- The Arizona Cyclone (1928)
- Stormy Waters (1928)
- Life's Crossroads (1928)
- The Gun Runner (1928)
- Unmasked (1929)
- Love at First Sight (1929)
- Ladies in Love (1930)
