= Elsa Benham =

American actress (1908–1995)

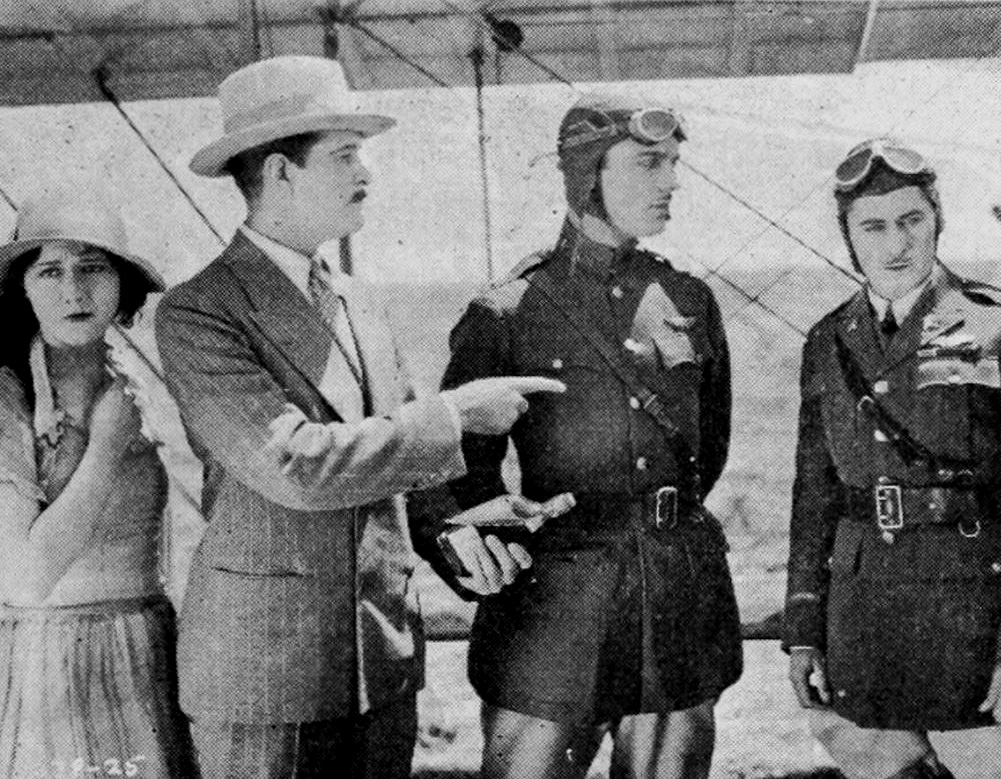
- Still from The Air Patrol (1928) with Benham at left
- Born: November 20, 1908; St. Louis, Missouri
- Died: April 20, 1995 (aged 86); Dallas, Texas
- Occupations: Film actress, dancer
- Spouse: Kenneth D. Neff

Elsa Benham (November 20, 1908 – April 20, 1995, Dallas, Texas) was a dancer and silent film actress.

== Early life ==
Benham was born in St. Louis, Missouri. She and her family moved to Hollywood during her early childhood.

== Career ==
Benham was Theodore Kosloff's dancing partner and was discovered by film director James Cruze as a member of the Kosloff Ballet when she performed in the film Hollywood (1923). Cruz signed her to a small part in a movie he was making. Her career progressed quickly as she secured roles in Dick Turpin (1925) with Tom Mix and The Phantom of the Opera (1925), which starred Mary Philbin and Lon Chaney.

In 1925 Benham won a popularity contest conducted by the West Hollywood Business Men's Association. It was entered by many film actresses. She was awarded a diamond ring for winning. Press reports compared her appearance to actress Barbara La Marr, though Benham was many years younger. Benham was about 5'2" in height, 110 lbs. with hazel eyes, and brown hair.

Benham had a brief tenure as a Hollywood actress. Most of her screen credits are in western films. Some of the titles are Fighting With Buffalo Bill (1926), Speeding Hoofs (1927), and Code of the Cow Country (1927).

She was married to Kenneth D. Neff.

== Filmography ==
- Rough Ridin' (1924)
- Dick Turpin (1925)
- The Phantom of the Opera (1925)
- Fighting with Buffalo Bill (1926)
- In Broncho Land (1926)
- Speeding Hoofs (1927)
- Western Courage (1927)
- The Two Fister (1927)
- Menace of the Mounted (1927)
- The Iron Rider (1927)
- Code of the Cow Country (1927)
- Speeding Hoofs (1927)
- The Air Patrol (1928)
