= The Winking Idol =

1926 film

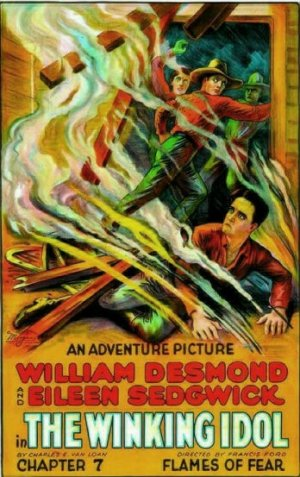
- Theatrical release poster
- Directed by: Francis Ford
- Written by: Arthur Henry Gooden; George Morgan; Charles E. van Loan
- Starring: William Desmond; Eileen Sedgwick
- Distributed by: Universal Pictures
- Release date: February 21, 1926
- Running time: 200 minutes (10 chapters, 20 reels)
- Country: United States
- Languages: Silent; English intertitles

The Winking Idol is a 1926 American silent Western film serial, consisting of 10 chapters, starring William Desmond and Eileen Sedgwick. Directed by Francis Ford, the screenplay was written by Arthur Henry Gooden, George Morgan and Charles E. van Loan. This serial was released by Universal Pictures and is considered to be a lost film.

== Cast ==
- William Desmond as Dave Ledbetter
- Eileen Sedgwick as Jean Wilson
- Jack Richardson as Crawford Lange
- Grace Cunard as Thora Lange
- Moravana as Komi
- Herbert Sutch as Jim Wilson
- Dorothy Gulliver
- Artie Ortego
- Helen Broneau
- Vanna Carroll
- Syd Saylor as Les Sailor

== Chapters ==
1. The Eye Of Evil
2. Buzzards' Roost
3. Crashing Timbers
4. Racing for Love
5. The Vanishing Bride
6. The Torrent of Terror
7. Flames of Fear
8. The Fight at the Falls
9. In the Danger of Dynamite
10. The Lost Lode

== See also ==
- List of film serials
- List of film serials by studio
