= Caught Bluffing =

1922 film

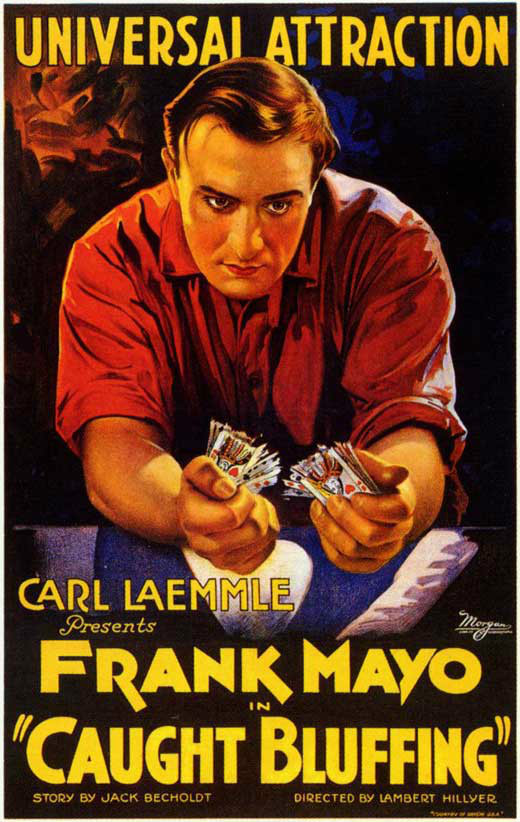
- Theatrical release poster
- Directed by: Lambert Hillyer
- Screenplay by: Charles Sarver
- Based on: Broken Chains by Jack Bechdolt
- Starring: Frank Mayo; Edna Murphy; Wallace MacDonald; Jack Curtis; Andrew Arbuckle; Ruth Royce
- Cinematography: Charles J. Stumar
- Production company: Universal Film Manufacturing Company
- Distributed by: Universal Film Manufacturing Company
- Release date: September 18, 1922
- Running time: 50 minutes
- Country: United States
- Language: Silent (English intertitles)

Caught Bluffing is a 1922 American drama film directed by Lambert Hillyer and written by Charles Sarver. The film stars Frank Mayo, Edna Murphy, Wallace MacDonald, Jack Curtis, Andrew Arbuckle, and Ruth Royce. The film was released on September 18, 1922, by Universal Film Manufacturing Company.

== Cast ==
- Frank Mayo as John Oxford
- Edna Murphy as Doris Henry
- Wallace MacDonald as Wallace Towers
- Jack Curtis as Pete Scarr
- Andrew Arbuckle as Ham Thomas
- Ruth Royce as College Kate
- Louis Durham as Siwash Sam
- Jack Walters as Wilk O'Malley
- Scott Turner as Jones
- Martin Best as Broome
- Tote Du Crow as Indian Guide
