= Put 'Em Up (film) =

1928 film

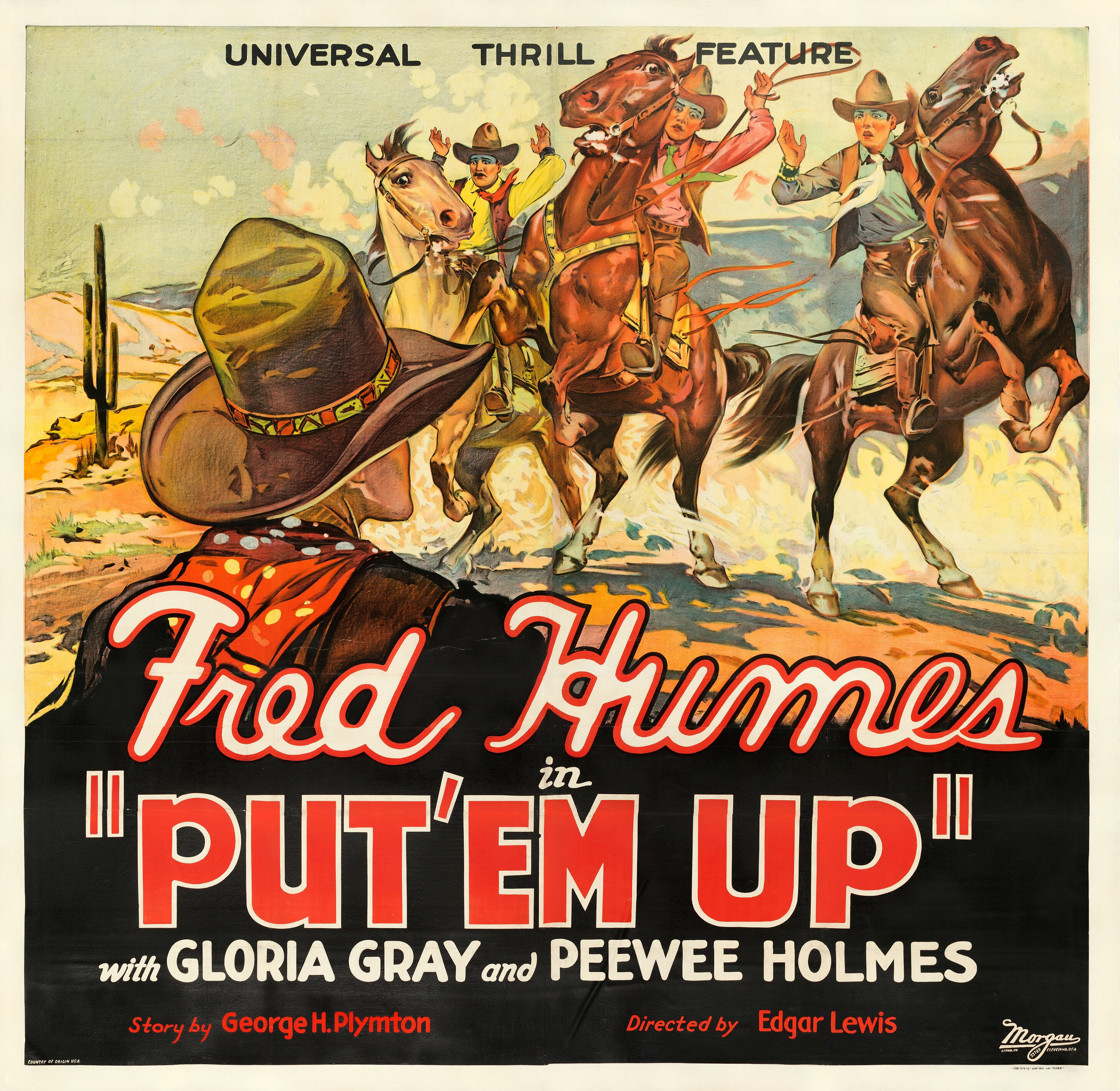
- Film poster
- Directed by: Edgar Lewis
- Written by: William Berke; Gardner Bradford; George H. Plympton
- Produced by: Carl Laemmle
- Starring: Fred Humes; Gloria Grey; Gilbert Holmes
- Cinematography: Wilfrid M. Cline
- Edited by: Harry Marker
- Production company: Universal Pictures
- Distributed by: Universal Pictures
- Release date: September 10, 1928
- Country: United States
- Languages: Silent; English intertitles

Put 'Em Up is a 1928 American silent Western film directed by Edgar Lewis and starring Fred Humes, Gloria Grey and Gilbert Holmes.

== Cast ==
- Fred Humes as Tom Evans
- Gloria Grey as Helen Turner
- Gilbert Holmes as Shorty Mullins
- Tom London as Jake Lannister
- Harry Semels as Lloyd Turner
- Ben Corbett as Tradin' Sam
- Charles Colby as Dobby Flinn
- Bert Starkey as Slim Hansom

== Bibliography ==
- Langman, Larry. American Film Cycles: The Silent Era. Greenwood Publishing Group, 1998.
