= Tundra (1936 film) =

1936 film

- Directed by: Norman Dawn
- Written by: Charles F. Royal; Norton S. Parker; Norman Dawn
- Produced by: Bennett Cohen; Norman Dawn; Ashton Dearholt; George W. Stout
- Starring: Merrill McCormick; Frank Baker; Earl Dwire
- Cinematography: Edward A. Kull; Jacob Kull; Norman Dawn
- Edited by: Thomas Neff; Walter Thompson
- Music by: Arthur Kay; Hugo Riesenfeld
- Production company: Burroughs-Tarzan Pictures
- Distributed by: Burroughs-Tarzan Pictures
- Release date: August 25, 1936
- Running time: 75 minutes
- Country: United States
- Language: English

Tundra is a 1936 American drama film directed by Norman Dawn and featuring Merrill McCormick, Frank Baker and Earl Dwire. Originally the film was backed by Universal Pictures, but it was dropped when Carl Laemmle lost control of the studio. Production and distribution was then taken over by the independent Burroughs-Tarzan Pictures. Seven months of location shooting took place in Alaska. The film's sets were designed by the art director Charles Clague. Footage from the film was later re-used for the 1949 RKO release Arctic Fury.

== Cast ==
- Alfred Delcambre as Dr. Jason Barlow
- Merrill McCormick as Mack - The Trapper
- Jack Santos as Kuyuk - Eskimo from Noonak
- Frank Baker as White Man from Noonak
- Earl Dwire as Trading Post Keeper
- Wally Howes as Trapper
- Elsie Duran as Sayuk's Mother
- Bertha Maldanado as Sayuk - Eskimo Child
- Frazer Acosta as Umnak - Sayuk's Father
