= Quick Triggers =

1928 film

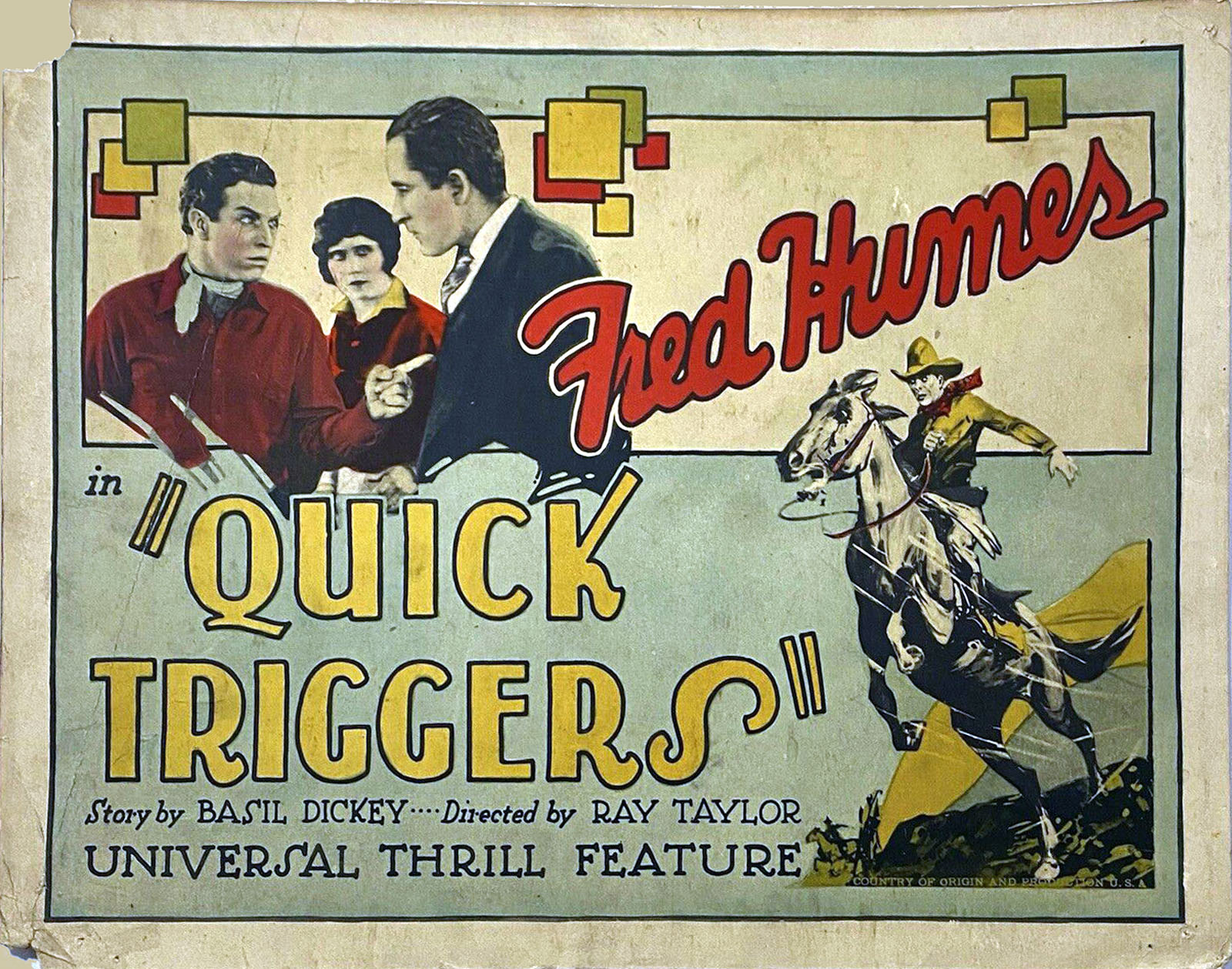
- Directed by: Ray Taylor
- Screenplay by: Basil Dickey; Gardner Bradford
- Story by: Basil Dickey
- Starring: Fred Humes; Derelys Perdue; Wilbur Mack; James Robert Chandler; Gilbert Holmes; Scotty Mattraw
- Cinematography: Alan Jones
- Edited by: Ben Pivar
- Production company: Universal Pictures
- Distributed by: Universal Pictures
- Release date: July 15, 1928
- Running time: 53 minutes
- Country: United States
- Languages: Silent; English intertitles

Quick Triggers is a 1928 American silent Western film directed by Ray Taylor and written by Basil Dickey and Gardner Bradford. The film stars Fred Humes, Derelys Perdue, Wilbur Mack, James Robert Chandler, Gilbert Holmes and Scotty Mattraw. The film was released on July 15, 1928, by Universal Pictures.

== Cast ==
- Fred Humes as Larry Day
- Derelys Perdue as Jeanne Landis
- Wilbur Mack as Jeff Thorne
- James Robert Chandler as Jake Landis
- Gilbert Holmes as Pee Wee
- Scotty Mattraw as Scotty
- Richard L'Estrange as Lazy
- Ben Corbett as Benny
