= Scar Hanan =

1925 film

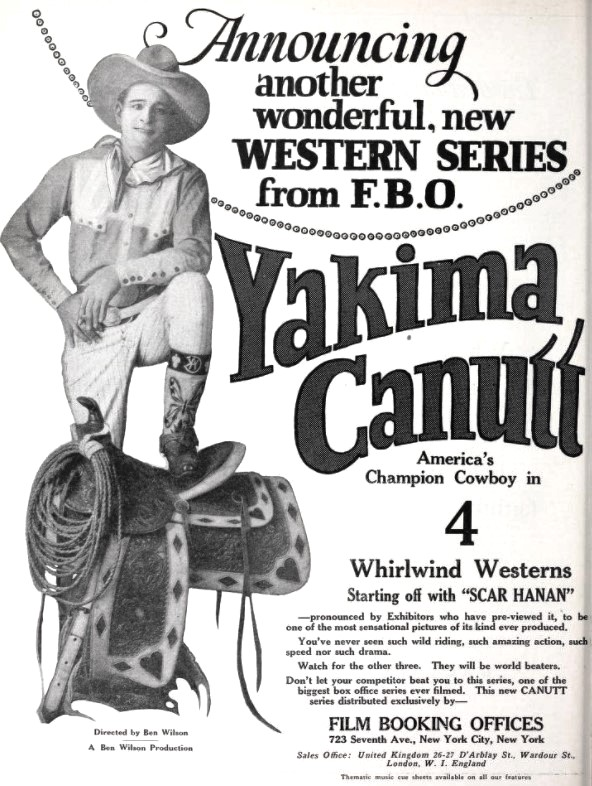
- Directed by: Ben F. Wilson; Edward Linden
- Written by: Yakima Canutt; George W. Pyper
- Produced by: Ben F. Wilson
- Starring: Yakima Canutt; Dorothy Wood; Helen Broneau
- Cinematography: Edward Linden
- Production company: Robertson-Cole Pictures Corporation
- Distributed by: Film Booking Offices of America; Ideal Films (UK)
- Release date: March 29, 1925
- Running time: 50 minutes
- Country: United States
- Languages: Silent; English intertitles

Scar Hanan is a 1925 American silent Western film directed by Edward Linden and Ben F. Wilson and starring Yakima Canutt, Dorothy Wood and Helen Broneau.

== Cast ==
- Yakima Canutt as Scar Hanan
- Dorothy Wood as Marian Fleming
- Helen Broneau as Julia Creighton
- Palmer Morrison as Dr. Crig Fleming
- Dick Hatton as Shorty
- George Lessey as Bart Hutchins
- Francis Ford as Jury foreman
- Art Walker as Sheriff
- Frank Baker as Edward Fitzhugh Carstowe
- Ben Wilson Jr. as Young Scar Hanan

== Bibliography ==
- Connelly, Robert B. The Silents: Silent Feature Films, 1910-36, Volume 40, Issue 2. December Press, 1998.
- Munden, Kenneth White. The American Film Institute Catalog of Motion Pictures Produced in the United States, Part 1. University of California Press, 1997.
