= Let 'er Buck =

1925 film directed by Edward Sedgwick

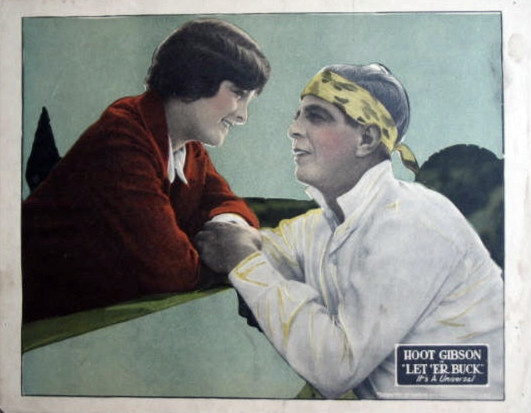
- Lobby card
- Directed by: Edward Sedgwick
- Written by: Edward Sedgwick (story, scenario); Raymond L. Schrock (story, scenario)
- Produced by: Carl Laemmle
- Starring: Hoot Gibson
- Cinematography: Virgil Miller
- Distributed by: Universal Pictures
- Release date: March 22, 1925
- Running time: 6 reels
- Country: United States
- Languages: Silent; English intertitles

Let 'er Buck is a 1925 American silent Western film directed by Edward Sedgwick and starring Hoot Gibson.

== Plot ==
As described in a review in a film magazine, Bob Carson (Gibson), working on Col. Jeff McCall's (French) ranch, is admired by Jacqueline McCall (Nixon). James Ralston (Nye), her cousin, is jealous. He fakes getting shot in a duel with Bob, who flees, finally reaching Pendleton, Oregon. There Kent Crosby (Steele), foreman of Mabel Thompson's (Sedgwick) ranch, knocks him down. Mabel comes along and accuses Bob of being a coward. Bob worsts Kent in a fight and wins Mabel's admiration by riding a dangerous bronco. She asks him to ride in the rodeo for her. Col. McCall, Jacqueline, and James arrive with their famous chariot team and are astonished to see Bob. Mabel sees that Bob is in love with Jacqueline and perplexes him by proposing. Bob then learns that he was duped by James in the duel. Kent and James kidnap Bob, but he escapes just as the chariot race is about to start. He drives Mabel's team and beats the Colonel's entry. Mabel sees that her love is not being returned and leaves when Bob and Jacqueline embrace.

== Cast ==
- Hoot Gibson as Bob Carson
- Marian Nixon as Jacqueline McCall
- Charles K. French as Col. Jeff McCall
- G. Raymond Nye as James Ralston
- William A. Steele as Kent Crosby
- Josie Sedgwick as Miss Mabel Thompson
- Fred Humes as Sheriff

== Production ==
Let 'er Buck was filmed near Pendleton, Oregon, and contains footage from the 1924 Pendleton Round-Up.

== Preservation ==
With no prints of Let 'er Buck located in any film archives, it is a lost film.

== See also ==
- Hoot Gibson filmography
