= The Vanishing Dagger =

1920 film

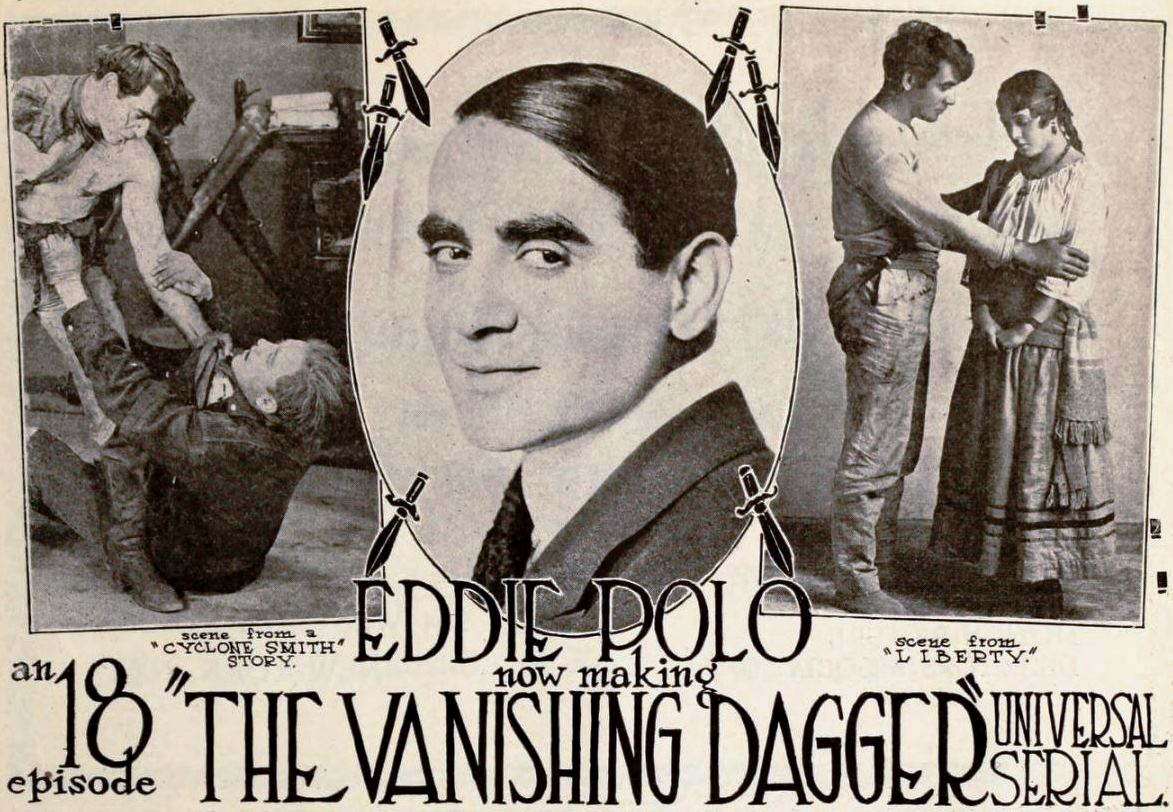
- Advertisement announcing the serial with stills from two other Eddie Polo films
- Directed by: Edward A. Kull; J. P. McGowan; Eddie Polo
- Written by: Jacques Jaccard; Hope Loring; Milton Moore; George W. Pyper
- Starring: Eddie Polo; Thelma Percy
- Cinematography: Edward A. Kull
- Distributed by: Universal Film Manufacturing Co.
- Release date: June 7, 1920
- Running time: 18 episodes
- Country: United States
- Language: Silent (English intertitles)

The Vanishing Dagger is a 1920 American adventure film serial directed by Edward A. Kull, J. P. McGowan, and Eddie Polo. It is presumed to be a lost film. Portions of this serial were filmed in England. The film had the working title The Thirteenth Hour.

== Cast ==
- Eddie Polo as John Edward Grant
- Thelma Percy as Elizabeth Latimer
- C. Norman Hammond as Sir George Latimer
- Laura Oakley as Lady Mary Latimer
- Ray Ripley as Prince Narr
- Karl Silvera as Prince Zan
- Ruth Royce as Sonia, Narr's Favorite
- Thomas G. Lingham as King Claypool
- Peggy O'Day as Nell (credited as Peggy O'Dare)
- Texas Watts as Len, Grant's Man
- Arthur Jarvis as Sir Richard Upton
- Leach Cross
- Leslie T. Peacocke
- J. P. McGowan

== Chapter titles ==
1. The Scarlet Confession
2. The Night of Terror
3. In Death's Clutches
4. On the Trail of the Dagger
5. The End of the Rustlers
6. A Terrible Calamity
7. Plunged to His Doom
8. In Unmerciful Hands
9. The Lights of Liverpool (a.k.a. Ferocious Foes)
10. When London Sleeps
11. A Race to Scotland
12. An Evil Plot
13. Spears of Death
14. Walls of Doom
15. The Great Pendulum
16. Beneath the Sea
17. Beasts of the Jungle
18. The Vanishing Dagger (a.k.a. Silver Linings)

== See also ==
- List of film serials
- List of film serials by studio
- List of lost films
