= Blood Test (film) =

1923 film

- Directed by: Don Marquis
- Starring: Dick Hatton; Nelson McDowell; Lafe McKee
- Cinematography: Ray Rennahan
- Edited by: Fred Bain
- Production company: Adventure Productions
- Distributed by: Aywon Film Corporation
- Release date: April 10, 1923
- Running time: 50 minutes
- Country: United States
- Languages: Silent; English intertitles

Blood Test is a 1923 American silent Western film directed by Don Marquis and starring Dick Hatton, Nelson McDowell and Lafe McKee.

== Cast ==
- Dick Hatton
- Nelson McDowell
- William F. Moran
- Lafe McKee
- Florence Lee
- Billie Bennett
- Les Bates
- Frank Rice
