= Speeding Hoofs =

1927 film

- Directed by: Louis Chaudet
- Produced by: Ben F. Wilson
- Starring: Dick Hatton; Elsa Benham; Ray Turner
- Cinematography: Edward Linden
- Production company: Ben Wilson Productions
- Distributed by: Rayart Pictures
- Release date: January 1927
- Running time: 50 minutes
- Country: United States
- Languages: Silent; English intertitles

Speeding Hoofs is a 1927 American silent Western film directed by Louis Chaudet and starring Dick Hatton, Elsa Benham and Ray Turner.

== Cast ==
- Dick Hatton as Richard Stanton
- Elsa Benham as Elsa McGuire
- Ray Turner as Tim Washington
- Roy Watson as Bill Travers
- Bud Osborne as Jack Richardson
- William Ryno as James McGuire
- Cliff Lyons as Henchman

== Bibliography ==
- Langman, Larry. A Guide to Silent Westerns. Greenwood Publishing Group, 1992.
