= The Empty Saddle =

1925 film

- Directed by: Harry S. Webb
- Written by: Forrest Sheldon
- Starring: Pete Morrison; Betty Goodwin; Bud Osborne
- Production company: Lariat Productions
- Distributed by: Vitagraph Company of America
- Release date: March 28, 1925
- Running time: 50 minutes
- Country: United States
- Languages: Silent; English intertitles

The Empty Saddle is a 1925 American silent Western film directed by Harry S. Webb and starring Pete Morrison, Betty Goodwin and Bud Osborne.

== Cast ==
- Pete Morrison as Bob Kingston
- Betty Goodwin as Mary Manning
- Bud Osborne
- Lew Meehan
- Ruth Royce
- Barney Furey
