= The Diamond Bandit =

1924 film

- Directed by: Francis Ford
- Written by: Francis Ford
- Produced by: Ben F. Wilson
- Starring: Ashton Dearholt; Florence Gilbert; Frank Baker
- Production company: Ben Wilson Productions
- Distributed by: Arrow Film Corporation
- Release date: October 15, 1924
- Running time: 50 minutes
- Country: United States
- Languages: Silent; English intertitles

The Diamond Bandit is a 1924 American silent Western film directed by Francis Ford and starring Ashton Dearholt, Florence Gilbert and Frank Baker.

== Synopsis ==
In South America mountain villagers are oppressed by a local commander. In response one of the locals takes up arms against him.

== Cast ==
- Ashton Dearholt as Pinto Pete
- Arthur George as Father Cantos
- Florence Gilbert as The Mission Waif
- Frank Baker as Jaspaz Lorenzo
- Robert F. McGowan as Lorenzo's Lieutenant
- Harry Dunkinson as Friar Michael
- Francis Ford as Friar Aloysius

== Preservation ==
With no holdings located in archives, The Diamond Bandit is considered a lost film.
