= Hard Fists =

1927 film

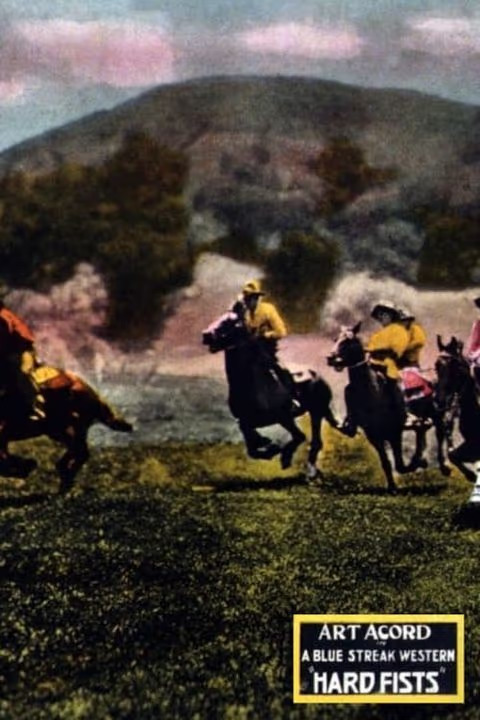
- Directed by: William Wyler
- Written by: William Berke; Charles A. Logue; George H. Plympton
- Produced by: Carl Laemmle
- Starring: Art Acord; Louise Lorraine; Gilbert Holmes
- Cinematography: Edward Linden
- Production company: Universal Pictures
- Distributed by: Universal Pictures
- Release date: April 24, 1927
- Running time: 50 minutes
- Country: United States
- Languages: Silent; English intertitles

Hard Fists is a 1927 American silent Western film directed by William Wyler and starring Art Acord, Louise Lorraine and Gilbert Holmes.

The film's sets were designed by the art director David S. Garber.

== Cast ==
- Art Acord as Art Alvord
- Louise Lorraine as Betty Barnes
- Gilbert Holmes as Jed Leach
- Albert J. Smith as Charles Crane
