= The Nigger =

Stage play by Edward Sheldon

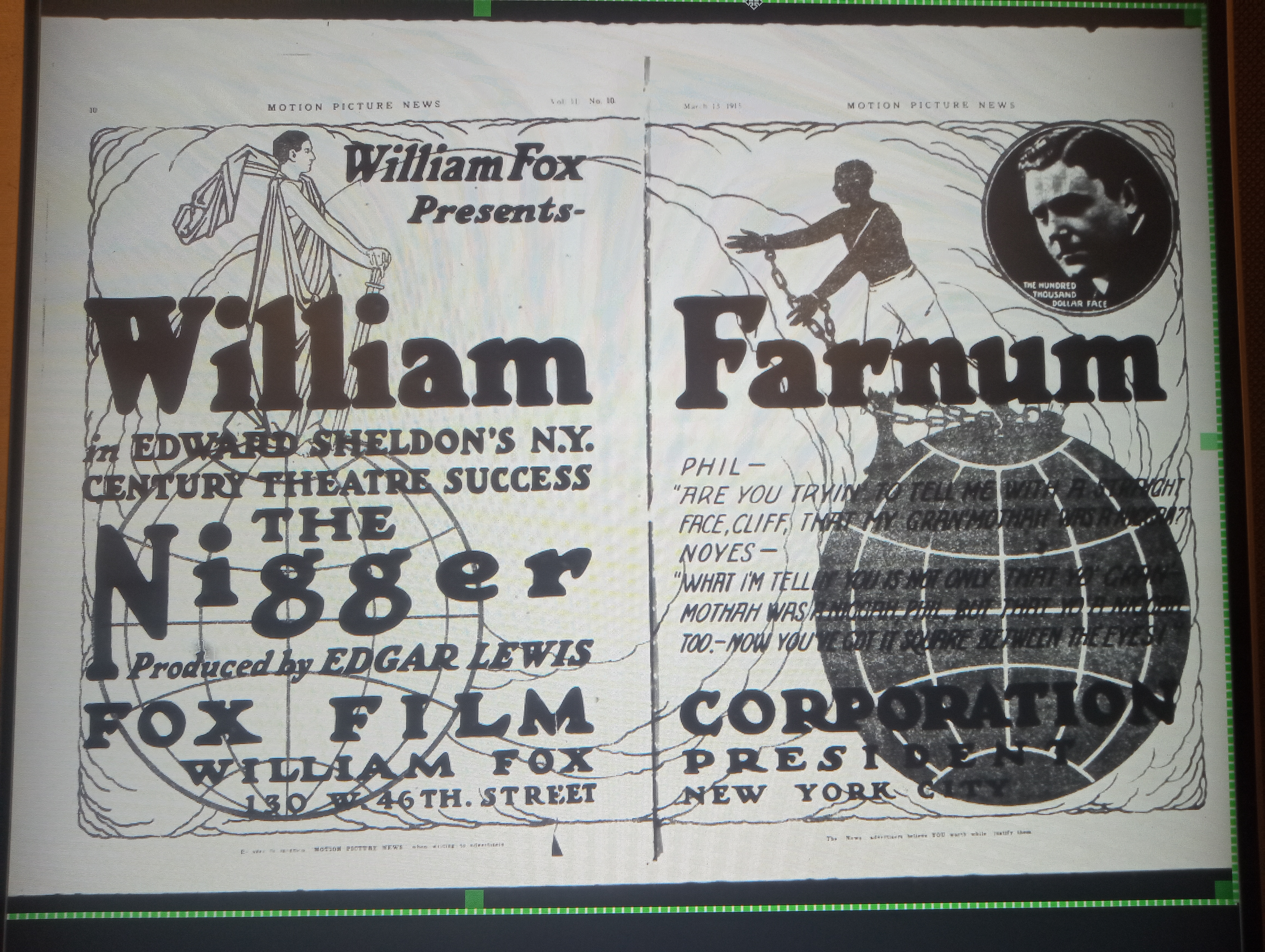
Advertisement for The Nigger in Motion Picture News, March 13, 1915

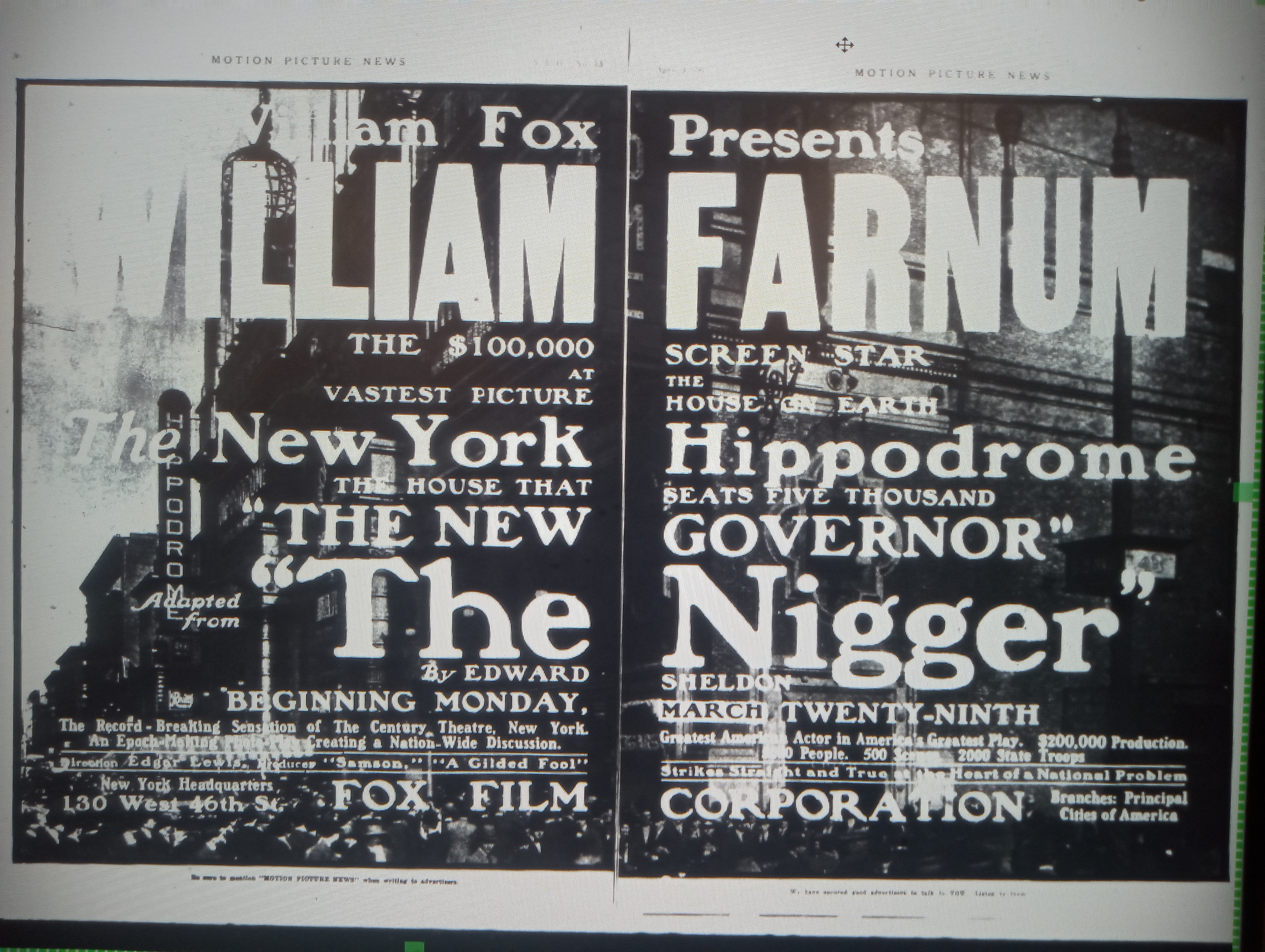
Advertisement for the New York premiere of The Nigger at The Hippodrome in Motion Picture News, April 3, 1915

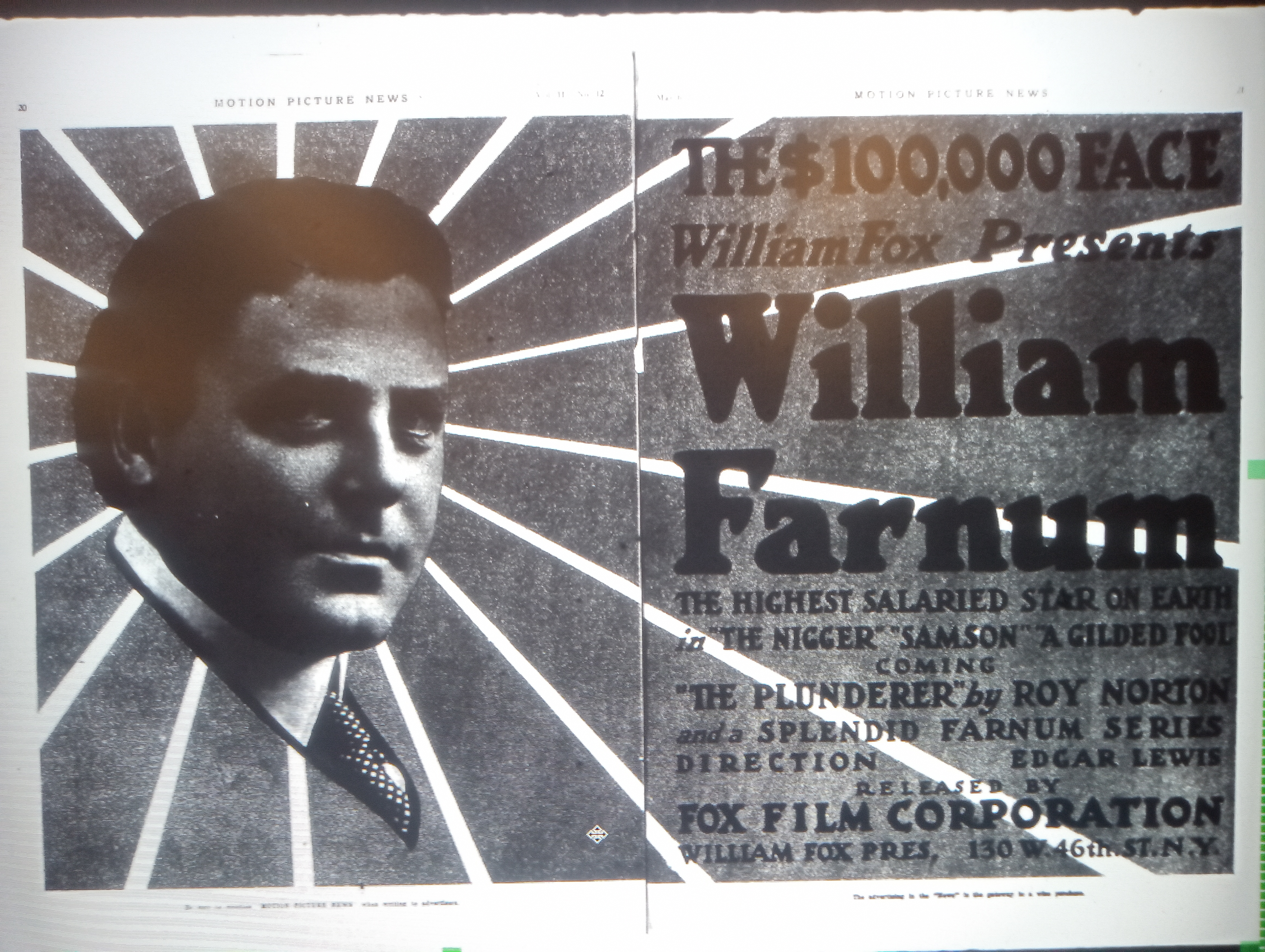
William Farnum two-page spread from Motion Picture News, March 1915

The Nigger is a play by American playwright Edward Sheldon (1886–1946). It explores the relationship between blacks and whites in the melodrama of a politician faced with a sudden, personal dilemma. The play was first performed on Broadway in New York City at the New Theatre on December 4, 1909. The play was adapted to a novel, and a film adaptation, directed by Edgar Lewis and starring William Farnum, was made in 1915. Because the title was controversial, the film was released in some markets as The Governor or The New Governor.

== Reception ==
The Moving Picture World, a leading film periodical of the day, judged the film as "a picture to be suppressed... Repulsive, harmful and void of any moral lesson worth pointing... It presents the worst sores in American civilization without any decency or restraint and without suggesting a remedy... Nothing so nauseating as The Nigger has been shown on the screen... it is a brutal appeal to the most dangerous of human passions and prejudices." Variety noted that "there are 'close up' views of a fiendish, mouth-frothing black about to take liberities with a white girl. Other scenes are reported as calculated to start racial prejudice against the negroes." The police attempted to prevent the film from being shown in Pittsburgh, Pennsylvania, which resulted in a title change to The New Governor. Citing the NAACP Collection at the Library of Congress, the American Film Institute says that the film's title change was enforced by the National Board of Review on March 20, 1915. Illinois House of Representatives member Robert R. Jackson sponsored a bill to keep this film, The Birth of a Nation, and others like it out of the state, which passed the House. The bill was killed in the state senate. A similar bill was defeated in Kansas City, attributed to the efforts of Charles W. Harden, manager of the Fox Film Corporation, which made The Nigger, and Martin E. Williams, manager of the Mutual Film Corporation, which released The Birth of a Nation.

Motion Picture News was more favorable: "a drama which handles unflinchingly one of the most important questions facing the people of every section of this country today. William Farnum, the $100,000 dramatic star, gives a sublime performance of the self-sacrificing hero Phil Morrow. Its recent engagement at the N. Y. Hippodrome smashed all records." "Cold figures and hard facts show conclusively that no attraction ever previously shown at the New York Hippodrome which has a seating capacity in excess of 5,000 beat the record set during the recent run of the much-discussed William Fox photoplay The New Governor adapted from Edward Sheldon's The Nigger. During its six-day run The New Governor attracted, in round numbers, 150,000 paid admissions, and the Box Office tally sheets show the receipts to have been $37,552.50. This is certainly 'striking thirteen.' The tremendous demand for The New Governor by exhibitors throughout the country has necessitated the engaging of an extra force in the offices of Manager Louis T. Rogers, in the Leavitt Building."

Frank Powell, another director at Fox, had this to say: "I have not words to express my views on the merits of this great picture. Your productions show very plainly that you reign supreme with plays, players and directors. Thousands of my patrons actually came back to see the picture three and four times. The public are fast getting wise to the name "William Fox" on a feature. Capacity business greeted William Farnum in The Nigger. I believe this is William Farnum's best to date."

The New York Dramatic Mirror called for what Richard Koszarski calls "strong and effective censorship"--"we give our daughters in their teens the harrowing Nigger".

== Survival status ==
The film is among the 7,200 American films from 1912 to 1929 considered lost.
