= Love at First Sight (1929 film) =

1929 film

- Directed by: Edgar Lewis
- Written by: Lester Lee; Charles Levison
- Starring: Norman Foster; Suzanne Keener; Doris Rankin
- Cinematography: Dal Clawson
- Edited by: Russell G. Shields
- Production company: Chesterfield Pictures
- Distributed by: Chesterfield Pictures
- Release date: May 26, 1929
- Running time: 71 minutes
- Country: United States
- Language: English

Love at First Sight is a 1929 American musical comedy film directed by Edgar Lewis and starring Norman Foster, Suzanne Keener and Doris Rankin.

== Cast ==
- Norman Foster as Richard Norton
- Suzanne Keener as June Vernon
- Doris Rankin as Mrs. Vernon
- Lester Cole as Paul Russell
- Abe Reynolds as Abe Feinstein
- Hooper Atchley as Frank Belmont
- Bert Matthews as Master of Ceremonies
- Dorothee Adam as 'Jig-a-boo' singer
- Jim Harkins

== Music ==
The film included the following songs: "Love at First Sight," "What Is Living Without You?," "Sunshine" and "Jig-a-Boo Jig" with words and music by Lester Lee and Charles Levison.

== See also ==
- Love at first sight
- List of early sound feature films (1926–1929)

== Bibliography ==
- Michael R. Pitts. Poverty Row Studios, 1929-1940: An Illustrated History of 55 Independent Film Companies, with a Filmography for Each. McFarland & Company, 2005.
