= Three Pals =

1926 film

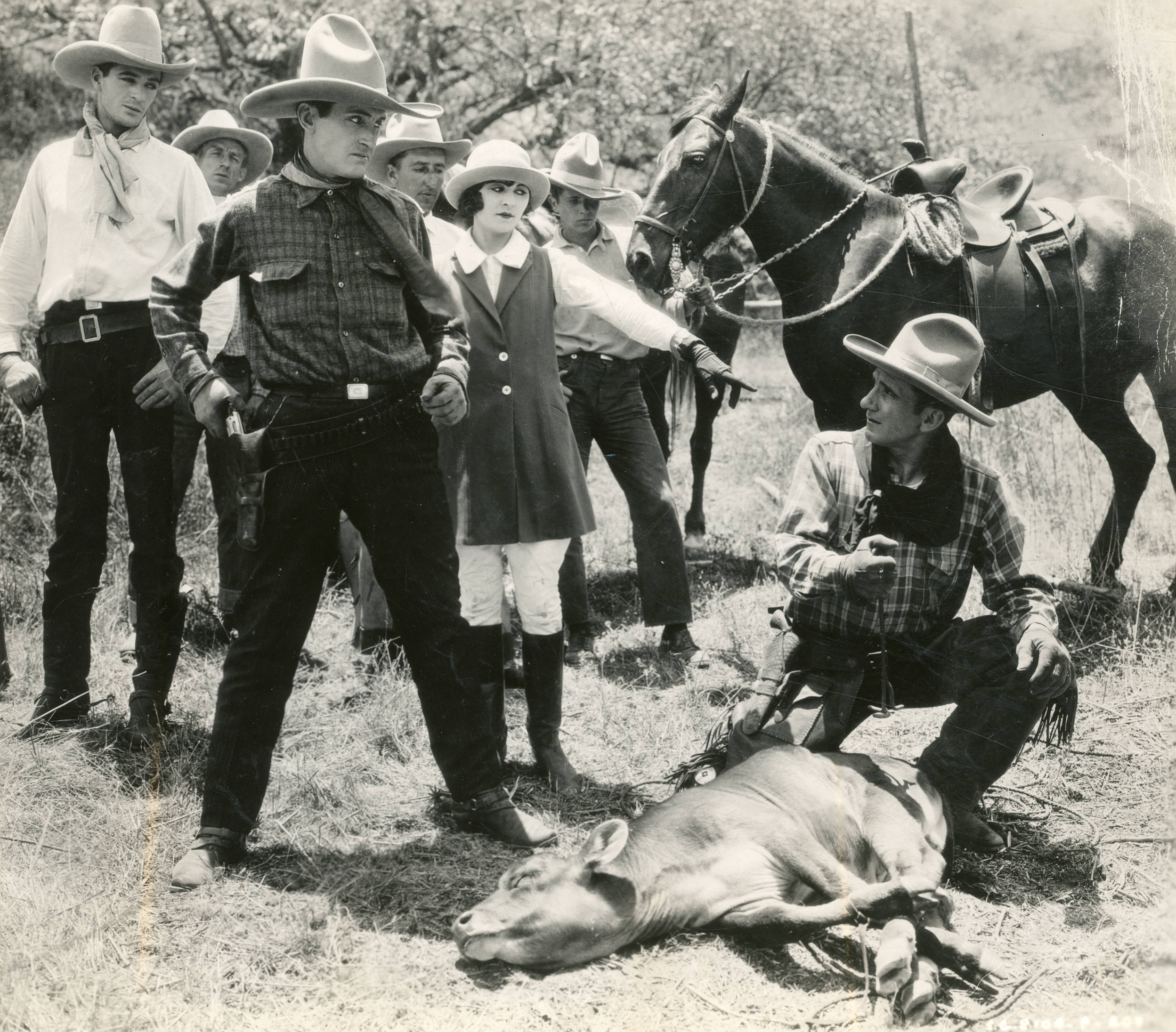
- Directed by: Wilbur McGaugh; Bruce Mitchell
- Written by: L. V. Jefferson
- Produced by: J. Charles Davis; J. Frank Glendon; Marilyn Mills
- Starring: Marilyn Mills; Josef Swickard; William H. Turner
- Cinematography: Robert De Grasse
- Production company: Marilyn Mills Productions
- Distributed by: Davis Distributing Division
- Release date: January 5, 1926
- Running time: 54 minutes
- Country: United States
- Languages: Silent; English intertitles

Three Pals is a 1926 American silent romance film directed by Wilbur McGaugh and Bruce Mitchell and starring Marilyn Mills, Josef Swickard and William H. Turner. Gary Cooper made one of his earliest screen appearances as an extra.

== Cast ==
- Marilyn Mills as Betty Girard
- Josef Swickard as Col. Girard
- William H. Turner as Maj. Wingate
- Martin Turner as Uncle Lude
- Ralph Emerson as Larry Wingate
- James McLaughlin as Wingate's Secretary
- Gary Cooper as Car Driver Flirting with Betty

== Preservation status ==
The film is preserved in the Library of Congress collection.

== Bibliography ==
- Munden, Kenneth White. The American Film Institute Catalog of Motion Pictures Produced in the United States, Part 1. University of California Press, 1997.
