= Fighting with Buffalo Bill =

1926 film

Fighting With Buffalo Bill
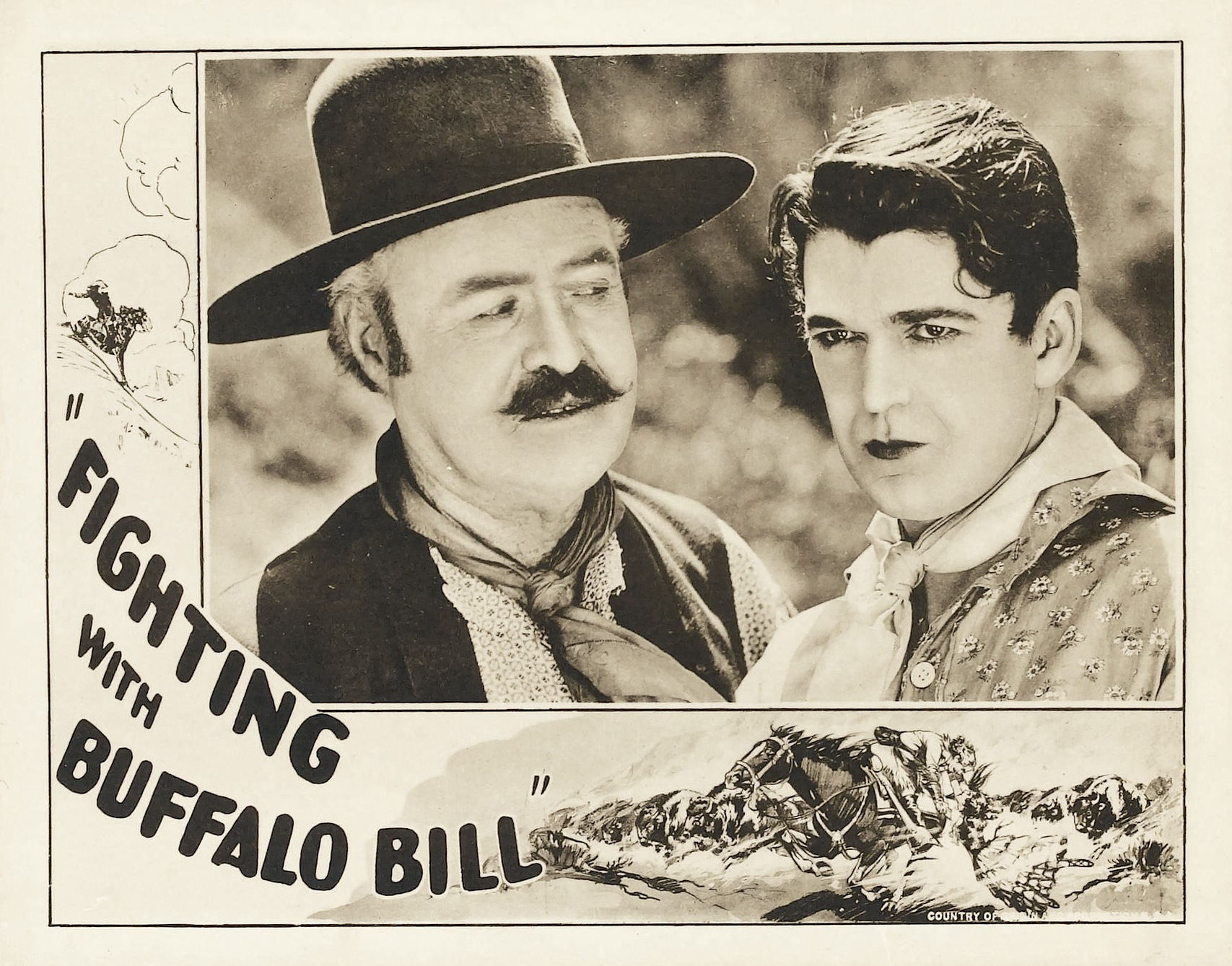
- Lobby card
- Directed by: Ray Taylor
- Written by: William F. Cody; George H. Plympton; William Lord Wright
- Starring: Wallace MacDonald; Elsa Benham
- Distributed by: Universal Pictures
- Release date: August 30, 1926
- Country: United States
- Languages: Silent; English intertitles

Fighting With Buffalo Bill is a 1926 American silent Western film serial directed by Ray Taylor for Universal Pictures. The film is now considered to be lost.

== Cast ==
- Wallace MacDonald as Ned Wheeler
- Elsa Benham as Doris Carberry
- Edmund Cobb as Buffalo Bill Cody
- Robert Homans as Caleb Crosby
- Cuyler Supplee as Bart Crosby
- Grace Cunard as Lola
- Howard Truesdale as Carberry
- Nelson McDowell as Lem Brady
- Harry Blake as The Boy

== Chapter titles ==
1. Westward
2. The Red Menace
3. The Blazing Arrow
4. The Death Trap
5. The Renegade
6. The Race for Life
7. Buried Alive
8. Desperate Chances
9. The Shadow of Evil
10. At the End of the Trail

== See also ==
- List of American films of 1926
- List of film serials
- List of film serials by studio
- List of lost films
- In the Days of Buffalo Bill (1922)
- With Buffalo Bill on the U. P. Trail (1926)
