= Points West (film) =

1929 film

- Directed by: Arthur Rosson
- Written by: Rowland Brown; Harold Tarshis (titles)
- Based on: Points West by B. M. Bower
- Produced by: Carl Laemmle
- Starring: Hoot Gibson
- Cinematography: Harry Neuman
- Distributed by: Universal Pictures
- Release date: August 25, 1929
- Running time: 60 minutes
- Country: United States
- Language: Silent (English intertitles)

Points West is a 1929 American silent Western film directed by Arthur Rosson and starring Hoot Gibson. It was produced and distributed by Universal Pictures and is based on the novel of the same name by B. M. Bower.

== Plot ==
As described in a film magazine, Cole Lawson Jr. inherits a spread with alfalfa when his father is murdered. Cole finds a letter left by his father who had been secretly informed that his murder was about to take place, and which discloses that his son should get McQuade, an ex-convict who is tough and stops at nothing. Cole then poses as a horse thief and tolls up to McQuade's stronghold. To complicate things, there he falls in love with Dorothy, who is set to be married to McQuade.

== Cast ==
- Hoot Gibson as Cole Lawson Jr.
- Alberta Vaughn as Dorothy
- Frank Campeau as McQuade
- Jack Raymond as His Nibs
- Martha Franklin as Mrs. Cole Lawson
- Milt Brown as Parsons
- Jim Corey as Steve
- Buck Bucko as Henchman (uncredited)
- Roy Bucko as Henchman (uncredited)
- Fred Burns as Rancher (uncredited)
- Gilbert Holmes as Ranch Hand (uncredited)
- Fred Humes as Ranch Hand (uncredited)
- Cliff Lyons as Ranch Hand (uncredited)
- Skeeter Bill Robbins as Ranch Hand (uncredited)

== Preservations ==
A print of Points West is listed as surviving, but no archive listed, in the Library of Congress / FIAF database.
