= Dick Hatton =

American actor (1891–1931)

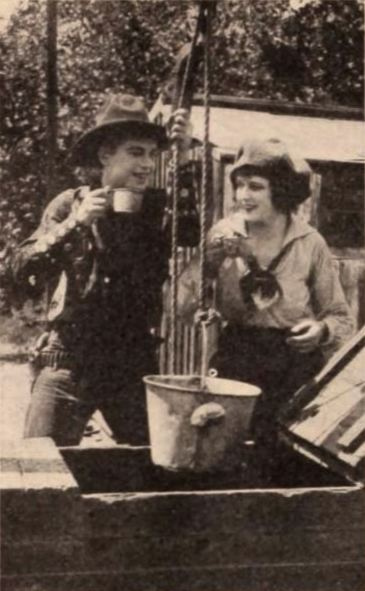
Still from the American western film Fearless Dick (1922) starring Dick Hatton and Catherine Craig that appears on page 70 of the October 1, 1921 Exhibitors Herald

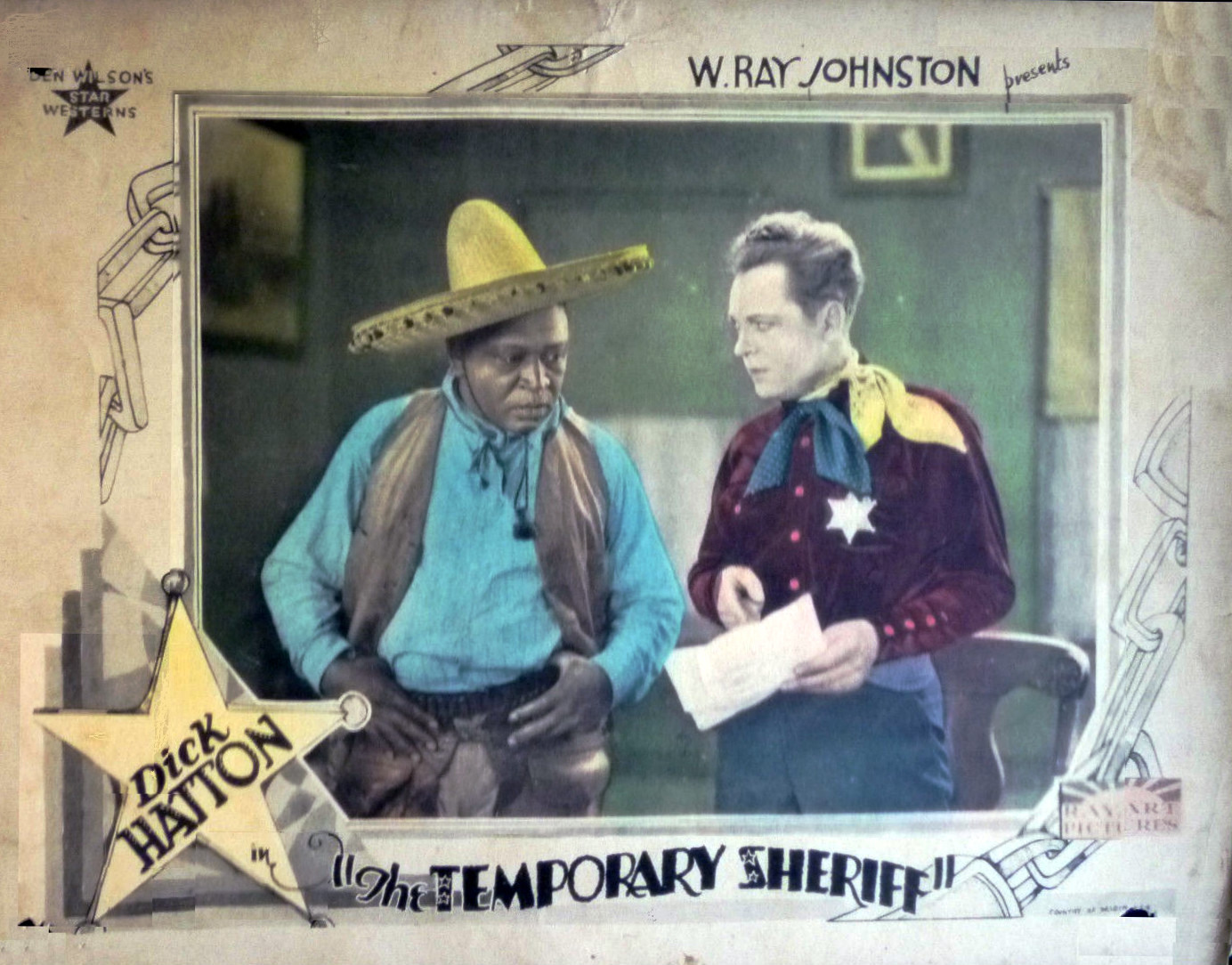
Lobby card for Rayart Picture's film The Temporary Sheriff starring Dick Hatton

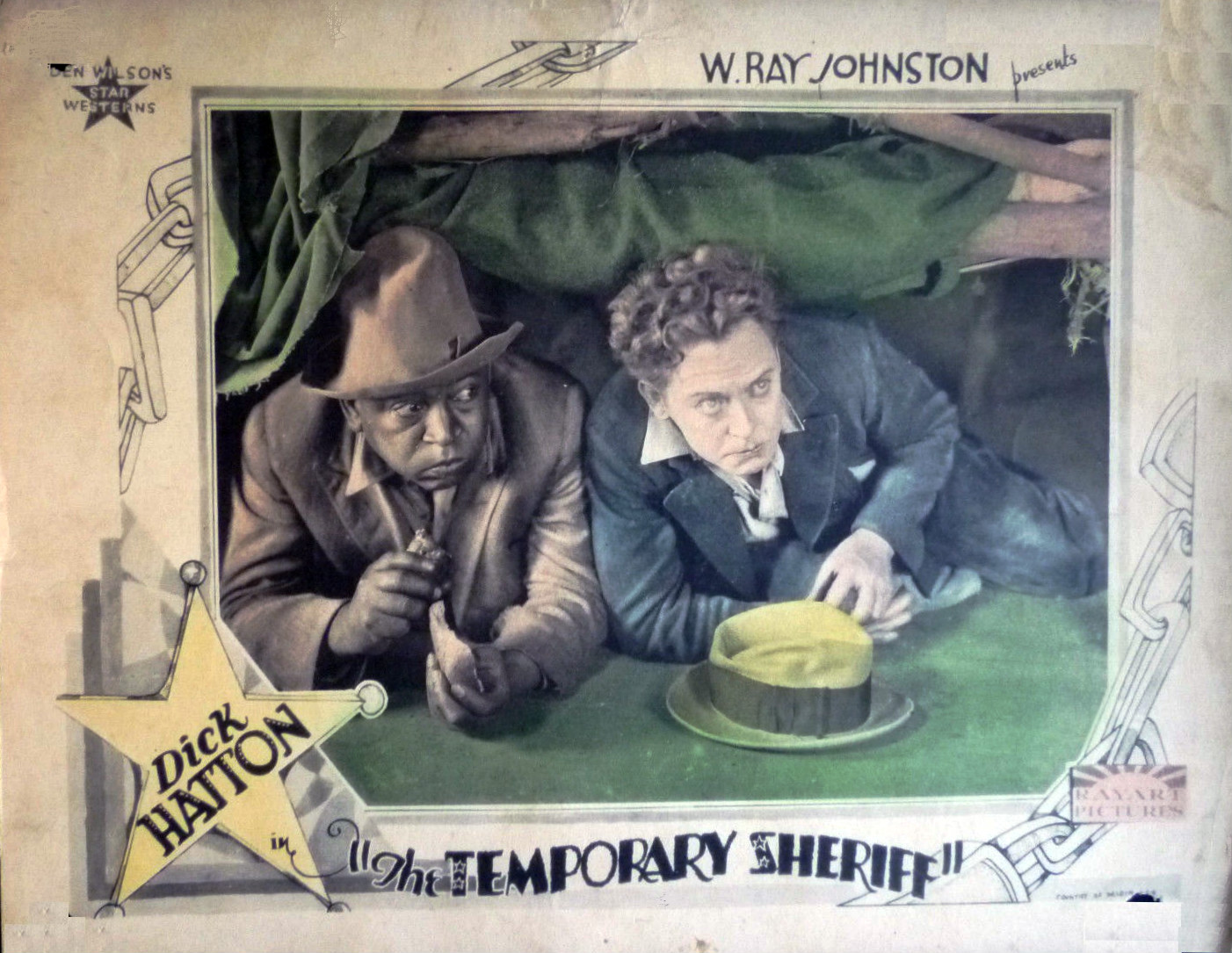
Lobby card for Rayart Picture's film The Temporary Sheriff starring Dick Hatton

Dick Hatton (born Clarence Edward Hatton, 1891 - July 9, 1931) was an American actor in silent films, "a character actor in low-grade Westerns". He had leading roles in productions from various studios including Arrow Pictures and Rayart Pictures films including Temporary Sheriff.

Hatton was born Clarence Edward Hatton in Lexington, Kentucky, in 1891. He was the son of Mr. and Mrs. James Hatton, and he had three brothers and two sisters. At age 16, he moved from Lexington to Los Angeles.

Hatton worked for independent companies, making action-filled films that were popular in smaller theaters in rural areas. His first film was The Rose of Wolfville (1916) for Vitagraph. Early in his career he was billed as C. Edward Hatton. He also directed films. In 1921, he began producing films.

He died on July 9, 1931, at age 40 after an automobile accident in Los Angeles.

== Selected filmography ==
- Cactus Cure
- Two Fisted Justice (1924), an Arrow Pictures production
- Temporary Sheriff
- Fearless Dick (1922)
- Blood Test (1923)
- Where Romance Rides (1925)
- Scar Hanan (1925)
- Tonio, Son of the Sierras (1925)
- Speeding Hoofs (1927)
- Western Courage (1927)
- The Boss of Rustler's Roost (1928)
- Romance of the West (1930)
