= Tricks (1925 film) =

1925 film

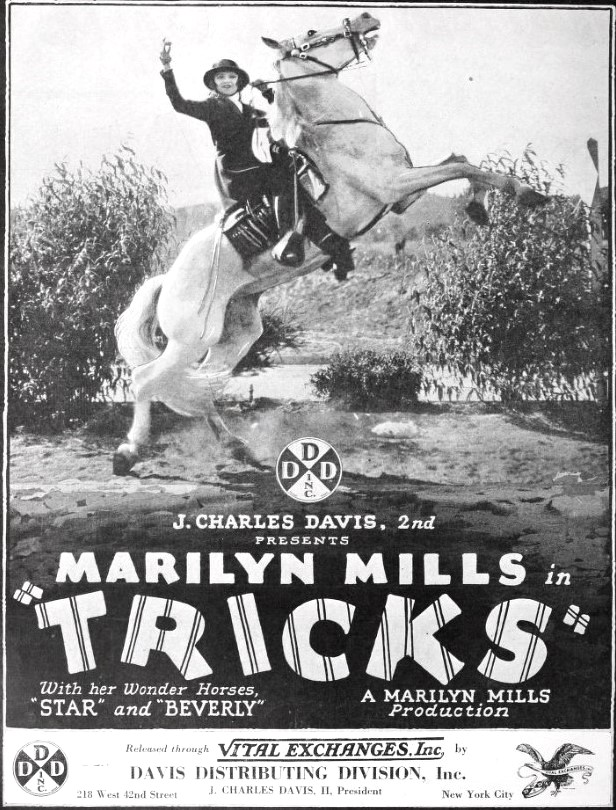
- Advertisement
- Directed by: Bruce Mitchell
- Written by: Marilyn Mills
- Produced by: J. Charles Davis; J. Frank Glendon; Marilyn Mills
- Starring: Marilyn Mills; J. Frank Glendon; Dorothy Vernon
- Cinematography: William S. Adams
- Production company: Marilyn Mills Productions
- Distributed by: Davis Distributing Division
- Release date: November 16, 1925
- Running time: 50 minutes
- Country: United States
- Language: Silent film (English intertitles)

Tricks is a 1925 American silent comedy Western film directed by Bruce Mitchell and starring Marilyn Mills, J. Frank Glendon, and Dorothy Vernon. Future star Gary Cooper appeared as an extra in one of his earliest film roles.

== Synopsis ==
College girl Angelica dreams of an adventure on her father's ranch. After being expelled she returns home and finds her dream about a gang of rustlers appears to be real.

== Cast ==
- Marilyn Mills as Angelica 'Trix' Varden
- J. Frank Glendon as New Foreman
- Gladys Moore as Aunt Angelica
- Miles McCarthy as William Varden
- Dorothy Vernon as Housekeeper
- William Lowery as Buck Barlow
- Beverly the Horse as Beverly
- Star the Horse as Star
- Gary Cooper as Bit Role

== Bibliography ==
- Connelly, Robert B. The Silents: Silent Feature Films, 1910-36, Volume 40, Issue 2. December Press, 1998.
- Munden, Kenneth White. The American Film Institute Catalog of Motion Pictures Produced in the United States, Part 1. University of California Press, 1997.
