= Chip of the Flying U (1926 film) =

1926 film

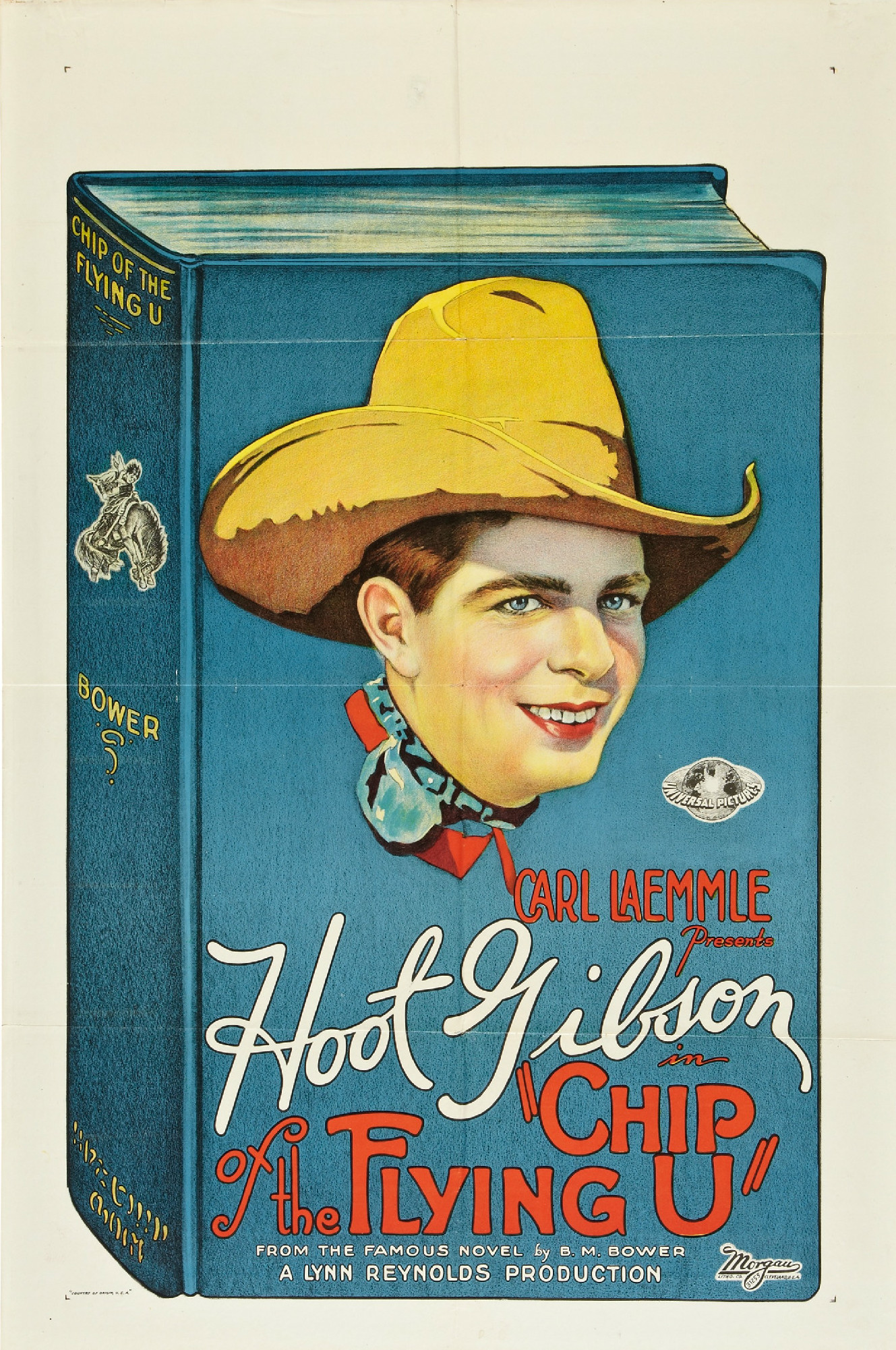
- Theatrical release poster
- Directed by: Lynn Reynolds
- Written by: Lynn Reynolds; Harry Ditmar
- Based on: Chip of the Flying U by Bertha Muzzy Sinclair
- Produced by: Carl Laemmle
- Starring: Hoot Gibson
- Cinematography: Harry Neumann
- Distributed by: Universal Pictures
- Release date: March 14, 1926
- Running time: 7 reels
- Country: United States
- Language: Silent (English intertitles)

Chip of the Flying U is a 1926 American silent Western comedy film based on a novel by Bertha Muzzy Sinclair. It was directed by Lynn Reynolds and starred Hoot Gibson. Universal Pictures produced and released the film.

== Plot ==
As described in a film magazine review, cowboy Chip Bennett of the Whitmore ranch is an amateur cartoonist but has a dread of women. However, he soon has a change of heart when he falls in love with pretty Doctor Della Whitmore, the sister of the ranch owner. His rival for her is rancher Duncan Whittaker. Della sends a sketch by Chip to a magazine, where it wins a prize. He fakes having an accident and she nurses him, but they quarrel when she discovers that he is not hurt. Chip, who is uninvited, attends a dance given by Whittaker and is then ordered to leave. He goes but carries off Della, who is perfectly willing to be abducted, and they drive to the parson to be wed.

== Cast ==
- Hoot Gibson as Chip Bennett
- Virginia Brown Faire as Dr. Della Whitmore
- Philo McCullough as Duncan Whittaker
- Nora Cecil as Dr. Cecil Grantham
- DeWitt Jennings as J. G. Whitmore
- Harry Todd as Weary
- Pee Wee Holmes as Shorty
- Mark Hamilton as Slim
- Willie Fung as Chinese Cook
- Steve Clements as Indian

== Preservation ==
A print of Chip of the Flying U is preserved at the UCLA Film & Television Archive.
