= The Sage Hen =

1921 film

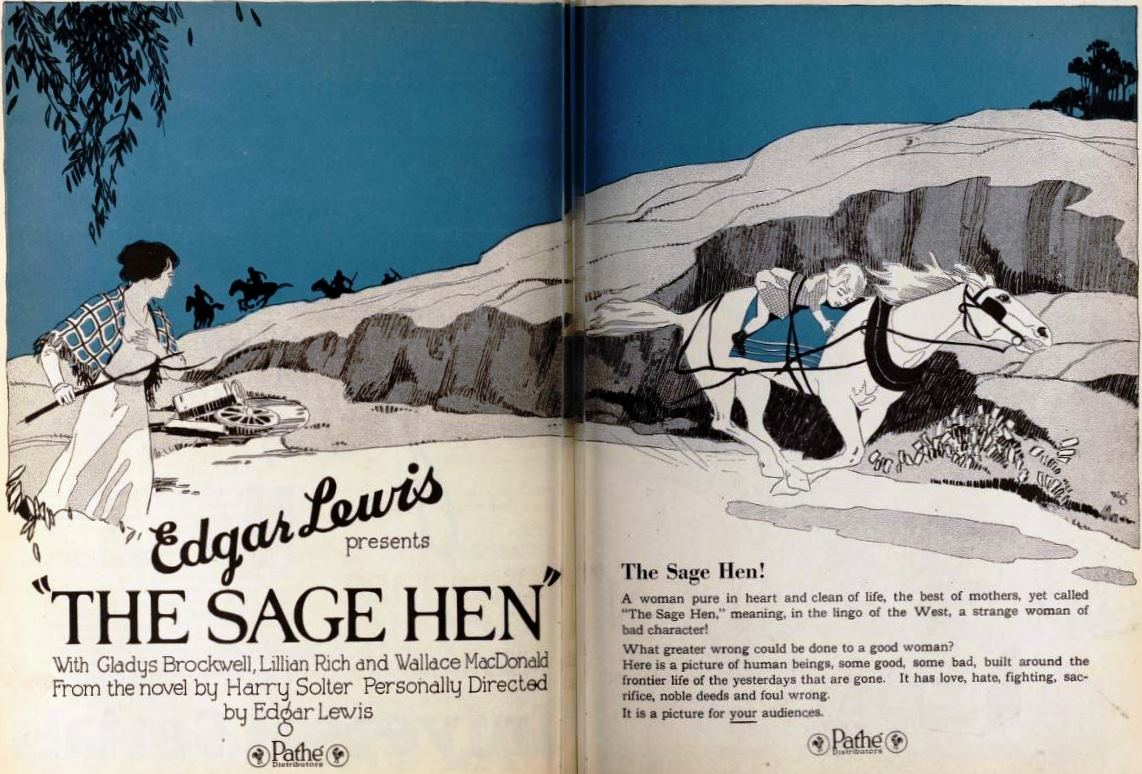
- Theatrical release poster
- Directed by: Edgar Lewis
- Written by: Harry Solter
- Produced by: Edgar Lewis
- Starring: Gladys Brockwell; Wallace MacDonald; Richard Headrick
- Cinematography: Ben Bail
- Production company: Edgar Lewis Productions
- Distributed by: Pathé Exchange
- Release date: January 1921
- Running time: 6 reels
- Country: United States
- Languages: Silent; English intertitles

The Sage Hen is a 1921 American silent Western film directed by Edgar Lewis and starring Gladys Brockwell, Wallace MacDonald, and Richard Headrick.

== Cast ==
- Gladys Brockwell as The Sage Hen
- Wallace MacDonald as Her Son, as a Man
- Richard Headrick as Her Son, as a Boy
- Lillian Rich as Stella Sanson
- Alfred Allen as John Rudd
- Jim Mason as Craney
- Arthur Morrison as Grote

== Bibliography ==
- George A. Katchmer. Eighty Silent Film Stars: Biographies and Filmographies of the Obscure to the Well Known. McFarland, 1991.
