= Marilyn Mills =

American actress

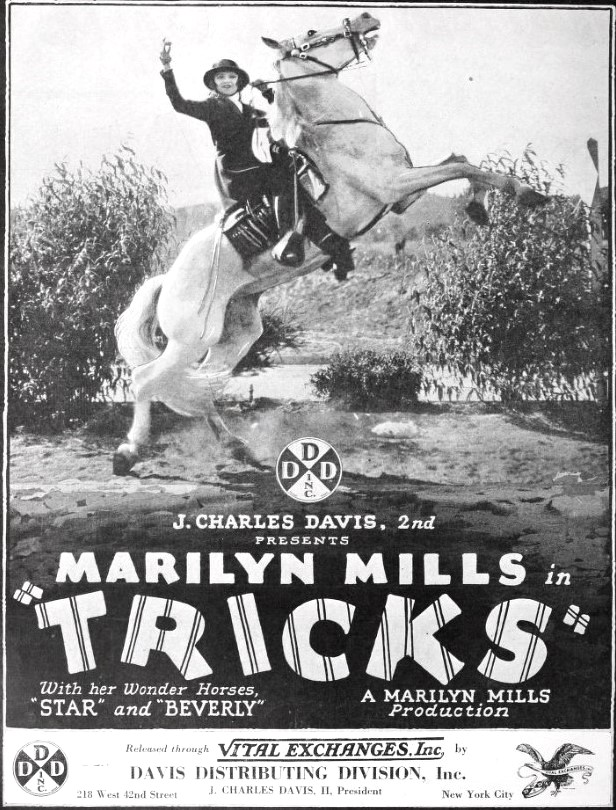
- Advertisement for the film Tricks (1925)
- Born: 1 November 1903; Enschede, Overijssel, Netherlands
- Died: 27 February 1956 (aged 52); Los Angeles, California, United States
- Occupation: Actress
- Years active: 1922–1927 (film)
- Spouse: J. Charles Davis

Marilyn Mills (1903–1956) was a Dutch-born American film actress of the silent era, described on theater marquees as "The Beautiful Marilyn Mills". She also produced two of her films.

Mills' father managed a large bakery in Los Angeles.

Before she became a film star, Mills worked as a stunt double, including riding for Mary Pickford in the film Dorothy Vernon of Haddon Hall. She also performed with her horses in the Al G. Barnes Circus.

Mills was married to J. Charles Davis, who worked in advertising and had his own film production company.

== Selected filmography ==
- A Western Demon (1922)
- Riders of the Plains (1924)
- Come on Cowboys! (1924)
- Two Fisted Justice (1924)
- Tricks (1925)
- Where Romance Rides (1925)
- The Cactus Cure (1925)
- Three Pals (1926)

== Bibliography ==
- Buck Rainey. Sweethearts of the sage: biographies and filmographies of 258 actresses appearing in western movies. McFarland & Company, 1992.
