= Where Romance Rides =

1925 film

- Directed by: Ward Hayes
- Produced by: Ben F. Wilson
- Starring: Dick Hatton; Marilyn Mills; Roy Laidlaw
- Production company: Ben Wilson Productions
- Distributed by: Arrow Film Corporation
- Release date: April 28, 1925
- Running time: 50 minutes
- Country: United States
- Languages: Silent; English intertitles

Where Romance Rides is a 1925 American silent Western film directed by Ward Hayes and starring Dick Hatton, Marilyn Mills and Roy Laidlaw.

== Synopsis ==
A wealthy New York banker and his daughter take a vacation in the West. While there she is rescued by a local ranch hand acting as a guide.

== Cast ==
- Dick Hatton as Dick Manners
- Marilyn Mills as Muriel Thompson
- Roy Laidlaw as Andrew J. Thompson
- Jack Richardson as Dave Colton
- Garry O'Dell as Thomas Lapsley
- Arthur Johnson as Walrus McNutt
- Archie Ricks as 'Dunk' Gresham
- Clara Morris as Imogene Harris

== Bibliography ==
- Connelly, Robert B. The Silents: Silent Feature Films, 1910-36, Volume 40, Issue 2. December Press, 1998.
- Langman, Larry. A Guide to Silent Westerns. Greenwood Publishing Group, 1992.
- Munden, Kenneth White. The American Film Institute Catalog of Motion Pictures Produced in the United States, Part 1. University of California Press, 1997.
