= Frank Baker (actor) =

Australian film actor (1892–1980)

- Born: 11 October 1892
- Died: 30 December 1980 (aged 88)
- Occupations: Actor, stuntman
- Years active: 1912–1974

Frank Baker (11 October 1892 – 30 December 1980) was an Australian-American actor and stuntman most noted for his appearances in A Chump at Oxford, The New Adventures of Tarzan, and Mary of Scotland.

He was a member of the informal John Ford Stock Company, appearing in 17 of Ford's films.

He also performed on television, in an uncredited role as a Townsman on Gene Barry's television Western series Bat Masterson in the 1960 episode "Six Feet of Gold".

== Partial filmography ==
- Cameo Kirby (1923)
- The Diamond Bandit (1924)
- The Fighting Heart (1925)
- Red Blood and Blue (1925)
- Scar Hanan (1925)
- Tentacles of the North (1926)
- The Gallant Fool (1926)
- The Bushranger (1928)
- A Million for Love (1928)
- The New Adventures of Tarzan (1935)
- Mary of Scotland (1936)
- Tundra (1936)
- London by Night (1937)
- Escape to Glory (1940)
- A Chump at Oxford (1940)
- The Blonde from Singapore (1941)
- Donovan's Reef (1963)
- Bedknobs and Broomsticks (1971)
