= Ruth Royce =

American actress

- Born: February 6, 1893; Versailles, Missouri, U.S.
- Died: May 7, 1971 (aged 78); Los Angeles, California, U.S.
- Occupation: Actor
- Years active: 1919 - 1927

Ruth Royce (February 6, 1893 – May 7, 1971) was an American vaudeville performer and silent film actress from Versailles, Missouri.

== Career ==
Royce appeared in the serial, The Vanishing Dagger (1920), which starred Eddie Polo and C. Norman Hammond. In 1923, Royce, along with other Hollywood actors, participated in a vaudeville show at Universal City. Royce assisted Joe Bonomo with a Strong Man act.

She performed in a number of western movies over the years like California in '49 (1924), Warrior Gap (1925), Fort Frayne (1926), The Oregon Trail (1923), In the Days of Buffalo Bill (1922), Perils of the Yukon (1922), Rawhide (1926), Wolves of the Desert (1926), and Code of the Cow Country (1927). The latter was Royce's final film.

Ruth Royce died in Los Angeles, California on May 7, 1971.

== Selected filmography ==
- The Girl in Number 29 (1920)
- The Vanishing Dagger (1920)
- Blue Streak McCoy (1920)
- 'If Only' Jim (1920)
- The Man Trackers (1921)
- All Dolled Up (1921)
- Perils of the Yukon (1922)
- In the Days of Buffalo Bill (1922)
- Caught Bluffing (1922)
- The Oregon Trail (1923)
- In the Days of Daniel Boone (1923)
- Beasts of Paradise (1923)
- Riders of the Plains (1924)
- The Empty Saddle (1925)
- Tonio, Son of the Sierras (1925)
- Officer 444 (1926)
- Rawhide (1926)
- Wolves of the Desert (1926)
- Fort Frayne (1926)
- The Gallant Fool (1926)
- Thunderbolt's Tracks (1927)
