= Two Fisted Justice (1924 film) =

1924 film

- Directed by: Dick Hatton
- Written by: Bennett Cohen
- Produced by: Ben F. Wilson
- Starring: Dick Hatton; Marilyn Mills; J. Morris Foster
- Production company: Ben Wilson Productions
- Distributed by: Arrow Film Corporation
- Release date: August 30, 1924
- Running time: 50 minutes
- Country: United States
- Languages: Silent; English intertitles

Two Fisted Justice is a 1924 American silent Western film directed by Dick Hatton and starring Hatton, Marilyn Mills and J. Morris Foster.

== Cast ==
- Dick Hatton as Sheriff Rance Raine
- Marilyn Mills as Mort Landeau's Wife
- J. Morris Foster as Mort Landeau
- Arthur Morrison as Gang leader

== Bibliography ==
- Pitts, Michael R. Western Movies: A Guide to 5,105 Feature Films. McFarland, 2012.
