= Western Courage (1927 film) =

1927 film

- Directed by: Ben Wilson
- Written by: Leslie Curtis
- Produced by: Ben Wilson
- Starring: Dick Hatton; Elsa Benham; Robert Walker
- Cinematography: Eddie Linden
- Production company: Ben Wilson Productions
- Distributed by: Rayart Pictures
- Release date: April 1927 (US)
- Running time: 5 reels
- Country: United States
- Languages: Silent; English intertitles

Western Courage is a 1927 American silent Western film directed by Ben Wilson, starring Dick Hatton, Elsa Benham, and Robert Walker.

== Cast ==
- Dick Hatton
- Elsa Benham
- Robert Walker
- Art Mix
- Ed La Niece
- Al Ferguson
