= The Gallant Fool (1926 film) =

1926 film

- Directed by: Duke Worne
- Written by: George W. Pyper
- Produced by: W. Ray Johnston
- Starring: Billy Sullivan; Hazel Deane; Ruth Royce
- Production company: Duke Worne Productions
- Distributed by: Rayart Pictures
- Release date: December 1926
- Running time: 5 reels
- Country: United States
- Languages: Silent; English intertitles

The Gallant Fool is a 1926 American silent romantic drama film directed by Duke Worne and starring Billy Sullivan, Hazel Deane and Ruth Royce. The film is set in a Ruritanian Kingdom named Valdonia, where a young American arrives to collect a debt towards his millionaire father but ends up impersonating a prince.

== Cast ==
- Billy Sullivan as Billy Banner
- Hazel Deane as Princess Iris
- Ruth Royce as Cynthia
- Frank Baker as Count Danvo
- Jimmy Aubrey as Beaney Mulligan
- Ferdinand Schumann-Heink as Crown Prince Boris
- Robert Walker as Captain Turgemore

== Bibliography ==
- Munden, Kenneth White. The American Film Institute Catalog of Motion Pictures Produced in the United States, Part 1. University of California Press, 1997.
