= Edward Linden =

American cinematographer

- Born: Edwin Gilbert Linden; 26 August 1891; Lake Geneva, Wisconsin, US
- Died: 15 November 1956 (age 68); Los Angeles, California, US
- Other names: Edwin Gilbert Linden (Birth Name), Edwin G. Linden, Eddie Linden, Edward Linden, Eddie Linder.
- Occupations: Cinematographer, Director of Photography, Director, Camera and Electrical Department, Special Effects, Visual Effects
- Known for: Work on King Kong and Son of Kong with Frank Buck and Special/Visual Effects on The Adventures of Mark Twain.
- Spouse: Georgia Hazel Linden

Edward Linden (born Edwin Gilbert Linden, August 26, 1891, in Lake Geneva, Wisconsin, USA; died November 15, 1956 (age 68) in Los Angeles, California, USA) was an American cinematographer. He served as cinematographer for King Kong, Son of Kong, and the Frank Buck serial Jungle Menace, as well directing Scar Hanan.

== Career ==
During World War I, Linden worked in Chicago for the Selig Polyscope Company as a motion picture photographer, according to his World War I draft registration card. His career started in the silent film era with A Modern Day Mother Goose and The Mask. Linden was most notably associated with his cinematography/photography work on King Kong. Following his work on Son of Kong, Linden photographed a string of B pictures and westerns, including Slaves in Bondage, Isle of Destiny, The Lost City, Today I Hang, The Dawn Express, Rough Riding Ranger, The Secret of Treasure Island, The Man in the Saddle, City of Missing Girls, Hard Guy, The Werewolf, A Yank in Libya, and The Mysterious Pilot. Linden moved into television in the 1950s. He was noted for his choice of camera, the Mitchell no. 66, which he used during the filming of King Kong, and for his visual/special effects work in The Adventures of Mark Twain.

== Work with Frank Buck ==
In 1937, Linden was a cinematographer for the Frank Buck serial Jungle Menace.

== Selected filmography ==
- Mine to Keep (1923)
- Other Men's Daughters (1923)
- The Love Trap (1923)
- The Riding Comet (1925)
- Scar Hanan (1925)
- Speeding Hoofs (1927)
- The Range Riders (1927)
- Hard Fists (1927)
- Set Free (1927)
- Paroled from the Big House (1938)
- Crashing Thru (1939)
- I'll Sell My Life (1941)
