= Fred Humes =

American actor

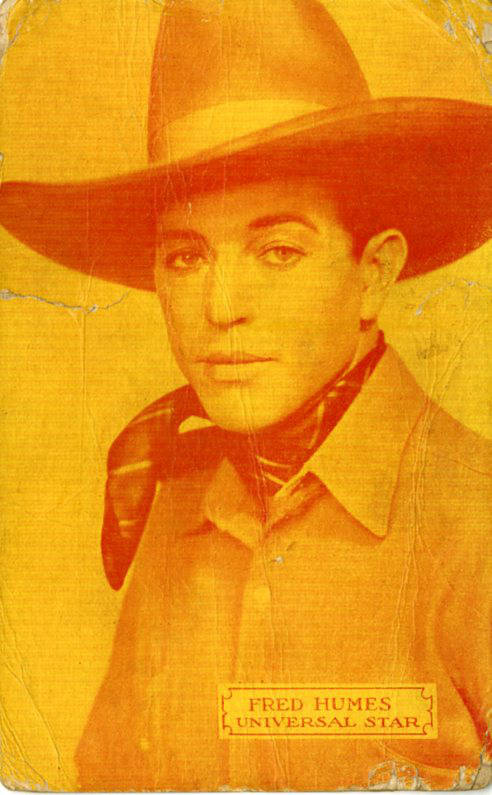
- Fred Humes
- Born: June 15, 1896; Dents Run, Pennsylvania, U.S.
- Died: January 3, 1971 (aged 74); Pueblo, Colorado, U.S.
- Occupation: Actor

Fred Humes (June 15, 1896 – January 3, 1971) was an American actor best known for his work in Western films.

Humes was born and educated in Pittsburgh.

He appeared in the films Ride for Your Life, The Ridin' Kid from Powder River, The Hurricane Kid, The Saddle Hawk, Let 'er Buck, The Yellow Back, Prowlers of the Night, The Stolen Ranch, Blazing Days, One Glorious Scrap, Put 'Em Up, Circus Rookies, Battling with Buffalo Bill, Law and Order, Clancy of the Mounted, The Cactus Kid, Sunset Range, The Roaring West and The Day the Bookies Wept, among others.
