= Plain clothes =

Plain clothes or Plainclothes may refer to:

- Plainclothes law enforcement
- Plain Clothes (1925 film), a silent black and white short American film
- Plain Clothes (1988 film), an American comedy film
- Plainclothes (film), 2025 American film
- Plain Clothes Theatre Productions, a theatre company based in Bristol, England
- Plainclothes (TV series), a 1990s New Zealand crime drama series
- Plain dress, a religious practice of wearing clothes of traditional, modest design
