= Come Through =

Come Through may refer to:

- Come Through (film), a 1917 American silent film
- "Come Through" (H.E.R. song), a 2021 song by H.E.R.
- "Come Through", a song by Jonas Blue from the album Blue
- "Come Thru", 2020 song by Summer Walker and Usher
