= The Bowery Bishop =

1924 film by Colin Campbell

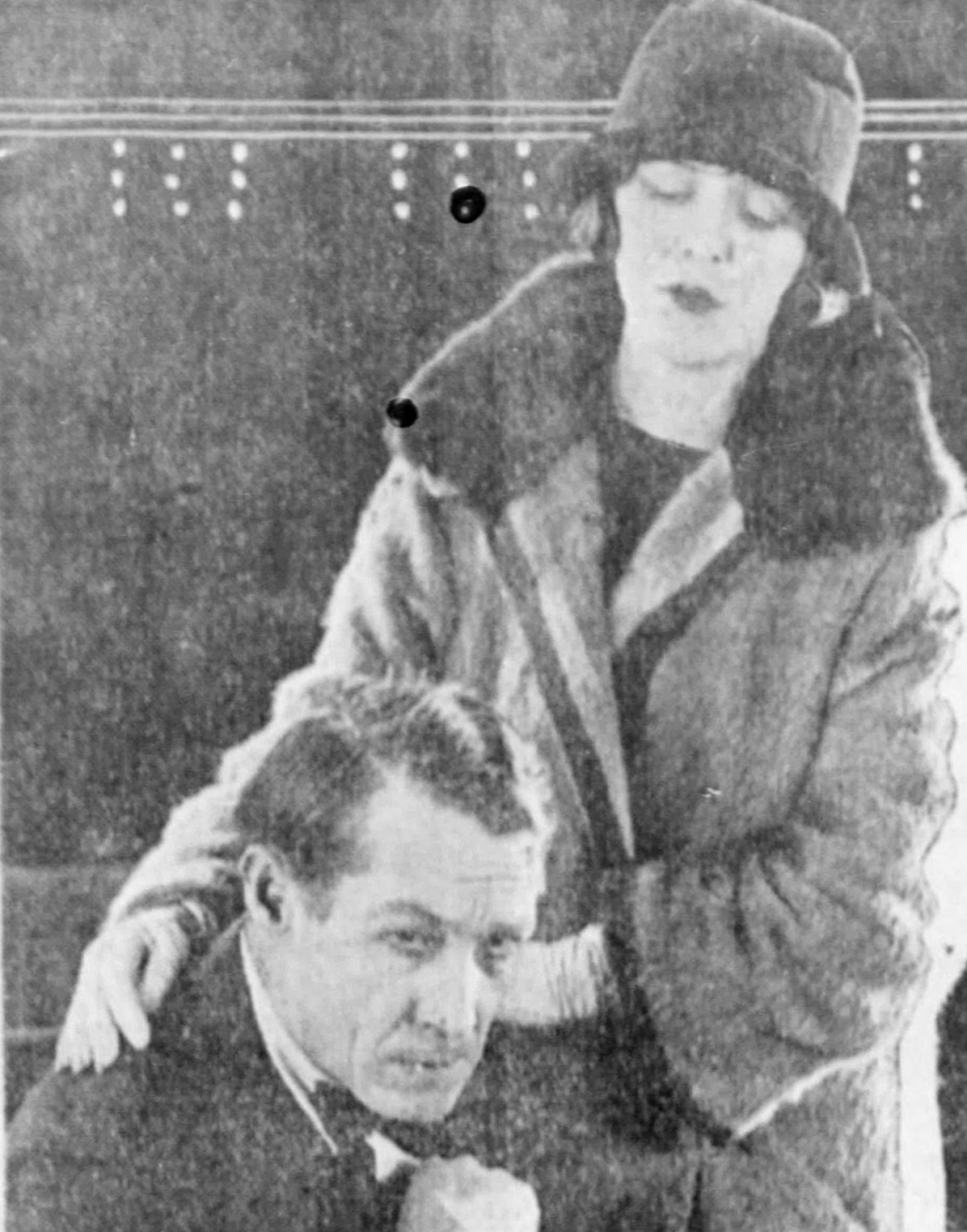
- Publicity photo
- Directed by: Colin Campbell
- Written by: Alexander Irvine
- Produced by: Grace Sanderson Michie; Orlando Edgar Miller
- Starring: Henry B. Walthall; Leota Lorraine; Edith Roberts
- Cinematography: A.G. Heimerl
- Production company: Rellimeo Film Syndicate
- Distributed by: Selznick Pictures
- Release date: August 30, 1924
- Running time: 6 reels
- Country: United States
- Languages: Silent; English intertitles

The Bowery Bishop is a 1924 American silent drama film directed by Colin Campbell and starring Henry B. Walthall, Leota Lorraine, and Edith Roberts.

== Plot ==
Tim Brady accuses Norman Strong, of seducing Venitia Rigola, the girl he loves.

== Cast ==
- Henry B. Walthall as Norman Strong
- Leota Lorraine as Sybil Stuyvesant
- George Fisher as Philip Foster
- Lee Shumway as Tim Brady
- Edith Roberts as Venitia Rigola
- William Ryno as Tony Rigola
- Norval MacGregor as Mr. Kindly

== Bibliography ==
- Donald W. McCaffrey & Christopher P. Jacobs. Guide to the Silent Years of American Cinema. Greenwood Publishing, 1999. ISBN 0-313-30345-2
