= Jean Hathaway =

Hungarian-born American actress (1876–1938)

- Born: Lillie Bishop; June 15, 1876; Budapest, Austro-Hungarian Empire (now Hungary)
- Died: August 23, 1938 (aged 62); Los Angeles, California, United States
- Burial place: Forest Lawn Memorial Park
- Other names: Marquise Lillie de Fiennes, Jane Hathaway
- Occupations: Belgian marquess; singer; actress; screenplay writer
- Years active: 1902–1925
- Spouse: Rhody Hathaway (m. 1894–1938; death)
- Children: 4, including Henry Hathaway

Jean Hathaway (née Lillie Bishop; 1876–1938) was a Hungarian-born Belgian and American stage and silent film actress, singer, and claimed to be a Belgian Marquise through marriage. Her career began on the vaudeville circuit; and by 1908 she was an early star of Allan Dwan's American Film Manufacturing Company. After her marriage in 1894, she also went by the names Marquise Lillie de Fiennes and Jane Hathaway.

== Early life and family ==
She was born as Lillie Bishop on June 15, 1876, in Budapest during the Austro-Hungarian Empire (now Hungary). She immigrated to the United States around 1882.

She was married to San Francisco actor Rhody Hathaway (1868–1944; né Rudolph Henry de Fiennes) in 1894 and they had four children, including film director Henry Hathaway.

== Career ==
Hathaway's career began on the vaudeville circuit and in theaters in Sacramento, California and in the San Francisco Bay Area. She was known for his contralto singing.

By 1909 she was an early star of Allan Dwan's American Film Manufacturing Company, starring as a heroine in films often alongside her husband Rhody and sometimes with their young son Henry Hathaway. From 1911 until 1914, the Hathaway family worked for Thomas Ince's Inceville Studios. At the age of 35 in 1911, she appeared in the short comedy film, The Eastern Cowboy, produced by the American Film Manufacturing Company, directed by Alan Dwan, and starring J. Warren Kerrigan.

She wrote the screenplay for the short film Following Father's Footsteps (1915), directed by Alfred Ernest Christie (of the Christie brothers). In the 1920s, Rhody abandoned his family, leaving Jean as a single parent.

== Death ==
Hathaway died on August 23, 1938 in the Queen of Angels Hospital in Los Angeles, at the age of 62 after experiencing a brain hemorrhage. She is buried in Forest Lawn Memorial Park in Glendale, California.

== Filmography ==
- The Eastern Cowboy (1911), short film directed by Allan Dwan
- The Bugle Call (1912), short film directed by Thomas H. Ince
- For the Cause (1912), short film directed by Thomas H. Ince and Francis Ford
- Lucille Love, Girl of Mystery (1914), directed by Francis Ford
- The Master Key (1914 serial), directed by Robert Z. Leonard; as Jean Darnell
- The Jackals of a Great City (1916), directed by Edward LeSaint
- Bobbie of the Ballet (1916), directed by Joe De Grasse; as Mrs. Stimson
- The Adventures of Peg o' the Ring (1916), by Francis Ford and Jacques Jaccard; as Mrs. Lund
- The Scrapper (1917), directed by John Ford
- The Tornado (1917), directed by John Ford; as Jack's mother
- Come Through (1917), directed by Jack Conway; as Mrs. Sylvester Van Deek
- The Divorcee (1917), directed by William Wolbert; as Mrs. Pelham-Wilson
- The Craving (1918), directed by Francis Ford and John Ford
- The Finger of Justice (1918), directed by Louis Chaudet
- The Wishing Ring Man (1919), directed by David Smith; as Mrs. Hewitt
- Short Skirts (1921), directed by Harry B. Harris; as Mrs. Shirley Smith
- Boy Crazy (1922), directed by William A. Seiter; as Mrs. Cameron
- Plain Clothes (1925), directed by Harry Edwards; Mrs O'Grady
