= Defying Destiny =

1923 American silent drama film by Louis Chaudet

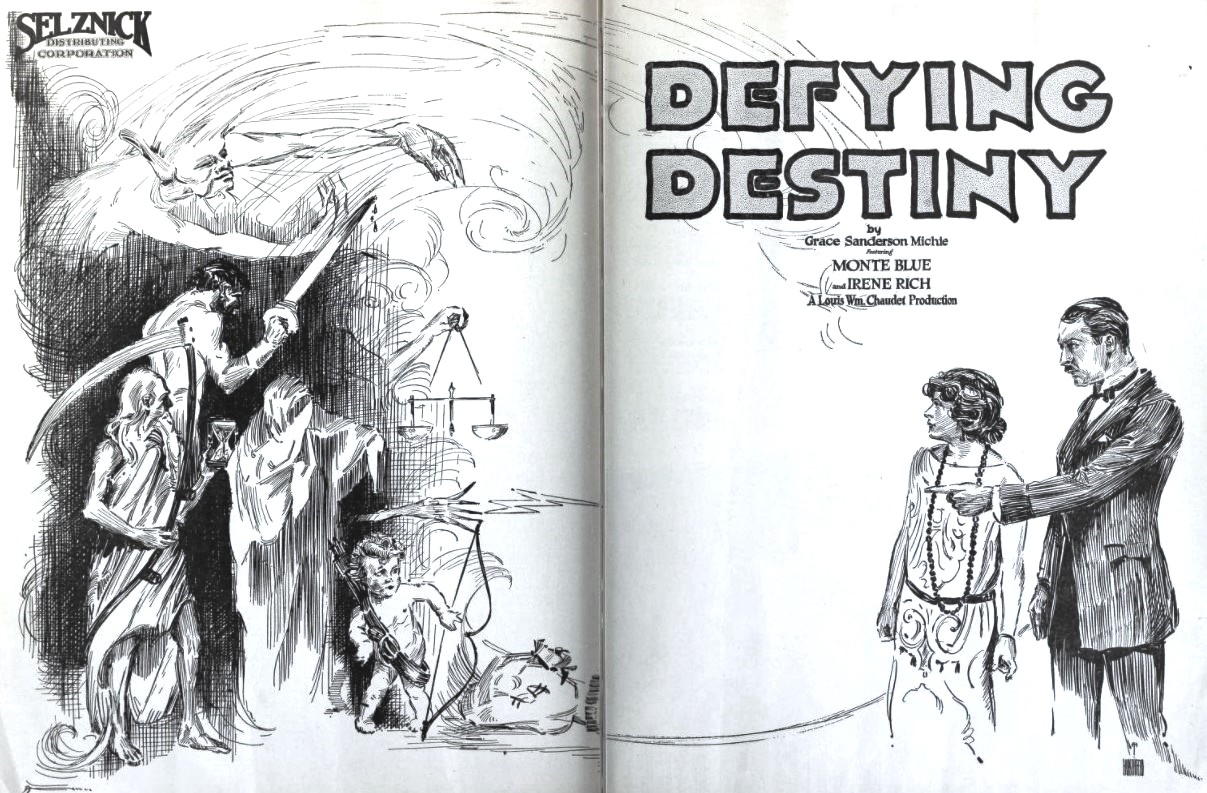
- Irene Rich and Monte Blue
- Directed by: Louis Chaudet
- Written by: Grace Sanderson Michie
- Produced by: Rellimeo Film Syndicate
- Starring: Monte Blue; Irene Rich
- Cinematography: Lenwood Abbott
- Distributed by: Selznick Distributing Corporation
- Release date: October 29, 1923
- Running time: 6 reels
- Country: United States
- Language: Silent (English intertitles)

Defying Destiny is a 1923 American silent drama film directed by Louis Chaudet and starring Monte Blue and Irene Rich.

== Cast ==
- Monte Blue as Jack Fenton
- Irene Rich as Beth Alden
- Tully Marshall as Dr. Gregory
- Jackie Saunders as Mrs. Harris
- Z. Wall Covington as Sam Harris
- Russell Simpson as Mr. Wilkens
- James Gordon as Mr. Alden
- Frona Hale as Mrs. Alden
- Laura Ames as Jack Fenton's Aunt
- George Reehm as The Promoter

== Preservation ==
The film Defying Destiny

Defying Destiny was thought to be a lost film until a print was found and repatriated to the George Eastman Museum from New Zealand in 2010 with several other American films.
