= The Parisian Tigress =

1919 silent film directed by Frank R. Strayer

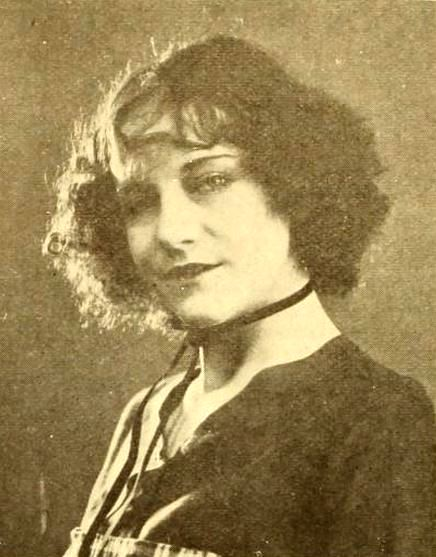
- Still with Viola Dana
- Directed by: Herbert Blaché
- Screenplay by: Finis Fox
- Story by: June Mathis; Albert Capellani
- Produced by: Maxwell Karger
- Starring: Viola Dana; Darrell Foss; Henry Kolker
- Cinematography: John Arnold
- Production company: Metro Pictures
- Release date: March 31, 1919 (US)
- Running time: 5 reels
- Country: United States
- Language: Silent (English intertitles)

The Parisian Tigress, also known by its working title Jeanne of the Gutter, is a 1919 American silent drama film, directed by Herbert Blaché. It stars Viola Dana, Darrell Foss, and Henry Kolker, and was released on March 31, 1919.

== Cast list ==
- Viola Dana as Jeanne
- Darrell Foss as Albert Chauroy
- Henry Kolker as Henri Dutray
- Edward J. Connelly as Count de Suchet
- Clarissa Selwynne as Mlle. de Suchet
- Louis Darclay as Jacques, an Apache
- Paul Weigel as The elder Count de Suchet
- Mitzi Goodstadt as Mimi
- Maree Beaudet as Cisette
