= Held In Trust =

1920 film

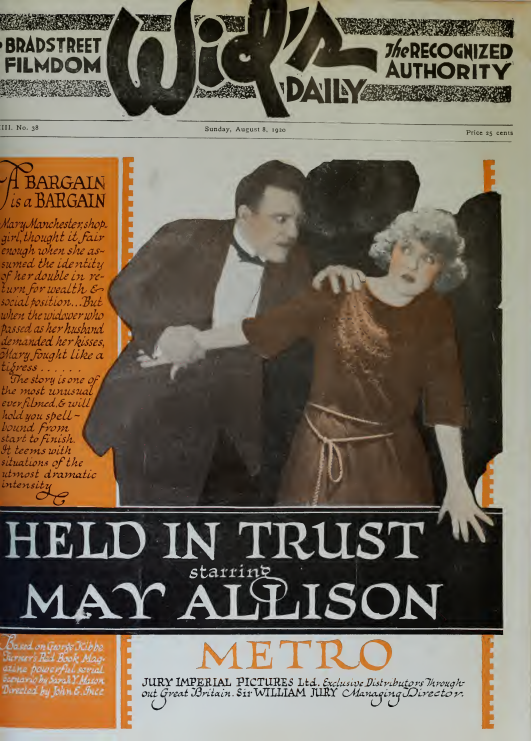
- Advertisement
- Directed by: John Ince
- Written by: Sarah Y. Mason; Bayard Veiller (intertitles)
- Based on: Held In Trust by George Kibbe Turner
- Starring: May Allison
- Cinematography: William Edmond
- Edited by: Robert De Lacey
- Production company: Metro Pictures
- Distributed by: Metro Pictures
- Release date: August 2, 1920
- Running time: 60 minutes
- Country: United States
- Language: Silent (English intertitles)

Held In Trust is a lost 1920 American silent romance film directed by John Ince and produced and distributed by Metro Pictures. The film stars May Allison.

== Plot ==
As described in a film magazine, struck by her resemblance to Adelaide Rutherford, dissolute husband Hasbrouck Rutherford (Long) and attorney Jasper Haig (Elliott) inveigle shop girl Mary Manchester (Allison) into impersonating the wealthy woman. Hasbrouck and Jasper have been misusing the funds of the wife and her pending death threatens their exposure. Because Adelaide's husband's evil dissipations have driven her insane and separated them, the conspirators believe the duplicity can be easily effected and the funds and knowledge of her death kept from her heir, her nephew Stanford Gorgas (Foss). An associate of Stanford convinces him that there is something mysterious about the situation, and he proceeds to investigate. He visits Mary in the Rutherford home, and she learns that he is the heir. Appealing to him, he rescues her from the hands of the plotters, only to have the conspirators' carefully laid scheme bring Mary back into their hands. An attempt by Hasbrouck to force his attentions on Mary results in the death of attorney Jasper and his own insanity, leaving the funds to the lovers and allowing them to live in peace.

== Cast ==
- May Allison as Mary Manchester
- Darrell Foss as Stanford Gorgas
- Walter Long as Hasbrouck Rutherford
- John Elliott as Jasper Haig (credited as John H. Elliott)
- Lawrence Grant as Dr. Babcock
- G. Burnell Manly as Dr. David Kirkland
- Teddy Whack as Dog
