= The Woman I Love (1929 film) =

1929 film

- Directed by: George Melford
- Written by: Randolph Bartlett; Gordon Rigby; Irma Stormquist
- Starring: Margaret Morris; Robert Frazer; Leota Lorraine
- Cinematography: Virgil Miller
- Edited by: Jack Kitchin
- Production company: Film Booking Offices of America
- Distributed by: Film Booking Offices of America
- Release date: May 1, 1929
- Running time: 70 minutes
- Country: United States
- Language: Silent (English intertitles)

The Woman I Love is a 1929 American silent drama film directed by George Melford and starring Margaret Morris, Robert Frazer and Leota Lorraine.

== Cast ==
- Margaret Morris as Edna Reed
- Robert Frazer as John Reed
- Leota Lorraine as Lois Parker
- Norman Kerry as Kenneth Hamilton
- Bert Moorhouse as Lois' Boyfriend

== Bibliography ==
- George A. Katchmer. Eighty Silent Film Stars: Biographies and Filmographies of the Obscure to the Well Known. McFarland, 1991.
