= Her American Husband =

1918 American silent film

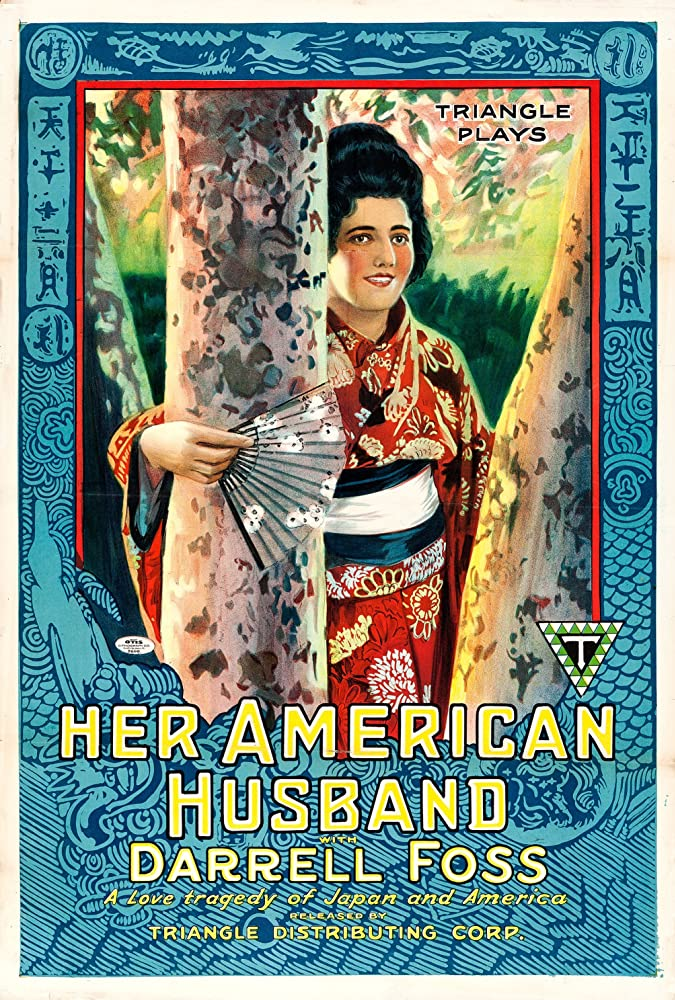
- Directed by: E. Mason Hopper
- Written by: E. Magnus Middleton
- Starring: Teddy Sampson; Darrell Foss; Leota Lorraine
- Cinematography: Friend Baker
- Production company: Triangle Film Corporation
- Distributed by: Triangle Distributing
- Release date: January 27, 1918
- Running time: 50 minutes
- Country: United States
- Languages: Silent; English intertitles

Her American Husband is a 1918 American silent drama film directed by E. Mason Hopper and starring Teddy Sampson, Darrell Foss and Leota Lorraine.

== Cast ==
- Teddy Sampson as Cherry Blossom
- Darrell Foss as Herbert Franklyn
- Leota Lorraine as Miriam Faversham
- Kisaburô Kurihara as Tokimasa
- Misao Seki as Yoshisada
- Yutaka Abe as Kato Nakamura
- Will Jeffries as Mason
- Arthur Millett as Abott
- Ludwig Lowry as Jessop
- Kathleen Emerson as Dolly Varden

== Bibliography ==
- Robert B. Connelly. The Silents: Silent Feature Films, 1910-36. December Press, 1998.
