= The Edge of the Law =

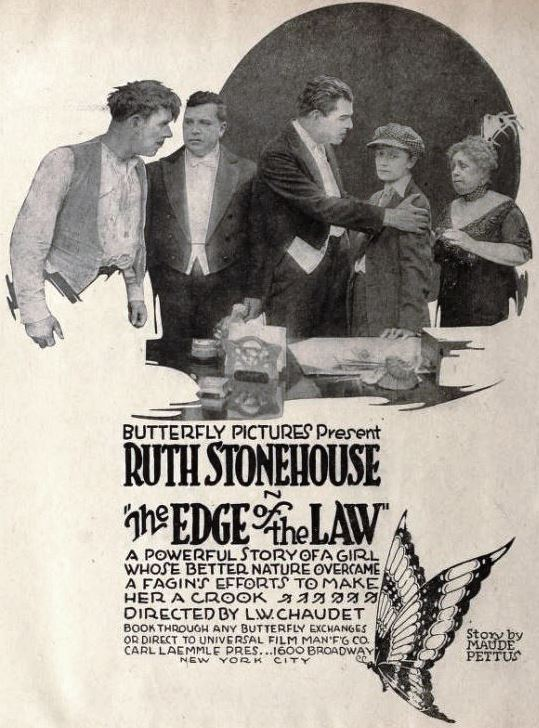
- Directed by: Louis Chaudet
- Written by: Harvey Gates; Maude Pettus
- Starring: Ruth Stonehouse; Lloyd Whitlock; Lydia Yeamans Titus
- Production company: Universal Pictures
- Distributed by: Universal Pictures
- Release date: September 24, 1917
- Running time: 50 minutes
- Country: United States
- Languages: Silent; English intertitles

The Edge of the Law is a 1917 American silent crime drama film directed by Louis Chaudet and starring Ruth Stonehouse, Lloyd Whitlock and Lydia Yeamans Titus.

== Cast ==
- Ruth Stonehouse as Nancy Glenn
- Lloyd Whitlock as Ralph Harding
- Lydia Yeamans Titus as Mrs. Harding
- Harry Dunkinson as Spike
- M.W. Testa as Pop Hogland
- Jack Dill as Pliny Drew
- Betty Schade as Stella Farnsworth

== Bibliography ==
- Robert B. Connelly. The Silents: Silent Feature Films, 1910-36, Volume 40, Issue 2. December Press, 1998.
