= Follow the Girl =

1917 film

- Directed by: Louis Chaudet
- Written by: Fred Myton
- Starring: Ruth Stonehouse; Jack Dill; Roy Stewart
- Production company: Universal Pictures
- Distributed by: Universal Pictures
- Release date: July 26, 1917
- Running time: 50 minutes
- Country: United States
- Languages: Silent; English intertitles

Follow the Girl is a lost 1917 American silent Western film directed by Louis Chaudet and starring Ruth Stonehouse, Jack Dill and Roy Stewart.

== Cast ==
- Ruth Stonehouse as Hilda Swanson
- Jack Dill as Olaf
- Roy Stewart as Larry O'Keefe
- Mattie Witting as Mrs. O'Keefe
- Claire Du Brey as Donna
- Alfred Allen as Martinez
- Harry Dunkinson as Hong Foo

== Preservation ==
With no holdings located in archives, Follow the Girl is considered a lost film.
