= Darrell Foss =

American actor

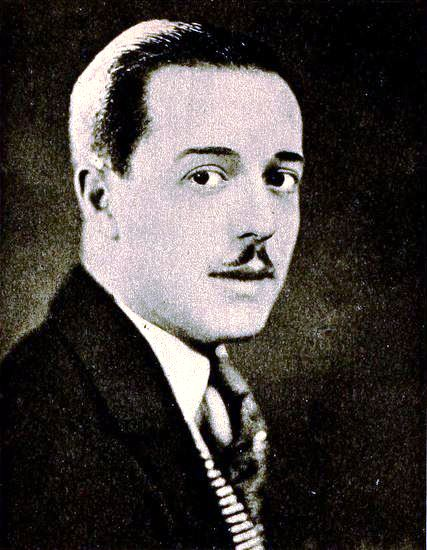
- 1920 photo by Nelson Evans
- Born: Darrell Burton Foss; March 28, 1892; Oconomowoc, Wisconsin, U.S.
- Died: September 15, 1962 (aged 70); Los Angeles, California, U.S.
- Occupation: Actor
- Years active: 1917–1922

Darrell Foss (born Darrell Burton Foss; March 24, 1892 – September 15, 1962) was a film actor. He had a leading role in films including in The Loyalty of Taro San, a Triangle Film Corporation production, and opposite May Allison in at least two films, The Walk-Offs and Held in Trust. He taught a character played by Gloria Swanson to play the banjo in one film.

== Biography ==
Darrell Foss was born 28 March 1892 in Oconomowoc, Wisconsin, USA as Darrell Burton Foss. He died 15 September 1962 in Los Angeles, California at the age of 70.

== Filmography ==
- An Even Break (1917)
- Polly Ann (1917)
- The Firefly of Tough Luck (1917)
- The Regenerates (197)
- The Testing of Mildred Vane (1918)
- You Can't Believe Everything (1918)
- The Return of Mary (1918)
- Her Decision (1918)
- Her American Husband (1918)
- The Loyalty of Taro San (1918)
- The Man Who Woke Up (1918)
- A Soul Trust (1918)
- The Red Lantern (1919)
- The Parisian Tigress (1919)
- Loot (1919)
- The Brat (1919)
- The Walk-Offs (1920)
- Held In Trust (1920)
- From the Ground Up (film) (1921)
- An Unwilling Hero (1921)
- Don't Neglect Your Wife (1921)
- Luring Lips (1921), Foss played opposite Edith Roberts as a married couple
- The Woman He Married (1922)
- A Homespun Vamp (1922)
