= Fools of Fortune (1922 film) =

1922 film

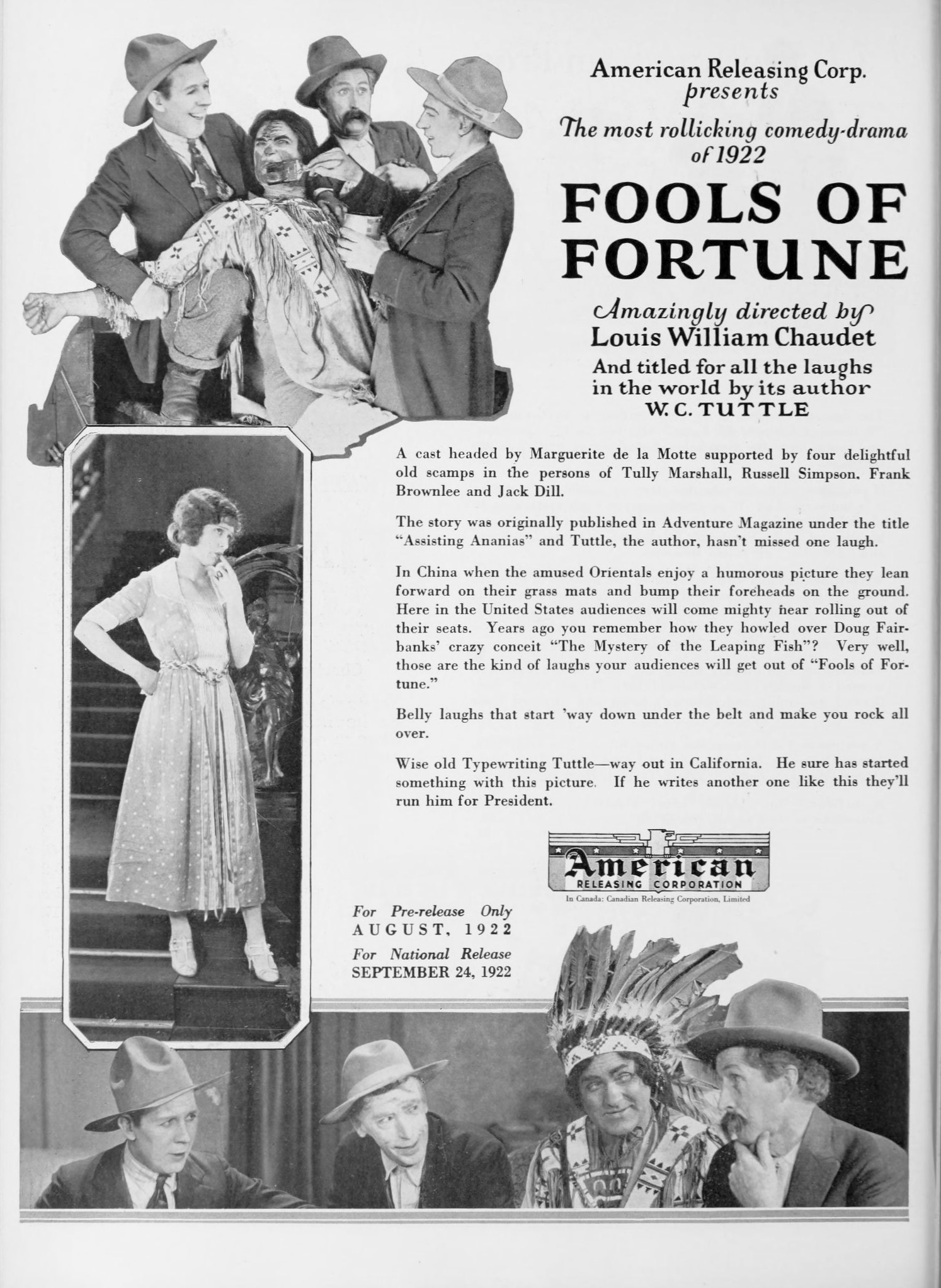
- Directed by: Louis Chaudet
- Written by: W. C. Tuttle
- Produced by: A. Byron Davis
- Starring: Frank Dill; Russell Simpson; Marguerite De La Motte; Tully Marshall
- Cinematography: King D. Gray
- Production company: Golden State Films
- Distributed by: American Releasing Corporation
- Release date: September 24, 1922
- Running time: 60 minutes
- Country: United States
- Languages: Silent; English intertitles

Fools of Fortune is a 1922 American silent comedy Western film directed by Louis Chaudet and starring Russell Simpson, Marguerite De La Motte and Tully Marshall. A copy is reportedly held at the George Eastman Museum.

== Cast ==
- Frank Dill as Chuck Warner
- Russell Simpson as Magpie Simpkins
- Tully Marshall as Scenery Sims
- Frank Brownlee as Ike Harper
- Tom Ricketts as Milton DePuyster
- Lillian Langdon as Mrs DePuyster
- Marguerite De La Motte as Marion DePuyster

== Bibliography ==
- Connelly, Robert B. The Silents: Silent Feature Films, 1910-36, Volume 40, Issue 2. December Press, 1998.
- Munden, Kenneth White. The American Film Institute Catalog of Motion Pictures Produced in the United States, Part 1. University of California Press, 1997.
