= Leota Lorraine =

American film actor (1899–1974)

- Born: March 14, 1899; Kansas City, Missouri, United States
- Died: July 9, 1974 (aged 75); Los Angeles, California, United States
- Occupation: Actress
- Years active: 1915-1959 (film)

Leota Lorraine (1899–1974) was an American film actress. A leading lady and supporting player of the silent era.

After the introduction of sound she generally played minor, often uncredited, parts. A stint as Mary Boland's stand-in led to her being cast as Boland's sister in Ruggles of Red Gap (1935).

== Selected filmography ==
- The Promise (1917)
- Her American Husband (1918)
- The Kaiser's Shadow (1918)
- Playing the Game (1918)
- The Finger of Justice (1918)
- Desert Law (1918)
- Know Thy Wife (1918)
- The Girl Dodger (1919)
- The Pest (1919)
- Luck in Pawn (1919)
- The Loves of Letty (1919)
- Her Five-Foot Highness (1920)
- The Misfit Wife (1920)
- The Turning Point (1920)
- The Bowery Bishop (1924)
- Infatuation (1925)
- The Woman I Love (1929)
- Sprucin' Up (1935)
- Ruggles of Red Gap (1935)

== Bibliography ==
- Solomon, Aubrey. The Fox Film Corporation, 1915-1935: A History and Filmography. McFarland, 2011.
