= The Finger of Justice =

1918 film by Louis Chaudet

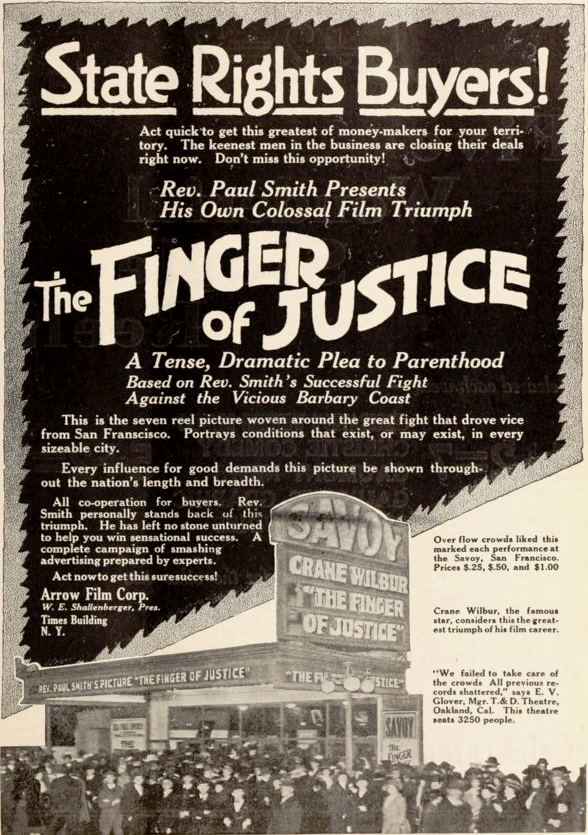
- Advertisement for film
- Directed by: Louis Chaudet
- Written by: Grace Sanderson Michie
- Produced by: Rev. Paul Smith
- Starring: Crane Wilbur; Henry A. Barrows; Jane O'Rourke
- Cinematography: Lenwood Abbott
- Production company: Paul Smith Pictures
- Distributed by: Arrow Film Corporation
- Release date: July 1918
- Running time: 7 reels
- Country: United States
- Language: Silent (English intertitles)

The Finger of Justice is a 1918 American silent drama film directed by Louis Chaudet. The film is based upon the campaign to close down the red-light district of the Barbary Coast of San Francisco.

== Plot ==
The Finger of Justice (1918)

As described in a film magazine, William Randall (Barrows), a political boss, allows evil to flourish in his city district while he enjoys great profits. The arrival of the Reverend Noel Delaney (Wilbur) and his fight against the underworld frightens the political leader. When he finds his daughter Betty (Booker) has been lured into one of the dives, he goes to her rescue and is killed. His death awakens the people and shortly Delaney's efforts are successful.

== Cast ==
- Crane Wilbur as Noel Delaney
- Henry A. Barrows as William Randall
- Jane O'Rourke as Yvonne
- Mae Gaston as Mary
- Leota Lorraine as Edith
- Beulah Booker as Betty Randall
- Velma Whitman as Louise Bradley
- Jean Hathaway as Mrs. Bradley
- John Oaker as Flip
- Jack Lott as Jack Randall

== Reception ==
Although the film was about an anti-vice campaign, the subject of prostitution created issues in showing the film. The film was scheduled to premiere on 29 June 1918 at the Lyric Theatre in New York City, but New York did not authorize showing the film. Although the film was endorsed by the Superintendent of Police in Washington, D.C., it was banned in Maryland, New York, and Chicago.

== Preservation ==
A copy of the film has been released on DVD.
