= Lightning Bill =

1926 film

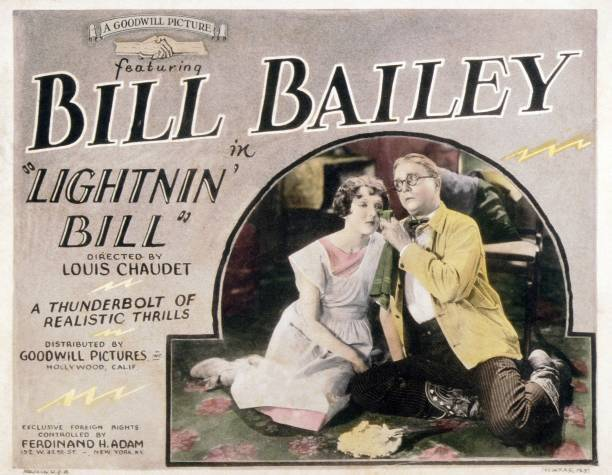
- Directed by: Louis Chaudet
- Starring: William Bailey; Jean Arthur; Jack Henderson
- Production company: Goodwill Productions
- Distributed by: Goodwill Productions
- Release date: May 29, 1926
- Running time: 50 minutes
- Country: United States
- Languages: Silent; English intertitles

Lightning Bill is a 1926 American silent Western film directed by Louis Chaudet and starring William Bailey, Jean Arthur and Jack Henderson. It was produced as a second feature by the independent Goodwill Productions.

== Cast ==
- William Bailey as William W. Williams
- Jean Arthur as Marie Denton
- Edward Heim as John R. Denton
- Jack Henderson as Edward G. Hookem
- Charles Meakin as Daniel Carson
- Tom Shirley as Lionel Jay Murphy

== Bibliography ==
- Connelly, Robert B. The Silents: Silent Feature Films, 1910-36, Volume 40, Issue 2. December Press, 1998.
- Munden, Kenneth White. The American Film Institute Catalog of Motion Pictures Produced in the United States, Part 1. University of California Press, 1997.
- Oller, John. Jean Arthur: The Actress Nobody Knew. Limelight Editions, 1999.
- Rainey, Buck. Sweethearts of the Sage: Biographies and Filmographies of 258 actresses appearing in Western movies. McFarland & Company, 1992.
