= The Craving (1918 film) =

1918 film

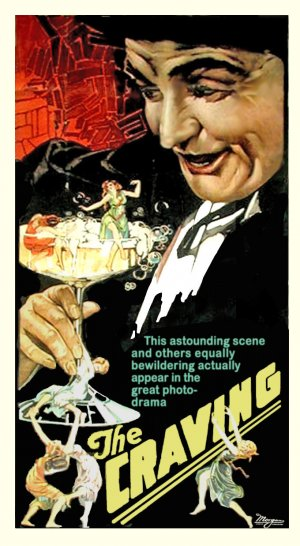
- Theatrical poster
- Directed by: Francis Ford; John Ford
- Written by: John Ford
- Screenplay by: Francis Ford
- Story by: Francis Ford
- Starring: Francis Ford; Mae Gaston
- Cinematography: Edward Gheller
- Production company: Bluebird Photoplays
- Distributed by: Universal Pictures
- Release date: September 22, 1918
- Running time: 50 minutes
- Country: United States
- Languages: Silent; English intertitles

The Craving is a 1918 American silent drama film written and directed by John and Francis Ford. A 35mm print of the film with Dutch intertitles survives in the EYE Film Instituut Nederland film archive.

== Plot ==
Carroll Wayles is a chemist who has discovered the formula for a high explosive. This is a secret All Kasarib wishes to learn.

He uses his ward, Beulah Grey, who is under his hypnotic power, to tempt Wayles with liquor, knowing that he has formerly been addicted to drink, but had overcome it. Wayles returns to his former mode of living. Kasarib gains the ascendency over him and learns the secret. Wayles’ spirit is taken on an imaginary trip over battlegrounds and through scenes of lust to show him the pitfalls that await slaves of the flesh.

Wayles awakens a changed man. He goes to the laboratory of Kasarib, where there is a struggle, during which an explosion kills Kasarib. Wayles and the ward are then free to marry each other.

== Cast ==
- Francis Ford as Carroll Wayles
- Mae Gaston as Beulah Grey
- Peter Gerald as Ala Kasarib
- Duke Worne as Dick Wayles
- Jean Hathaway as Mrs. Wayles

== Reception ==
Variety's review of The Craving was mixed, finding the story to be lacking and the cinematography "not particularly extraordinary."

Moving Picture World reviewer Margaret I. MacDonald also gave a mixed review, finding that effects were well made, but the story's message was not communicated clearly.

Wid's Daily gave a positive review, despite noting that the story was "incidental" to the film, existing as a structure to feature the trick effects.
