= Nelson Evans =

American photographer (1889–1922)

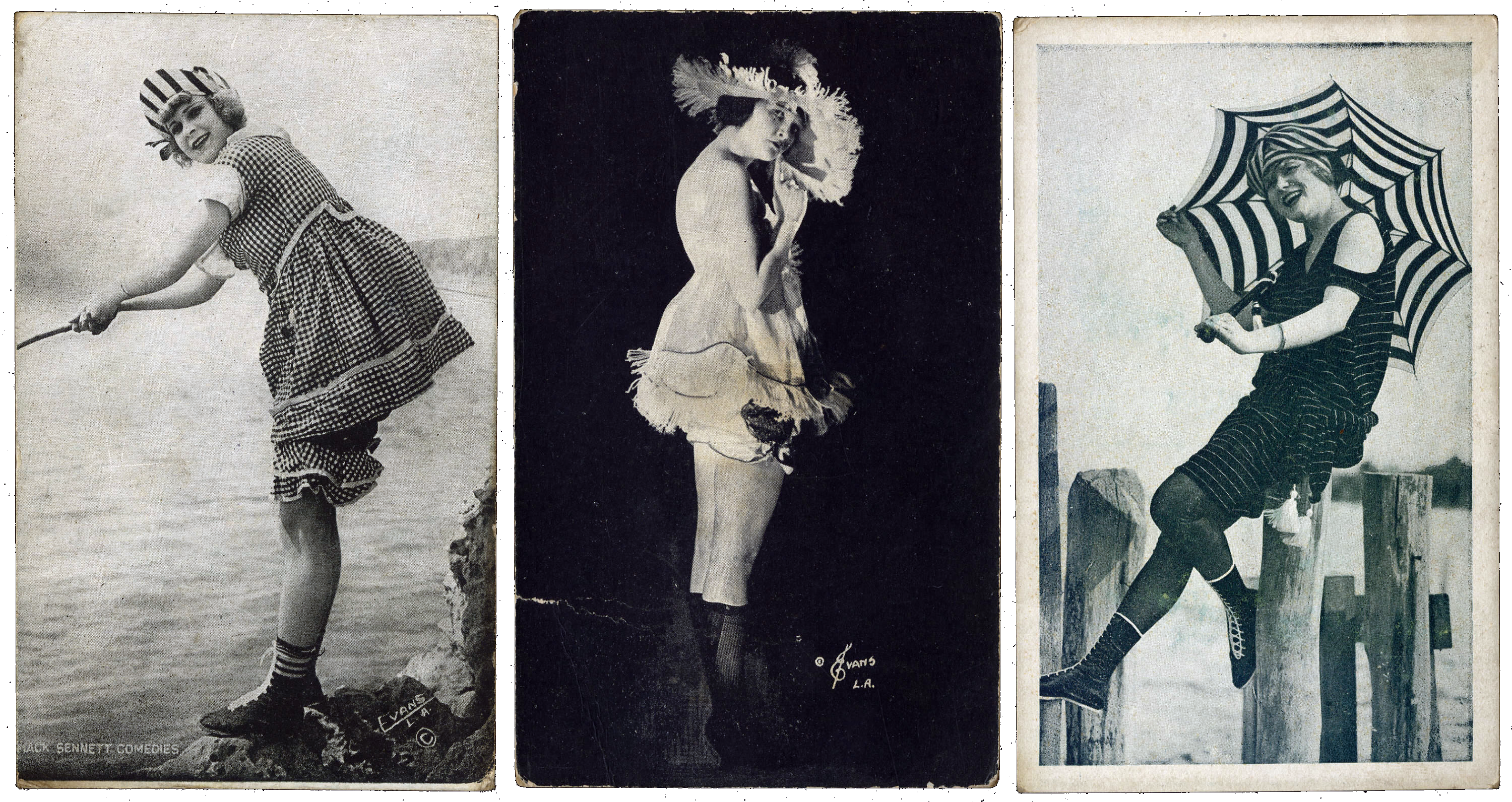
Lobby card of three Mack Sennett Bathing Beauties

Nelson Frazier Evans (June 6, 1889 – October 17, 1922) was an American photographer during the days of Old Hollywood. Evans was known for his portraits of film actors such as Darrell Foss, Marie Prevost, Louise Glaum and many others during the silent film era including director Philip Rosen. He is considered one of the creators of pin-up photography.

== Biography ==
Evans was born in Columbus, Ohio. He was the son of a coal mine operator, who objected to Evans' choice to pursue a career in photography. Initially working in the eastern United States, Evans moved to the west coast in the 1910s to pursue a career as a portrait photographer in Hollywood, eventually establishing a studio at 6039 Hollywood Boulevard in 1915. At the time, Hollywood studio photographers focused mainly on shooting movie still images of sets and scenes — actors and actresses were forced to find personal photographers to take portrait shots. This market niche was filled by professional photographers like Evans. Evans also did more traditional still photography for a number of prominent movie studios.

Evans introduced several innovations to the photography scene of Old Hollywood; he avoided using fancy props, and rendered effects or backgrounds directly on photo negatives. Evans is also credited by author and film historian David S. Shields with creating the genre of "Cheesecake Photography", a forerunner to pin-up photography. Some of Evans' full body swimsuit photographs appeared in various media, such as in magazines and on cigarette packaging.

During World War I Evans was drafted into government service and stationed in New York City. He was commissioned as a first lieutenant, and was involved with the growing field of aerial photography, for which he attempted to develop a new camera. In his personal life, Evans collected rare books; he was also noted as having been interested in religion and metaphysics.

Evans died in October 1922 at the age of 33.

=== Legacy ===
Following his death, Evans' studio was converted into an art gallery. In 1929, his studio was damaged by a fire possibly set as part of a wider vendetta against still photographers operating in Hollywood. Evans' early death resulted in him fading from memory more so than his contemporaries, such as Fred Hartsook and Albert Witzel.

== Gallery ==
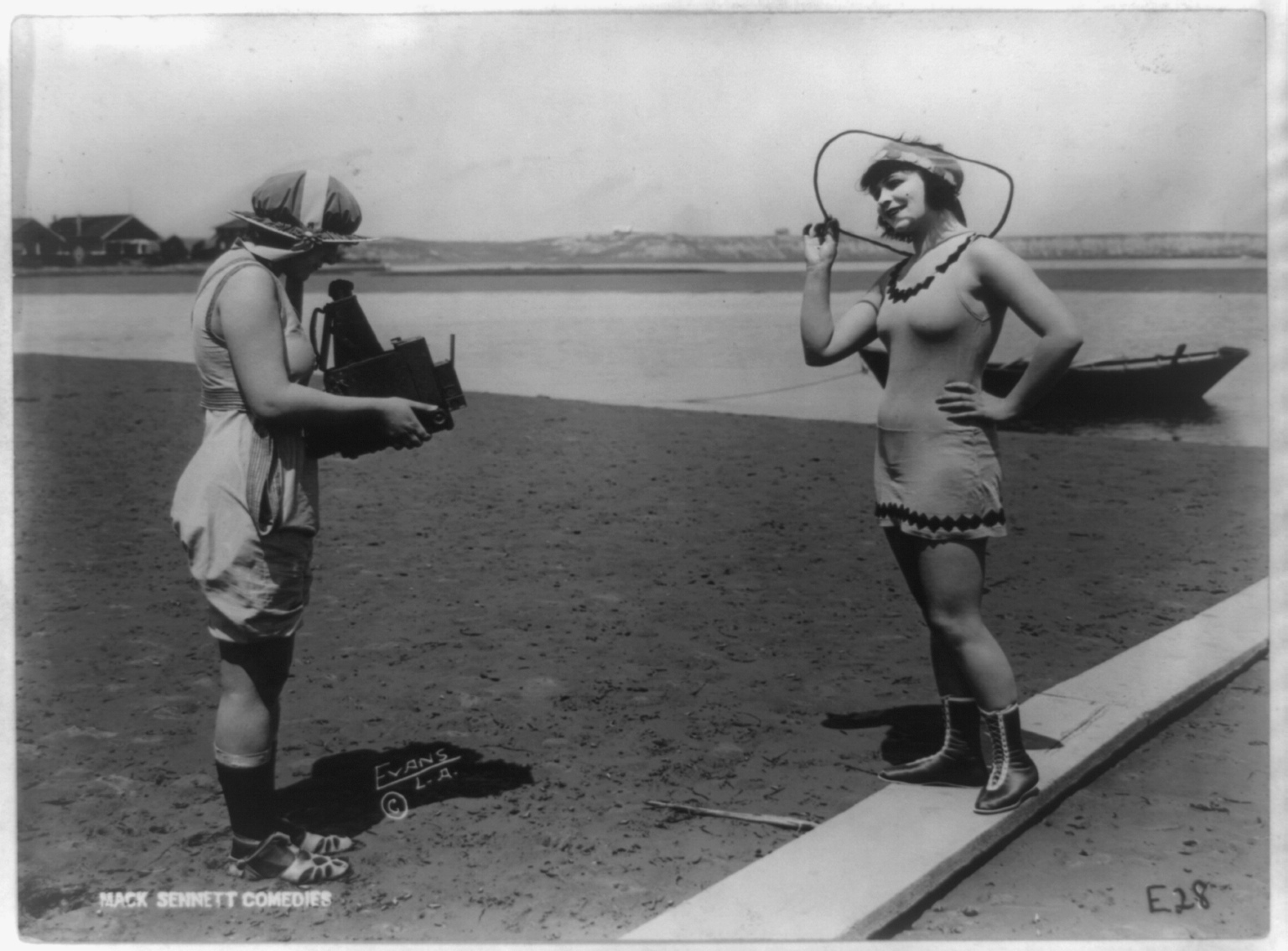
Roxana McGowan taking Mary Thurman's photograph

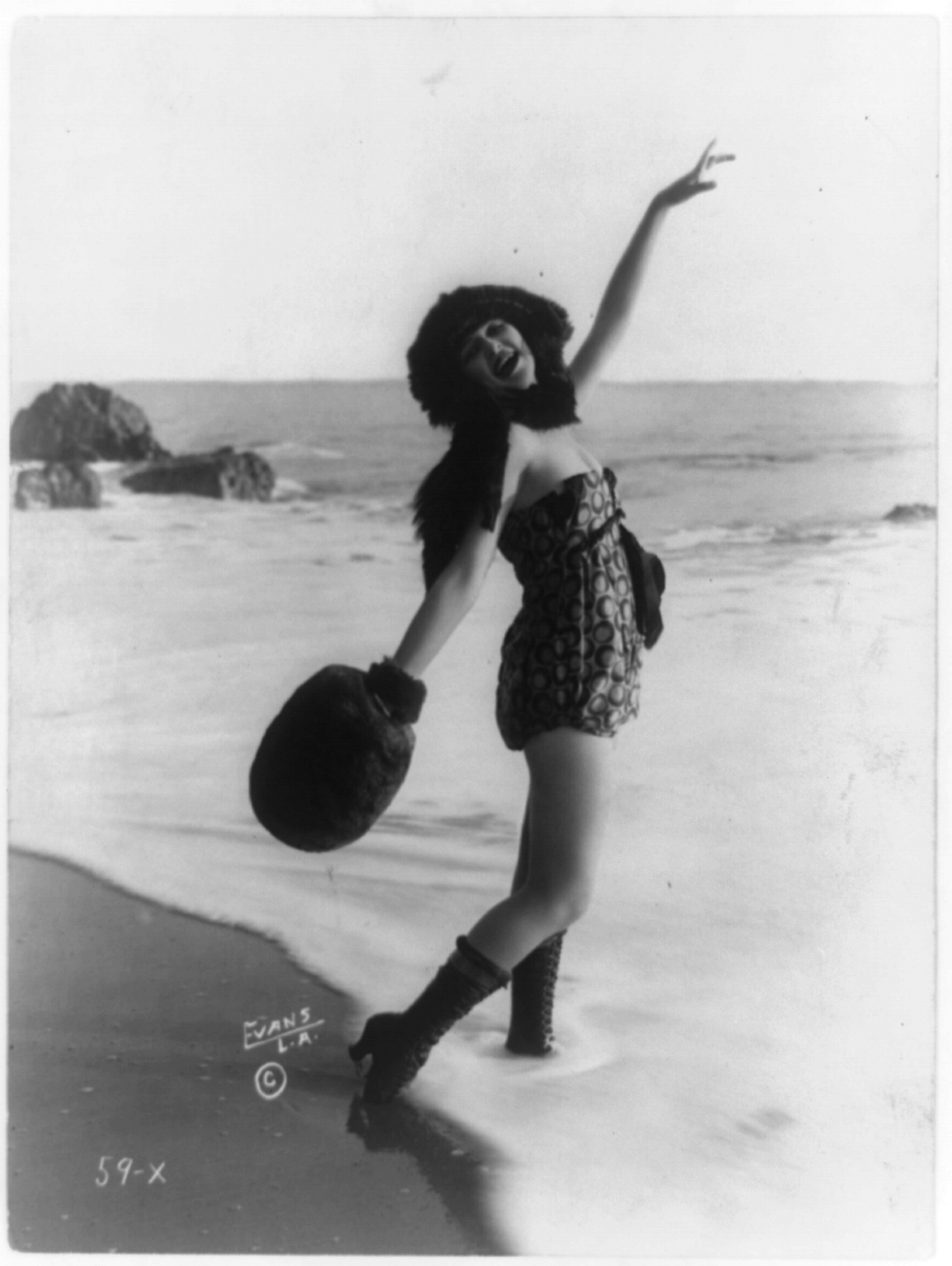
Alice Maison

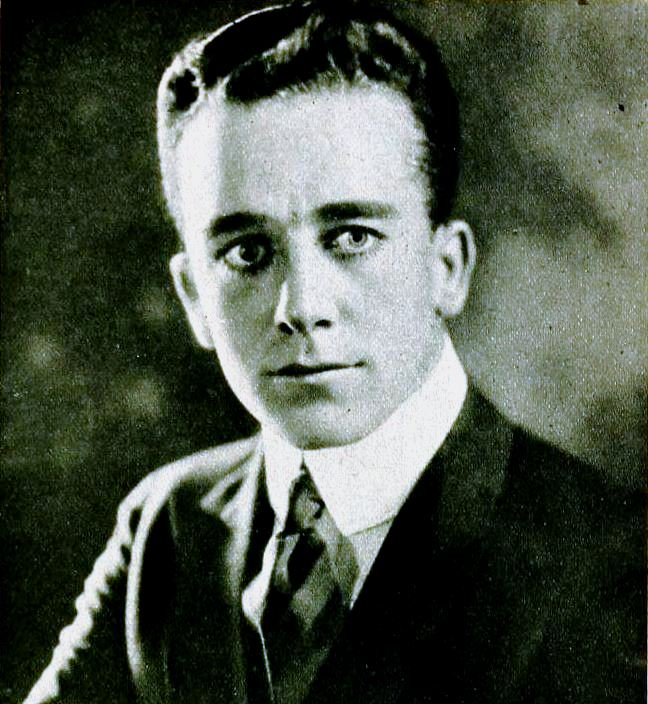
Jack Mulhall (1920)

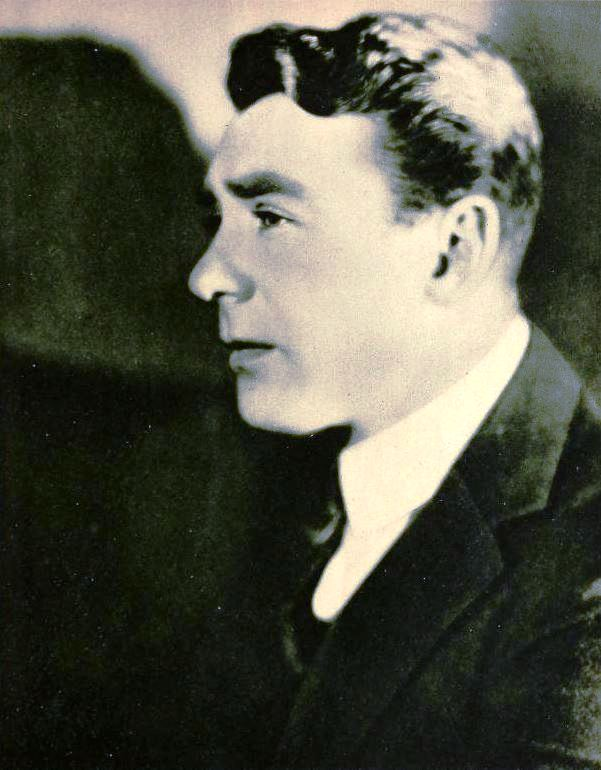
Tom Moore (actor) (1920)

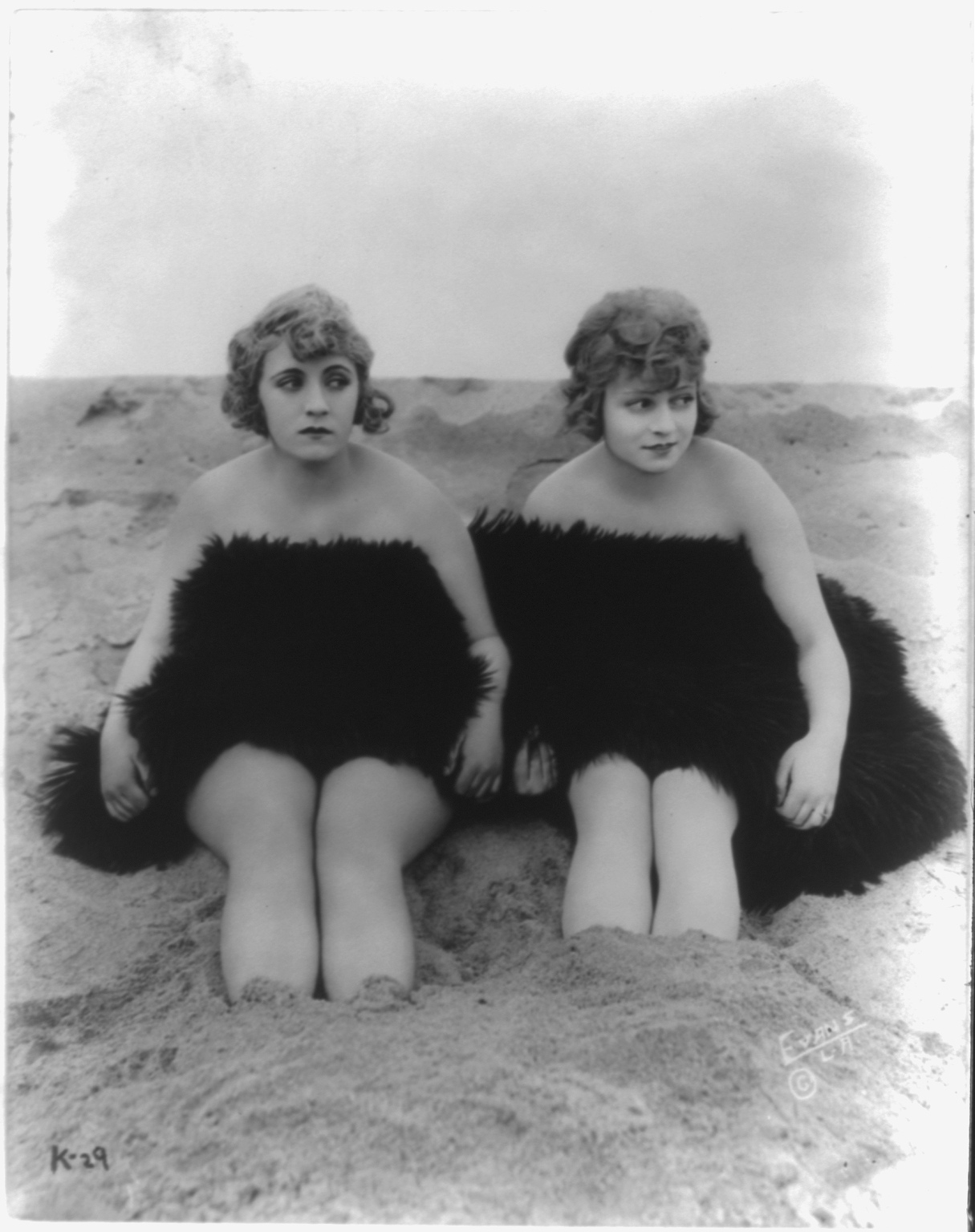
Claire Anderson and Rose Carter on the beach

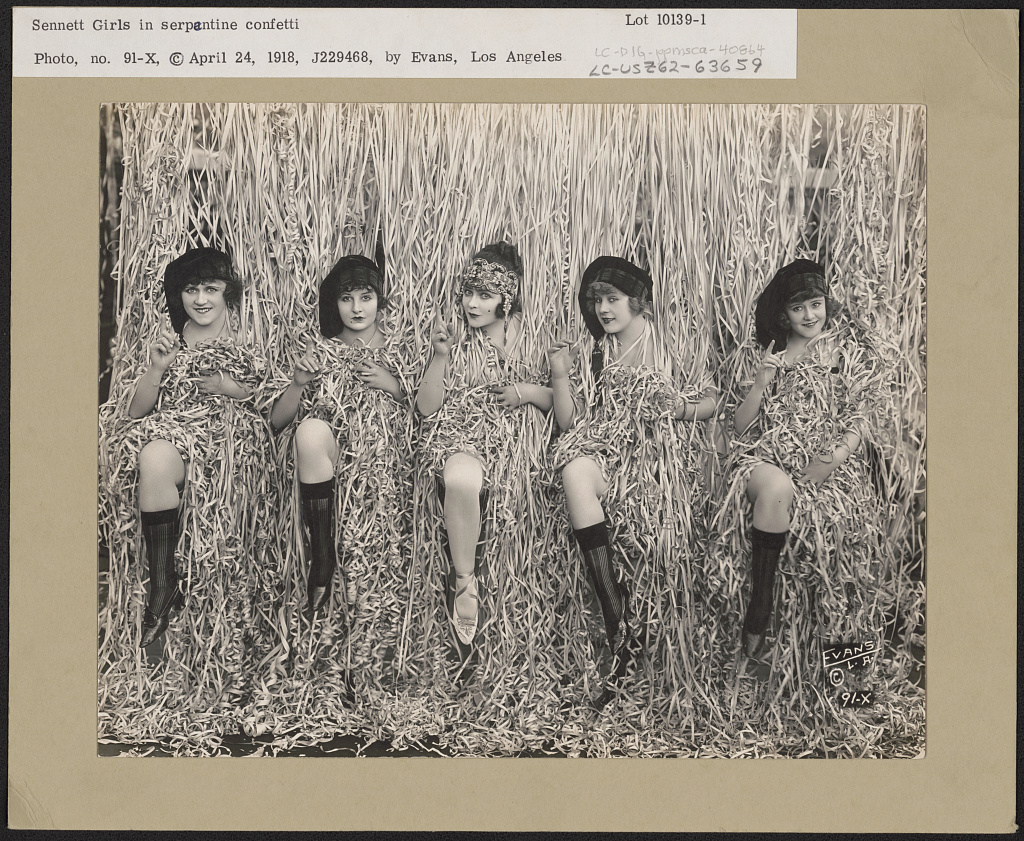
Sennett Girls in serpentine confetti

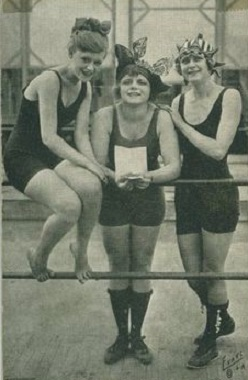
Lillian Biron, Vera Reynolds, and Teddy Sampson

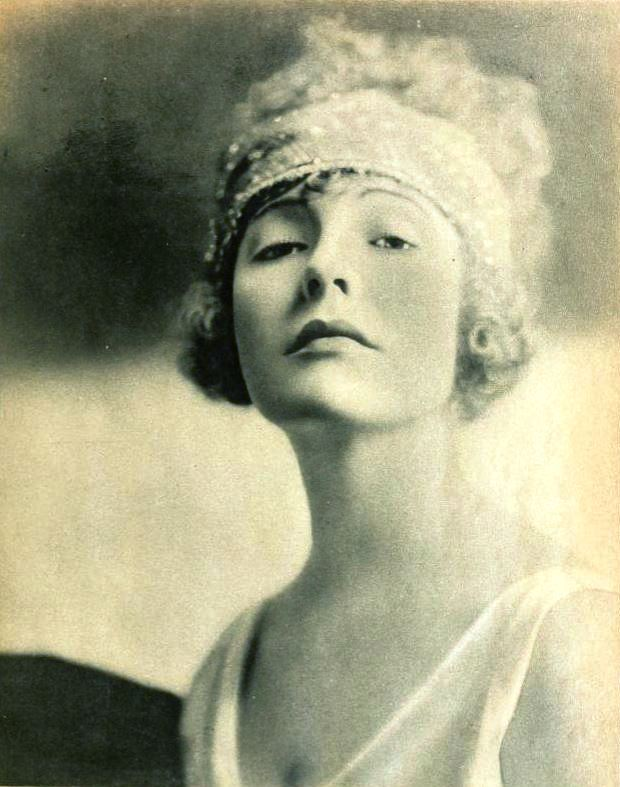
Doris Pawn (1920)

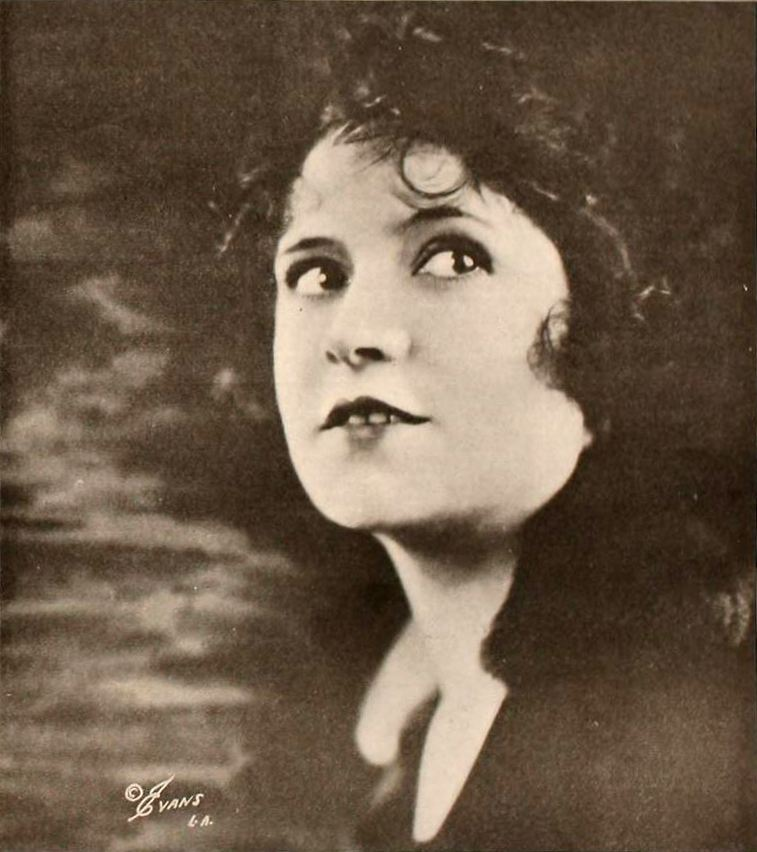
Alice Lake (1920)

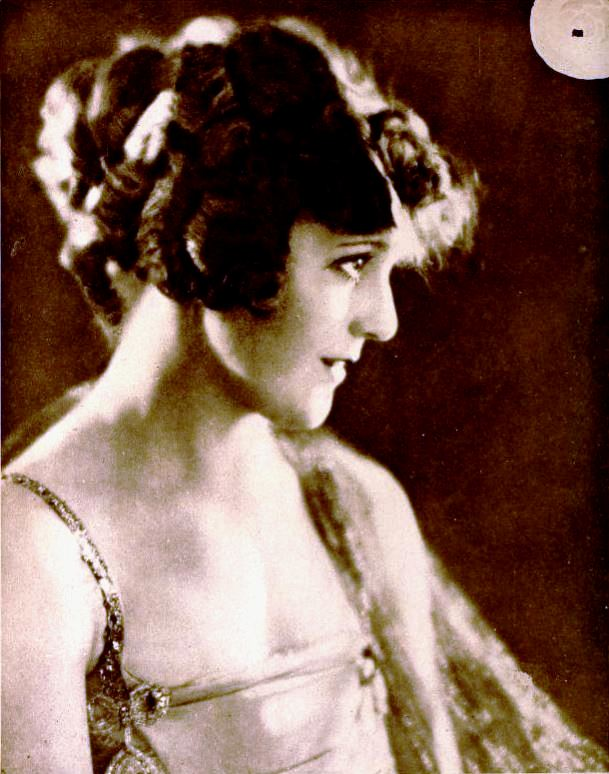
Doris May (1920)

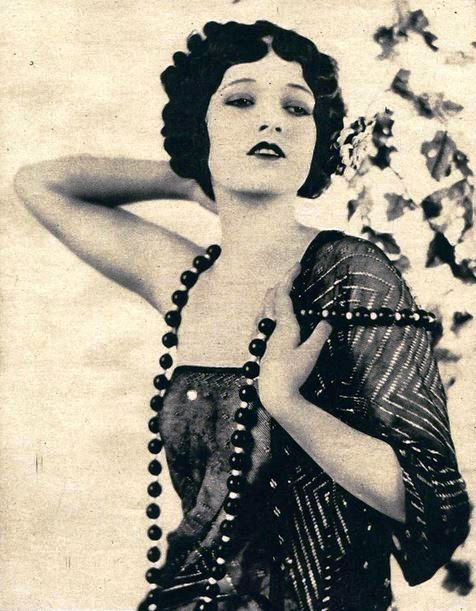
Dorothy Manners (1922)

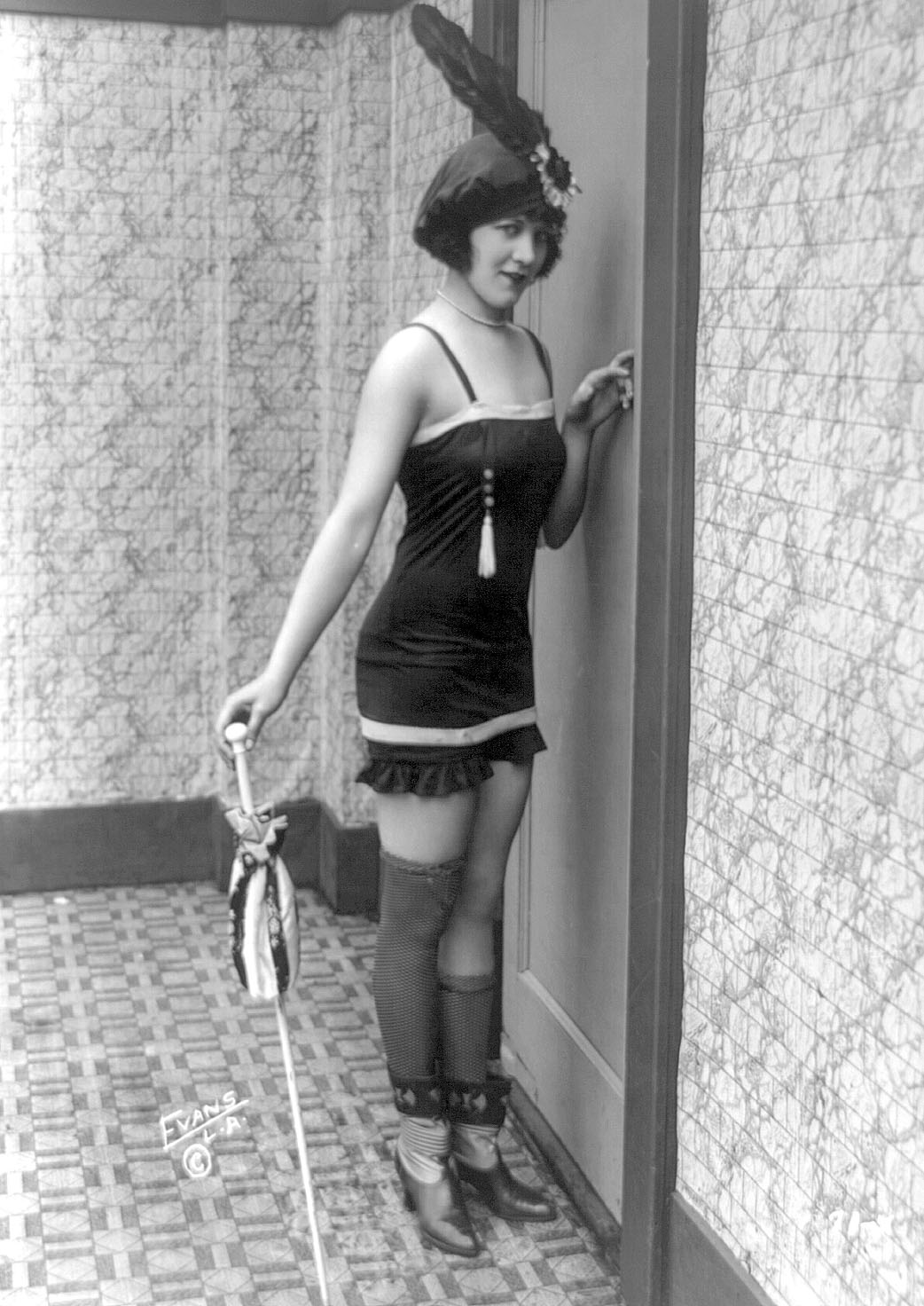
Marie Prevost

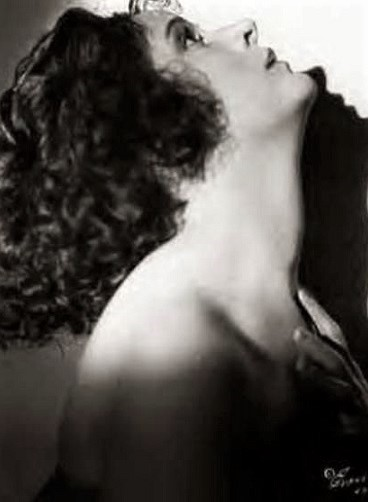
Alice Lake

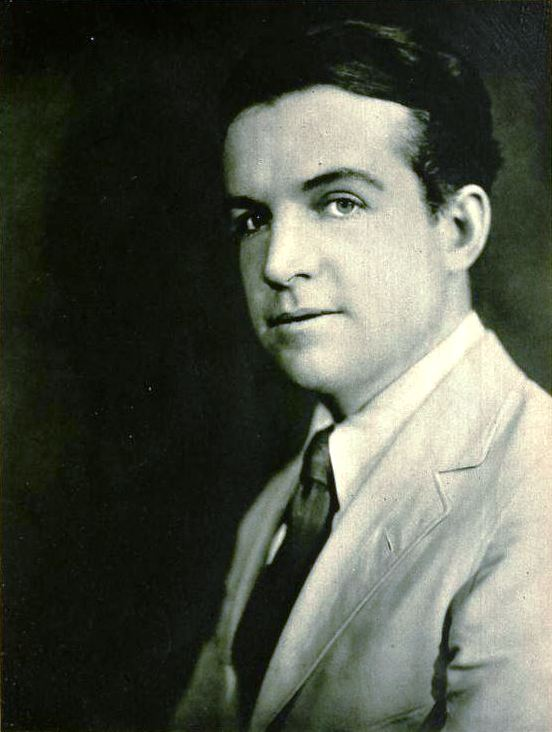
Pell Trenton (1920)

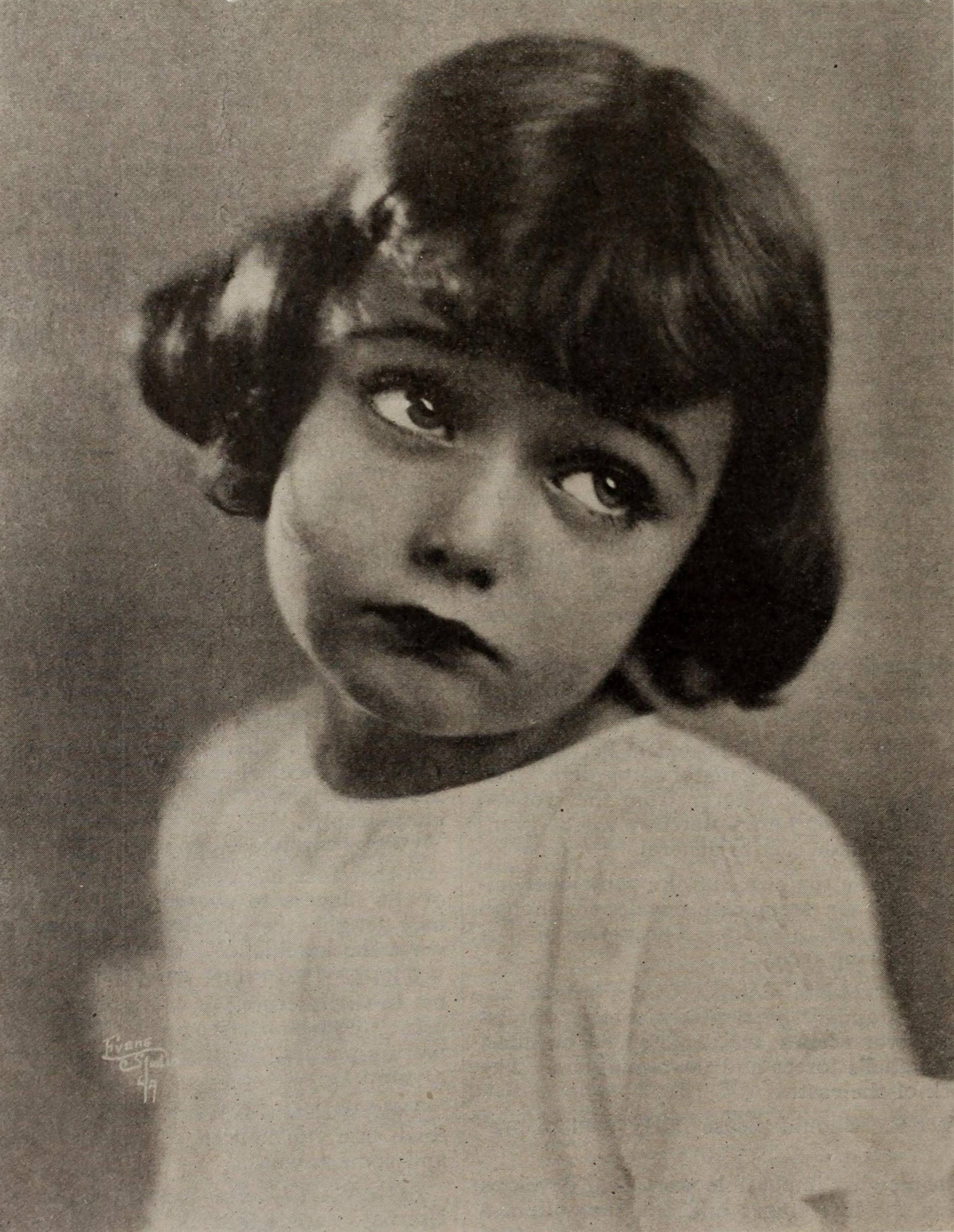
Priscilla Moran

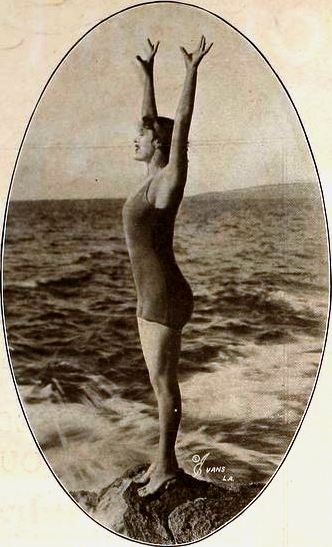
Annette Kellerman

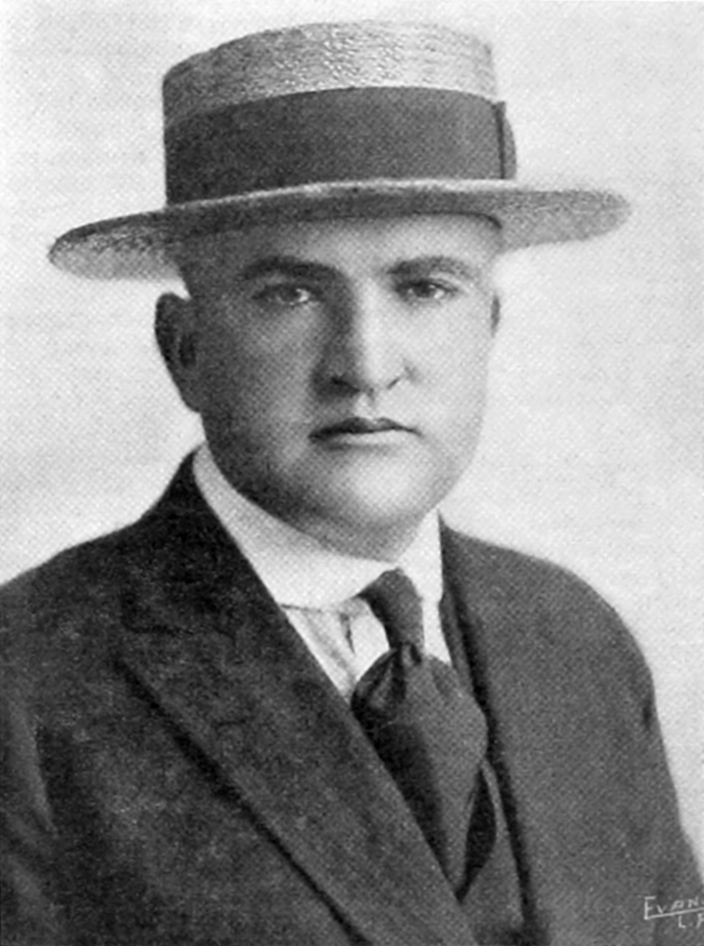
Edward F. Cline

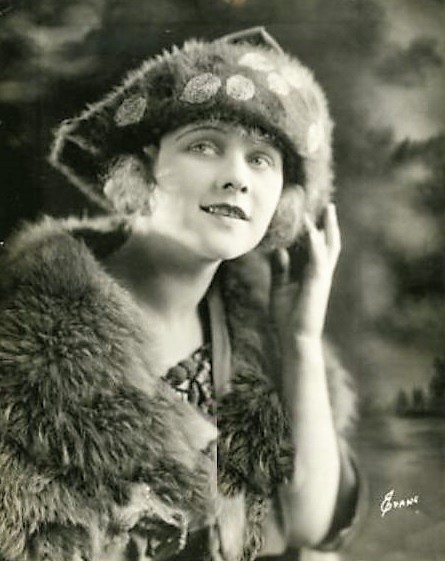
Wanda Hawley

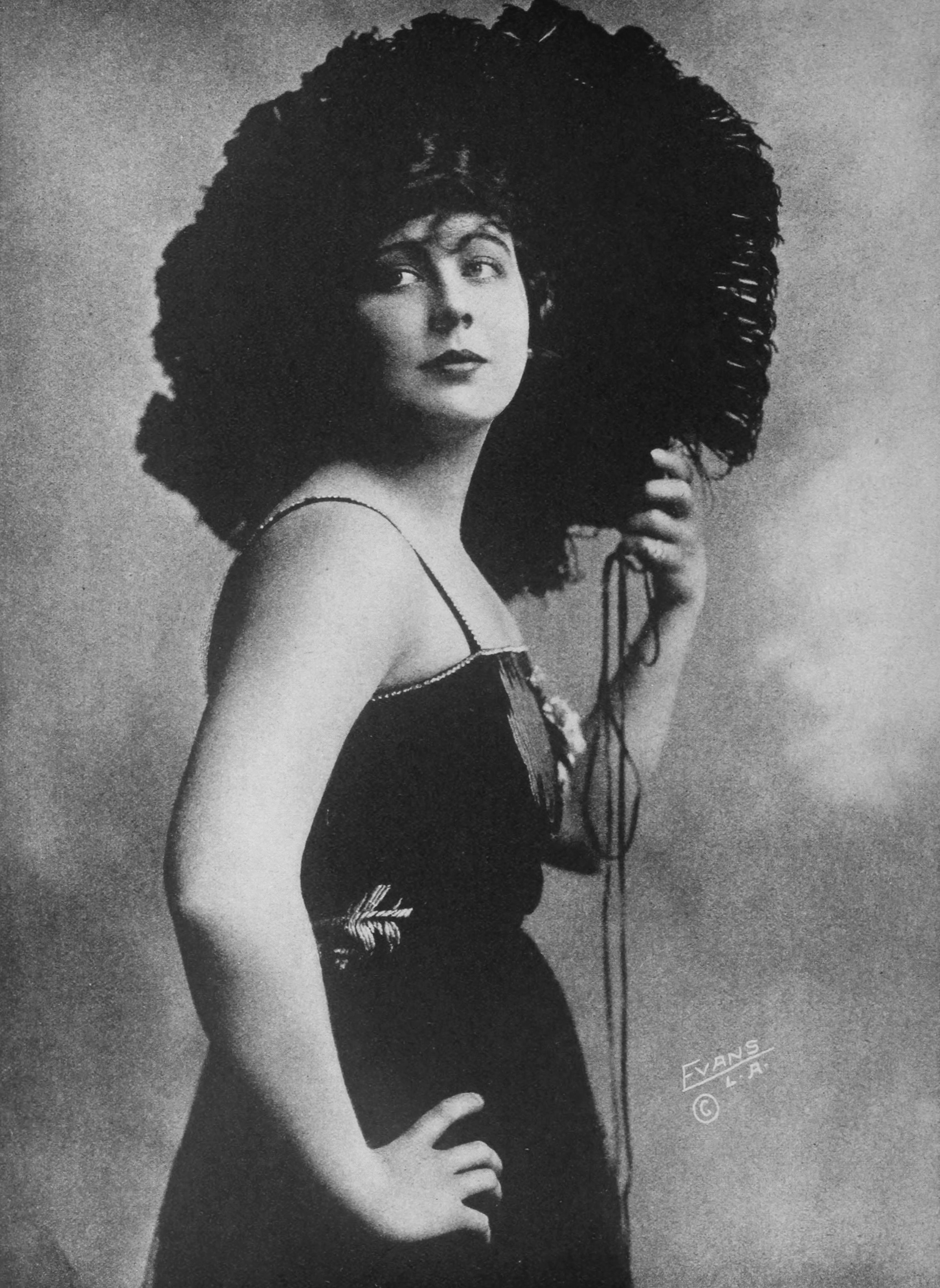
Dorothy Dalton
