= The Foolish Virgin: A Romance of Today =

1915 novel by Thomas Dixon Jr.

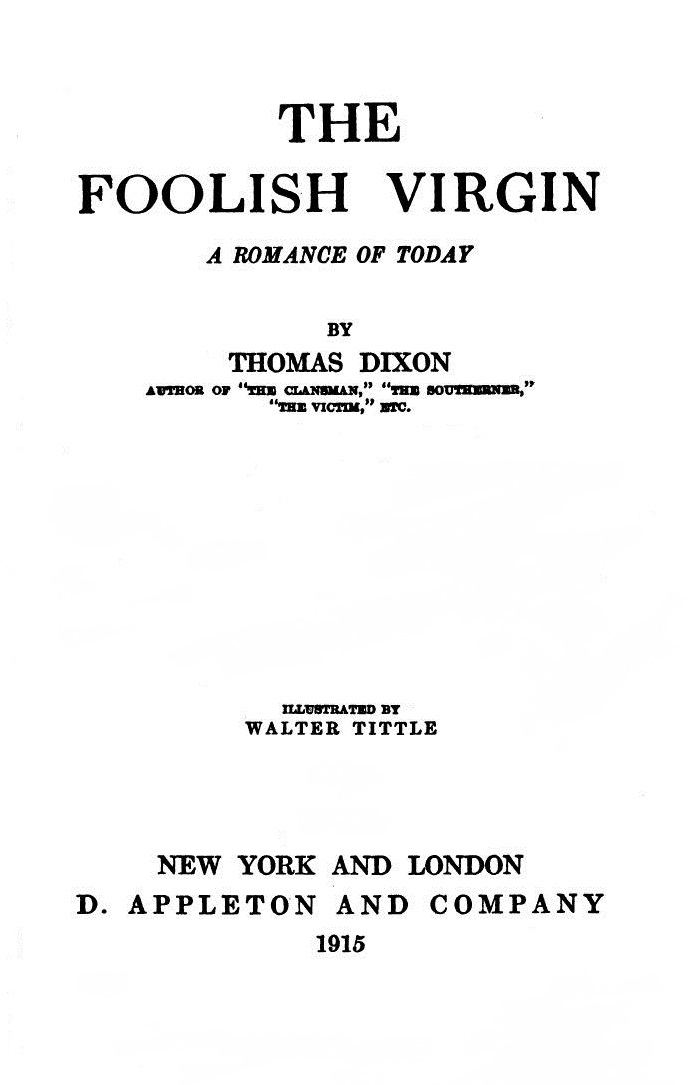
- Title page of the first edition.
- Authors: Thomas Dixon Jr.
- Language: English
- Publisher: D. Appleton and Company
- Publication date: 1915
- Pages: 352

The Foolish Virgin: A Romance of Today is a 1915 novel by Thomas Dixon Jr.

== Plot summary ==
Mary Adams, a schoolteacher in New York City, dreams of finding a husband. She starts a relationship with Jim Anthony, a criminal she meets at the New York Public Library.

Mary and Jim visit North Carolina to meet Anthony's mother. Now a drunk, she tries to murder her son in order to retrieve the valuables from his suitcase that he has stolen. Mary escapes when she finds out about Anthony's criminal activities, and she is rescued by a physician. She is pregnant with Jim's son. Later, he returns his stolen items, builds a family home for his wife and son, and promises to get a job and provide for his family.

The book title is taken from the Christian parable of the Wise and Foolish Virgins.

== Main theme ==
The novel is a criticism of the emancipation of women.

== Critical reception ==
In a January 1916 review for Bookman, critic P. G. Hulbert Jr. argued that the ending of the novel was absurd.

Biographer Anthony Slide has suggested that there is 'a vague hint of eugenics' when Mary is worried that her son may inherit Jim's criminal propensions. He added, 'It is not Jim who is the hero here, or even the friendly doctor, but rather the South. The South has a regenerative effect on Jim and helps cure him of the ills—that is, crime—that he developed in New York.'

== Cinematic adaptations ==
The film rights were purchased by the Clara Kimball Young Film Corporation, headed by actress Clara Kimball Young and Lewis J. Selznick. Filming began in August 1916. The film received good reviews in the Motion Picture News, the Exhibitor's Trade Review and the Evening Express.

Another cinematic adaptation was released in 1924. Directed by George W. Hill, it starred Elaine Hammerstein and Robert Frazer. The storyline was strayed from the novel, and the film received bad reviews in Variety and Photoplay.
