= The Phantom Fortune =

1923 film

- Directed by: Robert F. Hill
- Written by: Anthony Coldeway; George Hively
- Starring: William Desmond; Esther Ralston
- Distributed by: Universal Pictures
- Release date: March 19, 1923
- Running time: 12 episodes
- Country: United States
- Languages: Silent; English intertitles

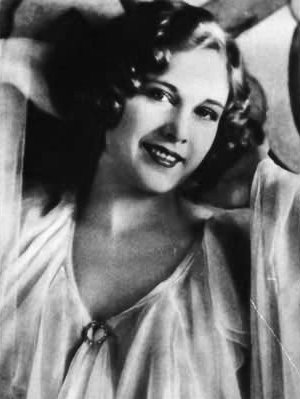
Esther Ralston from Stars of the Photoplay

The Phantom Fortune is a 1923 American silent Western film serial directed by Robert F. Hill. It is thought to be lost.

== Cast ==
- William Desmond as Larry Barclay
- Esther Ralston as Mary Rogers
- Lewis Sargent as Speck O'Dawn
- Harry De Vere as Graham Alexander
- George Webb as Alexander Owens
- Cathleen Calhoun as Nadine Hamilton
- Al Hart as The Flame (as Albert Hart)
- Dick Sutherland as The Ox
- George Nichols
- Jack Henderson
- Pat Harmon
- Tony West
- Alfred Hollingsworth

== See also ==
- List of film serials
- List of film serials by studio
- List of lost films
