= Jack Henderson (actor) =

American actor (1877–1957)

- Publicity Photo of Jack Henderson
- Born: David John Henderson; 14 May 1877
- Died: 1 January 1957 (aged 79)
- Occupation: Actor

David John Henderson (14 May 1877 – 1 January 1957) was an American silent film actor.

Jack Henderson was born on 14 May 1877 or 1878 in Syracuse, New York.

Henderson acted with Charlie Chaplin at Essanay Studios in Los Angeles from October 1915, and continued with him at Mutual.

Henderson died on 1 January 1957 in New York City.

== Partial filmography ==
- Burlesque on Carmen (1915)
- A Dash of Courage (1916)
- A Royal Rogue (1917)
- Scars and Bars (1918)
- Hearts in Hock (1919)
- A Roman Scandal (1919)
- Jiggs in Society (1920)
- The Phantom Fortune (1923)
- The Foolish Virgin (1924)
- Lightning Bill (1926)
- A Captain's Courage (1926)
- Thunderbolt's Tracks (1927)
- Tracked (1928)
- Taking a Chance (1928)
- Little Men (1940)
