= The Saphead =

1920 film

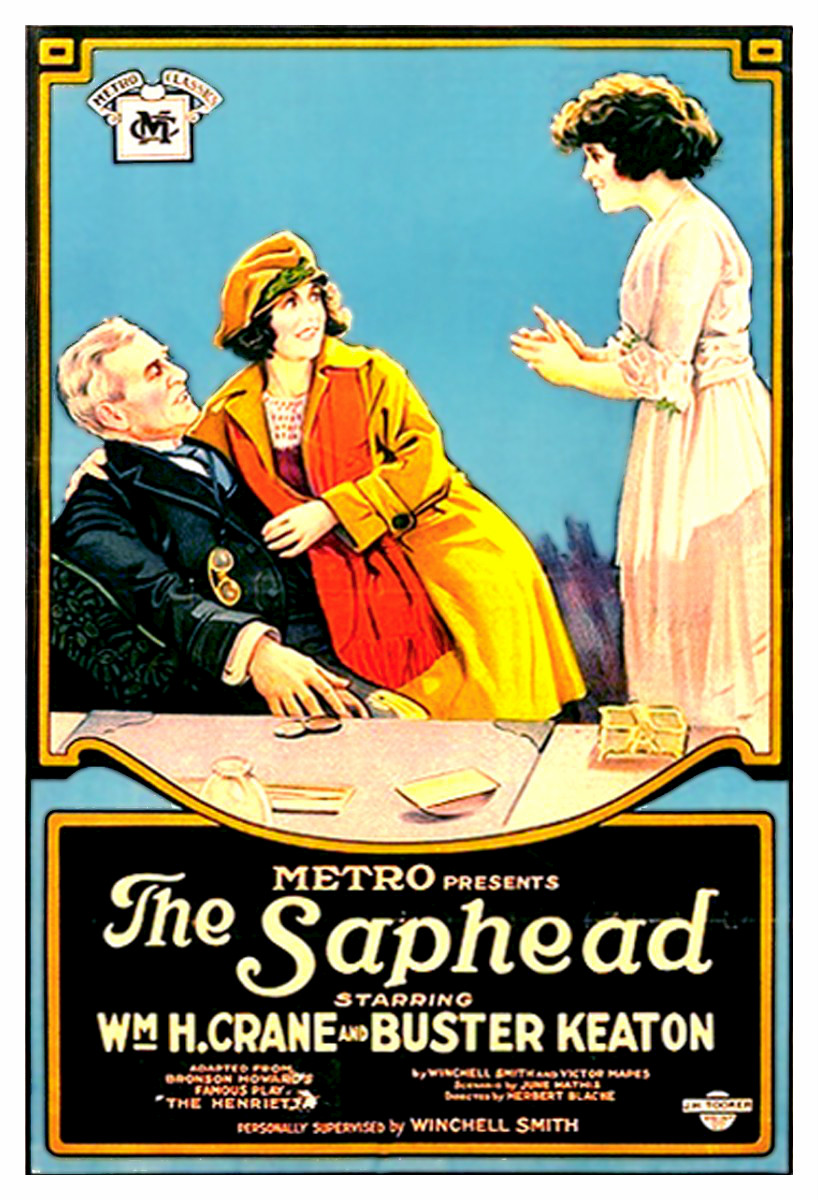
- Film poster
- Directed by: Herbert Blaché; Winchell Smith
- Written by: Buster Keaton; Bronson Howard; Victor Mapes; June Mathis; Winchell Smith
- Produced by: John Golden; Marcus Loew; Winchell Smith
- Starring: Buster Keaton; Beulah Booker
- Cinematography: Harold Wenstrom
- Production company: Metro Pictures
- Distributed by: Metro Pictures
- Release date: October 18, 1920
- Running time: 77 minutes
- Country: United States
- Language: Silent (English intertitles)

The Saphead is a 1920 American comedy-drama film featuring Buster Keaton. It was the actor's first starring role in a full-length feature and the film that launched his career as a leading man. Keaton was cast on the recommendation of Douglas Fairbanks.

The plot was a merging of two stories, Bronson Howard's 1887 play The Henrietta and the 1913 play based on Howard's comedy, The New Henrietta by Victor Mapes and Winchell Smith, which was meant to be an adaption of Howard's play.

The Saphead

== Plot ==
Nicholas Van Alstyne is the richest man in New York, but he is very disappointed in the behavior of his son, Bertie, who stays out all night gambling and partying, and who seems to show no talent or interest in work. In fact, Bertie is feigning this behavior because he believes it will help to impress the girl of his dreams, his adopted sister Agnes. Unfortunately, it helps him to do nothing more than get disowned by his father.

Bertie's sister, Rose, is married to an unsuccessful lawyer named Mark Turner, who is admired by Van Alstyne but in fact is a troublemaker. He has a mistress named Henrietta and an illegitimate child with her. When Henrietta dies after a long illness, a letter is sent to him informing him about the present circumstances. Mark claims the letter is actually Bertie's, who goes along with the lie to protect his sister, breaking Agnes heart and ensuring Van Alstyne never wants to speak to his son again.

Soon after, when Van Alstyne goes away on business, he leaves Mark in charge of running the family's finances, but Mark plots to claim the family fortunes himself by selling off all their shares of stock. Bertie inadvertently saves the day by buying back all of the stock without realizing what he is doing. When Van Alstyne sees what has happened he forgives Bertie and allows him to marry Agnes. Mark, meanwhile, conveniently dies of a heart attack when he realizes that his scheme has failed. The film ends a year later, with the birth of Bertie and Agnes' twin children.

== Cast ==
- Buster Keaton as Bertie 'The Lamb' Van Alstyne
- Beulah Booker as Agnes Gates
- Edward Connelly as Musgrave
- Edward Jobson as Rev. Murray Hilton
- Edward Alexander as Watson Flint
- Odette Tyler as Mrs. Cornelia Opdyke
- Carol Holloway as Rose Turner
- Irving Cummings as Mark Turner
- Jack Livingston as Dr. George Wainright
- William H. Crane as Nicholas Van Alstyne
- Katherine Albert as Hattie (uncredited)
- Henry Clauss as Valet (uncredited)
- Alfred Hollingsworth as Hathaway (uncredited)
- Jeffrey Williams as Hutchins (uncredited)
- Helen Holte as Henrietta (uncredited)

== Production ==
Douglas Fairbanks had played the role of Bertie in the original stage production, but was already committed to his own film project when he was approached about the film adaptation. Instead, Fairbanks recommended Keaton for the role with his confident reassurances that the comedian would be appropriate.

== Reception ==
Buster Keaton's performance in the film was singled out as having an unusual stillness for his character that gave him a distinctive presence on screen. For instance, Variety noted that "his quiet work in this picture is a revelation." As such, Keaton's work on such a prestigious film gained him credibility as an actor.

== See also ==
- Buster Keaton filmography
