= Pagan Passions =

1924 film

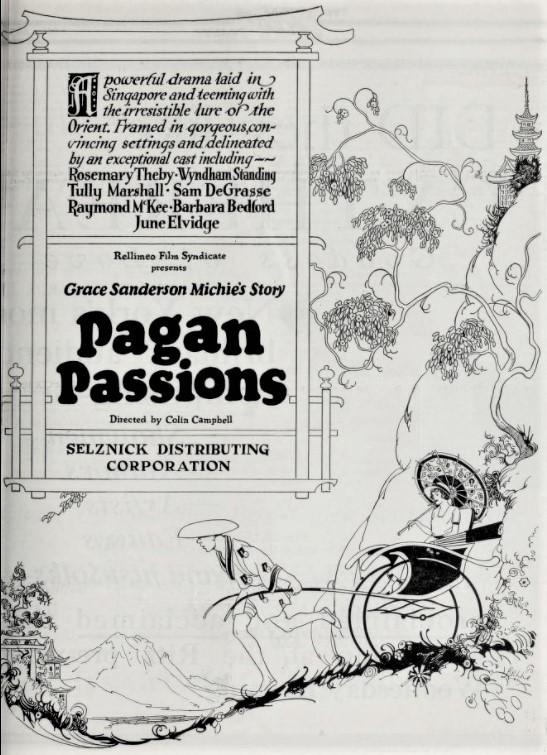
- Advertisement
- Directed by: Colin Campbell
- Written by: Grace Sanderson Michie (story)
- Starring: Wyndham Standing; June Elvidge; Barbara Bedford
- Cinematography: [Joseph Brotherton
- Production company: Rellimeo Film Syndicate
- Distributed by: Selznick Pictures
- Release date: March 1924
- Running time: 6 reels
- Country: United States
- Language: Silent (English intertitles)

Pagan Passions is a lost 1924 American silent drama film directed by Colin Campbell and starring Wyndham Standing, June Elvidge, and Barbara Bedford.

== Plot ==
As described in a film magazine review, when her husband commits suicide, Dreka Langley leaves her new-born baby with a family in China and falls in love with John Dangerfield, a married man. The two live in the Chinese underworld and Mrs. Dangerfield obtains a divorce. Years later, Dangerfield reforms and seeks seclusion in a Chinese monastery, where he meets and adopts Billy, who is the boy that was deserted by Dreka. Billy is sent to an American college where he meets and falls in love with Shirley, who is Dangerfield's daughter. Billy believes his supposed half-caste nationality is a bar to their marriage, which is removed when Dreka, before dying, identifies Billy as her son. Dangerfield wins back his wife and all ends well.

== Cast ==
- Wyndham Standing as John Dangerfield
- June Elvidge as Mrs. Dangerfield
- Barbara Bedford as Shirley Dangerfield
- Raymond McKee as Billy Dangerfield
- Sam De Grasse as Frank Langley
- Rosemary Theby as Dreka Langley
- Tully Marshall as Dr. Trask
- Dick Brandon as Little Boy (uncredited)

== Preservation ==
With no copies of Pagan Passions located in any film archives, it is a lost film.

== Bibliography ==
- Goble, Alan. The Complete Index to Literary Sources in Film. Walter de Gruyter, 1999. ISBN 9783598114922
