= Beulah Booker =

American actress (1899–1973)

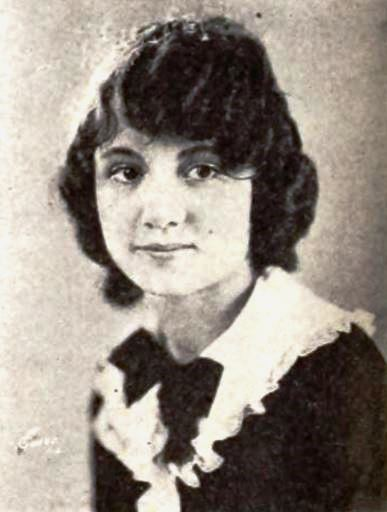
- Beulah Booker, from a 1920 publication
- Born: Beulah Elizabeth Booker; December 27, 1899; Silverton, Colorado, U.S.
- Died: September 17, 1973 (age 73); Oceanside, California, U.S.
- Other names: Beulah Booker O'Hara, Beulah Booker O'Farrell
- Occupation: Actress

Beulah Elizabeth Booker (December 27, 1899 – September 17, 1973) was an American actress in silent films.

== Early life and education ==
Booker was born in Silverton, Colorado, the daughter of William Edward Booker and Marguerite "Gretchen" E. Brendel Booker. Her father was an English-born railroad engineer. She had an older brother, Lawrence.

== Career ==
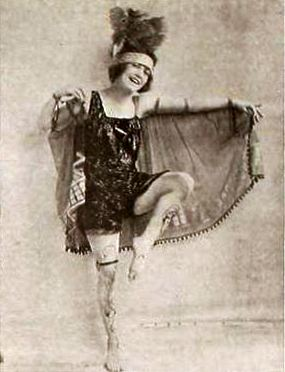
Beulah Booker in My Lady's Ankle (1920)

Booker, billed as "Little Miss Booker", had a short career in Hollywood, appearing in several films and shorts between 1917 and 1920. Her most prominent role was as Buster Keaton's love interest in his feature film debut, The Saphead (1920).

Beyond acting, Booker was interested in aviation, helped at a benefit canteen for war relief in 1918, and modeled with art and fresh produce for the Los Angeles Express. She entertained disabled veterans of World War I at a military hospital in 1920.

== Films ==
- Officer Jerry and Jerry's Big Deal (1917, shorts), with George Ovey
- The Finger of Justice (1918)
- The Boomerang (1919)
- Tempest Cody, Kidnapper (1919)
- The Dwelling Place of Light (1920), based on a novel by Winston Churchill
- The Saphead (1920), also known as The New Henrietta
- My Lady's Ankle (1920, short)
- The Ransom of Mack (1920, short)
- Monsieur Couperin (1920)

== Personal life ==
Booker married twice. Her first husband was screenwriter and aviator Kenneth Anthony O'Hara; they married in 1918 and divorced in 1919. Her second husband was Thomas O'Farrell; they married in 1925, and lived in Newport Beach, Modjeska, and Encinitas. She died in 1973, at the age of 73, in Oceanside, California.
