= The Foolish Virgin =

1924 film directed by George W. Hill

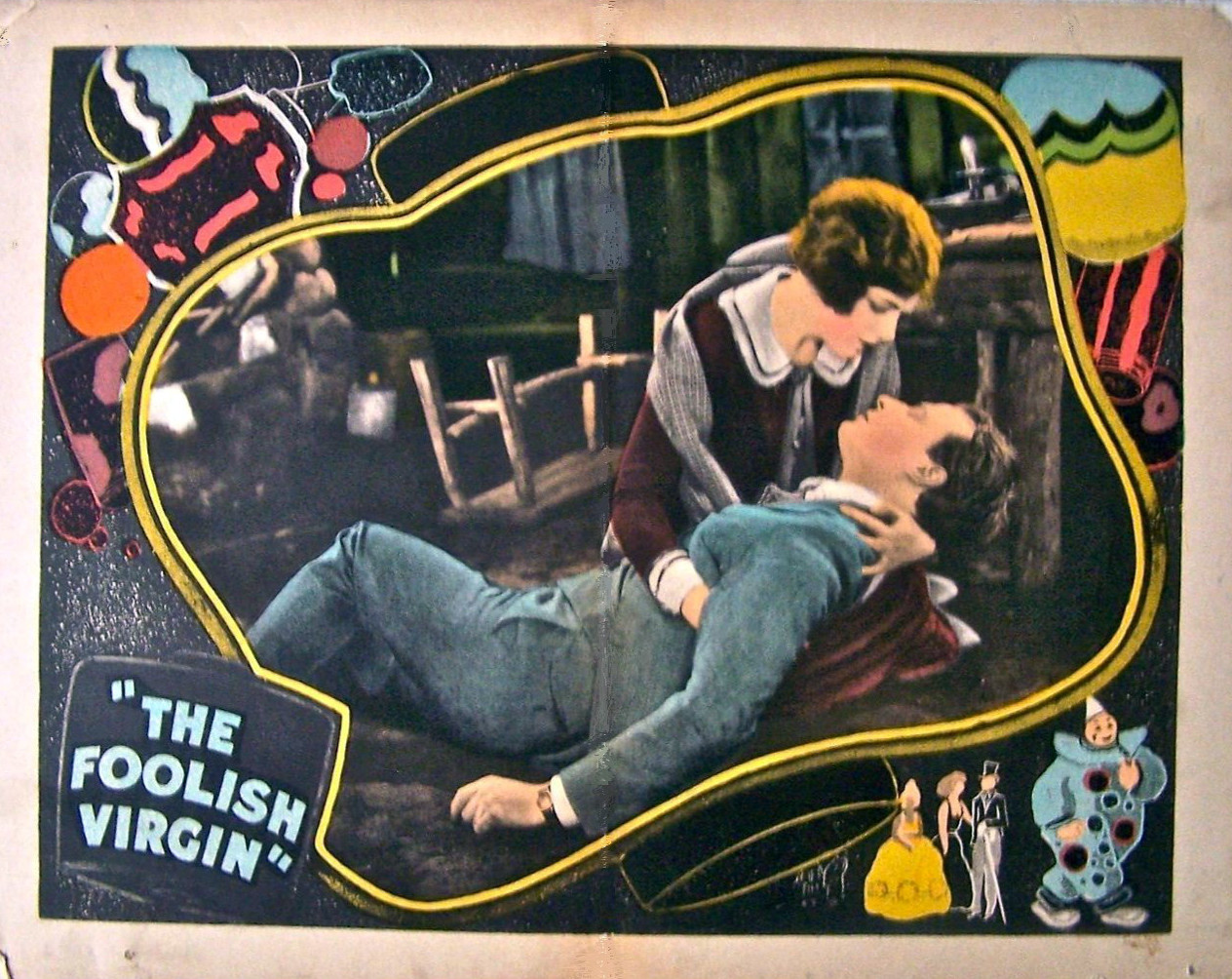
- Lobby card
- Directed by: George W. Hill
- Written by: Lois Zellner
- Based on: The Foolish Virgin: A Romance of Today by Thomas Dixon Jr.
- Starring: Elaine Hammerstein
- Cinematography: Norbert Brodine
- Distributed by: Columbia Pictures
- Release date: August 15, 1924
- Running time: 6 reels
- Country: United States
- Language: Silent (English intertitles)

The Foolish Virgin is a lost 1924 American silent romantic drama film released by Columbia Pictures. It was directed by George W. Hill and stars Elaine Hammerstein. It is based on the 1915 novel The Foolish Virgin: A Romance of Today by Thomas Dixon Jr. This is the second known adaptation of the novel; the first was released in 1916.

== Plot ==
Jim Owens (Frazer) rescues Mary Adams (Hammerstein) from a scheming lawyer. Jim is successful inventor, however Mary is unaware that he has a history as a thief before they met. They fall in love and get married. Mary leaves Jim when she discovers his criminal history. In the end Jim rescues Mary and their child from a forest fire, renewing Mary's love for Jim. The 1924 plot notably differs from the book and the 1916 film. In the earlier versions Jim's thievery continued during the marriage, and only he reformed his ways after losing Mary.

== Cast ==
- Elaine Hammerstein as Mary Adams
- Robert Frazer as Jim Owens / Eiphann Owens
- Gladys Brockwell as Nance Owens
- Phyllis Haver as Jane Sanderson
- Lloyd Whitlock as Charles Spencer
- Irene Hunt as Mrs. Dawson
- Howard Truesdale as Dr. Dawson
- Jack Henderson as Sam Allen
- Roscoe Karns as Chuck Brady
- Oliver Cross as Lawson Howard
- Edward W. Borman as Dan O'Leary (credited as Edward Borman)
- Spec O'Donnell as Little Boy
- Billy Seay as Jim Owens as a Boy (uncredited)

== Critical reception ==
While Variety magazine in 1924 wrote that "It should please the average audience", in 1925 Photoplay magazine described The Foolish Virgin as "silly, uninteresting, tiresome".
