= The Kaiser's Shadow =

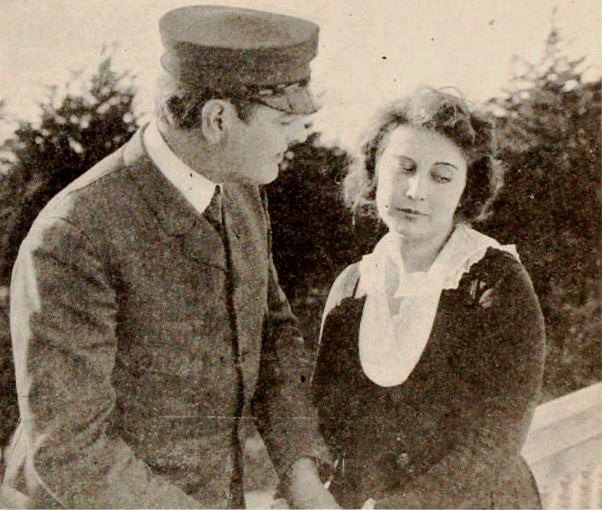
- Film still
- Directed by: Roy William Neill
- Screenplay by: Octavus Roy Cohen; John Ulrich Giesy
- Produced by: Thomas H. Ince
- Starring: Dorothy Dalton; Thurston Hall; Edward Cecil; Leota Lorraine; Otto Hoffman; Charles K. French
- Cinematography: John Stumar
- Production company: Thomas H. Ince Corporation
- Distributed by: Paramount Pictures
- Release date: July 1, 1918
- Running time: 50 minutes
- Country: United States
- Language: English

The Kaiser's Shadow is a 1918 American silent drama film directed by Roy William Neill and written by Octavus Roy Cohen and J.U. Giesy. The film stars Dorothy Dalton, Thurston Hall, Edward Cecil, Leota Lorraine, Otto Hoffman, and Charles K. French. The film was released on July 1, 1918, by Paramount Pictures. It is not known whether the film currently survives.

== Plot ==
As described in a film magazine, a love affair between Paula Harris and Hugo Wagner, begun in Wilhemstrasse, continues in America where the two, as German spies, obtain employment in the home of Dorothy Robinson, fiancé of Clement Boyd, an inventor who perfected a rifle. On their wedding day Clement and Dorothy are spirited away to the home of Professor Fredeerick Fischer, a cog in the German spy system. A search of Clement fails to find the plans for the rifle, and Hugo and Paula, who conducted the abduction, are told that they bungled it and will have to answer to "his excellence". The torture of Clement by "his excellence" is halted when Paula tears the mask from his face, exposing William Kremlin, a respected citizen. Men from the U.S. secret service arrive and the leaders of the band are killed while the others are taken into custody. Subsequent revelations show that Paula and Hugo were actually both in the service of the Allies and their romance culminates.

== Cast ==
- Dorothy Dalton as Paula Harris
- Thurston Hall as Hugo Wagner
- Edward Cecil as Clement Boyd
- Leota Lorraine as Dorothy Robinson
- Otto Hoffman as Fredeerick Fischer
- Charles K. French as William Kremlin

== Reception ==
Like many American films of the time, The Kaiser's Shadow was subject to cuts by city and state film censorship boards. For example, the Chicago Board of Censors cut, in Reel 2, three scenes of chloroforming a young woman and, in Reel 5, the shooting of a police officer.
