= Come Through (film) =

1917 American silent crime film directed by Jack Conway

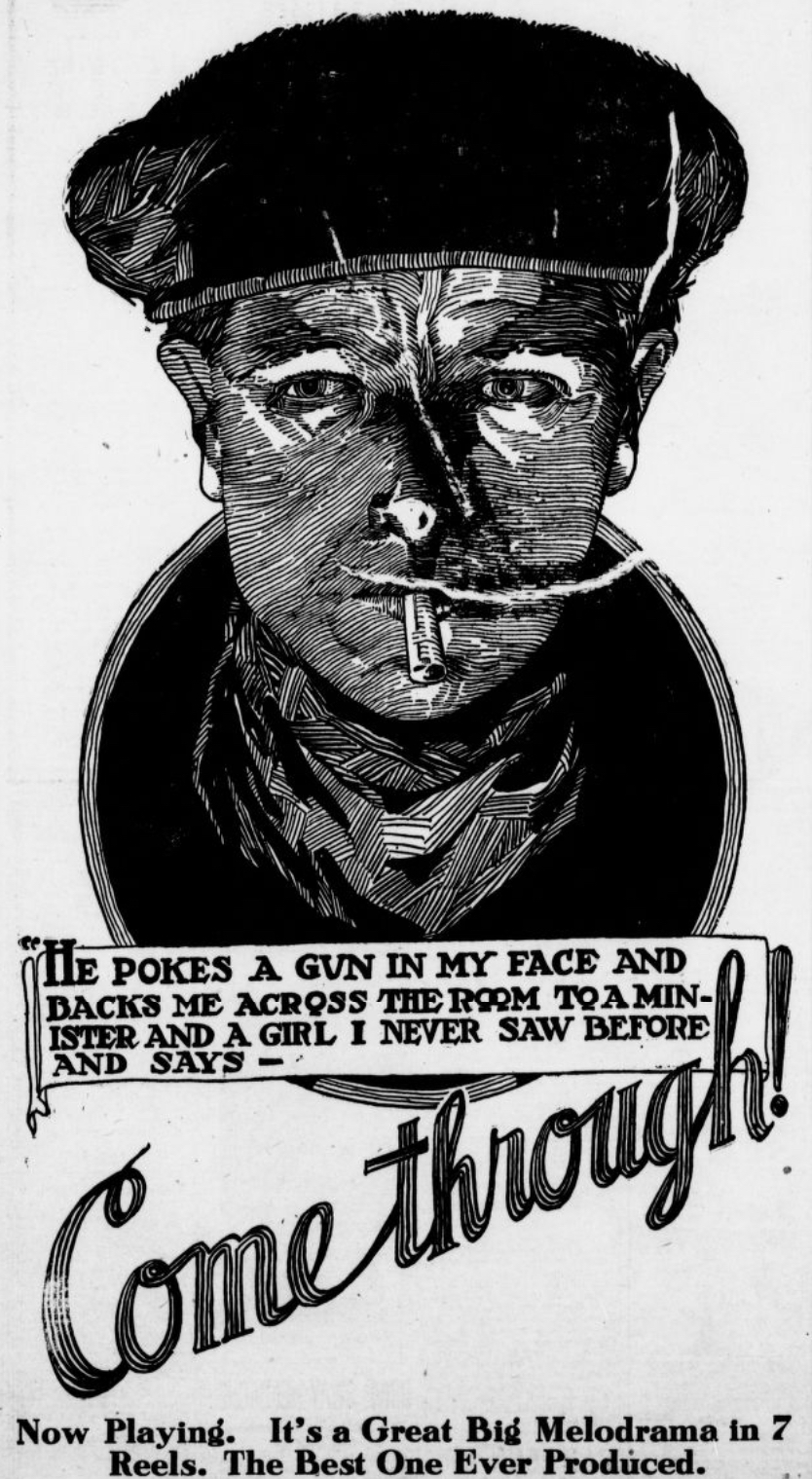
- Advertisement
- Directed by: Jack Conway
- Written by: Fred Myton
- Based on: Come Through by George Bronson Howard
- Starring: Alice Lake; Jean Hathaway; Herbert Rawlinson
- Cinematography: Edward A. Kull
- Production company: Universal Film Manufacturing Company
- Distributed by: Universal Film Manufacturing Company
- Release date: June 17, 1917
- Running time: 70 minutes
- Country: United States
- Language: Silent (English intertitles)

Come Through is a 1917 American silent crime film directed by Jack Conway and starring Alice Lake, Jean Hathaway, and Herbert Rawlinson.

== Cast ==
- Alice Lake, as Velma Gay
- Jean Hathaway, as Mrs. Sylvester Van Deek
- Herbert Rawlinson, as James Harrington Court, aka 'The Possum'
- George Webb, as Archie Craig
- Roy Stewart, as Buck Lindsay
- Charles Hill Mailes, as John Lysaght
- Margaret Whistler, as Mrs. Stoat
- William J. Dyer, as McGinnis
