= Plain Clothes (1925 film) =

1925 short film directed by Harry Edwards

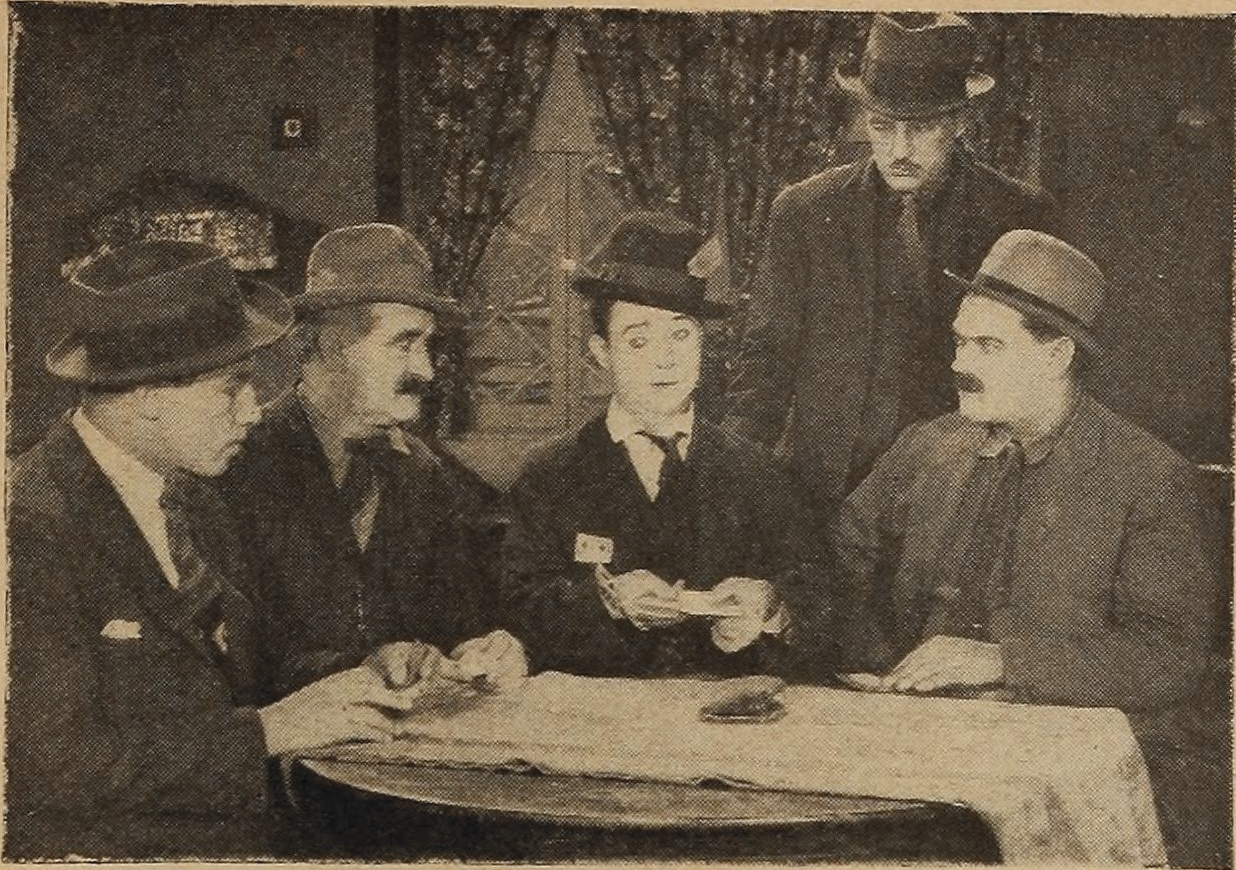
- Harry Langdon in a publicity still
- Directed by: Harry Edwards
- Written by: Frank Capra; Arthur Ripley
- Produced by: Mack Sennett
- Starring: Harry Langdon
- Production company: Mack Sennett Studios
- Distributed by: Pathé Exchange
- Release date: March 29, 1925
- Running time: 20 minutes
- Country: United States
- Language: Silent

Plain Clothes is a 1925 American silent short comedy film starring Harry Langdon and directed by Harry Edwards and produced by Mack Sennett. It was Sennett's first film at least partly written by Frank Capra (with Arthur Ripley).

== Plot ==
A $100,000 jewel robbery has taken place the victim being Mrs Cecile Rhodes (a pun on Cecil Rhodes). The four crooks (aka the "Ferret Gang") have breakfast together in a boarding house. The oldest member passes a diamond necklace to Vernon Dent to be pawned as quickly as possible.

The landlady's daughter Rosie has a knock on her door and a hand passes a rose to her. It is her boyfriend - the very innocent Harvey. She beckons him in and asks him to sit with her on the window-seat. He moves to her chair by chair. She moves onto his lap and he sits awkwardly. Mrs O'Grady her mother goes from the breakfast room into Rosie's room and looks sternly at the pair. Harvey stands and Rosie falls off his lap. The mother sends Rosie away and interrogates Harvey. She asks what he does and he proudly flashes his detective badge. Having duly impressed her he negates the effect by clumsily pulling the curtains off their rail and he promptly leaves.

Back in his office two repo men take his desk away as he arrives. He gets a telephone call from Cecile Rhodes. She offers him $10,000 (10%) if he can recover her jewels. He goes to see Rosie and shows her the promissory note.

Meanwhile at the pawnbrokers shop the pawnbroker not only declines he jewels but also calls the police as son as the crook leaves.

A tall detective walks passed Harvey and Rosie and Harvey walks alongside him to his detective agency "Polky Roman". Harvey shows him his badge just as the police turn up and they all arm themselves with shotguns and jump in an open top car. Harvey gets out a tiny revolver and loads it. he gets the car to stop at Rosie's to tell her that he is on a raid. They get to the pawnbroker and Harvey runs ahead to say there is a raid. The crook slips the diamonds into Harvey's pocket, punches some people and runs off. Harvey stands in the middle of a smoky pistol fight between the crook and the tall detective. He starts throwing bricks at the crook but accidentally its the detective and knocks him out. The crook then chases him to recover the diamonds. The crook thanks him and they go back to the boarding house together.

He gets introduced to the gang and they say with his innocent face he will be able to safely pawn the jewels. Just as he leaves (with the diamonds) Rosie arrives and wants to cuddle Harvey on the couch. She tells the gang that he is a hero and flashes his badge. Harvey looks very worried. The crooks glare at him. He hides the diamonds while they look away.

He adjusts the gas lamp so it is putting out gas. He starts to stagger around. He falls behind the couch and disappears just as the police burst in to arrest the gang. Mrs. O'Grady comes in and starts to scold him. He shows Rosie the diamonds and they both fall over backwards on the couch with their legs in the air.

== Cast ==
- Harry Langdon as Harvey Carter
- Claire Cushman as Rosie O'Grady
- Vernon Dent as the Crook
- Jean Hathaway as Mrs. O'Grady
- William McCal as the Crook's sidekick
- Evelyn Sherman as Cecile Rhodes
- Leo Sulky as the Pawnbroker

== Censorship ==
Before Plain Clothes could be exhibited in Kansas, the Kansas Board of Review required the removal of a scene in reel 1, where Rosie sits on Harvey's lap.
