= Louis Chaudet =

American film director

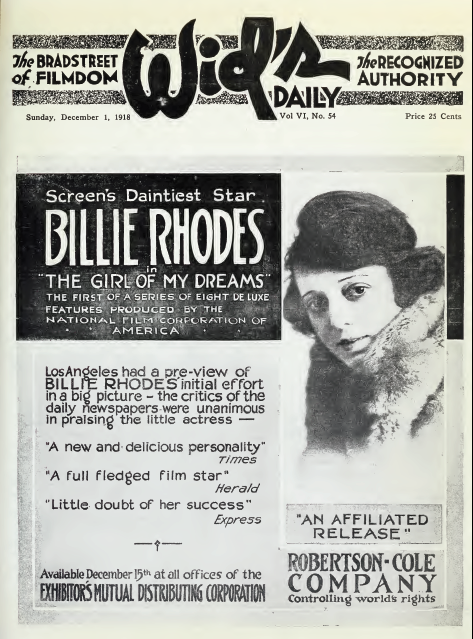
Advertisement for The Girl of my Dreams (1918) with Billie Rhodes, a film directed by Louis William Chaudet.

Louis William Chaudet (March 20, 1884 – May 10, 1965) was an American film director of the silent movie era.

== Biography ==
He was born on March 20, 1884, in Manhattan, Kansas. He died May 10, 1965, in Woodland Hills, California. Louis was the second child and only son of 5 siblings born to Alfred C. Chaudet (1854-1939) and Eva Ann Schlashman Chaudet (1862-1930). Alfred moved his family from Kansas to Pasadena, California between 1900 and 1910 according to the Census of 1910. Along with Louis' first born sister Emma Jane, third and fourth born twin sisters Bertha M. and Lucy Ann and finally sister Edna A.

== Selected filmography ==
- A Young Patriot (1917)
- The Edge of the Law (1917)
- Follow the Girl (1917)
- Society's Driftwood (1917)
- The Finger of Justice (1918)
- Cupid Angling (1918)
- The Girl of My Dreams (1918)
- The Blue Bonnet (1919)

Defying Destiny film

- The Kingfisher's Roost (1921)
- Fools of Fortune (1922)
- Defying Destiny (1923) Viewable online.
- A Man of Nerve (1925)
- Tentacles of the North (1926)
- Eyes Right! (1926)
- Lightning Bill (1926)
- A Captain's Courage (1926)
- Speeding Hoofs (1927)
- Outcast Souls (1928)
