= Grace Sanderson Michie =

American screenwriter

- Born: Grace Marbury Sanderson; August 16, 1893; Marin County, California, USA
- Died: April 7, 1970; San Francisco, California, USA
- Occupation(s): Screenwriter, radio personality
- Spouse: Gordon Michie (div.)

Grace Sanderson Michie (sometimes credited as Grace Marbury Sanderson) was an American screenwriter, film producer, and radio personality active primarily in the 1920s.

== Biography ==
Grace was born in Marin County, California, to William Sanderson and Isabella Riordan. Her father came from a prominent San Francisco family, and her grandfather, George Henry Sanderson, was once the city's mayor. She started off her career writing magazine stories, and appeared in plays as an actress in her younger years.

According to one newspaper account, she was once one of the highest-paid scenario writers of the late 1910s and early 1920s, but she may not have gotten credited on many of the pictures she wrote. In the 1920s, she claimed to be one of the only women film producers in the country. By the end of the decade, however, she had quit the film industry to concentrate on her radio show. Her marriage to banker Gordon Michie ended in divorce.

== Selected filmography ==
- Pagan Passions (1924)
- Defying Destiny (1923)
- The Waif (unknown)
- More Deadly Than Battle (1917)
- The Finger of Justice (1917)
- Broken Wings (unknown)
- Mauve Orchid (unknown)
