= Lon Chaney filmography =

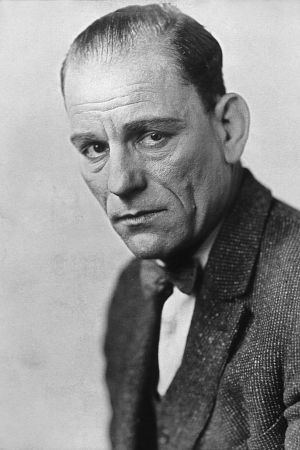
Lon Chaney in 1923

Lon Chaney (April 1, 1883 – August 26, 1930) was an American actor during the age of silent films. He is regarded as one of cinema's most versatile and powerful actors, renowned for his characterizations of tortured, sometimes grotesque and afflicted characters, and his groundbreaking artistry with makeup. Chaney is known for his starring roles in such silent horror films as The Hunchback of Notre Dame (1923) and The Phantom of the Opera (1925). His ability to transform himself using makeup techniques that he developed earned him the nickname "The Man of a Thousand Faces."

== Cast in films ==
Title	Role	Release date	Production and/or distribution companies	Notes
Poor Jake's Demise	Willy (The Dude) Mollycoddle	August 16, 1913	IMP - Universal	Incomplete film
The Sea Urchin	Barnacle Bill	August 22, 1913	Powers - Universal	Lost film
The Blood Red Tape of Charity	Jewish pawnbroker	September 26, 1913	Powers - Universal	
Shon the Piper	Scottish clansman	September 30, 1913	101-Bison - Universal	
The Trap		October 3, 1913 (Note: The film was released on October 26, 1913 according to the Universal Code Book. This would seem to be in error.)	Powers - Universal	
The Restless Spirit	dual role as a Russian count and a wild man	October 27, 1913	Victor - Universal	
An Elephant on His Hands	Eddie	November 21, 1913	Nestor - Universal	
Almost an Actress	The Cameraman	November 15, 1913	Joker - Universal	
Back to Life	The Rival	November 24, 1913	Victor - Universal	
Red Margaret, Moonshiner	Lon	December 9, 1913	Gold Seal - Universal	
Bloodhounds of the North	Mountie	December 23, 1913	Gold Seal - Universal	
The Lie	Young MacGregor	January 6, 1914	Gold Seal - Universal	
The Honor of the Mounted	Jacques Laquox	February 17, 1914	Gold Seal - Universal	
Remember Mary Magdalen	The Half-wit	February 23, 1914	Victor - Universal	
Discord and Harmony	The Sculptor	March 17, 1914	Gold Seal - Universal	
The Menace to Carlotta	Giovanni Bartholi	March 22, 1914	Rex - Universal	
The Embezzler	J. Roger Dixon	March 31, 1914	Gold Seal - Universal	
The Lamb, the Woman, the Wolf	The Wolf	April 4, 1914	101-Bison - Universal	
The End of the Feud	Wood Dawson	April 12, 1914	Rex - Universal	
The Tragedy of Whispering Creek	The Greaser	May 2, 1914	101-Bison - Universal	
The Unlawful Trade	The Half-Breed	May 14, 1914	Rex - Universal	
The Forbidden Room	John Morris	June 20, 1914	101-Bison - Universal	
The Old Cobbler	Wild Bill	June 27, 1914	101-Bison - Universal	
The Hopes of Blind Alley	Vendor	July 4, 1914	101-Bison - Universal	
A Ranch Romance	Raphael Praz	July 8, 1914	Nestor - Universal	
Her Grave Mistake	Nunez	July 15, 1914	Nestor - Universal	
By the Sun's Rays	Frank Lawler	July 22, 1914	Nestor - Universal	
The Oubliette	Chevalier Bertrand De La Payne	August 15, 1914	101-Bison - Universal	
A Miner's Romance	John Burns	August 26, 1914	Nestor - Universal	
Her Bounty	Fred Howard	September 13, 1914	Rex - Universal	
The Higher Law	Sir Stephen	September 19, 1914	101-Bison - Universal	
Richelieu	Baradas	September 26, 1914	101-Bison - Universal	
The Pipes o' Pan	Arthur Farrell	October 4, 1914	Rex - Universal	
Virtue Is Its Own Reward	Duncan Bronson	October 11, 1914	Rex - Universal	
Her Life's Story	Don Valasquez	October 15, 1914	Rex - Universal	
A Small Town Girl	Procurer	November 7, 1914	101-Bison - Universal	
Lights and Shadows	Bentley	November 29, 1914	Rex - Universal	
The Lion, the Lamb, the Man	Fred	December 6, 1914	Rex - Universal	
A Night of Thrills		December 13, 1914	Rex - Universal	
Her Escape	Pete	December 13, 1914	Rex - Universal	
The Sin of Olga Brandt	Stephen Leslie	January 3, 1915	Rex - Universal	
The Star of the Sea	Tomasco	January 10, 1915	Rex - Universal	
The Measure of a Man	Mountie Lt. Jim Stuart	January 28, 1915	Rex - Universal	
The Threads of Fate	The Count	February 21, 1915	Rex - Universal	
When the Gods Played a Badger Game	The Property Man	February 28, 1915	Rex - Universal	
Such Is Life	Tod Wilkes	March 4, 1915	Rex - Universal	
Where the Forest Ends	Paul Rouchelle	March 7, 1915	Rex - Universal	
Outside the Gates	Perez	March 14, 1915	Rex - Universal	
All for Peggy	The Stable Groom	March 18, 1915	Rex - Universal	
The Desert Breed	Fred	March 28, 1915	Rex - Universal	
Maid of the Mist	The Postmaster	April 1, 1915	Rex - Universal	
The Girl of the Night		April 8, 1915	Rex - Universal	
The Stool Pigeon	Directed -	April 9, 1915	Victor - Universal	
The Grind				
An Idyll of the Hills				
The Stronger Mind				
The Oyster Dredger				
Steady Company				
The Violin Maker				
The Trust				
Bound on the Wheel				
Mountain Justice				
Quits				
The Chimney's Secret				
The Pine's Revenge				
The Fascination of the Fleur de Lis				
Alas and Alack				
A Mother's Atonement				
Lon of Lone Mountain				
The Millionaire Paupers				
Under a Shadow				
Stronger Than Death				
Father and the Boys				
Dolly's Scoop				
The Grip of Jealousy				
Tangled Hearts				
The Gilded Spider				
Bobbie of the Ballet				
The Grasp of Greed				
The Mark of Cain				
If My Country Should Call				
Felix on the Job				
The Place Beyond the Winds				
Accusing Evidence				
The Price of Silence				
The Piper's Price				
Hell Morgan's Girl				
The Mask of Love				
The Girl in the Checkered Coat				
The Flashlight				
A Doll's House				
Fires of Rebellion				
The Rescue				
Triumph				
Pay Me!	Joe Lawson	September 1, 1917		
The Empty Gun				
Anything Once				
The Scarlet Car				
Broadway Love				
The Grand Passion				
The Kaiser, the Beast of Berlin				
Fast Company				
A Broadway Scandal				
Riddle Gawne				
That Devil, Bateese				
The Talk of the Town				
Danger, Go Slow				
The Wicked Darling				
Daredevil Jack				
The False Faces	Karl Eckstrom	February 16, 1919	Thomas Ince - Paramount	
A Man's Country			Winsome Stars Corporation - Robertson Cole	
Paid in Advance	Bateese Le Blanc	November 30, 1919	Universal	
The Miracle Man	The Frog	August 29, 1919	George Loane Tucker - Paramount	
When Bearcat Went Dry				
Victory			Maurice Tourneur - Paramount	
Treasure Island			Maurice Tourneur - Paramount	
The Gift Supreme				
Nomads of the North	Raoul Challoner	October 11, 1920	Associated First National	
The Penalty	Blizzard	July 20, 1920	Rex Beach and Sam Goldwyn - Goldwyn Pictures	
Outside the Law	Black Mike Sylva/Ah Wing	December 26, 1920	Tod Browning - Universal	
Bits of Life			Marshall Neilan - Associated First National	
The Ace of Hearts			Wallace Worsley - Goldwyn Pictures	
For Those We Love			Betty Compson - Goldwyn Pictures	
The Trap	Gaspard the Good	May 9, 1922	Universal	
Voices of the City			Goldwyn Pictures	
Flesh and Blood				
The Light in the Dark	Tony Pantelli	September 3, 1922	Associated First National	
Shadows			B. P. Schulberg - Preferred Pictures	
Oliver Twist	Fagin	October 30, 1922	Sol Lesser - Associated First National	
Quincy Adams Sawyer			Metro Pictures	
A Blind Bargain			Goldwyn Pictures	
All the Brothers Were Valiant			Metro Pictures	
While Paris Sleeps				
The Shock	Wilse Dilling	July 10, 1923	Universal	
The Hunchback of Notre Dame	Quasimodo	September 2, 1923	Universal	
The Next Corner			Famous Players–Lasky, Paramount	
He Who Gets Slapped	Paul Beaumont	November 9, 1924	MGM	
The Monster	Dr. Ziska	March 16, 1925	MGM	
The Unholy Three	Prof. Echo/Mrs. O'Grady	August 16, 1925	MGM	
The Phantom of the Opera	The Phantom of the Opera/Erik	November 25, 1925	Universal	
The Tower of Lies			MGM	
The Blackbird	Dan 'The Blackbird'/The Bishop	January 11, 1926	MGM	
The Road to Mandalay			MGM	
Tell It to the Marines	Sergeant O'Hara	December 23, 1926	MGM	
Mr. Wu			MGM	
The Unknown	Alonzo the Armless	June 4, 1927	MGM	
Mockery	Sergei		MGM	
London After Midnight	Inspector Edward C. Burke	December 3, 1927	MGM	Lost film
The Big City			MGM	
Laugh, Clown, Laugh	Tito	April 14, 1928	MGM	
While the City Sleeps			MGM	
West of Zanzibar	Phroso	November 24, 1928	MGM	
Where East Is East			MGM	
Thunder			MGM	
The Unholy Three	Prof. Echo/Mrs. O'Grady	July 12, 1930	MGM	

== Directed films ==
Title	Release date	Production company	Notes
The Stool Pigeon	April 9, 1915	Universal	Cast and directed
For Cash	May 3, 1915	Universal	Only directed
The Oyster Dredger	June 14, 1915	Universal	Cast and directed
The Violin Maker	July 9, 1915	Universal	Directed and acted
The Trust	July 16, 1915	Universal	Directed and acted
The Chimney's Secret	August 25, 1915	Universal	Directed, wrote and acted
The Phantom of the Opera	November 25, 1925	Universal	Uncredited
