= The Stool Pigeon (1915 film) =

- Directed by: Lon Chaney
- Written by: Harry G. Stafford
- Produced by: Victor Film Co.
- Starring: J. Warren Kerrigan; Vera Sisson
- Distributed by: Universal Pictures
- Release date: April 19, 1915
- Running time: 2 reels (20 minutes)
- Country: United States
- Languages: Silent; English intertitles

The Stool Pigeon is a 1915 American crime film directed by Lon Chaney and starring J. Warren Kerrigan, Vera Sisson and George Periolat. Chaney did not appear in the film himself. The film is considered to be lost.

The Stool Pigeon was Chaney's debut as a movie director. Chaney directed a total of six silent films for the Victor Company, all released in 1915. (The other five were For Cash, The Oyster Dredger, The Violin Maker, The Trust and The Chimney's Secret. Sadly none of the six films exist today.)

This film should not be confused with The Stool Pigeon (also 1915) which was directed by Paul Powell.

== Plot ==
Walter Jason, a young man from the country, comes to the big city to find a job but fails to do so. Oswald Trumble is well known in high society but in reality is the leader of a criminal gang. Trumble spots Jason down at the river's edge appearing depressed and prevents the young man from committing suicide. He buys Jason food and some new clothes and sets him up in a nice apartment, in order to win Jason's friendship. Trumble introduces Jason into high society where he meets Mildred Moore, the beautiful daughter of the wealthy Mrs. Crosby Moore. Trumble has been planning to steal the rich old lady's jewels.

Jason is attracted to Mildred, but meanwhile Trumble comes up with a daring plan for the heist. His plan is to abduct Mildred and replace her with a lookalike; Jason will unknowingly lead the fake Mildred back into her house, where the lookalike will grab the old lady's jewels. The plot goes as planned, except that Jason notices that the woman he is with is suddenly missing a beauty mark she had earlier in the evening. He tips off the cops and they capture the impostor.

The police give the girl the third degree, and she confesses the entire plot. A trap is set and Trumble's whole gang is rounded up. Jason forces Trumble to reveal where the real Mildred is being held, then rescues the girl. Jason confesses his past criminal activities to Mildred and her mother, and they forgive him. His engagement to Mildred is soon announced.

== Cast ==
- J. Warren Kerrigan - Walter Jason
- Vera Sisson - Mildred Moore
- George Periolat - Oswald Trumble

== Reception ==
"A crook story of unusual interest in two reels...The story is cleverly worked out and holds the interest firmly."—Moving Picture World

"This is Lon Chaney's first picture made with the Kerrigan-Victor company, and his success with it marks him as a capable director. The story is replete with situations of a tense character, and is so constructed that the climax can hardly be foretold until it arrives, a great point in its credit. That it will be heartily appreciated by the most critical audience is certain." ---Motion Picture News
