= Stool Pigeon (disambiguation) =

A stool pigeon is an informant.

Stool Pigeon or The Stool Pigeon may refer to:

- The Stool Pigeon (1915 film), a lost American film
- Stool Pigeon (1928 film), an American silent film
- The Stool Pigeon (2010 film), a Hong Kong-Chinese film
- The Stool Pigeon (newspaper), an independent UK music newspaper
- "Stool Pigeon" (song), by Kid Creole and the Coconuts (1982)
