= The Threads of Fate =

1915 film

- Directed by: Joe De Grasse
- Written by: Tom Forman
- Starring: Pauline Bush; William C. Dowlan; Lon Chaney
- Distributed by: Universal Pictures
- Release date: February 21, 1915
- Running time: 2 reels (20 minutes)
- Country: United States
- Language: Silent with English intertitles

The Threads of Fate (aka Threads of Fate) is a 1915 American silent drama film directed by Joe De Grasse, written by Tom Forman, and featuring Pauline Bush, William C. Dowlan and Lon Chaney. The film is now considered to be a lost film. A still exists showing Lon Chaney made up as "The Count" trying to persuade the heroine of the film to marry him.

The film's subtitles were all extractions from the literary works of famous authors, such as Tennyson, Milton and Pope. The film is framed by both a beginning and an ending sequence showing the three Fates weaving the threads of Mankind, these sequences being hand-colored (the rest of the film was in black-and-white).

== Plot ==
The story follows the lives of two children: a wealthy boy and a poor girl. The rich boy grows up to be a musician, while the girl develops into a charming young woman. The man tires of society life, and travels the countryside disguised as a street musician. The woman goes to the city and is adopted by a wealthy aunt, who introduces her to the Count (Lon Chaney), whom the aunt has arranged to marry the girl. One night, she leaves the house dressed as a simple country maid, and she is attracted to the beautiful melody of a violin. She follows the music and meets the man who is playing it, and a warm friendship soon develops. The two meet regularly, and neither one reveals their true identity to the other. The woman feels her love for the musician is hopeless, since he is beneath her class, and she reluctantly consents to marry the Count. The violin player (who is in reality of noble birth) is distraught when the girl stops visiting him, and he returns to his dissipated high society life. Some time later, the woman, now trapped in a loveless marriage to the Count, hears the familiar sound of the violin. She finds the man, and this time their true identities are revealed. Realizing they are both people of wealth, the two plan to run away together, but the Count discovers their plans and pursues them. Rather than be separated, the two young lovers drive their car off a cliff to their deaths.

== Cast ==
- Pauline Bush as The Wife
- William C. Dowlan as The Lover
- Lon Chaney as The Count

== Reception ==
"A two-reel number, with Pauline Bush, Wm. Dowlin and Lon Chancy in the cast. The story concerns a poor girl and a young man of artistic leanings who tire of the social life into which they are thrown....The subtitles are quotations from famous writers. The production, as a whole, is too impressionistic and vague in certain respects; it would have held the attention more strongly with a more definite plot. It makes a fair offering as it stands."—Moving Picture World

"A psychological drama of the unconventional nature made by Joseph De Grasse....The subtitles are extractions from Pope, Horace, Whittier, Steadman, Taylor, Tennyson, Dryden and Milton."—Motion Picture News

== See also ==
- Lon Chaney filmography
- List of lost films
