= Millard K. Wilson =

American actor (1890–1933)

Millard Kent Wilson
- Born: May 5, 1890; Louisville, Kentucky, US
- Died: October 5, 1933 (aged 43); Long Beach, California, US
- Occupation: Actor
- Years active: 1914-1930

Millard K. Wilson (May 5, 1890 – October 5, 1933) was an American actor of the silent film era. He appeared in 94 films between 1914 and 1930, co-starring with Lon Chaney Sr. in some of them. Chaney and Wilson were life-long friends. Wilson died in Long Beach, California in 1933 in a road accident.

== Partial filmography ==
- The Lion, the Lamb, the Man (1914)
- The Higher Law (1914)
- Stronger Than Death (1915)
- Under a Shadow (1915)
- The Millionaire Paupers (1915)
- A Mother's Atonement (1915)
- The Fascination of the Fleur de Lis (1915)
- The Pine's Revenge (1915)
- An Idyll of the Hills (1915)
- Dolly's Scoop (1916)
- The Flower of Doom (1917)
- The Pulse of Life (1917)
- Fighting Mad (1917)
- The Field of Honor (1917)
- A Woman's Fool (1918)
- The Branded Man (1918)
- Hell Bent (1918)
- Play Straight or Fight (1918)
- Smashing Through (1918)
- The Scarlet Drop (1918)
- Thieves' Gold (1918)
- Riders of Vengeance (1919)
- In the Days of Buffalo Bill (1922)
- The Costello Case (1930)
