= The Star of the Sea =

1915 film

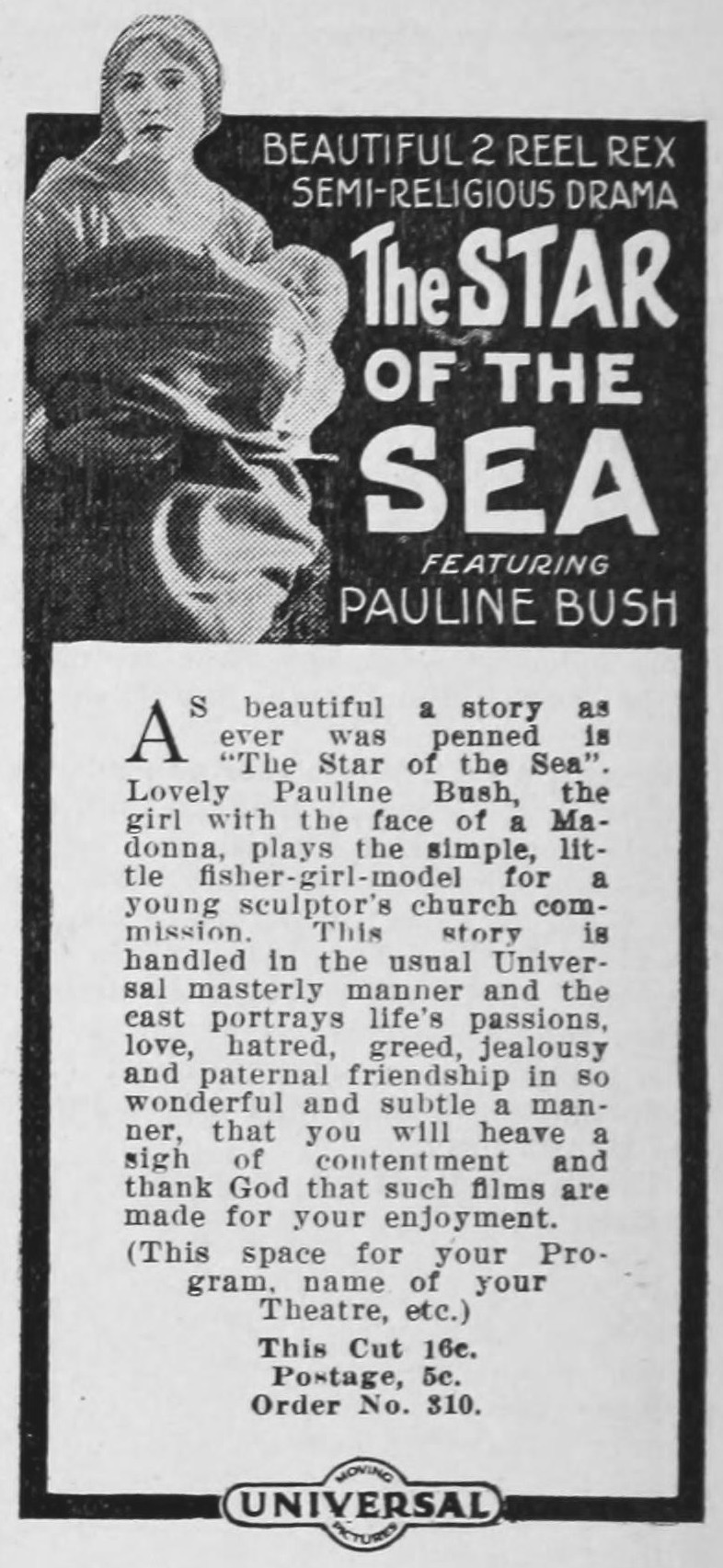
- Pre-release advertisement for the film, December 1914
- Directed by: Joe De Grasse
- Written by: Phil K. Walsh
- Starring: Lon Chaney; Pauline Bush
- Distributed by: Universal Pictures
- Release date: January 10, 1915
- Running time: 2 reels
- Country: United States
- Language: Silent with English intertitles

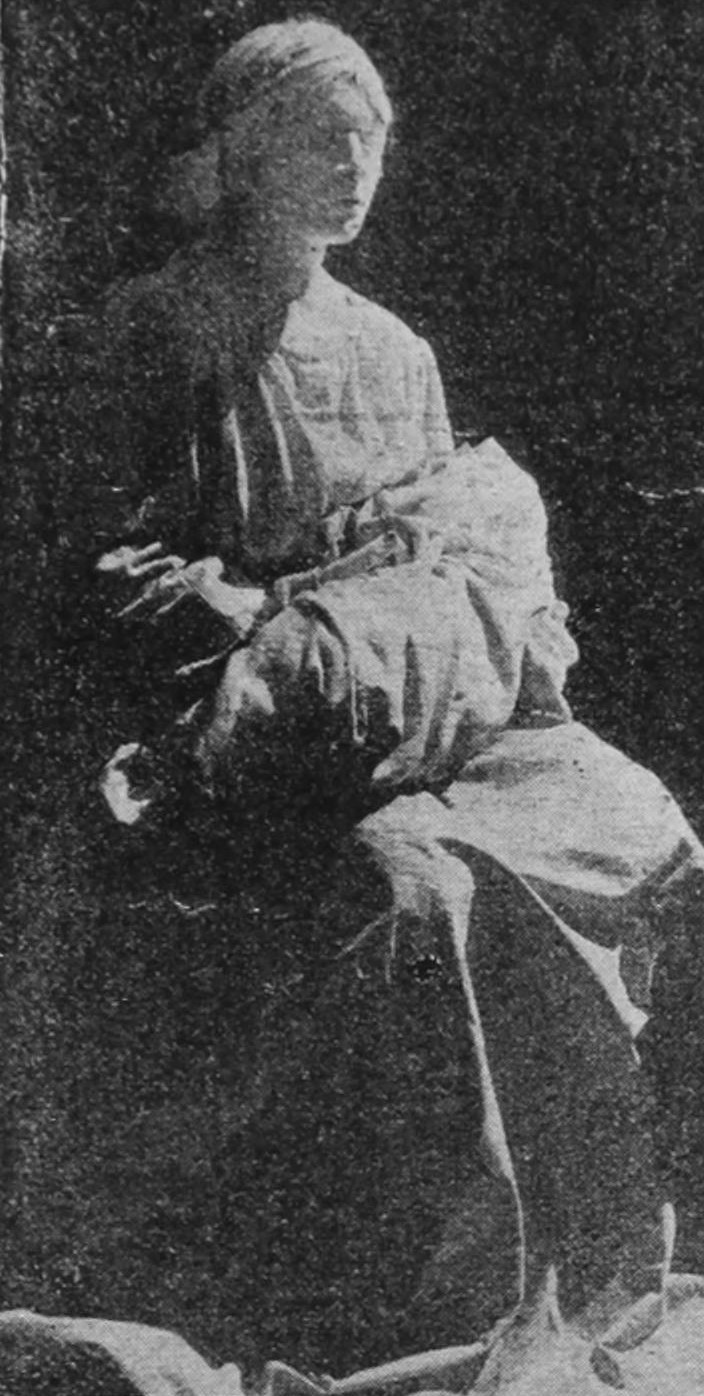
Pauline Bush as the statue in the film

The Star of the Sea is a 1915 American silent drama film directed by Joe De Grasse, written by Phil K. Walsh, and starring Lon Chaney and Pauline Bush. The film is now considered to be lost. A still exists showing Lon Chaney in the role of Tomasco, the hunchbacked fisherman.

== Plot ==
Mario Busoni is a young sculptor, whose uncle is Father Busoni, pastor of the Church of the Holy Name at Fiesole. Mario is hired to sculpt a life-sized statue of the Madonna for his uncle's church, and he is sent to Naples to do the work. There he meets Janice, a young model who invites him to live with her, but his uncle arrives and thwarts her plans. She tries to ensnare the young boy again later, but the uncle intervenes once more. Meanwhile, Mario tells his uncle that he must have a live model to work from; he hires Mary, a young widow who is raising a baby boy on her own, and he uses them both to model for his statue of the Virgin and Child.

Tomasco, a hunchbacked fisherman, is in love with Mary, and when she rejects his proposal of marriage, he suspects Mario of being his rival. Janice learns that Mario is planning to marry Mary, which foils both Tomasco's, and her own, happiness. Upon hearing that Mario has finished his statue, Tomasco and Janice both plot together to sneak into the church at night and destroy the statue out of revenge.

They arrive at the church with a sledge hammer where they see the finished work. But Tomasco is incapable of destroying the beautiful statue. Janice laughs at his sentiment and picks up the hammer, but just as she is about to destroy the statue, the eyes of the Madonna open, and the two transgressors fall to their knees at the statue's feet and pray for forgiveness. The story ends near Mary's seaside home, with Mario and Mary in a loving embrace, and Father Busoni holding aloft her baby who claps his hands joyfully at the sight of the surf.

== Cast ==
- William C. Dowlan as Mario Brisoni
- Pauline Bush as Mary, The Fisher Girl
- Lon Chaney as Tomasco, The Hunchback
- Laura Oakley as Janice, The Model
- Marc Robbins as Father Busoni

== Reception ==
"...This drama presents a fine story and excellently produced by Joseph De Grasse. Some very pretty scenes have been caught. The action is slow yet always absorbing."—Motion Picture News

"A strong, artistic offering with a decided pull in it. The opening scenes in the sculptor's studio catch the interest at once and throughout the picture the director, Joseph De Grasse, has shown a strong instinct for artistic effects. Laura Oakley is particularly good as the model...This gives Miss Bush one of the most effective roles she has had for some time, and the happy child added immensely to the scenes. This offering is sure to have wide appeal."—Moving Picture World

== See also ==
- Lon Chaney filmography
- List of lost films
