= The Pine's Revenge =

1915 film

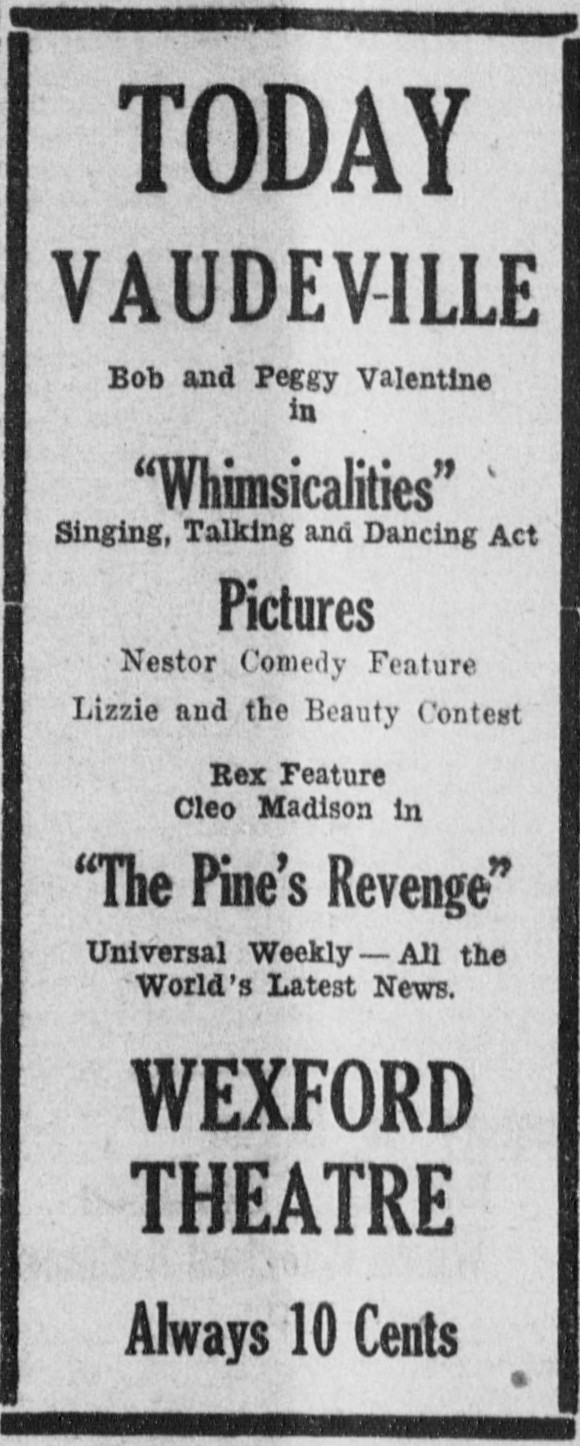
- A newspaper advertisement for several films, including The Pine's Revenge
- Directed by: Joe De Grasse
- Written by: Nell Shipman
- Produced by: Rex Film Co.
- Starring: Lon Chaney; Cleo Madison
- Distributed by: Universal Pictures
- Release date: September 19, 1915
- Running time: 2 reels (20 minutes)
- Country: United States
- Language: Silent with English intertitles

The Pine's Revenge is a 1915 American silent drama film of the Northhwoods, directed by Joe De Grasse, written by Nell Shipman, and featuring Lon Chaney and Arthur Shirley. Shipman based her screenplay on her own story, "The King's Keeper". The film is now considered to be lost.

For some reason, film historian Michael F. Blake stated that director De Grasse's wife Ida May Park wrote the screenplay, but the contemporary review of the film in Motion Picture News stated it was written by Nell Shipman.

== Plot ==
Dick Rance, a forest ranger, arrests Black Scotty for willfully burning an area of the forest and for hunting without a license, and Scotty swears vengeance on the ranger. That same afternoon, Rance rescues a girl whose canoe was overturned by her date, and discovers that she is Grace Milton, a former fiancé of his, who he left when he found her in an amorous embrace with his rival John Harding. Harding, in fact, was the one who tipped over the canoe, and he follows Grace when she goes to Rance's cabin in the woods to thank him for rescuing her, still not realizing that the ranger is her old flame.

Rance is very cold toward Grace when she asks his forgiveness, but Harding still worries that eventually Rance will soften and steal her away. Harding asks Grace to marry him, but she rebuffs his advances, seemingly now interested in reviving her old relationship with Rance. Harding meets with Black Scotty, and the two plot revenge together against their mutual enemy, planning to trap the ranger in a forest fire. Grace writes a letter to Rance, asking him to meet her at Pine Cove, but she pridefully changes her mind about mailing him the note. Harding manages to obtain the letter after she discards it and sends it on to Rance, while he and Black Scotty prepare a trap for the ranger.

Rance is captured and imprisoned by Harding, while Scotty sets fire to the "King Pine", the oldest and grandest tree in the forest. Rance escapes from Harding and races to the scene of the fire just in time to call for help. The burning tree topples onto Black Scotty and kills him. Rance is rewarded for his bravery, and is reunited with Grace. Harding is arrested and confesses his crime.

== Cast ==
- Arthur Shirley as Dick Rance, Forest Ranger
- Cleo Madison as Grace Milton, Dick's Old Flame
- Millard K. Wilson as John Harding, Dick's Rival
- Lon Chaney as Scotty "Black Scotty"

== Reception ==
"The scenes taken in the pine forest are very attractive and the story worked out in an entertaining manner." --- Moving Picture World.

"This is an average story.... Its northern scenes and photography are most satisfying." --- Motion Picture News

== See also ==
- List of lost films
- Lon Chaney filmography
