= Lon Chaney =

American actor (1883–1930)

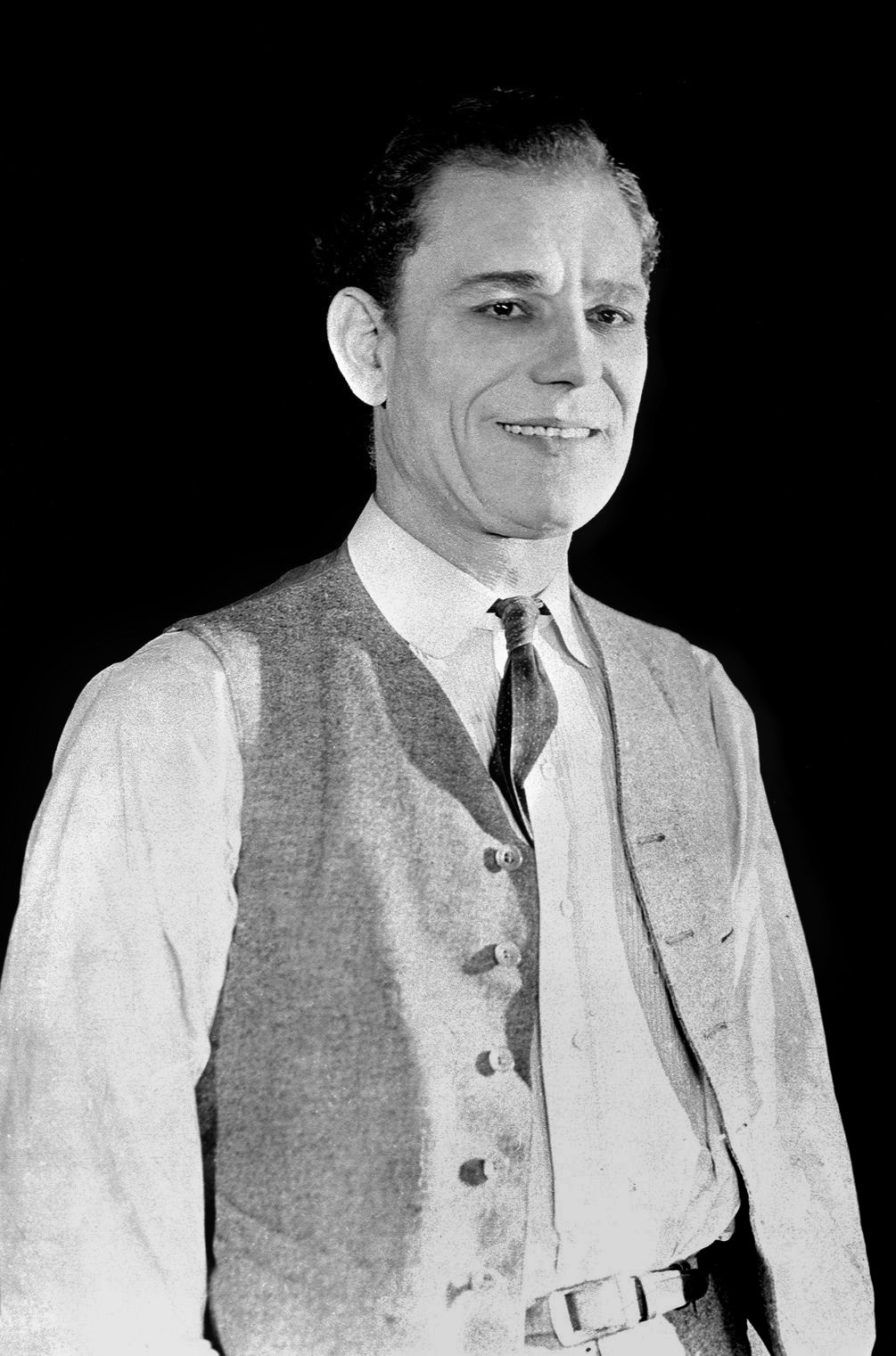
- Chaney during the production of The Miracle Man (1919)
- Born: Leonidas Frank Chaney; April 1, 1883; Colorado Springs, Colorado, U.S.
- Died: August 26, 1930 (aged 47); Los Angeles, California, U.S.
- Resting place: Forest Lawn Memorial Park (Glendale)
- Other name: The Man of a Thousand Faces
- Occupations: Actor; director; screenwriter; makeup artist
- Years active: 1902–1930
- Spouses: Frances Cleveland ("Cleva") Creighton (m. 1905; div. 1913) Hazel Bennett Hastings (m. 1915)
- Children: Lon Chaney Jr. (born Creighton Tull Chaney)
- Website: lonchaney.com

Leonidas Frank "Lon" Chaney (April 1, 1883 – August 26, 1930) was an American silent film actor and makeup artist. He is regarded as one of the most versatile and powerful actors of cinema, renowned for his characterizations of tortured, often grotesque and afflicted, characters and for his groundbreaking artistry with makeup. Chaney was known for his starring roles in such silent horror films as The Hunchback of Notre Dame (1923) and The Phantom of the Opera (1925). His ability to transform himself using makeup techniques that he developed earned him the nickname "The Man of a Thousand Faces".

== Early life ==
Chaney was born in Colorado Springs, Colorado, to Frank H. Chaney (a barber) and Emma Alice Kennedy. His father was of English and French ancestry, and his mother was of Scottish, English, and Irish descent.

Both of Chaney's parents were deaf. They met at the Colorado School for the Education of Mutes (now Colorado School for the Deaf and Blind) in 1874, founded by Chaney's maternal grandfather, Jonathan Ralston Kennedy. His great-grandfather was congressman John Chaney from Ohio.

As a child of deaf adults, Chaney became skilled in American Sign Language. He entered a stage career in 1902, when he was 19, and began traveling with popular vaudeville and theater acts.

In 1905, Chaney, then 22, met and married 16-year-old singer Cleva Creighton (Frances Cleveland Creighton). In 1906, their only child, son Creighton Tull Chaney (later known as Lon Chaney Jr.), was born. The Chaneys continued touring until they settled in California in 1910.

Marital troubles developed. On April 30, 1913, Cleva went to the Majestic Theatre, where Lon was managing the vaudeville team "Kolb and Dill", and attempted suicide. She survived swallowing mercuric chloride, but it ruined her singing career. The ensuing scandal and divorce later that year forced Chaney out of the theater and into film.

Not much is known about Chaney's life between 1912 and 1917, but Chaney worked under contract for Universal Studios doing bit or character parts. His skill with makeup gained him many parts in the highly competitive casting atmosphere. During this time, Chaney befriended the husband-wife director team of Joe De Grasse and Ida May Park, who gave him substantial roles in their pictures and further encouraged him to play macabre characters.

In 1915, the 32-year-old Chaney married one of his former colleagues in the Kolb and Dill company, a chorus girl named Hazel Hastings. She was recently divorced from Charles S. Hastings, a double leg amputee that ran a San Francisco cigar counter. The new couple gained custody of Chaney's 10-year-old son Creighton, who had resided in various homes and boarding schools since Chaney's divorce from Cleva.

== Career ==
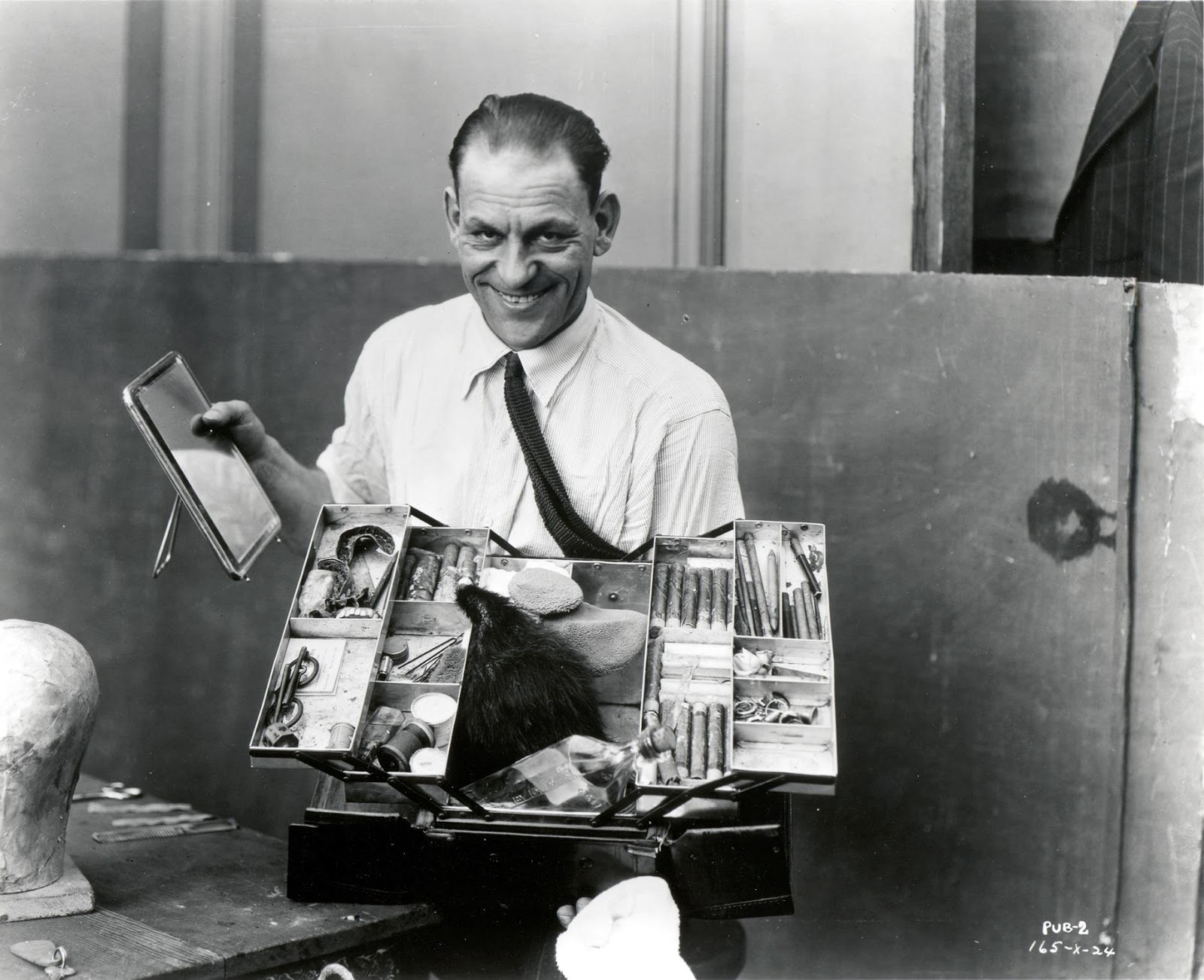
Chaney with his personal makeup kit in 1925

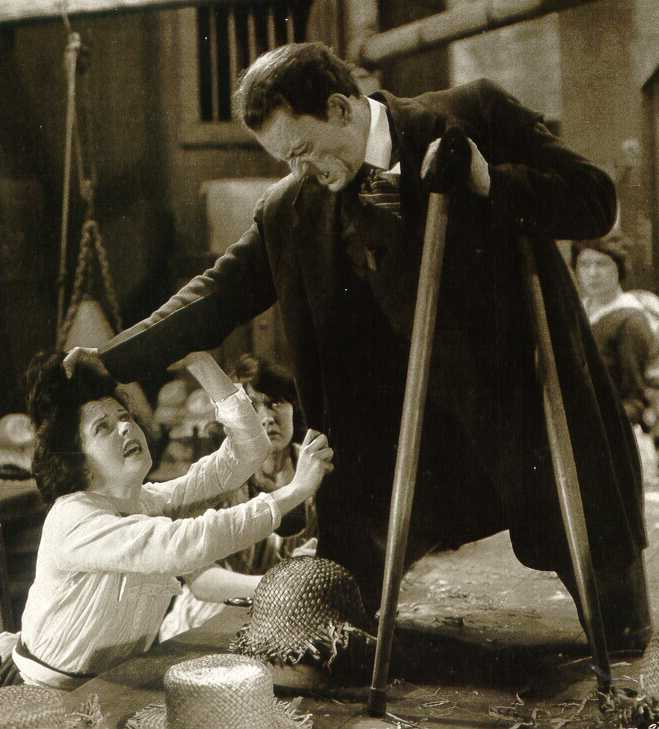
Ethel Grey Terry and Chaney in The Penalty (1920)

By 1917, Chaney was a prominent actor in the studio, but his salary did not reflect this status. When Chaney asked for a raise, studio executive William Sistrom replied, "You'll never be worth more than one hundred dollars a week." After leaving the studio, Chaney struggled for the first year as a character actor. It was not until he played a substantial role in William S. Hart's picture Riddle Gawne (1918) that Chaney's talents as a character actor were truly recognized by the industry.

Universal presented Chaney, Dorothy Phillips, and William Stowell as a team in The Piper's Price (1917). In succeeding films, the men alternated playing lover, villain, or other man to the beautiful Phillips. They would occasionally be joined by Claire DuBrey, nearly making the trio a quartet of recurring actors from film to film. So successful were the films starring this group that Universal produced fourteen films from 1917 to 1919 with Chaney, Stowell, and Phillips.

The films were usually directed by Joe De Grasse or his wife Ida May Park - both friends of Chaney - at Universal. When Chaney was away branching out on films such as Riddle Gawne and The Kaiser, the Beast of Berlin (both 1918), Stowell and Phillips would continue on as a duo until Chaney's return. Stowell and Phillips made The Heart of Humanity (also 1918), bringing in Erich von Stroheim for a part as the villain that could easily have been played by Chaney.

Paid in Advance (1919) was the group's last film together, for Stowell was sent to Africa by Universal to scout locations for a movie. En route from one city to another, Stowell was in the caboose when it was hit by the locomotive from another train; he was killed instantly. The majority of the films made by the trio are lost apart from a few, including Triumph and Paid in Advance, which survive in private collections or in European or Russian archives. (Note: In a scene from Triumph (1917), biographer Daniel Blum described the scene as: "... Phillips has hand on Chaney's head embracing him while Stowell reads paperwork on desk.")

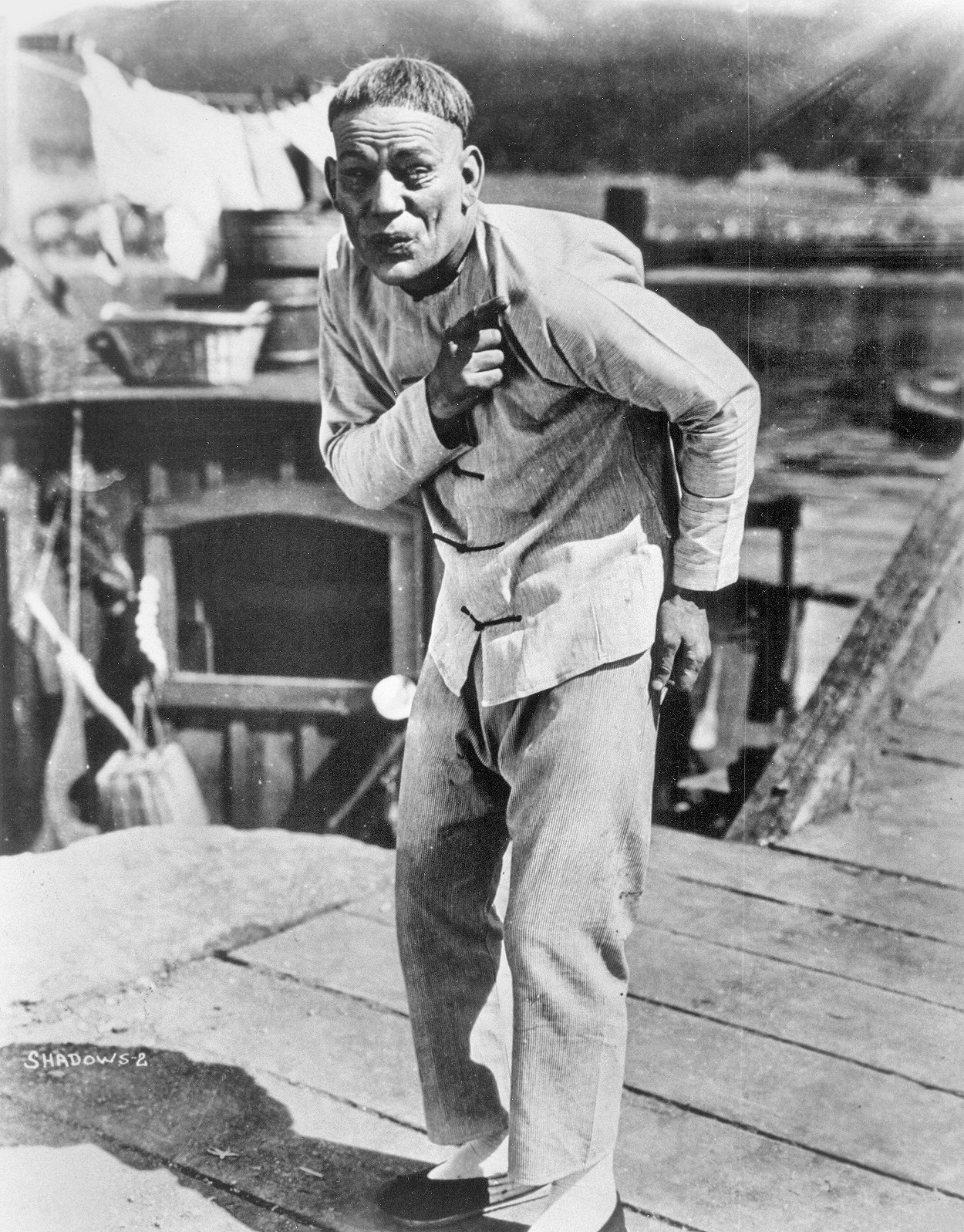
Chaney as the Chinese immigrant "Yen Sin" in Shadows (1922)

Chaney had a breakthrough performance as "The Frog" in George Loane Tucker's The Miracle Man (1919). The film displayed not only Chaney's acting ability, but also his talent as a master of makeup. Critical praise and a gross of over $2 million put Chaney on the map as America's foremost character actor.

Chaney exhibited great adaptability with makeup in more conventional crime and adventure films, such as The Penalty (1920), in which he played a gangster with both legs amputated. Chaney appeared in ten films directed by Tod Browning, often portraying disguised and/or mutilated characters, including carnival knife-thrower Alonzo the Armless in The Unknown (1927) opposite Joan Crawford. Around the same time, Chaney also co-starred with Conrad Nagel, Marceline Day, Henry B. Walthall, and Polly Moran in the Tod Browning horror film London After Midnight (1927), one of the most sought after lost films. His final film role was The Unholy Three (1930), a sound remake of his 1925 silent film of the same name. The 1930 remake was his only "talkie" and the only film in which Chaney used his powerful and versatile voice. Chaney signed a sworn statement declaring that five of the key voices in the film (the ventriloquist, the old woman, a parrot, the dummy and the girl) were his own.

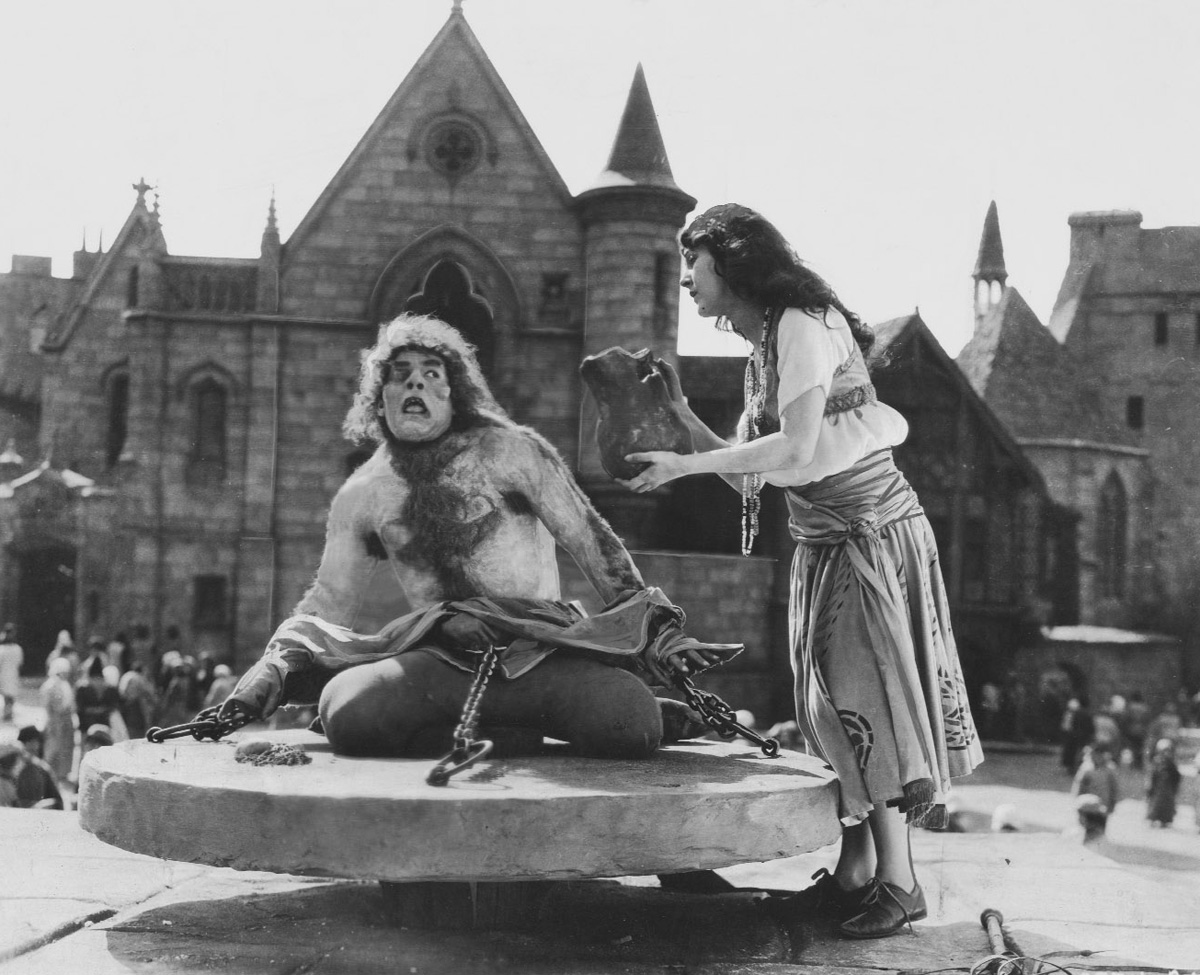
A still from The Hunchback of Notre Dame (1923) showing "Quasimodo" (Chaney) being offered water by "Esmeralda" (Patsy Ruth Miller)

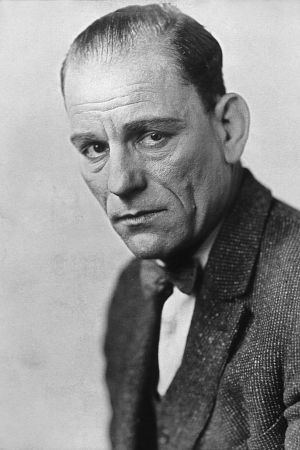
Chaney, 1923

Makeup in the early days of cinema was almost non-existent, with the exception of beards and mustaches to denote villains. Most of what the Hollywood studios knew about film stemmed from their experience with theater makeup, but this did not always transfer well to the big screen, especially as the film quality improved over time. Makeup departments were not yet in place during Chaney's time. Prior to the mid-20s, actors were expected to do their own makeup.

In the absence of such specialized professions, Chaney's skills gave him a competitive advantage over other actors. He was the complete package. Casting crews knew that they could place him in virtually any part and he would thrive. In some films his skill allowed him to play dual roles. An extreme case of this was the film Outside the Law (1920), where he played a character who shot and killed another character, whom he also was playing.

As Quasimodo, the bell ringer of Notre Dame Cathedral, and Erik, the "phantom" of the Paris Opera House, Chaney created two of the most grotesquely deformed characters in film history. "Phantom … became a legend almost immediately," wrote the Los Angeles Times in 1990. "The newspapers of the day reported that women fainted, children bawled and grown men stepped outside for fresh air after the famous unmasking scene." "The unmasking of the titular Phantom is one of the most well-known moments in silent film," wrote Meg Shields in 2020. "Arguably, it's one of the most horrifying images ever put on screen."

However, Chaney sought through his portrayals to elicit a degree of sympathy and pathos among viewers not overwhelmingly terrified or repulsed by the monstrous disfigurements of these victims of fate.

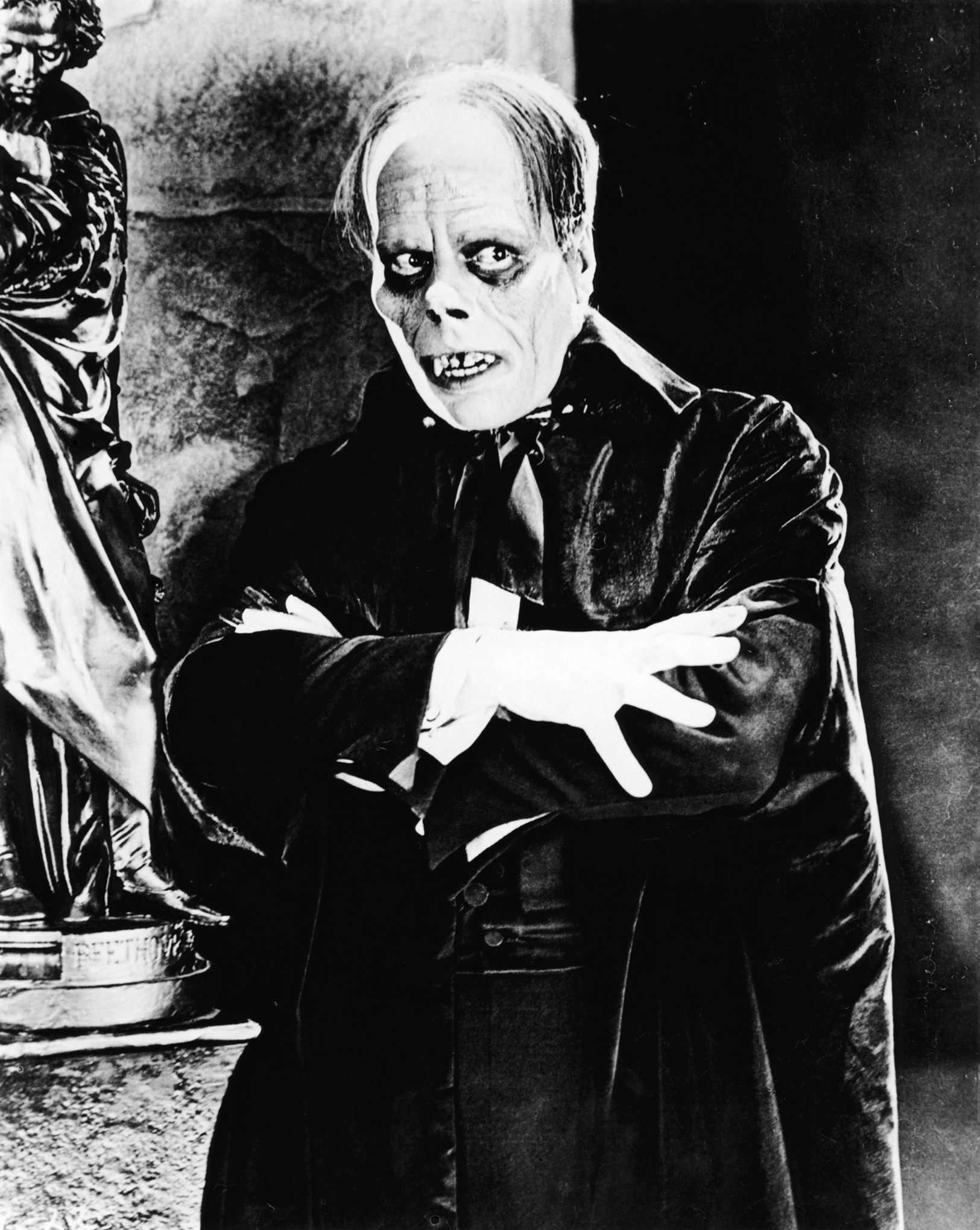
The Phantom of the Opera (1925)

In a 1925 autobiographical article for Movie magazine, he wrote: "I wanted to remind people that the lowest types of humanity may have within them the capacity for supreme self-sacrifice. The dwarfed, misshapen beggar of the streets may have the noblest ideals. Most of my roles since The Hunchback, such as The Phantom of the Opera, He Who Gets Slapped, The Unholy Three, etc., have carried the theme of self-sacrifice or renunciation. These are the stories which I wish to do." Chaney referred to his expertise in both makeup and contorting his body to portray his subjects as "extraordinary characterization". Chaney's talents extended beyond the horror genre and stage makeup. He was also a highly skilled dancer, singer and comedian.

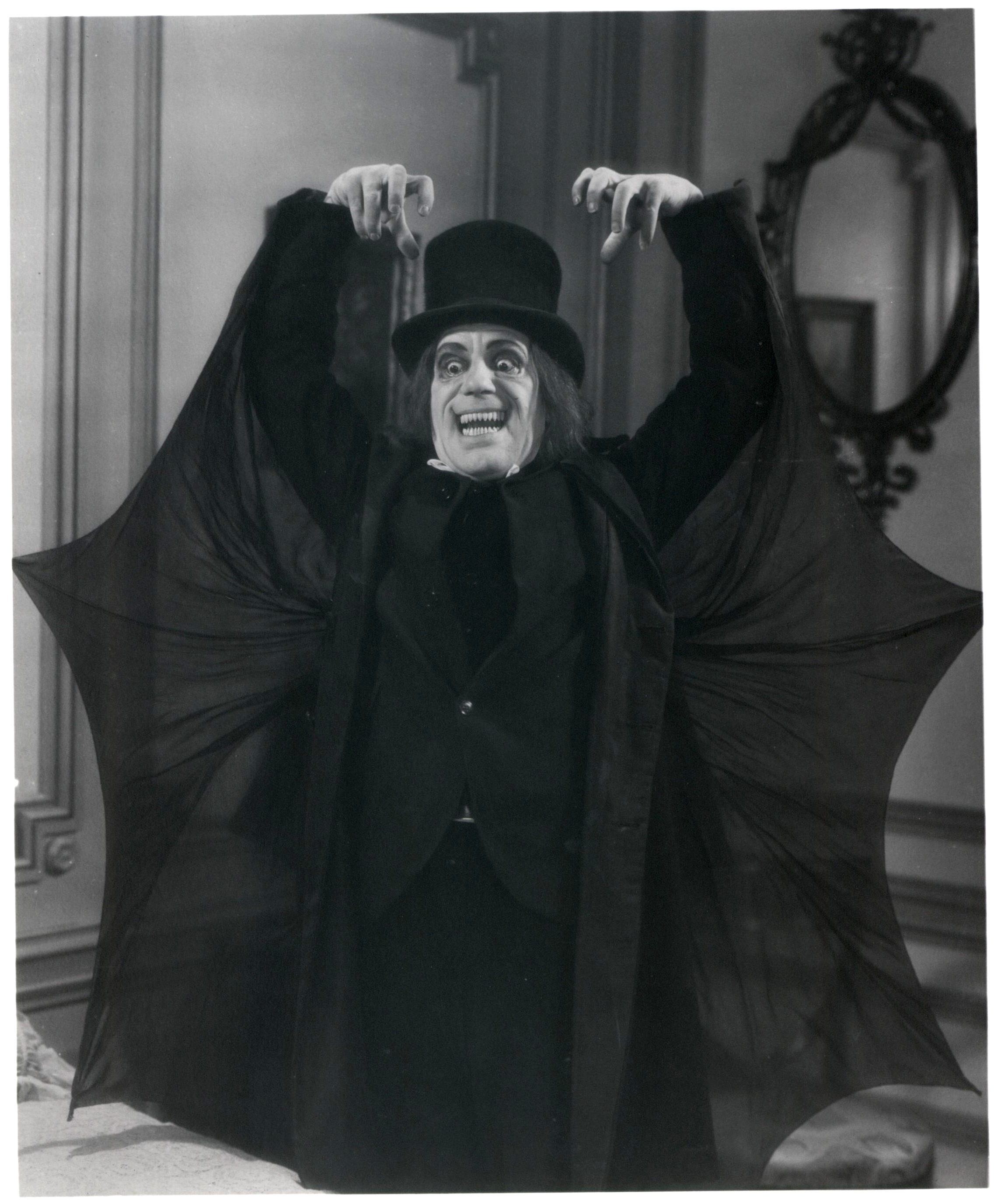
London After Midnight (1927)

Ray Bradbury once said of Chaney, "He was someone who acted out our psyches. He somehow got into the shadows inside our bodies; he was able to nail down some of our secret fears and put them on-screen. The history of Lon Chaney is the history of unrequited loves. He brings that part of you out into the open, because you fear that you are not loved, you fear that you never will be loved, you fear there is some part of you that's grotesque, that the world will turn away from."

Chaney and his second wife Hazel led a discreet private life distant from the Hollywood social scene. Chaney did minimal promotional work for his films and for Metro-Goldwyn-Mayer, purposefully fostering a mysterious image. He reportedly intentionally avoided the social scene in Hollywood.

In the final five years of his film career (1925–1930), Chaney worked exclusively under contract to Metro-Goldwyn-Mayer, giving some of his most memorable performances. His portrayal of a tough-as-nails marine drill instructor in Tell It to the Marines (1926), one of his favorite films, earned him the affection of the Marine Corps, who made him their first honorary member from the motion picture industry.

He also earned the respect and admiration of numerous aspiring actors, to whom he offered mentoring assistance. Between takes on film sets he was always willing to share his professional observations with the cast and crew. During the filming of The Unknown (1927), Joan Crawford stated that she learned more about acting from watching Chaney work than from anyone else in her career. "It was then," she said, "I became aware for the first time of the difference between standing in front of a camera, and acting."

Horror star Boris Karloff told a story of how he met Chaney one day while Karloff was sitting at a bus stop in the pouring rain. Driving out of the studio lot, Chaney spotted Karloff and offered him a ride. Chaney offered him advice, telling him to "find something that will set you apart and is different from anything anyone else has done, or is willing to do, and do it better".

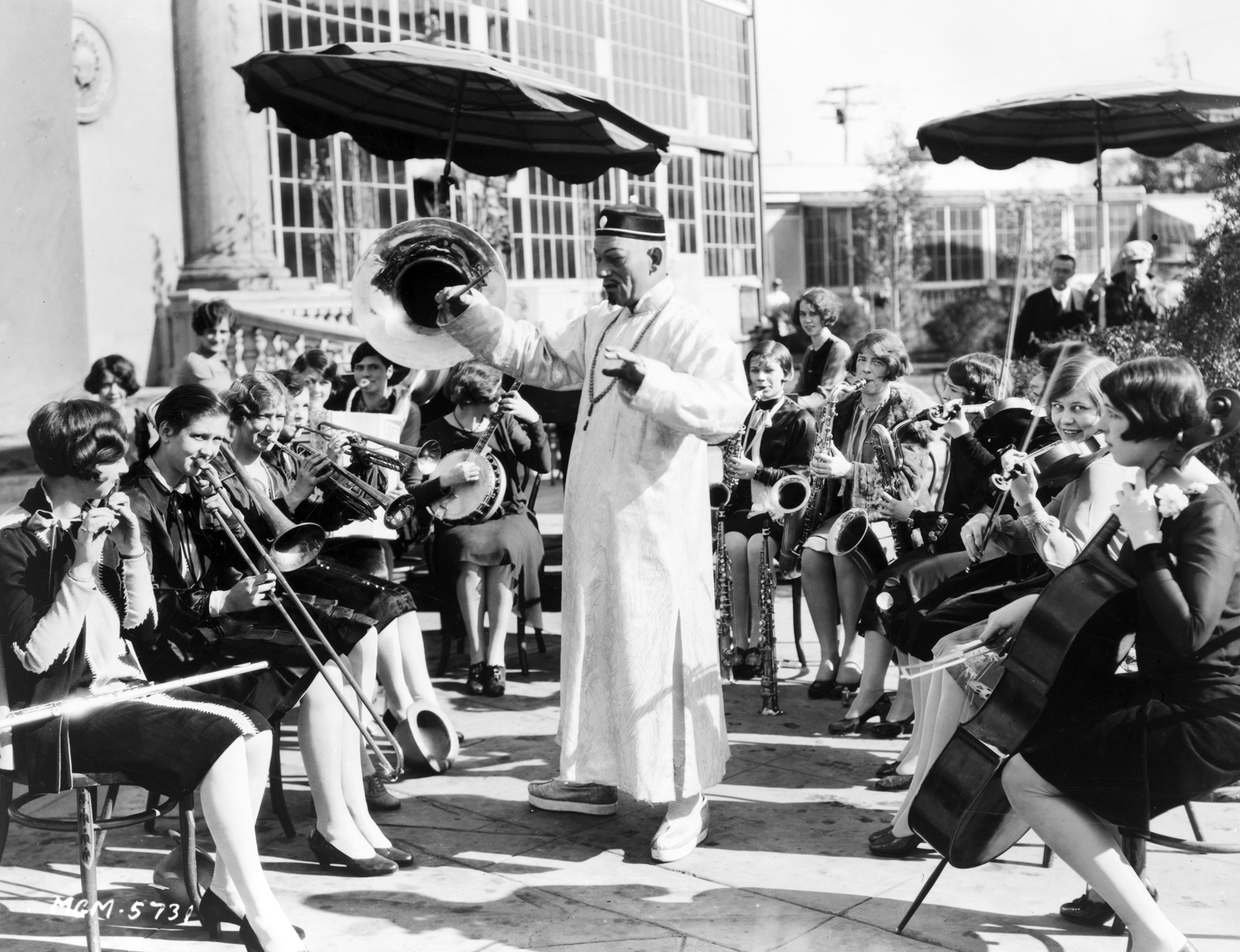
Chaney, in full makeup and attire of "Mr. Wu", conducts a women's orchestra, 1927

== Death ==
During the filming of Thunder in the winter of 1929, Chaney developed pneumonia. This was exacerbated when fake snow lodged in his throat during filming and caused a serious infection. In late 1929, he was diagnosed with bronchial lung cancer. Despite aggressive treatment, his condition gradually worsened, and he died of a throat hemorrhage on August 26, 1930, in a Los Angeles, California hospital. (Note: The New York Times reported: "Lon Chaney dies after brave fight. On road to recovery, screen actor is stricken by hemorrhage of the throat. Was a master of makeup. Son of deaf and dumb Parents, He began career as property boy. Excelled in vivid personations. Acted as Pike's Peak guide. Made stage debut at 17. Appeared in slap-stick comedy. Wore straitjacket as 'Hunchback.' New disguise for each film. Although he was believed to be on the road to recovery, Lon Chaney, screen actor, who had been making a valiant fight against anemia and bronchial congestion, died at 12:55.")

His funeral was held on August 28 in Glendale, California. Honorary pallbearers included Paul Bern, Hunt Stromberg, Irving Thalberg, Louis B. Mayer, Lionel Barrymore, Wallace Beery, Tod Browning, Lew Cody, and Ramon Novarro. The U.S. Marine Corps provided a chaplain and honor guard for his funeral. While his funeral was being conducted, all MGM studios and offices observed two minutes of silence.

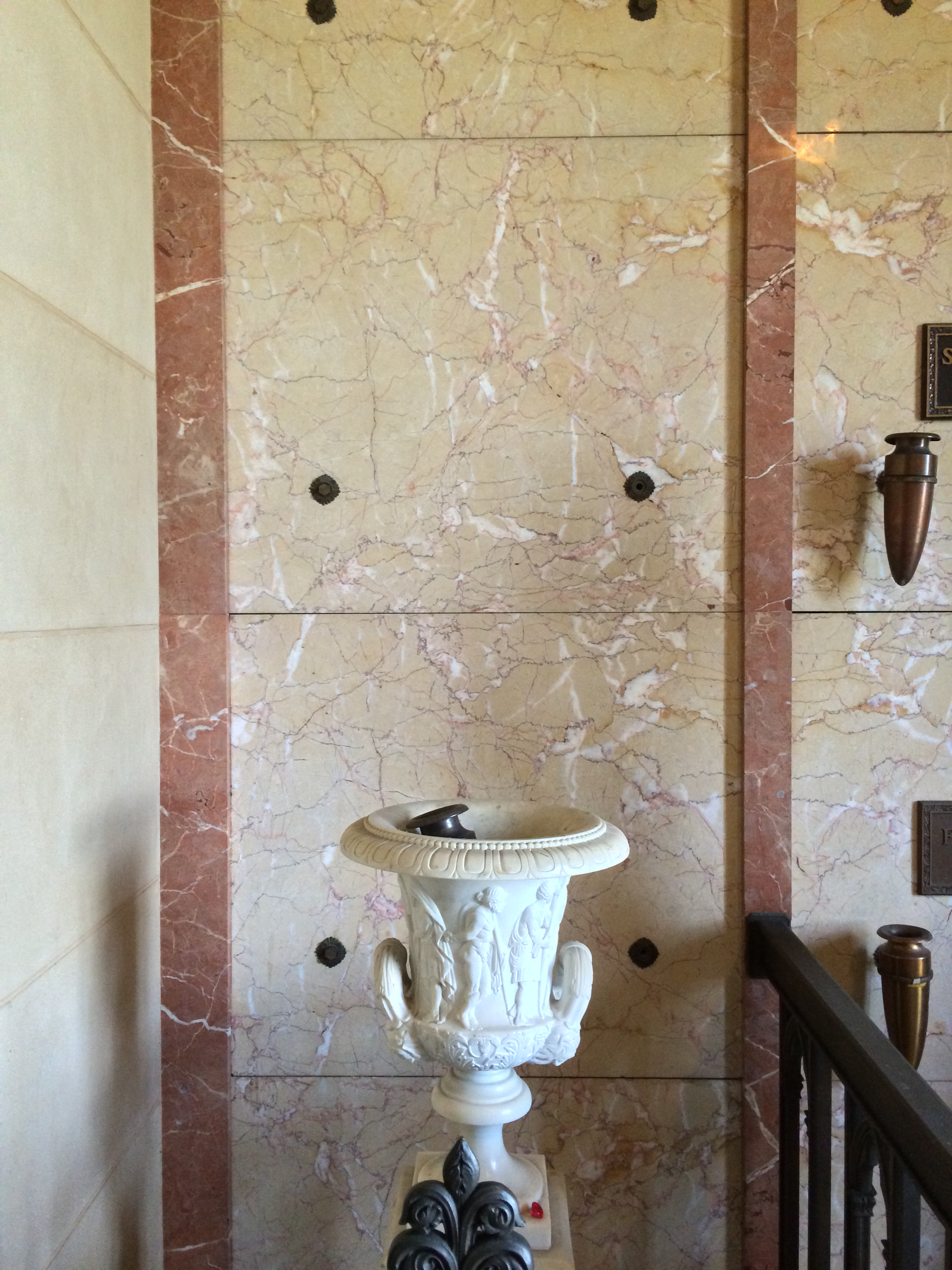
Chaney's unmarked crypt in the Great Mausoleum at Forest Lawn Memorial Park in Glendale, California

Chaney was entombed at Forest Lawn Memorial Park Cemetery in Glendale, next to the crypt of his father. His wife Hazel was interred there upon her death in 1933. In accordance with his will, Chaney's crypt has remained unmarked.

== Legacy ==
- Chaney has a star on the Hollywood Walk of Fame, located on Hollywood Boulevard.
- In 1957, Chaney was the subject of a biopic titled Man of a Thousand Faces, in which he was portrayed by James Cagney. The film is a largely fictionalized account, as Chaney was notoriously private and hated the Hollywood lifestyle. He never revealed personal details about himself or his family, once stating, "Between pictures, there is no Lon Chaney."
- Chaney's son Creighton, later known as Lon Chaney Jr., became a film actor after his father's death. Chaney Jr. is best remembered for roles in horror films, such as the title character in The Wolf Man (1941).
- In October 1997, both Chaneys appeared on commemorative US postage stamps as the Phantom of the Opera and the Wolf Man, with the set completed by Bela Lugosi as Count Dracula and Boris Karloff as Frankenstein's monster and the Mummy.
- Chaney is the subject of the 2000 documentary feature, Lon Chaney: A Thousand Faces. The film was produced by silent film historian Kevin Brownlow and narrated by Kenneth Branagh.
- In the song "Werewolves of London" by Warren Zevon, both Chaney and his son Lon Chaney Jr are namechecked in the last verse.
- In 2022, a biographical stage musical based on Chaney's life, titled A Thousand Faces: The Lon Chaney Musical, debuted at The Encore Musical Theatre Company, based in Dexter, Michigan. Chaney's character was played by Danny Gardner.

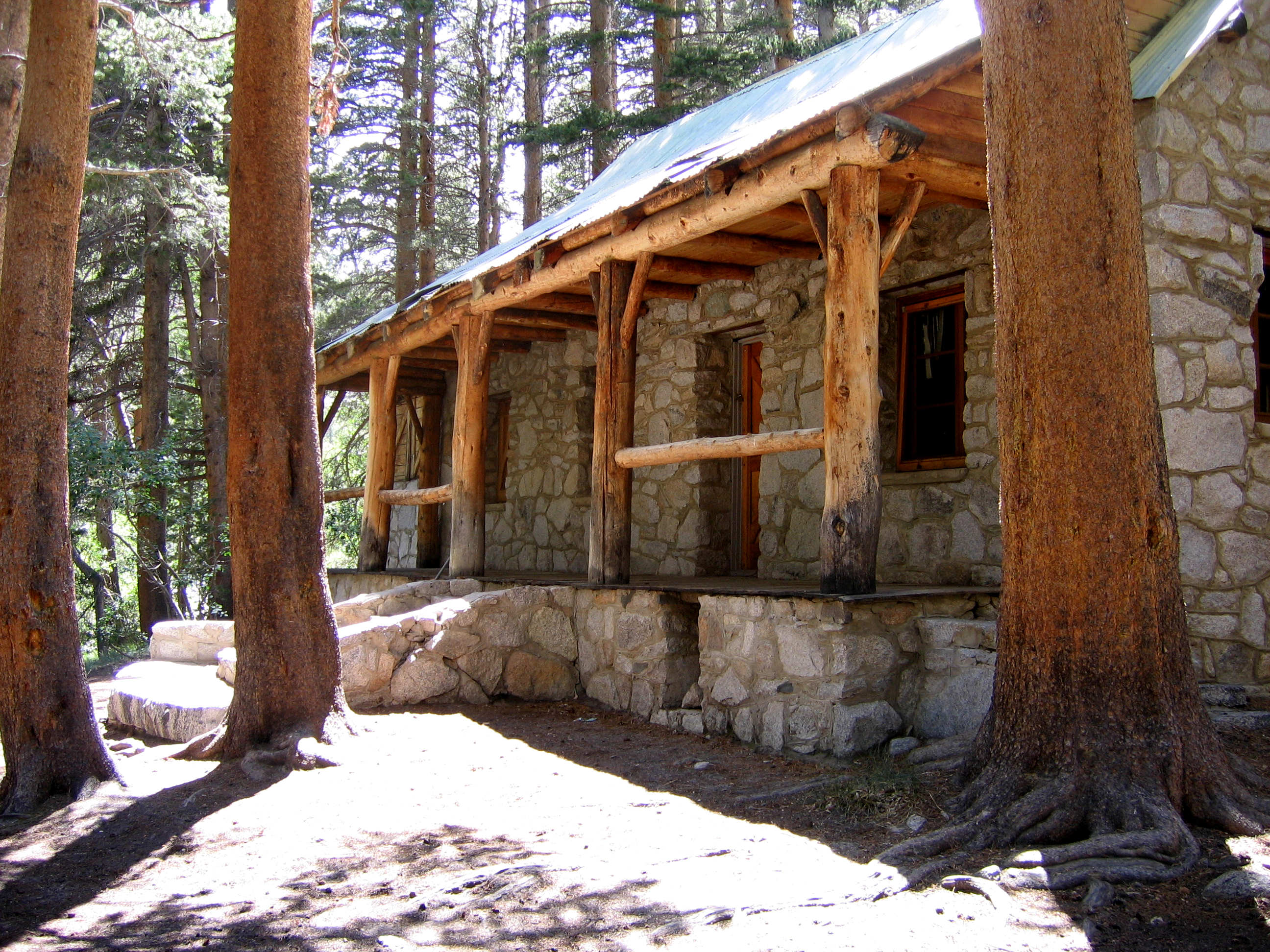
Chaney's Sierra Nevada House, located near Big Pine, California, was his mountain retreat.

- In 1929, Chaney built a stone cabin in the remote wilderness of the eastern Sierra Nevada near Big Pine, California as a retreat, hiring architect Paul R. Williams to design it. Located in the Inyo National Forest, the cabin still stands; it is not open to the public.
- In 1994, Al Hirschfeld's caricature of Chaney was featured on a commemorative United States postage stamp.
- Following his death, Chaney's famous makeup case was donated to the Los Angeles County Museum by his widow Hazel. The case is occasionally displayed for the public.
- The stage theater at the Colorado Springs Civic Auditorium is named after the actor.
- A street in San Antonio, Texas, is named after Chaney.

== Filmography ==
Lon Chaney made 157 films in total. One hundred are completely lost, and another 23 are partially lost. Only 34 are extant in their entirety.

Two of Chaney's films (The Phantom of the Opera and He Who Gets Slapped) have been inducted into Library of Congress' National Film Registry.

=== Short films ===
Year	Title	Role	Notes
1913	Poor Jake's Demise	Willy (The Dude) Mollycoddle	Chaney's first credited film appearance Eight minutes of footage discovered in 2006, restored.
1913	The Sea Urchin	Barnacle Bill	Lost film
1913	The Blood Red Tape of Charity	A Jewish pawnbroker (uncredited)	Lost film
1913	Shon the Piper	Scottish clansman (uncredited)	Also known as Shawn the Piper; Lost film
1913	The Trap	Lon (uncredited)	Lost film
1913	The Restless Spirit	The Russian Count wearing a beard (uncredited)	Lost film
1913	Almost an Actress	Lon plays a cameraman	Lost film
1913	An Elephant on His Hands	Eddie	Lost film
1913	Back to Life	The Rival	Lost film
1913	Red Margaret, Moonshiner	Lon (an old moonshiner with a wild beard)	Re-release title: Moonshine Blood; Lost film
1913	Bloodhounds of the North	Mountie lieutenant	Lost film
1914	The Lie	Young MacGregor	Lost film
1914	The Honor of the Mounted	Jacques Laquox	Lost film
1914	Remember Mary Magdalen	The half-wit	Lost film
1914	Discord and Harmony	Lon, a sculptor	Lost film
1914	The Menace to Carlotta	Giovanni Bartholdi	Chaney also wrote the screenplay Working title: Carlotta, the Bead Stringer; Lost film
1914	The Embezzler	J. Roger Dixon, a blackmailer	Lost film
1914	The Lamb, the Woman, the Wolf	The Wolf (a mountain man)	Lost film
1914	The End of the Feud	Wood Dawson	Lost film
1914	The Tragedy of Whispering Creek	The Greaser	Some sources say Chaney wrote the screenplay as well (but this is disputed); Print exists in the Deutsche Kinematek film archive
1914	The Unlawful Trade	The half-breed	Lost film
1914	The Forbidden Room	John Morris	Working title: The Web of Circumstance; Lost film
1914	The Old Cobbler	Wild Bill	Lost film
1914	A Ranch Romance	Raphael Praz	Lost film
1914	The Hopes of Blind Alley	The vendor	aka The Hopes of a Blind Alley; Lost film
1914	Her Grave Mistake	Nunez, a Mexican spy	Lost film
1914	By the Sun's Rays	Frank Lawler, the clerk	A 16mm. print of this film exists available on DVD
1914	The Oubliette	Chevalier Bertrand de la Payne	A nitrate print was discovered in Georgia in 1983. Alternate title: The Adventures of François Villon #1: The Oubliette
1914	A Miner's Romance	John Burns	Lost film
1914	Her Bounty	Fred Howard	Lost film
1914	The Higher Law	Sir Stephen Fitz Allen	Alternative title: The Adventures of François Villon #2: The Higher Law; Lost film
1914	Richelieu	Baradas, the villain	Lost film
1914	The Pipes o' Pan	Arthur Farrell	Some sequences were hand colored Lost film
1914	Virtue Is Its Own Reward	Duncan Bronson, an unsavory co-worker	In 2018, a 25-foot fragment of this film was discovered in a Brooklyn attic
1914	Her Life's Story	Don Valesquez, a nobleman	Lost film
1914	A Small Town Girl	A pimp	Released November 7, 1914; Lost film
1914	Lights and Shadows	Bentley, a wealthy man's son	Lost film
1914	The Lion, the Lamb, the Man	Fred Brown, the "Lion"	A 1-reel cutdown print survives with most of the opening footage removed
1914	A Night of Thrills	The Visitor	Lost film
1914	Her Escape	Pete Walsh, a blind man	Chaney also wrote the screenplay for this film Lost film
1915	The Sin of Olga Brandt	Stephen Leslie, an attorney	Lost film
1915	The Star of the Sea	Tomasco, a hunchbacked fisherman	Lost film
1915	The Measure of a Man	Mountie Lt. Jim Stuart	Lost film
1915	The Threads of Fate	The Count	The opening and closing scenes were hand colored Lost film
1915	When the Gods Played a Badger Game	Joe – the Property Man	Working title was The Girl Who Couldn't Go Wrong; Lost film
1915	Such Is Life	Tod Wilkes, a burlesque show performer	Lost film
1915	Where the Forest Ends	Paul Rouchelle, an artist	Lost film
1915	Outside the Gates	Perez, a peddler	Lost film
1915	All for Peggy	Seth Baldwin, the stable boy	Lost film
1915	The Desert Breed	Fred	Lost film
1915	Maid of the Mist	Lin – Pauline's Father	Lost film
1915	The Girl of the Night	Jerry, a small-time crook	Re-release title: Her Chance; Lost film
1915	The Stool Pigeon		Chaney directed this film (his first) but did not star in it Lost film
1915	The Grind	Henry Leslie	Released in UK as On the Verge of Sin; Lost film
1915	For Cash		Chaney directed this film but did not star in it Lost film
1915	An Idyll of the Hills	Lafe Jameson, moonshiner	Lost film
1915	The Stronger Mind	The Crook's Pal	Lost film
1915	The Oyster Dredger		Chaney wrote and directed this film but did not star in it Lost film
1915	Steady Company	Jimmy Ford, a warehouse employee	Lost film
1915	The Violin Maker	Pedro, the violin maker	Chaney directed this film Lost film
1915	The Trust	Jim Mason, a thief	Chaney directed this film Alternative title: The Truce; Lost film
1915	Bound on the Wheel	Tom Coulahan, a drunkard	Lost film
1915	Mountain Justice	Jeffrey Kirke, a moonshiner	Lost film
1915	Quits	Frenchy, a fugitive	Working title was The Sheriff of Long Butte (the title of the Jules Furthman story it was based on); released 8/17/15; one reel Lost film (a still from the film exists)
1915	The Chimney's Secret	Dual role: as both Charles Harding (the bank cashier) and as the miserly old beggar	Chaney wrote and directed this film Lost film
1915	The Pine's Revenge	Black Scotty, a criminal	The working title was The King's Keeper; Lost film
1915	The Fascination of the Fleur de Lis	Duke of Safoulrug	An incomplete print survives in the hands of a private collector in England
1915	Alas and Alack	Dual role: Jess's husband (a fisherman) and Hunchback Fate (in a fantasy sequence)	An incomplete print exists in the National Film Archives in London.
1915	A Mother's Atonement	Ben Morrison (as an old man and as his younger self)	Only the first two reels of the picture survive at the Library of Congress
1915	Lon of Lone Mountain	Lon Moore, a mountain man	Lost film
1915	The Millionaire Paupers	Martin, the building manager	The working title was Fate's A Fiddler; A brief fragment of the film exists in a private collection.
1915	Under a Shadow	DeSerris, a Secret Service agent	Lost film
1915	Stronger Than Death	An attorney	Lost film
1916	Dolly's Scoop	Dan Fisher, reporter	A print of the film survives, missing the main title but otherwise complete.
1916	Felix on the Job	Tod	released October 31, 1916; Lost film
1916	Accusing Evidence	Lon, a Canadian Mountie	Apparently filmed in 1914 but only released on November 23, 1916; Lost film
1917	The Mask of Love	Marino, an underworld criminal	Apparently filmed in 1914 but only released on March 19, 1917 Lost film

=== Feature films ===
Year	Title	Role	Notes
1915	Father and the Boys	Tuck Bartholomew	Lost film
1916	The Grip of Jealousy	Silas Lacey	Working title was Love Thine Enemy; Lost film
1916	Tangled Hearts	John Hammond	Roughly two minutes of footage exist in a private collection
1916	The Gilded Spider	Giovanni	Working title was The Full Cup; A print was rediscovered in 2008.
1916	Bobbie of the Ballet	Hook Hoover	Lost film
1916	The Grasp of Greed	Jimmie	About half the film still exists (incomplete print) at the George Eastman House Film Archive
1916	The Mark of Cain	Dick Temple	Chaney received first billing in this film for the first time in his career. Working title was By Fate's Decree. Lost film (only a few fragments exist in the Danish Film Archive)
1916	If My Country Should Call	Dr. George Ardrath	Incomplete print (reels 2, 3 and 5 of 5) exists at the National Archives of Canada and the Library of Congress.
1916	The Place Beyond the Winds	Jerry Jo	Working title was Mansion of Despair; Four of the five reels (reels 2, 3, 4 and 5) still survive in the film archive in the Library of Congress and in the National Archives of Canada.
1916	The Price of Silence	Dr. Edmond Stafford	A print exists in the CNC French Film Archives
1917	The Piper's Price	Billy Kilmartin	Lost film
1917	Hell Morgan's Girl	Sleter Noble	Working title was The Wrong Side of Paradise; Lost film
1917	The Girl in the Checkered Coat	Hector Maitland	Lost film
1917	The Flashlight	Dual Role as both Henry Norton and as Porter Brixton (two step-brothers)	Lost film
1917	A Doll's House	Nils Krogstad	Lost film
1917	Fires of Rebellion	Russell Hanlon	Lost film
1917	The Rescue	Thomas Holland	Lost film
1917	Pay Me!	Joe Lawson	Alternate title: Vengeance of the West
1917	Triumph	Paul Neihoff	An incomplete print consisting only of the first three reels were discovered in England and have been preserved at AMPAS
1917	The Empty Gun	Frank	Lost film
1917	Bondage	The Seducer	Uncredited (his appearance in this film is unconfirmed, but Blake's book says Chaney was in the film); Lost film
1917	Anything Once	Waught Moore	Working title was A Fool for Luck; a.k.a. The Maverick; Lost film
1917	The Scarlet Car	Paul Revere Forbes	Available on DVD; Clips were included in the 1995 documentary Lon Chaney: Behind the Mask
1918	Broadway Love	Elmer Watkins	A print of the film survives in the George Eastman Museum Motion Picture Collection and can be viewed online.
1918	The Grand Passion	Paul Argos	Working title was The Boss of Powderville; Lost film
1918	The Kaiser, the Beast of Berlin	Bethmann-Hollweg	Lost film
1918	Fast Company	Dan McCarty	Lost film
1918	A Broadway Scandal	"Kink" Colby	Lost film
1918	Riddle Gawne	Hame Bozzam	Two of the five reels exist in the Library of Congress (incomplete print)
1918	That Devil, Bateese	Louis Courteau	Lost film
1918	The Talk of the Town	Jack Lanchome (Langhorne in some sources)	Based on a novelette called Discipline of Genevra; Lost film
1918	Danger, Go Slow	Bud	Lost film
1919	The False Faces	Karl Eckstrom, a German spy	Based on the novel by Louis Joseph Vance; The film's working title was The Lone Wolf; Complete print exists at the George Eastman House; Available on DVD
1919	The Wicked Darling	Stoop Connors	Chaney's first collaboration with Tod Browning; Working titles were The Gutter Rose and Rose of the Night; A complete print (with some decomposition) exists at the Netherlands Filmmuseum in Amsterdam; Available on DVD
1919	A Man's Country	"Three Card" Duncan	A small portion of this film was discovered at the Danish Film Institute film archive in Denmark. The fragment does not contain any of Chaney's scenes
1919	The Miracle Man	The Frog	Lost film A 3-minute fragment exists showing Chaney in the faith healing sequence
1919	Paid in Advance	Bateese Le Blanc	A nitrate stock print (with Czech subtitles) is housed at the Narodni Filmovy Archive in Czechoslovakia
1919	When Bearcat Went Dry	Kindard Powers	A complete print exists at the American Film Institute, donated by a collector
1919	Victory	Ricardo	With Wallace Beery; complete film available on DVD
1920	Daredevil Jack	Royce Rivers, bandit leader	15-chapter serial Segments of this film (mainly Chapters 1, 2 and 4) are stored at the University of California, Los Angeles Chaney does not appear in the existing footage
1920	Treasure Island	Dual role as two pirates, Blind Pew and Merry	Lost film
1920	The Gift Supreme	Merney Stagg	An incomplete print (reel one of six) survives and is preserved in a private collection.
1920	Nomads of the North	Raoul Challoner	Available on DVD
1920	The Penalty	Blizzard	Available on DVD
1920	Outside the Law	Dual role as Black Mike Sylva and Ah Wing	Print exists in the Film Preservation Associates film collection Available on DVD.
1921	For Those We Love	Trix Ulner	Lost film
1921	Bits of Life	Chin Chow	Lost film
1921	The Ace of Hearts	Farallone	Available on DVD
1921	Voices of the City	Red O'Rourke, gangster	Released originally as The Night Rose, the film was then re-edited and retitled Voices of the City; Chaney's character's name was changed from Red O'Rourke to Duke McGee; Lost film
1922	The Trap	Gaspard	Chaney also co-wrote the story that this film was based on Released in the UK as Heart of a Wolf
1922	Flesh and Blood	David Webster	Working title was Fires of Vengeance; re-released in 1927; available on DVD
1922	The Light in the Dark	Tony Pantelli	Later edited down into a shorter version called The Light of Faith; Only the short version is available on DVD
1922	Oliver Twist	Fagin	Available on DVD
1922	Shadows	Yen Sin, the Heathen	Available on DVD
1922	Quincy Adams Sawyer	Obadiah Strout	Lost film
1922	A Blind Bargain	Dual Role as Dr. Arthur Lamb/ The Ape Man	Based on the novel The Octave of Claudius; Lost film
1923	All the Brothers Were Valiant	Mark Shore	Lost film
1923	While Paris Sleeps	Henri Santodos, a sculptor	Working title was The Glory of Love; Film was made in 1920, but only released in 1923; Lost film
1923	The Shock	Wilse Dilling	Working title was Bittersweet; Available on DVD
1923	The Hunchback of Notre Dame	Quasimodo	Assisted as makeup artist (uncredited); Available on DVD
1924	The Next Corner	Juan Serafin	Lost film
1924	He Who Gets Slapped	Dual role as both Paul Beaumont and "HE"	Available on DVD; Inducted into National Film Registry in 2017.
1925	The Monster	Dr. Ziska	Available on DVD
1925	The Phantom of the Opera	The Phantom	Asst. director, makeup (uncredited); Available on DVD; Inducted to National Film Registry in 1998.
1925	The Unholy Three	Dual role as Echo and the Old Lady	Remade as a sound film in 1930, again starring Chaney; Available on DVD
1925	The Tower of Lies	Jan	Lost film
1926	The Blackbird	Dual role as The Blackbird and The Bishop	A.k.a. The Black Bird; Available on DVD
1926	The Road to Mandalay	Singapore Joe	The film's working title was Singapore; A condensed version with French subtitles exists in some museums
1926	Tell It to the Marines	Sergeant O'Hara	Available on DVD
1927	Mr. Wu	Dual role as Mr. Wu and Mr. Wu's grandfather	Available on DVD
1927	The Unknown	Alonzo the Armless	Available on DVD
1927	Mockery	Sergei, a Russian peasant	Working title was Terror; Available on DVD
1927	London After Midnight	Dual role as Professor Edward C. Burke and The Vampire	Alternate title: The Hypnotist; Makeup artist also (uncredited); Lost film
1928	The Big City	Chuck Collins	Lost film
1928	Laugh, Clown, Laugh	Tito the Clown	A near complete print exists Available on DVD
1928	While the City Sleeps	Dan Coghlan	Incomplete print with some wear exists in some collections
1928	West of Zanzibar	Phroso	Available on DVD
1929	Where East Is East	Tiger Haynes	Available on DVD
1929	Thunder	Grumpy Anderson	Mostly a lost film; only a few minutes survives
1930	The Unholy Three (Sound Remake)	Dual role as Echo and the Old Lady	Available on DVD. Final film.

== Gallery: The Man of a Thousand Faces ==
Blind Pew in Treasure Island (1920)

Fagin in Oliver Twist (1922)

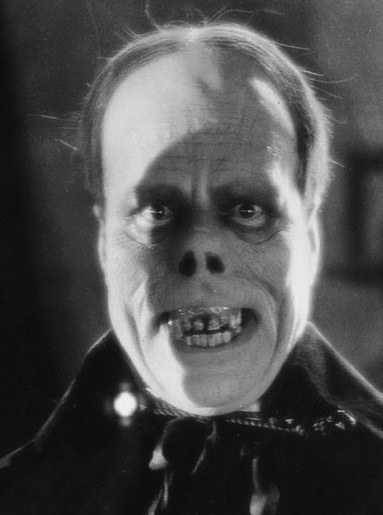
Erik in The Phantom of the Opera (1925)

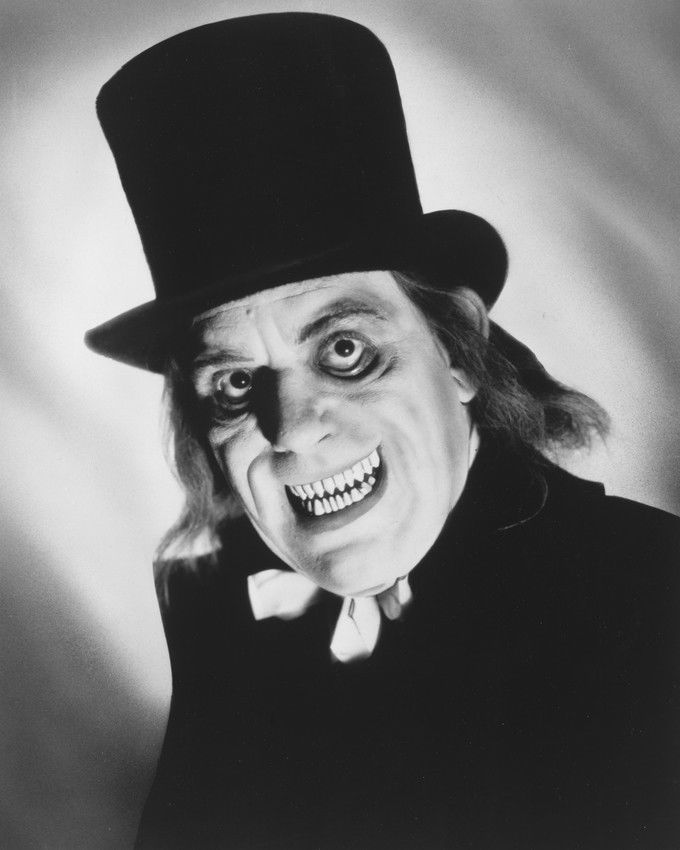
"Hypnotist" in London After Midnight (1927)

== Bibliography ==
- Anderson, Robert Gordon. Faces, Forms, Films: The Artistry of Lon Chaney. South Brunswick, New Jersey: A. S. Barnes, 1971. ISBN 978-0-4980-7726-5.
- Blackmar, Frank W., ed. Kansas: A Cyclopedia of State History, Embracing Events, Institutions, Industries, Counties, Cities, Towns, Prominent Persons, etc.. Chicago : Standard Publishing Company, 1912.
- Blake, Michael F. A Thousand Faces: Lon Chaney's Unique Artistry in Motion Pictures. Vestal, New York: Vestal Press, 1997. ISBN 978-1-8795-1121-7.
- Blake, Michael F. Lon Chaney: The Man Behind the Thousand Faces. Vestal, New York: Vestal Press, 1997.
- Blake, Michael F. (1998). The Films of Lon Chaney. Vestal, New York: Vestal Press. ISBN 978-1-5683-3237-6. OCLC 49379606.
- Blum, Daniel. Pictorial History of the Silent Screen. New York: Grosset and Dunlap, 1953. ISBN 978-0-4480-1477-7.
- Dick, Bernard F. City of Dreams: The Making and Remaking of Universal Pictures. Lexington, Kentucky: The University Press of Kentucky, 1997. ISBN 978-0-8131-2016-4.
- Fleming, E. J. Paul Bern: The Life and Famous Death of the Metro-Goldwyn-Mayer Director and Husband of Harlow. Jefferson, North Carolina: McFarland & Company, 2009. ISBN 978-0-7864-3963-8.
- Guiley, Rosemary. The Encyclopedia of Vampires, Werewolves, and Other Monsters. New York: Infobase Publishing, 2004. ISBN 978-0-8160-4684-3.
- Herzogenrath, Bernd, ed. The Cinema of Tod Browning: Essays of the Macabre and Grotesque. Jefferson, North Carolina: McFarland & Company, 2008. ISBN 978-0-7864-3447-3.
- LaSalle, Mick. Complicated Women: Sex and Power in Pre-Code Hollywood. New York: Thomas Dunne Books, an imprint of St. Martin's Press, 2000. ISBN 978-0-3122-8431-2.
- Locan, Clarence A. "The Lon Chaney I Knew," Photoplay, November 1930, p. 58.
- "Lon Chaney's Make-up," Photoplay, March 1922, p. 43.
- Riley, Philip J. MagicImage Filmbooks Presents The Wolf Man. Chesterfield, New Jersey: MagicImage Filmbooks, 1993. ISBN 978-1-8821-2721-4.
- Sangster, Margaret E. "Lon Chaney" (poem), Photoplay, October 1930, p. 40.
- Schikel, Richard and Allen Hurlburt. The Stars. New York: Bonanza Books, a division of Crown Publishers, 1962. ISBN 978-0-5170-3771-3.
- Slide, Anthony. Silent Players: A Biographical and Autobiographical Study of 100 Silent Film Actors and Actresses. Lexington, Kentucky: University Press of Kentucky, 2010. ISBN 978-0-8131-2249-6.
- Smith, Don G. Lon Chaney Jr.: Horror Film Star, 1906–1973. Jefferson, North Carolina: McFarland & Company, 2004. ISBN 978-0-7864-1813-8.
- Vogel, Michelle. Olive Borden: The Life and Films of Hollywood's "Joy Girl". Jefferson, North Carolina: McFarland & Company, 2010. ISBN 978-0-7864-4795-4.
