= An Idyll of the Hills =

1915 film

- Directed by: Joe De Grasse
- Written by: Ida May Park
- Starring: Lon Chaney; Pauline Bush
- Distributed by: Universal Film Manufacturing Company
- Release date: May 15, 1915
- Running time: 2 reels (20 minutes)
- Country: United States
- Languages: Silent; English intertitles

An Idyll of the Hills is a 1915 American short silent drama film directed by Joe De Grasse and featuring Lon Chaney and Pauline Bush. The film is now presumed lost.

== Plot ==
Kate Graham is the prettiest girl in Breathitt County in the backwoods mountains of Kentucky. Two men are in love with her: Lafe Jameson, the leader of a feared gang of moonshiners, and Dick Massey, a handsome young man who longs for the opportunity to better himself. Dick is secretly learning to read, but one day Kate ignorantly ridicules him for trying to read, causing him to hide his book under a log and abandon his studies. Kate meets Frank Collins, a city man who is on vacation in the mountains, and she saves him from being bitten by a snake. She strikes up a friendship with Frank, but Lafe becomes violently jealous.

Not wishing to stir up any trouble, Frank Collins writes Lafe a letter stating that he has no interest whatsoever in the girl, and bluntly describes her as crude and ignorant. But neither Kate not Lafe can read the letter, so they ask Collins to read it to them. He tactlessly reads them the insulting note, and Kate flies into a rage. Meanwhile, Lafe convinces his clan that Collins is a Tax Revenuer and has come there to collect evidence against their moonshining operation.

Dick is given the task of murdering Frank Collins, but when he arrives at the camp, Collins convinces Dick that he is not a government agent. As Dick leaves, he hears a gunshot and sees Collins writhing on the ground, wounded. Dick doesn't realize that Collins accidentally shot himself. Thinking that Kate shot the man, Dick confesses to the shooting, but Collins doesn't die from his wound and later admits to everyone that he shot himself accidentally with his own gun. Kate realizes now how much Dick loves her, and they go off to study his book together.

== Cast ==
- Pauline Bush as Kate Graham
- Millard K. Wilson as Dick Massey
- Lon Chaney as Lafe Jameson
- William C. Dowlan as Frank Collins
- Laura Oakley as Mrs. Graham

== Reception ==
"This situation is unique and lifts and otherwise ordinary production considerably in plot interest. Lon Chaney does a good piece of character work in this." ---Moving Picture World

"The story of this is very good but there is hardly enough action to sustain the interest over two thousand feet. A few of the episodes of the story are none too clearly put. The photography and the scenes are very good."
