= A Miner's Romance =

1914 film

- Directed by: unknown
- Written by: Seymour Hastings
- Produced by: Nestor Film Co.
- Starring: Murdock MacQuarrie; Agnes Vernon; Lon Chaney
- Distributed by: Universal Pictures
- Release date: August 26, 1914
- Running time: 20 minutes (2 reels)
- Country: United States
- Languages: Silent; English intertitles

A Miner's Romance is a 1914 American silent Western film featuring Lon Chaney and Murdock MacQuarrie. It is unknown who directed this film. The film is now considered to be lost.

== Plot ==
John Burns is chased by a bear and falls off a cliff. A young miner named Bob Jenkins finds the unconscious Burns and takes him to his cabin. Bob nurses Burns back to health and they become friends. Dave Williams and his beautiful daughter Lucy arrive in town, and she and Bob soon fall in love. Burns also falls in love with her, but she clearly prefers Bob.

Filled with jealousy, Burns plots to kill Bob and rigs a gun in Bob's cabin with a string connecting the doorknob to the gun's trigger, so that Bob will be shot when he opens the cabin door. His plan backfires however when some mice chew through the string. Bob finds the gun later and realizing it was set up to kill him, he purposely fires off a shot. Burns, thinking that Bob is dead, drags Lucy off into the wilderness, but Bob leads a posse to rescue her and Burns is killed.

== Cast ==
- Murdock MacQuarrie as Bob Jenkins
- Agnes Vernon as Lucy Williams
- Lon Chaney as John Burns
- Seymour Hastings as Dave Williams

== Reception ==
Moving Picture World stated: "The scenic effects about the placer camp are good; the story contains some old features, but holds the attention."
