= Her Escape =

1914 film

- Directed by: Joe De Grasse
- Written by: Lon Chaney
- Produced by: Rex Film Co.
- Starring: Lon Chaney; Pauline Bush
- Distributed by: Universal Pictures
- Release date: December 27, 1914
- Running time: 2 reels (20 minutes)
- Country: United States
- Language: Silent with English intertitles

Her Escape is a 1914 American silent drama film directed by Joe De Grasse and featuring Lon Chaney and Pauline Bush. Lon Chaney not only acted in this film, he also wrote the screenplay. The Blake book on Chaney states the film was actually released earlier on December 13, 1914, but all other sources say December 27. The film is now considered to be lost.

A creepy still exists of Chaney in the role of Pete, the blind man, showing him attacking his sister in the film (see plot synopsis). Chaney played the blind man in this film simply by rolling his eyes up into his head, similar to the method he used to play Pew, the blind pirate, in Treasure Island (1920).

== Plot ==
Tom Walsh and his son Pete Walsh are criminals, but his daughter Pauline is basically a good kid. One day, while they are forcing her to act as a lookout for them, a group of Salvation Army singers gives her a pamphlet on how to lead a good life. Pauline tells her father and brother that she wants to repent and cannot go on aiding them in their life of crime any more. In a wild rage, Tom attacks his daughter with a knife, but he falls down the stairs and is killed.

Pauline relocates to a much nicer town where she gets a job as nurse to a wealthy family that is planning to move out west. Pete follows her to her new home and confronts her in a park one day. Paul Reeves, a rich young mine owner, sees Pete harassing the young woman and comes to her rescue, knocking Pete down. Paul and Pauline soon after fall in love and get married.

Meanwhile, her brother Pete has become the leader of an outlaw gang and is befriended by a drug addict he helps out in a barroom brawl. Pete is permanently blinded in a bar when a shaken beer bottle explodes in his eyes, and the dope addict becomes Pete's permanent companion. Soon after, Pete learns of his sister's marriage from the society pages of a newspaper. The dope fiend leads Pete to Pauline's home where Pete tries to get her to give him a large sum of money. She refuses and when Pete threatens to kill her, she flees. As Pete chases her, he falls down a flight of stairs and breaks his neck, dying the same way his father had done.

== Cast ==
- Pauline Bush as Pauline Walsh
- William C. Dowlan as Paul (Pauline's husband)
- Lon Chaney as Pete Walsh (Pauline's brother)
- Richard Rosson as the Dope Fiend
- Laura Oakley in an Undetermined Role

== Reception ==
"Not many dramas are as tense and full of action as this. Produced by Joseph De Grasse, this film bears the marks of fine direction."—Motion Picture News

"The (villain) is played by Lon Chaney, the author, and his character dominates the story...The picture tells its story pretty well and its big situation is certainly striking. The spirit of it is not of the highest; although there is nothing vulgar about it." --- Moving Picture World
