= Her Grave Mistake =

1914 film

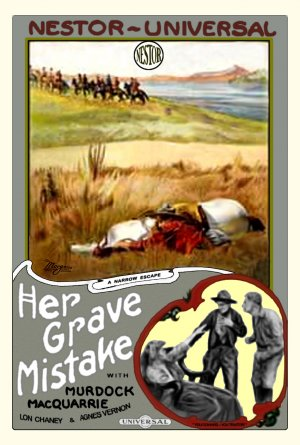
- Theatrical poster to Her Grave Mistake
- Produced by: Nestor Film Co.
- Starring: Murdock MacQuarrie; Agnes Vernon; Lon Chaney
- Distributed by: Universal Pictures
- Release date: July 15, 1914
- Running time: 20 minutes
- Country: United States
- Languages: Silent; English intertitles

Her Grave Mistake is a 1914 American silent Western film featuring Lon Chaney and Murdock MacQuarrie. Very little is known about who wrote or directed this film. The film is now considered to be lost.

== Plot ==
Roger Grant, foreman of the "Circle S" Ranch on the Mexican border, is engaged to Isabel Norris, the old ranch-owner's daughter. Grant receives word from the national guard warning him that there may be an attack by Mexicans on the pumping station at the reservoir and that he should arm his cowboys to protect it until troops can arrive. Nunez, a Mexican spy, breaks into the ranch house to steal the letter that Grant received.

When she goes to rendezvous with Grant at the ranch house, Isabel is attacked by Nunez and is choked unconscious. Grant finds Isabel on the floor and he is blamed for assaulting her. The cowboys chase after him, but Isabel awakens, finds a piece of Nunez's hat on the floor and rides out after the posse to tell them that Grant is innocent. Meanwhile, the Mexicans have attacked the reservoir, but Grant battles them all single-handed until Isabel and the reinforcements arrive. Nunez is captured and Grant is vindicated.

== Cast ==
- Murdock MacQuarrie as Roger Grant
- Agnes Vernon as Isabel Norris
- Seymour Hastings as Isabel's father, the ranch owner
- Lon Chaney as Nunez

== Reception ==
Moving Picture World wrote: "A Mexican borderline story.....The chief interest centers about an attack on the pumping station...There is good suspense toward the close of this, and the climax is exciting."

Motion Picture News wrote: "The story is not at all original, but Mr. MacQuarrie has a way of putting anything over he tries."
