= The Stronger Mind =

1915 film

- Directed by: Joe De Grasse
- Written by: Ida May Park
- Starring: Lon Chaney; Pauline Bush; Murdock MacQuarrie
- Production company: United Film Service
- Distributed by: Universal Pictures
- Release date: May 15, 1915
- Running time: 2 reels (20 minutes)
- Country: United States
- Language: Silent with English intertitles

The Stronger Mind is a 1915 American silent drama film directed by Joe De Grasse and featuring Lon Chaney, Murdock MacQuarrie and Pauline Bush. Chaney did not routinely work for the United production unit at Universal, and was obviously sent over as a one-time loan-out for this production. It is now considered to be a lost film. A still exists showing MacQuarrie and Chaney as the two bank robbers.

Like many American films of the time, The Stronger Mind was subject to cuts by city and state film censorship boards. For example, the Chicago Board of Censors in 1918 required cuts in Reel 1 of the burglar sandpapering his pal's fingers and of the burglars working on the safe.

== Plot ==
A Crook and his Pal are interrupted while trying to rob a bank and are forced to split up. Fearing capture, the Crook leaves town and hides out in a Western mining town. There he meets the Girl, who folks call the "Good Angel" because he devotes her life looking after the needs of others. The Crook disguises himself as a minister and, under the good influence of the Girl, decides to reform himself.

The Crook informs his Pal of his decision to go straight, but the Pal comes into town and persuades his friend to rob the local bank (thus the title of the film referring to the Chaney character). Coincidentally, the Girl's father is employed at the bank as a night watchman. In the attempted robbery, the Crook's Pal is killed, and the Crook is redeemed by the Girl's love and decides to go straight.

== Cast ==
- Murdock MacQuarrie as A Crook
- Pauline Bush as The Girl
- Lon Chaney as The Crook's Pal

== Reception ==
"This is an engaging drama, produced well with several new twists to the old story. The scenes are characteristic in every instance, some of the Western exteriors are especially beautiful...Lon Chaney is effective as the master criminal." ---Motion Picture News

"A two-reel production which in its finished condition....promises to be unusually interesting. Pauline Bush plays the feminine lead, and as the woman whose courage and strength of purpose never failed her, she is beyond criticism. The story is of a man who was influenced by a bad companion to become a thief. He runs away eventually, and lands out west, where he tries to correct his methods of living. His former pal follows him, and the battle as to what the final result will be is won by the woman, whose mind is the stronger one." --- Moving Picture World
