= Maid of the Mist (film) =

1915 film

- Directed by: Joe De Grasse
- Written by: James Dayton
- Starring: Lon Chaney; Pauline Bush
- Distributed by: Universal Pictures
- Release date: April 1, 1915
- Running time: 1 reel (approximately 10 minutes)
- Country: United States
- Language: Silent with English intertitles

Maid of the Mist is a 1915 American silent drama film directed by Joe De Grasse, written by James Dayton and featuring Lon Chaney and Pauline Bush. The film is now considered to be lost. The Blake book on Chaney oddly lists Chaney as playing "Jed, the postmaster" in the film, but all other sources claim Chaney played the heroine's father, Lin.

== Plot ==
Ray, a young novelist, sets out for the mountains, seeking a place to write his new book. He meets Pauline and falls in love with her. Ray's millionaire father had forbidden him to marry until he was 25 years old as an instruction in his will. When Ray receives a notice that he must return to the city at once, he fears losing Pauline. Ray marries Pauline but they keep the wedding a secret. Jed, the local postmaster, is in love with Pauline himself, and he intercepts all the mail that goes to and from Ray while he is living in the city, so Pauline doesn't hear from her newlywed husband at all any more. Thinking Ray has abandoned her, Pauline moves to a distant mining town with her father, Lin. Meanwhile, Ray is curious as to why Pauline never writes to him. When Ray returns to the mountain town, he finds his wife and her father no longer live there.

Ray publishes his book entitled "The Maid of the Mist" and puts a photograph of Pauline on the fly leaf. Pauline gives birth to their child, and not realizing his daughter was legally married, Lin swears revenge on the man who has dishonored her. One day, Lin finds a copy of Ray's novel left behind by some tourists, sees Pauline's picture in the book, and goes to the big city to find the author. When Ray is confronted by Pauline's father, he shows him their marriage certificate and explains how he and Pauline got separated by chance. Ray is happily reunited with Pauline and their baby.

== Cast ==
- Pauline Bush as Pauline
- Ray Gallagher as Ray, Pauline's husband
- Lon Chaney as Lin, Pauline's father
- W. H. Buchman as Jed, the postmaster

== Reception ==
"A strong one-reel subject, with Lon Chaney, Pauline Bush and Ray Gallegher in the cast. The young novelist and the country girl marry secretly and separate until he comes into his fortune. The jealous postmaster intercepts their letters, but they are reunited happily in the end. This is a pleasing subject throughout." ---Moving Picture World
