= Such Is Life (1915 film) =

1915 film

- Directed by: Joe De Grasse
- Written by: unknown
- Produced by: Rex Motion Picture Co.
- Starring: Lon Chaney; Pauline Bush
- Distributed by: Universal Pictures
- Release date: March 4, 1915
- Running time: 2 reels (20 minutes)
- Country: United States
- Language: Silent with English intertitles

Such Is Life is a 1915 American silent drama film directed by Joe De Grasse and featuring Lon Chaney, Pauline Bush and Olive Carey. The film is now considered to be lost.

== Plot ==
Polly, the maid at a theatrical boarding house, falls in love with Will Deming, a handsome stage actor living at the house. Will is the only one in the place who pays any attention to Polly whatsoever. She often dreams of herself as Mrs. Will Deming. Meanwhile Olive Trent, an aspiring young actress, rents a room at the house while trying to break into show business. Will sees Olive at an agency and tries to help her start a career, but she rejects his advances, not realizing he's just trying to help her out. Will doesn't realize that he and Olive actually live in the same house.

Tod Wilkes, a comic burlesque performer also living at the house, has his eye on Olive as well, and he offers her a degrading job in his seedy burlesque show. At first she refuses, but eventually accepts when her money runs out. After rehearsing with Tod in his room one night, he grabs her and tries to molest her passionately. She manages to escape and on the way back to her own room, she is spotted by Will who offers her a respectable job with his company. Will and Olive both leave together the next day for Syracuse to begin their new project, while Polly sadly watches their departure. Neither of them even say goodbye to her. Polly sadly shakes her head and mutters "Such is life."

== Cast ==
- Pauline Bush as Polly
- William C. Dowlan as Will Deming
- Olive Carey as Olive Trent
- Lon Chaney as Tod Wilkes, the seedy burlesque performer
- Felix Walsh

== Reception ==
"This story...is so interesting the observer wishes there was another reel. All the types are good; the slavey (maid), the burlesque man (Chaney), the matinee idol and the girl looking for her first engagement. The entire cast is pleasing. The slavey sacrifices her own love to save the girl's happiness. A pleasing offering."—Moving Picture World

"This comedy-drama features Pauline Bush.....The picture contains a number of pathetic themes and others which are equally humorous. A nice combination"—Motion Picture News
