= Stronger Than Death (1915 film) =

1915 film

- Directed by: Joe De Grasse
- Written by: Bess Meredyth
- Produced by: Rex Film Co.
- Starring: Lon Chaney; Louise Lovely
- Distributed by: Universal Pictures
- Release date: December 17, 1915
- Running time: 2 reels (20 minutes)
- Country: United States
- Language: Silent with English intertitles

Stronger Than Death is a 1915 American silent drama film directed by Joe De Grasse, written by Bess Meredyth, and featuring Lon Chaney and Arthur Shirley. The film is notable for featuring two expatriate Australian actors together in the cast, Louise Lovely and Arthur Shirley. This was Louise Lovely's first American film - indeed it was the first time the actor, whose real name was Louise Carbasse, was credited as "Louise Lovely". The stage name was given to her by Carl Laemmle. Chaney had a relatively small role in this film as the attorney.

The film is now considered to be lost.

== Plot ==
June Lathrop, a pretty young orphan under the guardianship of Rupert Spaulding, meets John Henshaw, a young surgeon, and the two fall in love. June learns that Rupert Spaulding used to love her mother when she was a young girl, but he never proposed and so he lost her to another man. Now he is in love with June, and out of gratitude for raising her, she consents to marry him.

Spaulding dies shortly after their marriage, and on his death bed, he extracts a written promise from June that she will never get married again. Upon learning of Mr. Spaulding's death, Henshaw proposes marriage to June, but she tells him that she promised in writing that she would never marry again. Spaulding's spirit haunts June and she begins to sleepwalk. One night she falls off the balcony while walking in her sleep and suffers a serious brain injury. Henshaw, now a celebrated surgeon, is called to perform the delicate operation needed to save her life.

While under anesthesia, June's spirit meets the ghost of her dead husband, who tells her that he has witnessed her suffering and wishes to release her from her promise. Their spirits go down to the vault where her written promise is kept and together they burn the document. June later recovers from the operation and does not know whether or not it was all a dream. She orders the lawyer (Lon Chaney) to produce her dead husband's documents, and there on the top of his personal papers are the ashes of what once was her written agreement, burned to a cinder. June is now free to marry the man she really loves.

== Cast ==
- Louise Lovely as June Lathrop (credited as Louise Carbasse)
- Millard K. Wilson as Rupert Spaulding
- Arthur Shirley as John Henshaw, the surgeon
- Lon Chaney as Attorney

== Reception ==
"For this sort of story, which is not without a grewsome (sic) touch for certain observers, this is very well done." --- Moving Picture World

"This drama is based on a strong theme, but as produced with a great number of fantastical, visionary scenes, is rather confusing at times....Withal it will please, though the visionary scenes might possibly be made clearer." ---- Motion Picture News
