= Her Life's Story =

1914 film

- Directed by: Joe De Grasse
- Written by: James Dayton (screenplay); Miriam Bode Rasmus (poem)
- Produced by: Rex Film
- Starring: Pauline Bush; Lon Chaney
- Distributed by: Universal Pictures
- Release date: August 15, 1914
- Running time: 2 reels (20 minutes)
- Country: United States
- Language: Silent with English intertitles

Her Life's Story (aka Her Life Story in some references) is a 1914 American silent supernatural drama film directed by Joe De Grasse and featuring Lon Chaney and Pauline Bush. It was written by James Dayton, based on a poem called "The Cross" by Miriam Bade Rasmus. The film is now considered to be lost.

== Plot ==
Carlotta, born into a poor family, is adopted by the wealthy nobleman Don Velasquez. She grows up with her step-brother Don Manuel, and when they reach adulthood, they fall in love with each other. Don Velasquez doesn't approve of the union however. The son goes off to join the king's court for a time and when he returns six years later, he brings with him a wife and son. Carlotta develops an intense hatred for all of them, and later when she sees the young boy in a perilous situation, balancing on a window sill as he reaches out for a rose, she does nothing and allows the child to plummet to his death. Realizing the gravity of what she has done, Carlotta repents by entering a convent and becoming a nun. From the window of her cell, she arranges it so that she can see the child's gravestone, only magnifying her sense of guilt.

Thirteen years later, Carlotta confesses what she did to Sister Agnes, and tells her how every year on the anniversary of his death, the little boy's ghost appears before her, with a cross of blood on his forehead. When the anniversary arrives the next day, the ghost appears again and this time holds out his arms to her. She recognizes the ghost as the Christ child and realizes that God has forgiven her, because she confessed her sin to Sister Agnes the day before.

== Cast ==
- Pauline Bush as Carlotta
- Lon Chaney as Don Valesquez
- Ray Gallagher as Don Manuel
- Beatrice Van as The Wife
- Felix Walsh as The Child
- Laura Oakley as Sister Agnes
