= Her Bounty =

1914 film

- Directed by: Joe De Grasse
- Written by: Ida May Park
- Starring: Pauline Bush; Joe King; Lon Chaney
- Distributed by: Universal Pictures
- Release date: September 13, 1914
- Running time: 1 reel
- Country: United States
- Language: Silent with English intertitles

Her Bounty is a 1914 American silent drama film directed by Joe De Grasse and written by his wife Ida May Park, and featuring Lon Chaney and Pauline Bush. This was the first film Chaney worked on with the filmmaking team of Joe De Grasse and Ida May Park, to be followed by many more. The film is now considered to be lost.

== Plot ==
The horrific working conditions in her father's factory are brought to Ruth Braddon's attention by a letter she receives. Interested in social work, she asks her father to instruct his junior partner Fred Howard to show Ruth around the facilities. Howard is Ruth's fiancé. Ruth sees a young woman who has fainted from poor ventilation, and speaks to a young male employee who asks Fred Howard for better working conditions, but Howard simply orders the man to get back to work. Ruth tells Hale she will speak privately to her father about the situation. Unbeknownst to Ruth, Hale is trying to get himself a raise to enable him to marry a girl named Bessie Clay.

Later Ruth goes to visit Hale at his tenement building located in a squalid section of town. She falls in love with him, and breaks off her engagement to the cold-hearted Fred Howard. Ruth discovers a letter Hale has written to her father, asking him for a raise specifically so that he may marry Bessie Clay. Ruth had not known that Hale already had a fiancé. Not wanting to interfere with Bessie's happiness, Ruth breaks off her budding relationship with Hale, saying as an excuse that she cannot marry beneath her, while secretly she still loves the man.

== Cast ==
- Pauline Bush as Ruth Braddon
- Joe King as David Hale
- Lon Chaney as Fred Howard
- Beatrice Van as Bessie Clay
- William B. Robbins

== Reception ==
Motion Picture News wrote "A fine drama and a very appropriate Sunday release....Pauline Bush and Lon Chaney are the principals." Moving Picture World wrote "A sympathetic story of sacrifice, nicely presented."
