= A Mother's Atonement =

1915 film

- Directed by: Joe De Grasse
- Written by: Ida May Park
- Produced by: Rex Film Co.
- Starring: Lon Chaney; Cleo Madison
- Distributed by: Universal Pictures
- Release date: October 17, 1915
- Running time: 3 reels (approximately 30 minutes)
- Country: United States
- Language: Silent with English intertitles

A Mother's Atonement is a 1915 American silent drama film directed by Joe De Grasse, written by Ida May Park, and featuring Lon Chaney and Cleo Madison. Chaney played a dual role as Ben Morrison (both as an old man and his younger self). Two stills exist showing Lon Chaney in both of the roles he plays in the film.

A partially complete copy (reels one and two of three) are stored in the Library of Congress and are currently circulating on dvd. Roughly the last ten minutes of the film are lost however.

== Plot ==
Ben Morrison and his daughter Jen live on an island not far from the mainland. Jasper Crane, a crude middle-aged man, wants to marry Jen, and bargains with Ben to buy her. Ben relates the story of how his wife Alice deserted him many years ago, leaving him for a city slicker, John Newton.

Jen overhears her father bargaining to sell her to Mr. Crane, and she is horrified. Unwilling to marry him, Jen escapes through a trap door in the cottage's floor and swims across a wide expanse of water to the mainland where she is pulled out of the water by two business partners James Hilton and Wilbur Kent. Kent is engaged to marry James Hilton's sister, Dorothy. James takes an interest in Jen, but his mother Mrs. Hilton decides that Jen must go. Kent gives Jen some money for expenses and tells her to come see him if she ever needs anything.

Over the years, John Newton eventually tired of Alice, and she drifted in with a vulgar social set. Kent decides he needs a final bachelor's spree before his marriage to Dorothy and plans a raucous party on his yacht. John Newton is to be at the party, and Kent plans to surprise him by inviting Alice. Jen is unable to find work in the city and writes Kent for help. Her letter arrives at the height of the party, and Kent plans to add to the fun by bringing the girl to the party as well.

When she arrives, Alice recognizes Jen as her daughter, but does not tell anyone. Meanwhile, a financial problem arises and Hilton hurries to the party to discuss the situation with Kent. When he arrives, Hilton sees Alice, obviously very uncomfortable in the riotous surroundings. Newton, seeing how Alice is suffering, asks for her forgiveness, and begs her to lead a life worthy of her daughter. Hilton and Jen declare their love for each other, while Newton comforts Alice who is distraught with emotion.

== Cast ==
- Cleo Madison in a dual role as both Alice Morrison and Jen Morrison
- Lon Chaney in a dual role as Ben Morrison (both his older and younger selves)
- Arthur Shirley as James Hilton
- Wyndham Standing as Wilbur Kent
- Millard K. Wilson as John Newton
- Ben Rothwell as Jasper Crane
- Mildred Manning as Dorothy Hilton

== Reception ==
"This is not a picture for the unsophisticated as it makes no pretense of hiding its true colors. The first scenes, photographed in the environs of a lake, are ideal, being well chosen and excellently filmed." --- Motion Picture News
