= The Oyster Dredger =

1915 film

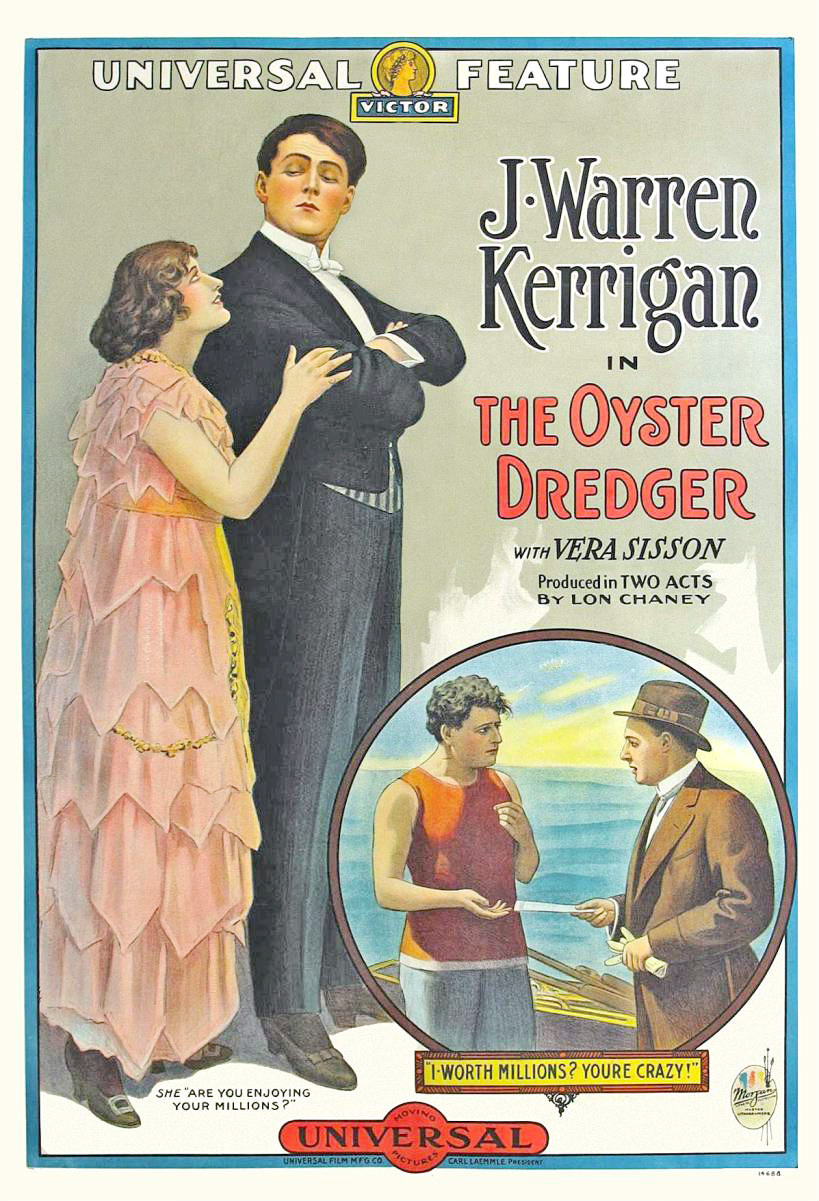
- Film poster
- Directed by: Lon Chaney
- Written by: Lon Chaney
- Starring: Vera Sisson; J. Warren Kerrigan
- Distributed by: Universal Pictures
- Release date: June 14, 1915
- Running time: 2 reels (20 minutes)
- Country: United States
- Language: Silent with English intertitles

The Oyster Dredger is a 1915 American silent drama film written and directed by Lon Chaney, and starring J. Warren Kerrigan and Vera Sisson. Chaney did not appear in the film himself. Chaney only directed two films that he himself wrote, The Oyster Dredger and The Chimney's Secret, both 1915.

The film is now considered to be lost. The film was marketed in the USA with one-sheet, three-sheet and six-sheet posters. The film was released in Canada on June 21, 1915.

== Plot ==
On a trip to the seashore, a wealthy heiress named Vera is intrigued by Jack, an oyster dredger whom she sees at the beach. She instructs the driver of her boat to bump the other craft as a joke, which causes the oyster dredger to tumble into the sea. Later the two become good friends. She convinces Jack to trade places with her, desiring to adopt his more primitive lifestyle. Jack agrees to the proposition and moves into the girl's beautiful mansion, while she goes off to work at his job. Vera instructs her lawyer to alter her personal property records to reflect that Jack is the owner of Vera's estate.

When Vera tires of the exhausting job, she tells her lawyer to switch all the records back, but the lawyer pretends not to understand what she is talking about. He tells her that she must marry him or he will remain silent and not restore her estate and property to her. Vera is indignant at the lawyer's proposal.

The lawyer tells Jack that since Vera has rejected his amorous advances, he is going to allow Jack to keep Vera's property indefinitely, but Jack grows weary of the "easy life" and wants to go back to his job as an oyster dredger. In a saloon, Jack overhears the lawyer making insulting remarks about Vera, and just as he is about to beat him up, the lawyer steps backward and falls into the sea and drowns. In the end, Jack and Vera are reunited and get married.

== Cast ==
- J. Warren Kerrigan as Jack
- Vera Sisson as Vera
- William Quinn as The Lawyer

== Reception ==
"Rather impossible, yet the presence of Jack Kerrigan and Vera Sisson in the principal roles serves to life it from the ordinary. There are many bits of comedy throughout the two reels which make the film doubly enjoyable. The scenes and photography are good." ---Motion Picture News

"A two-reel comedy drama written by Lon Chaney. The plot is not to be taken very seriously; it is made entertaining largely through interest in the principal performers. Otherwise it is not very strong." ---Moving Picture World

"This two-part drama...is a good, interesting picture, well acted and ably directed." --- New York Dramatic Mirror
