= The Trap (1913 film) =

1913 film

- Directed by: Edwin August
- Produced by: Pat Powers
- Starring: Murdock MacQuarrie; Pauline Bush; Lon Chaney
- Distributed by: Universal Film Manufacturing Company
- Release date: October 3, 1913
- Running time: 1 reel
- Country: United States
- Languages: Silent; English intertitles

The Trap is a 1913 American silent short drama film directed by Edwin August, produced by Pat Powers, and starring Murdock MacQuarrie, Pauline Bush and Lon Chaney. The film is now considered lost. Chaney would later appear in an unrelated film of the same name in 1922.

== Plot ==
A jealous girl, Jane, puts paint on her fiancé Lon's overcoat and becomes excited when she finds traces of the paint on another girl's waist. But it develops that Lon's brother Chance had worn the coat in the meantime, and she is pacified after an explanation. But later, Chance's wife Cleo finds traces of the paint on Jane's dress and accuses Chance of being unfaithful to her. All is explained in the end.

== Cast ==
- Lon Chaney as Lon
- Murdock MacQuarrie as Chance (Lon's brother)
- Pauline Bush as Jane (Lon's fiancé)
- Cleo Madison as Cleo (Chance's wife)
