= The Fascination of the Fleur de Lis =

1915 film

- Directed by: Joe De Grasse
- Written by: Bess Meredyth
- Produced by: Rex Film Co.
- Starring: Lon Chaney; Cleo Madison
- Distributed by: Universal Pictures
- Release date: September 26, 1915
- Running time: 3 reels (30 minutes)
- Country: United States
- Language: Silent with English intertitles

The Fascination of the Fleur de Lis is a 1915 American silent drama film directed by Joe De Grasse, written by Bess Meredyth, and featuring Lon Chaney and Cleo Madison. A partial print of the film apparently survives in a private collection in the United Kingdom (how much footage is missing is unknown).

A still exists showing Chaney in his own makeup as the Duke of Safoulrug, an excellent example of Chaney's makeup skills.

== Plot ==
A woman is taken ill while working in the fields, and while taking her home, her husband passes the palace of the Duke of Safoulrug. There, the sickly woman sees a fleur de lis, and is fascinated with the unusual flower. When she later gives birth to a baby girl, the infant has a birthmark shaped like a fleur de lis on her shoulder. The mother dies, and fifteen years later, her daughter Lisette has also acquired her mother's strange obsession for the flower.

One day while passing the Duke's palace, she demands that her sweetheart Antoine pick one of the flowers for her, but the gardener chases them away. Lisette manages to steal a flower, and is seen by the Duke of Safoulrug who is captivated by her beauty. Lisette deserts Antoine and marries the Duke instead for his money, despite the fact that she does not love him. During a royal reception, she meets the King, who is bewitched by her beauty and takes her in his arms. The Duke, knowing that he dare not confront a King, commits suicide, whereupon the King takes Lisette on as his mistress.

His Majesty is taken ill one day, and the doctor who arrives to treat him is Antoine, her old flame, now a famous surgeon. Antoine goes to Lisette's room to tell her the operation was a success and she throws her arms around him. He rebukes her advances, saying the fleur de lis has come between them and their happiness. Lisette goes to the fireplace, grabs a hot poker, and burns the birthmark from her flesh. Months later, Lisette is caring for her old father in his hut. She brings some flowers to her mother's grave, and it is there that Antoine finds her and takes her in his arms.

== Cast ==
- Cleo Madison as Lisette
- Arthur Shirley as Antoine Gerome
- Lon Chaney as the Duke of Safoulrug
- Millard K. Wilson as The King

== Reception ==
"The photographic work and scenes, all of which transpire in a mythical European country, are extremely good. Joe De Grasse produced it so the beautiful locations are easily accounted for." --- Motion Picture News
