= The Old Cobbler =

1914 film

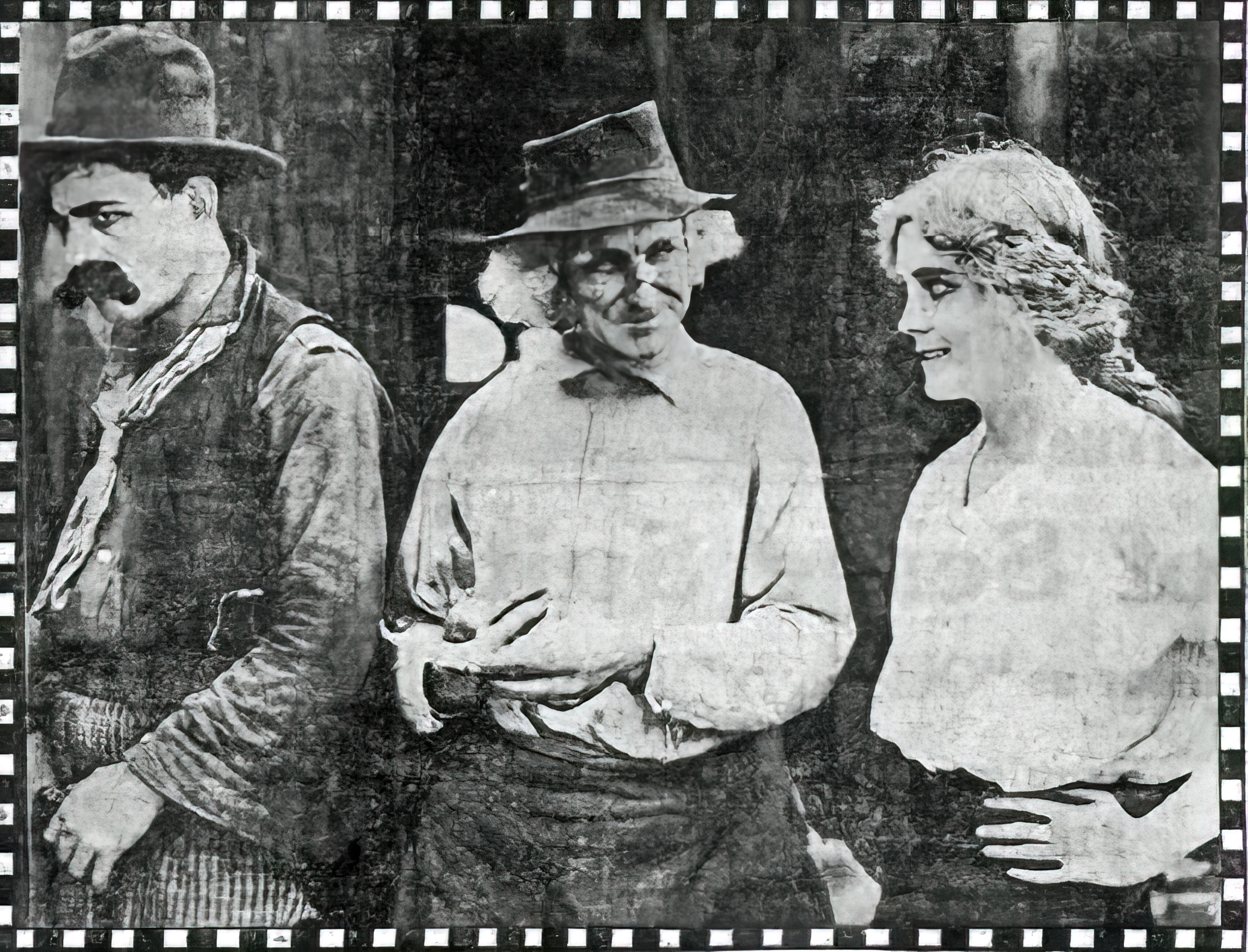
- Directed by: Murdock MacQuarrie
- Written by: Seymour Hastings
- Starring: Murdock MacQuarrie; Richard Rosson; Lon Chaney; Agnes Vernon
- Distributed by: Universal Pictures
- Release date: June 27, 1914
- Running time: 20 minutes
- Country: United States
- Language: Silent with English intertitles

The Old Cobbler is a 1914 American silent drama film directed by Murdock MacQuarrie. The film features Murdock MacQuarrie, Richard Rosson, Agnes Vernon and Lon Chaney. The Old Cobbler was MacQuarrie's debut film as a director. The film is now considered to be lost.

== Plot ==
A scene from The Old Cobbler

Nathan, an old cobbler, catches his son, Dick, stealing money from his wallet. He throws the boy out, hoping that tough love will shape the boy up. His alcoholic wife is all he has left, but when he goes upstairs, he finds her dead. Nathan heads West and settles down in a mining camp where he develops a reputation for being kind and charitable. One day, Wild Bill, a gunslinger, comes to Nathan to have a boot repaired and treats him rudely. Nathan throws the man out of his shop, and Wild Bill comes to respect the old man's courage. The two men develop a friendship.

Bill's sweetheart, Jess, is a dance hall girl and when she has a slipper repaired by Nathan, he returns it to her with a note inside. The note touches her so deeply that she gives up her dance hall life. One day Bill captures a highwayman who robbed a stage and recognizes the boy as Nathan's son Dick from a photograph Nathan had shown him. He leaves the boy in Nathan's custody and returns the stolen money, reporting that the robbers got away.

== Cast ==
- Murdock MacQuarrie as The Cobbler
- Richard Rosson as The Cobbler's Son
- May Benson as The Cobbler's Wife
- Lon Chaney as "Wild Bill"
- Agnes Vernon as Jess, The Dance Hall Girl

== Reception ==
Moving Picture World wrote: "Mr. MacQuarrie shines greatest in a character role, and here is one that could not have been improved upon if it had been written especially for him. The supporting cast, with Lon Chaney and Mr. Rosson at the head, gives a telling account of itself. The settings, for the most part, are Western, picturesque and beautifully photographed."
