= For Cash =

1915 film

- Directed by: Lon Chaney
- Written by: W. M. Caldwell
- Starring: J. Warren Kerrigan; Vera Sisson
- Distributed by: Universal Pictures
- Release date: 3 May 1915
- Running time: 2 reels (20 minutes)
- Country: United States
- Language: Silent with English intertitles

For Cash is a 1915 American silent drama short film directed by Lon Chaney and released by Universal Pictures, starring J. Warren Kerrigan and Vera Sisson. Chaney directed this film but not appear in it. The film is today considered to be lost. (*Note - Historian Jon C. Mirsalis has claimed that Lon Chaney appeared in the film as Vera's father, but the Blake book on Chaney states that Chaney only directed the film and did not act in it.)

== Plot ==
Vera Ronceval has been raised in seclusion by her reclusive father Amos Ronceval. One day she meets Arthen Owen, a young artist, and they fall in love. When Amos learns of their romance, he forbids Arthen to see his daughter, and in his excitement, suffers a heart attack. His last dying wish is that Vera be placed in the custody of her wealthy cousin, Mr. Ronceval, who is an attorney. He takes Vera away to his home in the big city, and Arthen, unable to contact his beloved Vera, falls into dissapation.

Bankrupt, Arthen agrees to paint pictures for Lee Varick, a disreputable "artist" who makes a living by putting his signature on other artists' work. Mr. Ronceval is friendly with Varick, and decides that Varick would be a suitable husband for Vera; she reluctantly consents to the engagement. Vera sees Arthen one day, and despite the disgraceful state to which he has fallen, tells him that she still loves him.

Arthen, now with a newfound reason to live, goes to Varick to return the latest check which he received from the fraud, when he suddenly hears screams from the man's apartment. He breaks in to find Vera, who went there to break off her engagement, being physically assaulted by Varick. Arthen knocks Varick down and rescues Vera. When her cousin learns of Varick's vile behavior, he decides to allow Vera to marry Arthen.

== Cast ==
- J. Warren Kerrigan as Arthen Owen
- Vera Sisson as Vera Ronceval
- J. Edwin Brown as Amos Ronceval, Vera's father (as Mr. Brown)
- William Quinn as Lee Varick, an artist
- Walter Bytell as Mr. Ronceval, Vera's cousin

== Reception ==
"This is very conventional and not particularly attractive in settings. The principals are interesting, but their work furnishes the chief strength of the production." ---Moving Picture World

"Lon Chaney directed this while Warren Kerrigan and Vera Sisson are the principals. The two reels have been photographed well and some pretty scenes have been obtained. The story becomes more vague as the action progresses and the main idea is hard to grasp." --- Motion Picture News)
