= The Violin Maker =

1915 film

- Directed by: Lon Chaney
- Written by: Milton Moore
- Starring: Lon Chaney; Gretchen Lederer
- Distributed by: Universal Pictures
- Release date: July 9, 1915
- Running time: 1 reel (10 minutes)
- Country: United States
- Language: Silent with English intertitles

The Violin Maker is a 1915 American short silent drama film directed by Lon Chaney, written by Milton M. Moore and starring Lon Chaney and Gretchen Lederer. The film is now considered to be lost. A still exists showing Chaney as "Pedro" smashing the violin (see Plot).

== Plot ==
Pedro is a violin maker who is deeply in love with his talented ward, Marguerita. One day, while she is playing the violin, director Maurice Puello hears the girl play and persuades her to give a recital at his theater. Her first appearance is a great success, and Pedro applauds her from the audience, not realizing she is falling in love with Maurice. Pedro decides to make a special violin for the girl. He finishes the violin, the finest instrument he has ever made, and brings it over to the theater. Waiting by the stage door, he sees Marguerita and Maurice walking out arm in arm. Blinded with jealousy, Pedro disguises himself as a blind beggar in order to spy on Marguerita.

One night as Pedro is playing the violin on the street corner disguised as the beggar, Maurice and Marguerita are attracted by the beautiful music. Marguerita offers to buy the violin, but Pedro tells her that he cannot sell it because he made it especially for an old sweetheart. She sees an inscription on the back of the violin that says "To my Marguerita" and Pedro suddenly reveals his identity in anger and spitefully smashes the violin over his knee.

One night, Pedro wanders into a cafe where Marguerita is playing a violin. He has a waiter bring her a coin with a request for another tune. When the waiter points Pedro out to her as the man who made the request, Marguerita is touched and plays a beautiful melody for Pedro. She goes over to his table and asks for his forgiveness. He is about to ignore her when he notices that she has repaired the violin that he smashed. He is moved by the girl's devotion to him and the two are happily reunited.

== Cast ==
- Lon Chaney as Pedro
- Gretchen Lederer as Marguerita
- William Quinn as Maurice Puello

== Reception ==
"A strong character portrayal is here rendered by Lon Chaney in the role of an Italian violin maker. The story is original in many ways, and pleases all the time by its strong heart interest action." --- Motion Picture News
