= The Chimney's Secret =

1915 film

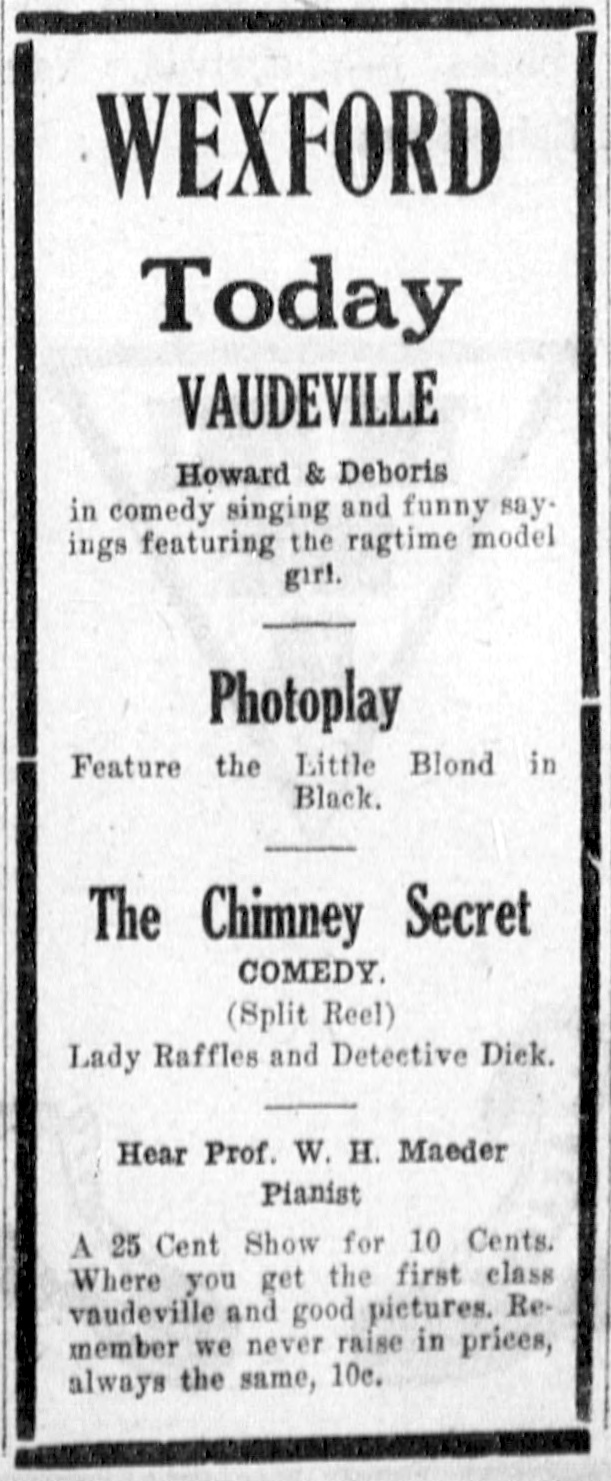
- Contemporary newspaper advertisement.
- Directed by: Lon Chaney
- Written by: Lon Chaney (screenplay); Milton Moore (story)
- Produced by: Victor Films
- Starring: Lon Chaney; Gretchen Lederer
- Distributed by: Universal Pictures
- Release date: August 25, 1915
- Running time: 1 reel (10 minutes)
- Country: United States
- Language: Silent with English intertitles

The Chimney's Secret is a 1915 American silent drama film written and directed by, and starring, Lon Chaney. Chaney's screenplay was based on a story by Milton Moore. The film is now considered to be in the public domain and a lost film.

Chaney played a dual role in this film, that of George Harding (the bank cashier) and of the old peddler (George Harding in disguise). Lon wrote to his brother George Chaney at the time how proud he was of this film (since he wrote it, directed it and played two parts in it using his extensive knowledge of makeup) and sent him three stills from it. A site exists that shows photos of Chaney in makeup for the dual roles he played in the film.

== Plot ==
An old peddler hides money in a hidden compartment in his chimney. His neighbor Mary Ellis is taking care of her invalid sister. Mary defends the old peddler from some boys throwing stones at him. Mary has been saving her money in a bank account, planning to raise enough cash to move to a better climate with her sickly sister.

Charles Harding, a cashier at the bank, steals the bank's money, causing the bank to fail. The townspeople know that Harding has absconded with their money, but they can't seem to find a trace of him anywhere. When Mary hears the bank has no money, she pounds on the bank's doors in a vain attempt to withdraw her cash. The old peddler sees Mary pounding on the bank door and he hurries home to retrieve the money that he has hidden in his chimney so that he can leave town with the cash.

Mary appears at the beggar's house and in a fit of insanity, he throws the money on the table in front of her and tells her that it was he who robbed the bank. He rips off a fake beard and wig, and reveals to her that he is actually Charles Harding, the bank cashier. Mary begs him to give the money back to the poor townspeople. He gives her the money, but as she leaves, he has second thoughts and runs wildly after her as if to get it back. Suddenly he sees Mary hovering above him in a vision, and he stumbles back to his chimney and dies from a seizure.

== Cast ==
- Lon Chaney in a dual role as Charles Harding and as the old beggar
- Gretchen Lederer as Mary Ellis
- Katherine Campbell as Mary's invalid sister (uncredited)
- Vera Sisson (uncredited)

== Reception ==
"This is novel and well played by Lon Chaney as the cashier, and Gretchen Lederer as the girl." --- Motion Picture News

"This story of the young bank cashier who masquerades as a miserly peddler is not entirely new, but will offer surprise to many observers. It is quite dramatic in its way and well constructed. Lon Chaney and Gretchen Lederer play the leads. --- Moving Picture World
