= List of lost silent films (1910–1914) =

This is a list of lost silent films that were released from 1910 to 1914.

Year	Film	Director	Cast	Notes	Ref
1910	Il Trovatore	Louis J. Gasnier, Ugo Falena	Francesca Bertini, Gemma Farina, Alberto Vestri	An adaptation, by Film d'Arte Italiana, of the Gutiérrez play, with a special music score adapted from Verdi	
1910	Jean and the Calico Doll	Laurence Trimble	Jean	Film debut of Helen Hayes	
1911	Back to the Soil	Thomas H. Ince	King Baggot, Mary Pickford, Owen Moore	A drama short	
1911	The Better Way	?	King Baggot, Mary Pickford, Owen Moore	A drama short	
1911	Billy the Kid	Laurence Trimble	Tefft Johnson, Edith Storey	A one-reel western short	
1911	The Fisher-Maid	Thomas H. Ince	Mary Pickford, Owen Moore	A short	
1911	For Her Brother's Sake	Thomas H. Ince	Mary Pickford, Owen Moore, Jack Pickford, Thomas H. Ince	A one-reel short	
1911	For the Queen's Honor	Thomas H. Ince	Mary Pickford, Owen Moore, King Baggot, George Loane Tucker, Isabel Rea	A short	
1911	Her Darkest Hour		Mary Pickford	A short	
1911	His Dress Shirt		Mary Pickford	A short	
1911	The Immortal Alamo	William F. Haddock	Francis Ford	Earliest film of the Battle of the Alamo, shot at the Alamo itself	
1911	Love Heeds Not the Showers	Owen Moore	Mary Pickford, Owen Moore	A one-reel short	
1911	Only a Factory Girl			Australian drama	
1911	The Rose's Story		Mary Pickford	A short	
1911	Science		Mary Pickford, King Baggot	A short	
1911	Second Sight		Mary Pickford	A short	
1911	The Sentinel Asleep		Mary Pickford	A short	
1911	The Toss of a Coin	Thomas H. Ince	Mary Pickford, Irvin Willat, Ethel Grandin, Lottie Pickford	A one-reel short	
1912	The Honor of the Family		Lon Chaney	Thought by some to be Chaney's on-screen debut, though this is disputed	
1912	Honor Thy Father		Mary Pickford, Owen Moore	A one-reel short	
1912	Saved from the Titanic	Étienne Arnaud	Dorothy Gibson	First film about the sinking of the RMS Titanic, released just 29 days after the disaster. Gibson was an actual Titanic survivor.	
1913	Adrienne Lecouvreur	Louis Mercanton; Henri Desfontaines	Sarah Bernhardt	A two-reeler	
1913	Almost an Actress	Allen Curtis	Louise Fazenda		
1913	Back to Life	Allan Dwan	Pauline Bush, J. Warren Kerrigan, William Worthington	A 20-minute short, with Lon Chaney	
1913	The Battle of Gettysburg	Charles Giblyn, Thomas H. Ince	Willard Mack, Charles K. French	The film was reported to have been screened in France in 1973. Mack Sennett arranged to shoot Cohen Saves the Flag alongside the production of Gettysburg, surreptitiously capturing Ince's battle sequences in his film at no cost to himself. This indirect footage survives.	
1913	Bloodhounds of the North	Allan Dwan	Murdock MacQuarrie, Pauline Bush, William Lloyd	A 20-minute short, with Lon Chaney	
1913	Baldknobber	Bill Harrington	Unknown actors	A feature film made in the Ozarks just 23 years after the hanging of the Bald knobbers	
1913	Caprice	J. Searle Dawley	Mary Pickford, Owen Moore		
1913	The Crisis	W. J. Lincoln	Roy Redgrave, Godfrey Cass	An Australian melodrama	
1913	An Elephant on His Hands	Al Christie	Eddie Lyons, Lee Moran, Ramona Langley	A one-reel short	
1913	In the Bishop's Carriage	Edwin S. Porter, J. Searle Dawley	Mary Pickford		
1913	Lady Babbie	Oscar A. C. Lund	Barbara Tennant, Oscar A. C. Lund	This three-reel featurette was filmed at Eclair American's studio in Fort Lee, New Jersey and on location at Lake George, New York.	
1913	Macbeth	Arthur Bourchier	Arthur Bourchier, Violet Vanbrugh	The International Museum of Photography and Film at George Eastman House may have a print.	
1913	Maria Marten, or the Mystery of the Red Barn	Maurice Elvey	Nessie Blackford, Maurice Elvey	On the BFI 75 Most Wanted list	
1913	A promotional Kinemacolor film of The New Henrietta		Douglas Fairbanks	The New Henrietta was a then-current stage adaptation of the very successful 19th century play The Henrietta which had starred William Henry Crane. The footage was not of the play, but instead depicted the cast relaxing "in their social hours." It was the first screen appearance of future movie star Douglas Fairbanks.	
1913	Red Margaret, Moonshiner	Allan Dwan	Pauline Bush, Murdock MacQuarrie	A two-reel short	
1913	The Restless Spirit	Allan Dwan	J. Warren Kerrigan, Pauline Bush		
1913	The Sea Urchin	Edwin August	Jeanie Macpherson, Lon Chaney		
1913	Shon the Piper	Otis Turner	Robert Z. Leonard, Joseph Singleton, Lon Chaney		
1913	The Trap	Edwin August	Murdock MacQuarrie, Pauline Bush, Cleo Madison, Lon Chaney	A one-reel short	
1913	The Werewolf	Henry MacRae	Clarence Burton, Marie Walcamp	The first werewolf film; it was destroyed in a Universal fire in 1924 on the East Coast.	
1914	Andrew Carnegie		Andrew Carnegie as himself	Recording of Carnegie reading The Gospel of Wealth. The Kinetophone sound cylinder remains.	
1914	The Birth of the Telephone	Allen Ramsey?	Thomas A. Watson as himself	Watson was the person who received the first telephone call, from Alexander Graham Bell. The Kinetophone sound cylinder remains.	
1914	A Celebrated Case	George Melford?	Alice Joyce, Guy Coombs, Marguerite Courtot		
1914	The Crucible	Edwin Stanton Porter, Hugh Ford	Marguerite Clark	Clark's second feature, based on the play by Mark Lee Luther. Re-released in 1919	
1914	Damaged Goods	Thomas Ricketts	Richard Bennett	Bennett starred in the 1913 Broadway play Damaged Goods with Wilton Lackaye.	
1914	Darktown Jubilee	Bert Williams (likely)	Bert Williams	An "all-Negro" film starring comedian Williams, the lone black star of the Ziegfeld Follies and America's top recording artist. The distributor, Biograph, pulled the film from circulation after white audiences responded poorly to Williams' wily, independent characterization.	
1914	The Escape	D. W. Griffith	Donald Crisp	The master negatives for this feature on the subject of venereal disease were destroyed on June 13, 1914 in a disastrous fire at the Lubin Manufacturing Company in Philadelphia.	
1914	Evangeline	Edward P. Sullivan, William Cavanaugh	Laura Lyman, John F. Carleton	The first Canadian feature-length movie	
1914	Fighting Death	Herbert Blaché	Rodman Law	A thrill film starring early motion picture stuntman Rodman Law. Filmed in New York and New Jersey	
1914	The Ghost Breaker	Cecil B. DeMille, Oscar C. Apfel	H. B. Warner	Based on the 1909 Broadway play of the same name by Paul Dickey and Charles W. Goddard.	
1914	Hearts Adrift	Edwin Stanton Porter	Mary Pickford	A film similar in theme to Henry De Vere Stacpoole's The Blue Lagoon	
1914	Her Friend the Bandit	Charlie Chaplin	Charlie Chaplin, Mabel Normand	The only lost film starring Chaplin. Rumors that it had been found in Argentina proved to be untrue.	
1914	The Higher Law	Charles Giblyn	Murdock MacQuarrie, Pauline Bush		
1914	The Hopes of Blind Alley	Allan Dwan	Murdock MacQuarrie, Pauline Bush, George Cooper		
1914	In the Clutches of the Gang	George Nichols, Mack Sennett	Fatty Arbuckle		
1914	The Jungle	George Irving, John H. Pratt	George Nash, Gail Kane	The only film version to date of Upton Sinclair's book of the same name	
1914	The Life of General Villa	Christy Cabanne	Pancho Villa	A film about Mexican revolutionary Pancho Villa, starring Villa as himself	
1914	The Man Who Disappeared	Charles Brabin	Marc McDermott, Herbert Yost	A ten-part serial	
1914	The Million Dollar Mystery	Howell Hansel		A serial in 23 parts	
1914	A Night of Thrills	Joe De Grasse	Lon Chaney, Pauline Bush		
1914	The Old Cobbler	Murdock MacQuarrie	Murdock MacQuarrie, Richard Rosson, Agnes Vernon	This two-reel short was MacQuarrie's directorial debut.	
1914	The Siege and Fall of the Alamo	Ray Myers		Four production stills and a review are held at the Library of Congress.	
1914	Sperduti nel buio	Nino Martoglio	Giovanni Grasso, Virginia Balistrieri	The only known copy of this movie was stolen in Rome by German soldiers during the Second World War, and then presumably lost. No other copy has been found since then.	
1914	A Study in Scarlet	George Pearson	James Bragington	The first feature-length adaptation of a Sherlock Holmes story, it is on the BFI 75 Most Wanted list of missing films.	
1914	Such a Little Queen	Edwin S. Porter, Hugh Ford	Mary Pickford	Based on a play by Channing Pollock	
1914	The Trey o' Hearts	Wilfred Lucas, Henry MacRae	Cleo Madison, George Larkin	A serial with 15 episodes	
