= The Mask of Love =

1917 film

- Directed by: Joe De Grasse
- Written by: Unknown
- Produced by: Carl Laemmle
- Starring: Lon Chaney; Pauline Bush
- Distributed by: Universal Film Manufacturing Company
- Release date: March 29, 1917
- Running time: 1 reel (10 minutes)
- Country: United States
- Languages: Silent; English intertitles

The Mask of Love is a 1914 American short silent crime film (released in 1917), directed by Joe De Grasse and starring Lon Chaney and Pauline Bush. The film is considered lost.

Chaney biographer Jon C. Mirsalis states: "As is the case for Accusing Evidence (1916), it is highly unlikely that (The Mask of Love) was shot in 1917. It may be a reissue of an earlier film when Bush and Chaney were working together, although no other film's synopsis matches this very closely. It could also have been assembled from footage leftover from The Menace to Carlotta (1914), or it may have just been shot previously circa 1914 and never released." Pauline Bush was no longer working at Universal in 1917.

== Plot ==
Carlotta and her elderly father live in poverty, and are befriended by Marino, a tough criminal. Marino pretends to want to help them, but he attempts to rape Carlotta. Peter, an old friend of Carlotta's, happens along in time to rescue her. Carlotta's father learns of Marino's attempted rape of his daughter and swears revenge. He confronts Marino and they fight. Marino is just about to stab Carlotta's father when he receives a beating from Peter. Carlotta and Peter are married and make plans for a happy life together.

== Cast ==
- Lon Chaney as Marino
- Pauline Bush as Carlotta
