= The Embezzler =

The Embezzler or variant may refer to:

- embezzler, a person who embezzles or engages in embezzlement
- The Embezzler (1914 film), an American silent short drama film
- The Embezzler (1954 film), a British crime film
- The Embezzler (1966 book), a book by Louis Auchincloss
- The Embezzler (1944 novel), a novel by James M. Cain
- The Embezzlers (1926 novel), a novel by Valentin Kataev
- "The Embezzler", a character from the 1913 film Bloodhounds of the North
