= The Forbidden Room =

The Forbidden Room can refer to:

- The Forbidden Room (1914 film), a silent film directed by Allan Dwan
- The Forbidden Room (1977 film), a mystery film directed by Dino Risi
- The Forbidden Room (2015 film), a Canadian film directed by Guy Maddin
