= Steady Company =

Steady Company may refer to:

- Steady Company (1915 film), a silent drama film
- Steady Company (1932 film), an American action film
