= Girl of the Night (disambiguation) =

The title Girl of the Night may refer to one of the following films:

- The Girl of the Night, a 1915 American silent film
- Girl of the Night, a 1960 American film
- Girls of the Night (1958 film), a French–Italian–West German film
- Girls of the Night (1961 film), a Japanese film

== See also ==
- Night Girl, a fictional character in media published by DC Comics
