= West of Rainbow's End =

1938 film directed by Alan James

- Theatrical release poster
- Directed by: Alan James
- Screenplay by: Stanley Roberts; Gennaro Rea
- Story by: Robert Emmett Tansey
- Produced by: Maurice Conn
- Starring: Tim McCoy; Kathleen Eliot; Walter McGrail; George Cooper; Mary Carr; Bob Kortman
- Cinematography: Jack Greenhalgh
- Edited by: George Martin
- Production companies: Concord Productions, Inc.
- Distributed by: Monogram Pictures
- Release date: January 12, 1938
- Running time: 57 minutes
- Country: United States
- Language: English

West of Rainbow's End is a 1938 American Western film directed by Alan James and written by Stanley Roberts and Gennaro Rea. The film stars Tim McCoy, Kathleen Eliot, Walter McGrail, George Cooper, Mary Carr and Bob Kortman. The film was released on January 12, 1938, by Monogram Pictures.

== Cast ==
- Tim McCoy as Tim Hart
- Kathleen Eliot as Joan Carter
- Walter McGrail as George Reynolds / Johnson
- George Cooper as Happy
- Mary Carr as Mrs. Martha Carter
- Bob Kortman as Speck
- Hank Bell as Joe
- Frank LaRue as Lightning Ed
- Reed Howes as Ted Crane
- Edward Coxen as Joel Carter
- Jimmy Aubrey as Postmaster Jed
- George Chang as Elmer the Cook
