= The Menace to Carlotta =

1914 film

- Directed by: Allan Dwan
- Written by: Lon Chaney
- Starring: Pauline Bush; William C. Dowlan; Lon Chaney; Murdock MacQuarrie
- Distributed by: Universal Film Manufacturing Company
- Release date: February 22, 1914
- Running time: 20 minutes
- Country: United States
- Languages: Silent; English intertitles

The Menace to Carlotta is a 1914 American silent short drama film directed by Allan Dwan, featuring Pauline Bush, William C. Dowlan, Murdock MacQuarrie and Lon Chaney. On March 19, 1914, it was banned by the censor of Quebec. Currently, the film is now considered lost. Notably, Chaney wrote the film's scenario marking his first known screenwriting credit. Initially, the film was titled Carlotta, the Bead Stringer.

== Plot ==
Carlotta's fiancé Giovanni Bartholdi becomes destitute after losing his money to a shady character known as "The Vulture" in a gambling game. He moves in with Carlotta and her family, including her father and brother Tony. The Vulture convinces Giovanni to lure Carlotta to a seedy dive one night, where she is to be kidnapped and sold into the white slave trade. However, her family intervenes just in time and she is rescued by her father and brother.

== Cast ==
- Lon Chaney as Giovanni Bartholdi
- Pauline Bush as Carlotta
- William C. Dowlan as Carlotta's brother, Tony
- Murdock MacQuarrie as Carlotta's father
- John Burton as The Vulture

== Reception ==
"Motion Picture News" praised the film noting that "The fight between Giovanni and the old father is very realistic, almost too much so." Meanwhile "Moving Picture World" wrote a review that read: "A one-reel (sic) offering by Lou (sic) Chaney, who plays the villain's part...The Italian characterizations are good and the setting's in keeping...The photography is fair." (Note that the reviewer incorrectly referred to the film as a "one-reel offering", while reference sources list it as two reels in length. The same reviewer however also misspelled Chaney's first name).
