= The Pipes o' Pan =

1914 film

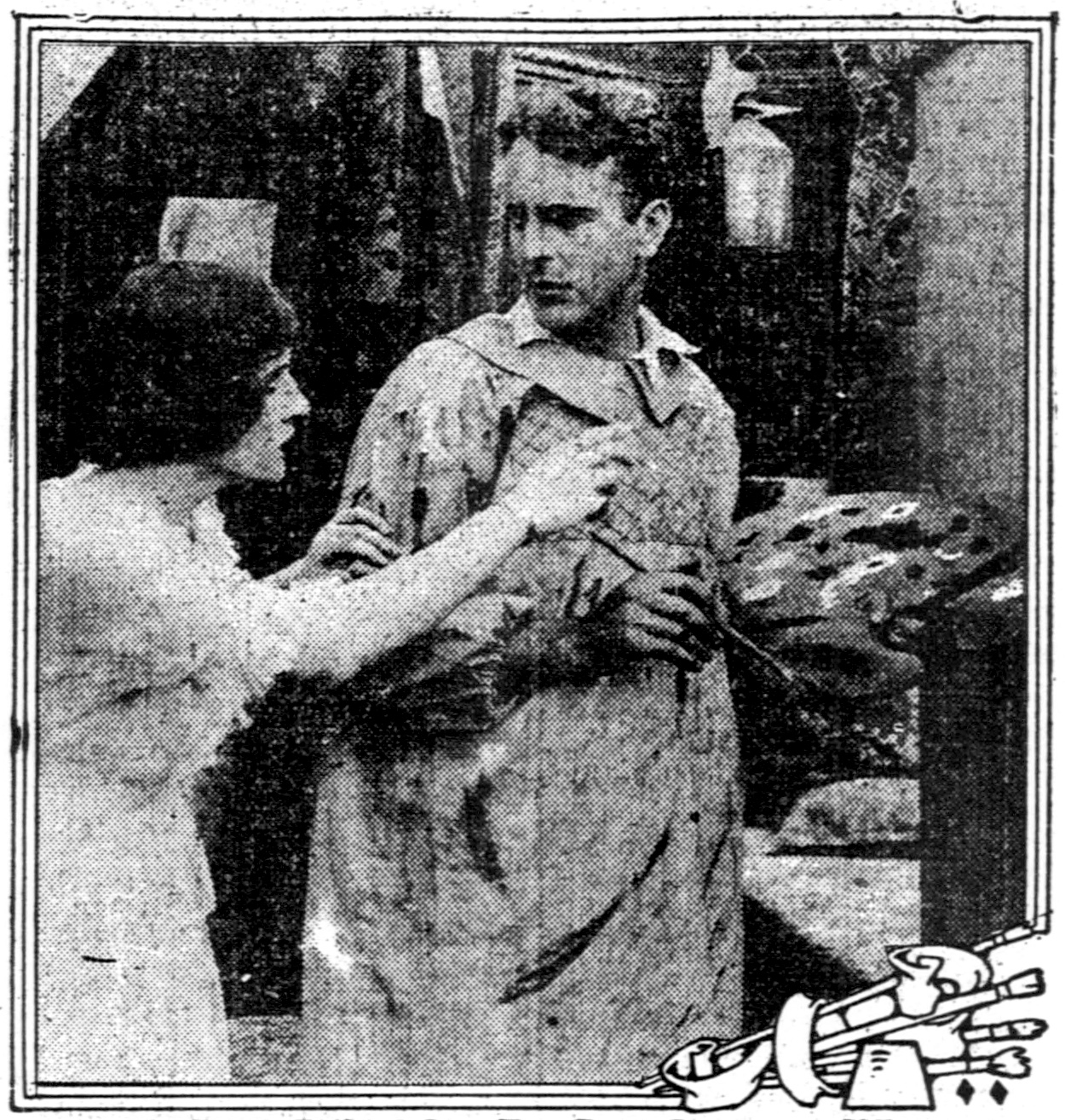
- Film still of Pauline Bush with Joe King
- Directed by: Joe De Grasse
- Starring: Pauline Bush; Joe King; Lon Chaney
- Distributed by: Universal Pictures
- Release date: October 4, 1914
- Running time: 2 reels
- Country: United States
- Language: Silent with English intertitles

The Pipes o' Pan (aka The Pipes of Pan) is a 1914 American silent drama film directed by Joe De Grasse and featuring Lon Chaney and Pauline Bush. It is thought the screenplay was written by De Grasse's wife Ida May Park, but she was uncredited. The film is now considered to be lost.

The sequence in the film showing the history of Pan was hand colored, with the rest of the film in black-and-white. A still exists showing Lon Chaney in the Arthur Farrell role.

== Plot ==
Stephen Arnold, a painter, dreams of a beautiful love scene in a forest involving a faun and a wood-nymph that is interrupted by the daughter of Pan. In the dream, Pan's daughter lures the faun away from his beloved wood-nymph with her magic flute. When he awakens from his dream, he decides to capture the image of Pan's daughter on canvas and goes in search of a suitable model. He meets Caprice, a dancer who strangely resembles Pan's daughter as seen in his dream. Stephen convinces the girl to pose for him and he soon becomes entranced by her. His wife Marian becomes jealous at her husband's neglect of her and she strikes up a relationship with Arthur Farrell, her husband's best friend. Farrell falls in love with Marian and makes advances towards her, but she keeps him at arm's length.

After the painting is finished, Stephen is unable to give Caprice up and he is drawn into a passionate love scene with the young woman. Totally disgusted at her husband's behavior, Marian has decided to leave him at this point and run off with Farrell, and she goes to her husband's studio to tell him. There she finds the completed painting of Caprice, and in a rage, she slashes it to tatters. With the painting destroyed, Caprice's strange hold over Stephen is suddenly broken. The repentant artist returns home to his forgiving wife and they are reunited.

== Cast ==
- Joe King as Stephen Arnold, the artist
- Pauline Bush as Marian, his wife
- Carmen Phillips as Caprice, the mysterious model
- Lon Chaney as Arthur Farrell

== Reception ==
Moving Picture World wrote: "The model's abbreviated attire will undoubtedly raise the old question of just what constitutes real art in such matters. This will shock some viewers. The husband's conscientious scruples were rather too sudden to be very convincing. This holds the interest throughout, but it undoubtedly steps over the line of delicacy to an extent.".
