= Virtue Is Its Own Reward =

1914 film

- Directed by: Joe De Grasse
- Written by: John Barton Oxford (story); Harry G. Stafford (screenplay)
- Starring: Pauline Bush; Lon Chaney
- Distributed by: Universal Pictures
- Release date: October 11, 1914
- Running time: 2 reels (approximately 20 minutes)
- Country: United States
- Language: Silent with English intertitles

Virtue Is Its Own Reward (aka Virtue Its Own Reward) is a 1914 American silent drama film directed by Joe De Grasse and featuring Lon Chaney and Pauline Bush. It was written by Harry G. Stafford from a story by John Barton Oxford.

The film is basically considered to be a lost film, although in 2018, a 25-foot fragment of the film was found in a Brooklyn attic stuck inside a Keystone Moviegraph projector and the footage was donated to the George Eastman House. The footage only runs about 17 seconds and includes two very brief shots of Lon Chaney in it.

Actor Tom Forman (who played Seadley Swaine in the film) later directed Lon Chaney in Shadows (1922). A still exists showing Lon Chaney as the unsavory department manager, Duncan Bronson.

== Plot ==
Annie Partlan works long hours in a local canning factory so that she can pay for her sister Alice's education. Unknown to Annie, Alice is engaged to Seadley Swaine, the son of a wealthy businessman. Alice ignores Annie's advice and secretly takes a job herself at the canning factory to earn enough money to purchase a wedding gown. In the factory, Alice meets Duncan Bronson, a department manager who has a very bad reputation. Bronson starts making advances toward Alice, and against Annie's wishes, she cultivates a relationship with the unsavory character, and starts to ignore her fiance Seadley Swaine. Annie thinks Alice is making a big mistake, and sets about to save her sister.

One day, Annie shows up at work in a brand new sexy dress that she has purchased with her savings, and starts acting more like a loose woman. Bronson forgets all about Alice and turns his attentions to the more attractive Annie. A spurned Alice goes back to her former fiancee, Seadley Swaine, and they are married. Now, the danger past, Annie goes back to wearing her old plain clothes and wearing her hair up in an unattractive bun once again. Everyone in the factory gossips about Annie now, but she is content knowing that she saved her sister from an unsavory fate.

== Cast ==
- Pauline Bush as Annie Partlan
- Gertrude Bambrick as Alice Partlan
- Tom Forman as Seadley Swaine
- Lon Chaney as Duncan Bronson

== Reception ==
"There is some very good acting in this number on the part of all the principals and it gets up a strong interest. Some real life in this number."—Moving Picture World

"Rather a pathetic story, in which Pauline Busch (sic) and Lon Chaney play the leads." --- Motion Picture News

== See also ==
- List of lost films
