= Remember Mary Magdalen =

1914 film by Allan Dwan

- Directed by: Allan Dwan
- Written by: Allan Dwan (uncredited)
- Produced by: Victor Film Company
- Starring: Pauline Bush; Murdock MacQuarrie; Lon Chaney
- Distributed by: Universal Film Manufacturing Company
- Release date: February 23, 1914
- Running time: 20 minutes (2 reels)
- Country: United States
- Languages: Silent; English intertitles

Remember Mary Magdalen is a 1914 silent short drama film directed by Allan Dwan and featuring Pauline Bush, Murdock MacQuarrie, and Lon Chaney. The film is now considered lost.

== Plot ==
Repenting of a foolish mistake she made in her youth, a fallen woman returns to her home town planning to settle down, only to find that her parents have died. As she walks through the streets, the villagers shun her and news quickly spreads that the repentant sinner has returned. The citizens call upon their new minister to force the woman to leave town. When he delivers their message, she refuses to leave her parents' house and he is touched by the sincerity of her repentance, and develops strong feelings for her. Meanwhile, a mob gathers to drive her out of the village. The woman bravely steps outside to meet them, but they jeer and throw stones at her until the minister steps in to protect her. A half-witted orphan tries to defend the woman, but he is hit in the head with a brick and killed. Shocked at the young man's death, the crowd disperses, and the minister and the woman find happiness together.

== Cast ==
- Pauline Bush as The woman
- Murdock MacQuarrie as The minister
- Lon Chaney as The half-wit

== Reception ==
"Moving Picture World" wrote: "Pauline Bush appears in this as a fast woman who returns to her old home town. She gives a sincere rendition of the part. The minister and the half-witted boy were good and some of the minor characterizations pleasing. The story itself makes no great appeal to the emotions, and finishes rather abruptly."

"Motion Picture News" wrote: "A good drama which presents several morals..."
