= The Lie (1914 film) =

1914 film

- Directed by: Allan Dwan
- Written by: Jeanie Macpherson
- Starring: Murdock MacQuarrie; Pauline Bush; Lon Chaney
- Distributed by: Universal Film Manufacturing Company
- Release date: January 6, 1914
- Running time: 20 minutes
- Country: United States
- Languages: Silent; English intertitles

The Lie is a 1914 American silent short western drama film directed by Allan Dwan and featuring Murdock MacQuarrie, Pauline Bush, and Lon Chaney. The film is now considered lost. A still exists from the film showing Chaney as "Young MacGregor".

== Plot ==
Auld MacGregor is a stern, religious old Scotsman who hoards his money while his son and daughter live in abject poverty. A gambler plots to rob MacGregor of his money, and he works up a friendship with MacGregor's son by giving him gambling winnings. Arthur, who dislikes the gambler, tells Auld MacGregor where his son got the money he's been spreading around, and the old man fights with his son. Young MacGregor gets in a saloon fight with the gambler, and both Arthur and MacGregor's daughter each fire a gun at the gambler simultaneously. Arthur's bullet kills the gambler, but since she is not aware that Arthur also fired a shot at the gambler, the girl believes it was her bullet that killed the man. MacGregor's son convinces his father to lie for the girl and provide an alibi for her, which goes against all his religious beliefs. The truth is later revealed, however, and Arthur is charged with the murder.

== Cast ==
- Murdock MacQuarrie as Auld MacGregor
- Lon Chaney as MacGregor's son
- Pauline Bush as MacGregor's daughter
- James Neill as The Gambler
- William Lloyd as MacGregor's brother
- Richard Rosson as Youth #1
- Arthur Rosson as Youth #2
- Fred McKay as Youth's Father

== Reception ==
"Motion Picture World" stated: "This is a very good two-reel production....The story is interestingly presented and holds interest from the beginning. It is perhaps a little drawn-out in places, but on the whole the film is a commendable one."

"Moving Picture World" stated: "It is a great play. There is a remarkable and unique situation...Allan Dawn (sic), one of the Universal top-notch directors, has produced this play. It is laid in the West, and if there is a place on the green earth that Mr. Dwan is familiar with, it is the West and its people. He has made every scene ring with realism."
