= Outside the Gates =

1915 film

- Directed by: Joe De Grasse
- Written by: Ida May Park
- Produced by: Rex Motion Picture Co.
- Starring: Lon Chaney; Pauline Bush
- Distributed by: Universal Pictures
- Release date: March 14, 1915
- Running time: 2 reels (20 minutes)
- Country: United States
- Language: Silent with English intertitles

Outside the Gates is a 1915 American silent fantasy film directed by Joe De Grasse and featuring Lon Chaney and Pauline Bush. It is thought to have been scripted by Ida May Park (De Grasse's wife). The film is now considered to be lost.

== Plot ==
Sister Ursula is a nun in a convent in Southern Spain. One day, while the peddler Perez comes to the convent to sell his wares, she sees Manuel, a handsome cavalier, riding by and she cannot suppress her attraction to him. Perez sells the Abbess a beautiful length of fabric for an altar cloth, but when Ursula is putting it away, she cannot resist the temptation to cover herself in the cloth and admire her own beauty. Coming to her senses, she runs to the Abbess to confess her sins. Her penance is to kneel in vigil before the altar all night long, but during the night she falls asleep. She dreams that Perez tempts her to leave the convent with him by saying he will bring her to Manuel.

Ursula travels with Perez while disguised as a boy, and they come upon a group of thieves in the forest who attack and imprison Manuel when he rides near their camp. With the help of Perez, Ursula drugs the thieves on guard duty and the two help Manuel to escape.

The trio comes upon a troupe of dancing girls, who think Ursula is really a young boy and tease her for being shy. Carmela, one of the dancers, attempts to win Manuel's favor, and when he ignores her advances, she attacks him with a knife. Ursula steps in her path and is stabbed in the arm. While tending to Ursula's wound, Manuel discovers she is actually a nun. The dancing girls plan a feast for Ursula, but Carmela denounces her as a fallen nun. They all attack her and brutally beat her for her sins. Suddenly Ursula wakes up on the altar with the Abbess beside her, and realizes it was all just a bad dream. She never really left the convent at all. Ursula and the Abbess pray together for her forgiveness.

== Cast ==
- Pauline Bush as Sister Ursula
- Lon Chaney as Perez, the peddler
- William C. Dowlan as Manuel, a cavalier
- Helen Wright as the Abbess
- Carmen Phillips as Carmela, a dancing girl

== Reception ==
"One of Joseph De Grasse's productions in which the writer evidently put a lot of thought, but some of the actions of the characters will be more apt to strike the spectator as humorous than serious. However, the story is very well constructed and contains some psychological ideas which will make people think twice. The scenes in the convent are beautiful and the rest are almost equally artistic. William Dowlan is a chevalier and Lon Chaney gets in some fine character work as the peddler." ---Motion Picture News
