= The Tragedy of Whispering Creek =

1914 film

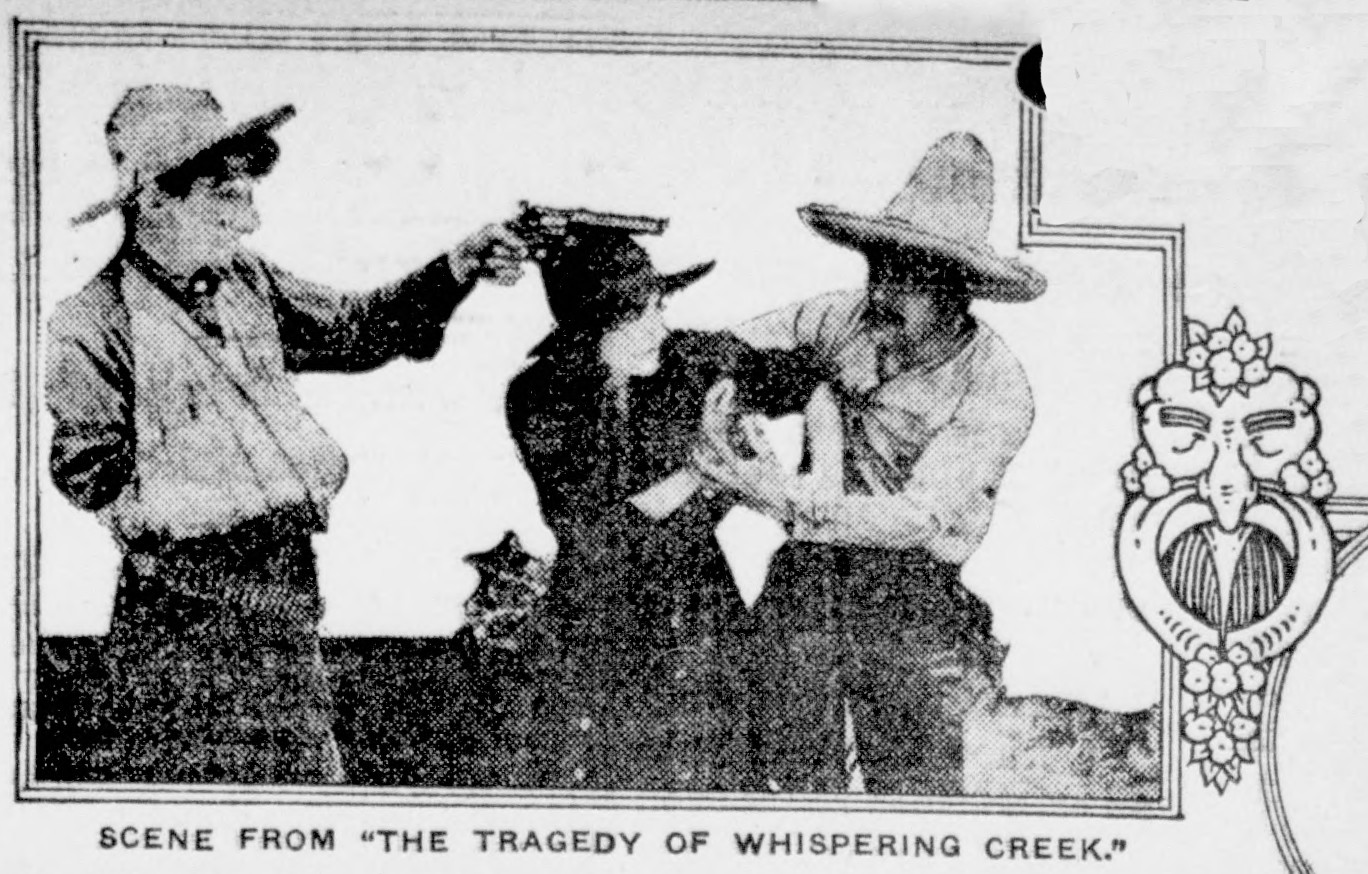
- Newspaper publicity photo
- Directed by: Allan Dwan
- Written by: Allan Dwan (screenplay); Elliott J. Clawson (original story)
- Starring: Murdock MacQuarrie; Pauline Bush; Lon Chaney
- Cinematography: Lee O. Bartholomew
- Distributed by: Universal Film Manufacturing Company
- Release date: May 2, 1914
- Running time: 20 minutes
- Country: United States
- Languages: Silent; English intertitles

The Tragedy of Whispering Creek is a 1914 American short silent Western film directed by Allan Dwan and featuring Murdock MacQuarrie, Pauline Bush, and Lon Chaney. Chaney expert Jon Mirsalis says Chaney also wrote the screenplay, based on a story by Elliott J. Clawson, but the Blake book says the film's director Allan Dwan wrote the screenplay himself. A print exists in the Deutsche Kinemathek film archive, making it Chaney's earliest surviving moving picture. A still exists which shows Chaney in his role as "The Greaser".

== Plot ==
A vile bully known as The Greaser is terrorizing the young ladies in a mining town called Whispering Creek. When he tries to accost a young teenage orphan girl, her fiancé Bashful Bill gives the Mexican a sound beating. Soon after, a handsome stranger rides into town and saves the same girl from the Greaser again. Falling in love with her himself, he tries to romance the young lady, unaware that she is engaged to Bashful Bill.

When he learns they are set to be wed, he decides to not interfere in their happiness. The stranger leaves town, but on the way out, he spots the Greaser lying in ambush, plotting to kill Bashful Bill and the girl. The stranger and the Greaser shoot it out, and wind up killing each other in the ensuing gunfight, saving Bill's and the girl's life in the process.

== Cast ==
- Murdock MacQuarrie as The Stranger
- Pauline Bush as The Orphan
- William C. Dowlan as Bashful Bill
- Lon Chaney as The Greaser
- George Cooper as The Kid
- Mary Ruby as The Kid's Sweetheart
- Doc Crane as Prospector
- William Lloyd as Prospector
- John Burton as Prospector

== Reception ==
The Moving Picture World wrote "The story is very uncertain in development, but has an unusually pleasing setting throughout the entire production. The backgrounds were selected with a good eye to artistic effects. The story is vague in places and the photography not quite up to standard. The closing scenes are of a tragical nature."

Universal Weekly opined "And then there is Mr. Chaney in the role of the Greaser. Mr. Chaney has used his own ideas in working out the character, a pervert, in this play and what he has given us is startling to an unusual degree. True, he paints a horrible picture for us...one that is apt to cause a feeling of revulsion. But that is as it should be. In fact, Mr. Chaney has created a new character -- one that will live long -- that will be copied as a newer standard for others."
