= The Lion, the Lamb, the Man =

1914 film

- Directed by: Joe De Grasse
- Written by: Tom Forman
- Produced by: Rex Film Co.
- Starring: Lon Chaney; Pauline Bush
- Distributed by: Universal Pictures
- Release date: December 6, 1914
- Running time: 2 reels (only 1 reel exists however)
- Country: United States
- Language: Silent with English intertitles

The Lion, the Lamb, the Man is a 1914 American silent drama film directed by Joe De Grasse, written by Tom Forman and featuring Lon Chaney and Pauline Bush. Though once believed to be lost, a shortened version of the film was preserved by the Museum of Modern Art in 2008, and was re-premiered at the 2017 Cinecon Classic Film Festival in Hollywood, California.

A nitrate print was discovered by film collector Bob Geoghegan and his Archive Film Agency in England in 2007. They loaned it to the Museum of Modern Art who made a dupe negative and a release print in 2008. The first public screening was at Cinecon in September, 2017. Though the film was originally released at 2 reels, the print that survives appears to be only 1 reel. Most of the opening footage is missing, so the film begins with Agnes already living in the Kentucky mountains. A still exists showing one of the actors in makeup as a cave man (see plot synopsis).

Co-star Millard K. Wilson and Chaney became life-long friends. Wilson worked as an assistant director on many of Chaney's later films for MGM.

== Plot ==
Agnes Duane returns from college to her New England home and is surprised to find that her parents have chosen an effeminate minister named Percival Higginbotham to be her husband. She laughs at their poor choice, and to cure her of her intransigence, she is sent to live with her uncle in the mountains of Kentucky. There she meets the two Brown brothers who both fall in love with her. The younger brother tries to force himself on her, but he is stopped by the older brother. In a flashback fantasy sequence, the brothers are shown as two savage cave men in the prehistoric past who fight over the primitive woman they love. Back in the present, Agnes later escapes from the two men and meets the Reverend Hugh Baxton, a real man, and Agnes realizes he is the only man she could ever truly love.

== Cast ==
- Pauline Bush as Agnes Duane (The Woman)
- Lon Chaney as Fred Brown (The Lion)
- Millard K. Wilson as Bert Brown (The Fox)
- William C. Dowlan as the Reverend Hughe Baxton (The Man)
- Gus Inglis as the Reverend Percival Higginbotham (The Lamb)

== Reception ==
"Produced in a telling manner by Joseph De Grasse. Pauline Bush, Lon Chaney and Millard K. Wilson are well cast. The director has fitted the remote past with the present in a fine way, and the two reels are always entertaining."—Motion Picture News

"This has been done frequently in about the same way. It always possesses a certain amount of interest. This is handled with a fair degree of strength."—Moving Picture World
