= When the Gods Played a Badger Game =

1915 film

- Directed by: Joe De Grasse
- Written by: Ida May Park
- Starring: Pauline Bush; Lon Chaney
- Distributed by: Universal Pictures
- Release date: February 28, 1915
- Running time: 2 reels
- Country: United States
- Language: Silent with English intertitles

When the Gods Played a Badger Game is a 1915 American silent drama film directed by Joe De Grasse and written by Ida May Park, and featuring Pauline Bush and Lon Chaney. The film's working title was The Girl Who Couldn't Go Wrong. The film is today considered lost.

== Plot ==
Nan DeVere is a chorus girl who is romanced by Mr. Lany, a married man of considerable wealth. She agrees to marry him, but Mrs. Lany meets her at the theatre and begs her to stay away from her husband. She tells her of their former life of poverty, how he made a lucky mining strike, and then left her behind as he entered high society. Nan is moved by the woman's plea, and plans to teach the husband a good lesson with the help of Joe, the property man. She sends word to Mr. Lany that she will see him after the show.

The millionaire arrives at the theatre and takes her in his arms when suddenly Joe bursts in, pulling out a revolver and claiming to be Nan's husband. Mr. Lany, thinking he is the victim of a badger game, tells them that he is still in love with his wife, the only true-hearted woman in the world, and he leaves Nan's dressing room and goes back to be reunited with his wife.

== Cast ==
- Pauline Bush as Nan DeVere, the chorus girl
- Lon Chaney as Joe, the property man
- T. D. Crittenden as Mr. Lany, the millionaire
- Florence Weil as Mr. Lany's wife
- Olive Carey (credited as Olive Golden) as Marie, a chorus girl

== Reception ==
"Pauline Bush appears in this as a chorus girl. A married man pays her attention and at the wife's request she has the "prop" boy pretend to be her husband. The plot is quite pleasing and the behind-the-scenes settings are attractive." -- Moving Picture World

"A very strong offering made by Joseph De Grasse and a company headed by Pauline Bush and Lon Chaney, who plays the property man instead of his accustomed role of heavy. This is very well acted and constructed and will draw considerably on the sympathies of all."—Motion Picture News
