= The End of the Feud =

1914 film by Allan Dwan

- Directed by: Allan Dwan
- Written by: Richard Rosson
- Produced by: Rex Film Co.
- Starring: Murdock MacQuarrie; Pauline Bush; Lon Chaney
- Distributed by: Universal Film Manufacturing Company
- Release date: April 12, 1914
- Running time: 20 minutes
- Country: United States
- Languages: Silent; English intertitles

The End of the Feud is a 1914 American silent drama film directed by Allan Dwan and featuring Murdock MacQuarrie, Pauline Bush, and Lon Chaney. The film is now considered lost.

== Plot ==
The hillbilly families of Hen Dawson and Jed Putnam have been engaged in a deadly feud for fifty years. Dawson lives with a daughter named June, and a nephew named Wood Dawson who is in love with his cousin June. Jed Putnam has only a son named Joel, who has been secretly romancing June.

One day a new preacher moves into the territory and convinces the two patriarchs to stop their senseless feuding. They lay down their arms and declare a truce. Then Wood learns that Joel Putnam has been dating Wood's cousin June in secret. Wood starts spreading rumors that the two lovers have been engaged in immoral acts. The two rivals fight it out, and in the melee, Joel kills Wood Dawson.

Enraged over the death of his nephew, Hen Dawson forgets his oath and sets out to kill Joel Putnam. However, when he finds Joel, June is with him, getting ready to elope. Violence is averted at the last moment. The preacher once again gets the two warring clans to declare a truce by quickly marrying June and Joel, thus uniting the two families forever.

== Cast ==
- Murdock MacQuarrie as Hen Dawson
- Pauline Bush as June Dawson
- Lon Chaney as Wood Dawson
- William Lloyd as Jed Putnam
- William C. Dowlan as Joel Putnam
- Jessalyn Van Trump

== Reception ==
"Motion Picture News" stated "Drama of the South, beautiful scenery throughout....A good love story with unusual ending."

"Moving Picture World" said "A mountain feud story that works up into some gripping situations...Some excellent scenic effects heighten the interest of the film. The story is old in subject matter, but handled in a convincing manner."
