= The Measure of a Man (1915 film) =

1915 film

- Directed by: Joe De Grasse
- Written by: Tom Forman
- Starring: Lon Chaney; Pauline Bush
- Distributed by: Universal Pictures
- Release date: January 28, 1915
- Running time: 2 reels
- Country: United States
- Language: Silent with English intertitles

The Measure of a Man is a 1915 silent drama film directed by Joe De Grasse, written by Tom Forman, and featuring Lon Chaney and Pauline Bush. The film today is considered lost. (Note* - This film should not be confused with the 1916 Universal film of the same title which starred J. Warren Kerrigan).

== Plot ==
Helen MacDermott has been brought up in a strict religious environment by her widowed father until she meets Bob Brandt, a dashing adventurer/ gambler who sweeps her off her feet. She elopes with him over her father's objections, and all is well until 6 months later when the local Vigilant Committee denounces Brandt as a cheat and a swindler, and orders him to leave town. Helen is too proud to return to her father, and loathes divorce, so she reluctantly leaves with Bob.

A month later, Bob accidentally shoots himself in the shoulder; he is discovered by Jim Stuart, a lieutenant in the Northwest Mounted Police, who takes him and Helen to his cabin and nurses the injured man back to health. Jim soon develops a warm friendship with Bob and Helen, and he gets Bob a job with the Mounties. Jim falls in love with Helen, but because of his friendship with Bob, he leaves without saying goodbye to her and resigns from the Mounties.

Bob finds a diary that Helen has been keeping and reads how she has secretly fallen in love with Jim. Realizing that Jim is the better man, Bob finds Jim and brings him back to be with Helen. When Helen realizes the sacrifice Bob has made to make her happy, she realizes that Bob is the man she truly loves after all, and chases after him just in time to save him from being killed by an Indian. She throws herself into Bob's arms and asks his forgiveness.

== Cast ==
- Pauline Bush as Helen MacDermott
- William C. Dowlan as Bob Brandt
- Lon Chaney as Lt. Jim Stuart of the Mounties
- Joe De Grasse in an Undetermined Role

== Reception ==
"The story has numerous tense moments and is well photographed throughout."---Moving Picture World

"The action of this drama is rather slow but a good story runs through it and it will be enjoyed by those who care for a little action."—Motion Picture News
