= Lights and Shadows (1914 film) =

1914 film

- Directed by: Joe De Grasse
- Written by: Ida May Park
- Starring: Tom Forman; Pauline Bush; Lon Chaney
- Distributed by: Universal Pictures
- Release date: November 29, 1914
- Running time: 2 reels (20 minutes)
- Country: United States
- Language: Silent with English intertitles

Lights and Shadows is a 1914 American silent drama film directed by Joe De Grasse, starring Tom Forman, Pauline Bush and Lon Chaney. The screenplay was written by Ida May Park (De Grasse's wife). A still exists showing Lon Chaney as Bentley, just before he deserts his wife in the film. The picture is now considered to be a lost film.

== Plot ==
Eve, a poor flower girl, learns that her mother, a singer, had married Bentley, the son of a rich man, but Bentley's father disinherited him for marrying a stage performer. So Bentley deserted his wife the night Eve was born, leaving the young mother penniless, and their nurse Matilde raised the girl after her mother died. When the old nurse falls ill, Eve gets a job in a cafe selling flowers to raise money to help the nurse. There she meets Victor Austin who makes advances towards her, but she manages to escape from him. When she returns home, she finds the nurse dead.

Eve discovers some old letters that she thinks could aid her in locating her deadbeat father. Along the way, she is robbed of her ticket and all of her money and joins up with a theatrical troupe who feel sorry for her. The star of the company, James Gordon, falls in love with her, but she learns that he is married and runs away. Gordon later receives an important offer from the New York stage. Meanwhile Eve manages to find her father Bentley who has since come into great wealth. He plans to force Eve to marry the loutish Victor Austin, but then Eve learns that Gordon's wife, who never really loved him, has died. Gordon is now free to remarry. Eve travels to New York and finds Gordon at the New York theatre where they are happily reunited.

== Cast ==
- Pauline Bush in a dual role as both Eve and Eve's mother
- Lon Chaney as Bentley, Eve's deadbeat father
- Tom Forman as the loutish Victor Austin
- Joe De Grasse as James Gordon
- Laura Oakley
- Betty Schade
- Beatrice Van
- William C. Dowlan
- Helen Wright

== Reception ==
"This story is slightly too complicated to make a good picture and too much time is covered. The ending is abrupt and one is left to speculate upon the final outcome."—Motion Picture News

"This offering is peculiar in construction, and while not uninteresting, contains much of a semi-morbid character. It lacks bright, attractive scenes and is brought to a very abrupt close. The acting and photography are good."—Moving Picture World

== See also ==
- List of lost films
