= William C. Dowlan =

American actor (1882–1947)

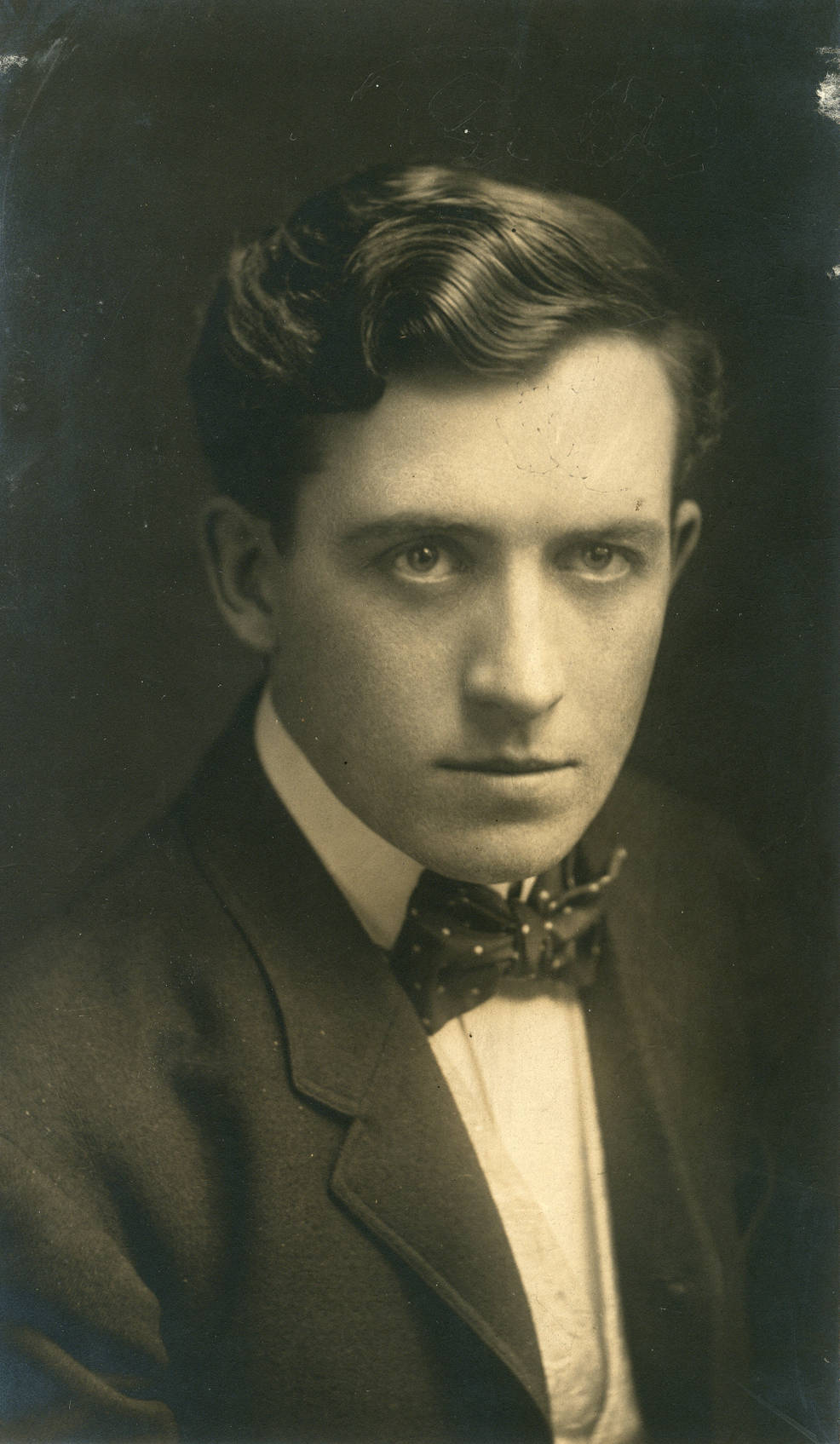
- Dowlan in 1908
- Born: September 21, 1882; St. Paul, Minnesota, US
- Died: November 6, 1947 (age 65); Los Angeles, California, US
- Occupations: Actor; Film director
- Years active: 1901–1920
- Spouse: Leonora Ainsworth (m. 1906–1939; her death)

William C. Dowlan (September 21, 1882 – November 6, 1947) was an American stage performer and a film actor and director during the silent era. Most of his directorial projects were done in collaboration with his wife, screenwriter Leonora Ainsworth. Between 1915 and 1917 he and Ainsworth did extensive work together for Universal Film Manufacturing Company in Los Angeles and for the American Film Company at its facilities in Santa Barbara.

== Early life and stage career ==
William Christopher Dowlan was born 1882 in St. Paul, Minnesota, the eldest son of five children of Mary E. (née Collins) and William Dowlan, who was a native of Canada and in 1900 was working as a "clerk & driver". Young William grew up in St. Paul, where he received his formal education at Christian Brothers School and where he also developed an early interest in acting and stagecraft. After serving briefly as a soldier in 1900, Dowlan began his decade-long stage career. The trade magazine Motion Picture News describes his stage experience in a short "authorized" biography of Dowlan published in 1916:

Almost immediately after finishing his education [Dowlan] took up work on the stage, and with the exception of the time when he managed and starred in his own road company, he played in stock and productions...In this period he played in many of the principal theatres from coast to coast, appearing in Chicago, Philadelphia, Vancouver, B.C.; Omaha, Portland, Ore[gon].; the Oliver Morosco stock in Los Angeles, and at Dallas, Texas, and in other cities.

== Film ==
In 1912 Dowlan refocused his acting career, turning from the stage to the rapidly expanding entertainment medium of motion pictures. That year he relocated to California and began performing in lead roles as a contract player with the new Universal Film Manufacturing Company, which had just merged with the Nestor Film Company. In fact, Dowlan's initial acting assignments in 1912 were in shorts produced under Universal's Nestor logo or "brand". Later, after several years of performing before the camera, Dowlan became interested in directing as well, often serving as both actor and director in the same production. The first in a series of films in which he performed those dual roles was the 1915 one-reeler short Her Mysterious Escort. The next year he retired from acting after performing in and directing Drugged Waters, which was released in March 1916. The screenplay for that film, like most of Dowlan's productions in this period, was written by his wife Leonora Ainsworth. Soon after the release of Drugged Waters, both Dowlan and Ainsworth left Universal. He then joined the American Film Company to direct Youth's Endearing Charm, starring Mary Miles Minter and Harry von Meter. Following the completion of that film in the summer of 1916, he continued to direct for other studios for several more years, until he retired from the film industry in the early 1920s.

== Post-film work ==
Dowlan's wife Leonora had stopped working as a screenwriter even before William quit directing films. The couple did, though, continue to live in Los Angeles and work together in an entirely new business, that of merchandising women's apparel. By 1930 Dowlan, Ainsworth, and Leonora's 35-year-old daughter Harriet from her previous marriage (long ago adopted by Dowlan) were living in a rented residence at 326 North Palm Drive in "Beverly Hills City". All three members of the family were working then as co-owners or "sales managers" of a shop specializing in "Dresses, underwear and hosiery".

== Personal life and death ==
Dowlan married Leonora Ainsworth in 1906 and lived in Minnesota before relocating to California in 1912. He died in 1947 at age 65 and was buried next to his wife in Forest Lawn Memorial Park in Glendale, California.

== Partial filmography ==
- The Menace to Carlotta (1914)
- The Embezzler (1914)
- The End of the Feud (1914)
- The Tragedy of Whispering Creek (1914)
- The Unlawful Trade (1914)
- The Forbidden Room (1914)
- The Hopes of Blind Alley (1914)
- Richelieu (1914)
- The Lion, the Lamb, the Man (1914)
- A Night of Thrills (1914)
- Her Escape (1914)
- The Sin of Olga Brandt (1915)
- The Star of the Sea (1915)
- The Measure of a Man (1915)
- The Threads of Fate (1915)
- Such Is Life (1915)
- Where the Forest Ends (1915)
- Outside the Gates (1915)
- All for Peggy (1915)
- The Desert Breed (1915)
- An Idyll of the Hills (1915)
- Under the Crescent (1915)
- Her Mysterious Escort (1915)
- The College Orphan (1915)
- The Devil and Idle Hands (1915)
- The Great Fear (1915)
- Their Secret (1915)
- Across the Footlights (1915)
- Lavinia Comes Home (1916)
- Drugged Waters (1916)
- Madcap (1916)
- Youth's Endearing Charm (1916)
- Daughter Angele (1917)
- The Outsider (1917)
- Restless Souls (1919)
- Loot (1919)
- Under Suspicion (1919 American release)
- Common Property (1919)
- Peddler of Lies (1920)
- The Chorus Girl's Romance (1920)
- Dangerous to Men (1920)
