= The Sin of Olga Brandt =

1915 film

- Directed by: Joe De Grasse
- Written by: Ida May Park
- Produced by: Carl Laemmle
- Starring: Lon Chaney; Pauline Bush
- Distributed by: Universal Pictures
- Release date: January 3, 1915
- Running time: 2 reels (20 minutes)
- Country: United States
- Language: Silent with English intertitles

The Sin of Olga Brandt is a 1915 American silent drama film directed by Joe De Grasse and featuring Lon Chaney and Pauline Bush. Jon Mirsalis claims the film was written by Ida May Park (De Grasse's wife) and that "some sources suggest that the film, which preaches about the high morality of moving pictures, was instigated by (producer) Carl Laemmle, who was involved in censorship fights of his own over some of his releases".

The film is now considered to be lost. A still exists showing Lon Chaney as Stephen Leslie, trying to intimidate Olga Brandt (see plot).

== Plot ==
Olga is a stenographer working in the office of an attorney, Stephen Leslie. She cares for her invalid sister who needs an expensive operation to save her life, so she appeals to her employer who agrees to give her the money only if she will give herself to him sexually. Having no choice, she reluctantly agrees to move in with him; however, three months later, her sister dies and she realizes her sacrifice was all for naught. Olga leaves the attorney and is befriended by the Rev. John Armstrong, who brings her to live with his mother. Their friendship blossoms into love and she and the reverend eventually marry.

One year later, the town is embroiled in a controversy when the local theatre shows a silent movie entitled "Shall We Forgive Her?", which depicts a woman's story very similar to Olga's. Deacon Jellice wants the picture banned and a lawyer is called in to arbitrate. The lawyer turns out to be Stephen Leslie, who sees Olga and threatens to expose her past transgressions if she does not move back into his home and be his mistress once again.

Olga plans to run away from both men this time and leaves a written confession for Reverend John to find, but on her way out of town, she chances to enter the theatre where the film is playing. She is moved by the story so similar to her own, and the film ends with the title "Judge Not Lest Ye Be Judged". Leslie also sees the movie and becomes repentant. Catching Olga at the train station, he asks her forgiveness and tells her that she should go home to her husband. She returns home where the Reverend John has already read her confession, but remembering the moral of the picture, he forgives Olga and embraces her.

== Cast ==
- Pauline Bush as Olga Brandt
- William C. Dowlan as Rev. John Armstrong
- Lon Chaney as Stephen Leslie, a vile attorney-at-law
- Cleo Madison
- Charles Manley as Deacon Jellice

== Reception ==
"A two-reel number, featuring Pauline Bush, Wm. Dowlan and Lon Chaney. The girl stenographer consents to live with her employer because of her sick sister. The sister dies and the girl leaves him. Later she marries a young minister. The scene at the moving picture show, where the committee passes upon a similar situation, was to the point and interesting. The minister forgives his wife after her confession, remembering the biblical admonition, "Judge not that ye be not judged".... This is very well done for this type of offering. The photography is very good and the cast handles the story well." -- Moving Picture World

"A delicate story handled in a manner which will not offend by Joseph De Grasse's company headed by Pauline Bush, Lon Chaney and William Dowlan."—Motion Picture News
