= Discord and Harmony =

1914 film by Allan Dwan

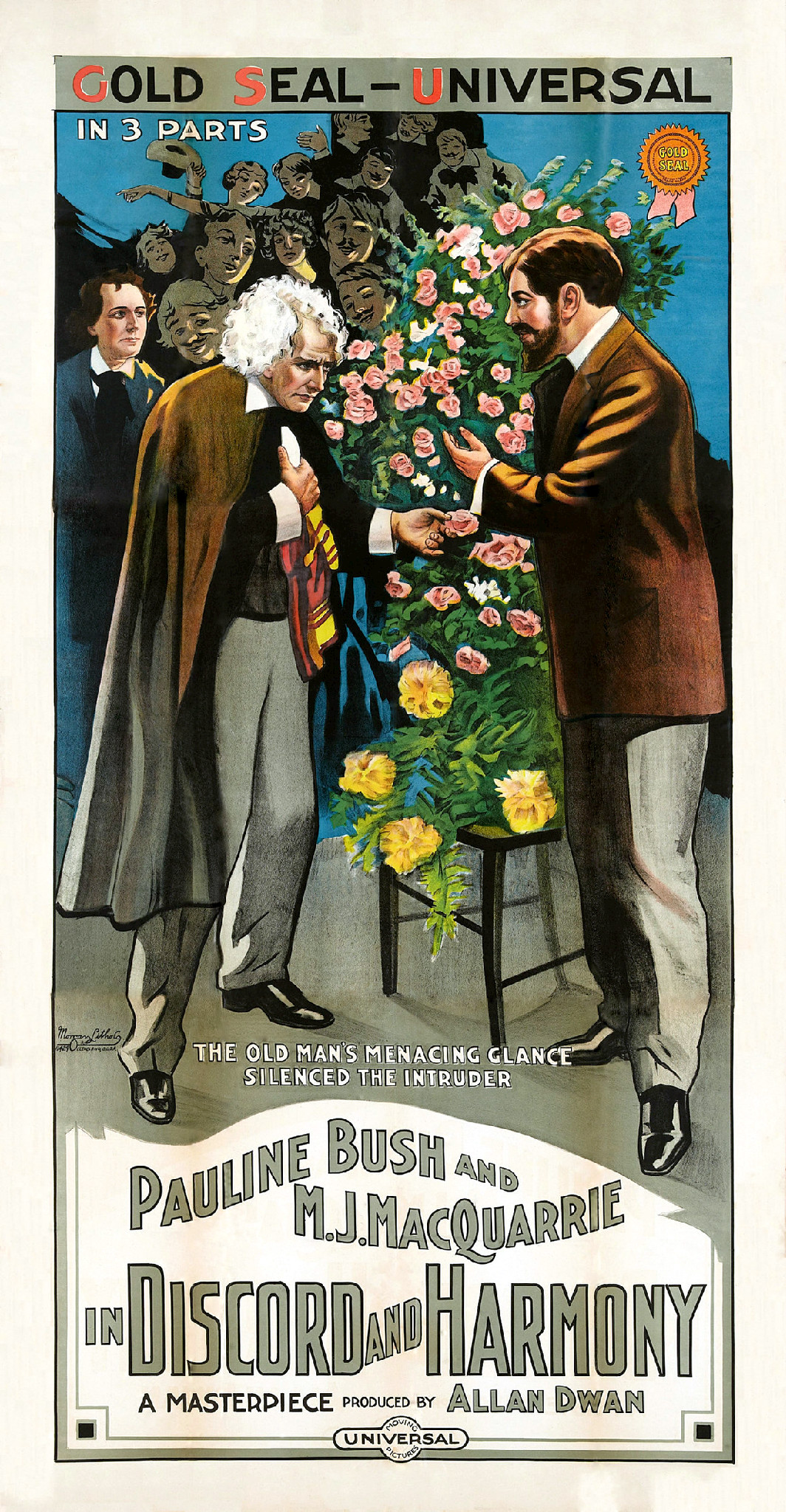
- Film poster
- Directed by: Allan Dwan
- Written by: Arthur Rosson
- Starring: Murdock MacQuarrie; Pauline Bush; Lon Chaney
- Distributed by: Universal Film Manufacturing Company
- Release date: March 17, 1914
- Running time: 30 minutes
- Country: United States
- Languages: Silent; English intertitles

Discord and Harmony is a 1914 American silent short romantic drama film directed by Allan Dwan and featuring Murdock MacQuarrie, Pauline Bush, and Lon Chaney. The film's scenario, written by Arthur Rosson, was based on an event experienced by composer Ludwig van Beethoven. The film is now considered lost.

== Plot ==
Joy reigns in a colony of struggling artists because Old Felix, a composer, has at last sold one of his symphonies. The night of its initial hearing at the Grand Opera House, the members of the colony turn out en masse. Too poor for orchestra seats, they gather in the gallery around the old composer. The old composer is happy almost to tears, and when the last note has died away there is a cry for the composer. Felix attempts to utter a few words of thanks, but is smothered with flowers. At his studio his friends have prepared for his welcome, and it is upon his arrival there that be feels the happiness which comes of success.

However, at the other end of the hall a different drama is being enacted. A girl sits beside her stricken mother, and as the merriment in the studio reaches its height, her mother dies. After all of his friends have left, the disconsolate girl seeks Felix's Felix. The old musician is touched and he carries all of his flowers into the death room and agrees to lend the girl financial assistance. The following day, Felix legally adopts the girl as his ward.

Lon, a sculptor, is impressed by her simplicity and beauty, and falls in love with her. Forrest, an artist, comes onto the girl and is rejected by her. Felix puts up the money for Lon to travel to Europe and study, and Lon secretly marries the girl before leaving, with Felix's consent. Forrest overhears when Lon and the girl are discussing their intimate plans, and unaware that they are now legally married, he spreads vicious gossip to discredit the girl's reputation, and finally on the eve of Lon's departure, he convinces Felix's friends that he is right. The old musician is utterly oblivious to what is going on; he scarcely notices that all of his friends are deserting him one by one. They decide to tell Felix exactly what kind of woman he has adopted. Old Felix drives them from his studio in anger. However, he is rendered feeble by the thought of losing all his old friends. He labors with feverish haste to complete his last symphony, but Life has taken too great a toll on him and he staggers into his bedroom and dies.

The girl finds him there, and tells his old friends he is dead. They congregate around Felix's bedside, and play his last symphony one more time, hoping his soul will forgive them. Lon, the sculptor, returns from Europe, famous, and while the party of friends are still standing around the death-bed, Lon enters the room and greets the girl as his wife. Now the culprits understand the grave injustice of their treatment of Old Felix, and again gather around his bed in mourning.

== Cast ==
- Murdock MacQuarrie as Old Felix, the Composer
- Lon Chaney as The Sculptor
- Pauline Bush as The Girl
- Allan Forrest as Forrest, the gossiping artist
- James Neill as The Symphony Conductor
- John Burton

== Reception ==
"Motion Picture News" wrote "A very melancholy production somewhat similar in certain respects to a number of its predecessors, yet vastly different than others. Excellent make-up and good direction are responsible for its telling points.....A splendid finale is registered."

"Moving Picture World" wrote "There is very little story here for a three-reel production; but while it fails to convince a critical spectator, it will pass very well indeed with the majority and will decidedly interest them. It has quality and plenty of it due to the players, to the atmosphere around artistic and musical people and perhaps most of all the beauty of its scenes."
