= Where the Forest Ends =

1915 film

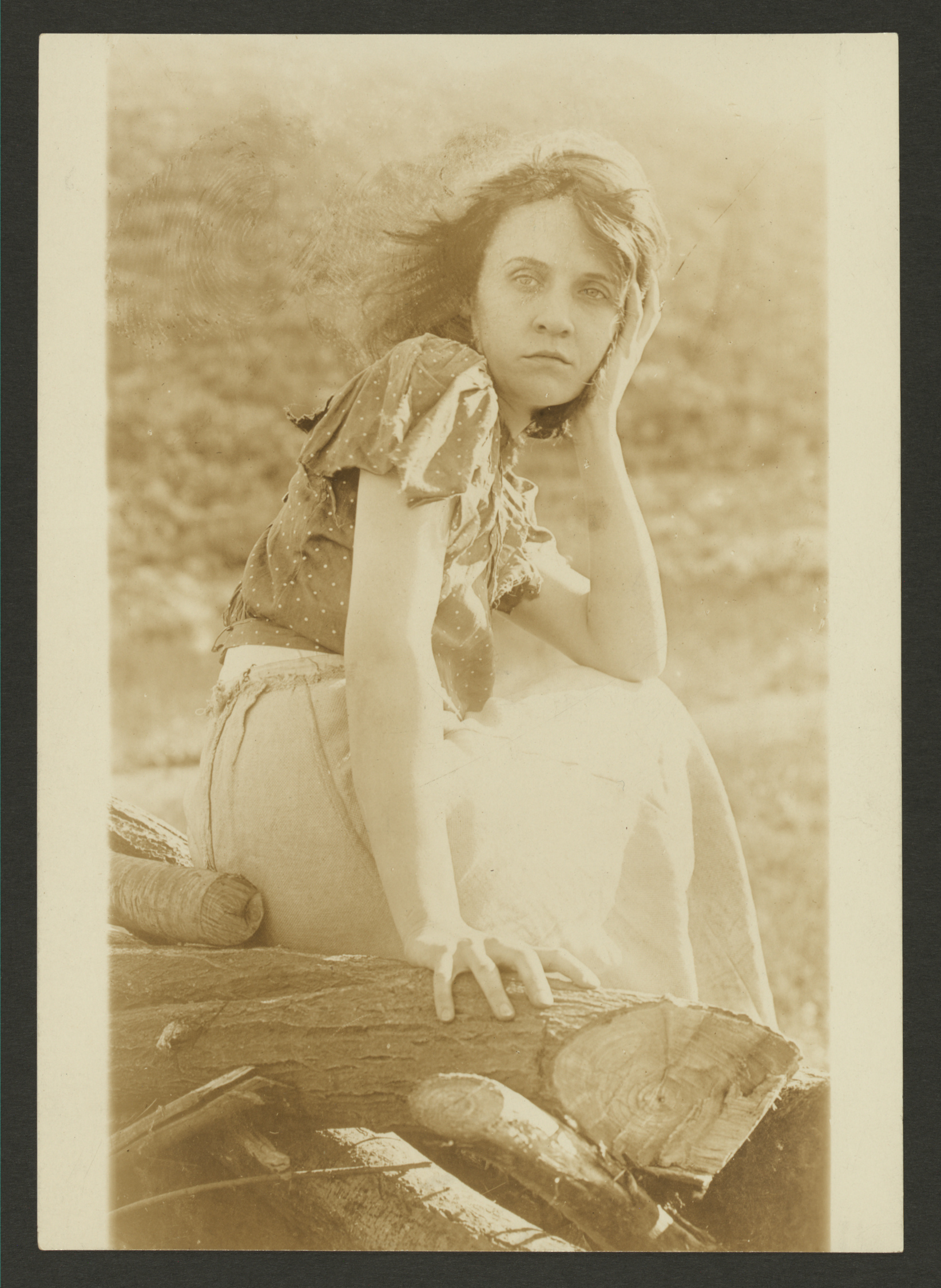
- Pauline Bush in Where the Forest Ends
- Directed by: Joe De Grasse
- Written by: Ida May Park (screenplay); Olga Printzlau (original story)
- Starring: Pauline Bush; Lon Chaney
- Distributed by: Universal Pictures
- Release date: March 7, 1915
- Running time: 2 reels (20 minutes)
- Country: United States
- Language: Silent with English intertitles

Where the Forest Ends is a 1915 American silent drama film directed by Joe De Grasse and featuring Lon Chaney and Pauline Bush. De Grasse also acted in this film as well, playing "Silent Jordan". The film was written by Ida May Park (De Grasse's wife), based on a story by Olga Printzlau. (Some sources (such as imdb.com) list James Dayton as the writer of the screenplay.) The film is today considered to be lost. A still from the film can be seen online.

== Plot ==
Rose, a beautiful mountain girl, is raised to womanhood by a cruel old hag in a hut on a mountainside. Jack Norton, a handsome Ranger, admires the girl, and his affection is slowly turning into love, but just then he is called away on a patrol. Silent Jordan, an old prospector and friend of Jack's, finds the girl's face very familiar, and then realizes that she is his old sweetheart's daughter.

Paul Rouchelle, an artist visiting the mountains, sees the girl and gets her to pose for him. Rose falls in love with the well polished gentleman who promises a life of excitement and glamour, and she consents to marry him. He takes her back to his art studio in the big city, but she soon learns that he already has a wife and child, so she leaves him and goes back to the mountains. Paul follows her and plans to steal her back when Jack arrives. Paul tells Jack that Rose was his mistress and Paul attacks him in anger. Silent Jordan stops Jack from shooting Paul, and forces the artist to leave. (A still exists showing Silent Jordan preventing Jack from shooting Paul Rouchelle).

Rose finds out that the old hag who raised her has died in Rose's absence, and she is now all alone in the world. Jack asks Rose if what Paul said was true; she nods sadly and confesses it is true, and Jack turns away. Silent Jordan takes the sad couple to a little grave on a hillside and tells them the story of how he loved a girl once many years before, but abandoned her on their wedding day when he discovered she already had a baby daughter. He returned years later to find that the girl he abandoned had died of a broken heart, and he has regretted leaving her ever since, becoming a hermit as a result. (That woman's baby was Rose, which explains why she was raised by the old hag who took the child in.) Jack, with tears in his eyes, embraces Rose, and they are married.

== Cast ==
- Pauline Bush as Rose
- Lon Chaney as Paul Rouchelle, the artist
- William C. Dowlan as Jack Norton, the Ranger
- Joe De Grasse as Silent Jordan

== Reception ==
"A two-reel number produced by Jos. Degrasse, who plays a leading part. Pauline Bush appears as a waif of the hills and Wm. Dowlin and Lon Chaney are hero and villain respectively. The girl dresses in wild grapevines and dances over the hills. The artist lures her to the city, but when her moral awakening comes, she flees back to the mountains. He pursues her and some dramatic scenes occur toward the close. This is a crude production in some respects and quite artistic in others. The plucking of the rose was an excellent symbolic touch. This has more than average strength." ---Moving Picture World

"This story is old but it is so artistically told that it appears new...Lon Chaney is excellent as the heavy."—Motion Picture News
