= The Desert Breed =

1915 film

- Directed by: Joe De Grasse
- Written by: Tom Forman
- Starring: Lon Chaney; Pauline Bush
- Distributed by: Universal Pictures
- Release date: March 28, 1915
- Running time: 2 reels (20 minutes)
- Country: United States
- Languages: Silent; English intertitles

The Desert Breed is a 1915 American silent Western film directed by Joe De Grasse, written by Tom Forman, and featuring Lon Chaney and Pauline Bush. It is now considered to be a lost film.

== Plot ==
Two fugitives, Fred and Jack, dash out of the tiny town of Rawhide one night with a posse in hot pursuit. At the desert's edge, they come upon the cabin of Jessie, whom the townspeople refer to as "The Girl of the Desert". Jessie refuses to open the door to the two strangers and when they break in, one of the men lights a match and sees Pauline in the shadows pointing a revolver at them. They agree to leave her alone, if she will let them camp out near the cabin for the night.

The posse meanwhile has split up, and three members of the group approaches Jessie's cabin. They break in and Jessie wounds one of them, thinking they are the two outlaws returning. The posse members fire back, and Frank and Jack are awakened by the sound of gunshots. They come to the girl's defense and manage to capture and restrain the three posse members. Out of gratitude, Jessie offers to show the fugitives the trail that will bring them safely across the desert to the border.

Fred was wounded back at the cabin and starts hallucinating at one point, but after many hardships, they reach the border. They are alarmed to find the waterhole they were seeking has dried up, but Jessie manages to find them another source of water. Jessie leaves them there and, waving goodbye, she returns to her cabin.

== Cast ==
- Pauline Bush as Jessie
- Lon Chaney as Fred
- William C. Dowlan as Jack, Fred's partner

(Note* - Some sources refer to Pauline Bush's character in this film as "Pauline".)

== Reception ==
"This picture is full of strange charm and both acting and settings combine to produce the fascinating desert atmosphere. It is artistically handled and makes an unusual appeal to the observer. A strong offering." ---Moving Picture World

"An original drama of a decidedly pleasing nature, relying more on the clearly drawn characters for interest rather than the plot which, if analyzed, would prove almost nil...Mr. Chaney gets in an excellent piece of character work in this part." ---Motion Picture News

== See also ==
- List of lost films
