= The Unlawful Trade =

1914 film by Allan Dwan

- Directed by: Allan Dwan
- Written by: George Cooper; Allan Dwan
- Starring: Pauline Bush; William Lloyd
- Distributed by: Universal Film Manufacturing Company
- Release date: May 14, 1914
- Running time: 20 minutes
- Country: United States
- Languages: Silent; English intertitles

The Unlawful Trade is a 1914 American silent short drama film directed by Allan Dwan and starring Pauline Bush, William Lloyd, Murdock MacQuarrie, George Cooper, and Lon Chaney. Allan Dwan also wrote the screenplay, based on a story by George Cooper. The film is now considered lost.

== Plot ==
A moonshiner named George Tate is a good-hearted man, even though he is a criminal. A half-breed murders George's father and later harasses his sister Amy. The half-breed then tells government agents of the location of the moonshiner's hideout in the wilderness, and the authorities attack the place while George, Amy and Amy's lover Neut Haigh happen to be staying there. In the heat of the gunfight, George gallantly allows Neut and Amy to escape through a secret trap door in the cabin while he stays behind to fight the officers, a gesture that costs George his life.

== Cast ==
- George Cooper as George Tate, the moonshiner
- Pauline Bush as Amy Tate
- William Lloyd as Tate's father
- William C. Dowlan as Neut Haigh
- Murdock MacQuarrie as The Revenue Man
- Lon Chaney as The Half-Breed

== Reception ==
Motion Picture News stated "Undoubtedly one of the best pictures Universal has made....The story of the moonshiners and their war on the revenue men, yet is different from the thousand or so others of this class." Moving Picture World wrote "This is another of many moonshine stories which is filled with melodrama from start to finish. Murder and assault predominate with the shadow of the law overhanging all. There is a theme of love introduced which somewhat softens the ragged edges of the plot, and the sacrifice made by the hero is somewhat redeeming."
