= Red Margaret, Moonshiner =

1913 film by Allan Dwan

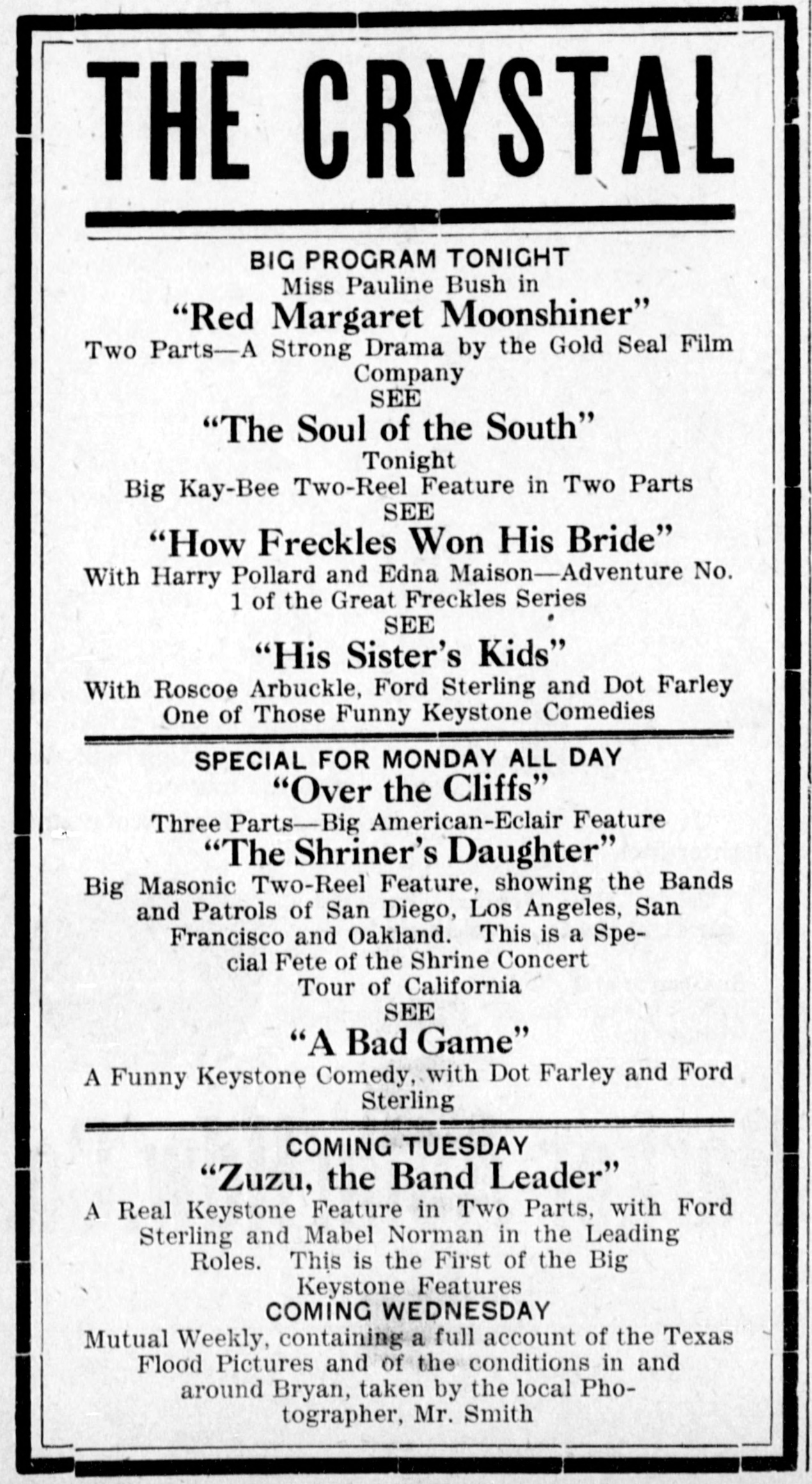
- Newspaper advertisement for the film and several others.
- Directed by: Allan Dwan
- Written by: Jeanie Macpherson
- Starring: Pauline Bush; Murdock MacQuarrie; Lon Chaney; James Neill
- Distributed by: Universal Film Manufacturing Company
- Release date: December 9, 1913
- Running time: 20 minutes
- Country: United States
- Language: Silent with English intertitles

Red Margaret, Moonshiner is a 1913 American silent short romance film directed by Allan Dwan, starring Pauline Bush, Murdock MacQuarrie and Lon Chaney. This film, now considered lost, is a good example of Chaney's early attempts at creating bizarre makeups to enhance his roles, wearing a long beard and wild hair here as "Lon", the old moonshiner. The film's original working title was Warrington's Honor. Some sources say the film was later edited down to one reel and re-released in theaters as Moonshine Blood in 1916.

== Plot ==
"Red" Margaret is the leader of a band of mountain moonshiners who have thwarted every attempt of the authorities to capture them. A government agent is sent up to the hills to assist in breaking up the gang, and Margaret falls in love with him. Lon, Margaret's moonshiner boyfriend, discovers the identity of the government agent and forces Margaret to write a letter which lures him to her cabin. Fearing for his safety, the girl notifies the authorities of the agent's danger. The police arrive and capture the moonshiners. Margaret's father is killed in the melee, and the agent is left behind, wounded. A deputy tries to take credit for the capture, but Margaret helps the injured agent get back to the sheriff's office and pretends that she is his prisoner. The agent is honored for his work and Margaret is sent off to prison, a happy woman.

== Cast ==
- Pauline Bush as Margaret "Red Margaret"
- Murdock MacQuarrie as Government Agent
- James Neill as The Sheriff
- Lon Chaney as Lon, The Old Moonshiner

== Reception ==
"Moving Picture World" stated: "Pauline Bush gives a good portrayal...It is a disagreeable part and a hard one, but she makes much of it. There are good mountain backgrounds." "Motion Picture News" stated: "Just why she is called 'Red' is not apparent. Pauline Bush interprets the part well, but there is no cause for the name except that it sounds melodramatic."
