= Joseph De Grasse =

Canadian film director (1873–1940)

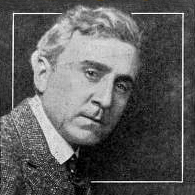
- Joseph De Grasse in 1916
- Born: May 4, 1873; Bathurst, New Brunswick, Canada
- Died: May 25, 1940 (aged 67); Eagle Rock, Los Angeles, United States
- Burial place: Hollywood Forever Cemetery
- Occupation: film director
- Spouse: Ida May Park (m. 1901)
- Children: 1
- Relatives: Sam De Grasse (brother); Robert De Grasse (nephew)

Joseph Louis De Grasse (May 4, 1873 – May 25, 1940) was a Canadian film director. Born in Bathurst, New Brunswick, he was the elder brother of actor Sam De Grasse.

== Biography ==
Joseph De Grasse had studied and was a first-class graduate of accounting and he began his career as a journalist, but soon became enamored with the theater and took work as a stage actor. In 1903, he quit his full-time job as the City of Boston's bookkeeper to pursue acting. In 1910, he acted in his first motion picture and although he would appear as an actor in 13 films, and write 2 screenplays, his real interest was in directing.

While working in Hollywood for Universal Pictures, De Grasse met and married one of the few female directors working at the time, Ida May Park (1879–1954). In 1915, he became a founding member of the Motion Picture Directors Association, a forerunner to today's Directors Guild of America.

During his career he directed a total of 86 films. In 1924, actor Lon Chaney said of the De Grasses:

Joe and Sam De Grasse are two of the most talented personalities in today's film industry. Joe, a very skilled actor, is also the consummate director, firm in his demands yet gentle in his way of dealing with many different temperaments to be found in the movie industry. Sam is the only actor I know who can horrify an audience without make-up and without grotesque posturing and playing to the camera. He is the only actor I know who pulls teeth on the set in between takes. A rare pair, they have given the industry not one but two dimensions.

Joseph De Grasse died in Eagle Rock, California; he collapsed on a street while walking, and was taken to hospital where he was pronounced dead. The cause of his death was a heart attack.

== Filmography ==
=== Director ===
- Her Bounty (1914)
- The Pipes o' Pan (1914)
- Virtue Is Its Own Reward (1914)
- Her Life's Story (1914)
- Lights and Shadows (1914)
- The Lion, the Lamb, the Man (1914)
- A Night of Thrills (1914)
- Her Escape (1914)
- The Sin of Olga Brandt (1915)
- The Star of the Sea (1915)
- The Measure of a Man (1915)
- The Threads of Fate (1915)
- When the Gods Played a Badger Game (1915)
- Such Is Life (1915)
- Where the Forest Ends (1915)
- Outside the Gates (1915)
- All for Peggy (1915)
- The Desert Breed (1915)
- Maid of the Mist (1915)
- The Grind (1915)
- The Girl of the Night (1915)
- An Idyll of the Hills (1915)
- The Stronger Mind (1915)
- Steady Company (1915)
- Bound on the Wheel (1915)
- Mountain Justice (1915)
- The Pine's Revenge (1915)
- The Fascination of the Fleur de Lis (1915)
- Alas and Alack (1915)
- A Mother's Atonement (1915)
- Lon of Lone Mountain (1915)
- The Millionaire Paupers (1915)
- Under a Shadow (1915)
- Father and the Boys (1915)
- Stronger Than Death (1915)
- Dolly's Scoop (1916)
- The Grip of Jealousy (1916)
- Tangled Hearts (1916)
- The Gilded Spider (1916)
- Bobbie of the Ballet (1916)
- The Grasp of Greed (1916)
- The Mark of Cain (1916)
- If My Country Should Call (1916)
- The Place Beyond the Winds (1916)
- The Price of Silence (1916)
- The Piper's Price (1917)
- Hell Morgan's Girl (1917)
- The Mask of Love (1917)
- The Girl in the Checkered Coat (1917)
- A Doll's House (1917)
- Pay Me! (1917)
- Triumph (1917)
- The Empty Gun (1917)
- Anything Once (1917)
- The Winged Mystery (1917)
- The Scarlet Car (1917)
- The Fighting Grin (1918)
- A Broadway Scandal (1918)
- The Brand of Lopez (1920)
- 45 Minutes from Broadway (1920)
- Bonnie May (1920)
- Thundergate (1923)
- Flowing Gold (1924)

=== Actor ===
- The Place Beyond the Winds (1916) - Anton Farwell
- Triumph (1917) - Man at Theatre (uncredited)
- After the War (1918)
- So Big (1924) - Simeon Peake
- The Cowboy Kid (1928) - John Grover
- The Drunkard (1935) - Mr. Miller
- The Dawn Rider (1935) - Dad Mason
- The Adventures of Frank Merriwell (1936, Serial) - Dr. Cummings (uncredited) (final film role)

== Preservation ==
The three surviving reels of De Grasse's film Triumph were restored by the Academy Film Archive in 2012.

== See also ==
- Other Canadian pioneers in early Hollywood
