= A Night of Thrills =

1914 film

- Directed by: Joe De Grasse
- Written by: Ida May Park
- Produced by: Rex Film Co.
- Starring: Pauline Bush; Lon Chaney
- Distributed by: Universal Pictures
- Release date: December 13, 1914
- Running time: 2 reels (20 minutes)
- Country: United States
- Language: Silent with English intertitles

A Night of Thrills is a 1914 American silent supernatural drama film directed by Joe De Grasse, written by Ida May Park (uncredited) (who was De Grasse's wife) and featuring Lon Chaney and Pauline Bush. The film is now considered to be lost. Some sources say this film may never have actually been released at all, since not a single review of the film has ever turned up anywhere, but the Blake book claims it was released theatrically on Dec. 13, 1914.

== Plot ==
Howard Wild, a kindly old gentleman, bequeaths his old mansion to his young niece Hazel and her fiancé Jack as a wedding present. A few days before the wedding, Hazel hears some terrible gossip about Jack, and after a spat, she leaves him and flees to the mansion to be alone. That night some thieves arrive to rob the house and Hazel watches them, helpless and terrified. When the criminals go down into the wine cellar, she runs for the door, but just then Jack enters and, mistaking him for another burglar in the dark, she screams and faints. Hearing her scream, The burglars run from the house, thinking the place is haunted, and leave the loot behind. Jack revives Hazel, but she still refuses to make up with him. Suddenly the ghost of old Uncle Howard appears before them and acts as a peacemaker, reuniting them again. The two lovebirds return home to be married.

== Cast ==
- Pauline Bush as Hazel
- William C. Dowlan as Jack
- Charles Manley as Uncle Howard Wild, The Ghost
- Lon Chaney credited as "The Visitor"
