= The Hopes of Blind Alley =

1914 film by Allan Dwan

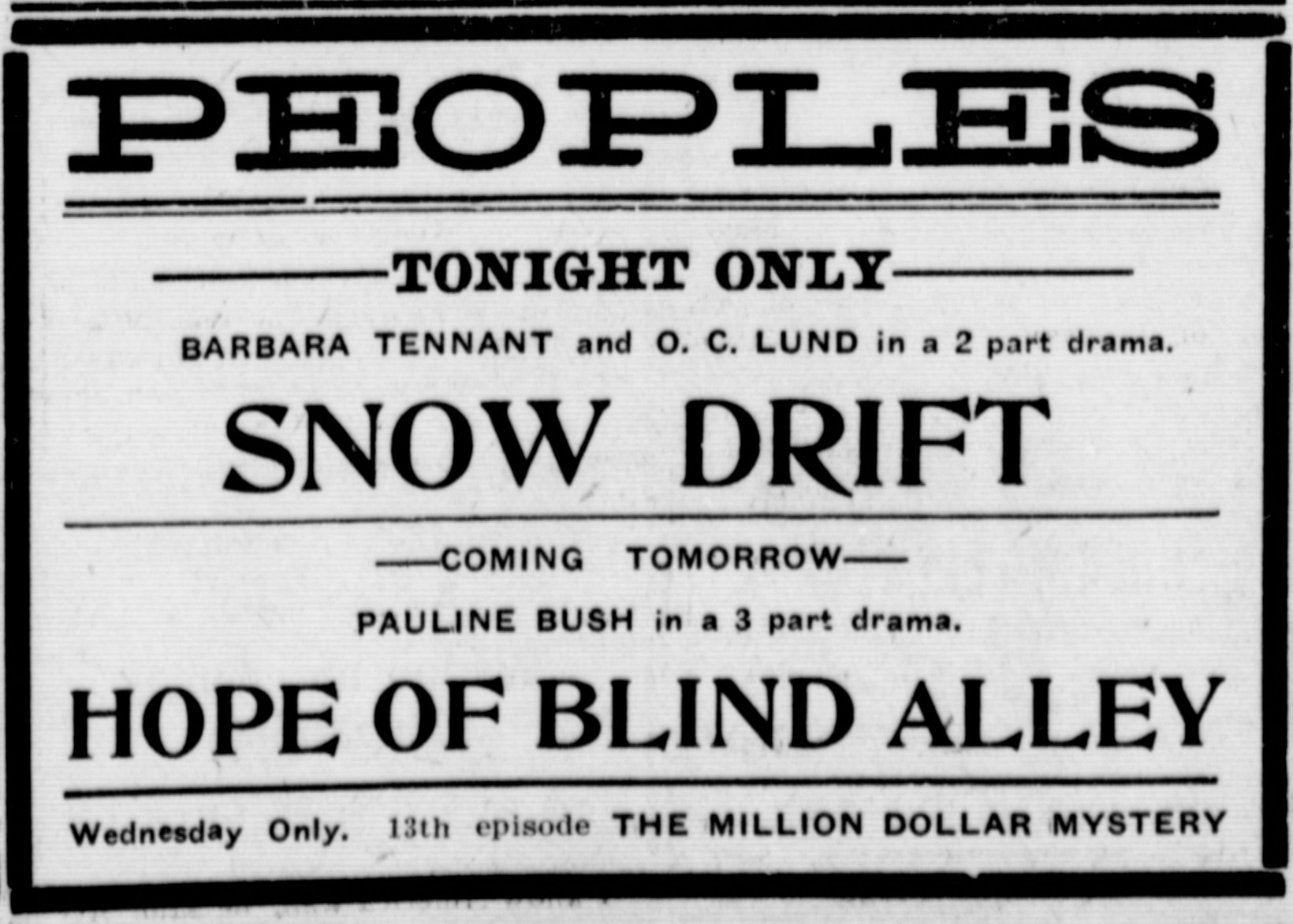
- Newspaper advertisement
- Directed by: Allan Dwan
- Written by: Allan Dwan; Murdock MacQuarrie; Grace Johnson
- Starring: Pauline Bush; Murdock MacQuarrie; Lon Chaney
- Cinematography: Lee O. Bartholomew
- Distributed by: Universal Pictures
- Release date: July 4, 1914
- Running time: 30 minutes (3 reels)
- Country: United States
- Language: Silent with English intertitles

The Hopes of Blind Alley is a 1914 American silent drama film directed (and co-written) by Allan Dwan and featuring Murdock MacQuarrie, Pauline Bush and Lon Chaney. A still exists showing Lon Chaney as the Italian statuette vendor. The film is now considered to be lost.

== Plot ==
Old Jean Basse and his granddaughter Pauline live in poverty-stricken Blind Alley, and they sell miniature statues to make a living. Jean's one ambition in life is to own a high silk hat, and when he comes into a small inheritance, he buys a hat and plans to use the rest of money to help his neighborhood friends. He finds out afterwards that the entire inheritance he is getting consists of nothing but a dusty old painting.

Pauline is in love with a young struggling artist who lives in their building, and upon showing him the painting her father has inherited, the young artist proclaims it to be an original Van Dyke, worth a fortune. A famous artist learns of the painting and first tries to cheat Jean out of it by offering him $2.00 for it, then attempts to steal it outright, but he is unsuccessful.

Pauline's sweetheart manages to sell several of his paintings and then proposes marriage to her. On the day of the wedding, the young couple present Jean with a brand new silk hat, but they learn the old man is dying. Putting the new hat on his head, he gives his valuable painting to the newlyweds as a wedding gift from his deathbed.

== Cast ==
- Murdock MacQuarrie as Old Jean Basse
- Pauline Bush as Pauline, Jean's Daughter
- William C. Dowlan as The Young Struggling Artist
- Lon Chaney as The Italian Vendor of Statuettes
- George Cooper as Little Janitor

== Reception ==
Moving Picture World stated "This (picture) has a number of strong points. It gives an intimate and convincing picture of tenement life. It develops a pleasing story, naturally and appealingly, and has a number of strong character parts. Murdock MacQuarrie makes a memorable part of the old grandfather. The Italian vendor of the statuettes (Lon Chaney) made a good touch, and the silk hat episode contains the right human element. The whole production shows an unusual feeling for picturing real life on the screen. A strong offering."

Motion Picture News stated "This story seems to ring true to human feelings. The plot is powerful. The action does not drag."
