= The Embezzler (1914 film) =

1914 film by Allan Dwan

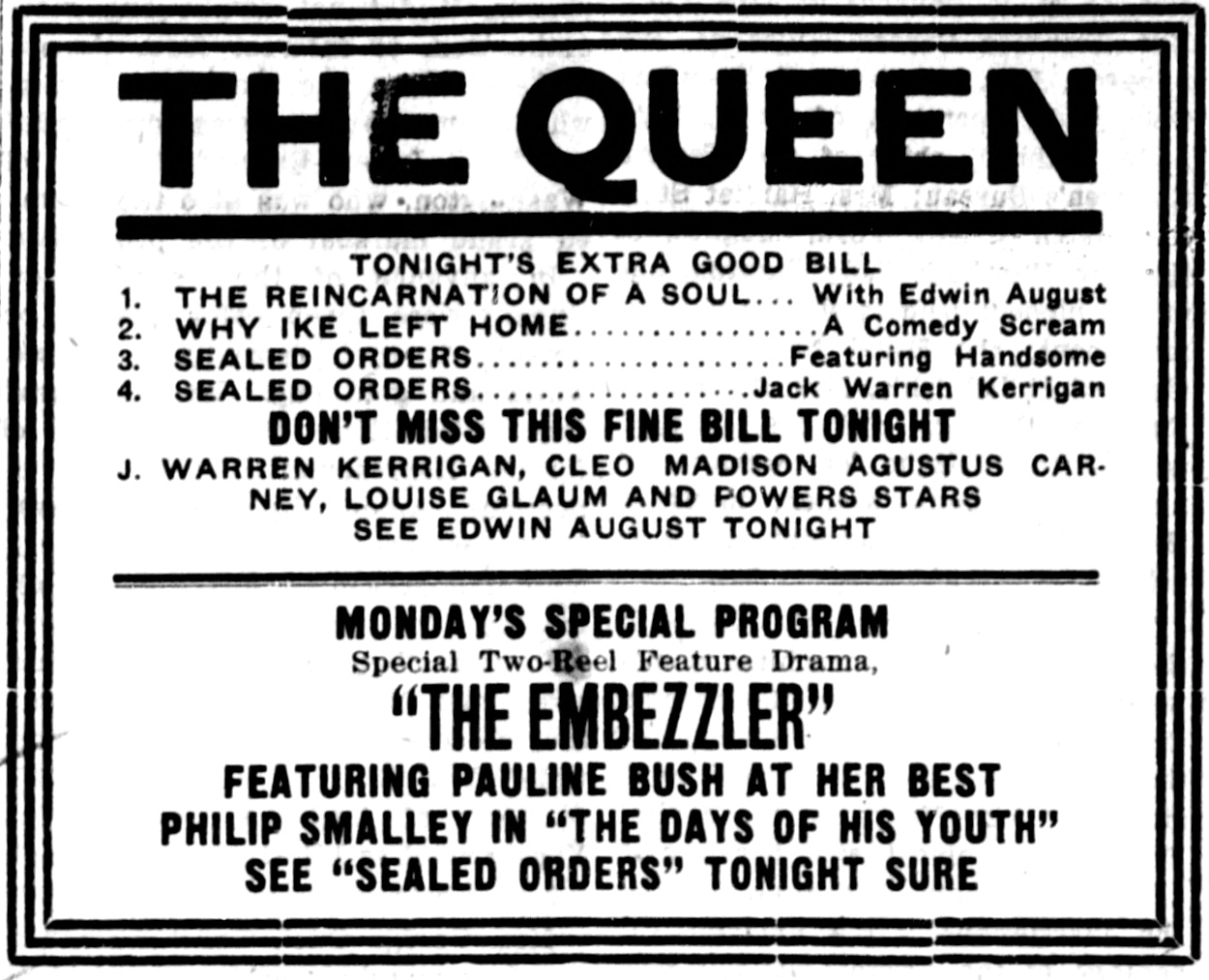
- Newspaper advertisement.
- Directed by: Allan Dwan
- Written by: Allan Dwan
- Starring: Murdock MacQuarrie; Pauline Bush; Lon Chaney
- Distributed by: Universal Film Manufacturing Company
- Release date: March 31, 1914
- Running time: 20 minutes
- Country: United States
- Language: Silent with English intertitles

The Embezzler is a 1914 American silent short drama film directed by Allan Dwan and featuring Lon Chaney, Pauline Bush and Murdock MacQuarrie. The film is now considered lost. A still exists showing Chaney in the J. Roger Dixon role.

== Plot ==
John Spencer's daughter is completely unaware that her father has a criminal past. A seedy character named J. Roger Dixon attempts to blackmail the old man, threatening to tell his daughter the truth about her dad. After a while, Dixon becomes bolder and insists on marrying the young girl. The problem is she is already engaged to Arthur Bronson, a handsome young attorney. Dixon tells Spencer he must aid him in sullying the attorney's reputation, and Dixon hires two underworld thugs to help him frame Bronson as an embezzler.

Spencer's daughter overhears the criminals plotting and tells her father about the scheme to frame her fiancé. At this point, Spencer confesses everything to his daughter and tells her how Dixon's been blackmailing him for years. Although Spencer's daughter is now aware of her dad's former misdeeds, Dixon now threatens to reveal the sordid story to the whole world unless the girl marries him. The young woman agrees to the marriage in order to save her father's reputation, but before the marriage can take place, Dixon is killed in a falling out between him and his two criminal compatriots. With Dixon dead, the young woman is now free to marry Arthur.

== Cast ==
- Murdock MacQuarrie as John Spencer
- Pauline Bush as Pauline, his daughter
- Lon Chaney as J. Roger Dixon, a blackmailer
- William C. Dowlan as Arthur Bronson, the young attorney
- William Lloyd as William Perkins (Thug #1)
- Richard Rosson as Dick (Thug #2)
- Gertrude Short

== Reception ==
"Moving Picture World" wrote "The plot is familiar in most of its details. The girl's father is in the power of the villain, played by Lon Chaney, who blackmails him at will...The story is well constructed, but not very fresh in subject matter." --

== Censorship ==
The Chicago Board of Censors removed the scenes of a man taking a blank receipt, a man taking papers out of a safe, the shooting of a man, and the intertitle "When crooks fall out."

== See also ==
- List of lost films
