= The Forbidden Room (1914 film) =

1914 film by Allan Dwan

- Directed by: Allan Dwan
- Written by: Bess Meredyth
- Produced by: Thomas H. Ince
- Starring: Murdock MacQuarrie; Pauline Bush; Lon Chaney
- Cinematography: Lee O. Bartholomew
- Distributed by: Universal Pictures
- Release date: June 20, 1914
- Running time: 30 minutes
- Country: United States
- Language: Silent with English intertitles

The Forbidden Room is a 1914 American silent drama film directed by Allan Dwan and featuring Murdock MacQuarrie, Pauline Bush and Lon Chaney. The film's working title was originally The Web of Circumstance. The film is now considered to be lost.

== Plot ==
Fulfilling a promise made to his mother on her deathbed, Dr. James Gibson locates his sister Pauline who has run away after giving birth to an illegitimate child. His sister has lost her sanity, and Gibson takes her and his baby niece home with him. The years pass and the niece grows into a beautiful young woman while her mother is kept locked in a room that the niece is forbidden to enter. Gibson and his wealthy neighbor, John Morris, are both interested in hypnotism, and one night the two men conduct an experiment by hypnotizing Gibson's niece. Pauline sees Morris from her window and recognizes him as the man who fathered her child and then deserted her. One night she escapes from her room, wearing her daughter's shawl, and stabs Morris to death. Returning home, she touches her daughter's hair, placing bloodstains on the sleeping girl. Morris is found murdered, the young girl's shawl is found near his body, and his blood is found on the still sleeping girl. The niece is arrested and charged with murder, but Pauline is later found dead in her room, clutching a watch that was stolen from Morris, and the young girl is acquitted.

== Cast ==
- Murdock MacQuarrie as Dr. James Gibson
- Pauline Bush in a dual role as Gibson's sister / niece
- William C. Dowlan as Prosecuting Attorney
- Lon Chaney as John Morris
- John Burton as Dr. Jarvis

== Reception ==
Motion Picture News wrote "The feature of this picture is a mystery which throughout sustains the interest of the audience."

Moving Picture World wrote "This melodrama depends upon the powerful, thoroughly human situations involved rather than on any sensational, hair-raising incidents. THE FORBIDDEN ROOM is...distinctly original, with powerful situations and strong climaxes. Miss Bush enacts a dual role...her work in this picture is wonderfully impressive, realistic and human. This is horrible, in the same way that Poe's stories are horrible, and audiences that enjoy a strong admixture of the weird and terrible will find this greatly to their liking."
