= Pauline Bush (actress) =

American actress (1886–1969)

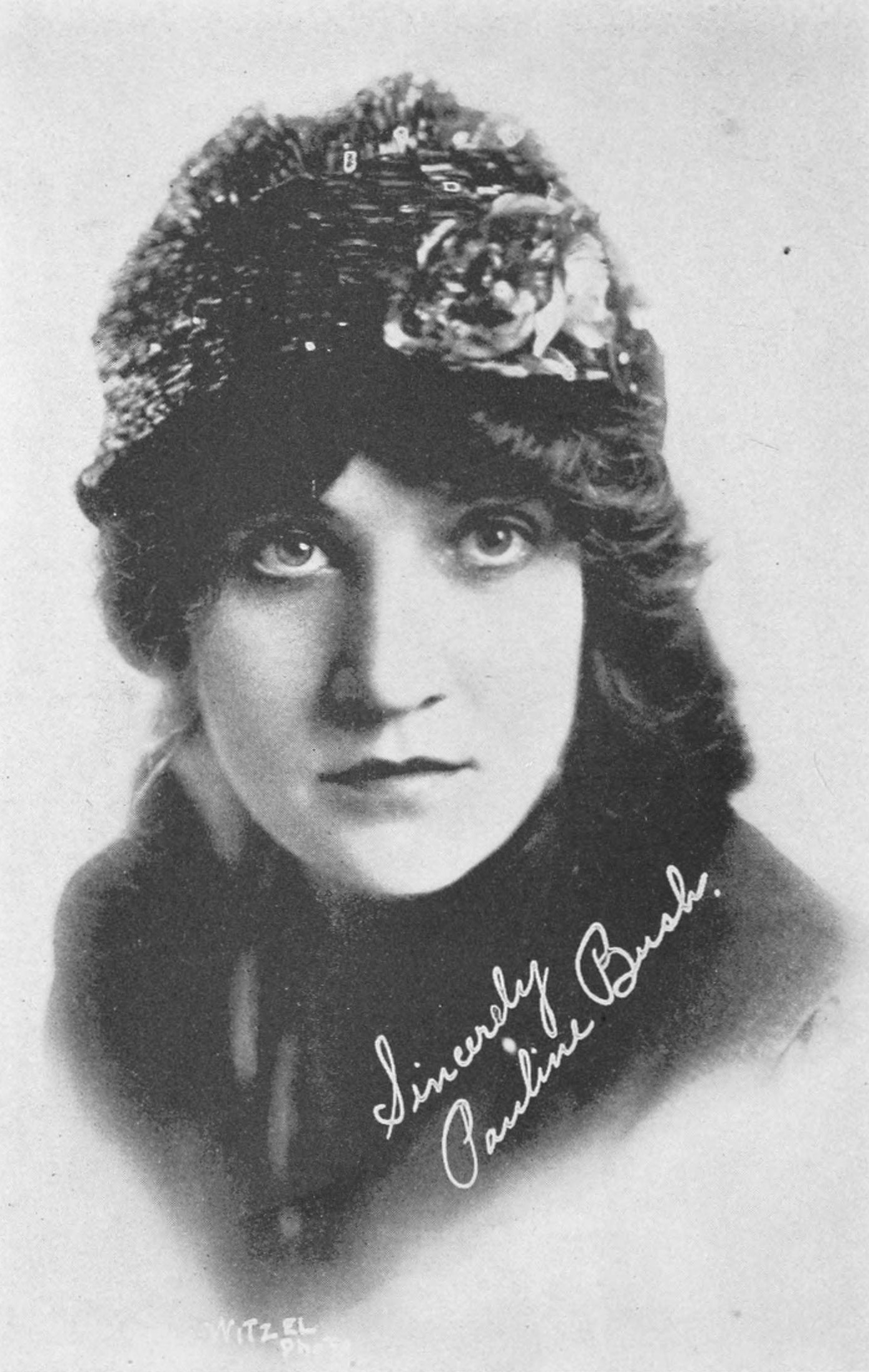
- Bush, 1915
- Born: May 22, 1886; Lincoln, Nebraska, U.S.
- Died: November 1, 1969 (aged 83); San Diego, California, U.S.
- Occupation: Film actress
- Years active: 1910–1924
- Spouse: Allan Dwan (m. 1915; div. 1919)

Pauline Elvira Bush (May 22, 1886 – November 1, 1969) was an American silent film actress. She was nicknamed "The Madonna of the Movies".

== Early years ==
Born in Wahoo, Nebraska, Bush was "brought up for the operatic stage and concert platform, [but] she preferred the stage." She studied at the University of Nebraska after attending a private school in Virginia. At Nebraska, she studied "music generally, and the piano in particular."

After she moved to Los Angeles, Bush studied expression and literature at the Cumnock Institution.

== Career ==
Early in her career, Bush was active in stock theater at the Liberty Theater in Oakland, California. Her film career began with the American Film Manufacturing Company. From 1910 to 1924, she appeared in some 250 movies, dozens of them featuring Lon Chaney.

She retired in 1916.

== Personal life ==
Bush married director Allan Dwan in 1915. They divorced in 1919. In 1928, Dwan offered a lump sum settlement of $200,000 to Bush in lieu of continuing $26,000 annual support. The Associated Press cited a story in the New York American that said that Bush had "filed a claim for $100,000 back alimony."

== Death ==
On November 1, 1969, Bush died of bronchitis and cancer in San Diego. She was 83.

== Selected filmography ==
- The Hand of Uncle Sam (1910)
- Bloodhounds of the North (1913)
- Red Margaret, Moonshiner (1913)
- "The Thief's Wife" (1913)
- Back to Life (1913)
- The Gratitude of Wanda (1913)
- The Mystery of Yellow Aster Mine (1913)
- A Night of Thrills (1914)
- The Lion, the Lamb, the Man (1914)
- Lights and Shadows (1914)
- Her Life's Story (1914)
- Virtue Is Its Own Reward (1914)
- The Pipes o' Pan (1914)
- Richelieu (1914)
- The Higher Law (1914)
- Her Bounty (1914)
- The Oubliette (1914)
- The Hopes of Blind Alley (1914)
- The Forbidden Room (1914)
- The Unlawful Trade (1914)
- The Tragedy of Whispering Creek (1914)
- The End of the Feud (1914)
- The Lamb, the Woman, the Wolf (1914)
- The Embezzler (1914)
- The Menace to Carlotta (1914)
- Discord and Harmony (1914)
- Remember Mary Magdalen (1914)
- The Honor of the Mounted (1914)
- The Lie (1914)
- Steady Company (1915)
- An Idyll of the Hills (1915)
- The Girl of the Night (1915)
- The Grind
- Maid of the Mist (1915)
- The Desert Breed (1915)
- All for Peggy (1915)
- Outside the Gates (1915)
- Where the Forest Ends (1915)
- Such Is Life (1915)
- When the Gods Played a Badger Game (1915)
- The Threads of Fate (1915)
- The Measure of a Man (1915)
- A Small Town Girl (1915)
- The Star of the Sea (1915)
- The Sin of Olga Brandt (1915)
- The Mask of Love (1917)
- The Enemy Sex (1924)
