= Steady Company (1915 film) =

1915 film

- Directed by: Joe De Grasse
- Written by: Ida May Park (screenplay); Julius G. Furthman (story)
- Starring: Lon Chaney; Pauline Bush
- Distributed by: Universal Pictures
- Release date: July 6, 1915
- Running time: 1 reel (10 minutes)
- Country: United States
- Language: Silent with English intertitles

Steady Company is a 1915 American silent short drama film directed by Joe De Grasse and featuring Lon Chaney and Pauline Bush. It was written by Ida May Park, based on a story by Julius G. Furthman. The film is now considered to be lost.

A still exists showing Lon Chaney as "Jimmy Ford", meeting Nan's parents for the first time. Historian Michael F. Blake says that the Motion Picture News stated in a review that the film was "produced by Lon Chaney", but that statement is not backed up by any other sources and is probably not true.

== Plot ==
Nan Brenner comes from a dreary home...her mother is a manly brute, and her father a henpecked alcoholic. They make a living taking in other people's washing, and her mother forces her drunken husband to physically wash the clothes for ten percent of the take, which he spends on booze. Jimmy Ford is a young strapping shipping clerk in a large warehouse, and every evening on the bus ride home, he notices Nan returning from her job in a department store. He frequently tries to strike up a conversation with her, but she is reluctant to make friends because she can't bring anyone home to meet her disgusting family members.

One day, Jimmy offers his seat to Nan, and when a laborer takes the seat first, Jimmy starts a fight and throws the laborer off the bus. As Nan gets off the bus, she sees that Jimmy has left his umbrella on the seat, and she brings it to him. Jimmy gets off with her and she agrees to share his umbrella. Nan finally relents and agrees to take a walk in the park that Sunday.

When the big day arrives, they go to the zoo where they spot some young boys teasing a drunk. Jimmy chases the boys away and offers to take the man home, but to her horror, Nan realizes the man is her father! When they arrive at her home, Nan's mother grabs the old man and drags him inside without a word of thanks to Jimmy for helping him. Nan runs to her room sobbing, fearing that Jimmy will never want to see her again now, but Jimmy knocks timidly on the bedroom door and reminds her that they still haven't finished eating their peanuts in the park. Later, in the park, Nan sobs in Jimmy's arms, and the films ends with a passionate kiss.

== Cast ==
- Pauline Bush as Nan Brenner
- Lon Chaney as Jimmy Ford
- Lydia Yeamans Titus as Mrs. Ford

== Reception ==
"A bright, pleasing subject...There is a lot of real life in this story; in spite of the girl's hard circumstances, the humorous side is always up. A good picture, full of natural, homely touches." ---Moving Picture World.

"This is one of the best one-reel comedy-dramas that we have seen for a long time. It was produced by Lon Chaney who plays one of the principal parts....the wealth of pleasingly realistic incidental touches unite to make the reel one of the most gratifying program releases." --- Motion Picture News

== See also ==
- List of lost films
