= George Cooper (actor) =

American actor (1892–1943)

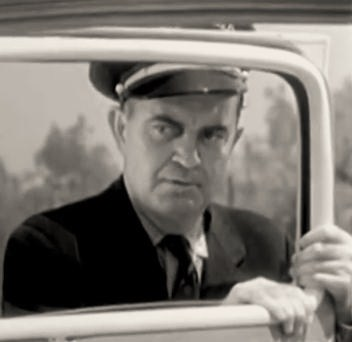
- Cooper in Sitting on the Moon (1936)
- Born: George Cooper Healey; December 12, 1892; Newark, New Jersey, U.S.
- Died: December 9, 1943 (aged 50); Sawtelle, California, U.S.
- Occupation: Actor
- Years active: 1911–1940
- Spouse: Carolina Edwina Weiss (m. 1915)
- Children: 4

George Cooper Healey (December 12, 1892 – December 9, 1943) was an American actor of the silent film era. Cooper appeared on stage first, then in 210 films between 1911 and 1940. His son George Cooper Jr. (1920–2015) was also an actor who appeared in films from 1947 until 1954.

== Selected filmography ==
- The Cross-Roads (1912, Short) as Kirke Dundee
- Bianca (1913, Short) as Beppo a.k.a. Tony
- The Night Riders of Petersham (1914) as Coke
- The Tragedy of Whispering Creek (1914, Short) as The Kid
- The Unlawful Trade (1914, Short) as Young Tate
- The Hopes of Blind Alley (1914, Short) as The Little Janitor
- Mother's Roses (1915) as Paul Hutchinson
- The Wheels of Justice (1915) as 'Red' Hall, the Burglar
- The Battle of Frenchman's Run (1915, Short) as John
- Thou Art the Man (1916) as John MacDowell
- A Night Out (1916) as Waldo Deacon
- The Hunted Woman (1916) as Mortimer Fitzhugh
- The Vital Question (1916) as Richard King
- The Suspect (1916) as Valdor
- Her Secret (1917) as Charley
- The Auction Block (1917) as Jimmy Knight
- Fields of Honor (1918) as Paul
- The Struggle Everlasting (1918) as Slimy Thing
- Her Man (1918) as Jeb Havey
- The Dark Star (1919) as Mr. Brandes
- The Birth of a Soul (1920) as Joe Barlow
- The Very Idea (1920) as Fisherman
- Chains of Evidence (1920) as George Brownlow
- The Veiled Mystery (1920)
- For Those We Love (1921) as Bert
- I Am Guilty (1921) as Dillon
- The Fox (1921) as K.C. Kid
- Turn to the Right (1922) as Mugsy
- Bow Wow (1922) as The Country Girl's Sweetheart
- The Glorious Fool (1922) as Al
- The Love Letter (1923) as Red Mike
- Suzanna (1923) as Miguel
- Quicksands (1923) as Matt Patterson
- The Shriek of Araby (1923) as Presto the Magician
- The Nth Commandment (1923) as Max Plute
- Little Church Around the Corner (1923) as Jude Burrows
- The Eternal Three (1923) as Bob Gray
- The Ghost Patrol (1923)
- Her Temporary Husband (1923) as Conrad Jasper
- Through the Dark (1924) as Travel
- No More Women (1924) as Tex
- Torment (1924) as Chick Fogarty
- Riders Up (1924) as Henry, the Rat
- Behind the Curtain (1924) as Slug Gorman
- Unmarried Wives (1924)) as Joe Dugan
- Never Say Die (1924) as Gaston Gibbs
- Smouldering Fires (1925) as Mugsy
- The Devil's Cargo (1925) as Jerry Dugan
- The Great Divide (1925) as Shorty
- Just a Woman (1925) as Oscar Dunn
- The Lawful Cheater (1925) as Johnny Burns
- The Goose Woman (1925) as Reporter
- The New Commandment (1925) as Red
- Shadow of the Law (1926) as Chauffeur
- Red Dice (1926) as Squint Scoggins
- The Barrier (1926) as Sgt. Murphy
- The Wise Guy (1926) as The Bozo
- The Unknown Soldier (1926) as Cpl. Fogarty
- Pals First (1926) as The Squirrel
- Tin Hats (1926) as 'Lefty' Mooney
- Women Love Diamonds (1927) as Snub Flaherty
- The Lovelorn (1927) as Joe Sprotte
- Rose-Marie (1928) as Fuzzy
- The Trail of '98 (1928) as Samuel Foote as The Worm
- Lilac Time (1928) as Sergeant Hawkins
- The Barker (1928) as Hap Spissel
- The Devil's Apple Tree (1929) as Cooper
- The Unholy Night (1929) as Frey as Lord Montague's Orderly
- Sailor's Holiday (1929) as Shorty
- Under a Texas Moon (1930) as Philipe
- Numbered Men (1930) as 27635
- Shooting Straight (1930) as Chick
- The Girl of the Golden West (1930) as Trinidad Joe
- Renegades (1930) as Harry A. Biloxi
- Paid (1930) as Red
- Gentleman's Fate (1931) as Mike
- Laughing Sinners (1931) as Joe
- Emma (1932) as Airfield Mechanic (uncredited)
- Sky Devils (1932) as Mitchell
- Night Court (1932) as Safecracking Thug (uncredited)
- Flames (1932) as Fishey
- Blondie of the Follies (1932) as O'Brien as Stage Manager (uncredited)
- I Am a Fugitive from a Chain Gang (1932) as Vaudevillian (uncredited)
- Forbidden Trail (1932) as Happy as Tom's Sidekick
- Uptown New York (1932) as Al
- Grand Slam (1933) as Josh (uncredited)
- Soldiers of the Storm (1933) as Red Gurney
- Mary Stevens, M.D. (1933) as Pete
- Lady for a Day (1933) as Cheesecake (uncredited)
- Wild Boys of the Road (1933) as Vagrant Near Columbus (uncredited)
- Day of Reckoning (1933) as Hospital Patient in Traction (uncredited)
- Ever in My Heart (1933) as Lefty, a Soldier (uncredited)
- Havana Widows (1933) as Paymaster Mullins
- Before Midnight (1933) as Stubby
- The Big Shakedown (1934) as Shorty
- The Personality Kid (1934) as Tiny
- Return of the Terror (1934) as Cotton
- Broadway Bill (1934) as Joe
- Murder in the Clouds (1934) as Wings Mahoney
- West of the Pecos (1934) as Wes
- Doubting Thomas (1935) as Stagehand
- Anything Goes (1936) as Steward (uncredited)
- Mr. Deeds Goes to Town (1936) as Bob (uncredited)
- Federal Agent (1936) as Agent Wilson
- The Phantom Rider (1936, Serial) as Spooky
- Missing Girls (1936) as Zig
- Sitting on the Moon (1936) as Taxi Driver
- Ride 'Em Cowboy (1936) as Chuck Morse
- Adventure in Manhattan (1936) as Duncan
- Flying Hostess (1936) as Flight Attendant (uncredited)
- We're on the Jury (1937) as Oglesby as Taxi Driver (uncredited)
- When You're in Love (1937) as Assistant Immigration Officer (uncredited)
- Step Lively, Jeeves! (1937) as Slug
- The Man Who Found Himself (1937) as Hobo (uncredited)
- That I May Live (1937) as Mack
- Riders of the Dawn (1937) as Grizzly Ike
- Think Fast, Mr. Moto (1937) as Muggs Blake
- Portia on Trial (1937) as Efe
- The Duke Comes Back (1937) as Janitor
- West of Rainbow's End (1938) as Happy
- Having Wonderful Time (1938) as Camp Maintenance Man (uncredited)
- The Chaser (1938) as Man at Calhoun's Auto (uncredited)
- The Missing Guest (1938) as 'Jake'
- Boys Town (1938) as Tramp (uncredited)
- The Mexicali Kid (1938) as Blacksmith (uncredited)
- Say It in French (1938) as Taxi Driver (uncredited)
- Sweethearts (1938) as Electrician (uncredited)
- Stand Up and Fight (1939) as (scenes deleted)
- Lucky Night (1939) as $50 Passerby (uncredited)
- They All Come Out (1939) as Prisoner (uncredited)
- Blackmail (1939) as Hawley as Released Prisoner (uncredited)
- Mr. Smith Goes to Washington (1939) as Waiter (uncredited)
- I Take This Woman (1940) as Tommy (scenes deleted)
