= The Girl of the Night =

1915 American film

- Directed by: Joe De Grasse
- Written by: Ida May Park
- Starring: Pauline Bush; Lon Chaney
- Distributed by: Universal Pictures
- Release date: April 18, 1915
- Running time: 2 reels (20 minutes)
- Country: United States
- Language: Silent with English intertitles

The Girl of the Night is a 1915 American silent crime film directed by Joe De Grasse and featuring Lon Chaney. The film is now considered to be lost. The film was re-released later as Her Chance. Director Joe De Grasse played a major role in the film, playing the attorney, Arthur Langham. A still exists showing Chaney in the role of Jerry, the petty thief.

== Plot ==
A small time crook named Jerry takes a young neighborhood girl named Nance under his wing and raises her as best he can. Nance spends her formative years living among Jerry's criminal friends, but she remains virtuous. Years later, Jerry's gang gets word that a powerful attorney named Arthur Langham is investigating them all for criminal activities, and Jerry asks Nance to steal some evidence from the attorney's home. When she goes into the lawyer's house, however, Nance is caught. Nance pleads with the lawyer to leave Jerry out of the case, explaining what a kindhearted man Jerry has always been to her. The lawyer agrees to remove Jerry from the case if she and Jerry will go straight.

As the trial date approaches, Nance overhears members of Jerry's gang plotting to murder Mr. Langham. Nance goes to the lawyer's house to warn him, but walks in on the lawyer's wife and her boyfriend Clyde Herndon, who have been carrying on an affair behind Mr. Langham's back. The two are planning to elope together, and Mrs. Langdon takes all of her jewels out of the safe. When the lawyer suddenly comes home unexpectedly, Nance takes some of the wife's jewels from her and pretends she was robbing the place, to get Mrs. Langham out of trouble with her husband. But just as Mr. Langham is getting ready to turn Nance over to the police, his wife confesses the truth to keep Nance out of trouble. Nance's stepdad Jerry confesses to her that he has fallen in love with her over the years and asks her to marry him. Mrs. Langham gives Nance some money to help her to go straight, and Nance and Jerry go off to start a new life together.

== Cast ==
- Pauline Bush as Nance
- Lon Chaney as Jerry, a small time hood
- Joe De Grasse as Arthur Langham, the attorney
- Hylda Hollis (credited as Hilda Sloman) as Mrs. Enid Langham
- ?? as Clyde Herndon

== Reception ==
"This is well photographed and worked out quite strongly. It is a drama of motives and appeals to the sympathies, thought it is not in every way a finished production." – Moving Picture World

"The story of these two reels is presented in a wonderfully gripping manner. All the scenes are effectively worked out and the spectator finds himself wrapped up in the story from the start. Lon Chaney has a small part as a crook who reforms and finally wins the girl." – Motion Picture News
