= The Grand Passion =

1918 film

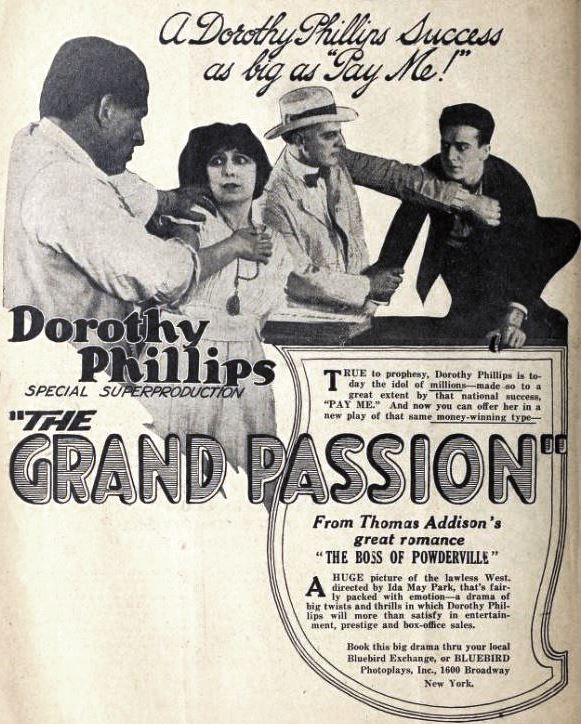
- Trade advertisement
- Directed by: Ida May Park
- Written by: Ida May Park
- Based on: The Boss of Powderville by Thomas Addison
- Produced by: Jewel Productions
- Starring: Dorothy Phillips; Lon Chaney
- Cinematography: King D. Gray
- Distributed by: Universal Pictures
- Release date: February 1, 1918
- Running time: 7 reels (70 minutes)
- Country: United States
- Languages: Silent; English intertitles

The Grand Passion is a 1918 American silent Western film directed by Ida May Park and starring Dorothy Phillips, Jack Mulhall, and Lon Chaney. Ida May Park also wrote the screenplay, based on a novel The Boss of Powderville by Thomas Addison. The film was allegedly shown in some theaters under the title of The Boss of Powderville.

Jack Mulhall later co-starred again with Lon Chaney in Danger - Go Slow (1918) and Flesh and Blood (1922). Some sources claim the film's running time was closer to an hour, but we'll never know because it is considered a lost film. A still from the film exists showing Lon Chaney being strangled by members of a mob.

The distributor suggested a strange publicity stunt to advertise the film, explaining to exhibitors "Send an auto through the streets with a woman and two evil looking men; the woman should have her head muffled, and be forcibly restrained from jumping out. And on the back of the car have a sign, "For the reason for this abduction see THE GRAND PASSION at the ____________ theatre today.".

== Plot ==
Dick Evans, the boss of Powderville, decides to start a newspaper called The Trumpet and support it through coerced advertising from all of the businesses in the town. He hires Jack Ripley, a New York newspaperman, to be its editor. Evan's sworn enemy is a man called Paul Argos. Argos' niece, Viola, comes to Powderville to find her uncle and arrives on the same train as Jack Ripley.

Ripley saves her from being assaulted by a Chicago thug called Red Pete Jackson. Paul Argos thanks Ripley, but then learns that Ripley has come to town to work for his enemy, Dick Evans. After developing a romantic relationship with Viola, Dick Evans decides to follows Ripley's suggestion and use the power of his newspaper to clean up the criminal elements in the town and start a charity hospital. Unbeknownst to Evans, Ripley has also fallen in love with Viola.

Meanwhile, Viola has been kidnapped by Red Pete Jackson's gang and hidden away in Boston Kate's brothel on the other side of the tracks. Evans and Ripley team up and rescue her but, in so doing, they accidentally start a fire in the brothel and incur the wrath of the kidnappers. The criminals attack the town and set fire to the newspaper office and, in the face of defeat, Evans orders Ripley and Viola to leave him and escape before the fire reaches the town's ammunition dump. Evans is shot during the ensuing chaos, and Viola's uncle Paul Argos has his place of business destroyed in the fire and goes insane with fear.

Viola later leaves Ripley and returns to what remains of the burnt out town, where she discovers Evans has been fatally wounded. She declares her love for Evans, but he dies in her arms, telling her he loved her.

== Cast ==
- Dorothy Phillips as Viola Argos
- Jack Mulhall as Jack Ripley
- William Stowell as Dick Evans
- Bert Appling as Red Pete Jackson
- Lon Chaney as Paul Argos
- Evelyn Selbie as Boston Kate
- Alfred Allen as Ben Mackey

== Reception ==
"If gunplay, mob stuff and exceptional lightings were the principal ingredients of a motion picture, then THE GRAND PASSION...would rank with the highest, for these ingredients it has in great abundance. Unfortunately, however, these elements so profusely employed do not serve to tell a story clearly and straight-forwardly...Dorothy Phillips, William Stowell, Lon Chaney and Jack Mulhall do their best with roles that have not been properly characterized by the scenarist." --- Motion Picture News.

"The picture is fairly riotous with action, and might be depressing except for the fact that there is so much humor scattered through it." ---Moving Picture World

"It is much too long and the story extremely draggy...It needs most of all to be retitled and about 2,000 feet eliminated from the running." ---Variety

== Censorship cuts ==
Like many American films of the time, The Grand Passion was subject to cuts by city and state film censorship boards. For example, the Chicago Board of Censors required cuts, in Reel 1, of Pete lunging at reporter with knife, women in background being pulled over the balustrade, two views of young women dancing on platform, Reel 2, two scenes of Pete throwing Paul across table, young women throwing arms around Dick's neck, Reel 3, view of dance hall as seen by young woman looking through widow, putting intoxicated woman into taxicab, Reel 4, shooting man through window, woman doing wiggle dance on platform, two intertitles "I've come for her to kill if she's been wronged" and "Shoot the word around", all scenes of young women in Boston Kate's house after the intertitle "Thank God, a woman" to include all scenes of Kate and her locking door, Reel 5, the intertitle "She's at Boston Kate's in the valley", two scenes of young woman in room looking at barred window, all scenes of man in hall and at young woman's door, two scenes of Viola at window in gown falling from shoulders, woman shooting Dick, printer shooting Pete, three scenes of women rushing down street, Reel 6, two scenes of women rushing down street, two dance hall scenes at beginning of reel, all scenes of women and men in automobile carrying torches to include the intertitle "To the jail, we'll turn Red Pete loose", all scenes of riot in street showing rioters shooting and people falling to include killing of boy, man falling at crossing and dragging the body away, and the intertitle "You're marked. Good-night for Red Pete."
