= When a Girl Loves =

When a Girl Loves may refer to:

- When a Girl Loves (1919 film), an American silent film directed by Phillips Smalley and Lois Weber
- When a Girl Loves (1924 film), an American silent film directed by Victor Halperin
