= If My Country Should Call =

1916 film

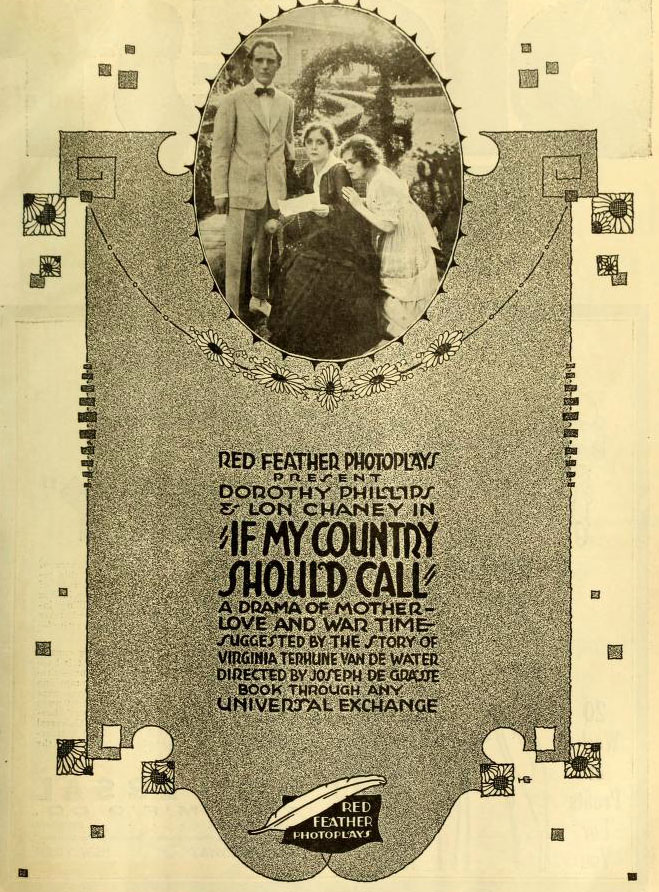
- Directed by: Joe De Grasse
- Written by: Ida May Park (screenplay); Virginia Terhune Van de Water (story)
- Produced by: Red Feather Photplays
- Starring: Dorothy Phillips; Lon Chaney; Jack Nelson
- Cinematography: King D. Gray
- Distributed by: Universal Pictures
- Release date: September 25, 1916
- Running time: 5 reels (50 minutes)
- Country: United States
- Language: Silent with English intertitles

If My Country Should Call is a 1916 silent drama film directed by Joe De Grasse and starring Lon Chaney, Jack Nelson and Dorothy Phillips. The film was written by Ida May Park, based on a story by Virginia Terhune Van de Water. The film's theme was very topical at the time, since many American men were then signing up to fight in World War I and Mexico.

The film survives incomplete at the Library of Congress and the National Archives of Canada/Ottawa. Only reels 2, 3 and 5 survive of the five original reels. The incomplete print, along with an incomplete print of another 1916 Chaney film, The Place Beyond the Winds were found in the Dawson Film Find in 1978.

== Plot ==
The wealthy Margaret Ardrath's husband Robert enthusiastically goes off to war in Europe at the breakout of World War I, upsetting Margaret immensely. But when she learns her son Donald is planning to enlist in the armed forces to fight the Mexican army down at the border, she decides she has to take matters into her own hands. Margaret steals a small bottle of a heart depressant from the medical bag of Dr. George Ardrath while he leaves it unattended. She begins slipping very small doses of the medication into her son's drinks, which causes him to develop a slight heart murmur, so that he will not be able to qualify to join the army as he had planned.

After the military rejects him, however, the young man develops other medical problems which causes his fiancé to leave him, and he becomes an alcoholic. When the doctor discovers the vial missing from his medical bag, Donald realizes what his mother has done to him (although it was for his own good), and he hates her for it. Margaret suddenly receives a telegram that her husband was killed in Europe, and overwhelmed by grief, she takes a drug overdose to kill herself. Suddenly, she wakes up and realizes it was all just a bad dream.

== Cast ==
- Dorothy Phillips - Margaret Ardrath
- Jack Nelson - Donald
- Lon Chaney - Dr. George Ardrath
- Helen Leslie - Patricia Landon
- Frank Whitson - Robert Ogden
- Albert MacQuarrie - Col. Belden
- Carl von Schiller - Zuroff
- Gretchen Lederer - Mrs. Ardrath
- Clyde Benson
- Gordon Griffith

== Reception ==
"This rather harrows the feelings at times, but it is modern and dramatic. It presents problems that have been threshed out in the hearts of many women during the past two years. The presentation is acceptable throughout. The cast is pleasing." --- Moving Picture World

"The biggest fault of this offering is the lack of any dominating personality, and there is no character which holds the sympathy perfectly." --- Wid's Film Daily
