= Paid in Advance =

1919 film by Allen Holubar

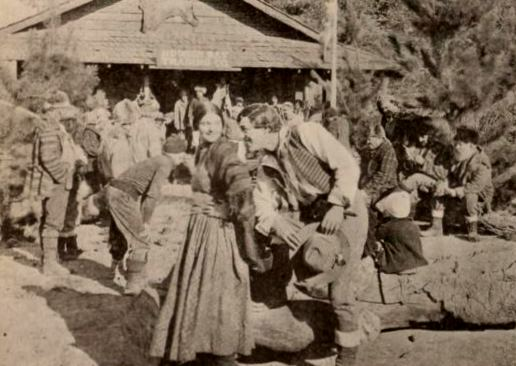
- Film still
- Directed by: Allen Holubar
- Screenplay by: Allen Holubar
- Based on: The Girl Who Dared by James Oliver Curwood
- Produced by: Jewel Productions
- Starring: Dorothy Phillips; Joseph W. Girard; Lon Chaney; Priscilla Dean
- Cinematography: King D. Gray
- Edited by: Grant Whytock
- Production company: Universal Film Manufacturing Company
- Distributed by: Universal Film Manufacturing Company
- Release date: September 1, 1919
- Running time: 6 reels (60 minutes)
- Country: United States
- Language: Silent (English intertitles)

Paid in Advance is a 1919 American silent drama film set during the Alaska Gold Rush, from the story The Girl Who Dared by James Oliver Curwood. The film was directed by Allen Holubar, who wrote the screen adaption as well. The movie stars Dorothy Phillips, Joseph W. Girard, Lon Chaney, and Priscilla Dean.

A still exists showing the lead heroine holding Bateese Le Blanc (Lon Chaney) at gunpoint. A nitrate stock print (with Czech subtitles) is housed at the Czech Film Archive in Prague, Czech Republic.

== Plot ==
John Gray, an old fur trapper, lives with his beautiful daughter Joan in the Canadian Northwest. Bateese Le Blanc, a half-breed, forces his attentions on Joan whenever he gets a chance, but is constantly watched by his jealous half-breed sweetheart, Marie. "Gold Dust" Barker and his henchman, Regan, convince John Gray to return to the Yukon with them as head trapper, and they offer his daughter Joan work as a nurse. The trip to Dawson City is a grueling one, and Joan finds her father dead one morning.

Arriving in Dawson City, Joan learns that Gold Dust Barker is the proprietor of the dance hall, and all his girls are called "nurses." Jim Blood owns the richest mine in the area, but he is only a shell of a man, overcome by alcoholism. Bateese arrives in town and breaks into Joan's room. Jim Blood comes to her rescue, and Bateese is killed in the ensuing gunfight.

Deciding there is only one hope for escape from this life, Joan puts on a flashy dance costume, rushes on stage, and offers herself in marriage to the highest bidder. Jim Blood offers his entire claim and wins Joan, but as a Justice of the Peace is about to marry them, Barker and Regan present a fake $100,000 I.O.U. from Jim, and they abduct Joan as their payment. Jim grabs two guns, holds the dance hall crowd at bay, and frees Joan.

Barker and Regan fire at Jim, but he is a fast draw and shoots both men. He fires at a lamp, setting the building on fire. While the crowds flee for their lives, Jim tells Joan that he really loves her, then he vanishes off into the night. Joan returns to her old home in Montreal, and receives regular payments from the manager of the mine that she won from Jim. She is called to Dawson City on business, and meets the manager, only to learn that the manager is none other than Jim. Having kicked his drinking problem, the two are happily united.

== Cast ==
- Dorothy Phillips as Joan Gray
- Joseph W. Girard as John Gray
- Lon Chaney as Bateese Le Blanc
- Priscilla Dean as Marie
- William Stowell as Jim Blood
- Frank Brownlee as Gold Dust Barker
- William Burress as Regan
- Harry De More as Flap Jack

== Reception ==
"A melodramatic story of the Klondike portrayed in a faithfully realistic manner by a cast of clever principals and an army of extra people...Virile action, many thrilling fights, and a neat little love element is interwoven in the story. Excellent photography is displayed on the many splendid exterior scenes." ---Motion Picture News

"Pictorial effects and characterizations by Lon Chaney, Priscilla Dean, and William Stowell give most of whatever entertainment value there is to PAID IN ADVANCE...The picture comes to life in the scenes in which they appear. ---The New York Times

"A splendid dramatic success is achieved in this six-reel Universal-Jewel production... The cast, so far as the principals are concerned, is made up entirely of screen favorites, and so excellent is the team work of these tried players that the numerous tense situations are raised to extreme dramatic heights." ---Moving Picture World

"Dance hall meller that misses because of story weaknesses and ancient situations...Lon Chaney's good."---Wid's Film Daily
