= Bondage (1917 film) =

- Directed by: Ida May Park
- Written by: Ida May Park (screenplay); Edna Kenton (story)
- Starring: Dorothy Phillips; Gretchen Lederer; Gertrude Astor
- Cinematography: King D. Gray
- Production company: Universal Pictures
- Distributed by: Universal Pictures
- Release date: October 17, 1917
- Running time: 5 reels (50 minutes)
- Country: United States
- Languages: Silent; English intertitles

Bondage is a 1917 American silent drama film written and directed by Ida May Park (based on the story by Edna Kenton), and starring Dorothy Phillips, William Stowell, Gretchen Lederer and J.B. MacLaughlin.

Many sources over the years, including the authoritative Michael F. Blake book, have listed Lon Chaney as appearing in the film in an uncredited capacity, but Chaney historian Jon Mirsalis states, "There is no evidence to support that claim. The formal documents submitted to the U.S. Copyright Office do not list Chaney in the cast, nor do the cast lists submitted to trade publications such as Moving Picture World. None of the reviews of the time mention Chaney. Recent texts attribute Chaney to the role of "the seducer," but reviews of the time confirm that this part was played by J. B. McLaughlin. How this enormous piece of misinformation began is a mystery." Photos exist showing the cast members, but in all of them, Chaney is conspicuously absent.

== Plot ==
Country girl Elinor Crawford has always had great literary ambitions but so far has advanced no further than a reporter for a New York scandal sheet. During an assignment, she meets a lawyer from her hometown named Evan Kilvert, who is shocked at her Bohemian way of life. Elinor scorns him and turns her affections to Bertie Vawtry, the editor of a racey weekly newspaper. Vawtry professes to love her, but when he suddenly goes off and marries a wealthy widow, Elinor leaves town and everyone assumes that she ran off with Vawtry. Lawyer Kilvert finds her living homeless in the streets and he marries her.

Soon after, Elinor returns to one of her old haunts where she meets Vawtry, whose wife has by this time passed away. Vawtry tries once again to seduce her, but although Elinor spurns his advances, her husband sees them talking and suspects that she has been seeing Vawtry behind his back. Seeing that her husband doesn't trust her, she leaves him. Kilvert, later learns that his wife was indeed faithful to him all along, finds her in the street in a state of depression and brings her back home. He then finds her would-be seducer and administers a vicious beating to the knave.

== Cast ==
- Dorothy Phillips as Elinor Crawford
- William Stowell as Evan Kilvert, Elinor's husband
- J.B. MacLaughlin as Bertie Vawtry, the seducer
- Gretchen Lederer as Francesca Taft
- Gertrude Astor as Eugenia Darth
- Jean Porter as Jean
- Eugene Owen as James
- Lon Chaney as "The Seducer"?? (unconfirmed)

== Reception ==
Motion Picture News opined "(Ida May Park) has turned out a most skillful piece of work in every department. Bondage has more than the usual share of dramatic moments. It is told clearly and concisely." (Notice there is no mention of Lon Chaney in the review.)

== Bibliography ==
- Langman, Larry. American Film Cycles: The Silent Era. Greenwood Publishing, 1998.
