= The Price of Silence (1916 film) =

1916 film

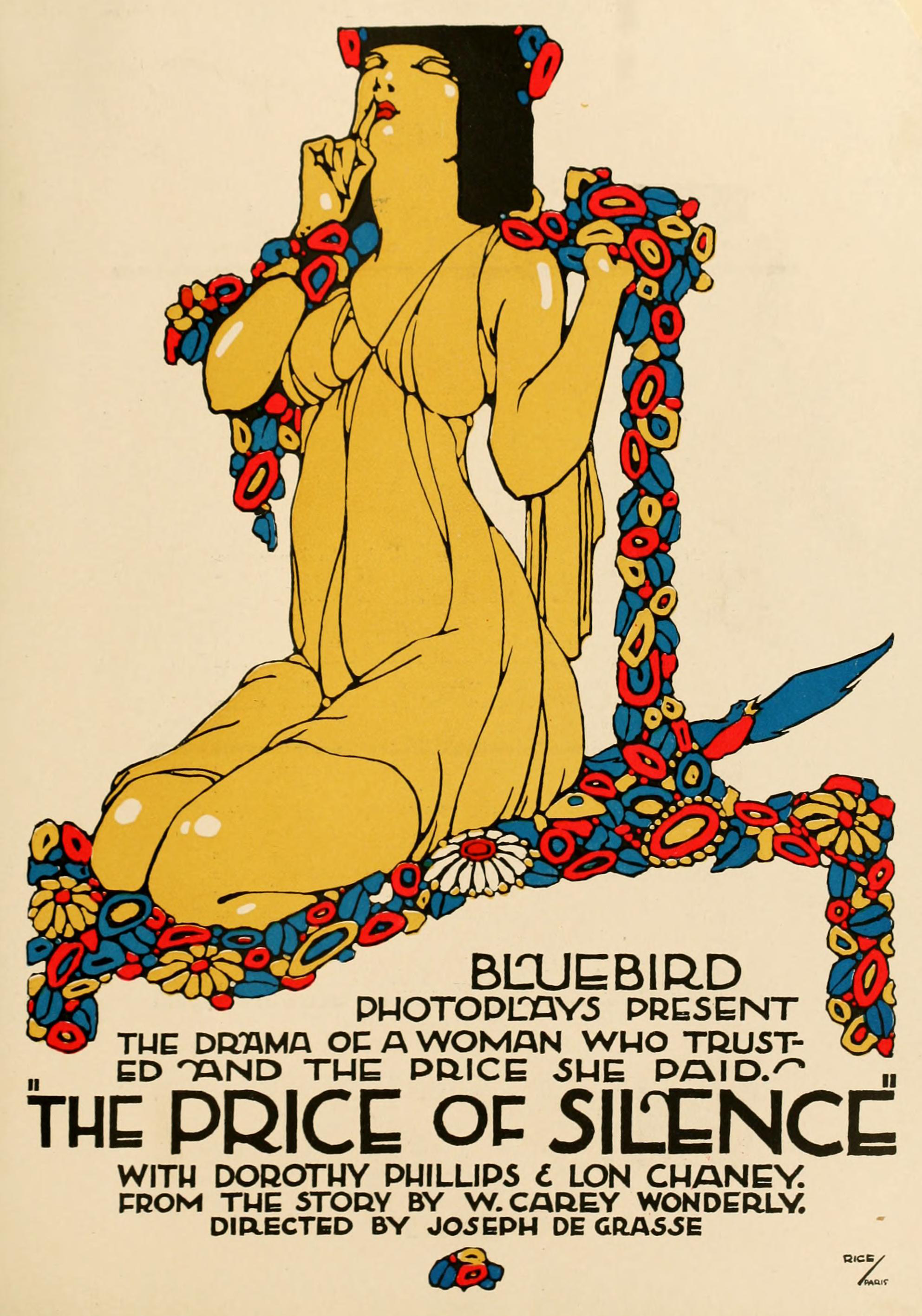
- Theatrical poster
- Directed by: Joe De Grasse
- Written by: Ida May Park (screenplay)
- Story by: W. Carey Wonderly
- Produced by: Bluebird Photoplays
- Starring: Dorothy Phillips; Lon Chaney; Jack Mulhall
- Cinematography: King D. Gray
- Distributed by: Universal Pictures
- Release date: December 11, 1916
- Running time: 5 reels (50 minutes)
- Country: United States
- Language: Silent (English intertitles)

The Price of Silence is a 1916 American silent drama film directed by Joe De Grasse and starring Lon Chaney. The screenplay was written by Ida May Park, based on the short story by W. Carey Wonderly. A print is housed at the French archive Centre national du cinéma et de l'image animée in Fort de Bois-d'Arcy. A still also exists showing Chaney in his role of the blackmailing Dr. Stafford. There were four other silent films entitled The Price of Silence, but this was the only one released in 1916.

== Plot ==
After committing a minor misdeed, Helen, an orphan living with her aunt and her cousin Emily, is sent to the suburbs to live with a very strict family. She falls in love with a man named Ralph Kelton, and while riding in the countryside one day, a great storm comes up and they are forced to take refuge in an old man's house. Planning to be married the following day, the two spend the night together. But soon after they have sex, Ralph is killed by a bolt of lightning that strikes the house. Dr. Stafford is summoned, and Helen happens to mention to the doctor that she and Ralph were not married (not realizing she is now pregnant).

Helen returns home and plans to marry a young millionaire named Oliver Urmy, but she soon discovers she is pregnant. When Oliver and his father must travel out of state for a time, Helen moves in with her old nurse. She gives birth to a son, who she leaves in the care of her nurse's daughter Jenny, since Jenny is married and is able to raise the child. Oliver returns and marries Helen unaware that she has given birth, and the following year, Helen gives birth to Oliver's daughter named Arline. Helen's cousin Emily has married, but her husband has died, so Helen and Oliver set out to find her a new husband.

Skip ahead seventeen years. Arline, now a mature teenager, is in love with Billy Cupps. Helen fears that Billy Cupps is her own son (Ralph Kelton's offspring), which would make him Arline's half-brother! Oliver invites Dr. Stafford to visit them, planning to get him romantically interested in Emily. Dr. Stafford immediately recognizes Helen, but she does not remember him. Instead of courting Emily, Dr. Stafford wants to marry Helen's daughter Arline instead, and threatens Helen with exposure unless she consents to their marriage. Arline instead elopes with Billy Cupps, and Oliver receives a letter from Arline saying she and Billy were married, and he and Dr. Stafford set out after her.

During the drive, Stafford makes insinuations about Helen, enraging Oliver. Oliver loses control of the car when he physically attacks the doctor. When the car crashes, Stafford is killed and Oliver is injured. Jenny tells Helen that her son had died as a baby a short time after she adopted him, and fearing the loss of the money Helen was sending her every month, Jenny had substituted a child of her own without telling Helen. Helen finds him to be a fine lad, and welcomes him as her son-in-law.

== Cast ==
- Dorothy Phillips as Helen Urmy
- Lon Chaney as Dr. Edmond Stafford
- Jack Mulhall as Ralph Kelton
- Frank Whitson as Oliver Urmy
- Evelyn Selbie as Jenny Cupps
- Jay Belasco as Billy Cupps
- J. Edwin Brown as Landlord (credited as Eddie Brown)
- Vola Vale as Aline

== Reception ==
"The Price of Silence, while it is a well-made production, is unfortunately based on an unpleasant theme, presenting situations that are tense and undeniably dramatic, but at the same time vesting certain characters with unheroic temperments, where actions reflecting moral heroism would be more liable to excite sympathy...Considerable is made in the production of bedroom and undress scenes; more in fact than would give the production a place among films for young people." ---Moving Picture World

"The (film) is not for that sort of an audience (puritanical). Which of course doesn't mean the picture is void of value. Quite the opposite. It is full of value for the exhibitor who caters to a group of people who are inclined to look for peppers and spices in their entertainment.... Lon Chaney is polished as the villain, obviously villainous."
