= Triumph (1917 film) =

1917 film

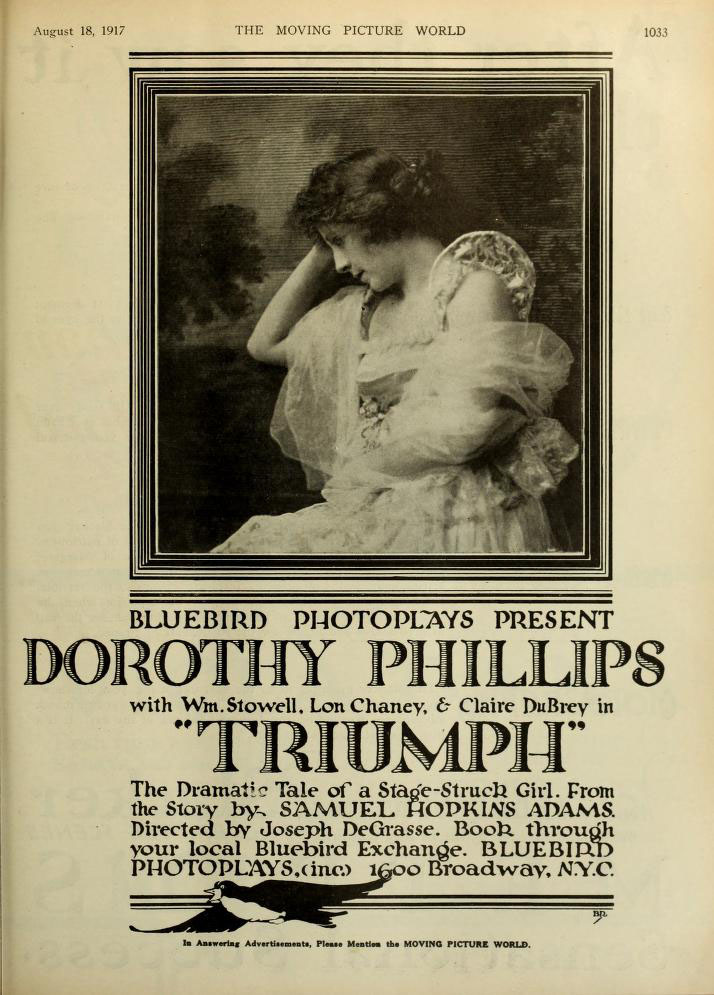
- Advertisement for film
- Directed by: Joe De Grasse
- Written by: Fred Myton (screenplay); Samuel Hopkins Adams (story)
- Produced by: Bluebird Photoplays
- Starring: Lon Chaney; Dorothy Phillips; Claire Du Brey
- Cinematography: King D. Gray
- Distributed by: Universal Film Manufacturing Company
- Release date: September 3, 1917
- Running time: 5 reels (50 minutes)
- Country: United States
- Language: Silent (English intertitles)

Triumph is a 1917 American silent drama film directed by Joe De Grasse, written by Fred Myton, starring Lon Chaney and Dorothy Phillips. The screenplay was adapted from a short story by Samuel Hopkins Adams. It was produced by Bluebird Photoplays and released by Universal Film Manufacturing Company. Only the first three of the five reels of this film survive, and the third reel is heavily decomposed. Two stills exist showing Lon Chaney as the terminally ill Paul Neihoff (see plot).

Like many American films of the time, Triumph was subject to cuts by city and state film censorship boards. The Chicago Board of Censors required cuts in Reel 3 of intertitles "What did you pay him?" and "If you haven't paid him yet, you will;" in Reel 4 intertitles "Its not done in these days, you pay for what you get" and "Your triumph or Paul Neihoff's?"... all scenes between man and girl where she seems to assent to his indecent proposals, and the scene showing the actual stabbing of Mr, Monteith; and in Reel 5 the scenes of the suicides of both Neihoff and Nell.

== Plot ==
Nell Baxter, an aspiring actress, decides to leave her hometown and go to Broadway where she has been told she will surely triumph as a great star. At the train station, she meets a troupe of road-show actors and becomes friendly with Dudley Weyman, one of the actors. He urges her not to move to the big city, but she does not heed his advice and soon finds herself stranded in Manhattan without employment.

Nell is hanging around a Broadway theatre looking for work, when she is spotted by Dudley Weyman who introduces her to the theatre manager. Dudley not only gets her a part in the show, but he soon falls in love with her, although Nell feels only friendship for him. The manager, David Montieth, is also attracted to Nell, but she only has eyes for Paul Neihoff, an unemotional drama critic who only cares about getting his play produced. Playing on her affections, Neihoff gets Nell to entice Mr. Montieth into reading his play by coming on to him. Montieth, thinking Nell is in love with him, agrees to produce Paul's play and gives Nell the lead role in it.

Another actress, jealous of the attention Nell is getting, purposely allows Mr. Montieth to see Nell and Neihoff in a romantic embrace in Nell's dressing room. In a rage, Montieth announces that he will not produce the play, and he knocks Neihoff down on the floor. Nell goes to Mr. Montieth's apartment to plead with him not to cancel the production. He tries to rape her, and she stabs him to death with a prop knife.

She gives Neihoff and Dudley the news and Neihoff tells them both to go on with the show as if nothing happened. It seems Neihoff's doctor had told him earlier that week that he is terminally ill, so the dying critic writes a fake confession to Monteith's murder and then poisons himself. Nell learns during the intermission how Neihoff lied to protect her from a murder rap. Nell goes on stage for the final scene in which she is to stab herself, and instead of using the fake dagger, she plunges a real dagger into her heart, dying in Dudley's arms.

The scene suddenly flashes back to the train station where Dudley is telling Nell the story of another girl named Nell whom he once loved. As the train pulls away, Nell decides to remain in her small town and forego moving to the big city.

== Cast ==
- Dorothy Phillips - Nell Baxter
- Lon Chaney - Paul Neihoff
- William Stowell - Dudley Weyman
- William Dyer - David Montieth (credited as William J. Dyer)
- Claire Du Brey - Lillian Du Pon
- Clyde Benson - Rupert Vincent
- Helen Wright - Character Woman
- Ruth Elder - Second Woman
- Nigel De Brulier (uncredited)
- William Langdon Pragen (uncredited)

== Preservation ==
The three surviving reels of Triumph (Reels 1, 2 and 3) were restored by the Academy Film Archive in 2012. Most of the third reel was very decomposed. The 4th and 5th reels no longer exist.

== Reception ==
"The audience is cheated at the beginning of the story within a story...The tragic story within the story would make a very good photoplay without the outside story." ---Moving Picture World

"The finish is altogether unexpected because the visualization of the actor's narration is not suggested in any way and its enactment is vivid and stirring. A very good program feature." ---Variety

"This is a picture of stage life and possesses more than the usual attraction of such productions due to its artistic and tasteful direction... The production is realistic from start to last." ---Motion Picture News

== See also ==
- List of incomplete or partially lost films
