= Hell Morgan's Girl =

1917 film

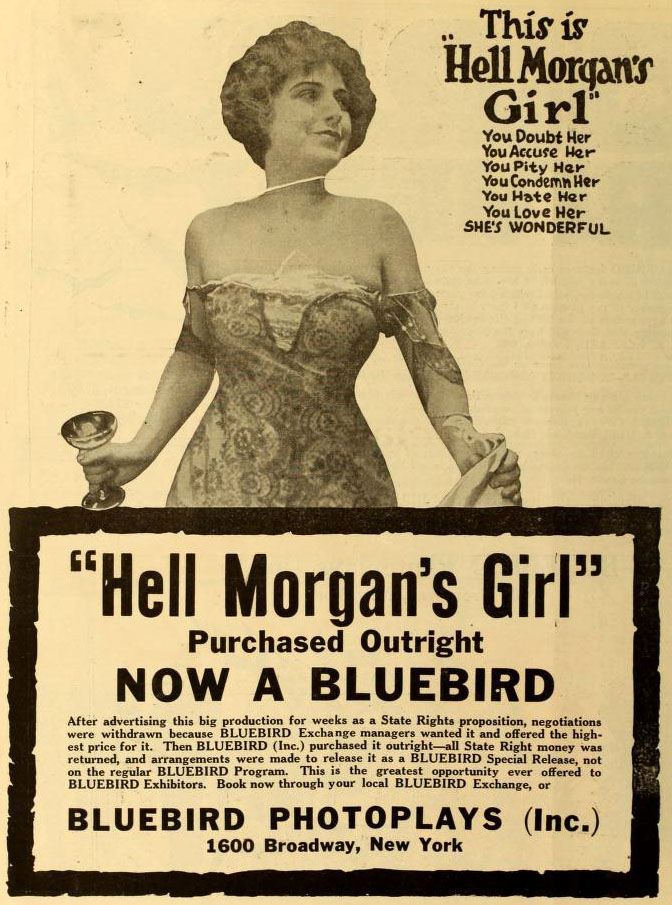
- Advertisement (1917)
- Directed by: Joe De Grasse
- Screenplay by: Ida May Park
- Story by: Harvey Gates
- Starring: Dorothy Phillips; Lon Chaney; William Stowell
- Cinematography: King D. Gray
- Production company: Bluebird Photoplays
- Distributed by: Bluebird Photoplays
- Release date: March 5, 1917
- Running time: 5 reels (50 minutes)
- Country: United States
- Language: Silent (English intertitles)

Hell Morgan's Girl is a 1917 American silent drama film directed by Joseph De Grasse, and starring William Stowell, Dorothy Phillips and Lon Chaney. The screenplay was written by Ida May Park, based on the Harvey Gates story entitled The Wrong Side of Paradise, which was the film's working title. The film's tagline read: "This is "Hell Morgan's Girl". You Doubt Her. You Accuse Her. You Pity Her. You Condemn Her. You Hate Her. You Love Her. SHE'S WONDERFUL!"

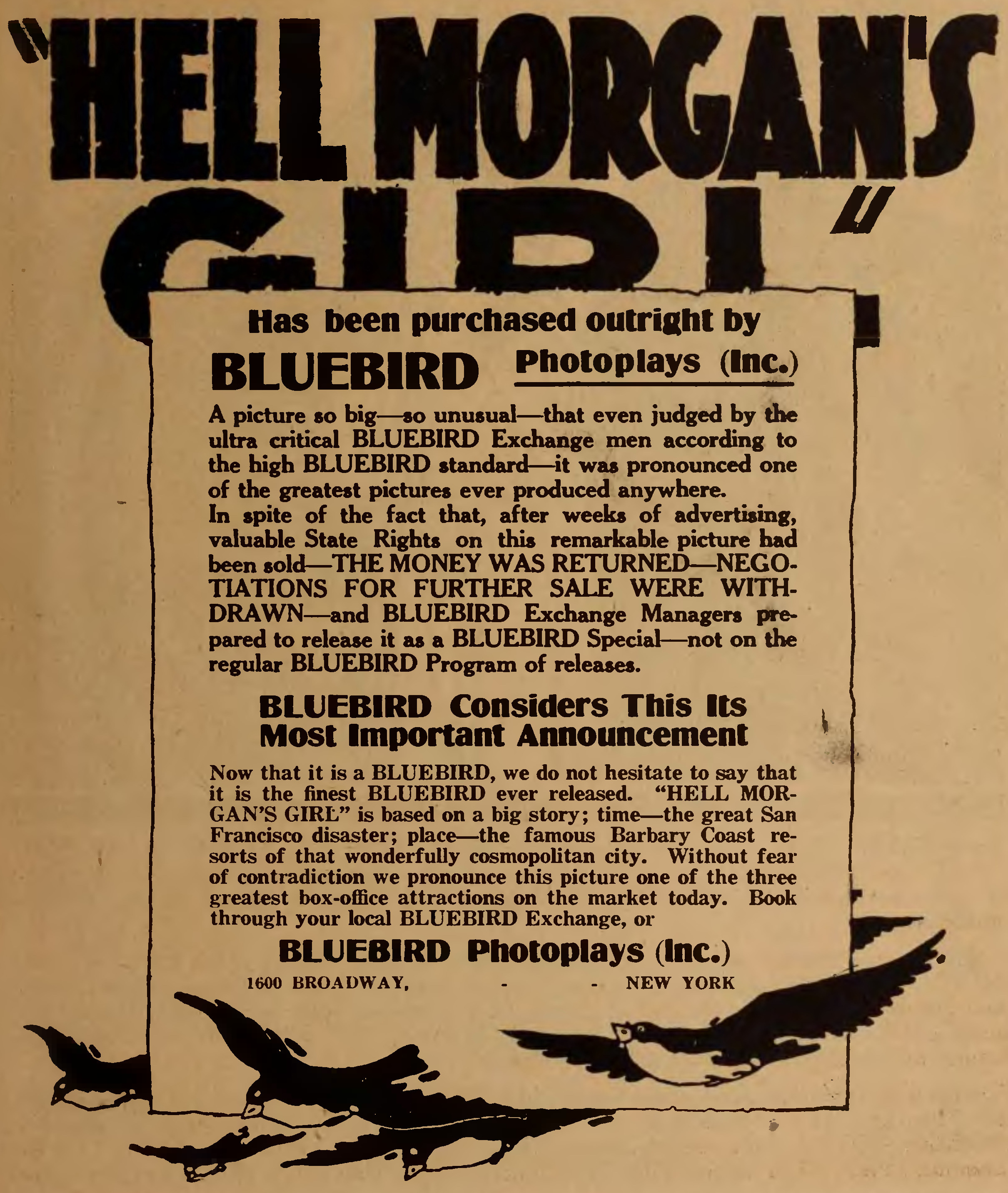
Movie ad, Bluebird Photoplays, Inc. in Moving Picture Weekly, 1917

The film made a profit of $450,000 and is today thought to be lost. A still exists showing Lon Chaney in the role of the villainous Sleter Noble.

== Plot ==
The action takes place in 1906 San Francisco. Roger Curwell aspires to be an artist, an ambition at odds with the wishes of his wealthy father. Cast out by his father, he soon falls on hard times. His ex-model Olga had been interested in him because she thought he would some day inherit his father's millions, but when he is cast out penniless, she deserts him.

In a Barbary Coast saloon called "The Sailor's Rest" which is run by Hell Morgan, he is rescued from a beating by Lola Morgan, Hell's daughter. She gives him a job as a piano player, he paints her portrait, and a romance evolves between them. A tough politician named Sleter Noble is also interested in Lola, but has been rebuffed by her.

Olga, formerly a model for Roger, finds him and tells him that his father has died and made him a millionaire. Olga tries to rekindle her relationship with Roger and comes onto him. Angered on seeing Roger with Olga, Lola leads Noble on, but then regrets doing so and tries to distance herself from him. Noble threatens to shoot Roger if Lola doesn't agree to become his woman. When he hears his daughter screaming. Lola's father comes to her aid and is shot by Noble just as the famous earthquake hits. Sleter Noble is shot dead in the melee. Lola manages to get her wounded father out of the building by way of a fire escape. In the aftermath of the disaster, Hell Morgan dies of his injuries, and Lola and Roger are reunited.

== Cast ==
- Dorothy Phillips as Lola
- William Stowell as Roger Curwell
- Lon Chaney as Sleter Noble
- Lillian Rosine as Olga (credited as Lilyan Rosine)
- Joseph W. Girard as Oliver Curwell
- Alfred Allen as Hell Morgan

== Reception ==
The New York Daily Mirror opined: "It is no exaggeration to place Hell Morgan's Girl among the best five-reel melodramatic photoplays of the year. The action is fast and furious... If an exhibitor wishes to have a thrilling melodrama, he could not do much better than to book Hell Morgan's Girl."

Wid's Film Daily stated "As a characterization study, this will rank very high. Being an underworld theme, it will be exceptionally interesting to many."

Moving Picture World said "We could not recommend it...for exhibition before refined audiences or before children; for while it may be a perfect typification of that hole of vice, the realism of its staging makes it the more unwholesome. Those looking for maudlin types will be attracted to the picture, for it abounds in them."

Motography opined: "It will be found too rough for fastidious patrons, unless they are in the mood for a slumming expedition. However, the picture is really less suggestive than many polite society dramas. Its very frankness and force keep it from being salacious...It is well acted and well produced."

Photoplay reviewer Julian Johnson stated: "Worked successfully: a rich man's son, disowned by his father because he refuses to forsake art for business, fails to make art go, and becomes a multiple-reel drunkard. His redemption must [be met] by a bad woman, according to the formula, or at least by a woman who has the externals of wickedness. Keep your eyes on Dorothy Phillips, the temperamental eyeful who plays Lola. She is coming up like a Fourth-of-July rocket, and if her crude talent is properly developed, she will be a supreme mistress of melodrama."

Variety said "...the scenes depicting life in Frisco just prior to the earthquake rank with the best of that sort of motion picture work. The 'dive' stuff is so vivid that its realism is positively startling."

== Censorship ==
Before Hell Morgan's Girl could be exhibited in Kansas, the Kansas State Board of Review required the shortening of all dance hall scenes and elimination of women smoking and drinking.
