= William Stowell =

William Stowell may refer to:

- William Hendry Stowell (1800-1858), English nonconformist minister
- William R.R. Stowell (1822-1901), American Mormon pioneer and Utah War participant
- William H.H. Stowell (1840-1922), American politician representing Virginia, later industrialist in Wisconsin and Minnesota
- William Stowell (actor) (1885-1919), American silent film actor
