= Edna Kenton =

American writer and literary critic

- portrait of Edna Kenton by Carl Van Vechten, 1938
- Born: Edna Baldwin Kenton; March 17, 1876; Springfield, Missouri, U.S.
- Died: February 28, 1954 (aged 77)
- Education: Drury College, University of Michigan
- Occupations: Author, Suffragist
- Notable work: The Book of Earths

Edna Kenton (March 17, 1876 – February 28, 1954) was an American writer and literary critic. Kenton is best remembered for her 1928 work The Book of Earths, which collected various unusual and controversial theories about a hollow earth, Atlantis, and similar matters.

== Early life and education ==
Edna Baldwin Kenton was born in Springfield, Missouri in 1876. Her father, James Edgar Kenton, was a bookkeeper. She attended Drury College, as did her brother Maurice and her sister Mabel, and graduated from the University of Michigan in 1897. She worked in Chicago as a young woman, where she knew Theodore Dreiser.

== Career ==
Kenton's first novel, What Manner of Man (1903), was published while she was still in her twenties. A second, Clem, followed in 1907. Later she concentrated on essays and short stories, as a contributor to Harper's Magazine, Century Magazine, Virginia Quarterly Review, and other periodicals. She also served on the advisory board of The Seven Arts, a short-lived but influential literary magazine. Kenton wrote some important criticism of Henry James, especially her essay "Henry James to the Ruminant Reader" (1924), which introduced a novel reading of The Turn of the Screw. Her last publication was an edited collection of Henry James stories.

She is credited with writing the screenplay for the silent film Bondage (1917), directed by Ida May Park and starring Dorothy Phillips.

Kenton was an active suffragist and a charter member of Heterodoxy, a feminist debating club based in Greenwich Village. She served on the executive board of the Provincetown Players, led by fellow Heterodites Eleanor Fitzgerald and Susan Glaspell, and wrote a history of the company, published many years later. She also wrote a biography of her kinsman, frontiersman Simon Kenton, and several books based on the letters of Jesuit missionaries in North America. But it was The Book of Earths (1928), her collection of esoteric theories about a hollow earth, Atlantis, ancient maps, and similar topics, that found the most enthusiastic and lasting readership, and continues in print.

== Personal life ==
Edna Kenton died in 1954, age 77; author Leon Edel eulogized her in the New York Times. A small collection of her papers is at Columbia University.
