= Fires of Rebellion =

1917 film

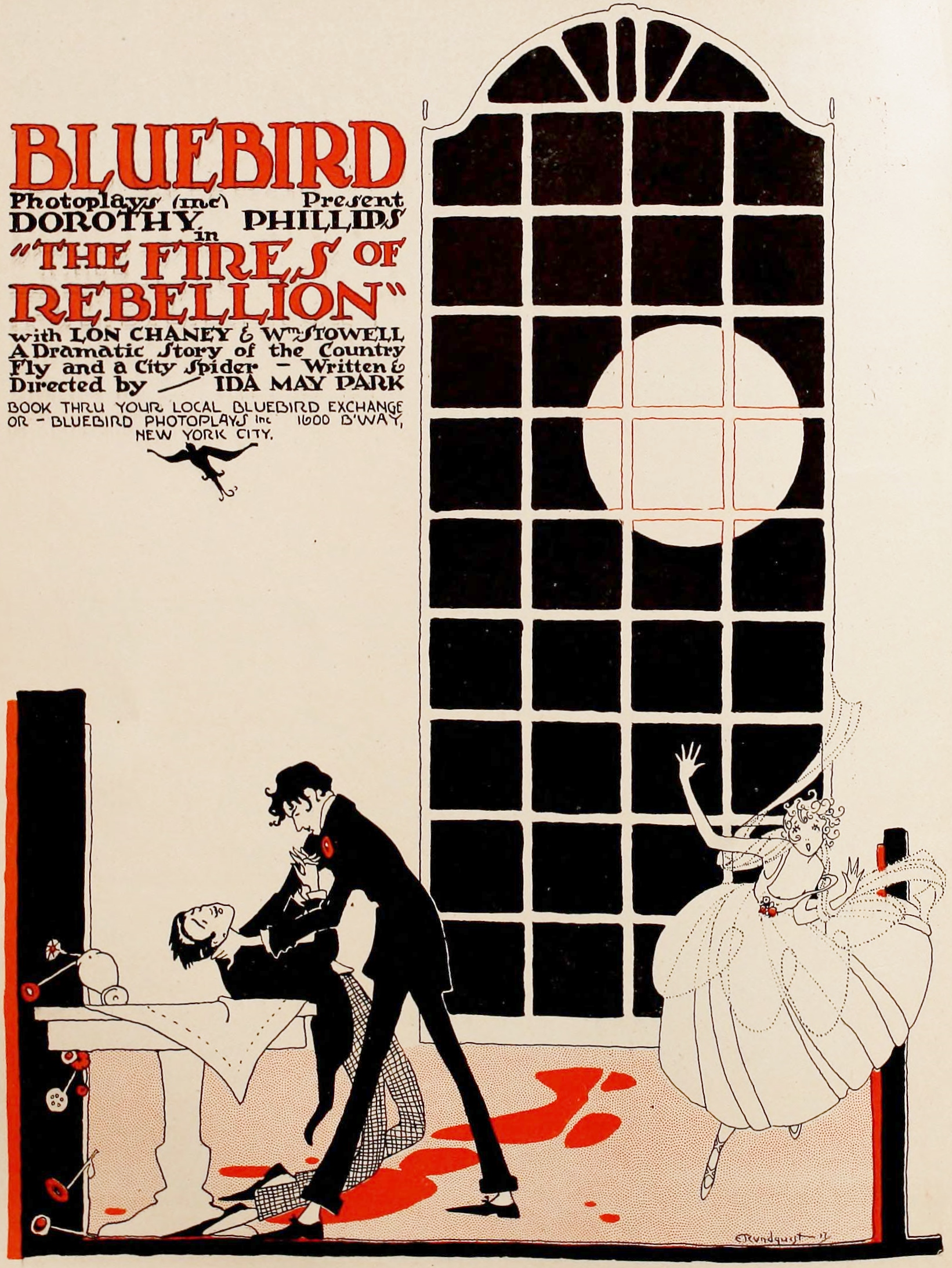
- Directed by: Ida May Park
- Screenplay by: Ida May Park
- Story by: Ida May Park
- Starring: Lon Chaney; Dorothy Phillips
- Cinematography: King D. Gray
- Production company: Bluebird Photoplays
- Distributed by: Universal Pictures
- Release date: July 2, 1917
- Running time: 5 reels (50 minutes)
- Country: United States
- Language: Silent (English intertitles)

Fires of Rebellion is a 1917 American silent drama film written and directed by Ida May Park, and starring Lon Chaney, William Stowell, and Dorothy Phillips. The film is today considered lost. A still exists showing Lon Chaney in the role of the lecherous photographer Russell Hanlon. The film's main musical theme was Serenade (6/8 Andantino) by R. Czerwonky.

== Plot ==
Madge Garvey and her alcoholic father are employed in a shoe factory. Madge's brother-in-law is fired by the new foreman, John Blake, and in a fistfight with Blake, he is killed. It is later determined he died of a heart attack and not a blow from Blake. Madge's sister now must give birth to a child without a husband to support them.

Blake falls in love with Madge and she consents to marry him. But the day before the wedding, she goes off to New York City, lured by a girlfriend/ stenographer named Cora Hayes and a desire to get away from Sackville and its squalor. She takes the money she would've spent on her wedding gown, along with money from her sister's insurance payment, and runs away to the big city.

There she finds life very different, getting a job as a sexy undergarment model. Desperate for money, Madge agrees to be painted in a disgracefully sexy advertisement for women's underwear. In the meantime, Blake assists Madge's mother and sister in her absence, since her drunken father has died, and the family moves into the house Blake had originally furnished for himself and Madge. Seeing a photo of a half-naked Madge in the newspaper, Blake heads off to the big city to try to bring Madge back home to Sackville with him.

Madge is posing for a vile lingerie artist named Russell Hanlon, and gets invited to his apartment late one night where he tries to force his attentions on her. Blake gets there just in time to see Madge unconscious in Russell Hanlon's arms. He rescues her and they return home and get married.

== Cast ==
- Dorothy Phillips as Madge Garvey
- William Stowell as John Blake
- Lon Chaney as Russell Hanlon
- Belle Bennett as Helen Mallory
- Golda Madden as Cora Hayes
- Alice May Youse as Mrs. Garvey
- Edward Brady as Dan Mallory
- Dick La Reno as Joe Garvey (credited as Richard La Reno)

== Reception ==
"Dorothy Phillips has been seen to better advantage than as Madge Garvey in this late Bluebird offering...The action moves swiftly without a perceptible break in its continuity. The cast is well chosen. Lon Chaney gives a good characterization." --- Motion Picture News

"The manufacturer of lingerie (Chaney) is an old hand at snaring such innocent birds and works his scheme so successfully that the timely arrival of the foreman is the only thing that saves the model from the usual consequences of such affairs...The scenes before Madge goes to the city are the best and most novel in the story. What follows is the customary list of misfortunes for the poor girl away from home. There is not a shadow of doubt that the characters in (the film) are taken from life. The production is satisfactory." --- Moving Picture World

== Censorship ==
Like many American films of the time, Fires of Rebellion was subject to cuts by city and state film censorship boards. The Chicago Board of Censors required two cuts in the film, the first removing an intertitle in reel 1 reading "Never mind, my fine lady, you won't be so fresh this time tomorrow night," and the second in reel 5 removing a closeup of a strangulation scene. The Kansas State Board of Review required the removal of a scene where John and father joke about sister's baby, all closeup scenes of drinking, the shortening of all drinking scenes in reels 4 and 5, and the final struggle scene.
