= The Mark of Cain (1916 film) =

1916 film

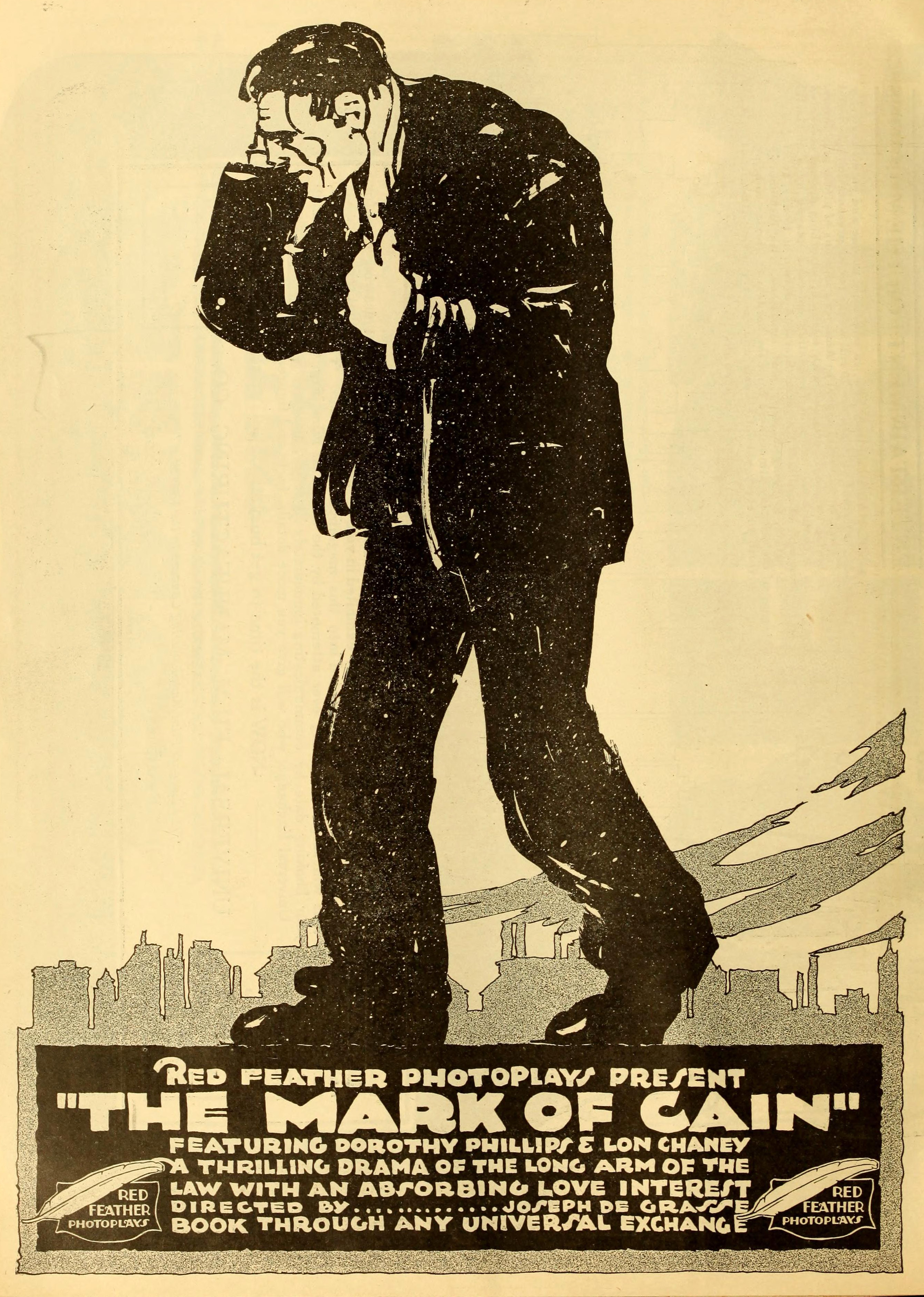
- Directed by: Joe De Grasse
- Written by: Stuart Paton
- Produced by: Red Feather Photoplays
- Starring: Lon Chaney; Dorothy Phillips
- Cinematography: King D. Gray
- Distributed by: Universal Pictures
- Release date: August 7, 1916
- Running time: 5 reels (50 minutes)
- Country: United States
- Language: Silent with English intertitles

The Mark of Cain is a 1916 American silent lost film directed by Joe De Grasse, written by Stuart Paton, and starring Lon Chaney and Dorothy Phillips. The film's tagline was "A Thrilling Drama of the Long Arm of the Law With an Absorbing Love Interest". The film's working title was By Fate's Decree.

Chaney received first billing in this film for the first time in his career. A still exists showing Lon Chaney as "Dick Temple" skulking guiltily in the background in an office scene.

== Plot ==
Dick Temple is serving a five-year prison sentence because he took the blame for a robbery his father committed. His father promises to go straight, but the old man dies two years later, before he can reveal Dick was innocent. Doris is a young woman who is forced to steal by her uncle Jake until one night when she leaves home. Dick is released on parole, but is unable to locate his mother or find a job. Afraid that her uncle might track her down, Doris decides to drown herself in the river. She is rescued by Dick who came down to the river for the same purpose, and they quickly become friends.

One day Doris rescues a baby from the burning house of Mr. and Mrs. Wilson, and the Wilsons hire her as a nursemaid to the child. Dick, deciding to steal to get money for food, is caught snatching a watch from John Graham, but rather than turn him in, Graham gives Dick a job as bookkeeper in his stock broker company A detective calls on Graham to warn him that Dick is an ex-con out on parole. Mr. Graham is in reality the head of a gang of thieves, and he tells Dick that he will tell Doris of his sordid past if Dick does not help him rob the Wilson home. Doris' uncle Jake has meanwhile tracked her down, and forces her to help him rob the Wilsons.

The night of the robbery, Doris is alone with the elderly housekeeper when Dick arrives. She confesses everything about her criminal past to Dick, but he tells her he loves her anyway. Suddenly Dick recognizes the old housekeeper is his mother, and he decides to thwart both groups of crooks that are planning to rob the Wilsons. Dick and Doris each give Uncle Jake and Mr. Graham their prearranged "all clear" signals, and when the two gangs enter the house at the same time, a fight ensues in which Uncle Jake is killed and Mr. Graham seriously wounded. Before dying, Graham confesses that Dick had nothing to do with the planned robbery, and the police release him. Dick confesses his criminal past to Doris and they decide to get married.

== Cast ==
- Lon Chaney as Dick Temple
- Dorothy Phillips as Doris
- Frank Whitson as John Graham
- Gilmore Hammond as Jake
- T. D. Crittenden as Mr. Wilson
- Gretchen Lederer as Mrs. Wilson
- Lydia Yeamans Titus as Dick's Mother
- Mark Fenton as Dick's Father
- Georgia French as Baby Wilson
- J. H. Gilmour

== Reception ==
"The story would have been much more effective if it had not been given such a sordid atmosphere throughout. The friendship of the two unfortunates appeals to the sympathies, but the picture, as a whole, has an unpleasant effect. Some of the construction is also weak and unconvincing. The subject is hardly up to Red Feather standards." --- Moving Picture World

"This picture is not up to Red Feather plays. It contains incredible incidents and coincidence plays a very strong part in places. It will please the less critical." --- Motion Picture News
