= A Doll's House (1917 film) =

1917 film directed by Joe De Grasse

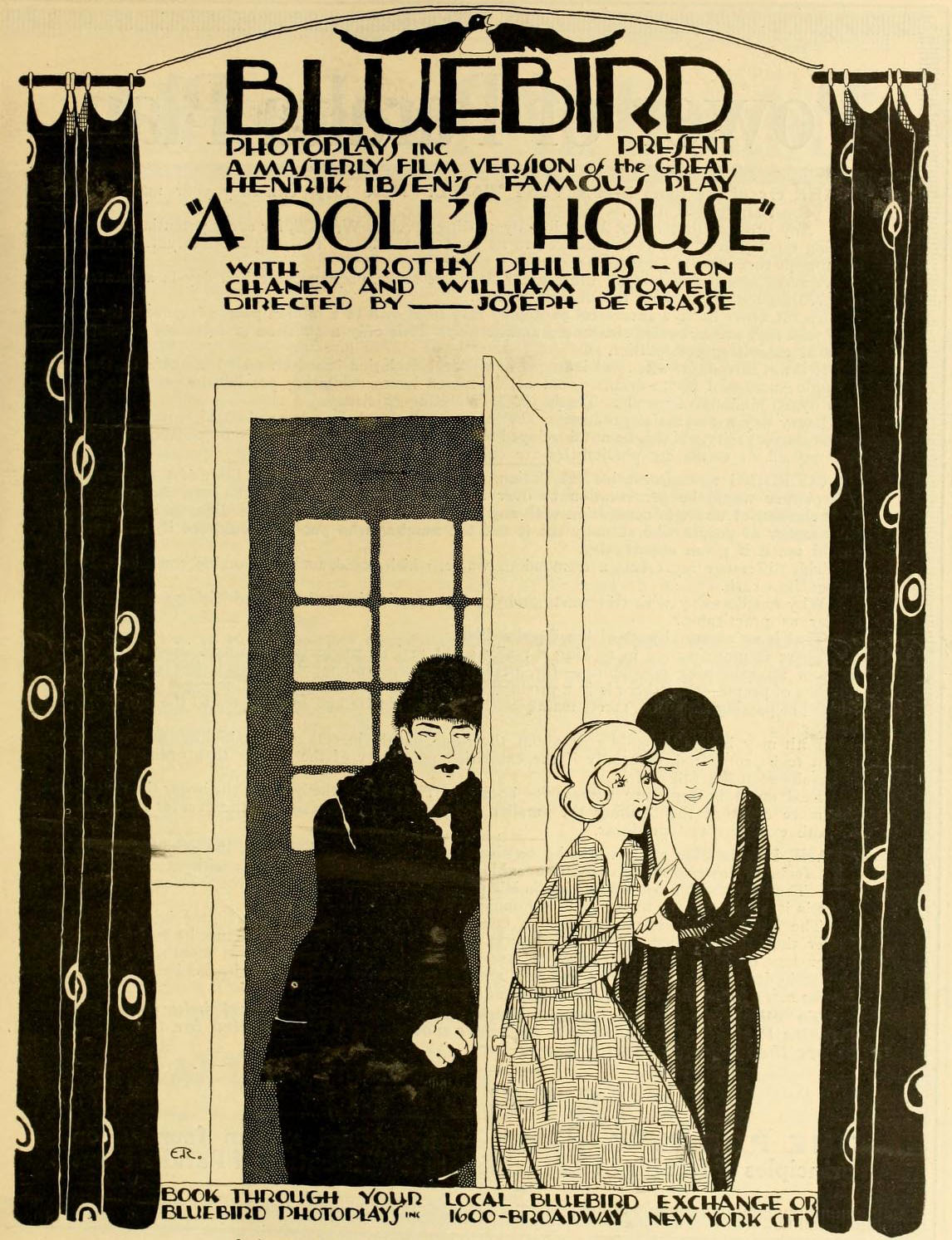
- Film poster
- Directed by: Joe De Grasse
- Written by: Joe De Grasse
- Based on: A Doll's House by Henrik Ibsen
- Produced by: Bluebird Photoplays
- Starring: Lon Chaney; Dorothy Phillips
- Cinematography: King D. Gray
- Distributed by: Universal Pictures
- Release date: June 11, 1917
- Running time: 5 reels (50 minutes)
- Country: United States
- Language: Silent with English intertitles

A Doll's House is a 1917 American silent drama film based on the eponymous 1879 play by Henrik Ibsen (original title: Et dukkehjem/ A Doll House). The film was written and directed by Joe De Grasse, and stars Lon Chaney, William Stowell and Dorothy Phillips. Film historian Jon C. Mirsalis stated that director De Grasse's wife Ida May Park wrote the screenplay, but most sources attribute both the writing and directing of the film to De Grasse himself. The film is today considered lost.

The film did not do well with the critics, who called it stagy and disappointing. Chaney's performance as the blackmailing Krogstad was singled out as brilliant, however. A still exists showing Chaney in the role of Krogstad. Two other silent film versions of the Ibsen play were produced, released in 1911 and 1918 respectively.

== Plot ==
Nora Helmer has years earlier committed a forgery in order to save the life of her authoritarian husband Torvald Helmer, a well-to-do bank manager. Her husband had become very ill, and the only thing that could save him was an operation in Italy. Unbeknownst to Torvald, Nora forged a check from her father's checkbook in order to get the money to send him there, aided and abetted by a crooked moneylender named Nils Krogstad who worked as a clerk in her husband's bank.

Now she is being blackmailed by Krogstad, and lives in fear of her husband's finding out what she did, and of the shame such a revelation would bring to his career. Soon after, her husband catches Krogstad embezzling bank funds and fires him. Krogstad threatens to expose Nora if she does not help him to get his job back, but Nora persuades her husband to give Korgstad's job to a needy widow named Christina Linde instead.

In retaliation, the moneylender tells Nora's husband everything. Even though Nora committed the forgery to save her husband from death, he still becomes enraged and cannot find it in himself to forgive her. He lectures her mercilessly until, in the end, Nora winds up leaving him in hopes of finding a better life elsewhere.

== Cast ==
- Dorothy Phillips as Nora Helmer
- William Stowell as Torvald Helmer
- Lon Chaney as Nils Krogstad
- Sydney Deane as Dr. Rank
- Helen Wright as Anna
- Myriam Shelby as Christina Linden

== Reception ==
"As a means of popular entertainment it is doubtful that the screen version of A DOLL'S HOUSE...will become much of a success. The absence of the theatrical in the Ibsen method and the difficulty of conveying the fine shades of meaning in the dialogue without the aid of speech render the task of the actors in the cast doubly hard...The Helmer of William Stowell, the Krogstad of Lon Chaney, the Dr. Rank of Sydney Deane, the Christina of Miriam Shelby and the Anna of Helen Wright are all worthy of praise." --- Moving Picture World

"Bluebird's production of Henrik Ibsen's play A Doll's House turns out to be a dramatically fine piece of work in every respect...(It) is more likely to win new audiences than to swell the old ones." --- Motion Picture News
