= The Bar C Mystery =

1926 film

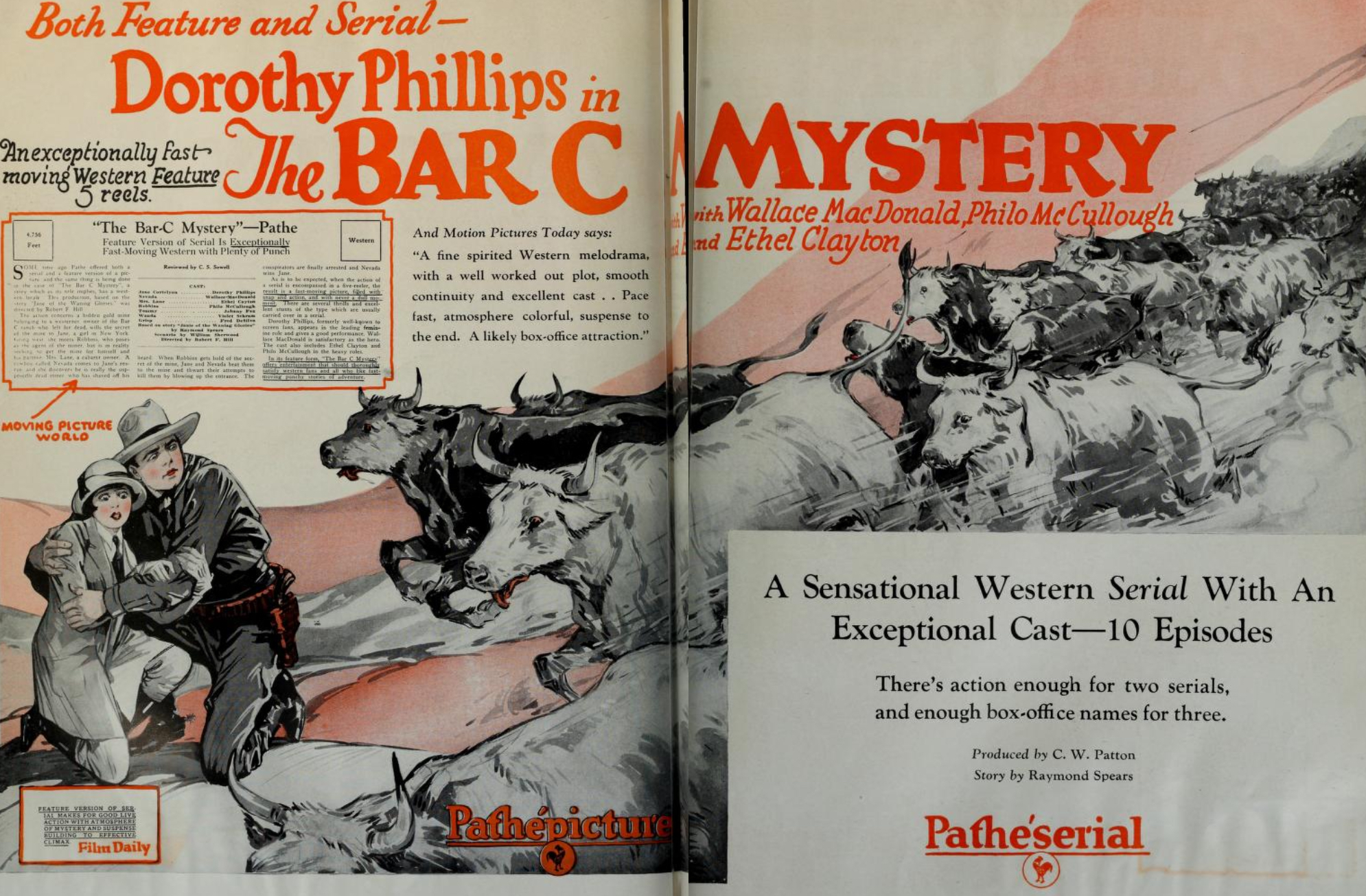
- Directed by: Robert F. Hill
- Written by: William Sherwood; Raymond Spears
- Produced by: C.W. Patton
- Starring: Dorothy Phillips; Wallace MacDonald
- Distributed by: Pathé Exchange
- Release date: April 25, 1926
- Running time: 10 episodes
- Country: United States
- Language: Silent (English intertitles)

The Bar C Mystery is a 1926 American silent Western film serial directed by Robert F. Hill. It is now considered to be lost.

== Cast ==
- Dorothy Phillips as Jane Cortelyou
- Wallace MacDonald as Nevada
- Ethel Clayton as Mrs. Lane
- Philo McCullough as Robbins
- Johnny Fox as Tommy
- Violet Schram as Wanda
- Fred DeSilva as Grisp
- Julie Bishop (as Jacqueline Wells)
- Billy Bletcher
- Jim Corey
- Al Hart
- Fred Kohler
- Tom London
- Francis McDonald
- Victor Potel

== Chapter titles ==
1. A Heritage of Danger
2. Perilous Paths
3. The Midnight Raid
4. Wheels of Doom
5. Thundering Hoofs
6. Against Desperate Odds
7. Back from the Missing
8. Fight for a Fortune
9. The Wolf's Cunning
10. A Six-Gun Wedding

== See also ==
- List of American films of 1926
- List of film serials
- List of film serials by studio
- List of lost films
