= The Sporting Chance =

1925 film

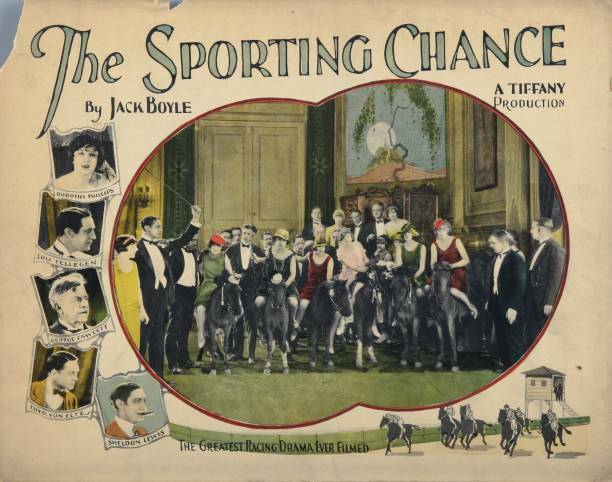
- Lobby card
- Directed by: Oscar Apfel
- Written by: John P. Bernard
- Story by: Jack Boyle
- Starring: Lou Tellegen; Dorothy Phillips; George Fawcett
- Cinematography: Desmond O'Brien
- Edited by: Harry Jackson
- Production company: Tiffany-Stahl Productions
- Distributed by: Tiffany Pictures
- Release date: July 21, 1925
- Running time: 70 minutes
- Country: United States
- Language: Silent (English intertitles)

The Sporting Chance is a 1925 American silent drama film directed by Oscar Apfel and starring Lou Tellegen, Dorothy Phillips, and George Fawcett.

== Plot ==
As described in a film magazine review, when Darrell Thornton rejects the attentions of her wealthy Northerner admirer, she learns that her sweetheart, a Southerner, is in danger of having his race horse attacked by the Sheriff for his debts. The Northerner is willing to keep the horse from being attacked and keep the Southerner from jail if Miss Thornton will be his bride. She makes the promise to marry the Northerner. However, after the race horse has been smuggled onto the race track and hitched to an ice cream truck, it wins the race, recovering enough prize money to stay the debts. Patricia is now free to reject her suitor and marry the Southerner.

== Cast ==
- Lou Tellegen as Darrell Thornton
- Dorothy Phillips as Patricia Winthrop
- George Fawcett as Caleb Winthrop
- Theodore von Eltz as Robert Selby
- Sheldon Lewis as Michael Collins
- Andy Clark as Jockey
- Oscar Apfel
- Toy Gallagher

== Censorship ==
Before The Sporting Chance could be exhibited in Kansas, the Kansas Board of Review required the removal of drinking scenes and the scene where an old man is looking at a woman's hose while she is riding a horse.

== Bibliography ==
- Ken Wlaschin. Silent Mystery and Detective Movies: A Comprehensive Filmography. McFarland & Co., 2009. ISBN 978-0-7864-4350-5
