= The Girl in the Checkered Coat =

1917 film

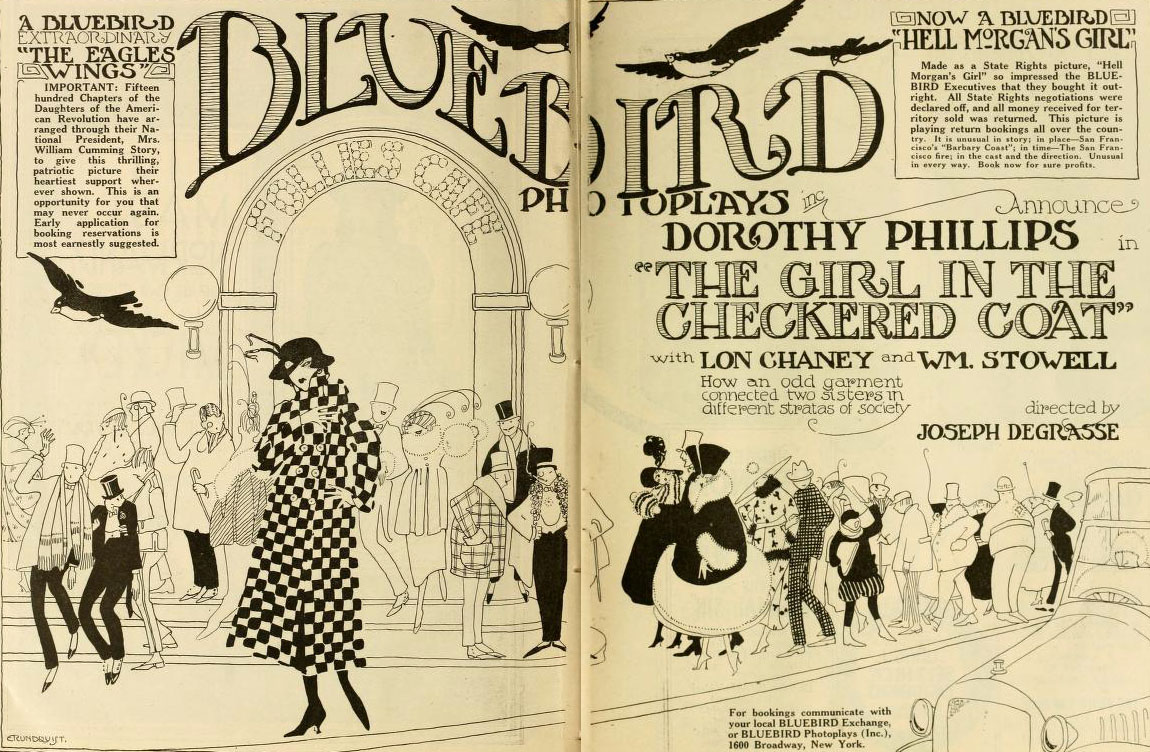
- Directed by: Joe De Grasse
- Written by: Ida May Park; E. Magnus Ingleton
- Produced by: Bluebird Photoplays
- Starring: Lon Chaney; Dorothy Phillips; William Stowell
- Cinematography: King D. Gray
- Distributed by: Universal Pictures
- Release date: April 23, 1917
- Running time: 5 reels (50 minutes)
- Country: United States
- Languages: Silent; English intertitles

The Girl in the Checkered Coat (aka The Girl With the Checkered Coat) is a 1917 American silent drama film directed by Joe De Grasse and starring Lon Chaney, Dorothy Phillips and William Stowell. It was written by Ida May Park, based on the short story by E. Magnus Ingleton. The film today is considered lost. A still exists showing Lon Chaney in the role of Hector Maitland.

== Plot ==
Two sisters, Mary and Fannie Graham, are forced to live with their criminal father when their kindly mother dies. Mary flees, but Fannie remains with her father and is raised as a thief, changing her name to "Flash" Fan. One day Fan and her accomplice, Jim, steal a purse and she uses the money to buy a checkered coat. She ditches the purse, so when a detective detains her, he has no evidence on which to hold her. Mary, who is working as a shopkeeper, becomes ill and is taken to her tenement home where, coincidentally, Flash Fan also lives. That evening, Flash steals a silk bag from a woman on the street. Fan is chased by a detective to her house, where she slips into Mary's room, finds her unconscious on the floor, and puts the checkered coat by Mary. The detective finds Mary, recognizes the distinctive coat worn by the thief he was pursuing, and arrests the girl.

David Norman, an attorney for the poor, decides to defend Mary, and she is readily found innocent. Mary and David become close friends, and David introduces her to Ann Maitland, a wealthy spinster, who makes Mary her ward. Hector is unnerved by his aunt's affection for Mary, for he fears he may lose the fortune he is expecting to inherit some day. After catching her at some petty thievery, Hector persuades Fan to help him get rid of Mary by framing her for another theft. David exposes Fan as the real thief and turns her over to the police.

Time passes, and the checkered coat has been pawned from one owner to another. Fan, destitute and shivering in the cold, finds the coat in a trash can and places it over her frail shoulders. Mary and David, now happily married, pass by the poor woman on the street and, not recognizing her, place a coin in her trembling hand.

== Cast ==
- Dorothy Phillips as Mary Graham/ 'Flash' Fan
- William Stowell as David Norman
- Lon Chaney as Hector Maitland
- Mattie Witting as Ann Maitland (credited as Mrs. A.E. Witting)
- David Kirby as Jim
- Jane Bernoudy as Sally
- Nellie Allen as Hector's lady friend
- Countess Du Cello as landlady

== Reception ==
"A five-reel drama that can be booked with the assurance that its paper claims are borne out on the screen. Dorothy Phillips is seen to excellent advantage in a dual role--that of two sisters whose moral characteristics are almost exact opposites. The picture is thoroughly worthwhile." ---Moving Picture World

"William Stowell plays the hero, David Norman; Lon Chaney, Hector Maitland, and Mrs. A. E. Witting plays Ann Maitland. Their acting is entirely satisfactory." ---Motography

"In its dramatic substance, it is rather lean... A fine production has been tendered by director Joseph De Grasse." --- Motion Picture News
