= Pay Me! =

1917 film

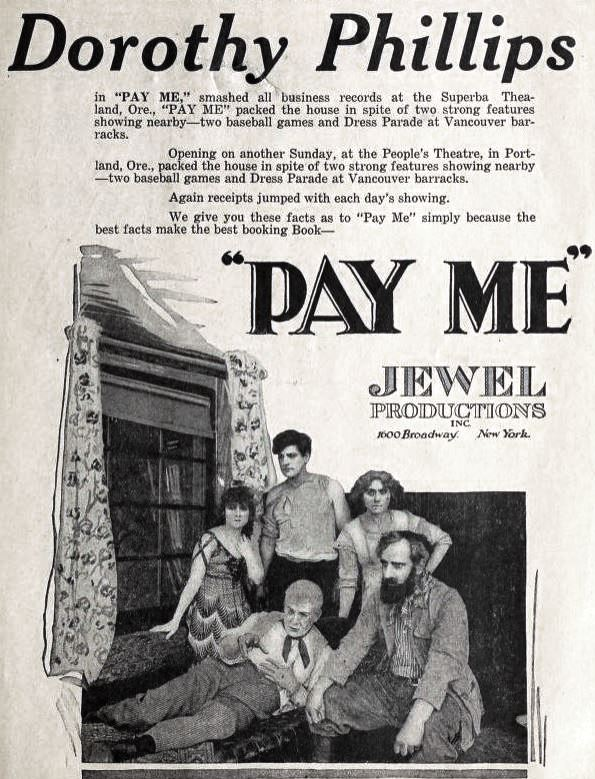
- Trade advertisement
- Directed by: Joe De Grasse
- Written by: Joe De Grasse (story); Bess Meredyth (screenplay)
- Produced by: Universal Pictures
- Starring: Lon Chaney; Dorothy Phillips
- Cinematography: King D. Gray
- Distributed by: Universal Film Manufacturing Company
- Release date: September 1, 1917
- Running time: 5 reels (50 minutes)
- Country: United States
- Language: Silent (English intertitles)

Pay Me! is a 1917 American silent drama film directed by Joe De Grasse and starring Lon Chaney, Dorothy Phillips, and William Stowell. In the United States, the film is also known as The Vengeance of the West. The screenplay was written by Bess Meredith, based on a story by Joe De Grasse. This film was Universal Pictures' first "Jewel Production" release (big budget). Once considered to be a lost film, an incomplete (23-minute) print was rediscovered in the Gosfilmofond archive in Russia in 2019. A still exists showing Lon Chaney in the role of the villainous Joe Lawson.

Like many American films of the time, Pay Me! was subject to cuts by city and state film censorship boards. The Chicago Board of Censors refused to issue a permit for this film because it portrayed a story of murder, abduction, and immorality.

== Plot ==
Hal Curtis and Joe Lawson, partners in a mine, have a disagreement. Lawson strangles Curtis and accidentally shoots Curtis' wife. He deserts his own wife and child and elopes with Hilda Hendricks, a weak girl of the town. As they are leaving, they hear a baby's cry and find Curtis' little daughter in the arms of her dead mother. Hilda takes the child.

Seventeen years pass. Lawson has changed his name to White and owns a dance hall in the heart of lumber country. The men call him "Killer" White. Marta, his partner's child, has grown to womanhood and a lumberjack named Mac Jepson has fallen in love with her. He is chagrined at finding Marta dressed in a sleazy costume, running the roulette wheel in Killer's bar. Curtis wanders into camp and, recognizing Hilda, asks where his daughter is. Hilda points her out to him and he becomes enraged, vowing vengeance on the Killer.

He is backed by the young lumberjack, who is none other than the son Lawson had abandoned. A fight follows and just before Lawson can kill Curtis, a shot rings out and Lawson drops. Hilda holds the gun. Before dying, Lawson tells Marta that she is not his daughter, and the two young people leave together.

== Cast ==
- Lon Chaney as Joe Lawson
- J. Edwin Brown as Martin (as Eddie Brown)
- William Clifford as Hal Curtis
- Evelyn Selbie as Hilda Hendricks
- Tom Wilson as 'Mac' Jepson
- Dorothy Phillips as Marta
- Claire Du Brey as Nita
- William Stowell as Bill The Boss
- John George as Bar Patron
- Dick La Reno as Bit Role (uncredited)

== Reception ==
"PAY ME is a strong, virile drama. It smacks of the melodramatic in its every scene. There is action in every line. The exhibitor can book this picture without a hesitancy. His patrons will be satisfied.....The climax reached is well conceived and put over with a punch.....Dorothy Phillips, who is featured, doesn't get much opportunity to impress her audience that she is really the star. As a matter of fact, Lon Chaney, William Stowell or Evelyn Selbie vie with her for honors. These do unusually good work in character roles." ---Motion Picture News

"Lon Chaney makes the bad man of the plot a little too palpable, but is forceful nevertheless." ---Moving Picture World.

== See also ==
- Lon Chaney filmography
- List of rediscovered films
