= Broadway Love =

1918 film

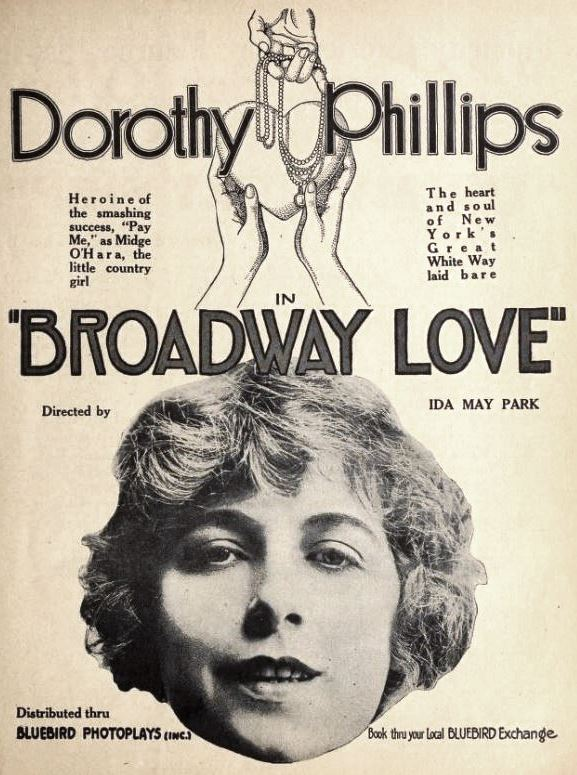
- Trade advertisement, 2 February 1918, The Moving Picture Weekly
- Directed by: Ida May Park
- Written by: Ida May Park; W. Carey Wonderly
- Produced by: Bluebird Photoplays
- Starring: Lon Chaney; Dorothy Phillips; William Stowell
- Cinematography: King D. Gray
- Distributed by: Universal Film Manufacturing Company
- Release date: January 21, 1918
- Running time: 5 reels (60 minutes)
- Country: United States
- Language: Silent (English intertitles)

Broadway Love is a 1918 American silent romance film directed by Ida May Park and starring Dorothy Phillips, William Stowell, and Lon Chaney. It was written by Ida May Park, based on the novelette by W. Carey Wonderly.

== Plot ==
Broadway Love (1918)

The film follows the story of Midge O'Hara, a young country girl who leaves home in order to perform on Broadway. She is able to get hired as a chorus girl, and, at her new job, she meets Cherry Blow, a party girl and gold digger. Cherry dates one man, staying with him until his cash runs out, at which time she leaves for someone else who is wealthy. One of these men is Jack Chalvey, whom Cherry had dated until her expensive tastes left him in debt.

After meeting Midge, Jack, who has become depressed and almost commits suicide, reforms his life and also begins to take interest in her. However, Midge's own life becomes more complicated when her hayseed boyfriend from the country, Elmer Watkins (Lon Chaney), comes into town to propose to her. Midge discourages Elmer and he goes off and marries another woman. To make matters worse, wealthy millionaire Henry Rockwell begins pursuing her as well.

Midge prevents the despondent Jack from killing himself at a party, but she gets soaking wet in a rainstorm accomplishing this. Rockwell offers to help the dripping wet Midge to get home from the party. Sharing a cab ride with her to her apartment, Rockwell attempts to embrace Midge in the back seat, and he causes her to fall out of the cab and injure herself. He later proposes to her at the hospital, and Cherry winds up getting back together with Jack in the end.

== Cast ==
- Dorothy Phillips as Midge O'Hara
- Juanita Hansen as Cherry Blow
- William Stowell as Henry Rockwell
- Harry von Meter as Jack Chalvey
- Lon Chaney as Elmer Watkins
- Gladys Tennyson as Mrs. Watkins
- Eve Southern as Drina

== Production ==
The screenplay was based on "Broadway Love" by W. Carey Wonderly, a novelette published in Snappy Stories, on 18 June 1916.

By 10 November 1917, principal photography had begun at Universal's studios in Universal City, California, as reported by the Motion Picture News. By 15 December 1917, filming had ended, as reported by the Motion Picture News.

== Censorship ==
Like many American films of the time, Broadway Love was subject to cuts by city and state film censorship boards. For example, the Chicago Board of Censors required a cut, in Reel 2, of an intoxicated man falling on a couch and then from same, the intertitle "I've heard tell of these places", struggle scene where man takes hold of woman's shoulders, in Reel 3, last scene of men and woman drinking at table, kissing woman on shoulder in automobile and all but the first and last struggle scenes, and two intertitles "You've left me alone" etc. and "It's your own game" etc.

== Distribution ==
The film's poster showcases Dorothy Phillips, evidence that, at this point in his career, Lon Chaney was not yet a major star. A still exists showing Lon Chaney in the role of the hayseed boyfriend, Elmer Watkins.

A print of the film survives in the George Eastman Museum Motion Picture Collection.

== Reception ==
"W. Carey Wonderly, the author of the story, knows his Tenderloin and the life that passes inside and outside of its many stage doors...Dorothy Phillips makes Midge a reality, and that is both a personal and artistic triumph. Well-played roles are provided by...Lon Chaney as Elmer Watkins, and Harry von Meter as Jack Chalvey." --- Moving Picture World

"This is another one of the stories that is supposed to depict life as it is along the gay white lane. It doesn't do that, but as a feature picture it is better than the usual run of Bluebirds.... Lon Chaney carried the heavy along nicely, although there was too much comedy in his early make-up." --- Wid's Film Daily

Also, Wid's Film Daily review "found the film as a whole “inconsistent” but particularly praised this “flat party” scene and noted that “the direction is greatly responsible for the interest the story arouses”"—Mark Garrett Cooper, Women Film Pioneers Project
