= King D. Gray =

American cinematographer (1886–1938)

- Born: King David Gray; March 9, 1886; Danville, Virginia, USA
- Died: June 30, 1938 (aged 52); Los Angeles, California, USA
- Cause of death: Homicide (gunshot to the chest)
- Occupation: Cinematographer

King D. Gray (1886–1938) was an American cinematographer active in Hollywood from the 1910s through the 1930s. He was shot and killed in front of a post office in Hollywood in 1938 at the age of 52; his killer has never been identified.

== Biography ==
=== Early life ===
King David Gray was born in Danville, Virginia, to Gabriel Gray and Elizabeth Slaughter. Gray married Myrtle Nichols in Berkeley, California, in 1907; the pair had two sons. The marriage may not have been a happy one: Gray was reported to have had a number of dalliances with other women, many of whom were unaware that Gray was married.

=== Hollywood career ===
After moving to California as a young man, he began working in Hollywood as a lighting technician before becoming a cinematographer. His first cinematography credit was on 1915's The College Orphan. He lensed more than 50 features and shorts over the course of his career, and also racked up several credits as a camera operator.

=== Mysterious death ===
Gray was shot and killed in Hollywood on June 30, 1938, after a night of revelry. The body was discovered in a car parked in front of a post office on Wilcox Boulevard eight to 15 hours later by James Fisher, who worked in advertising at The Hollywood Citizen-News. When police investigated the crime scene, they found that Gray had been shot in the chest from a distance of a foot or more and was clutching a letter that was addressed to "daddy dear." The letter was reportedly from a "friend" named Frances Blakeley, a 29-year-old graduate of the University of Southern California. Gray may have been at the post office specifically to check a P.O. box where he received secret correspondences.

Friends said he had been depressed in the weeks leading up to his death, but police believed the death to be a homicide and stated that jealousy or robbery could have been motives. However, investigators noted that Gray's valuables had not been stolen. A San Francisco typewriter repairman, John "Jack" Henry Moran, was questioned after bragging about the murder in a Bay Area cafe, but he was eventually released from police custody. Another suspect was a 35-year-old ex-convict named Joseph L. Chester, who committed suicide in Baldwin Park, California, after a high-speed car chase through nearby Ventura County in July 1938. Gray's murder remains unsolved.

== Selected filmography ==
- The College Orphan (1915)
- The Mark of Cain (1916)
- If My Country Should Call (1916)
- The Place Beyond the Winds (1916)
- The Price of Silence (1916)
- The Piper's Price (1917)
- Hell Morgan's Girl (1917)
- The Girl in the Checkered Coat (1917)
- The Flashlight (1917)
- Fires of Rebellion (1917)
- Pay Me! (1917)
- Bondage (1917)
- The Scarlet Car (1917)
- Bread (1918)
- The Grand Passion (1918)
- A Doll's House (1918)
- Broadway Love (1918)
- The Vanity Pool (1918)
- The Squaw Man (1918)
- The Heart of Humanity (1918)
- Paid in Advance (1919)
- The Midlanders (1920)
- The Double O (1921)
- Peggy Puts It Over (1921)
- A Yankee Go-Getter (1921)
- More to Be Pitied Than Scorned (1922)
- Fools of Fortune (1922)
- Yesterday's Wife (1923)
- Forgive and Forget (1923)
- Flapper Wives (1924)
- Wreckage (1925)
- The Love Gamble (1925)
- White Fang (1925)
- Speed (1925)
- The Gambling Fool (1925)
- Under the Rouge (1925)
- Midnight Faces (1926)
- Speed Crazed (1926)
- The Ghetto Shamrock (1926), directed by Francis Ford
- All Faces West (1929)

== See also ==
- List of unsolved murders (1900–1979)
