= The Rescue (1917 film) =

1917 film

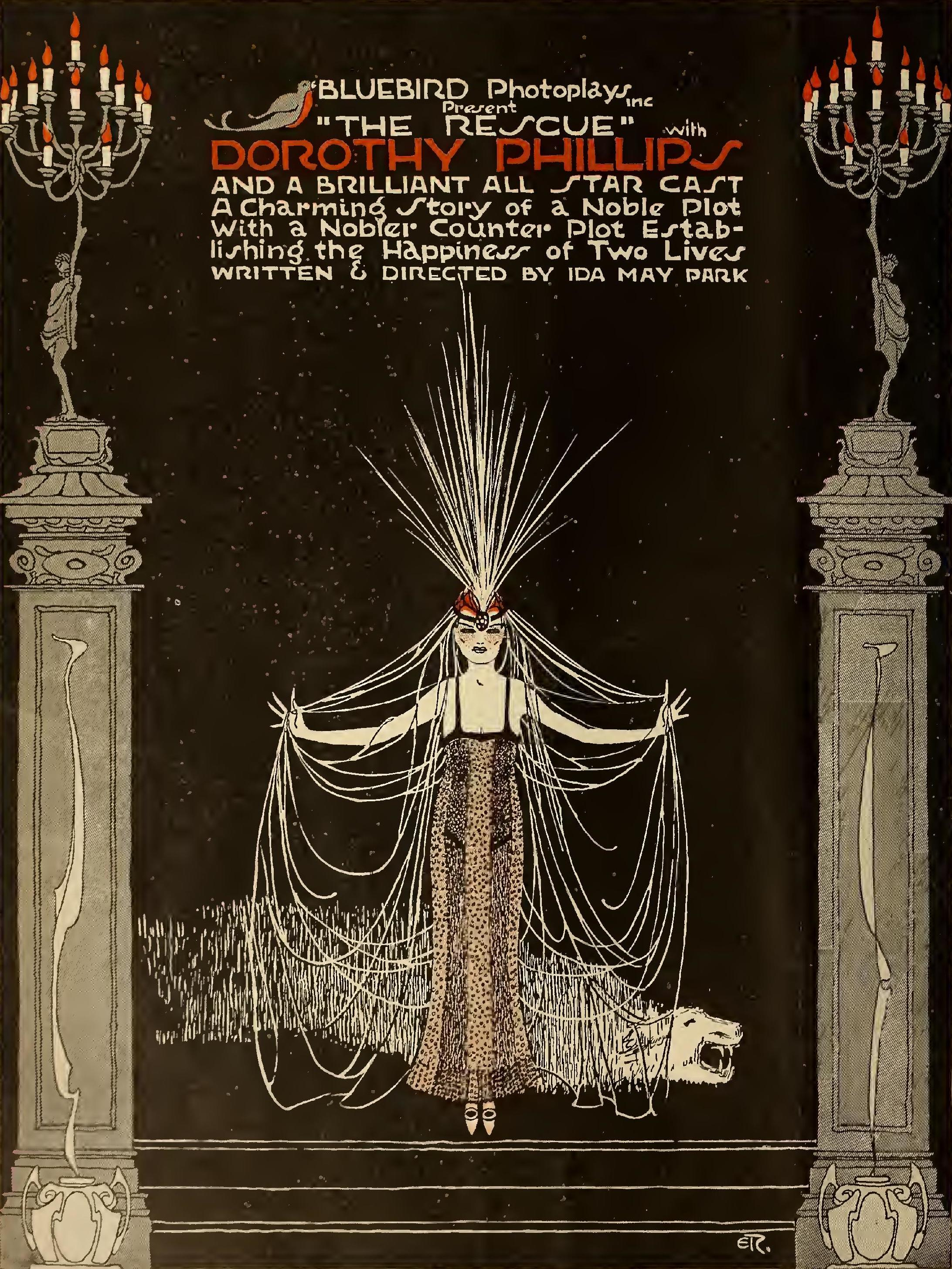
- Ad for film
- Directed by: Ida May Park
- Written by: Ida May Park (screenplay); Hugh McNair Kahler (story)
- Produced by: Bluebird Photoplays
- Starring: Lon Chaney; Dorothy Phillips
- Cinematography: King D. Gray
- Music by: "Dreams of Love" (6/4 Poco Allegro) by Liszt
- Distributed by: Universal Pictures
- Release date: July 30, 1917
- Running time: 5 reels (50 minutes)
- Country: United States
- Language: Silent (English intertitles)

The Rescue is a 1917 American silent drama film written and directed by Ida May Park and starring Lon Chaney, William Stowell, and Dorothy Phillips. The screenplay was based on a story by Hugh McNair Kahler. The film is today considered lost. A photo exists showing Lon Chaney in his role as Thomas Holland, a rare occasion when Chaney did not play a villain.

== Plot ==
As described in a film magazine review, Anne Wetherall returns to the stage after the court grants her a divorce from her husband Kent. She returns to her former home and starts a romance with Thomas Holland. Anne learns that her best friend's daughter Betty is throwing herself at Anne's ex-husband Kent, and Betty's mother asks Anne to prevent her daughter from forming a relationship with the alcoholic ne'er-do-well. Anne pits her wisdom and charm against Betty's youth and beauty. Soon after Anne realizes that she still loves Kent. Her fight to win back her man from Betty ends up at the justice of the peace, where she and Kent are remarried.

== Cast ==
- Dorothy Phillips as Anne Wetherall
- William Stowell as Kent Wetherall
- Lon Chaney as Thomas Holland
- Gretchen Lederer as Nell Jerrold
- Molly Malone as Betty Jerrold, Nell's daughter
- Claire Du Brey as Henriette
- Gertrude Astor as Mrs. Hendricks

== Reception ==
"Bluebird has fashioned a photoplay drama which rises to the heights of dramatic excellence and presents Dorothy Phillips in one of the best parts of her screen career. The problem of divorce is taken up, stirring scenes are depicted, and you will see five of the prettiest girls on the screen....A plot of considerable spice...pretty scenes, capable actresses and a surprise ending unite to make The Rescue a most entertaining piece of pictorial storytelling." ---Motion Picture News

"The atmosphere of artificiality that hangs over the story has also enveloped the acting of Dorothy Phillips, a fault seldom noticed in her work...William Stowell, Lon Chaney, Gretchen Lederer and Molly Malone are competent members of the cast." ---Moving Picture World

"William Stowell and Lon Chaney, who always lead Miss Phillips' support, perform their usual excellent service in presenting their details of the story in forceful directness. For once, Mr. Chaney is not a 'villain,' being here cast as a perfectly human being who directs his good offices to the happy outcome of the plot." ---Variety
