= The Piper's Price =

1917 film

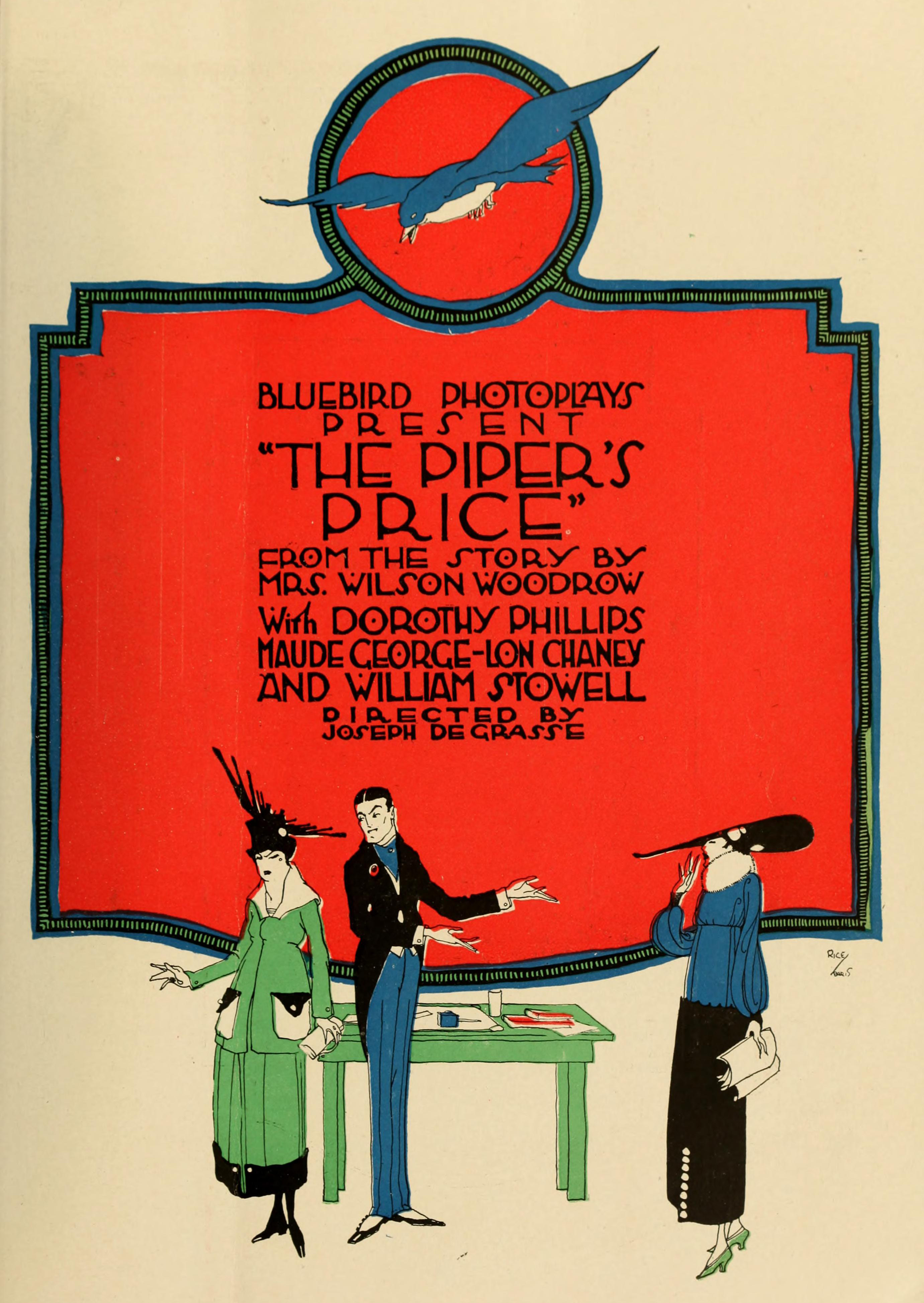
- Film poster
- Directed by: Joe De Grasse
- Written by: Ida May Park (screenplay); Nancy Mann Waddel Woodrow (short story)
- Produced by: Bluebird Photoplays
- Starring: Dorothy Phillips; Lon Chaney; William Stowell
- Cinematography: King D. Gray
- Distributed by: Universal Pictures
- Release date: January 8, 1917
- Running time: 5 reels (50 minutes)
- Country: United States
- Language: Silent with English intertitles

The Piper's Price is a 1917 silent drama film directed by Joe De Grasse and starring Lon Chaney, William Stowell and Dorothy Phillips. It was the first in a series of films co-starring William Stowell and Dorothy Phillips together. The screenplay was written by Ida May Park, based on the short story by Nancy Mann Waddel Woodrow (aka Mrs. Wilson Woodrow). The film was released in the U.K. as Storm and Sunshine. The film is today considered lost. A still exists showing Lon Chaney in the role of Billy Kilmartin.

== Plot ==
Ralph Hadley's ex-wife, Jessica, is a shrewd businesswoman, while his new wife, Amy, is the perfect homemaker. Billy Kilmartin, an attorney, has sought to woo Jessica for many years, and now that she is divorced from Ralph, he doubles down on his efforts to win her. At a stockholders meeting, Jessica makes several intelligent suggestions that win both the approval of the company and Ralph's admiration. Ralph wants Jessica back and takes her to lunch. Amy soon hears gossip about her husband dating his ex-wife and she worries about losing him to the other woman.

Amy learns that she is pregnant, but decides to keep it a secret from Ralph. She goes to Ralph's office and is introduced to Jessica at a meeting there, and after Jessica leaves, Amy starts a fight with Ralph. Ralph considers the whole thing entirely innocent, but soon realizes that it's not just a harmless fling. He is indeed falling in love with his ex-wife.

Amy goes to Jessica, telling her that she and Ralph are going to have a child together, and Jessica realizes she must stop seeing Ralph. But when Ralph finally demands to see her, she tells him that she and Billy Kilmartin were married that morning. Ralph goes home, prepared to commit suicide, when the doctor enters and congratulates him on the birth of his child. Ralph realizes that Amy was his true love all the time, and the happy family are reunited.

== Cast ==
- William Stowell as Ralph Hadley
- Dorothy Phillips as Amy Hadley, Ralph's wife
- Maude George as Jessica Hadley, Ralph's ex-wife (credited as Maud George)
- Lon Chaney as Billy Kilmartin
- Claire Du Brey as Jessica's Maid

== Reception ==
"Such conduct on the part of the two offenders against common decency should put them outside the pale of sympathy, and the second wife exhibits such a lamentable weakness of character during the affair that pity for her should be mingled with contempt. It cannot be denied, however, that there exists a grade of mind which will follow the fortunes of these three humans with the deepest interest and herald the ending as a triumph for justice and truth. An important factor in bringing about this result is the excellence of the acting by the entire cast." ---Moving Picture World

"A well treated domestic drama is THE PIPER'S PRICE, quite conventional when you get down to the bottom of things, but original on the surface, due to a few new twists...Dorothy Phillips, as Amy, gives an emotional performance...while Lon Chaney has the only other part of importance." ---Motion Picture News
