= The Flashlight =

1917 film

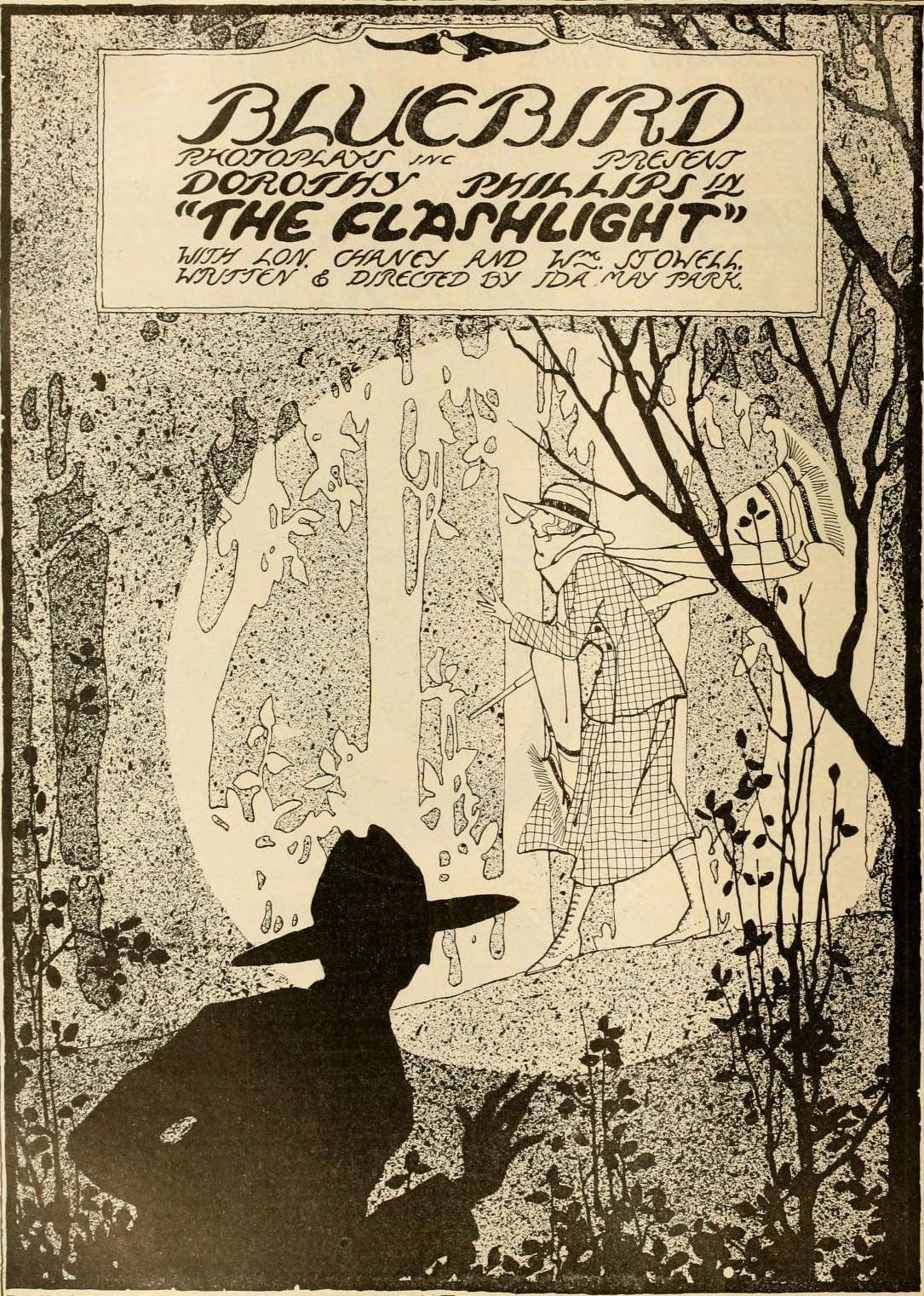
- Directed by: Ida May Park
- Written by: Ida May Park; Albert Treynor
- Produced by: Bluebird Photoplays
- Starring: Lon Chaney; Dorothy Phillips
- Cinematography: King D. Gray
- Distributed by: Universal Pictures
- Release date: May 21, 1917
- Running time: 5 reels (50 minutes)
- Country: United States
- Language: Silent with English intertitles

The Flashlight is a 1917 American silent drama film directed by Ida May Park and starring Lon Chaney, Dorothy Phillips and William Stowell. The screenplay was written by Ida May Park, based on the short story by Albert M. Treynore. This was the first film Ida May Park ever directed.

Lon Chaney played a dual role in this film, appearing as both the murdered victim Porter Brixton as well as Brixton's stepbrother Harry Norton (see Plot section below). The film's original working title was The Flashlight Girl. The film is today considered lost. A still exists showing Lon Chaney in heavy makeup in the role of Henry Norton.

== Plot ==
Photographer Jack Lane heads for the mountains to try out his new camera which is capable of automatically snapping photos of any wild animal that passes by its lens. Something triggers the mechanism while he is sleeping that night and a photograph is snapped. When Jack develops it, he sees a picture of a beautiful young girl running through the woods, carrying a rifle.

Jack investigates a nearby cabin in which the owner, a man named Porter Brixton, has been murdered. Soon after, Sheriff John Peterson arrests Jack for the murder, because Jack's footprints were found near the dead man's cabin. On the way to jail, Jack creates a clever diversion and escapes. Stealing a canoe, Jack furiously paddles down river pursued by a group of local townspeople who want to lynch him. The canoe is capsized and Jack drags himself to the shore.

When he wakes the next morning, the girl in the photograph is standing over him. He learns that her name is Delice and he suspects she was the one who killed Porter Brixton the night before. They head downriver together, but they soon become lost and find themselves back at the scene of the murder. Delice disappears, and soon Lane is captured, learning later on that Delice turned him in, thinking he was the killer. At the trial, Jack does not mention the photo he took of Delice running with the rifle, not wanting to incriminate her. The girl takes the stand, and her testimony incriminates herself.

In an attempt to protect her, Jack confesses to the crime, when suddenly the murdered man Porter Brixton suddenly enters the courtroom. He explains to the shocked spectators that he is actually Henry Norton, Brixton's step-brother. Brixton was an evil man, and had driven Brixton's wife to an early death and then had himself appointed guardian to his daughter Delice, the girl in the photograph. When Norton confronted Brixton, his half-brother drew his gun, but was killed when Norton outdrew him. Lane and Delice are released, and the Judge consoles Delice that her father will surely be able to plead self-defense. Jack and Delice come to realize their love for one another as the story ends.

== Cast ==
- Dorothy Phillips as Delice Brixton
- William Stowell as Jack Lane
- Lon Chaney as Dual Role as two brothers, Henry Norton and Porter Brixton
- Alfred Allen as Sheriff John Peterson
- George Berrell as Barclay (as George Burrell)
- Evelyn Selbie as Mrs. Barclay
- Clyde Benson as Deputy sheriff
- Orin Jackson as Howard, Jack Lane's servant (credited as O.C. Jackson)
- Mark Fenton as Judge

== Reception ==
"A picture of merit in rank with some of the best picturizations of dramatic narrative and will stand as one of the best efforts yet of Bluebird (Photoplays)...Lon Chaney in support is convincing." --- Motion Picture News

Motography gave the film a positive review, praising its acting, direction, and outdoor woodland locations. The reviewer noted that its straightforward plot was "skilfully set forth" to hold audience interest through the final scene, describing the film's blend of adventure and mystery as a "welcome relief from heavy, morbid dramas."
