= When a Girl Loves (1919 film) =

1919 film

- Promotional still from Motion Picture News magazine
- Directed by: Phillips Smalley; Lois Weber
- Written by: Lois Weber
- Starring: Mildred Harris; William Stowell; Wharton Jones
- Cinematography: Dal Clawson
- Production companies: Lois Weber Productions; Jewel Productions
- Distributed by: Universal Pictures
- Release date: February 19, 1919
- Running time: 60 minutes (six reels)
- Country: United States
- Languages: Silent; English intertitles

When a Girl Loves is a 1919 American silent Western film directed by Phillips Smalley and Lois Weber and starring Mildred Harris, William Stowell and Wharton Jones. The film is now lost.

== Plot ==
This plot synopsis is taken from an article in Motion Picture News.

"Eagle" Ryan is the leader of a notorious outlaw gang operating near the lawless city of Oatman. The gang plans to steal a large shipment of gold, which will by delivered by the express office.

Ryan learns that a minister is bound to Oatman for his health, along with his daughter, Bess. Ryan boards the train before it reaches the father and daughter's destination. He invites them to stay at his ranch, and they accept.

Ryan goes to town posing as the minister, and his first encounter is with Ben Grant: the boss and bully of the community. Ryan bests Grant, and then announces he will be preaching on Sunday in the barroom. Ryan's attitude and his announcement draw a large crowd, and he preaches with enthusiasm that surprises himself. Before this point, he had always defied God and rejected religion. However, he preaches a sermon and begins to cry.

The town talks about Ryan, the minister thanks him, and Bess admires him. Ryan tries to deny his new morality, but is unable to do so.

Ryan's gang learns of the gold shipment and that Ryan is guarding it. Bess overhears the outlaws plotting and rides to save Ryan. He resists the bandits and saves the gold, but he is badly wounded. During his recovery, he confesses everything and is forgiven by the townsfolk and by Bess, whom he now loves.

== Cast ==
- William Stowell as "Eagle" Ryan
- Mildred Harris as Bess
- Wharton Jones as The Minister
- Alfred Paget as Ben Grant
- Willis Marks as William Wiatt, station agent

== Release ==
The film was advertised as "Lois Weber's First Great Western Production." Mildred Harris' marriage to Charlie Chaplin was also prominently featured in the advertising. In Universal Pictures' magazine, The Moving Picture Weekly, the suggested "Advertising Angles" included using the "Mrs. Charlie Chaplin" name, but to not forget that Harris had "a following of her own," as well as to promote the film as a "Western drama with a real plot."

For the Exhibitors Herald, J. B. Stein of the Gem theatre in Clinton, Indiana, called it "A strong western with an unusual story and well produced," and that the film did "Fair business," but pointed out that William Stowell was the star of the film, not Mildred Harris. Also for the Exhibitors Herald, A. J. Twilegar of the Lyric Theatre in Goldfield, Nevada wrote that the film was "one of the poorest I ever played. Nobody liked it," adding that the cinematography was disappointing and the theater lost money. Twilegar, similarly to Stein, complained that the "star" had only a minor part in the story.

The film was not a considered success.
