= The Place Beyond the Winds =

1916 film

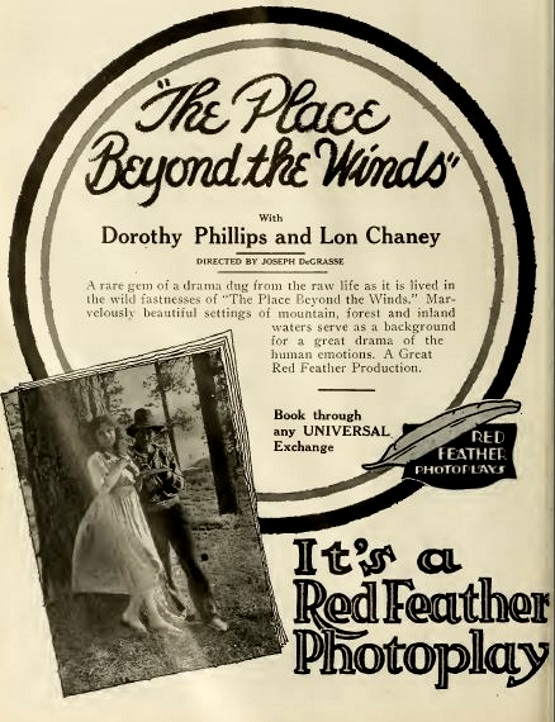
- Directed by: Joe De Grasse
- Written by: Ida May Park (screenplay); Harriet Theresa Comstock (the novel)
- Produced by: Red Feather Photoplays
- Starring: Lon Chaney; Dorothy Phillips
- Cinematography: King D. Gray
- Distributed by: Universal Pictures
- Release date: November 6, 1916
- Running time: 5 reels (50 minutes)
- Country: United States
- Language: Silent with English intertitles
- Budget: $ 9,492.00

The Place Beyond the Winds is a 1916 American silent drama film directed by Joe De Grasse, and starring Lon Chaney, Gretchen Lederer and Dorothy Phillips. It was written by Ida May Park, based on the novel by Harriet T. Comstock. The director De Grasse also played a role in the film. The film's original working title was Mansion of Despair. A still exists showing Chaney in the role of Jerry Jo, the homeless man.

Four of the five reels (reels 2, 3, 4 and 5) still survive in the film archive in the Library of Congress and in the National Archives of Canada. The incomplete print was found in Dawson City, Canada in 1978, along with an incomplete print of another 1916 Chaney film called If My Country Should Call.

Film historian Jon C. Mirsalis explains: "THE PLACE BEYOND THE WINDS was the last of three pictures Chaney made for the Red Feather production company, and through one of the most bizarre episodes in film preservation history, two of these three films exist in partial form. In 1978, excavation had begun for a new recreation center for Dawson City. A bulldozer dug into the earth and came up with a shovelful of reels of nitrate film. Dawson City had been the end of the line for many film distributors, and the titles were stored at the local library until 1929 when the flammable nitrate was used as landfill in a condemned swimming pool and promptly forgotten. Stored for 50 years under the Yukon permafrost, the films were surprisingly well preserved, although sadly, many reels that had survived the years unscathed were damaged in thawing and show water marking on the edges. Also included in this amazing treasure trove were films by Pearl White, Harold Lloyd, and Douglas Fairbanks....".

== Plot ==
Priscilla Glenn was a wild, nature-loving child who lived in the woods with her mother and her abusive father. She constructs a crude altar to the goddess of Nature in a hidden spot in the forest. Priscilla desperately wants an education and seeks out books to read. Anton Farwell, the local schoolmaster, has also come to the woods, but he is in hiding. He had once loved a woman named Joan Moss, and for her love he killed Dr. Leydward's brother. Leydward says he knows Farwell killed his brother but he tells Farwell he will not turn him in to the police if Farwell agrees to remain there and live in the woods for the rest of his life.

Mrs. Travers and her crippled son Dick have travelled there also with Dr. Leydward for their health. He is a specialist who is able to straighten the boy's crooked limbs. Dick Travers and Priscilla are attracted to each other, but Dick soon returns to the big city. Jerry Jo, a half-breed, lures Priscilla to a house that has a wonderful library under the pretense of letting her read some books, and then attempts to molest her. She escapes unharmed, but her father thinks that she has been raped and forces her to leave home. Priscilla moves to the city where she becomes a nurse in Dr. Leydward's hospital. There, she again encounters Dick, but the two do not recognize each other.

Dr. Leydward's daughter, Margaret, is set to marry Clyde Hunter. One day, Priscilla sees Jerry Jo, now a homeless beggar, and taking pity on him, she decides to help him. Following him home, she comes to a tenement where some residents persuade her to help a dying woman and her baby. The woman is Joan Moss, Anton Farwell's ex-sweetheart, who tells her that she is married now to Clyde Hunter. Priscilla, remembering that Margaret was supposed to marry Clyde Hunter soon, tells Margaret's father what has happened, then decides to return to her old home in the woods.

Upon her return, Priscilla discovers that her mother has died and her father is now blind, but still he refuses to allow her to set foot in his home. Priscilla tells Farwell that Joan Moss died and that she forgave him on her death bed, but she does not tell him of the sordid life Joan had led. Priscilla returns to her secret place in the woods where years before she had erected the makeshift altar to her own private god, when suddenly she hears a violin playing. It is Dick, who has moved back to the woods, and she dances in wild abandon to his music. The two are happily reunited, and she later reconciles with her blind father.

== Cast ==
- Dorothy Phillips as Priscilla Glenn
- Jack Mulhall as Dick Travers
- Lon Chaney as Jerry Jo
- Joe De Grasse as Anton Farwell
- C. Norman Hammond as Nathan Glenn
- Alice May Youse as Mrs. Glenn
- Grace Carlyle as Joan Moss
- Countess Du Cello as Mrs. Travers
- William Powers as Dr. Leeydward

== Production ==
The exteriors for The Place Beyond the Winds were partially filmed at Big Bear Valley.

== Reception ==
"This contains some very picturesque and enjoyable scenic views. The story, while not of a dramatic type, is well constructed and holds the interest. Dorothy Phillips plays the part of Priscilla artistically; Lon Chaney portrays well the part of the half-breed." ---Moving Picture World

"THE PLACE BEYOND THE WINDS has its shortcomings and regretably they are not to be counterbalanced by its merits. There is fine photography, superb settings, good acting if not always apropos of the situation, but the story is weak. As to the presentation of the story, Mr. De Grasse's work is not meritorious." ---Motion Picture News

Jon C. Mirsalis opined "Cast as a crazed rapist, Chaney used make-up to appear as a scar-faced native who violently attacks the heroine, but is later reformed by her generosity. Chaney is the clear stand-out in an otherwise tepid cast, and it is clear to see why he soon left Universal to find better roles."

== See also ==
- List of incomplete or partially lost films
