= William Stowell (actor) =

American actor

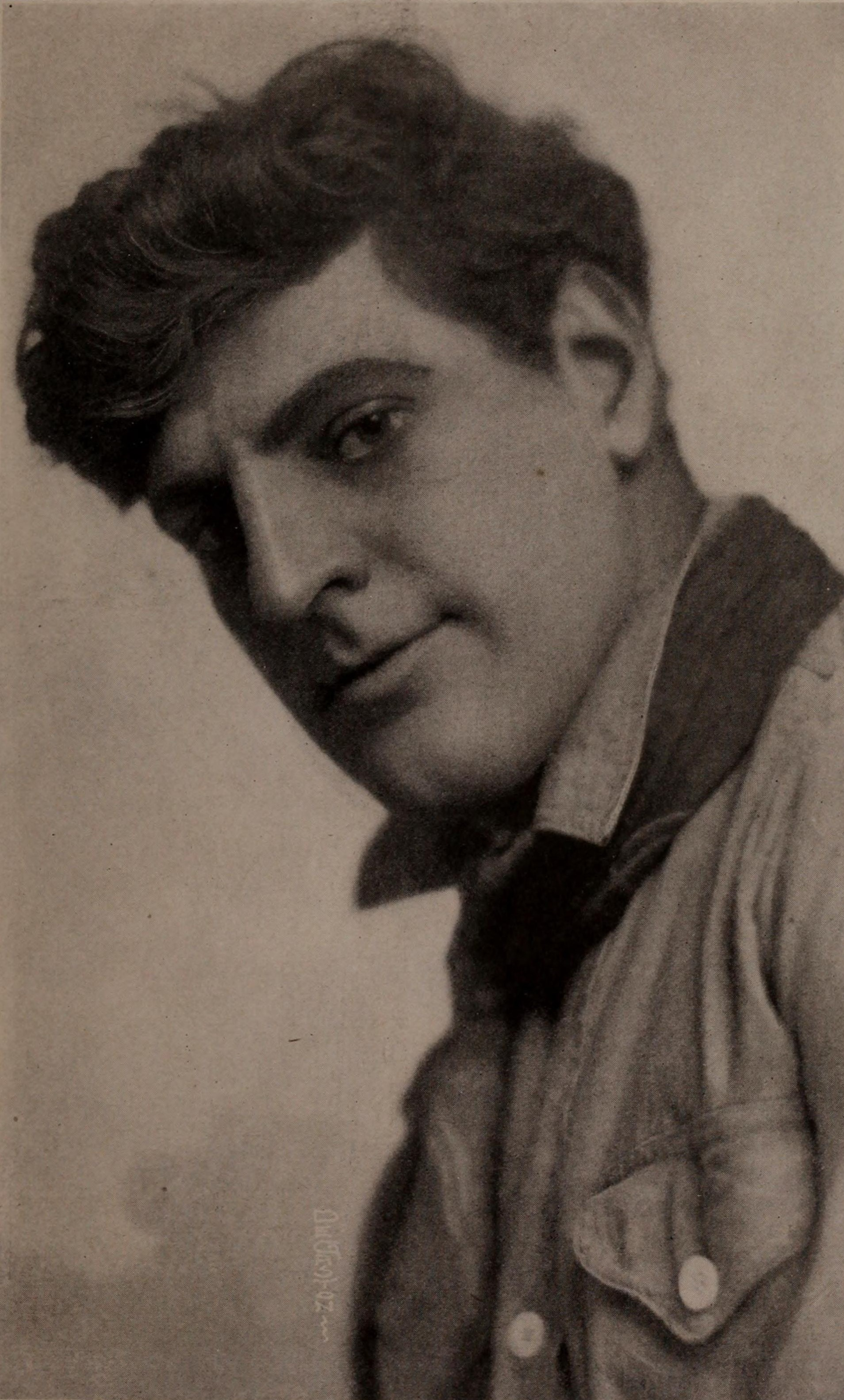
- Stowell, c. 1915
- Born: William H. Stowell Farr; 1881 or March 13, 1885; Boston, Massachusetts, US
- Died: December 5, 1919 (aged 38); Belgian Congo
- Occupation: Actor

William Stowell (1881 or March 13, 1885 – November 24, 1919) was an American silent film actor.

He was born in Boston, Massachusetts, as William H. Stowell Farr. Stowell was reportedly 38 years old at the time of his death in December, 1919. His father was Daniel T. Farr.

Stowell worked for the Selig Polyscope Company for four and a half years, then was with the American Company for one and half years, and then spent two and a half years at Universal Pictures until his death.

He was signed into film in 1909 with the Independent Moving Pictures Company, better known simply as IMP (forerunner of Universal Studios), and debuted by starring in the popular hit The Cowboy Millionaire (1909), also starring Tom Mix. Between 1909 and 1919 Stowell starred in 119 silent films, often playing in over 10 films a year.

In 1915 he starred in The Great Question alongside actors such as Harold Lockwood with American Studios. In 1916 he starred in The Love Hermit portraying Jack Hillman, and began appearing in a series of Universal features that paired him with Lon Chaney and Dorothy Phillips. Stowell's early death brought the series of adventures to a close.

In 1918 he co-starred with Dorothy Phillips and Erich Von Stroheim in The Heart of Humanity.

Photoplay wrote that he had "taken six thousand feet of film up to the time of his death."

== Accident and death ==
William Stowell was severely injured in a trainwreck in Belgian Congo on December 4, 1919 and died 30 hours later from his injuries.

Stowell went to Africa on a Smithsonian Institution expedition in connection with Universal, in order to get footage for educational films and travelogues. The expedition left Sakania and was bound for Élizabethville (now Lubumbashi), Belgian Congo. Their coach was coupled to a train with six freight cars and one tank car. The tank car, at the end of the train, became uncoupled and "ran down grade crashing into the special coach."

Stowell and a fellow expedition member, Dr. Joseph R. Armstrong, were both injured in the trainwreck and later passed away. Stowell's neck was broken and he died 30 hours later. He was listed as having been 38 years old. Dr. Armstrong died six hours after the accident due to a severe head injury. He was 48 years old. Several natives were reportedly killed, as well.

Survivors included cinematographer Pliny Horne, laboratory expert Henry Noel Kohler, and N.E.A. newspaper correspondent Edward M. Theirry. Reportedly, "native woodcutters" rescued people from the accident site and sheltered the injured for 16 hours, until a relief train arrived.

Universal president Carl Laemmle stated that he was, "shocked and deeply grieved" by the news and Stowell had "endeared himself...into the hearts of every member of the Universal company."

He was survived by an aunt.

== Selected filmography ==
- The Cowboy Millionaire (1909)
- Brown of Harvard (1911)
- The Ex-Convict's Plunge (1913)
- The Buzzard's Shadow (1915)
- The Great Question (1915)
- In the Line of Duty (1915)
- The Love Hermit (1916)
- The Other Side of the Door (1916)
- Triumph (1917)
- Pay Me! (1917)
- Fighting Mad (1917)
- Bondage (1917)
- The Rescue (1917)
- Fires of Rebellion (1917)
- A Doll's House (1917)
- The Flashlight (1917)
- The Girl in the Checkered Coat (1917)
- Hell Morgan's Girl (1917)
- The Piper's Price (1917)
- The Talk of the Town (1918)
- Broadway Love (1918)
- The Grand Passion (1918)
- The Man in the Moonlight (1919)
- Destiny (1919)
- When a Girl Loves (1919)
