= Dorothy Phillips =

American actress (1889–1980)

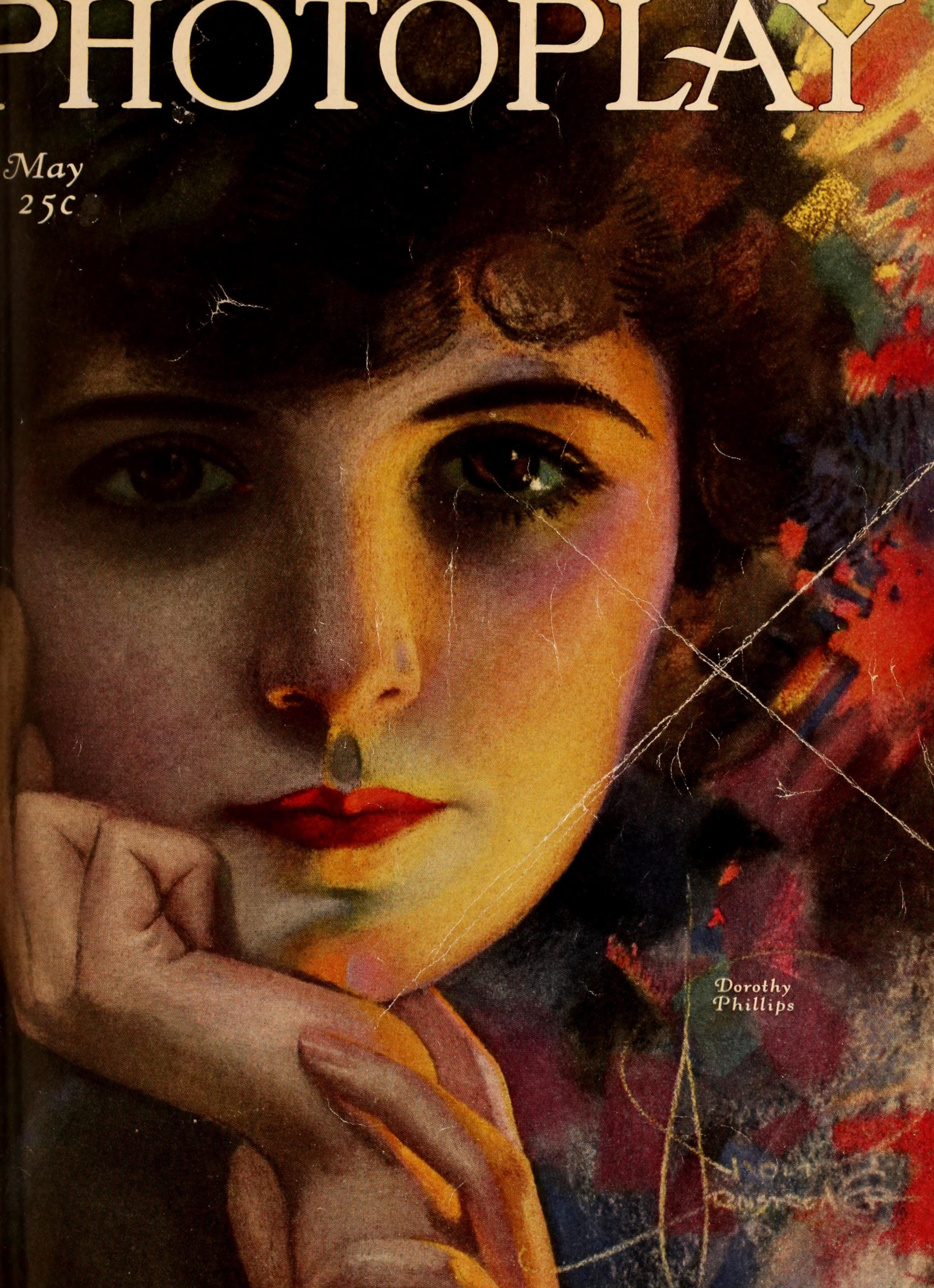
- Dorothy Phillips painted by Rolf Armstrong for the cover of Photoplay, May 1923
- Born: Dorothy Gwendolyn Strible; October 30, 1889; Baltimore, Maryland, U.S.
- Died: March 1, 1980 (aged 90); Los Angeles, California, U.S.
- Other name: Kid Nazimova
- Occupation: Actress
- Years active: 1911–1962
- Spouse: Allen Holubar (m.1912–1923; his death)

Dorothy Phillips (born Dorothy Gwendolyn Strible, October 30, 1889 – March 1, 1980) was an American stage and film actress. She is known for her emotional performances in melodramas, having played a number of "brow beaten" women on screen, but had a pleasant demeanor off. She garnered little press for anything outside of her work.

== Career ==
Born Dorothy Gwendolyn Strible in Baltimore, Phillips was educated at the College of Expression of Maryland. After graduation she acted with the George Fawcett Stock Co. Phillips continued her career as a stage actress with Colonel Savage Productions, acting in New York and Chicago. She made her film debut in 1911 in a two-reeler called The Rosary, and appeared in over 150 films during her career. For a time she was nicknamed Kid Nazimova for her ability to imitate the Russian Hollywood actress Alla Nazimova. Phillips started at Universal Pictures often starring with Lon Chaney. Sometimes she would supplement these features with "shorts" filmed at Fox Studios. By 1917 Phillips had appeared in 22 films over two years and had suffered a breakdown due to exhaustion. It also caused a breach in her working relationship with director Joseph De Grasse and his screenwriter/director wife Ida May Park.

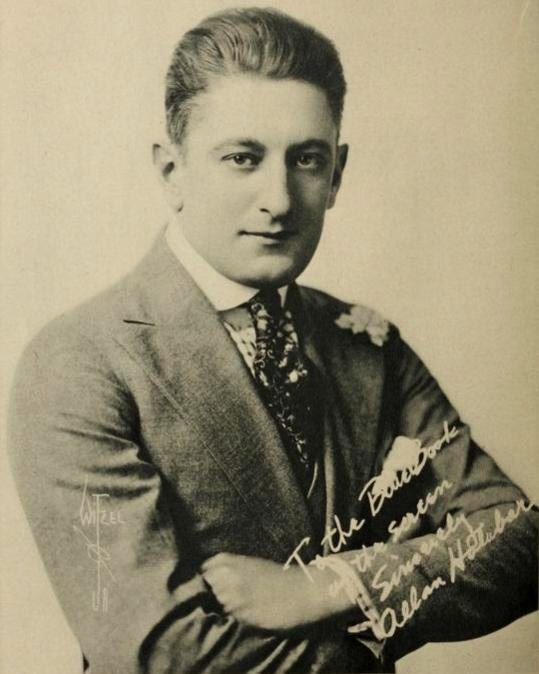
Allen Holubar 1923

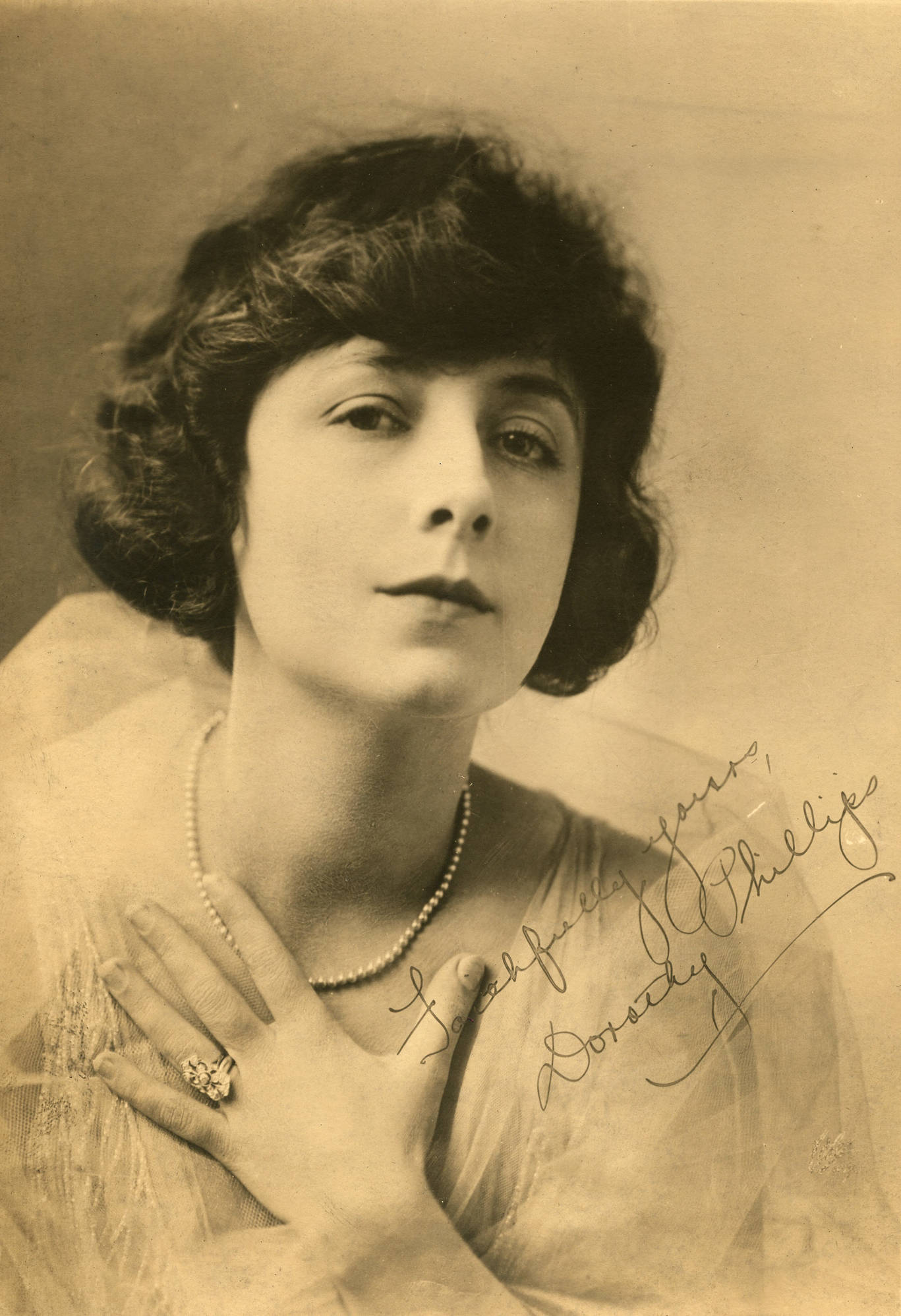
Dorothy Phillips 1919

Once she had rested and recovered, 1918 brought a series of successful films, including A Soul for Sale, the first film starring her that was directed by her husband, Allen J. Holubar. Her pictures during this time scored highly with exhibitors and patrons alike. These successes and newfound working relationship between the couple prompted Phillips to leave Universal and in 1920 she and Holubar formed their own company, Allen Holubar Productions. Their pictures were released through First National Pictures to further acclaim throughout the 1920s.

Phillips' career slowed after 1927, and she mainly appeared in uncredited bit roles for the rest of her career. Her last appearance was in the 1962 western The Man Who Shot Liberty Valance.

== Marriage and death ==
Dorothy Phillips was married to actor-director Allen Holubar for 11 years until his death in 1923 from pneumonia, following surgery, at the age of 33. They met when she was starring on stage in the Chicago production of "Every Woman" as the character of Modesty. After his death, she did not return to acting until mid-1925. Phillips also died of pneumonia, in 1980, at the age of 90. She is buried with her husband at the Secret Garden section of Hollywood Forever Cemetery in Los Angeles.

== Legacy ==
For her contribution to the motion picture industry, Dorothy Phillips has a star on the Hollywood Walk of Fame, located at 6358 Hollywood Blvd. Phillips and Holubar's 1918 film The Heart of Humanity was shown at MOMA, The Museum of Modern Art in a 2014 exhibition.

== Filmography ==
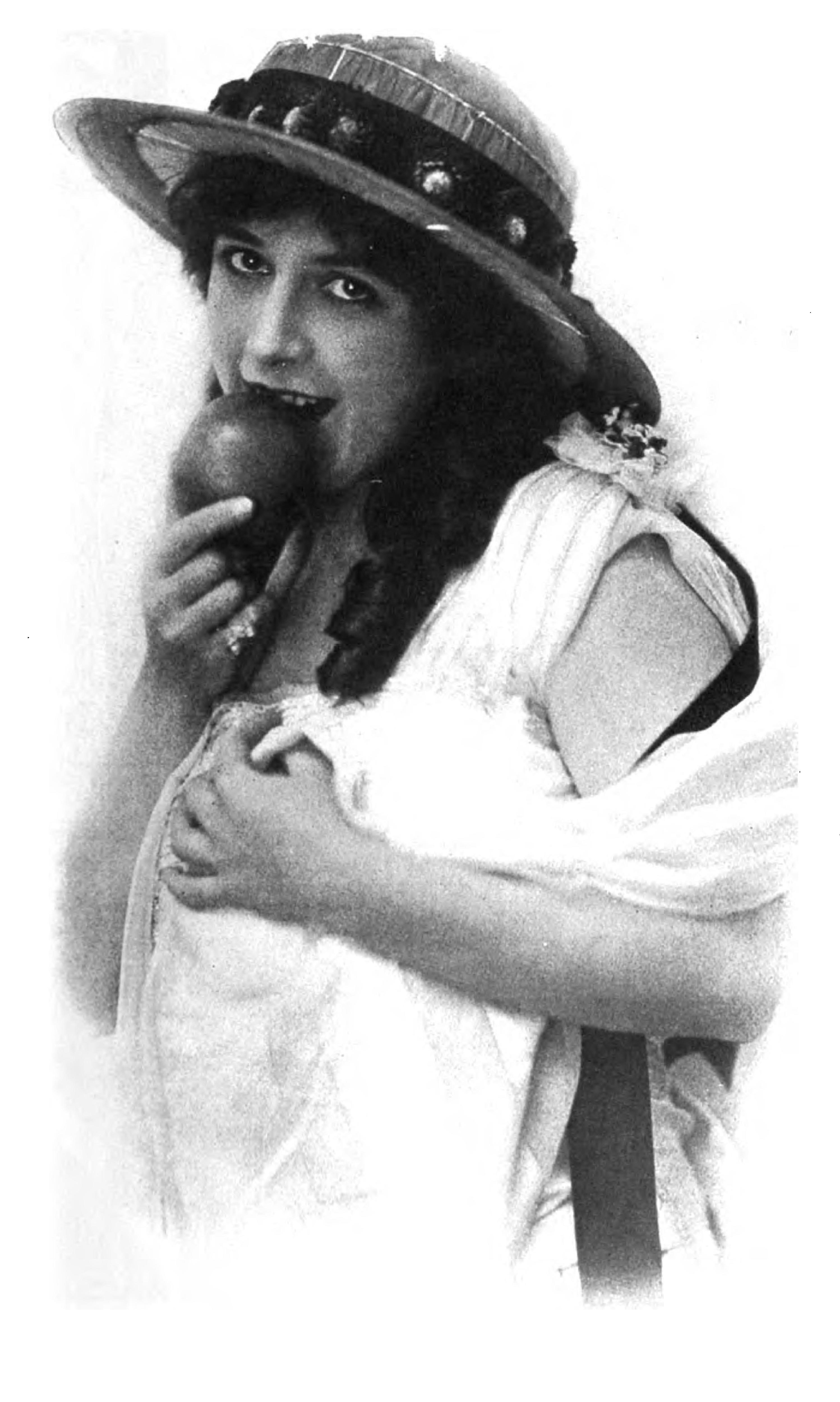
Phillips featured in Motion Picture Magazine, 1915

Year	Title	Role	Notes
1911	His Friend's Wife		Short, Uncredited; Lost film
1911	The Rosary	Ruth Martin	Short; Lost film
1911	Her Dad the Constable	Mary Perkins	Short; Lost film
1911	The Gordian Knot	Marion Walters	Short; Lost film
1911	Saved from the Torrents	Katie Carrington	Short; Lost film
1911	Fate's Funny Frolic	Alice Trevor	Short; Lost film
1911	A False Suspicion	Marion Walters	Short; Lost film
1913	The Unburied Past	Margaret Phillips	Short; Lost film
1913	The Power of Conscience	Dora Gordon	Short; Lost film
1914	In All Things Moderation	Mary Graham - the Oldest Daughter	Short; Lost film
1914	Three Men Who Knew	Mrs. Watson	Short; Lost film
1915	The Affair of the Terrace	Jasmine Roberts	Short; Lost film
1915	The Trail of the Upper Yukon	Marcia	Short; Lost film
1916	Ambition		Lost film
1916	The Mark of Cain	Doris	Alternative title: By Fate's Degree; Lost film
1916	If My Country Should Call	Margaret Ardrath	Incomplete film
1916	The Place Beyond the Winds	Priscilla Glenn	Incomplete film
1916	The Price of Silence	Helen Urmy	
1917	The Piper's Price	Amy Hadley	Lost film
1917	Hell Morgan's Girl	Lola	Lost film
1917	The Girl in the Checkered Coat	Mary Graham "Flash" Fan	Lost film
1917	The Flashlight	Delice Brixton	Alternative title: The Flashlight Girl; Lost film
1917	A Doll's House	Nora Helmer	Lost film
1917	Fires of Rebellion	Madge Garvey	Lost film
1917	The Rescue	Anne Wetherall	Lost film
1917	Pay Me!	Marta	Alternative titles: Pay Day; The Vengeance of the West; Incomplete film
1917	Triumph	Nell Baxter	Incomplete film
1917	Bondage	Elinor Crawford	Lost film
1918	The Grand Passion	Viola Argos	Lost film
1918	Broadway Love	Midge O'Hara	
1918	The Risky Road	Marjorie Helmer	
1918	A Soul for Sale	Neila Pendleton	
1918	The Mortgaged Wife	Gloria Carter	
1918	The Talk of the Town	Genevra French	Directed by Allen Holubar, her husband Lost film
1918	The Heart of Humanity	Nanette	Directed by Allen Holubar
1919	Destiny	Mary Burton	Lost film
1919	The Right to Happiness	Sonia & Vivian - Twin Sisters	
1919	Paid in Advance	Joan Gray	
1920	Once to Every Woman	Aurora Meredith	Lost film
1921	Man, Woman & Marriage	Victoria	
1922	Hurricane's Gal	Lola	
1922	The World's a Stage	Jo Bishop	Lost film
1923	Slander the Woman	Yvonne Desmarest	Lost film
1923	The Unknown Purple		Uncredited; Lost film
1925	Every Man's Wife	Mrs. Bradin	Lost film
1925	The Sporting Chance	Patricia Winthrop	Lost film
1925	Without Mercy	Mrs. Enid Grant	
1926	The Bar-C Mystery	Jane Cortelyou	Lost film
1926	The Gay Deceiver	Claire	Lost film
1926	Upstage	Miss Weaver	
1926	Remember	Ruth Pomeroy	Incomplete film
1927	Women Love Diamonds	Mrs. Flaherty	
1927	The Broken Gate	Aurora Lane	Lost film
1927	Cradle Snatchers	Kitty Ladd	Directed by Howard Hawks; Incomplete film
1930	The Jazz Cinderella	Mrs. Consuelo Carter	Alternative title: Love Is Like That
1934	Now I'll Tell	Mrs. Farth	(scenes deleted)
1936	Thank You, Jeeves!	Boy's mother	Uncredited
1937	Hot Water	Nurse	Uncredited
1940	And One Was Beautiful	Gertrude's maid	Uncredited
1942	My Favorite Spy	Woman at wedding	Uncredited
1942	Boston Blackie Goes Hollywood	Old Lady at Radio	Uncredited
1943	The Cross of Lorraine	Village woman	Uncredited
1944	Mrs. Parkington	Leaping Rock Pedestrian	Uncredited
1946	The Postman Always Rings Twice	Nurse	Uncredited
1949	The Reckless Moment	Woman	Uncredited
1950	Father of the Bride	Woman in Nightmare Sequence	Uncredited
1951	Man in the Saddle	Townswoman	Uncredited
1955	Violent Saturday	Bank customer	Uncredited
1955	How to Be Very, Very Popular		Uncredited
1956	The Man in the Gray Flannel Suit	Mr. Hopkins' maid	Uncredited
1962	The Man Who Shot Liberty Valance	Townswoman	Uncredited
