= New Caledonia escapees in Australia =

Édouard Manet's 1881 painting Rochefort's Escape shows Henri Rochefort and five other communards rowing towards an Australian three-master, waiting to pick them up and take them to Australia.

New Caledonia escapees in Australia were convicts who escaped the French penal colony of New Caledonia by sailing west across the Coral Sea to Queensland or, less frequently, New South Wales. Penal transportation to New Caledonia lasted between 1864 and 1898, during which time hundreds of escapees made for Australia's eastern seaboard—at least 1,200 km distant—often on stolen vessels or makeshift rafts, or as stowaways. The journey often proved hazardous, and many escapees perished during the attempt. A small number of escapees, mostly political prisoners, were also smuggled into the country aboard Australian vessels.

The French government sought to copy the successes of Britain's Australian penal colonies in New Caledonia, which replaced French Guiana as France's primary destination for bagnards (exiled convicts) in 1867, the same year that the last British convict ship left for Australia. The presence of a new penal colony to the northeast became a source of unease for Australians seeking to move on from their own convict past, as well as a security concern once escapees began landing on what was then a sparsely inhabited coastline, allowing them to enter the country unobserved. Some survived as swagmen and station hands, while a smaller number managed to reinvent themselves and assume more prominent positions in Australian society. Others returned to a life of crime and were extradited once caught. The threat posed by these récidivistes became a constant irritant to Australia–France relations and helped shape a nascent Australian foreign policy independent of that of Britain's. The moral panic over these escapees also helped the Australian colonies transcend their own penal past as convict settlements, escape the taint of British convict transportation, and assert their respectability.

== Escape route ==
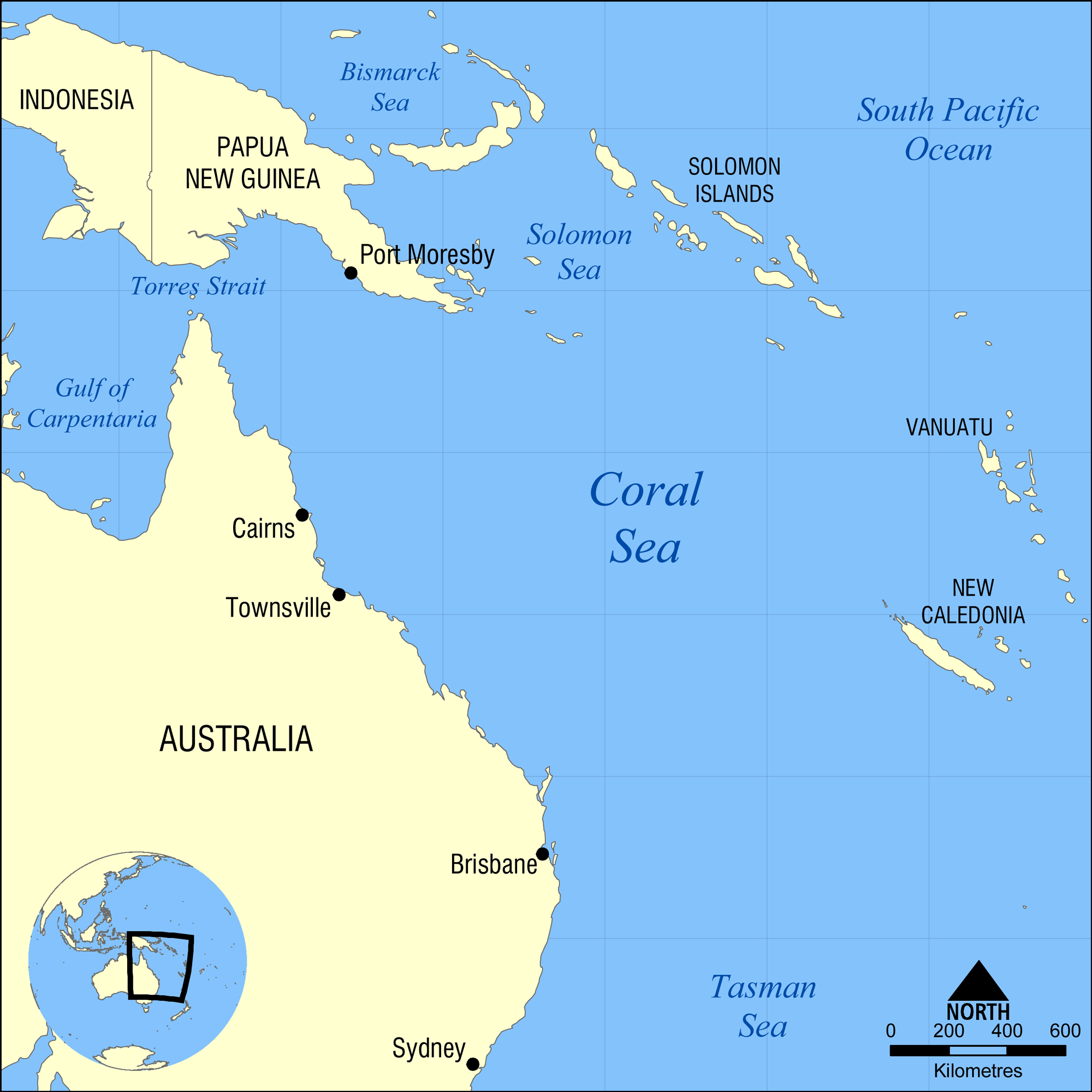
Map of the Coral Sea showing eastern Australia and New Caledonia

Named for its myriad coral reef systems, the Coral Sea in the southwestern Pacific encompasses the islands of Melanesia, including New Caledonia, an archipelago that lies approximately 1,200 km to the east of the sea's western boundary, the east coast of Queensland, Australia.

== History ==
=== Communards ===
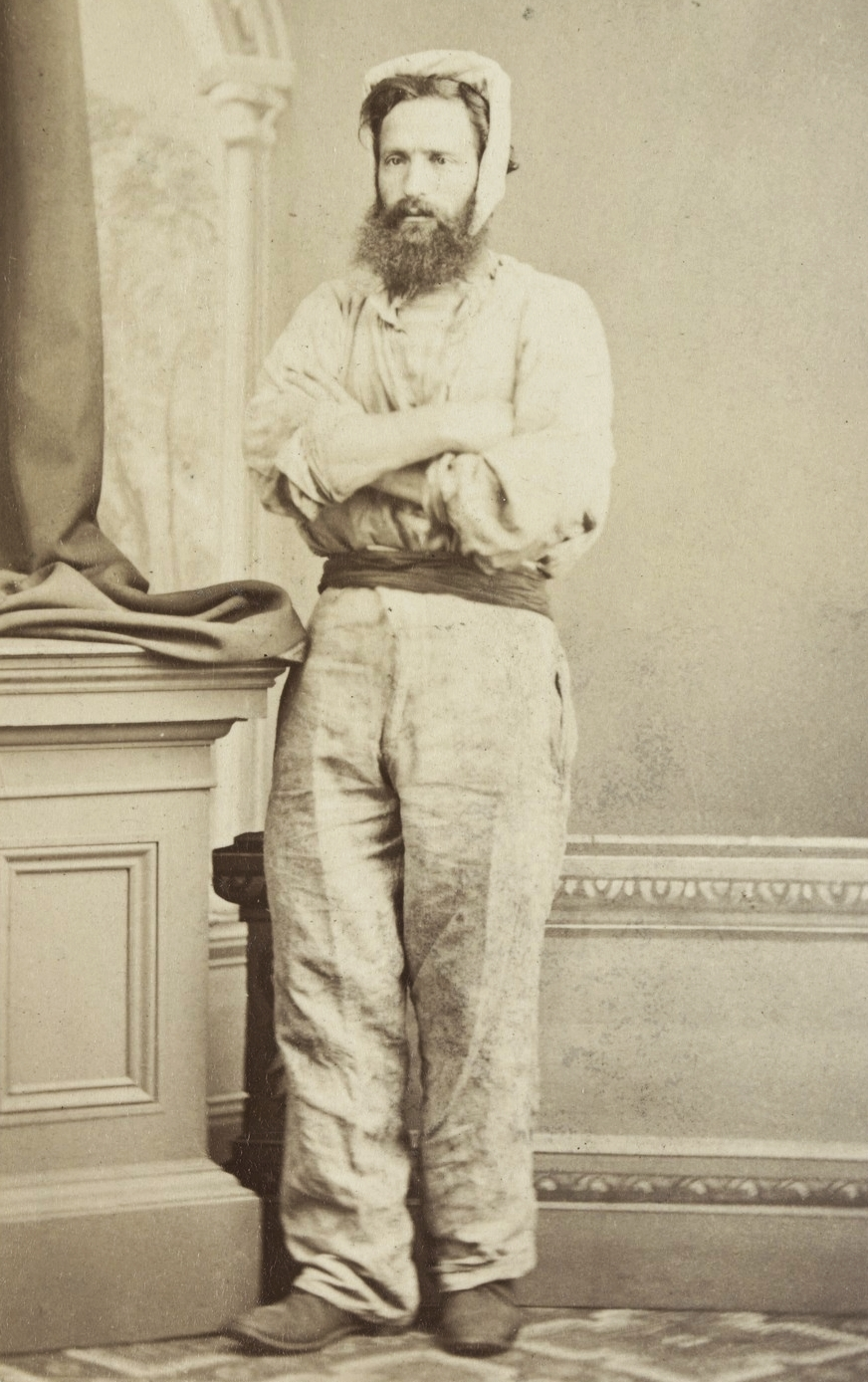
Michel Seringue, the first communard to escape to Australia, photographed in Melbourne in 1873

One of the first transports carrying communards to New Caledonia, the L'Orne, called into Melbourne on 19 April 1873 with most of her 549 prisoners requiring treatment for scurvy and other illnesses. Despite heavy surveillance, communard Michel Sérigné managed to lower himself out of the side of the ship and swim to shore, where a French accomplice took him to meet writer and journalist Marcus Clarke, by then famous for his deeply critical account of the Australian convict system, His Natural Life (1870–72). Writing for The Argus, Clarke helped bring wider attention in Australia to the plight of Sérigné and the communards. Later that year, French authorities ordered convict ships to bypass Australian ports after Melbourne's waterfront workers protested against the conditions the communards were subjected to.

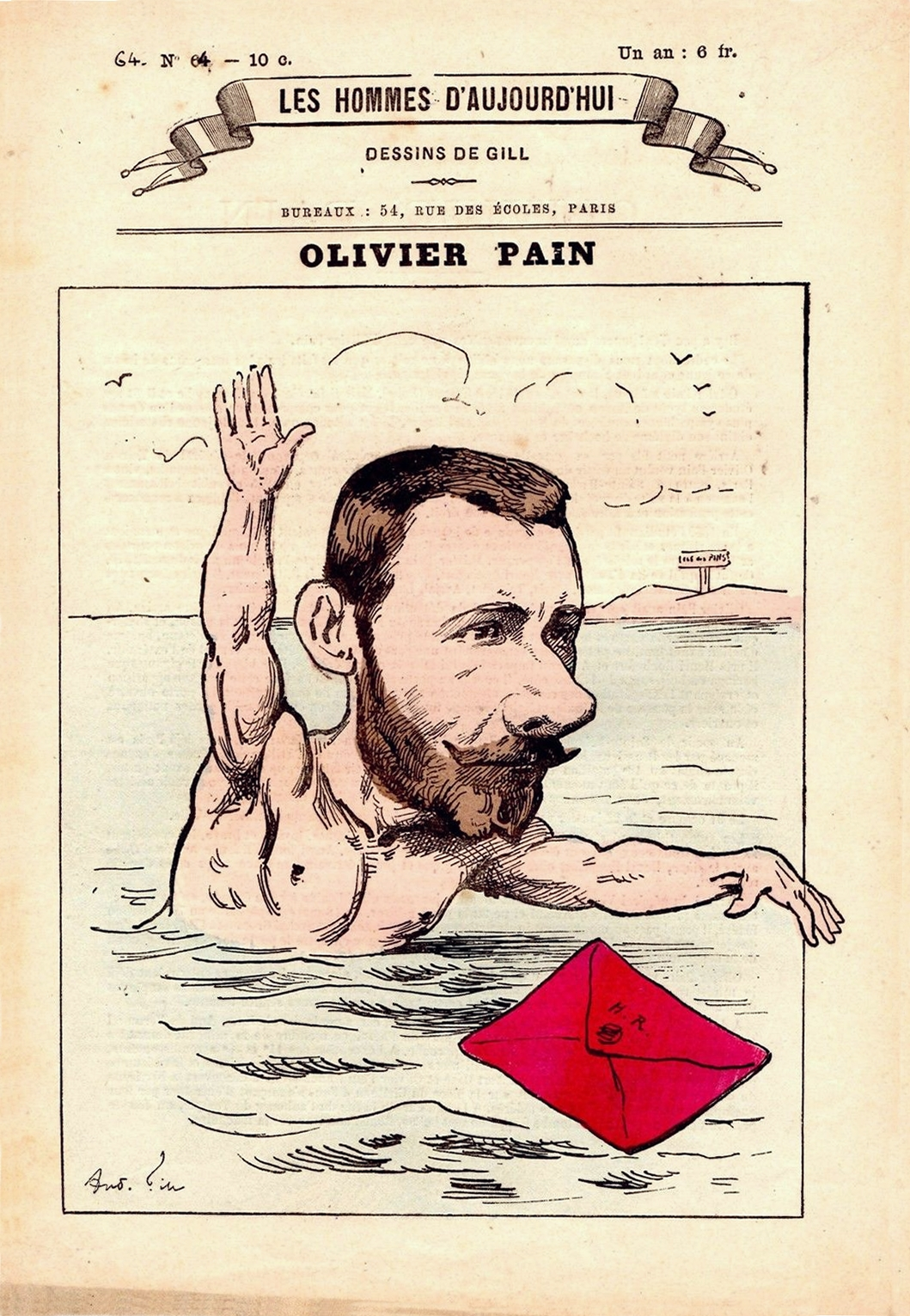
A caricature of communard Olivier Pain, who escaped to Australia in 1874

The first communard to successfully escape to Queensland arrived in September 1873 as a stowaway on an Australian vessel. More communards arrived in Queensland and New South Wales over the following months, and accounts of their escapes became a regular feature in the Australian press. In most cases, the police refused to interfere, and the communards were "set at liberty". The best-known escape occurred in March 1874 and involved noted journalist Henri Rochefort and five other communards, including Paschal Grousset and Achille Ballière. Rochefort hatched the plot with Captain Law, of the three-master collier P. C. E. (Peace, Comfort and Ease), who agreed to pick them up in the waters outside Nouméa. From there, they were taken to Law's hometown, the coal port of Newcastle, New South Wales, and later to Sydney, where they were fêted, the Sydney Morning Herald conceding: "The Parisian Communists have this excuse, that what they did was not done in a time of profound peace, but in a time of almost anarchy." Rochefort published an account of their Australian sojourn in 1877.

Inspired by Rochefort's escape, other prominent communards tried reaching Australia, often without success. Louise Michel was forced to abandon her attempt due to a cyclone, and in March 1875, Paul Philémon Rastoul and nineteen other communards drowned after their makeshift boat fell apart. Rastoul's wife Juliette, was caught assisting in the escape of communards and deported to Sydney, where she stayed and remarried to fellow communard exile and artist Lucien Henry.

== Legacy ==
=== Australia–France relations ===
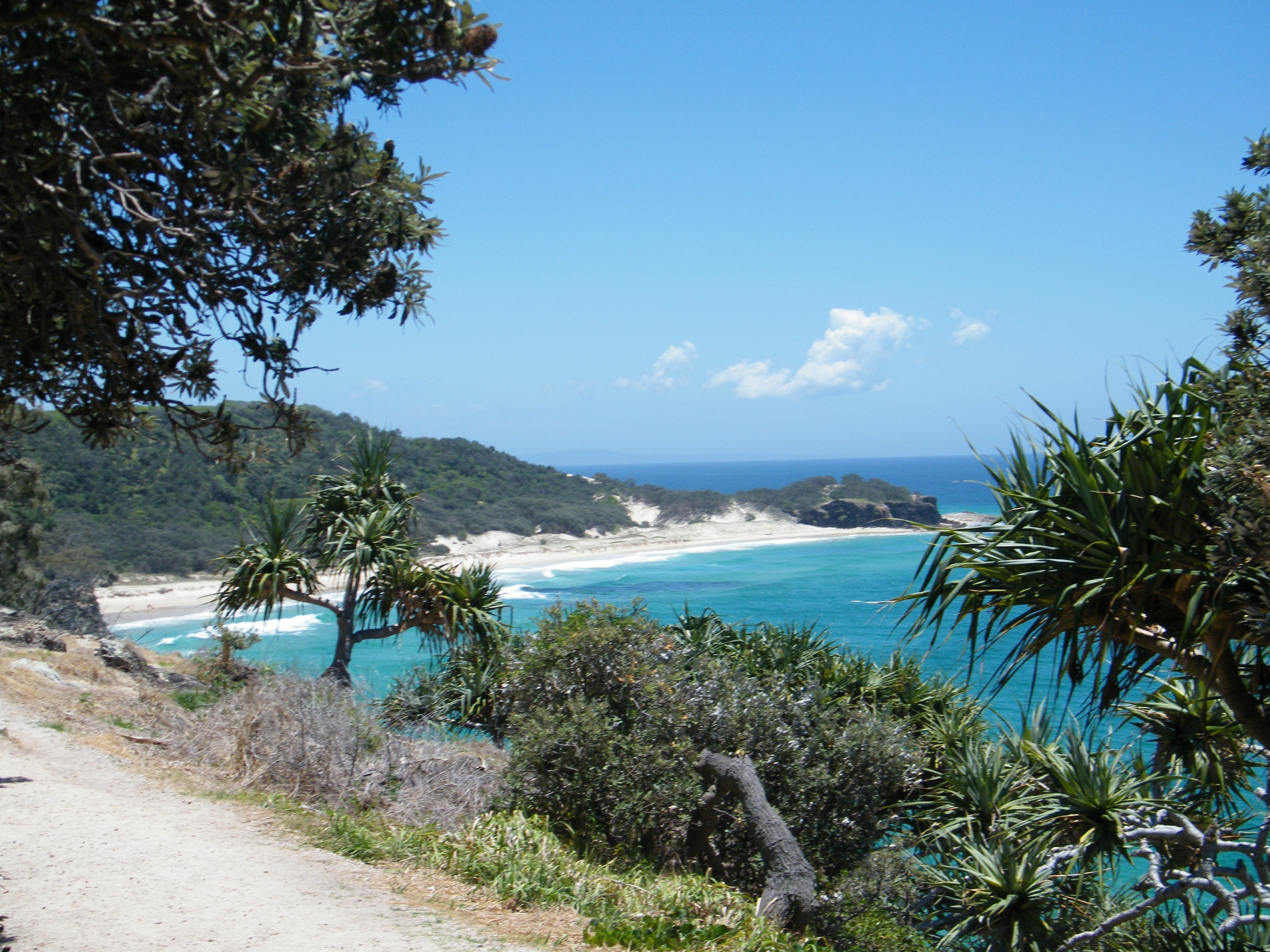
Frenchman's Beach, Stradbroke Island, named after New Caledonia escapees who landed there in 1881

=== Cultural depictions ===
Alfred Dampier's play Voices of the Night (1886) includes a communard in Sydney who falls in love with a local girl. Fergus Hume's 1888 novel Madame Midas follows two New Caledonian escapees who join Australian society after passing themselves off as shipwrecked sailors. Published that same year, Henry Pettitt's melodrama Hands Across the Sea tells a story of a farmer who is transported to New Caledonia for a murder he did not commit. He escapes in an open boat before being rescued by a man-of-war and taken to Sydney. It was adapted into a 1912 Australian film of the same name, directed by Gaston Mervale and starring Louise Lovely.

Algerian author Anouar Benmalek's 2000 novel The Child of an Ancient People describes the escape of a French communard and An Arab prince aboard a vessel carrying an orphan Tasmanian Aboriginal. From North Queensland, they travel to Victoria in search of the orphan's relatives.

== See also ==
- Convicts in Australia

== Bibliography ==
Books

- Aldrich, Robert; McKenzie, Kristen (2013). The Routledge History of Western Empires. Routledge. ISBN 9781317999874.
- Boyer, Allen D.; Bullard, Alice (2000). Exile to Paradise: Savagery and Civilization in Paris and the South Pacific, 1790–1900. Stanford University Press. ISBN 9780804738781.
- Cahill, Rowan J.; Irving, Terence H.; Irving, Terry (2010). Radical Sydney: Places, Portraits and Unruly Episodes. UNSW Press. ISBN 9781742230931.

Journals

- Brennan, Russell; Richards, Jonathan (2014). "'The Scum of French Criminals and Convicts': Australia and New Caledonia Escapees". History Compass. 12 (7). Wiley-Blackwell: 559–566. doi:10.1111/hic3.12171.
- Donohoo, Jill (2013). "Australian Reactions to the French Penal Colony in New Caledonia" (PDF). Explorations. 54.
- Dutton, Kenneth R. (2002). "Henri Rochefort and his Companions in Australia" (PDF). Explorations (32). The French Australian Review.
- McGowan, Barry (2017). "Marcus Clarke and Felix Meyer's cameo roles in the Paris Commune" (PDF). La Trobe Journal (99). State Library of Victoria.
- McGowan, Barry (2018). "Convicts and Communards: French-Australian Relations in the South Pacific, 1800–1900" (PDF). The French Australian Review (64).
