= P. W. Marony =

Australian painter and political cartoonist

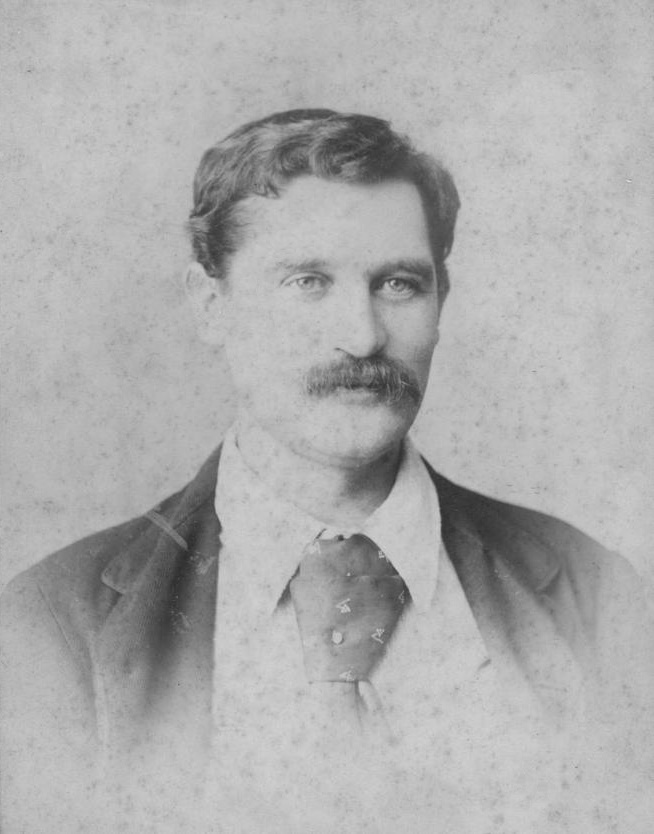
- Marony in 1890
- Born: Patrick William Marony c. April 4, 1859; County Waterford, Ireland
- Died: 14 January 1939 (aged 81); Manly, New South Wales
- Known for: Painting, political cartooning, photography, writing

Patrick William Marony (bapt. 4 Apr 1859 – 14 Jan 1939), known professionally as P. W. Marony, was an Australian painter, political cartoonist, photographer and writer. Marony's practice as an artist and a writer spanned the period of cultural transition from the popularity of history painting to the emergence of cinematic versions of history. He painted a series of bushranger-themed works which were exhibited in the mid-1890s. Marony wrote several film scripts for the Australian Life Biograph Company. Twenty-six of his oil paintings, mostly of bushrangers, are a part of the collection of the National Library of Australia.

== Biography ==
=== Family details ===
Patrick William Marony was born at or near Portlaw, County Waterford, Ireland, in 1859 to John Charles Moroney, a publican, and Johanna (née Walsh).

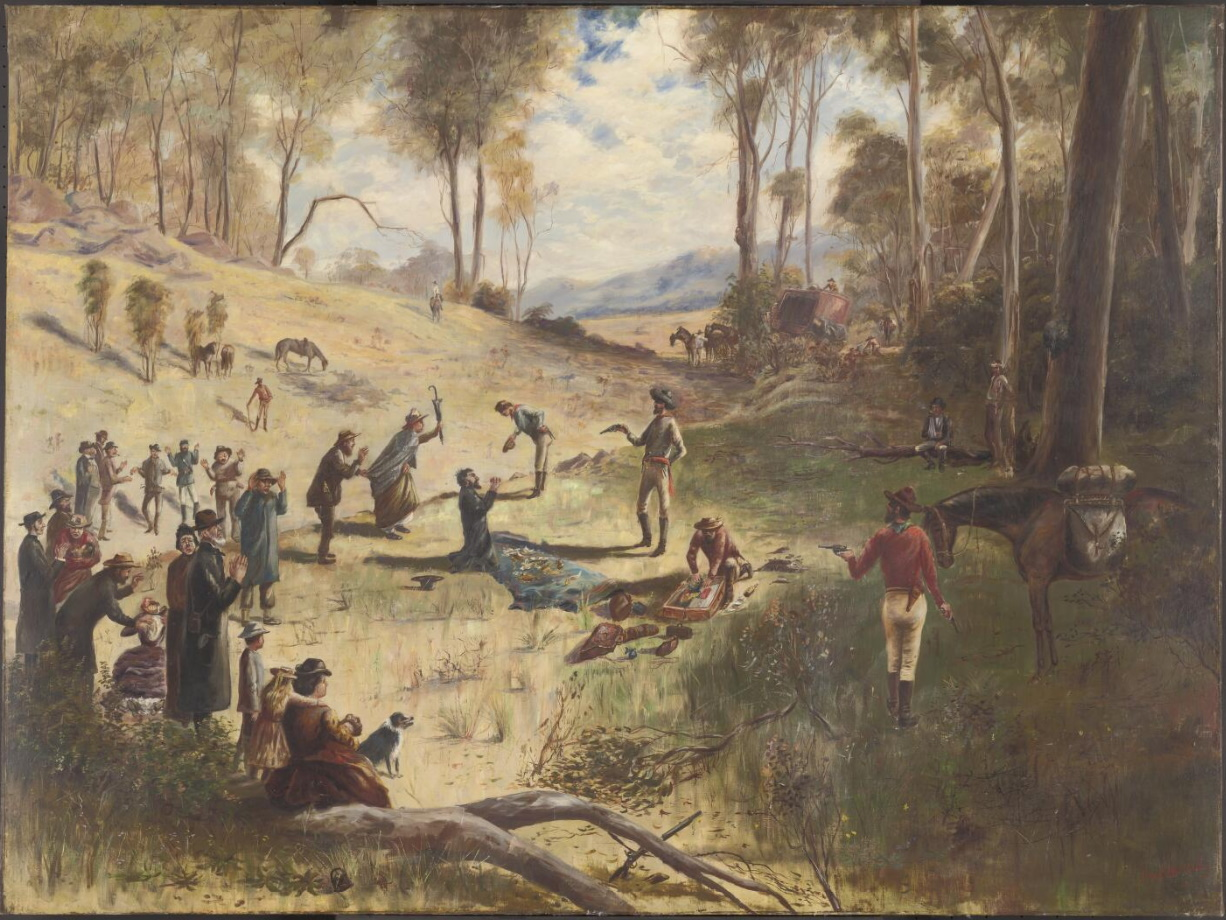
'Bushrangers holding up coach passengers', oil painting by P. W. Marony, completed in about 1894.

As a young man Marony was educated in a seminary in Dublin. By 1883 he had emigrated to Australia, accompanied by his brother, John Martin Marony. In April 1883 Marony travelled from Brisbane to Sydney by coastal steamer. Patrick Marony and Rebecca Mason were married in 1883 in Sydney. The couple had three children, Muriel Mary, born in 1884 at Glebe, New South Wales, Redmond, born in 1887 at Narrabri, and Sylvia, born in about 1893 at Orange.

In about September 1888 Marony exhibited a portrait he had painted of Hugh Taylor, the member for Parramatta. A group of Taylor's friends purchased the picture and presented it to the politician as a gift.

=== Bushranger paintings ===
Marony spent seven or eight years devoted to his bushranging paintings (from about 1886 to 1894). He assiduously attempted to ensure the accuracy of his representations, with faces painted from photographs where possible and the depicted scenes of action from the actual locations. During the planning and execution of his various paintings it was reported that Marony "made a personal inspection of the scenes of the different events, and collected from eye-witnesses and other available sources the fullest information he could".

In June 1894 over thirty of his bushranger paintings, described as "graphic illustrations of what might be called the 'Australian reign of terror'" were exhibited in the Austral Gallery in the Strand Arcade, Sydney. The subjects represented in the paintings by Maroney, described as "the leading artist of Orange", included the raid on Bathurst by Gilbert’s gang, the Eugowra gold escort robbery, the death of Starlight, the sticking-up of a mail coach, the death of Ben Hall, the capture of Ned Kelly and the siege of Glenrowan.

=== Political cartoons ===
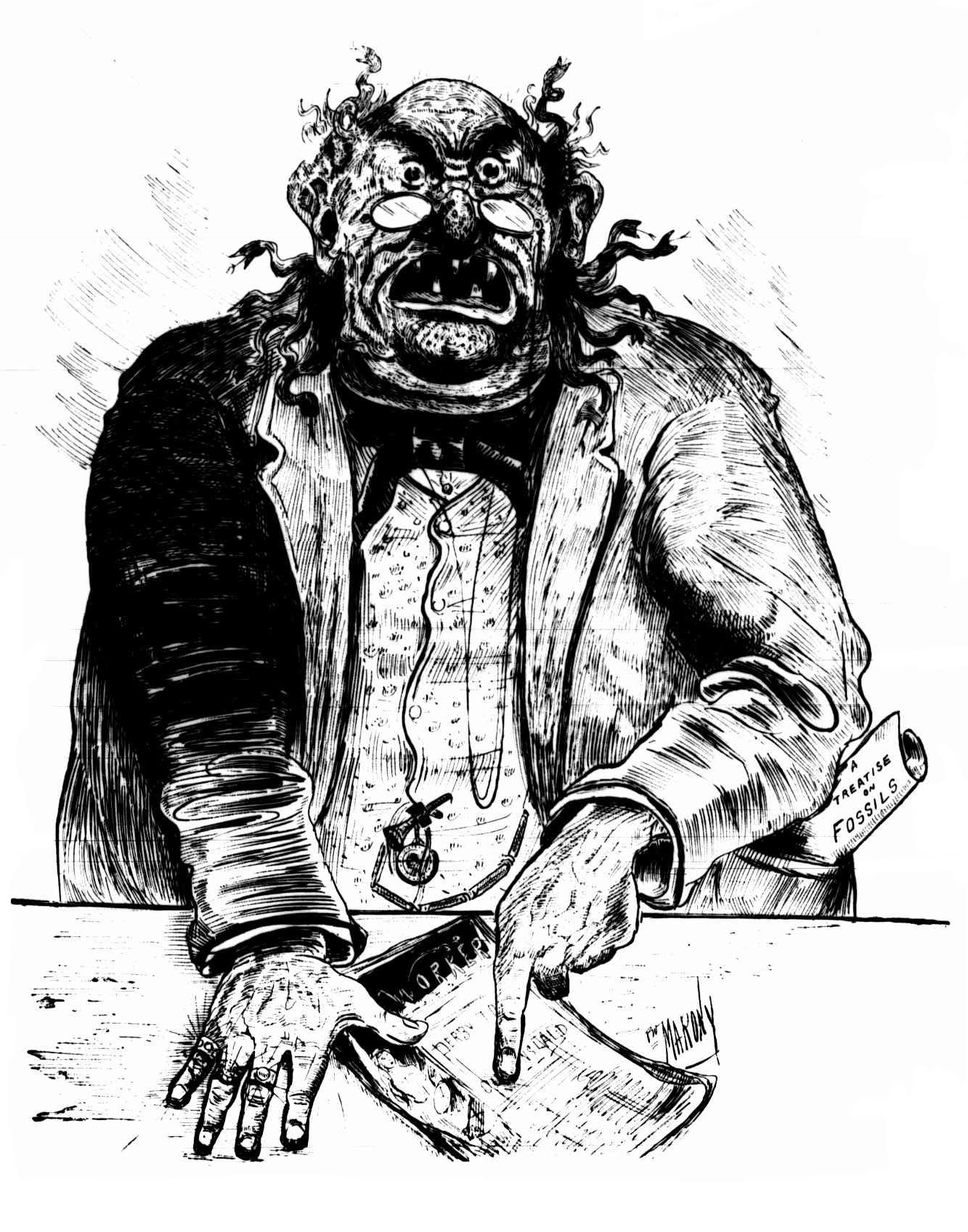
'The Gentleman Who Objects to The Worker', cover illustration of The Worker (Brisbane) by P. W. Marony, 21 April 1900.

In 1900 three full-page cartoons by P. W. Marony were published in The Worker newspaper, printed in Brisbane, with one of them used as the front cover illustration. At that time The Worker was the official journal of the Australian Labor Party in Queensland. His cartoons have been described in the following terms: "Although crude and amateurish in style (like his paintings), they are quite lively and distinctive".

Two later political cartoons by P. W. Marony are held by the State Library of Queensland, dated at about 1916. One cartoon depicts Prime Minister Hughes overseeing the herding of waterside workers into a conscription depot.

=== New Hebrides ===
In 1902 Marony was amongst a group of eighteen Australian settlers, recruited by Burns, Philp and Co., who went to the New Hebrides (now Vanuatu) aboard the steamship Mambare and took up land on the island of Espiritu Santo. The S.S. Mambare departed in May 1902 and travelled to the New Hebrides via Lord Howe Island and Norfolk Island. Also aboard was A. B. Paterson, reporting on the settlement scheme as a correspondent for the Sydney Morning Herald. The settlers were granted blocks of land from 300 to 1,000 acres on nominal terms, intending to grow mainly maize and coconuts. Marony selected a block on the south coast of the island, close to the Presbyterian mission on nearby Tangoa Island.

After about three years Marony sold his block to an Englishman named Dalrymple. Marony and his family moved to Port Vila for a short period, during which Marony went on a three months' cruise around the island group in the schooner, The Albatross, owned by Roberts, a planter on Mele Island.

On his return to Australia, Marony wrote an article about Norfolk Island (published in December 1905), supporting the economic viability of the resettled Pitcairn Islanders (descendants of Tahitians and the HMS Bounty mutineers). He also wrote about the New Hebrides; two articles, illustrated by his own photographs, were published in February 1906 in the Sydney Mail and New South Wales Advertiser. The articles feature information about the Australian and French colonists in the island group, agricultural prospects and observations about the customs of the native inhabitants.

In October 1908 a short story by P. W. Marony was published entitled 'A Romance of Santo Island', set in the New Hebrides.

=== Film screenplays ===
P. W. Marony wrote the film scripts for three silent films made by the Australian Life Biograph Company and released in 1911, including the film production company's first release:

- A Tale of the Australian Bush (directed by Gaston Mervale), the company's first film, initially released as Ben Hall, the Notorious Bushranger in March 1911; a film about the bushranger Ben Hall, "one of the most daring and unfortunate of those misguided men".
- One Hundred Years Ago (directed by Gaston Mervale), released in May 1911; an Anglo-Australian romantic drama, involving an innocent man imprisoned on Norfolk Island and a “woman’s undying love”.
- A Ticket in Tatts (directed by Gaston Mervale), released in June 1911; a melodrama with a horse-racing and gambling theme, involving the hero believing that he committed murder before the truth is ultimately revealed.

=== Artistic pursuits ===
Patrick W. Marony was a member of the Royal Art Society of New South Wales and exhibited with them in 1907, 1908, 1909 and 1912.

In December 1912 an exhibition of Marony's paintings was held in George-street, Sydney; the paintings featured "Australian and S[outh] S[ea] Island Scenes".

In January 1913 Marony exhibited about eighty of his works in premises in William-street, Bathurst, next door to the Royal Hotel. The collection was made up of watercolour and oil paintings, as well as works in pastel. The theme of the exhibition was Australian landscapes which included "exquisite impressions of bush, sea, plain, and mountain". One large painting depicted the Katoomba Falls. The paintings were available for sale by auction.

In May 1924 Marony held an exhibition in the Victoria Theatre, Kempsey, of his watercolour paintings of "beauty spots of the North Coast".

=== Later years ===
By 1930 Marony was living in Manly, New South Wales. Patrick William Marony died on 14 January 1939 at his home in Manly, aged 81 years. Marony was cremated; his ashes were scattered in the Four Winds Garden in the Northern Suburbs Crematorium in Sydney.
