= A Daughter of Australia =

A Daughter of Australia may refer to:

- A Daughter of Australia (1912 film), an Australian silent film directed by Gaston Mervale
- A Daughter of Australia (1922 film), an Australian silent film directed by Lawson Harris
