= A Ticket in Tatts =

A Ticket in Tatts may refer to:

- A Ticket in Tatts (1934 film), a 1934 musical comedy starring George Wallace
- A Ticket in Tatts (1911 film), a 1911 Australian silent film directed by Gaston Mervale
