= The Wreck of the Dunbar or The Yeoman's Wedding =

- The Sun 9 June 1912
- Directed by: Gaston Mervale
- Written by: P.W. Marony
- Starring: Louise Lovely
- Production company: Universal Films Ltd
- Release date: 1912
- Running time: 3,500 feet
- Country: Australia
- Languages: Silent film; English intertitles

The Wreck of the Dunbar or The Yeoman's Wedding is a 1912 Australian silent film directed by Gaston Mervale starring Louise Lovely. The plot concerns the shipwreck of the Dunbar, one of Australia's worst maritime disasters. It is considered a lost film.

== Plot ==
Jack Glenster, son of Farmer Glenster, is in love with Dorothy, daughter of the squire. She rejects a marriage proposal from her cousin, Ralph, and decides to elope with Jack.

The two leave England and are married by a friendly blacksmith. Dorothy's father finds out and disineheits her. Jack's father falls behind on his rent.

Jack leaves Dorothy with his parents and travels to Australia on a ship also carrying Ralph. Ralph, heavily in debt, had tried to steal from the squire, been caught in the act, and ordered to leave.

In Australia, Jack makes his fortune. His wife and parents sail out to Sydney on the Dunbar. Jack travels to Sydney to meet them. He is held up by bushrangers, who include Ralph, who is killed by Winnie, the squatter's daughter.

The Dunbar crashes on the rocks outside Sydney and only one survivor lives. Jack rescues the sole survivor and finds out he is the squire's old servant, who brings a message of forgiveness. Jack discovers his wife and parents did not sail on the Dunbar after all and returns home to be reunited with them.

A contemporary advertisement claimed the film featured the following scenes:

- the Old English home;
- the Love Intense;
- the terrific struggle, man to man;
- two thrilling Australian Scenes;
- the terrible gap;
- the doomed ship;
- the wreck of the Dunbar in all its awful realism;
- the rescue of the sole survivor;
- the daring feat performed on the actual spot.

"The Yeoman's Wedding" was "the romance surrounding the wreck".

== Cast ==
Referee 29 May 1912

- Louise Lovely
- Martin Keith

== Production ==
The film was the sole feature produced by Universal Films Ltd, a company formed in Sydney in May 1912 (which had no connection to the Hollywood Studio of the same name). It took over the assets of American Australasian Film Service and Australian Life Biograph Company with the intention of producing and importing movies, and J.S. McCullough to be manager and Sir Albert Gould chairman of directors.

== Reception ==
The film appears to have been successful, running for three weeks in Sydney.

The Sun said the film "is admirable in every way."

The Evening News said "It is an excellent production, and for over an hour It kept many persons interested... Repeatedly there was applause but the scene at the South Head Gap came In for special recognition."

A few years after the film was released the sole survivor of the Dunbar died.
