= Painted Lips =

- Directed by: Edward LeSaint
- Written by: Charles Kenyon
- Produced by: Louise Lovely
- Starring: Louise Lovely; Alfred Allen; Lew Cody
- Cinematography: Friend Baker
- Production company: Universal Pictures
- Distributed by: Universal Pictures
- Release date: February 4, 1918
- Running time: 50 minutes
- Country: United States
- Languages: Silent; English intertitles

Painted Lips is a 1918 American silent drama film directed by Edward LeSaint and starring Louise Lovely, Alfred Allen and Lew Cody.

== Cast ==
- Louise Lovely as Lou McTavish
- Alfred Allen as Capt. McTavish
- Lew Cody as Jim Douglass
- Hector Dion as Andrew Solman
- Beatrice Van as Mrs. Silver
- Betty Schade as Rose
- Mattie Witting as Mrs. Callahan

== Bibliography ==
- Robert B. Connelly. The Silents: Silent Feature Films, 1910-36, Volume 40, Issue 2. December Press, 1998.
