= The Gilded Spider =

1916 film

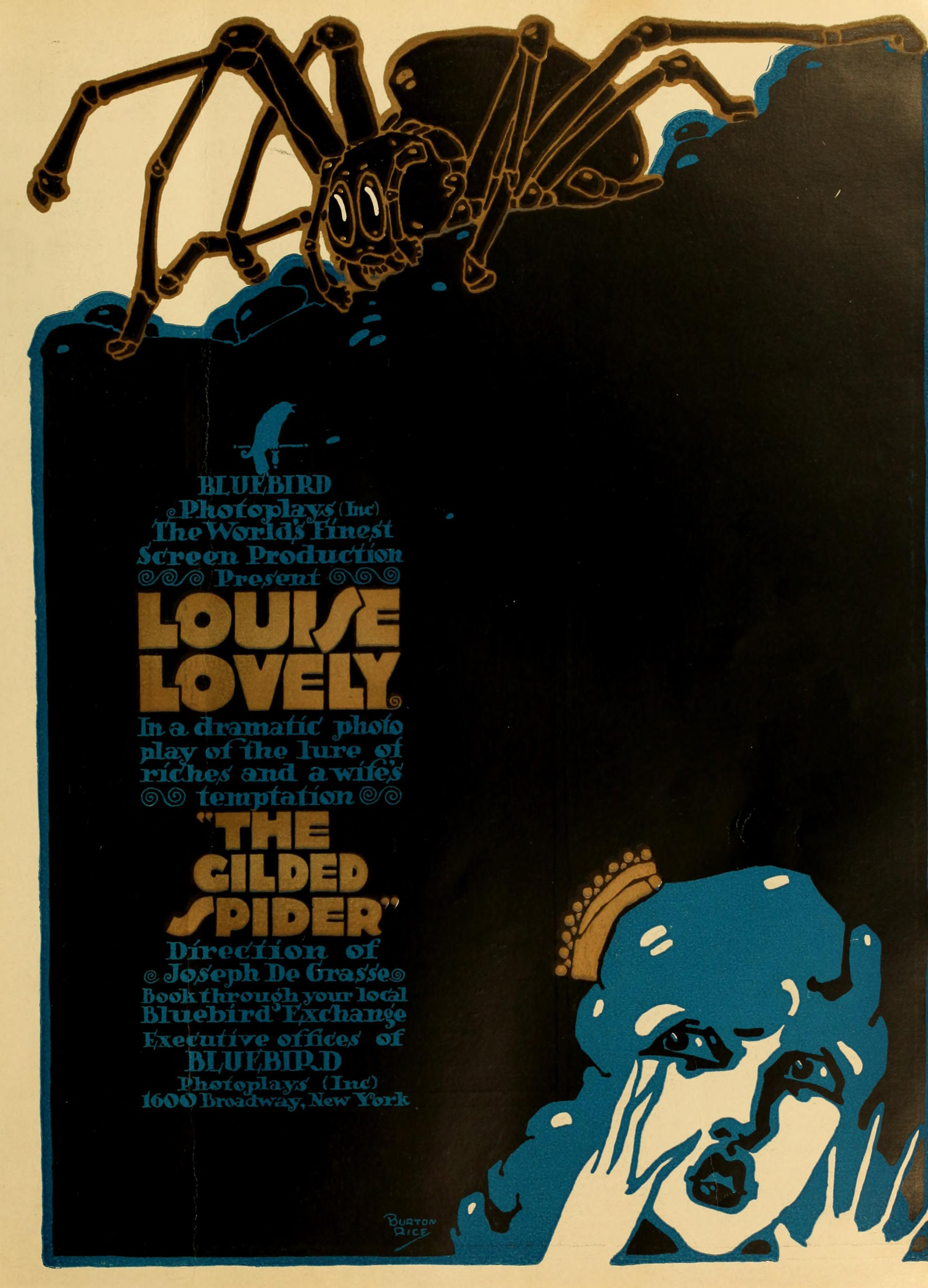
- Advertisement
- Directed by: Joe De Grasse
- Screenplay by: Ida May Park
- Based on: The Full Cup by Ida May Park
- Produced by: Bluebird Film Co.
- Starring: Lon Chaney; Louise Lovely
- Distributed by: Universal Pictures
- Release date: May 8, 1916
- Running time: 5 reels (50 minutes)
- Country: United States
- Languages: Silent; English intertitles

The Gilded Spider is a 1916 American silent drama film directed by Joe De Grasse, written by Ida May Park and starring Lon Chaney and Louise Lovely.

== Plot ==
Giovanni, his wife Leonita, their daughter Elisa and his wife's mother Rosa all live in a small Italian village where Giovanni carves plaster statuettes for a living. An American millionaire named Cyrus Kirkham spots Leonita dancing and becomes obsessed with having her. During an attempt to kidnap her, Leonita jumps off the millionaire's yacht and drowns. When Kirkham goes back to America, he marries a woman named Norma Winston, who was in love with a poor man named Burton Armitage, but she marries Kirkham instead for his money. Armitage later comes into money, but he squanders it all away.

Years pass and Giovanni moves his family to America. Giovanni's daughter Elisa grows up into a young lady and becomes involved with a young artist named Paul Winston, who hires her as a model. Giovanni finds out where Kirkham lives, and plans to kidnap Kirkham's wife Norma and hold her for ransom, but his kidnap plan is foiled. Kirkham suffers a heart attack when he sees Giovanni appear at a party in his home, and when Giovanni sees his daughter Elisa dancing at the party, he loses his sanity, reliving his wife's tragic death in his mind, and jumps off the roof to his death. In the end, with Kirkham dead, Norma winds up marrying her old flame Armitage, and Paul Winston winds up with Elisa.

== Cast ==
- Lon Chaney as Giovanni
- Louise Lovely in a dual role as both Leonita and Elisa (as an adult)
- Lule Warrenton as Rosa (Giovanni's mother-in-law)
- Gilmore Hammond as Cyrus Kirkham, millionaire
- Marjorie Ellison as Norma
- Hayward Mack as Burton Armitage
- Jay Belasco as Paul Winston, the artist

== Reception ==
"The theme here presented is familiar but that might pass unnoticed if it were developed after a better fashion. The principal characters are not as well defined as could be.... Miss Lovely, we must confess, is not what one would associate with the Latin type of woman. She is pretty to the extreme, but her features are anything but Italian. Perhaps though that prettiness will triumph over the casting, it will with the trousered portion of the audience, anyway...Lon Chaney's Giovanni is a strong piece of character portrayal." --- Motion Picture News

"In many ways attractive, blessed with fine types and an excellent cast, THE GILDED SPIDER brings criticism on itself by way of unprofessional construction. The story rambles considerably and gives the impression of being loose-jointed. Louise Lovely...plays well the role of Leonita...Lon Chaney also gives a good impersonation of the Italian." --- Moving Picture World

"Bluebird seems to have the idea that spending a lot of money on a production, with a good cast, is all that is required for the turning out of successful features. The Gilded Spider is a hodge-podge melodrama, expensively visualized...(it) is not on a par with the best Bluebird releases." --- Variety

== Preservation ==
It is unknown whether the film survives as no copies have been located, likely lost.
