= A Tale of the Australian Bush =

1911 film

- Directed by: Gaston Mervale
- Written by: P. W. Marony
- Starring: Godfrey Cass
- Production company: Australian Life Biograph Company
- Release date: 15 March 1911
- Running time: 2,500 feet or 3,000 feet
- Country: Australia
- Languages: Silent; English intertitles

A Tale of the Australian Bush is a 1911 Australian silent film directed by Gaston Mervale. Set in colonial Australia, it was also known as Ben Hall, the Notorious Bushranger and is considered a lost film.

== Plot ==
The story of the bushranger Ben Hall, including his duel with Melville, last stand and death. A contemporary review said that "unlike the usual bushranging films, instead of glorifying the villainy of the criminals of the bush, recorded a triumph of the law over the lawless."

== Cast ==
- A.J. Patrick as Ben Hall
- Godfrey Cassas Melville
- Harry Beaumont as Gilbert
- James Martin as Keightley
- Gilbert Emery as chief of police
- Harrie Ireland as Mrs Keightley
- Isma Owe and Robbie Hall
- Louise Carbasse as Mrs Hall

== Production ==
It was the first film from the production company Australian Life Biograph Company.

== Release ==
The film was first released in Sydney as Ben Hall, the Notorious Bushranger before being screened nationally under the other title.
