= The Poverty of Riches =

1921 film directed by Reginald Barker

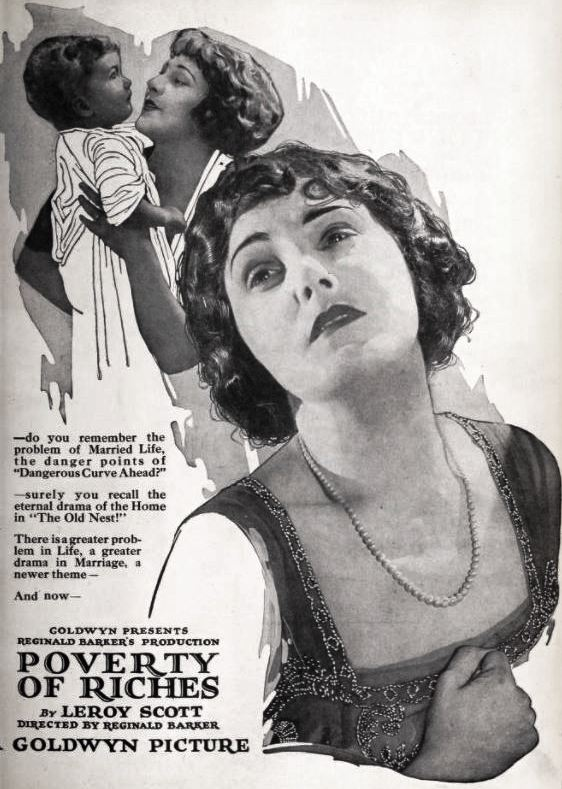
- Directed by: Reginald Barker
- Written by: Arthur F. Statter
- Based on: The Mother by Leroy Scott
- Starring: Richard Dix; Leatrice Joy; Louise Lovely
- Cinematography: Percy Hilburn
- Production company: Goldwyn Pictures
- Distributed by: Goldwyn Pictures
- Release date: November 1921
- Running time: 60 minutes
- Country: United States
- Languages: Silent; English intertitles

The Poverty of Riches is a lost 1921 American silent drama film directed by Reginald Barker and starring Richard Dix, Leatrice Joy and Louise Lovely. It was based on a 1914 short story by Leroy Scott.

== Cast ==
- Richard Dix as John Colby
- Leatrice Joy as Katherine Colby
- John Bowers as Tom Donaldson
- Louise Lovely as Grace Donaldson
- Irene Rich as Mrs. Holt
- DeWitt Jennings as Lyons
- Dave Winter as Stephen Phillips
- Roy Laidlaw as Hendron
- John Cossar as Edward Phillips Sr
- Frankie Lee as John (in prologue)
- Dorothy Hughes as Katherine (in prologue)

== Bibliography ==
- Goble, Alan. The Complete Index to Literary Sources in Film. Walter de Gruyter, 1999.
