= Stronger Than Death (disambiguation) =

Stronger Than Death is an album by Black Label Society.

Stronger Than Death may also refer to:

- Stronger Than Death (1914 film), a film starring Harry Benham
- Stronger Than Death (1915 film), a silent drama starring Lon Chaney Sr.
- Stronger Than Death (1920 film), a film co-directed by Robert Z. Leonard
