= The Measure of a Man (1916 film) =

1915 film by Jack Conway

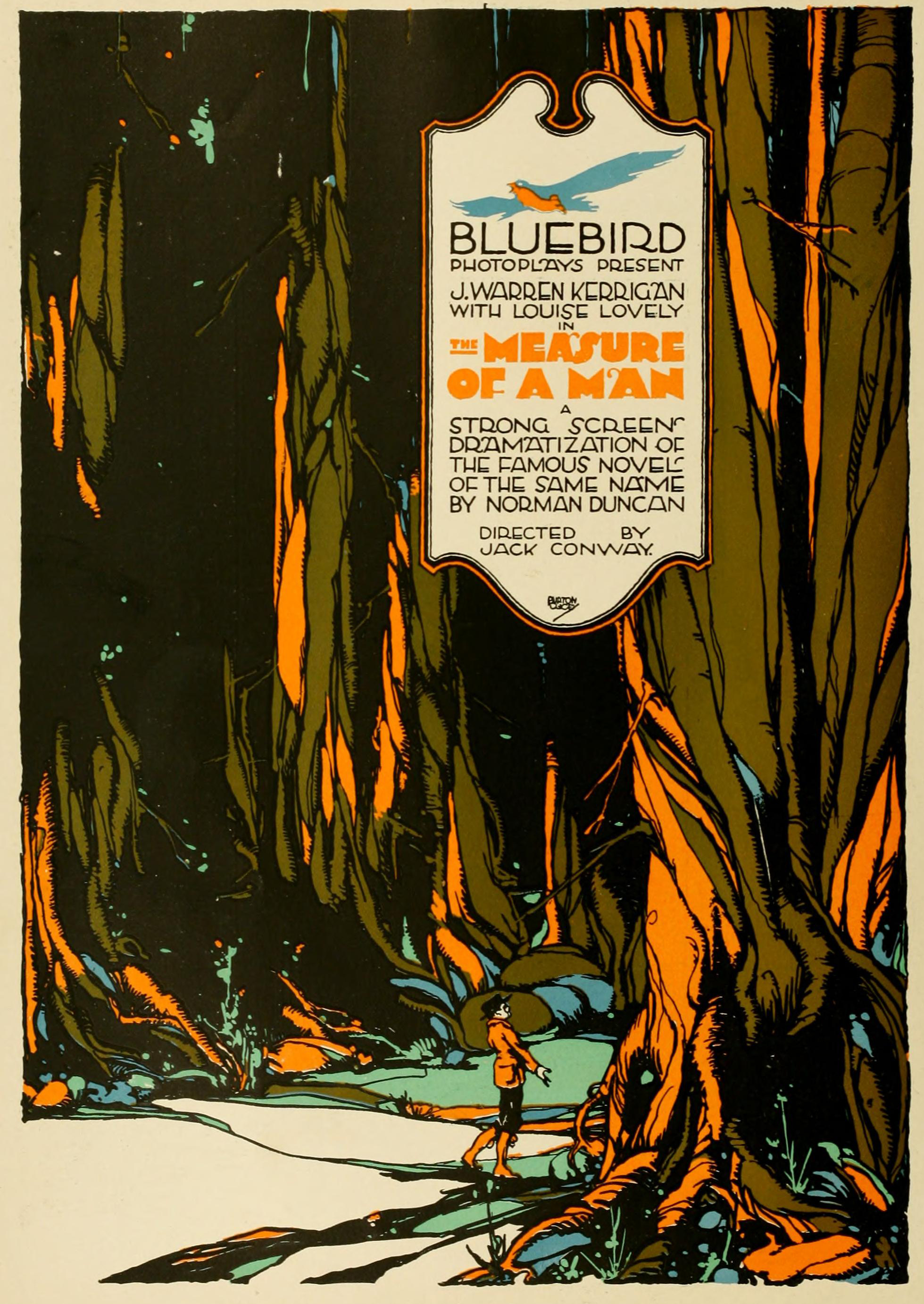
- Directed by: Jack Conway
- Written by: Norman Duncan; Maud Grange
- Starring: J. Warren Kerrigan; Louise Lovely; Katherine Campbell
- Cinematography: Edward A. Kull
- Production company: Universal Pictures
- Distributed by: Universal Pictures
- Release date: November 20, 1916
- Running time: 50 minutes
- Country: United States
- Languages: Silent; English intertitles

The Measure of a Man is a 1916 American silent drama film directed by Jack Conway and starring J. Warren Kerrigan, Louise Lovely and Katherine Campbell.

== Cast ==
- J. Warren Kerrigan as John Fairmeadow
- Louise Lovely as Pattie Batch
- Katherine Campbell as Jenny Hendy
- Ivor McFadden as Billy
- Marion Emmons as Donnie
- Harry Carter as Jack Flack
- Marc B. Robbins as Tom Hendy

== Production ==
The Measure of a Man was shot on location in Eureka, California, centered around the area's lumber mills.

== Bibliography ==
- James Robert Parish & Michael R. Pitts. Film directors: a guide to their American films. Scarecrow Press, 1974.
