= The Little Grey Mouse =

1920 film by James P. Hogan

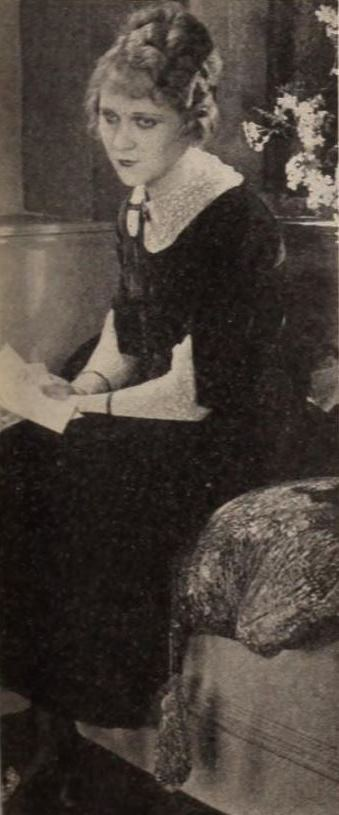
- A still from The Little Grey Mouse (1920) with Louise Lovely
- Directed by: James P. Hogan
- Written by: James P. Hogan (scenario)
- Story by: Barbara La Marr
- Starring: Louise Lovely; Sam De Grasse; Rosemary Theby; Philo McCullough; Clarence Wilson
- Cinematography: L. William O'Connell
- Production company: Fox Film Corporation
- Distributed by: Fox Film Corporation
- Release date: October 31, 1920
- Running time: 5 reels; 50 minutes
- Country: United States
- Languages: Silent film (English intertitles)

The Little Grey Mouse is a 1920 American silent drama film directed by James P. Hogan and starring Louise Lovely, Sam De Grasse, Rosemary Theby, and Philo McCullough. The film was released by Fox Film Corporation on October 31, 1920.

== Cast ==
- Louise Lovely as Beverly Arnold
- Sam De Grasse as John Cumberland
- Rosemary Theby as Hedda Kossiter
- Philo McCullough as Stephen Grey
- Clarence Wilson as Henry Lealor
- Gerard Alexander as Mrs. Lealor (as Mrs. Gerard Alexander)
- Willis Marks as Old John

== Censorship ==
Before The Little Grey Mouse could be exhibited in Kansas, the Kansas Board of Review required the removal of scenes where women are smoking and the scene of nude models in an artist's studio.

== Preservation ==
The film is now considered lost.

== See also ==
- 1937 Fox vault fire
