= Dunbar (1853 ship) =

Sailing ship built in 1853, wrecked in 1857

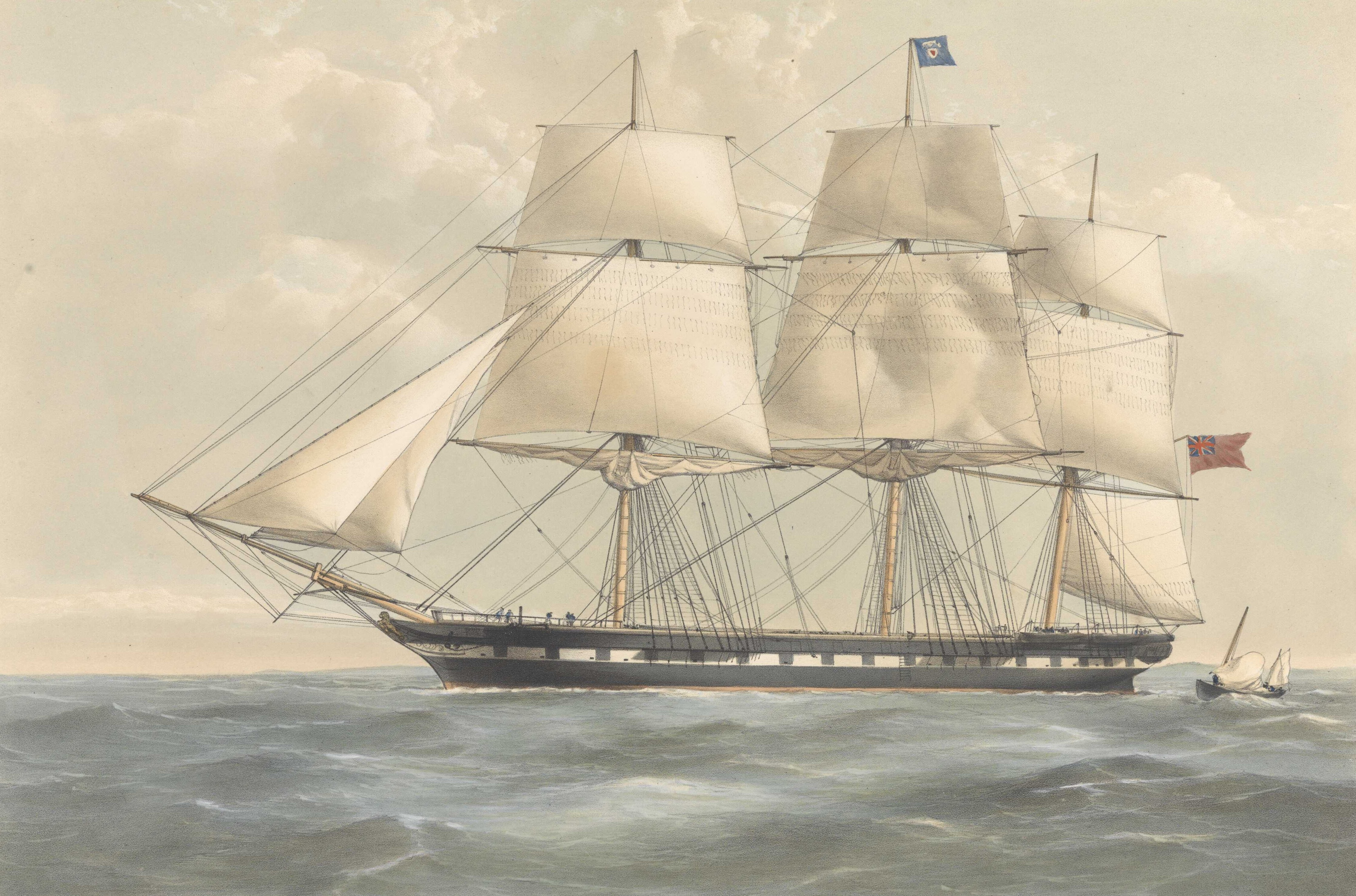
- Lithograph of the Dunbar, by T.G. Dutton.

History
- Name: Dunbar
- Builder: James Laing at Sunderland, England
- Launched: 30 November 1853
- Fate: Wrecked 20 August 1857 near Sydney Heads

General characteristics
- Class & type: Blackwall Frigate
- Tonnage: 1321
- Length: 201.9 ft 10 in (61.79 m)
- Beam: 35 ft 6 in (10.82 m)
- Depth: 22.7 ft 10 in (7.17 m)

New South Wales Heritage Register
- Official name: Dunbar Group
- Type: State heritage (archaeological-maritime)
- Designated: 17 October 2003
- Reference no.: 1675
- Type: Shipwreck
- Category: Transport – Water
- Builders: Ship: James Laing & Sons, Sunderland

The Dunbar was a full-rigged ship designed and built from 1852 to 1853 by James Laing & Sons of Deptford Yard in Sunderland, England and used for maritime trade, as a troop ship and transport. The Dunbar was wrecked near the entrance to Sydney Harbour, Australia in 1857 with the loss of 121 lives. The wreck of the Dunbar ranks as one of Australia's worst maritime disasters, with the event still retained in the social history of Sydney and New South Wales.

The location of the wreck is now a heritage site, at Watsons Bay. An anchor from the Dunbar, a memorial and remains of the 121 onboard are located within Camperdown Cemetery. The property is owned by the NSW Land Registry Services. The site was added to the New South Wales State Heritage Register on 17 October 2003. The Australian National Maritime Museum holds the John Gillies Collection of artefacts from the Dunbar wreck.

== History ==
=== Building and specifications ===
The Dunbar was launched on 30 November 1854 for London shipowner Duncan Dunbar. The Dunbar was a timber three-masted, full-rigged ship built from British Oak and East India Teak. The ship was copper fastened throughout, with iron knees. The figurehead was a rampant lion, copper sheathed, carved by James Brooker of Maryport. The registered tonnage was 1,321 short tons (1,198 t). the length of vessel: 61.5 metres (201.9 ft); breadth: 11 metres (35 ft); depth: 6.9 metres (22.7 ft).

The Dunbar was built as a first class passenger and cargo carrier. Well fitted out throughout, the vessel was, at the time of launching, the largest timber vessel constructed in Sunderland. This was partly in response to the demand for ships to carry passengers to the Australian gold rushes. The Dunbar however was initially deployed as a troop ship in the Crimean War and did not become involved in the Australian trade until 1856.

=== Shipwreck ===
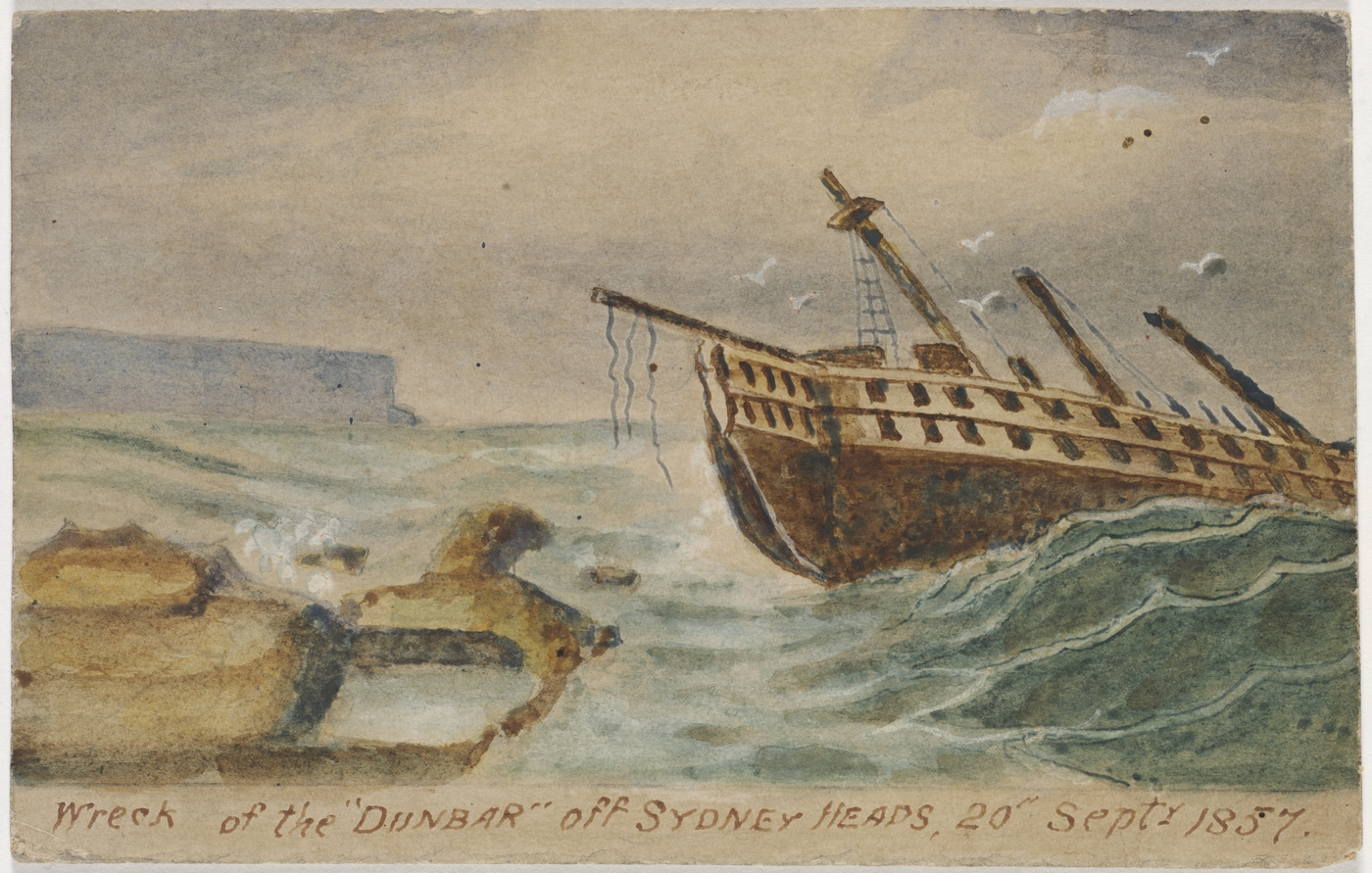
Wreck of the Dunbar off Sydney Heads

On the night of 20 August 1857, the ship approached the entrance to Port Jackson from the south, but heavy rain and a strong gale made navigating difficult. The ship's captain, James Green, either erroneously believing he had already passed the harbour's southern headland or mistaking a smaller break in the coastline known as The Gap for the port's entrance, drove the ship onto rocks. There were 59 crew and 63 passengers on board under command of Captain Green. The ship was driven against the cliffs of South Head and rapidly broke apart. The force of the gale caused the Dunbar to break up.

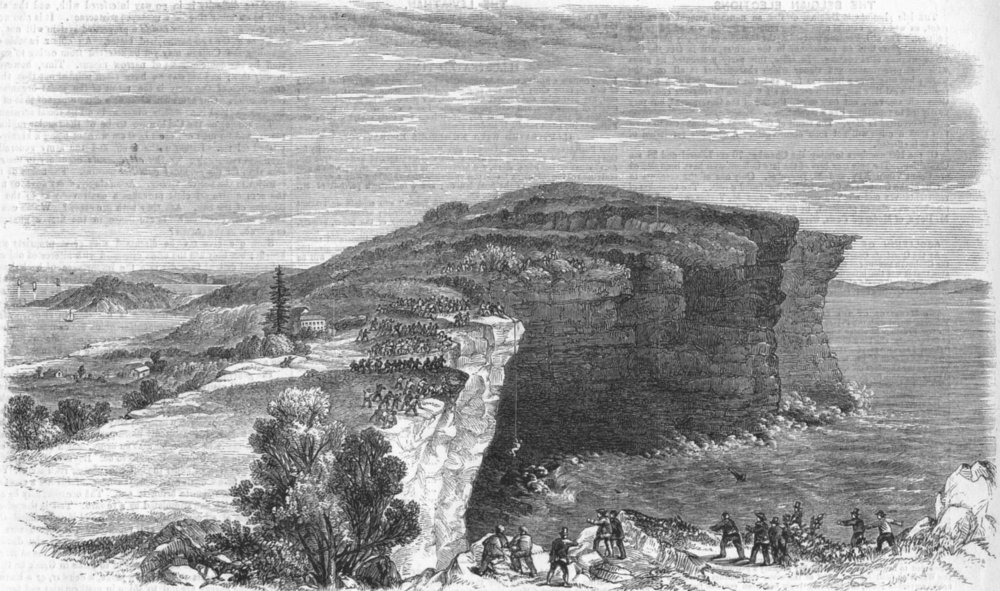
The rescue of Johnson from his perilous position, Illustrated Times

Only one out of 122 survived, Able Seaman James Johnson, who managed to cling to the cliff face until rescued a day or two later.

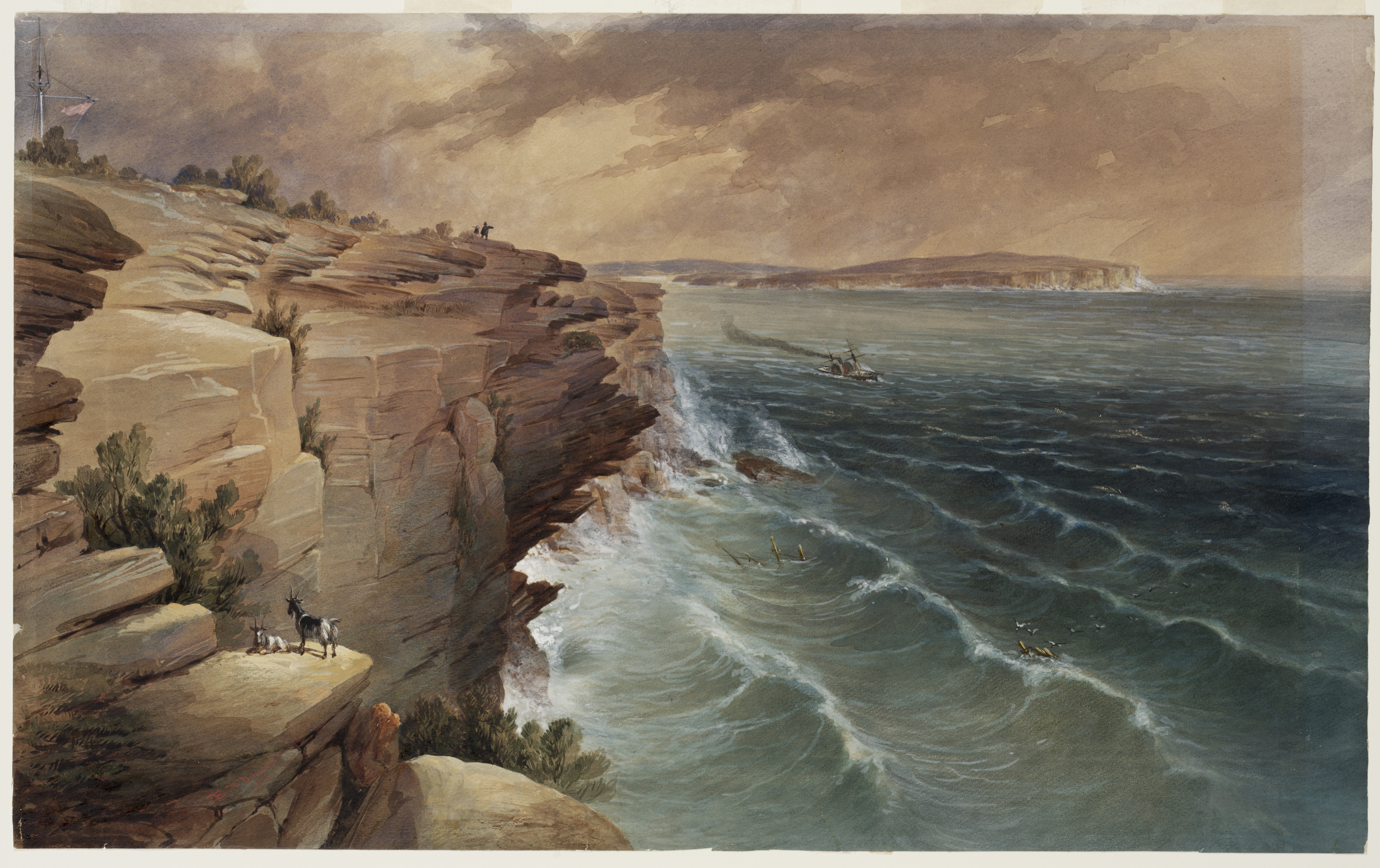
Entrance to Port Jackson, showing the wreck, a painting by Edmund Thomas

The remainder of the passengers and crew were drowned. Bodies and wreckage filled the harbour. A funeral was held in Sydney for the dead which included several prominent residents and business people. There were seven hearses, four mourning coaches and a long procession of carriages. The city closed down for the ceremony and the streets lined with mourners while all flags flew at half mast across the city and harbour. A day of public mourning was declared. The remains of the bodies of twenty-two victims were recovered and interred in a single large tomb in Camperdown Cemetery in Newtown. Several other victims have individual monuments. The ship's bell was recovered and donated to St John's Anglican Church, Darlinghurst. It was installed in the bell-tower of the adjoining St John's Primary School (now demolished) where it became a tradition for generations of head-boys to announce the start of each school day by ringing it. A later enquiry blamed the disaster on insufficient navigational aids in the harbour. As a result of this loss and that of the ship Catherine Adamson at North Head some nine weeks later, the Government built the Hornby Light at the tip of South Head. James Johnson was eventually employed in Newcastle as the lighthouse keeper and on 12 July 1866, was instrumental in rescuing the sole survivor of the paddle steamer SS Cawarra wrecked there in 1866. Memorial services for the victims of the Dunbar are held annually at St Stephen's Church.

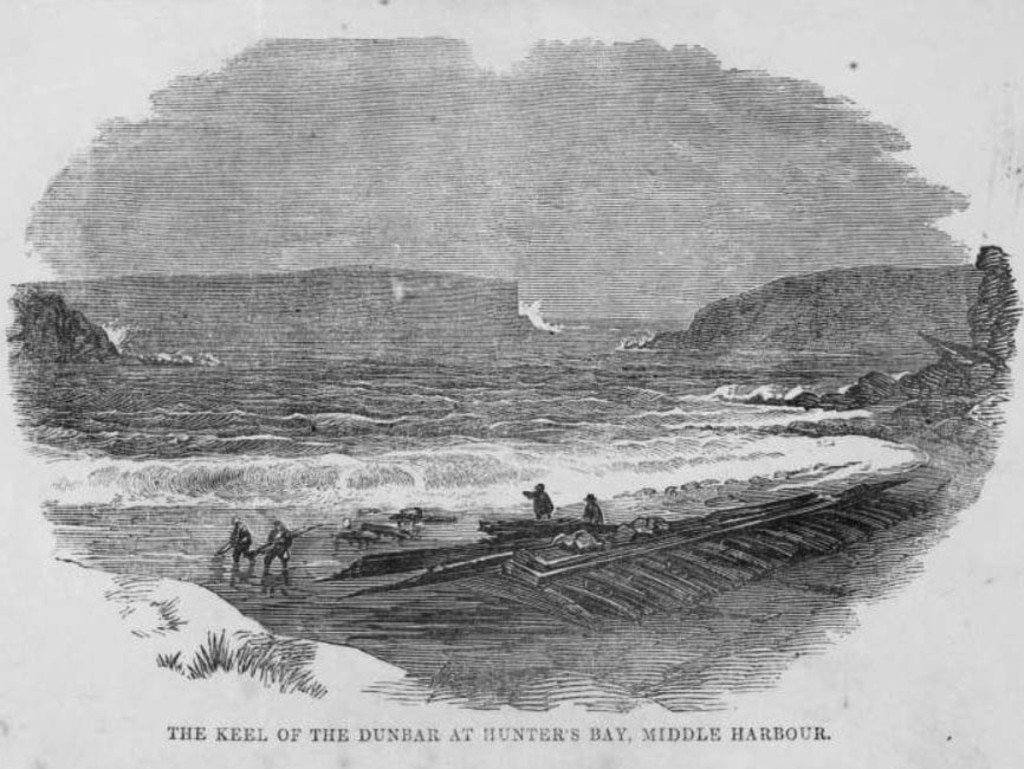
The keel of the Dunbar at Hunter's Bay, Middle Harbour

=== Site, salvage and memorials ===
The Dunbar shipwreck is located beneath the South Head cliffs near to the Signal Station. There is a rock cut inscription on the flat (horizontal) sandstone cliff top above the actual wreck site location. The inscription reads: DUNBAR C.P. 25 Aug 1857 RECUT BY E.S.S. 20 Aug 1906". It is unknown which tools were used to make the inscription, which have subsequently been picked out by dark pigment (paint?). The inscription appears to have been cut by a witness to the tragedy and later recut on an anniversary of the wreck. Its historical associations are not questioned.

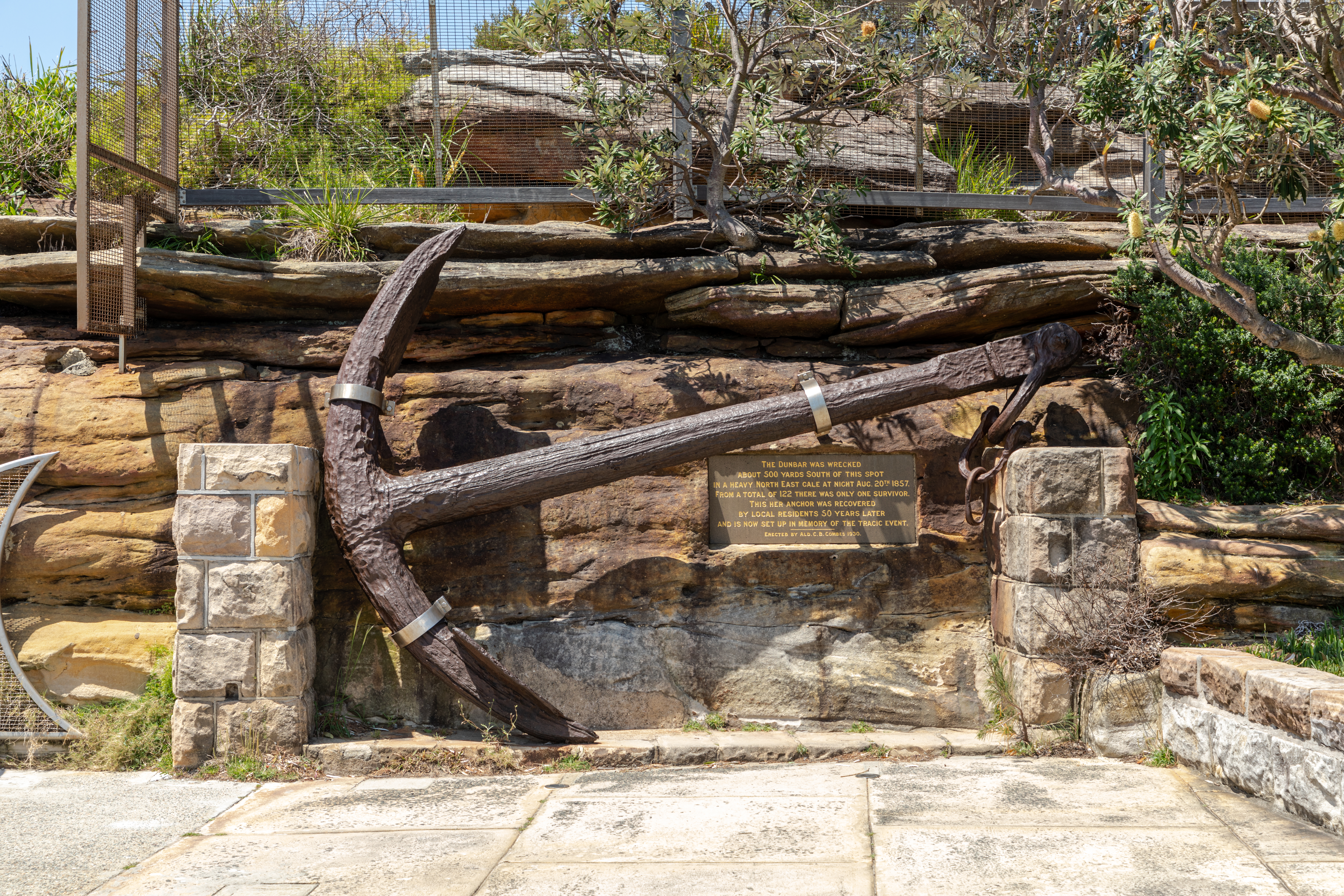
The Dunbar Anchor Memorial in 2019

The Dunbar Anchor Memorial is part of a heritage location designated as the Dunbar Group. It comprises a large (approximately 4-metre (13 ft)) iron anchor of Admiralty pattern, attached to the natural sandstone rock cliff face above the southern end of The Gap. The rock face has been worked to a vertical surface to accept the anchor which is fastened to it, with a remnant shackle attached. The memorial includes a stone plinth bonded to the wall detailing the date and purpose of the monument. A timber safety rail fence surrounds the memorial precinct.

The anchor that forms the memorial was recovered from the wreck, identified as Dunbar, in 1910. There is no reason to suggest that this was not the Dunbar wreck, being the only reported site in the immediate vicinity of the cliffs. A very similar anchor is retained on the identified Dunbar wreck site today and may be the other "bower" or main anchor used by the Ship. It was placed in its current position in 1930.

==== Condition ====
As of 15 July 2003, the shipwreck site has been greatly reduced due to the exposed nature of its setting at the foot of the South Head cliffs and its shallow depth (~7–8 metres of water). The archaeological remains have been severely reduced due to the actions of salvage divers at the site since its re-discovery in the early 1950s. Without heritage legislation in force and a lack of understanding of conservation science and heritage protection, the Dunbar and other notable wreck sites, were severely damaged at this time. Uncontrolled looting at the site lasted until the 1970s, the use of explosives known from the earlier period of this activity. Today, the main elements consist of one Admiralty and one Porters iron anchor, concreted anchor chain, pig iron ballast blocks scattered through the sandstone rock gullies, and many fragmentary remains of cargo items, ships fittings and fastenings.

The Dunbar anchor has been in outdoor exhibition since 1930 and was the focus of an intensive materials conservation seminar in 1991, held by Woollahra Council with the NSW Heritage Office. The anchor underwent conservation treatment at that time. Ongoing corrosion problems suggest that the anchor is in need of reassessment in terms of the conservation technique used. The rock inscription appears to have been hand carved and is still sharp and distinct. There appears to have been little physical weathering at the site. Due to extensive salvage by SCUBA divers in the 1950s and 1960s, the site's integrity has been severely eroded. Portions of intact archaeological deposits are retained on-site which might retain a moderate level of potential for future scientific examination.

== In contemporary culture ==
There is a description of the shipwreck of the Dunbar in Following the Equator, by Mark Twain. Twain refers to a death toll of 200 people and incorrectly refers to the ship as the Duncan Dunbar.

The incident inspired the 1887 play The Wreck of the Dunbar which was filmed as The Wreck of the Dunbar or The Yeoman's Wedding (1912).

The wreck is a key story point of the 2013 novel The Dunbar Case.

== Heritage listing ==
As at 27 October 2003, The Dunbar Group comprises:

- the shipwreck remains;
- the Gillies artefact collection owned and managed by the Australian National Maritime Museum;
- The Anchor memorial at Gap; and
- the historic rock cutting on the cliffs above the wreck site.

The Dunbar wreck site and its associated relics are a significant component of Australia's maritime heritage by virtue of the shipwreck's impact in 1857 on the developing colony of New South Wales, its influence on the improvement of navigational aids in Port Jackson (construction of Hornby Lighthouse) and its potential for interpretation through public education programs. The disaster ranks as New South Wales' worst peacetime merchant shipping tragedy. The loss of 121 passengers and crew with sole survivor James Johnson, rocked Sydney and the nation. The event is still remembered today through annual ceremonies at St Stephens Anglican Church, Camperdown (Newtown) – site of the government mass burial plot, and individual gravestones.

The Dunbar Anchor memorial and Dunbar rock inscription are a significant component of the Dunbar historic shipwreck story, and linked directly to the Historic Shipwreck remains, and to contemporary and modern community interest in the 1857 tragedy. The Dunbar anchor memorial at "The Gap" and the nearby rock inscription provide alternate public venues for community appreciation of the tragedy and impact on the inhabitants of Sydney.

Dunbar was listed on the New South Wales State Heritage Register on 17 October 2003 having satisfied the following criteria.

The place is important in demonstrating the course, or pattern, of cultural or natural history in New South Wales.

Significant in the evolution of sea safety. The loss of the fine passenger ship with that of the Catherine Adamson nine weeks later on North Head, created enormous pressure for the locating of a lighthouse closer to South Head to mark the actual harbour entrance (Hornby Light). A site representative of the dangers associated with immigrant travel during the period of the 1850s gold rushes. The events that followed the wrecking, the search, recovery and burial of victims, had a considerable impact on the rapidly expanding colony, possessing in its population a large proportion of people who had travelled by sea and were able to relate to its hardships and fears.

The place has a strong or special association with a person, or group of persons, of importance of cultural or natural history of New South Wales's history.

The Dunbar anchor memorial was established by the local government as a permanent memorial of the horrendous loss of the Dunbar (ship)ship, its passengers and crew, in 1857. The "Dunbar Disaster", as commonly referred, shocked the inhabitants of Sydney and Australia generally. The fine Ship built to high standards in Scotland by a notable shipbuilder, was destroyed in a matter of minutes by extreme storm conditions. The tragic loss of 121 lives, many women and children, had a devastating effect on the community and ranks as the worst peacetime merchant maritime tragedy to befall NSW.

The outpouring of public emotion included a phase of intensive visitation to the scene of the wreck site. Crowds made their way to the South Head cliff tops above the wreck and witnessed its final destruction and the significant loss of life and cargo. The rock inscription was cut five days after the tragedy by C.P. (identity unknown), probably by one such visitor to the site. It was re-cut 49 years to the day of the actual loss in 1906 by another unknown individual.

The place is important in demonstrating aesthetic characteristics and/or a high degree of creative or technical achievement in New South Wales.

The vessel, wrecked at the foot of the sheer cliffs below the Signal Station at South Head, has a dramatic aspect and the place a melancholy atmosphere. A rock inscription overlooking the site records the loss, and is a tangible reminder of the tragedy which occurred below. It is linked by the headland walking track to "The Gap" where one of the Dunbar's anchors is displayed. The site is accessible to the general public, retaining potential for further significant interpretative programs. The physical cliff face became known as Dunbar Head due to the impact site and is formally recognised as such today as a significant coastal landmark. The wreck event formed the focus of contemporary artists who captured the terrifying scene through notable artworks, several within the State Library of NSW collection. Artists include G. F. Gregory, Samuel Thomas Gill.

The place has a strong or special association with a particular community or cultural group in New South Wales for social, cultural or spiritual reasons.

A site significant for the impact that the loss had on the colonial population and which is retained in the social fabric of Sydney to this day. Representing the most significant shipwreck loss in NSW, the appalling nature of the disaster and the extreme loss of life and property are remembered in annual memorial services at the victim's graves located within St Stephens Cemetery, Newtown. The Dunbar Anchor Memorial acts as a public focal point for the interpretation of the tragedy. Situated prominently at "The Gap", scene of chaos at the time of the tragedy, visitors are invited to learn of the Dunbar history through interpretative plaques.

Significant local interest was generated in relocating the wreck of the Dunbar and relics from the site. Attempts are known at the time of the tragedy in 1857, in 1861, and in 1907 when two anchors were first reported underwater and a syndicate formed to recover them in 1910. One of those anchors appears to have formed the memorial established at The Gap in 1930. These events constitute concerted attempts to establish a public memorial to the tragedy and to mark, through time, the significant nature of the wreck event. 'The Gap' and the South Head coastal cliff top walk retain significance of place, as an area that witnessed the break-up of the Dunbar wreck site, slightly to the south. The anchor memorial serves to focus public appreciation of the loss for the contemporary colonial population.

The place has potential to yield information that will contribute to an understanding of the cultural or natural history of New South Wales.

The material remaining on the Dunbar site is of low significance in terms of its technical attributes. Material that has been removed from the site, eg) spectacles, telescopes, coins, cutlery, anchors, cannon, etc., is likely to be of moderate significance. One collection of artefacts recovered from the site and egistered with the Commonwealth Historic Shipwrecks Amnesty in 1993–5, The Gillies Collection, retains significance for the scale of its objects, as a record of early shipwreck salvage activities and the impact that uncontrolled access to these fragile sites can generate. The collection, now owned and managed by the Australian National Maritime Museum, is representative of the types of materials imported to Australian during the 1850s. It holds potential for research into conservation standards and applications.

The place possesses uncommon, rare or endangered aspects of the cultural or natural history of New South Wales.

The Dunbar shipwreck is significant, particularly in relation to its interpretative potential, as a rare example of a shipwreck associated with a significant loss of life in close proximity to a major port and centre of population. Recovered from the wreck site in 1910 and established as a public memorial in 1930, the resulting anchor monument is unique in New South Wales for its scale and visual setting. As an easily accessible monument to a significant shipping tragedy at the entrance to Sydney, the memorial and associated rock cutting, demonstrate the contemporary community's reaction to the impact of the Dunbar disaster to their world. The monument continues to form a component of the city's cultural fabric, as a rare example of a public venue established to keep the memory of those lost, current.

The Dunbar Admiralty-pattern anchor is characteristic of the type of large iron anchors employed by international sailing vessels during the mid nineteenth century. It comprises one of the "bower" or main anchors from the vessel, another example of which is retained on the wreck site underwater. Comparable government memorials to shipwrecks in NSW include the Walter Hood 1870 memorial near Bendalong; and the Ly-ee-Moon Cemetery (1890) at Greencape.

The place is important in demonstrating the principal characteristics of a class of cultural or natural places/environments in New South Wales.

Representative, particularly in relation to its historical attributes, of the dangers associated with immigrant travel in the mid 1850s. The Dunbar anchor memorial and the cliff-top cutting are unique items in NSW in terms of land-based memorials to historic shipwreck events. Such was the impact of the 1857 disaster that the contemporary population wished it to be retained in living memory. Comparable government memorials to shipwrecks in NSW include the Walter Hood 1870 memorial near Bendalong; and the Ly-ee-Moon Cemetery (1890) at Greencape.

== See also ==
- List of disasters in Australia by death toll
- The Wreck of the Dunbar or The Yeoman's Wedding
