= Dolly's Scoop =

1916 film

- Directed by: Joe De Grasse
- Written by: Ida May Park (screenplay); Hugh C. Weir (story)
- Produced by: Rex Film Co.
- Starring: Lon Chaney; Louise Lovely
- Distributed by: Universal Pictures
- Release date: February 20, 1916
- Running time: 2 reels (20 minutes)
- Country: United States
- Language: Silent with English intertitles

Dolly's Scoop is a 1916 American silent drama film directed by Joe De Grasse and featuring Lon Chaney. It was written by Ida May Park, based on a story by Hugh Weir. This was one of the few silent films that subtitled the actors' dialogue at the bottom of the screen, instead of using title cards. Also, this was one of the only Lon Chaney films in which Chaney wound up getting the girl at the end of the picture. A still exists showing Lon Chaney in the role of the reporter, Dan Fisher.

A print of the film survives at the British Film and Television Institute in London. It is missing the main title but is otherwise essentially complete.

== Plot ==
James Fairfax is the editor of the Morning Argus, a scandal sheet that will publish any juicy story, no matter who it hurts. His employees resent his underhanded methods, especially Dolly Clare, one of his reporters. Editor Fairfax is very jealous of his wife Alice's former relations with a man named Philip Ainsworth. Philip's sister comes to see Alice and pleads with her to use her influence to get her brother Philip to give up drinking. Alice goes to see him one afternoon and finds him drunk, holding her old love letters that she had written him before she married James Fairfax. He tries to embrace her drunkenly, but she dodges him; when he falls to the floor unconscious, she picks up her letters and leaves.

Dolly arrives in time to see a veiled woman leaving the building. In Philip's room, she finds a photo of Alice Fairfax and, not knowing who she is, she calls Mr. Fairfax with the juicy story. Alice learns that Dolly's on her way to her husband's office with the photo of her, and she rushes there to intercept her. There she pleads with Dolly to destroy the picture, so Dolly tries in vain to stop Mr. Fairfax from publishing the photo, even though he still has not seen it yet. Just then a reporter named Dan Fisher (Lon Chaney) wanders in with a photo of a suicide victim, and Dolly decides to switch the two photos. Alice confesses everything to her husband and, convinced she's telling the truth, he orders the story squelched. The papers are coming off the press and Fairfax discovers how Dolly substituted the photo. He changes the policy of the paper to cover only genuine news stories from then on. Dolly and Dan, who had been attracted to each other for some time, decide to start a relationship.

== Cast ==
- Louise Lovely – Dolly Clare (as Louise Welch)
- Lon Chaney – reporter Dan Fisher
- Marjorie Ellison – Alice Fairfax
- Hayward Mack – James Fairfax
- Mae Gaston – Helen
- Laura Praether – Maid
- Millard K. Wilson – Philip Ainsworth
- Edward Nes – Jap Boy (sic)
- Charles Emmett Mack – Office boy (uncredited)
- Antrim Short – Office boy

== Reception ==
"To the general public, newspaper stories always have a certain fascination and so Dolly's Scoop, a melodramatic number of that sort, will doubtless appeal despite the fact that judged from a reportorial standpoint, it is unreal." — Motion Picture News

"The cast is a large one and this makes the opening scenes a little confusing. Later a very pleasing story develops in which the editor in his quest for sensational news almost involves his own wife in a scandal. The photography is good and the production as a whole a pleasing one, even though the story is not at all times convincing." — The Moving Picture World
