= Royal Commission on the Moving Picture Industry in Australia =

The Royal Commission on the Moving Picture Industry in Australia was held from 1926 to 1928. It explored a series of issues to do with the Australian film industry, with evidence given by a number of leading figures at the time, including Franklyn Barrett, Gayne Dexter, Paulette McDonagh, Stuart F. Doyle, William Gibson, Raymond Longford and Louise Lovely. It made a number of recommendations, but its ultimate impact was limited.

== Additional resources ==
- Royal Commission on the Moving Picture Industry In Australia Research Papers - Academia.edu
- Australian (Inter)national Cinema: The Royal Commission on the Moving Picture Industry in Australia, 1926–1928., Australasian Films Ltd. and the American monopoly
- Royal Commission into the Moving Picture Industry (Media Classification)
