= One Hundred Years Ago =

- SMH 13 May 1911
- Directed by: Gaston Mervale
- Written by: P. W. Marony
- Starring: Louise Carbasse
- Production company: Australian Life Biograph Company
- Release date: 8 May 1911
- Running time: 2,000 feet
- Country: Australia
- Languages: Silent film English intertitles

One Hundred Years Ago is a 1911 Australian silent film directed by Gaston Mervale. It features an early screen performance from Louise Lovely (billed as "Louise Carbasse") and is considered a lost film.

== Plot ==
The movie was billed as "an Anglo-Australian romantic drama". Jasper Hugh Lovel is sent to prison at Norfolk Island for a crime he did not commit. A woman in England who loves him manages to secure his pardon and they are reunited.

There was a duel sequence.

== Cast ==
- Louise Carbasse as Judith (in love with Lovel)
- Harrie Ireland as Katharine (a burglar's wife)
- A.J. Patrick as Lovel (a young squire)
- Godfrey Cass as Captain Ridd (his rival)
- Alf Scarlett as an Old Jew (a receiver of stolen goods)
- James Martin as a magistrate
- Harry Beaumont as a Burglar

== Production ==
The film was shot at Australian Life Biograph's factory in Manly, New South Wales.

Unlike many Australian films of the time, it was an original script, not based on a play. The author was Patrick William Marony.

The story is founded on fact. In an old cell at Norfolk Island may be seen the following inscription: "I, Jasper Hugh Lovel, here proclaim, before God and man, I am innocent. May God avenge me on mine enemy."

== Reception ==
The Launceston Daily Telegraph called it:

One of those costume playlets, which require a deal of patience, knowledge of the period, and considerable skill to produce. In Mr. Mervalc all these, factors are embraced, and his work is stamped on every foot of the thousands offeet of film... Attention to tho dressing, atmosphere of the early period, and mise en scene, has been minute, iuid the results presented with clarity.
