= Conn, the Shaughraun =

- Directed by: Gaston Mervale
- Based on: play by Dion Boucicault
- Starring: Louise Carbasse
- Production company: Australian Life Biograph Company
- Release date: 28 March 1912 (Sydney)
- Running time: 3,000 feet
- Country: Australia
- Languages: Silent film English intertitles

Conn, the Shaughraun is a 1912 Australian silent film directed by Gaston Mervale starring Louise Lovely based on a popular play by Dion Boucicault. It is considered a lost film.

== Plot ==
Kinchela, an unscrupulous land agent, determines to get possession of the land belonging to Robert Ffolliott and his sister Claire, who are his charges. He causes Robert to be sentenced to penal servitude by swearing information falsely that he is a Fenian. Robert escapes and returns home, and is again soon in the hands of Kinchela. But Conn, the shaughraun, intervenes, Robert is pardoned (as are all the Fenians), and Kinchela brought to justice.
