= Tangled Hearts =

1916 film

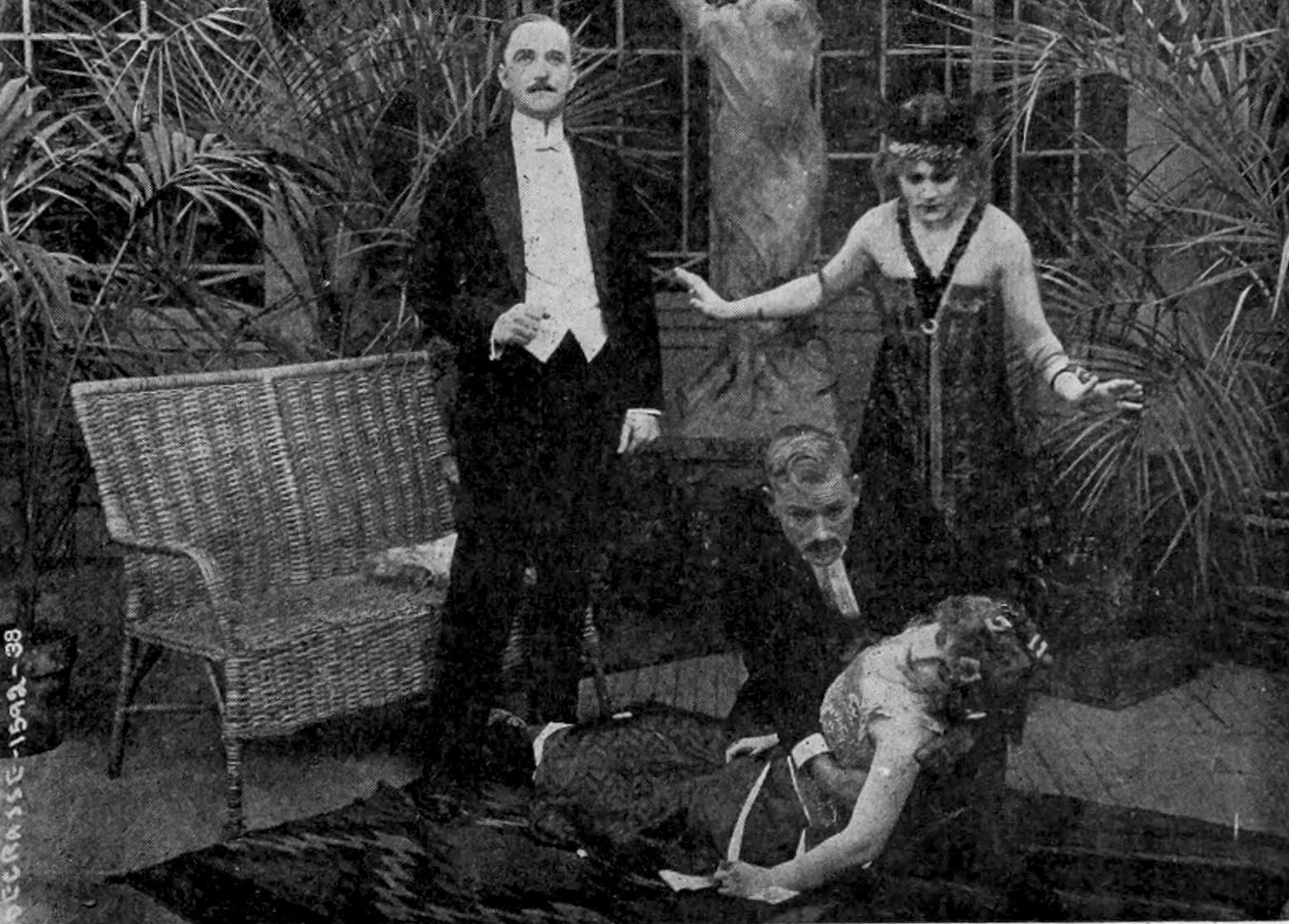
- Scene from the film
- Directed by: Joe De Grasse
- Written by: Ida May Park (screenplay)
- Produced by: Bluebird Film Co.
- Starring: Lon Chaney; Louise Lovely
- Music by: M. Winkler
- Distributed by: Universal Pictures
- Release date: April 2, 1916
- Running time: 5 reels (50 minutes)
- Country: United States
- Language: Silent with English intertitles

Tangled Hearts is a 1916 silent drama film directed by Joe De Grasse, written by Ida May Park, and starring Lon Chaney and Louise Lovely. A small fragment (around 2 minutes) of the film survives in a private collection. A still exists showing Chaney in the role of John Hammond, menacing his wife Enid with a pistol.

== Plot ==
Montgomery Seaton is a rich social parasite who badly neglects his wife Lucille. Enid Hammond is married to John Hammond, but she is also Montgomery Seaton's sweetheart. Enid tells Seaton that many years ago, she ran away with a man named John Dalton, only to discover that he was married. She left Dalton and returned home, later marrying John Hammond but not realizing at the time that she was pregnant with Dalton's child. Fortunately, Enid was able to wait until her husband was away on a business trip before giving birth. Not wanting her husband to know she had an illegitimate child, Enid gave the baby to a nurse who raised the little girl. But now she has discovered that the nurse has died, and Enid needs to find a home for the girl.

Seaton lies for Enid, telling John Hammond that he had an illegitimate child years ago and that he is trying to find a home for the child. Enid convinces her husband that they should adopt the child. Now having custody of what is actually her own child, Enid writes Seaton to tell him that the child arrived safely, but John Hammond accidentally gets the note and assumes Seaton is the father and Enid is the mother of the little girl, driving him to a rage.

That night at a reception, John Hammond sees his wife and Mr. Seaton engaged in a secretive conversation and he draws a pistol in anger. Enid throws herself in front of Seaton and is shot. Lucille had earlier seen her husband bringing the child to Enid's house and suspects an affair of some sort is going on. The rich widow Vera Lane is friends with all of these people and, understanding the whole story that has transpired, takes it upon herself to straighten out all of the entanglements. Enid tells her forgiving husband the truth, and Montgomery Seaton is reunited with his wife Lucille.

== Cast ==
- Louise Lovely as Vera Lane
- Hayward Mack as Montgomery Seaton
- Lon Chaney as John Hammond
- Marjorie Ellison as Enid Hammond (John Hammond's wife)
- Georgia French as the illegitimate child
- Agnes Vernon as Lucille Seaton (Montgomery's neglected wife)
- Colin Chase as John Dalton (credited as Bud Chase)
- Jay Belasco as Ernest Courtney

== Reception ==
"This is an offering which will interest and hold quite well because the story has some truly tangled situations. As it stands, it will get over, but it falls considerably short of being big." --- Wid's Film Daily

"Stronger pictures with more interesting, if not more intricate, plots have appeared on this program, but to compensate for any weaknesses in the story there is this most engaging triple alliance. While the three actresses dominate the production, the performances of Lon Chaney and Hayward Mack are not wanting in force." ---Moving Picture World

"If the author had not been carried away with the dramatic possibilities of the theme, Tangled Hearts would have worked itself into a very good comedy. The possibilities in this direction were entirely overlooked." --- Variety
