= The Stubbornness of Geraldine =

- Directed by: Gaston Mervale
- Based on: a play by Clyde Fitch
- Release date: 1915
- Country: United States
- Languages: Silent film English intertitles

The Stubbornness of Geraldine is a 1915 American silent film directed by Gaston Mervale adapted from a play by Clyde Fitch.
