= Louise Lovely =

Australian actress (1895–1980)

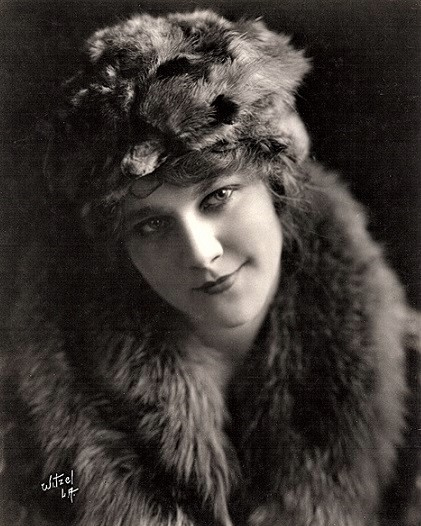
- Lovely, c. 1920
- Born: Nellie Louise Carbasse; 28 February 1895; Paddington, New South Wales, Australia
- Died: 18 March 1980 (aged 85); Taroona, Tasmania, Australia
- Other names: Louise Carbasse; Louise Welch
- Years active: 1904–1925
- Spouses: Wilton Welch (m. 1912; div. 1928) Bert Cowan (m. 1930)

Louise Lovely (born Nellie Louise Carbasse; 28 February 1895 – 18 March 1980) was an Australian film actress of Swiss-Italian descent. She is credited by film historians as being the first Australian actress to have a successful career in Hollywood, signing a contract with Universal Pictures in the United States in 1914. Lovely appeared in 50 American films and ten Australian films before retiring from acting in 1925.

== Early life ==
Louise Lovely was born Nellie Louise Carbasse in Paddington, Sydney to an Italian musician and composer father, Ferruccio Carlo Alberti, and a Swiss mother, Elise Louise Jeanne de Grüningen Lehmann, who had come to Australia in 1891, in the company of Sarah Bernhardt, and had decided to remain in Sydney once Bernhardt had left Australia.

Louise Lovely made her professional debut at age nine as Eva in a stage production of the classic Uncle Tom's Cabin, using the name Louise Carbasse.

== Career ==
=== Early work ===
Lovely was acting with George Marlow's theatre company in Western Australia when she received a telegram from Gaston Mervale to appear in a series of movies for Australian Life Biograph Company.

=== Hollywood films ===
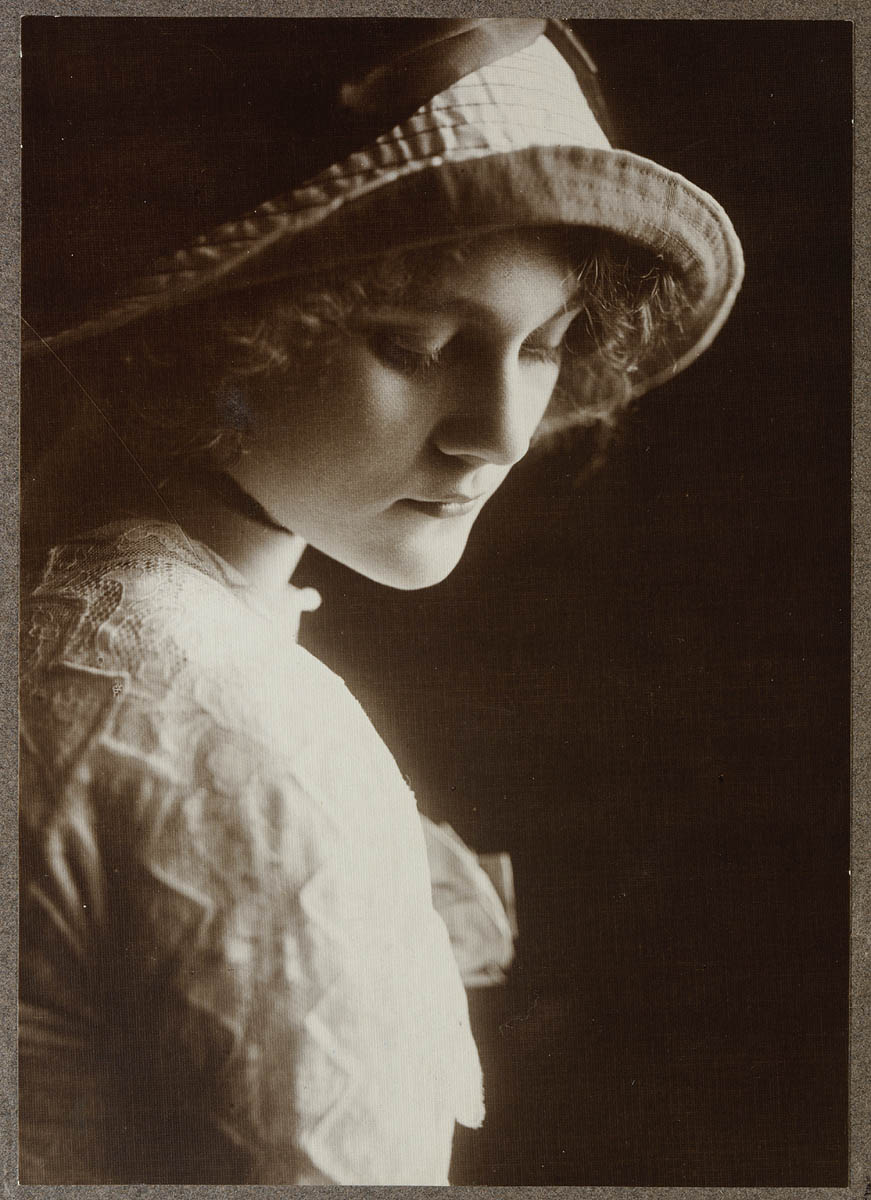
Louise Carbasse (Louise Lovely), Australia, ca. 1913

In 1914, Lovely moved to the United States with her husband, hoping to replicate her Australian success, settling in Los Angeles, California. In California, Lovely caught the attention of Universal Studios head Carl Laemmle who both gave her a contract with his studio and re-christened her Louise Lovely. She made her American debut alongside the legendary Lon Chaney in Father and the Boys in 1915, receiving strong reviews. She starred with Chaney again in several other films including her next release US film Stronger Than Death (1915) and The Gilded Spider and Tangled Hearts (both 1916).

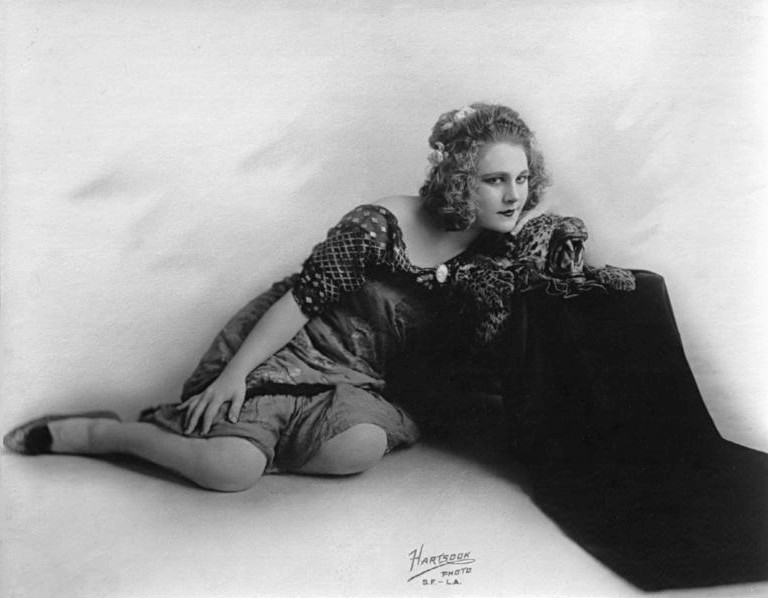
Lovely, c. 1920.

Lovely became one of Universal's major early stars and a challenger to Mary Pickford's status as the golden girl of early silent cinema, but was dropped by the studio in 1918 following a contract dispute. Though she was subsequently picked up by 20th Century Fox, where she starred in a series of Westerns with William Farnum, her career never reached its earlier heights. Over a course of four years, she had appeared in fifty American films.

As a consequence of having her hair singed on an American movie set, she permanently changed her hair style from long flowing locks to a bob cut.

=== Return to Australia ===
In 1924, Lovely and her husband returned to Australia in pursuit of a new interest - film production. Lovely had maintained a long-time interest in the behind-the-scenes aspects of film, and had collaborated with Welch on a successful short documentary feature, A Day at the Studio, but her plans for her return to Australia were far more ambitious. Lovely and Welch undertook a nationwide talent search to encourage budding new movie actresses. Over 23,000 actors and actresses attended Lovely's auditions, which included demonstrations of movie equipment and acting technique, and which took place at prestigious locations such as Melbourne's Princess Theatre. Twenty were selected to appear in Lovely's next film venture Jewelled Nights (1925), which was written and directed by herself and her husband.

Based on the novel by Marie Bjelke Petersen, Jewelled Nights told the story of a young woman who escaped from an unhappy marriage, instead posing as a young man and finding refuge in a tough mining community, where she finds love with a fellow miner (played by Gordon Collingridge). Though it was an outstanding success, it did not recoup its high costs. The Australian film industry, once one of the most productive in the world, was about to fall into a slump that was to last for fifty years. Lovely was offered no more roles and could not afford any further independent productions, and thus, Jewelled Nights was her last film. Today, very little of the film survives other than outtakes and stills.

Prior to the production of Jewelled Nights, between 1921 and 1925, Lovely and Welch traveled throughout the United States and Australia, leading "A Day at the Studio", a traveling show in which audience members volunteered for on-stage "screen tests".

== Personal life ==
Lovely married fellow actor Wilton Welch in February 1912, when she was sixteen years old, and relocated to the United States with him. Lovely testified at the Royal Commission on the Moving Picture Industry in Australia, suggesting a number of measures that might stimulate the struggling local film industry. Soon afterwards, she made a return to the stage. It was at around this time that Lovely's marriage to Wilton Welch disintegrated; Welch was homosexual, and from their return to Australia in 1924 they no longer lived together. Lovely and Welch were divorced in November 1928.

She married Melbourne theatre manager Andrew Bertie Cowen, (Note: Report of a 1924 traffic prosecution has "Andrew Bertie Cowen" and the Victorian marriage record (registration no.11739 of 1928) has "Nellie Louise Alberti" and "Andrew Bertie Cowen".) known as "Bert Cowan", at the Melbourne Registry Office on Monday, 26 November 1928; the same day as her divorce was granted in Sydney. Her marriage to Cowan lasted for the rest of her life. Cowan had a background of drama, revue and pantomime before becoming involved with the picture theatre business. He was in turn manager of Hoyts' Regent, Plaza and Lyceum theatres in Melbourne before in 1934 taking on the Metro Theatre in Collins Street for MGM.

The couple moved to Hobart, Tasmania in 1946, where Cowan became the manager of the Prince of Wales Theatre. Lovely managed the theatre's sweet shop, where she worked until her death in 1980.

== Filmography ==
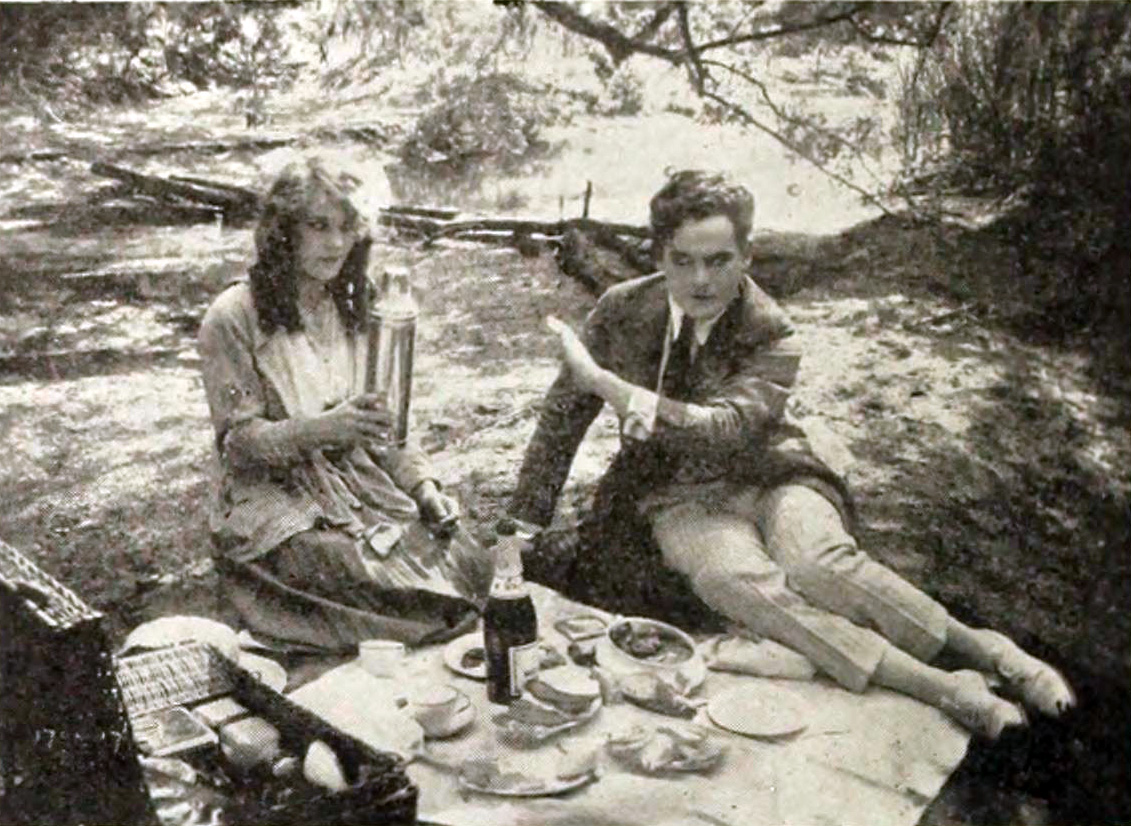
Bobbie of the Ballet (1916).

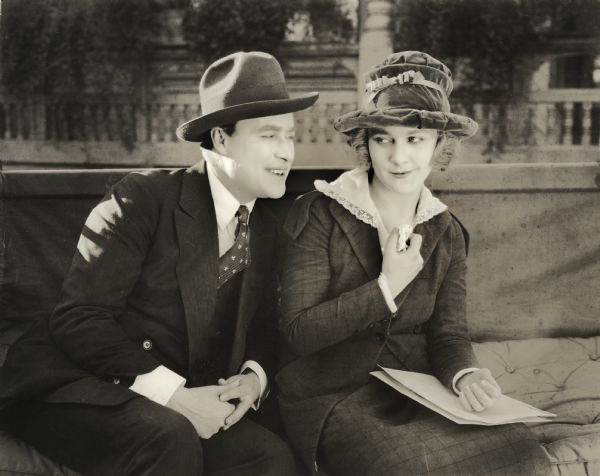
With Hale Hamilton in Johnny on the Spot (1919).

Key
†	Denotes a lost or presumed lost film. (Note: Status of films deemed lost is adapted from Lovely's entry in the Women Film Pioneers Project at Columbia University. According to the project, only nine films of Lovely are extant, five of which are feature films.)

Year	Title	Role	Notes
1911	One Hundred Years Ago †	Judith	As Louise Carbasse
1911	A Ticket in Tatts †	Mrs. Fallon	As Louise Carbasse
1911	The Colleen Bawn †	The Colleen	As Louise Carbasse
1911	A Tale of the Australian Bush †	Mrs. Hall	As Louise Carbasse
1912	Hands Across the Sea †		As Louise Carbasse
1912	A Daughter of Australia †		As Louise Carbasse
1912	Conn, the Shaughraun †		As Louise Carbasse
1912	The Wreck of the Dunbar or The Yeoman's Wedding †		Short film; as Louise Carbasse
1912	The Ticket of Leave Man †		As Louise Carbasse
1915	Father and the Boys †	Bessie Brayton	
1915	Stronger Than Death †	June Lathrop	
1916	The Measure of a Man †	Pattie Batch	
1916	Dolly's Scoop	Dolly Clare	Short film; as Louise Welch
1916	The Grip of Jealousy †	Virginia Grant	
1916	Tangled Hearts †	Vera Lane	
1916	The Gilded Spider	Leonita & Elisa	
1916	The Grasp of Greed	Alice Gordon	
1916	Bobbie of the Ballet †	Bobbie Brent	
1916	Bettina Loved a Soldier †	Bettina Scott	
1916	The Social Buccaneer	Marjorie Woods	
1916	Stronger Than Steel †	Daphne of the Follies	Short film
1917	Blood Money †	Belle Blaire	Short film
1917	The Fugitive †	Nan Donovan	Short film
1917	The Diamonds of Destiny †	Jane Lowe	Short film
1917	The Outlaw and the Lady †	Ruth Carter	Short film
1917	The Fourth Witness †	Margaret Bryant	Short film
1917	The Gift Girl	Rokaia	Feature film
1917	The Grip of Love †	Ruth Overholt	Short film
1917	Her Great Dilemma †	Mary Blanton	Short film
1917	The Field of Honor	Laura Sheldon	
1917	Her Strange Experience †	Marie	Short film
1917	The Reed Case †	Helen Reed	
1917	Sirens of the Sea †	Lorelei	
1918	The Wolf and His Mate †	Bess Nolan	
1918	Painted Lips †	Lou McTavish	
1918	Nobody's Wife †	Hope Ross	
1918	The Girl Who Wouldn't Quit †	Joan Tracy	
1918	A Rich Man's Darling †	Julie Le Fabrier	
1919	Life's a Funny Proposition †	Mary Austin	
1919	Johnny-on-the-Spot †	Ann Travers	
1919	The Man Hunter †	Helen Garfield	
1919	The Usurper †	Beatrice Clive	
1919	The Lone Star Ranger †	Ray Longstreth	
1919	Wolves of the Night †	Isabel Hollins	
1919	The Last of the Duanes †	Jenny Lee	
1919	Wings of the Morning †	Iris Deane	
1920	The Third Woman	Eleanor Steele	
1920	The Butterfly Man †	Bessie Morgan	
1920	The Orphan †	Helen Fields	
1920	Twins of Suffering Creek †	Little Casino	
1920	The Joyous Trouble-Makers †	Beatrice Corlin	
1920	The Skywayman †	Grace Ames	
1920	The Little Grey Mouse †	Beverly Arnold	
1921	Partners of Fate †	Helen Meriless	
1921	While the Devil Laughs †	Mary Franklin	
1921	The Old Nest	Kate at 21–31	
1921	The Heart of the North	Patricia Graham	
1921	The Poverty of Riches †	Grace Donaldson	
1921	Life's Greatest Question †	Nan Cumberland	
1922	Shattered Idols †	Diana Chichester	
1925	Jewelled Nights †	Elaine Fleetwood	

== Sources ==
- Blonski, Annette; Creed, Barbara; Freiberg, Freda (1987). Don't Shoot Darling!: Women's Independent Filmmaking in Australia. Spinifex Press. ISBN 978-0-864-36058-8.
- Delamoir, Marie Jeanette (January 1998). "Styling a star: 'Call her Louise Lovely'". Journal of Australian Studies. 22 (58): 48–55. doi:10.1080/14443059809387401.
- Delamoir, Marie Jeanette (2002). "Louise Lovely: The Construction of a Star". Ph.D. In Media Studies Dissertation. Melbourne, Victoria, Australia: La Trobe University.
- Delamoir, Marie Jeanette (2004). "Louise Lovely, Bluebird Photoplays, and the Star System". The Moving Image. 4 (2): 64–85. doi:10.1353/mov.2004.0025. JSTOR 41167168. S2CID 194017782.
- Delamoir, Marie Jeannette; Gaunson, Stephen (2 September 2015). "Introduction to re-evaluating the Royal Commission into the Australian Moving Picture Industry, 1927–1928". Studies in Australasian Cinema. 9 (3): 225–229. doi:10.1080/17503175.2015.1087111.
- Vieth, Errol; Moran, Albert (2005). Historical Dictionary of Australian and New Zealand Cinema. Scarecrow Press. ISBN 978-0-810-86527-3.
