= Australian Life Biograph Company =

Australian film production company

The Australian Life Biograph Company was a short lived Australian film production company in the silent era. It funded many of the early films of Gaston Mervale and Louise Lovely.

The company was formed in 1911 with capital of £6,000 and was based in Sydney. It produced eight feature films in total, all directed by Mervale, who used a stock company of actors including Lovely (then known as Louise Carbasse), Jerome Partick, Godfrey Cass and Harry Beaumont. Movies were shot at Biograph's glass-roofed studio in Manly, New South Wales.

In the words of film historians Graham Shirley and Brian Adams "the subjects chosen were predominantly colonial, with no less than six featuring prison themes, usually with an innocent man receiving a pardon or making his escape." Most of them also had a strongly Australian flavour.

At one stage the company was earning over £300 a week and employing six lecturers to accompany the films. However they had trouble finding a market for their work and the company later wound up and merged into Universal Films Ltd in 1912.

== Filmography ==
- One Hundred Years Ago (1911)
- A Ticket in Tatts (1911)
- The Colleen Bawn (1911)
- A Tale of the Australian Bush (1911)
- Hands Across the Sea (1912)
- A Daughter of Australia (1912)
- Conn, the Shaughraun (1912)
- The Ticket of Leave Man (1912)
