= A Ticket in Tatts (1911 film) =

- Directed by: Gaston Mervale
- Written by: P. W. Marony
- Starring: Godfrey Cass
- Production company: Australian Life Biograph Company
- Release date: 19 June 1911
- Running time: 2,000 feet
- Country: Australia
- Languages: Silent film English intertitles

A Ticket in Tatts is a 1911 Australian silent film directed by Gaston Mervale.

It is not to be confused with the 1934 Australian film of the same name.

== Plot ==
John Hare loses his job after going to the races at work without permission. Despite being married with a child he invests his last shilling in a Tattersall's sweep ticket and draws the favourite. He interviews Dick Fallows, the owner of the favourite, and puts two-thirds of the sweep money with him. The horse wins and after Hare secures the prize money he goes to the Fallows house to celebrate, where he meets Mrs Fallows, Fred Wynne and some others. Hare plays cards and gets drunk, falling asleep on the couch in the room. A quarrel results between Fallows and Wynne; Fallows winds up killing Wynne with a knife, and then puts the knife in Hare's hand.

Hare wakes up, sees the knife and Wynne's corpse and thinks he might have done the murder. Fallows confirms this was the case and suggest he tell his wife and leave town. Hare does this. Mrs Fallows starts to follow her husband around town and discovers him with another woman. Fallows knocks her down and is about to kill when stopped by the occupants by a passing tram.

Hare is tormented by dreams of his wife and child and decides to give himself up so he can see them again. He is arrested by the injured Mrs Fallows, believing herself near death, confesses that Hare was innocent and her husband murdered Wynne. Fallows is arrested while Hare is released, gets his old job back and returns to his family.

== Cast ==
- A.J. Patrick as John Hare
- Alf Scarlett as Dick Fallows
- Godfrey Cass as Fred Wynne
- James Martin as clergyman
- Louise Carbasse as Mrs Fallows
- Harrie Ireland as Mrs Hare
- Harry Beaumont

== Production ==
The film was announced in May 1911. According to The Bulletin "It was filmed by the local concern presided over by Gaston Mervale at the studio at Queenscliffe, Manly; and the actors included well-known mummers like Harrie Ireland and Louise Carbasse."

== Reception ==
The Bulletin reported the film "was horsey; and murder, greed and treachery combined to point a moral and adorn an exciting tale."

The Launceston Examiner called it "a decided improvement on its predecessor in this field, a fine plot being illustrated in a clear and concise manner. Miss Harrie Ireland as Louise Carbasse, and the principals in '100 Years Ago,' were seen to advantage, whilst photographically the film is of great clarity and splendidly staged. The only possible exception that might be mentioned in a generally favourable review is that the finale is, contrary to the usual procedure of Australian producers. somewhat hurried. However, brevity is better than a drawn-out finale, and the applause which signalised the happy denounement demonstrated that it was much to the liking of those present."

The film appears to have been well received by the public and critics. When it screened in Adelaide in a rented hall owned by the YMCA, the YMCA ordered removal of a poster advertising it on the grounds that it could be seen to promote gambling.
