= Olivier Pain (journalist) =

French journalist (1845–1884)

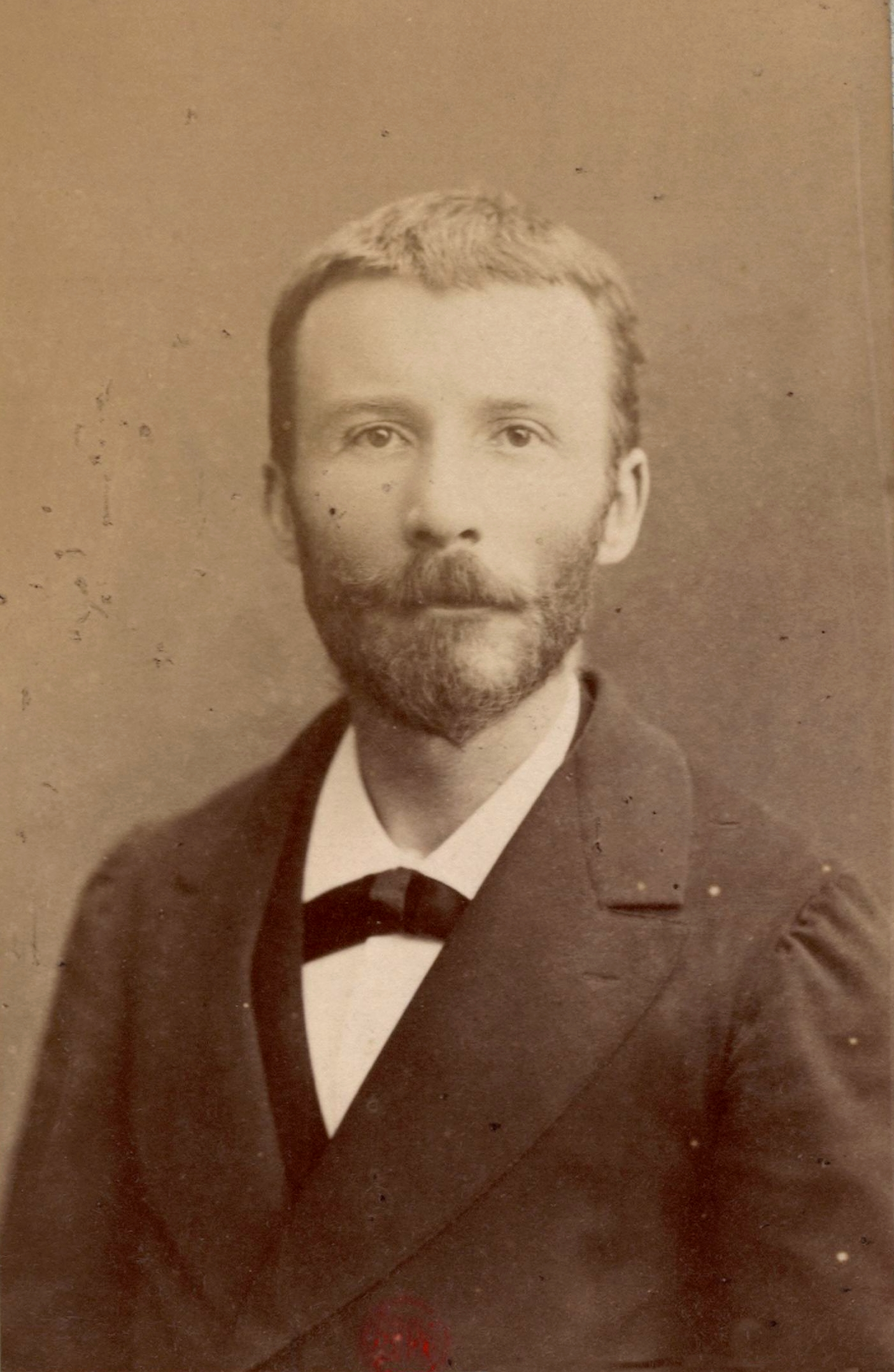
- Pain photographed by Nadar.
- Born: April 1845; Troyes, France
- Died: 15 November 1884 (aged 39); Sudan

Olivier Pain (April 1845 – 15 November 1884) was a French journalist and Communard notable for his escape from New Caledonia alongside Henri Rochefort, and for travelling to the Sudan during the Mahdist War. He also wrote under the pseudonym Olivier Tolcès.

Pain was born in Troyes in April 1845 to a banker, but was raised in Normandy, where he studied law. At the same time, he attended radical student circles, and began to write for newspapers such as La Marseillaise and Henri Rochefort's La Lanterne, earning himself his first conviction. During his sentence, he was imprisoned in Sainte-Pélagie Prison alongside Rochefort, who he befriended.

He took part in the Paris Commune of 1871, becoming Paschal Grousset's "Chief of Staff for External Relations". He was noted for his highly radical positions, even among the Communards, invoking "eye for an eye" against government officials. During the Bloody Week, the military assault which ended the Commune, he was wounded at a water tower barricade, but managed to escape before being arrested in Rouen on 27 July 1871.

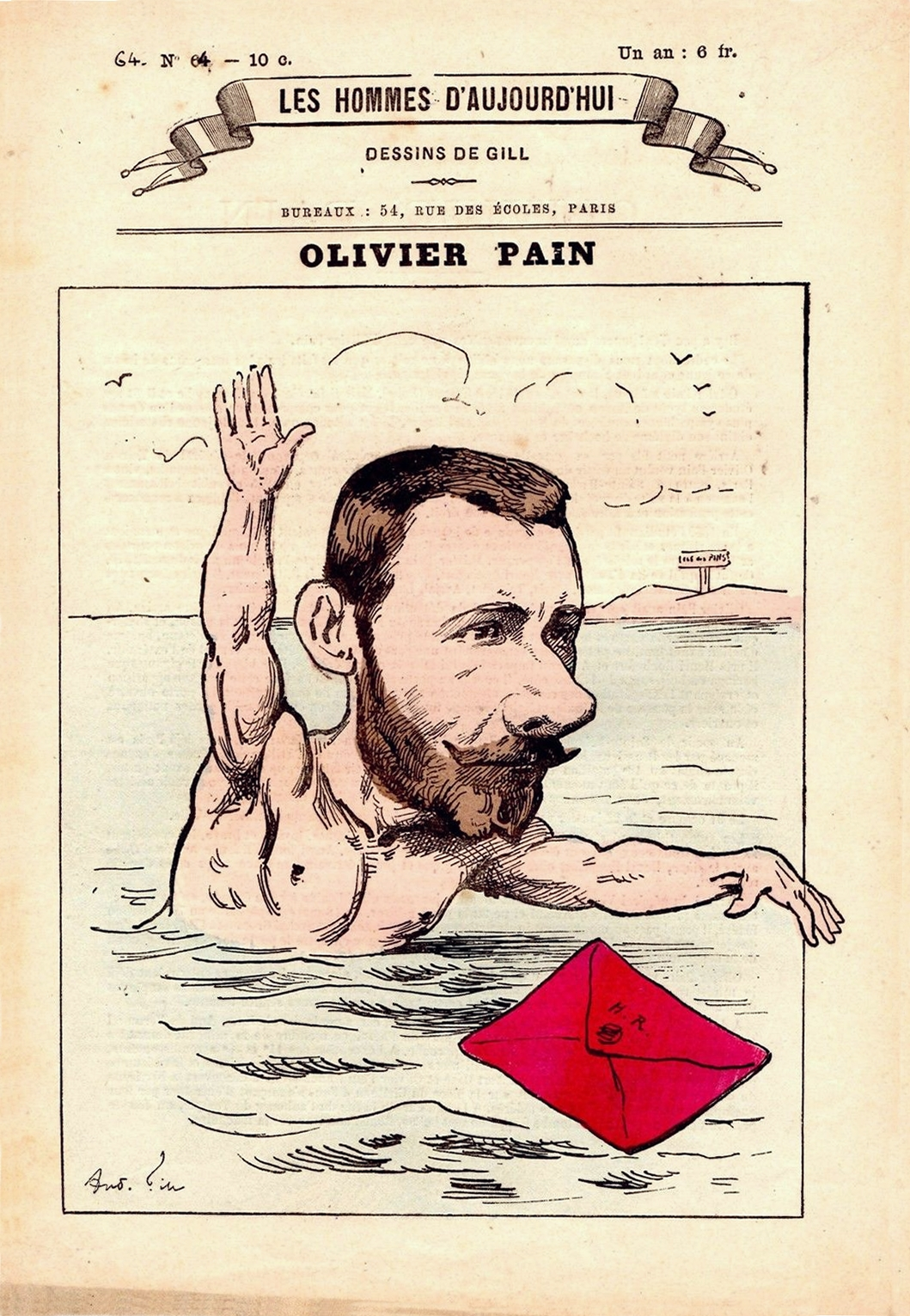
An 1879 caricature of Pain from Hommes d'aujourd'hui.

Pain was sentenced to deportation to New Caledonia, where he was soon joined by Rochefort, Grousset, and François Jourde. Eventually, in 1874, these three prisoners, alongside two others, managed to escape New Caledonia by swimming to a whaling boat which allowed them to board, then fleeing to Australia and splitting up: Pain and Rochefort travelled to the United States and then London, arriving on 18 June 1874. Their escape was the only successful one in the history of New Caledonia as a French penal colony, and made headlines in France, as well as being the subject of a Manet painting.

Pain quickly got back into contact with the French Press, and in 1877 he was dispatched to report on the Russo-Turkish War for La Lanterne. Bluffing his way into Plevna without a firman from the Ottoman Sultan giving him permission to be there, Pain managed to befriend Osman Nuri Pasha, and was present in the city throughout the siege and at its capture by the Russians, as a consequence spending the rest of the war imprisoned. In 1880, he was finally able to return to France due to a general amnesty for communards.

In early 1884, Pain was given a commission from Le Figaro to travel to the Sudan and report on the Mahdist Revolt. With letters of introduction and travel help from Jamāl al-Dīn al-Afghānī, Pain was the only one of a party of other radicals including James O'Kelly to make it to the Sudan (the others being arrested), arriving at El Obeid on 15 August 1884. There, he pledged his loyalty to the Mahdi, supposedly in the name of France. The Sudanese, however, distrusted Pain and regarded him as an English spy, and he later admitted that he was really in the Sudan to write up an account of the Mahdi and his empire for Rochefort.

As the Mahdi was not present at El Obeid, Pain was allowed to go to him at Busata, where he again claimed that he was there "to lay before [him] the submission of the French nation". The Mahdi did not believe him either, and ordered him to be guarded and allowed to speak to nobody. He was then taken with the Mahdi to Shatt, but on the way he developed a fever and caught dysentery, falling from his camel on 15 November 1884. The Sudanese, assuming he was dead, buried him in the sand, but Joseph Ohrwalder thought it was "quite possible" that he was not dead. After Pain's death, Rochefort insinuated that he had been executed by Herbert Kitchener under the orders of Lord Wolseley, causing a minor diplomatic incident and endangering the lives of British diplomats in Paris. among the British themselves, Pain gained a negative reputation as "the Mahdi's Chancellor".
