= A Daughter of Australia (1912 film) =

- Directed by: Gaston Mervale
- Written by: Harry Beaumont
- Produced by: Harry Beaumont
- Starring: Louise Lovely; Harry Beaumont
- Release date: 12 February 1912 (Sydney)
- Running time: 3,000 or 4,000 feet
- Country: Australia
- Languages: Silent film English intertitles

A Daughter of Australia is a 1912 Australian silent film directed by Gaston Mervale starring Louise Lovely, then known as Louise Carbasse. It was set in the early days of the Australian goldfields and is considered a lost film.

== Release ==
The film made its premiere at the Alhambra Theatre in Sydney and was screening in cinemas as late as 1918, by which stage the star was billed as "Louise Lovely".

It was advertised as featuring "sensations from beginning to end, mingled with Love, Pathos, Humour, and Tragedy."
