= Gaston Mervale =

Australian film director

Gaston Mervale (1866–1959) was an English-born director and actor who worked on the English, Australian and US stage and directed Australian films. Born Gaston Mistowski in Torquay, Devon, England in 1866, after performing on stage in the UK he came to Australia in late 1897 to work for J.C. Williamson's. After returning to England he then appeared on stage for several years in New York. He returned to Australia in 1904 with the Tittell Brune Company. Early in 1911 he was employed to direct several films for the Australian Life Biograph Company, which featured actors Louise Lovely and Godfrey Cass. He worked in the US for the five years 1912-1917, on stage, acted in several films and was director of The Stubbornness of Geraldine in 1915. He returned to Australia in 1917 to produce plays. He died in Heidelberg, Victoria, Australia in 1959.

== Partial filmography as director ==
- One Hundred Years Ago (1911)
- A Ticket in Tatts (1911)
- The Colleen Bawn (1911)
- A Tale of the Australian Bush (1911)
- Hands Across the Sea (1912)
- A Daughter of Australia (1912)
- Conn, the Shaughraun (1912)
- The Wreck of the Dunbar or The Yeoman's Wedding (1912)
- The Ticket of Leave Man (1912)
- The Stubbornness of Geraldine (1915)
