= The Winning of Miss Construe =

1916 American drama film directed by Robert Z. Leonard

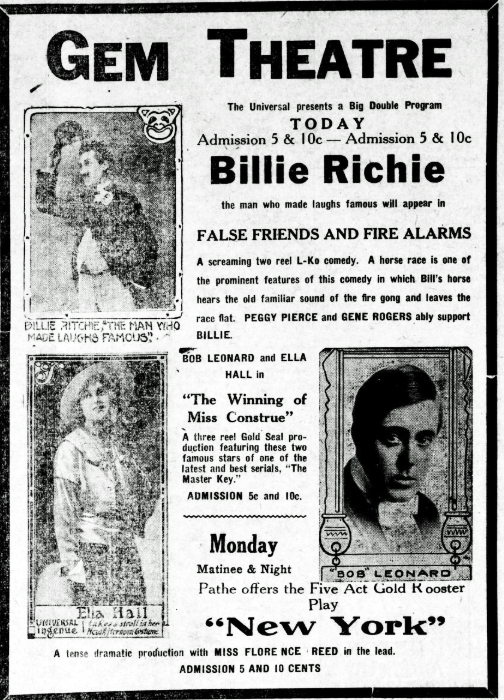
- Magazine ad for movie
- Directed by: David Kirkland; Robert Z. Leonard
- Starring: Robert Z. Leonard; Ella Hall
- Production company: Universal
- Distributed by: Gold Star
- Release date: March 17, 1916
- Running time: 33 minutes; 3 reels
- Country: United States
- Language: Silent (English intertitles)

The Winning of Miss Construe is a 1916 American silent comedy short film directed by Robert Z. Leonard and David Kirkland. The film stars Robert Z. Leonard and Ella Hall.

The film was produced by Universal, distributed by the Gold Star and released in the United States on March 17, 1916.

== Cast ==
| Actor | Role |
|---|---|
| Robert Z. Leonard | Bob - the Artist |
| Ella Hall | Ella Construe |
| Marc B. Robbins | Bill - the Actor(as Marc Robbins) |
| Kingsley Benedict | King - the Floorwalker |
| Betty Schade | Betty - the Shopgirl |

== Preservation ==
The film's current preservation status is unknown.
