= Ella Hall =

Silent American actress (1897–1981)

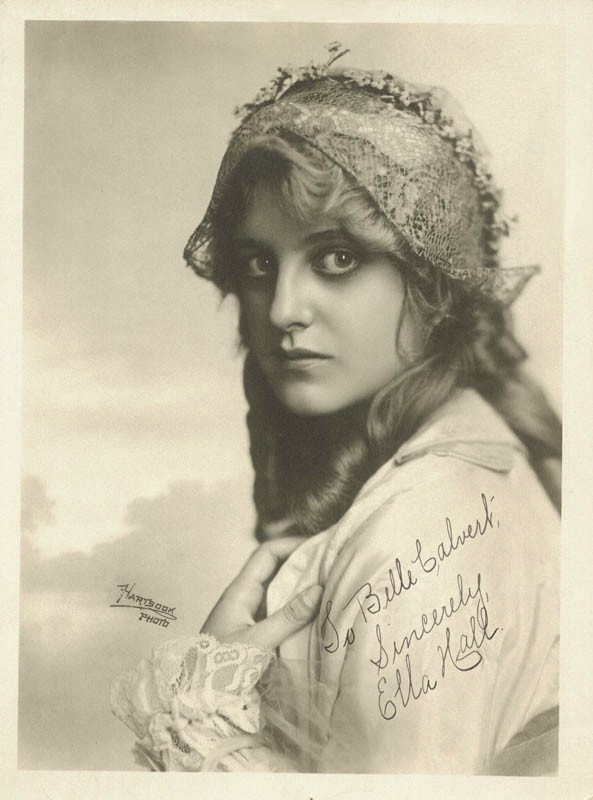
- Hall c. 1918
- Born: Ella Augusta Hall; March 17, 1897; Hoboken, New Jersey, U.S.
- Died: September 3, 1981 (aged 84); Los Angeles, California, U.S.
- Resting place: Forest Lawn Memorial Park, Glendale
- Occupations: Actress; producer
- Years active: 1906–1933
- Known for: Jewel 1915; The Bugler of Algiers 1916; Polly Redhead 1917
- Spouses: Emory Johnson (m. 1919; div. 1930) Charles Clow (m. 1934; ann. 1936)
- Children: 4, including Ellen Hall and Richard Emory
- Mother: Mary Hall actress

Ella Augusta Hall (March 17, 1897 – September 3, 1981) was an American actress. She appeared in more than 90 films between 1912 and 1933.

== Early years ==
Ella Augusta Hall was born in Hoboken, New Jersey on March 17, 1897. Her family moved to Hollywood in the early days of silent films so her mother, May Hall, could pursue an acting career.

== Career ==
Ella Hall's first credited film appearance was the lead role in the 1913 film Memories. Her career took off after that film, and she appeared in thirty-seven films from 1913 through the end of 1914. She had another thirty-nine film appearances from 1915 through 1919. She did not appear in another film until 1921. Her career had slowed considerably during this two-year break, and she starred in only seven more films. Her best-known film was The Flying Dutchman, released in 1923, which was her final silent film.

She had a minor appearance, uncredited, in the 1930 Cecil B. DeMille film Madam Satan. Her final film appearance was in 1933's The Bitter Tea of General Yen.

== Marriage, children and divorce ==
Carl Laemmle, head of Universal, went to Universal City to oversee the California plant. Once he wrapped up his business, he was slated to return to Universal's New York offices on the Santa Fe train. Before he left, he chose to host a gala on June 13, 1917. Invitations were sent out, and three thousand guests took advantage of Laemmle's offer. "The occasion promised to be one of the most noteworthy in the history of film functions."

Among the guests was Emory Johnson, 23, a Universal leading man currently in the third year of his contract. At an appropriate moment during the ball, glasses were clinked, and Emory Johnson and fellow universalite Ella Hall professed their love and announced their engagement. Hall had recently turned 20 years old.

Fast-forward to Thursday, September 6, 1917. Hall and Johnson were busy finishing their day's work for Universal. They worked until 2 pm. After they removed their makeup, they left the studios and were married in a private ceremony at 3 o'clock. After the ceremony, they hopped in Johnson's Hupmobile and drove off on their honeymoon. They were scheduled to return to work on October 1. After the honeymoon was over, the couple moved into Johnson's house along with Johnson's mother Emilie Johnson.

After their marriage, Johnson and Hall acted in four pictures together. They made their first together playing husband and wife in – My Little Boy released in December 1917. The movie was Johnson's first film with his bride. Johnson and Hall followed the release of that film with acting in New Love for Old (Feb 1918) and then, Beauty in Chains (Mar 1918). Their last film together was A Mother's Secret released on April 4, 1918.

In June 1918, Universal failed to renew the contracts of Ella Hall and Emory Johnson. Ella Hall was pregnant with their first child at the time of their release.

Their first son (Richard), Walter Emory, was born on January 27, 1919, in Santa Barbara, California. Their second son Bernard Alfred was born on September 26, 1920, in Santa Barbara, California. Their daughter Ellen Joanna was born in Los Angeles, California, on April 18, 1923.

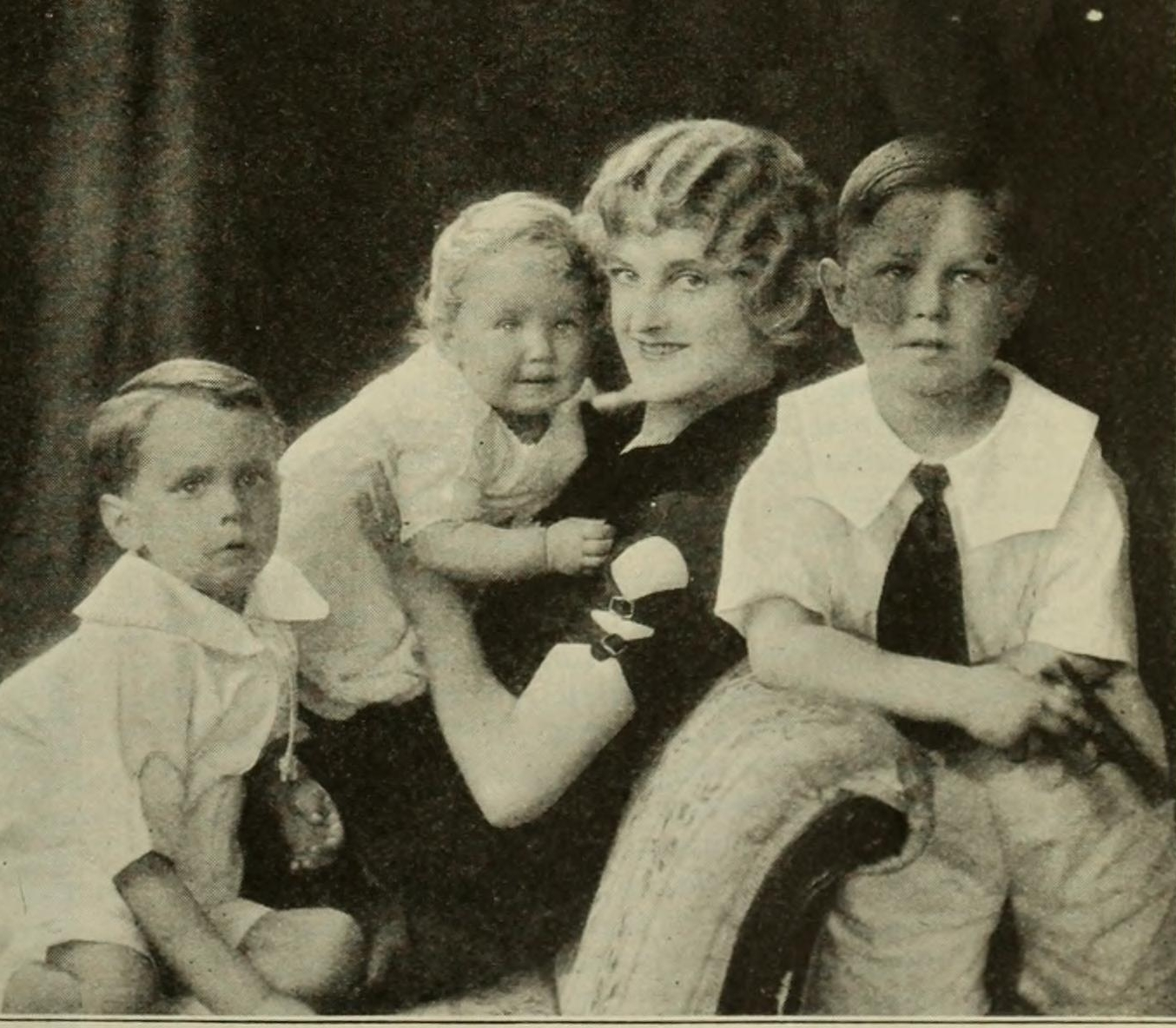
Hall with her children in 1924

By 1924, their marriage was falling apart, and they separated. Hall initially filed for divorce, but ultimately, they reconciled. A series of separations and reconciliations would follow.

The couple's disagreements about money, children, and their living situation were very public, from 1924 on. Their relationship was defined by repeated separations and reunions. It was difficult for Hall to reconcile her emotions toward Johnson's only-child status and what she viewed as his overdependence on his mother. She considered Emory to be overly attached to his mother, which strained their relationship. She thought her mother-in-law had too much control. Hall's frustration was summed up perfectly with the words, "Too much mother-in-law!"

In the 1920s, Johnson and her son became famous as Hollywood's only mother-son directing/writing team. She wrote all the stories and screenplays her son used to build his successful career directing melodramas.

Tragedy struck in March 1926. While Hall and the kids were walking down a street in Hollywood, the couple's five-year-old son, Bernard, was fatally struck by a truck. Bernard's death would provide a catalyst for another reconciliation.

Early 1929 saw another split, followed by a reconciliation. The pair decided to have a baby to make their relationship stronger. Dinie, or Diana Marie, was born on October 27, 1929, in Los Angeles, California. They would have no more children together.

"Two in a family can't be picture folk and stay married, and sometimes one can't either. So I'm in neither picture nor marriage"

— Ella Hall
September 1931

In 1930, their stormy relationship came to an end. The divorce between Johnson, 36, and Hall, 34, was finalized in Los Angeles, California. At one time, they were considered one of Hollywood's ideal marriages. After the divorce, their public and legal battles would continue.

Two of their children would follow their parents in the movie industry, Ellen Hall and Richard Emory.

In October 1934, Hall briefly wed wealthy sportsman Charles Clow. Legal complications arose in 1936. Appearing before Los Angeles superior court judge, Hall explained that her husband's first wife, Linda Lee Clows of Chicago, had his divorce from her set aside last April for the purpose of interposing a cross-Complaint making his marriage to Hall illegal. "I left my husband upon learning her action made our marriage illegal," Hall testified in court. The marriage was officially annulled on January 21, 1936.

== Death ==
Ella Hall, 84, was living in Los Angeles, California, when she died due to a stroke on September 3, 1981. Per her request, she was cremated. Her ashes were interred at Forest Lawn's Columbarium of Sunlight in Glendale, California. (Note: Death certificate - Ella Augusta Hall death certificate is available for purchase from the Registrar-Recorder/County Clerk for Birth, Death & Marriage Records in Norwalk, California Certificate of Death 0190 040428; Ella Hall Died: September 3, 1981, 07:07; Born New Jersey March 17, 1897, Age – 84 yrs old; Father – Unk; Mother – Mary Muller, New York Occupation – Housemaker Usual residence: 22437 Victory Blvd, Los Angeles Informant H. Edward Moxley, Son-in-law, same address Death Certificate signed September 3, 1981 Death caused by massive cardiovascular accident Stroke)

In November 1984, Hall's youngest daughter, Diana Marie (Dinie) Moxley, died in Los Angeles at 55. Her only surviving son, Richard Emory 75, died in 1994. In March 1999, Hall's oldest daughter, Ellen Hall, died in Bellevue, Nebraska. She was 75 and living with her son. Like her mother, she was cremated, and then her ashes were transported west to Forest Lawn Memorial Park.

Hall's former spouse, Emory Johnson died in San Mateo, California on April 18, 1960, from burns suffered in a fire.

== Filmography ==
Introduction

This film catalogue is the verified filmography of Ella Hall. The sources used to compile this listing are trustworthy and were verified through archives and historical records, including trade publications, newspaper reviews, and published filmography references.

However, some of Hall's film work may have been missed, especially her early uncredited roles and her cameos after 1923. These omissions stem from imperfect record-keeping, particularly in the film industry's early days, when credits were not consistent, and documentation was often lacking.

As ongoing research and archival discoveries continue to shed new light on early cinema, this filmography may be revised to reflect additional verified findings.

Film authentication

The films in this compilation were verified using the following references.

- Hall's known appearances in Short films were verified using the following sources: (Note: 1. The American Film Institute website - AFI Catalog contains entries for over 17,000 short films from the early days of cinema; 2. American Film Personnel and Company Credits, 1908–1920; 3. A Biographical Dictionary of Silent Film Western Actors and Actresses; 4. An Encyclopedic Dictionary of Women in Early American Films: 1895–1930; 5. The Encyclopedia of Feature Players of Hollywood; 6. Lois Weber: The Director who Lost Her Way in History; 7. The Braff silent short film working papers 1903–1929; 8. The Internet Archive located @ Internet Archive is a non-profit library of millions of free texts, movies, software, music, websites, and more; 9. The Universal Silents: A Filmography of the Universal Motion Picture Manufacturing Company, 1912–1929)
- Hall's known appearances in Feature films were verified using the following sources: (Note: 1. The American Film Institute website; 2. An Encyclopedic Dictionary of Women in Early American Films: 1895–1930)

◆ Filmography of Ella Hall (97 films) ◆
Year	Title	Role	Director	Production	Distribution	Released	Genre	Length	Notes
1912	Hot Stuff	Party Guest	Sennett	Biograph	General Film	1912-03-21	Comedy	Short; 8 mins	
1912	The School Teacher and the Waif	Schoolgirl	Griffith	Biograph	General Film	1912-06-27	Comedy	Short; 17 mins	
1913 (10)	Parson Jim's Baby		Miles	Kinemacolor	Kinemacolor	1913-05-01	Western	Short	
1913 (10)	Love in the Dark	Bertha Benson	Miles	Kinemacolor	Kinemacolor	1913-05-31	Romance	Short	
1913 (10)	Local Color		Miles	Kinemacolor	Kinemacolor	1913-06-21	Comedy	Short	
1913 (10)	When Love Grows Up		Miles	Kinemacolor	Kinemacolor	1913-07-01	Drama	Short	
1913 (10)	Memories	Personification of Youth	Smalley-Weber	Rex	Universal	1913-10-16	Romance	Short	
1913 (10)	The Haunted Bride	The Maid	Smalley-Weber	Rex	Universal	1913-11-09	Comedy	Short	
1913 (10)	The Blood Brotherhood	The Crippled Girl	Smalley-Weber	Rex	Universal	1913-11-16	Drama	Short	
1913 (10)	James Lee's Wife	The Milkmaid	Smalley-Weber	Rex	Universal	1913-12-07	Drama	Short	
1913 (10)	The Mask	Lois' Invalid Sister	Smalley-Weber	Rex	Universal	1913-12-14	Crime	Short	
1913 (10)	The Jew's Christmas	Eleanor – Isaac's Granddaughter	Smalley-Weber	Rex	Universal	1913-12-18	Drama	Short	
1914 (34)	The Female of the Species	The Sheriff's Sweetheart	Smalley-Weber	Rex	Universal	1914-01-01	Drama	Short	
1914 (34)	A Fool and His Money	Ella – the Waitress	Smalley-Weber	Rex	Universal	1914-01-04	Comedy	Short	
1914 (34)	The Coward Hater	Jane – a Schoolteacher	Smalley-Weber	Rex	Universal	1914-02-08	Drama	Short	
1914 (34)	Woman's Burden	Peggy's Sister	Weber	Rex	Universal	1914-02-22	Drama	Short	
1914 (34)	The Weaker Sister		Weber	Rex	Universal	1914-03-01	Drama	Short	
1914 (34)	A Modern Fairy Tale	The Princess	Weber	Rex	Universal	1914-03-08	Drama	Short	
1914 (34)	The Man Who Slept	Mary	Weber	Rex	Universal	1914-04-09	Drama	Short	
1914 (34)	An Episode		Smalley-Weber	Rex	Universal	1914-04-30	Romance	Short	
1914 (34)	The Career of Waterloo Peterson	Herself, Actress	Smalley-Weber	Rex	Universal	1914-05-10	Comedy	Short; 6 mins	
1914 (34)	The Triumph of Mind	Crooked Trill	Weber	Bison		1914-05-23	Drama	Short	
1914 (34)	The Stone in the Road		Weber	Rex	Universal	1914-05-31	Drama	Short	
1914 (34)	The Spy	Frances Wharton	Turner	Universal	Universal	1914-06-01	Drama	Feature	
1914 (34)	The Pursuit of Hate	The Graves' Daughter	Weber	Rex	Universal	1914-06-14	Drama	Short	
1914 (34)	The Sherlock Boob		Leonard	Rex	Universal	1914-06-21	Comedy	Short	
1914 (34)	Lost by a Hair	Another Summer Girl	Smalley-Weber	Rex	Universal	1914-06-28	Comedy	Short	
1914 (34)	The House Discordant	Mary – Son's Sweetheart	Leonard	Rex	Universal	1914-07-02	Drama	Short	
1914 (34)	When Fate Disposes	Ella	Leonard	Rex	Universal	1914-07-08	Romance	Short	
1914 (34)	The Great Universal Mystery	Self	Allan Dwan	Nestor	Universal	1914-07-10	Mystery	Short	
1914 (34)	Out of the Darkness	The Thief's Daughter	Leonard	Rex	Universal	1914-07-19	Drama	Short	
1914 (34)	At the Foot of the Stairs	The Maid	Turner	Rex	Universal	1914-07-23	Drama	Short	
1914 (34)	An Awkward Cinderella	Ella – the New Maid	Turner	Rex	Universal	1914-07-26	Comedy	Short	
1914 (34)	The Symphony of Souls	Elaine	Ingram	Rex	Universal	1914-08-06	Romance	Short	
1914 (34)	The Hedge Between	Ella	Leonard	Rex	Universal	1914-08-16	Drama	Short	
1914 (34)	The Bowl of Roses		Leonard	Rex	Universal	1914-08-20	Comedy	Short	
1914 (34)	For the Secret Service	Constance Chambers	Leonard	Rex	Universal	1914-08-27	Drama	Short	
1914 (34)	The Boob's Nemesis	The Farmer's Daughter	Leonard	Rex	Universal	1914-09-06	Drama	Short	
1914 (34)	The Mistress of Deadwood Basin	Eveline Danvers	Leonard	Rex	Universal	1914-09-17	Western	Short	
1914 (34)	The Little Sister	The Little Sister	Leonard	Rex	Universal	1914-09-24	Drama	Short	
1914 (34)	The Boob's Legacy	The Boob's Country Sweetheart	Leonard	Rex	Universal	1914-10-01	Comedy	Short	
1914 (34)	Olaf Erickson, Boss	The Stranger's Daughter	Leonard	Rex	Universal	1914-10-22	Drama	Short	
1914 (34)	The Decision	The Younger Sister	Leonard	Rex	Universal	1914-10-25	Drama	Short	
1914 (34)	White Roses	The Newsgirl		Rex	Universal	1914-10-29	Drama	Short	
1914 (34)	The Master Key	Ruth Gallon	Leonard	Universal	Universal	1914-11-16	Drama	Serial; 15 eps	(Note: The entire serial film is presumed lost except Print exists in the Library of Congress film archive [chapter 5 only].)
1914 (34)	His Uncle's Will	The Country Girl	Leonard	Rex	Universal	1914-11-19	Drama	Short	
1915 (12)	The Heart of Lincoln		Ford	Universal	Universal	1915-02-09	War	Short	
1915 (12)	Mavis of the Glen	Mavis Graham	Leonard	Universal	Universal	1915-04-21	Drama	Short	
1915 (12)	Shattered Memories	Jane Marsh	Leonard	Universal	Universal	1915-05-25	Drama	Short	
1915 (12)	The Silent Command	Ella – the Daughter	Leonard	Universal	Universal	1915-06-02	Mystery	Feature	
1915 (12)	A Boob's Romance	The Boob's Sweetheart	Leonard	Universal	Universal	1915-06-23	Comedy	Short	
1915 (12)	Betty's Dream Hero	Betty	Leonard	Universal	Universal	1915-07-07	Romance	Short	
1915 (12)	Heritage	Kate	Leonard	Universal	Universal	1915-07-29	Drama	Short	
1915 (12)	The Little Blonde in Black	The Blonde in Black	Leonard	Universal	Universal	1915-08-19	Romance	Short	
1915 (12)	Jewel	Jewel	Smalley-Weber	Universal	Universal	1915-08-30	Drama	Feature	
1915 (12)	Both Sides of Life	Ella – a Waif of Circumstance	Leonard	Universal	Universal	1915-09-09	Drama	Short	
1915 (12)	Idols of Clay	The Little Girl Next Door	Leonard	Universal	Universal	1915-12-07	Drama	Short	(Note: A complete print of Idols of Clay is held by Gosfilmofond in Moscow.)
1915 (12)	Christmas Memories	Little Sunshine	Leonard	Universal	Universal	1915-12-21	Drama	Feature	
1916 (13)	The Boob's Victory	The Detectress	Leonard	Universal	Universal	1916-01-11	Comedy	Short	
1916 (13)	The Silent Member	Undetermined Role	Leonard	Rex	Universal	1916-01-18	Drama	Short	
1916 (13)	Secret Love	Arnice	Leonard	Universal	Universal	1916-01-31	Drama		(Note: This is the first film made under Universal's "Bluebird" banner.)
1916 (13)	A Child of Circumstances	The Little Thief		Rex	Universal	1916-02-04	Crime	Short	
1916 (13)	Yust from Sweden	Hilda Jensen	Leonard	Universal	Universal	1916-02-08	Drama	Short	
1916 (13)	The Winning of Miss Construe	Ella Construe	Kirkland-Leonard	Universal	Universal	1916-03-07	Comedy	Short	
1916 (13)	The Crippled Hand	The Little Girl	Leonard	Universal	Universal	1916-05-01	Drama		
1916 (13)	The Silent Man of Timber Gulch	The Silent Man's Wife	Leonard	Universal	Universal	1916-05-30	Drama	Short	
1916 (13)	The Love Girl	Ambrosia	Leonard	Universal	Universal	1916-07-10	Comedy		
1916 (13)	Little Eve Edgarton	Eve Edgarton	Leonard	Universal	Universal	1916-08-21	Comedy		
1916 (13)	The Heart of a Show Girl	Elspeth Marner	Worthington	Rex	Universal	1916-08-28	Drama	Short	
1916 (13)	The Unfinished Case		Leonard	Rex	Universal	1916-10-09	Drama	Short	
1916 (13)	The Bugler of Algiers	Gabrielle	Julian	Universal	Universal	1916-11-27	Drama		(Note: Also known as We Are French)
1917 (7)	Her Soul's Inspiration	Mary Weston	Conway	Universal	Universal	1917-01-15	Drama		
1917 (7)	Polly Redhead	Polly Redhead	Conway	Universal	Universal	1917-03-19	Comedy		
1917 (7)	A Jewel in Pawn	Nora Martin	Conway	Universal	Universal	1917-04-16	Drama		
1917 (7)	The Little Orphan	Rene Lescere	Conway	Universal	Universal	1917-06-18	Drama		
1917 (7)	The Charmer	Ambrosia Lee	Conway	Universal	Universal	1917-08-27	Drama		
1917 (7)	The Spotted Lily	Yvonne	Solter	Universal	Universal	1917-10-01	Drama		
1917 (7)	My Little Boy	Clara	Wilson	Universal	Universal	1917-12-17	Drama		
1918 (6)	New Love for Old	Daphne Sawyer	Wilson	Universal	Universal	1918-02-11	Drama		(Note: Ella Hall also produced this film)
1918 (6)	Beauty in Chains	Rosarita	Wilson	Universal	Universal	1918-03-11	Drama	Feature	
1918 (6)	A Mother's Secret	Angela	Gerrard	Universal	Universal	1918-04-29	Drama		
1918 (6)	Which Woman?	Doris Standish	Browning-Pollard	Universal	Universal	1918-06-10	Mystery		
1918 (6)	Three Mounted Men	Undetermined Role	Ford	Universal	Universal	1918-10-07	Western	Feature	
1918 (6)	The Heart of Rachael	Billy	Hickman	Barriscale	General Film	1918-10-14	Drama	Feature	
1919	Under the Top	Pansy O'Neill	Crisp	Lasky	Lasky	1919-01-12	Comedy	Feature	
1921	The Great Reward	The Princess	Ford	Burston Films	National Exchange	1921-05-09	Drama	Serial	
1922	In the Name of the Law	Mary – age 18	Johnson	FBO	FBO	1922-08-16	Drama	Feature	
1922	The Heart of Lincoln		Ford	New Era	Anchor Film	1922-11-01	War	Feature	
1923	The Third Alarm	June Rutherford	Johnson	FBO	FBO	1923-01-07	Drama	Feature	
1923	The West~Bound Limited	Esther Miller	Johnson	FBO	FBO	1923-04-15	Drama	Feature	
1923	The Flying Dutchman	Zoe	Carleton	FBO	FBO	1923-07-29	Drama	Feature	
1930	All Quiet on the Western Front	Nurse	Milestone	Universal	Universal	1930-04-21	War	Feature	(Note: Quote from the interview of Hall's son, Richard Emory, in the book - The Encyclopedia of Feature Players of Hollywood: "When he was about eleven years old he accompanied his mother to the set of All Quiet on the Western Front. "I went down to the location in Laguna," he recalled. "The trenches and everything were so realistic it was frightening. Mother worked on it for a few days in the hospital scene where she played a nurse. I guess I was of age and they had me throw a vase of flowers in a scene and hit the door; they may have cut it out." — Richard Emory) (Note: Quoted from Obituaries section of the March 30, 1999 issue of The Modesto Bee listing Ellen Hall: "Born, in Los Angeles to parents in the film industry, Langer appeared in All Quiet on the Western Front at age 7." — Modesto Bee)
1930	Madam Satan		DeMille	MGM	MGM	1930-09-24	Musical	Feature	
1931	Street Scene	mob scene extra	Vidor	Goldwyn	Goldwyn	1931-08-26	Drama	Feature	
1932	Taxi	Trial Spectator	Ruth	Warner	Warner	1932-01-23	Drama	Feature	
1932	Rasputin and the Empress	Lady in waiting	Boleslawski	MGM	MGM	1932-12-23	Drama	Feature	(Note: Hollywood, California – where are the stars of yesterday? Curiosity, as to the fact of those who had their big day before the camera and slipped into limbo of forgotten favorites reveals that many of these big names of a few years ago are still active in pictures, though in minor capacities. Ella Hall, who retired from the screen at the time of her marriage to director Emory Johnson, is back again. She played a lady in waiting in "Rasputin," with the Barrymore's.)
1933	The Bitter Tea of General Yen	Mrs. Amelia Hansen	Capra	Columbia	Columbia	1933-01-06	War	Feature	(Note: Visual inspection verified the Hall's role in the film.)
◆◆◆ Legend◆◆◆: Denotes feature film with Universal Bluebird branding (Note: What is Universal Branding — Major film studios owned many movie houses. This enabled them to have guaranteed outlets for their products. Since Universal-owned no theaters, they needed a solution advising exhibitors on the type of movie they received. Universal responded by forming a three-tier branding system for their films based on the size of their budget and status. In the book "The Universal Story," Hirschhorn describes the branding as "the low budget, Red Feather programmers, the more ambitious Bluebird releases, and the occasional Prestige or Jewel production." An article in The Moving Picture World explains the Bluebird moniker – we adopted the name of Bluebird Photoplays because this company is the harbinger of the very best that can be produced in features. A "Motography" article dated April 28, 1917, announced – A new brand of feature photoplays will be offered for release, though Universal exchanges under the brand name of Butterfly Pictures. The Bluebird and Butterfly branding was the brainchild of Carl Laemmle, and both brands exposed his faddish philosophy of "... THE PLAY is always greater than the star". This branding was Laemmle's rather blatant attempt to blunt the proliferation of the star system he had created. Laemmle's filmmaking perspective did not last long. The ticket-buying audience he serviced went to the movies to see their favorite stars, not the vehicle allowing them to perform. The branding system had a brief existence and by 1920 had faded away.); Participation verified in an uncredited role; Film is extant otherwise film is presumed lost; Film made jointly with Robert Z. Leonard; Film made jointly with Emory Johnson

== Gallery ==
Ella Hall's Family

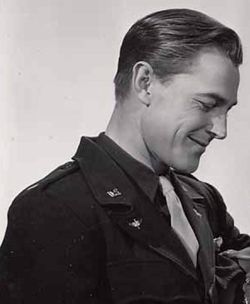
Richard Emory
Oldest son
1952

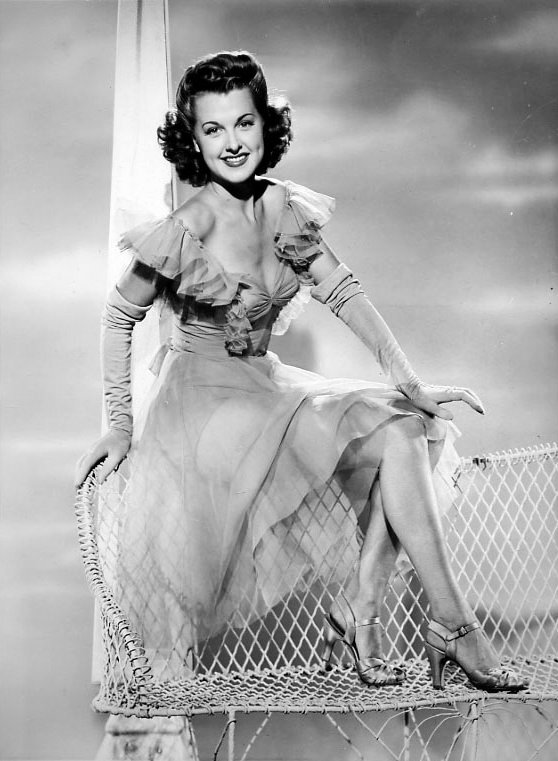
Ellen Hall
Oldest daughter
1944
Ella Hall timeline

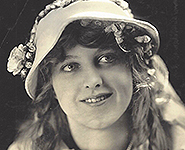
1914

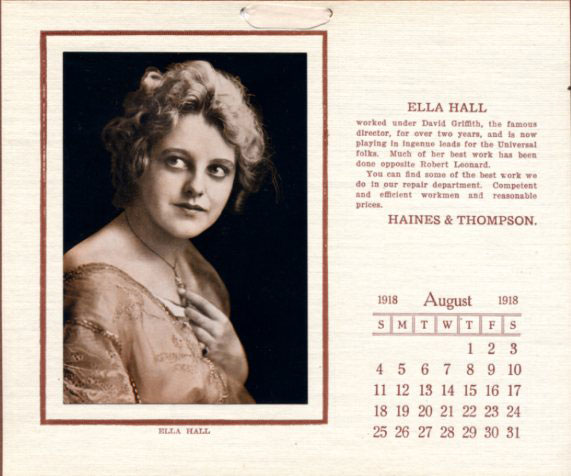
1918

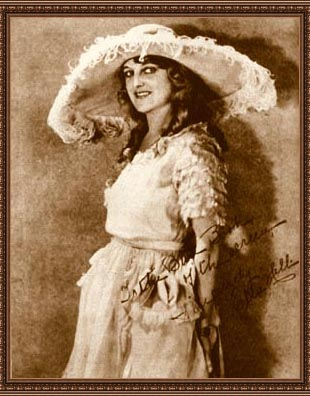
1923

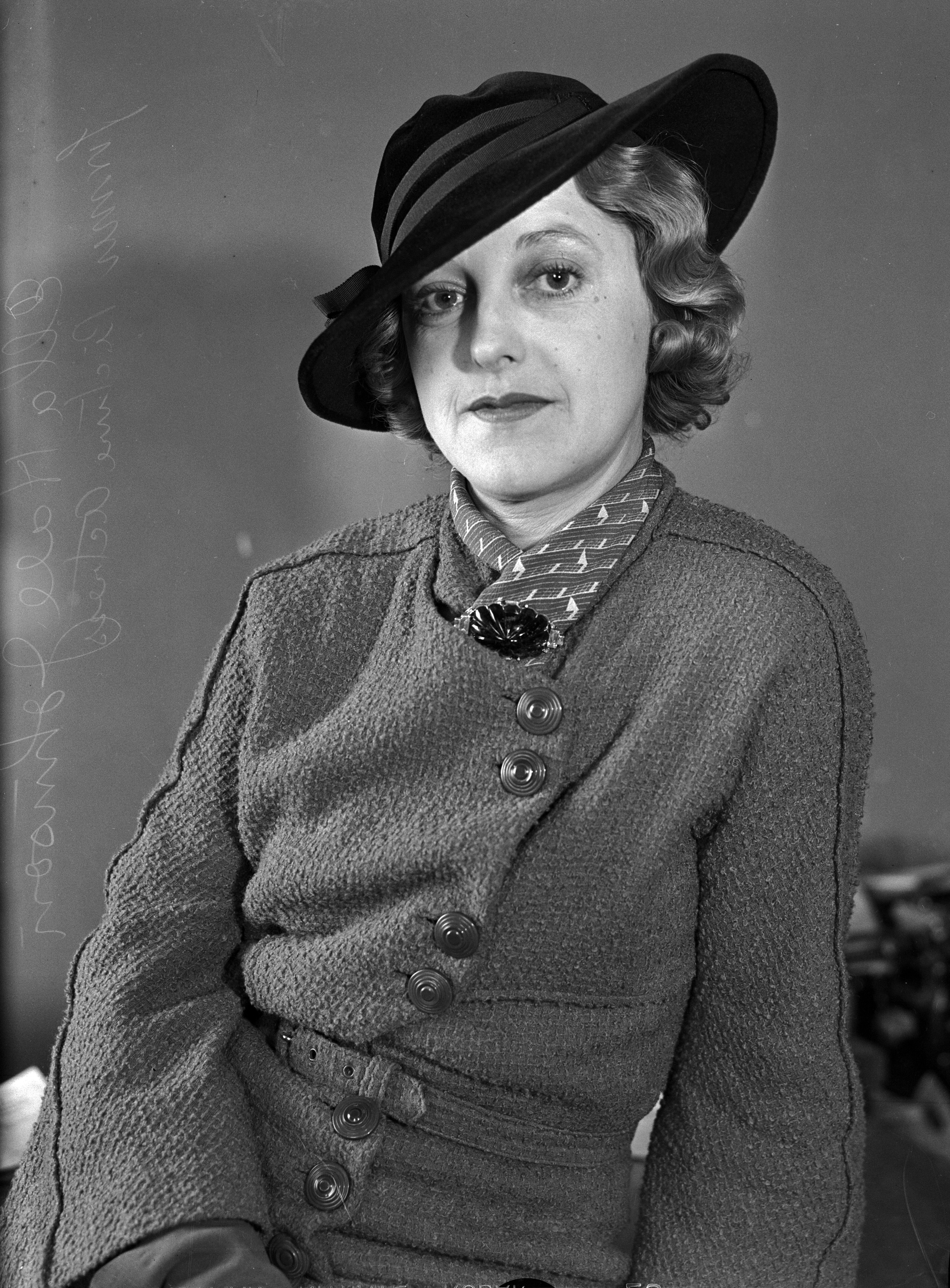
1936
From 1916–1918, Ella Hall acted in 15 Bluebird Photoplays.

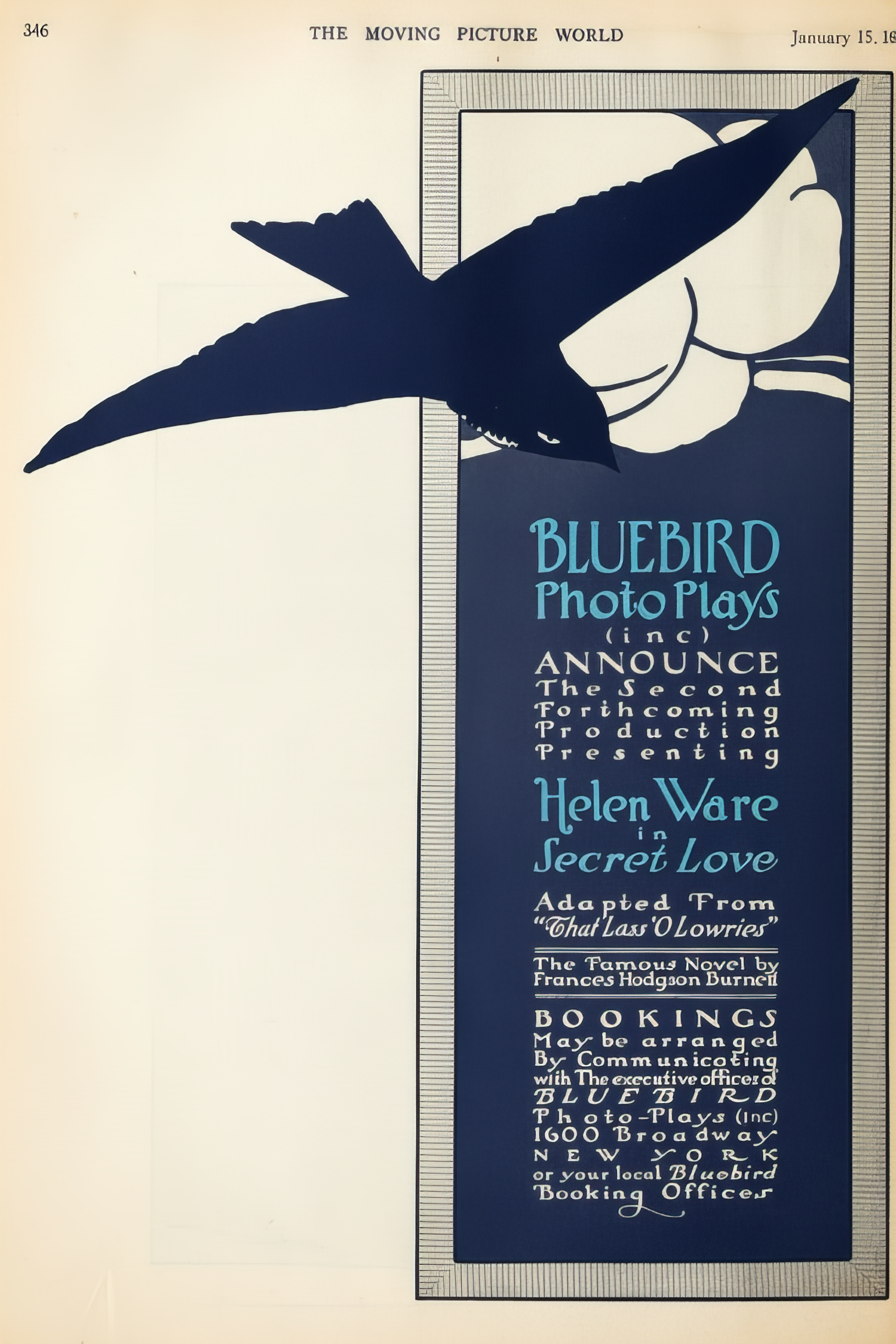
Secret Love
Jan 1916

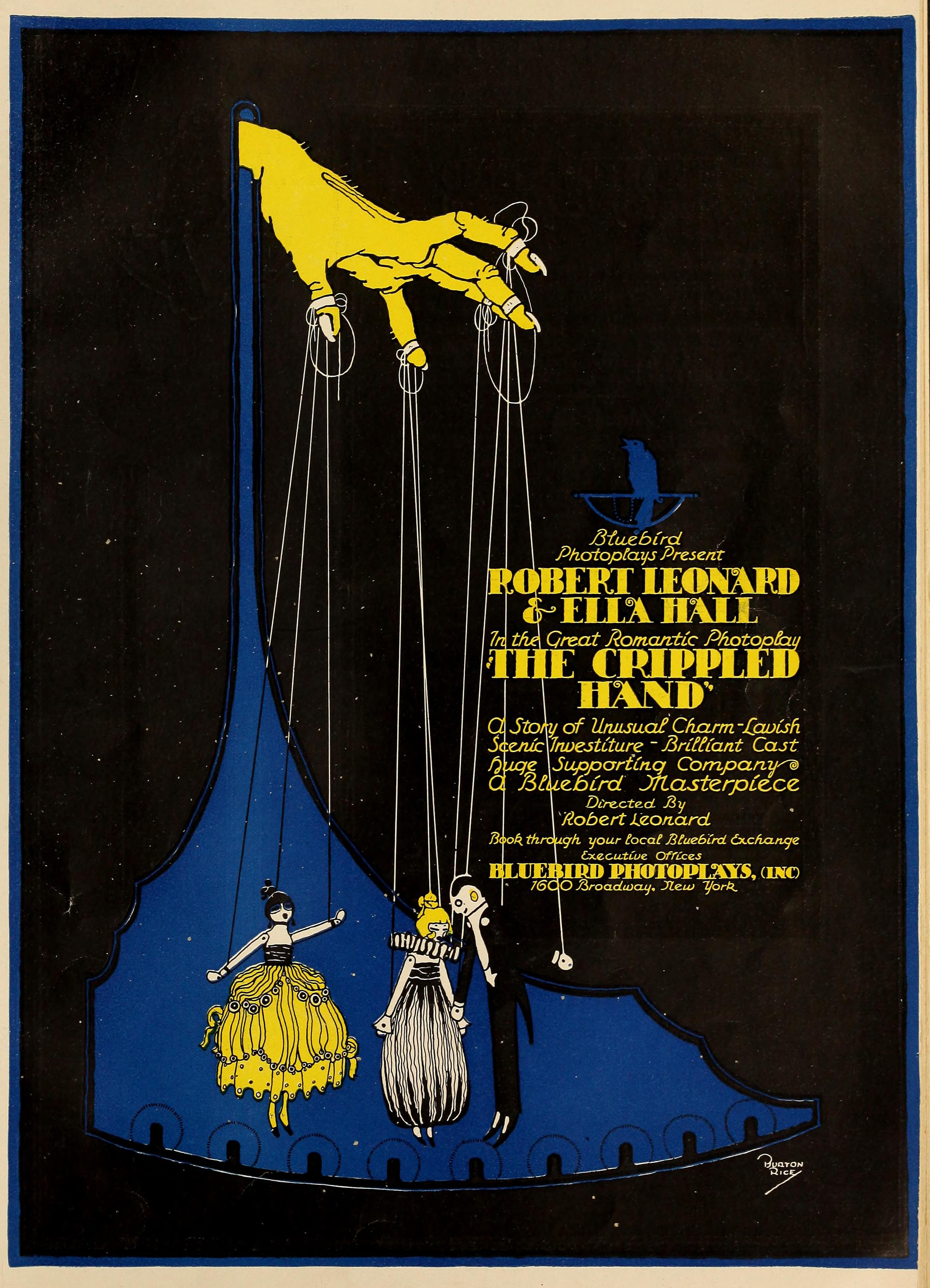
The Crippled Hand
May 1916

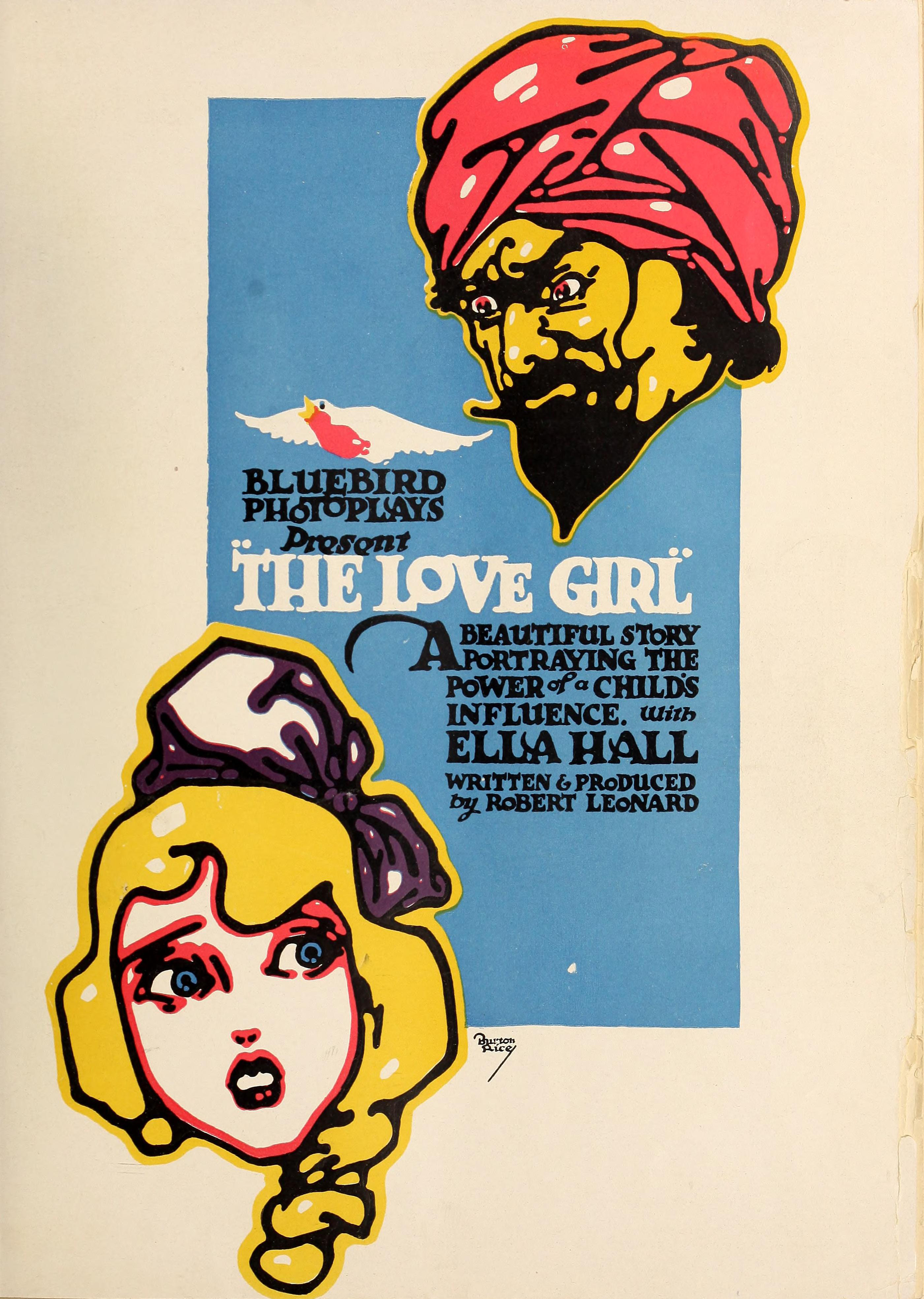
The Love Girl
Jul 1916

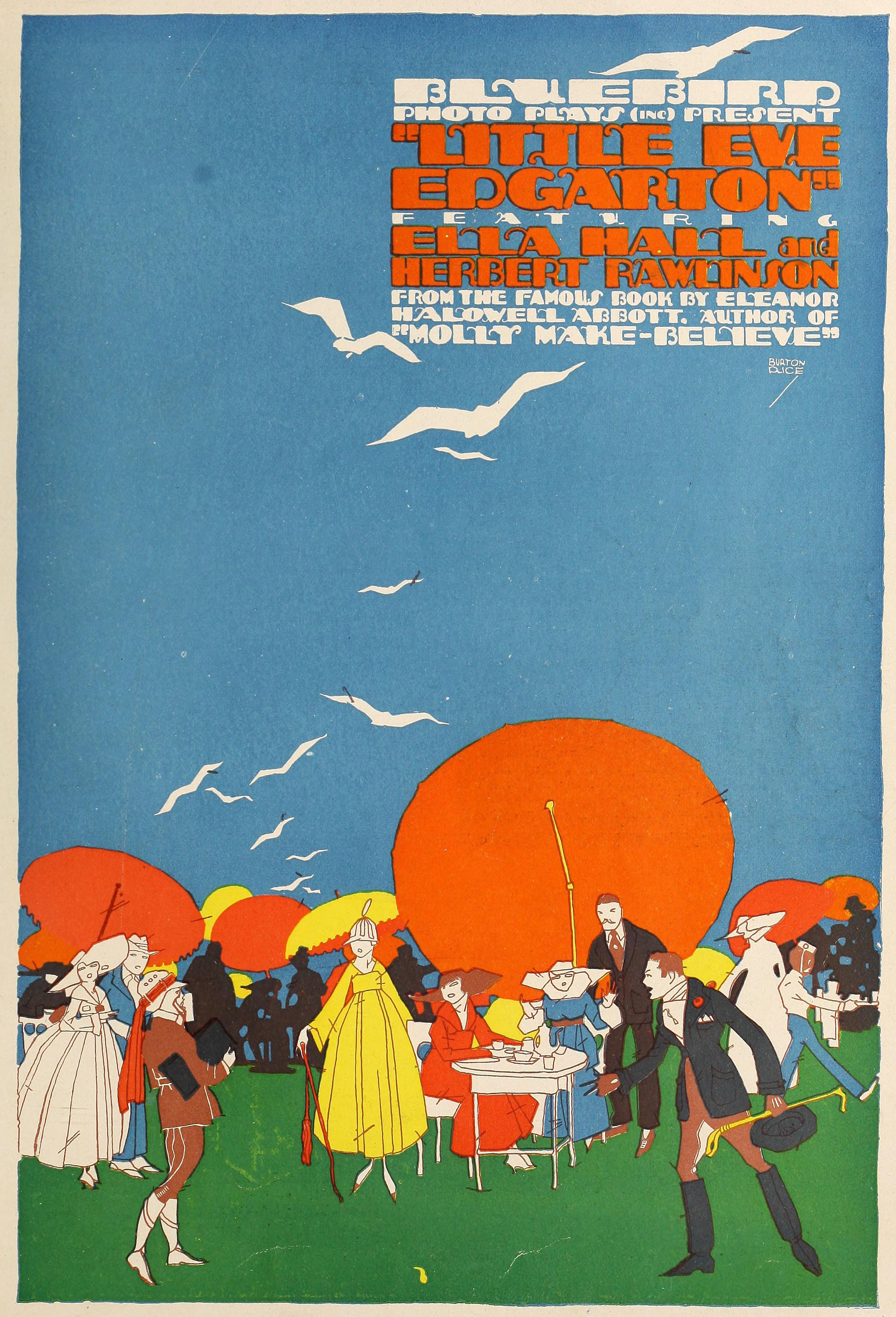
Little Eve Edgarton
Aug 1916

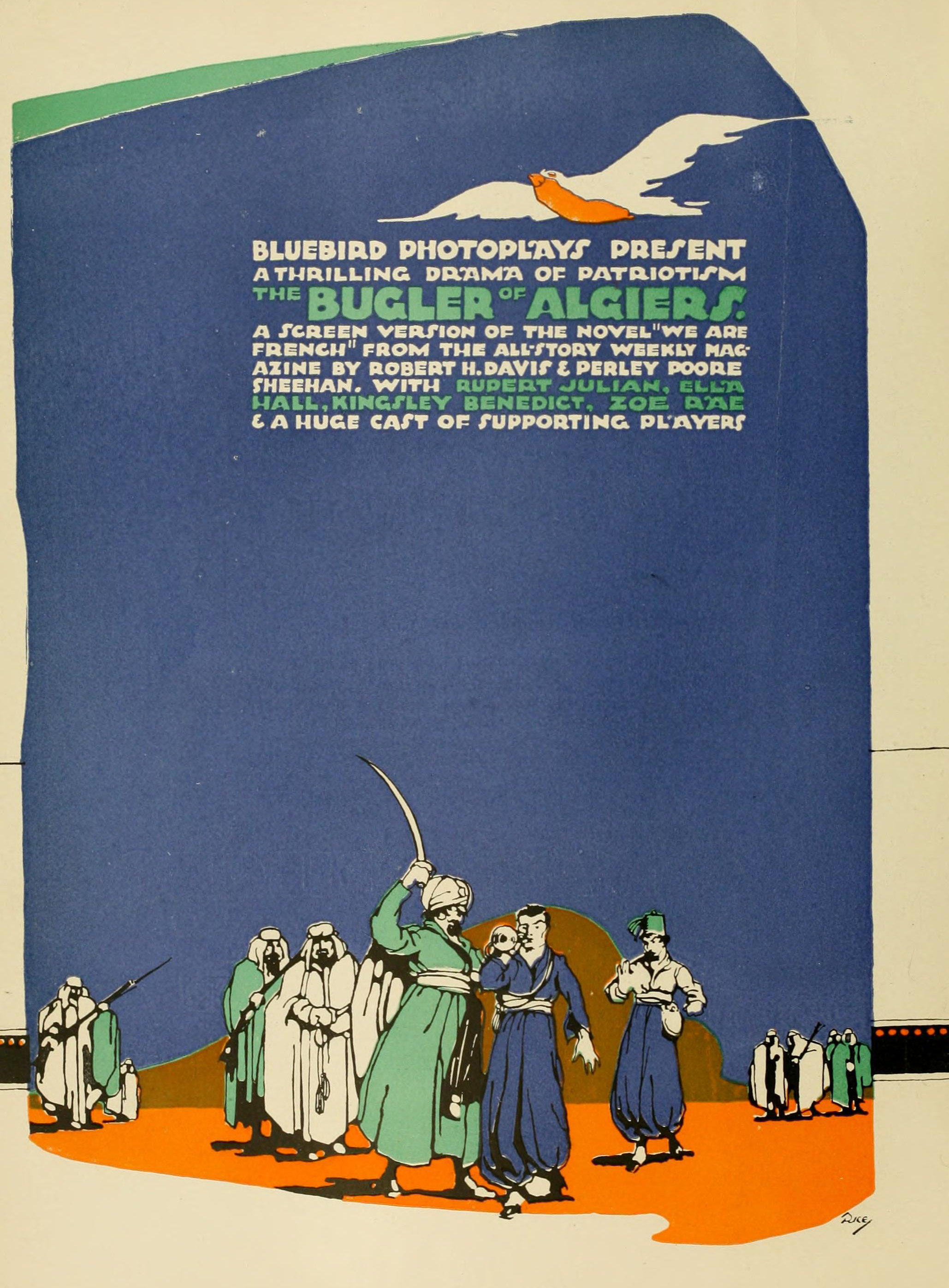
The Bugler of Algiers
Nov 1916

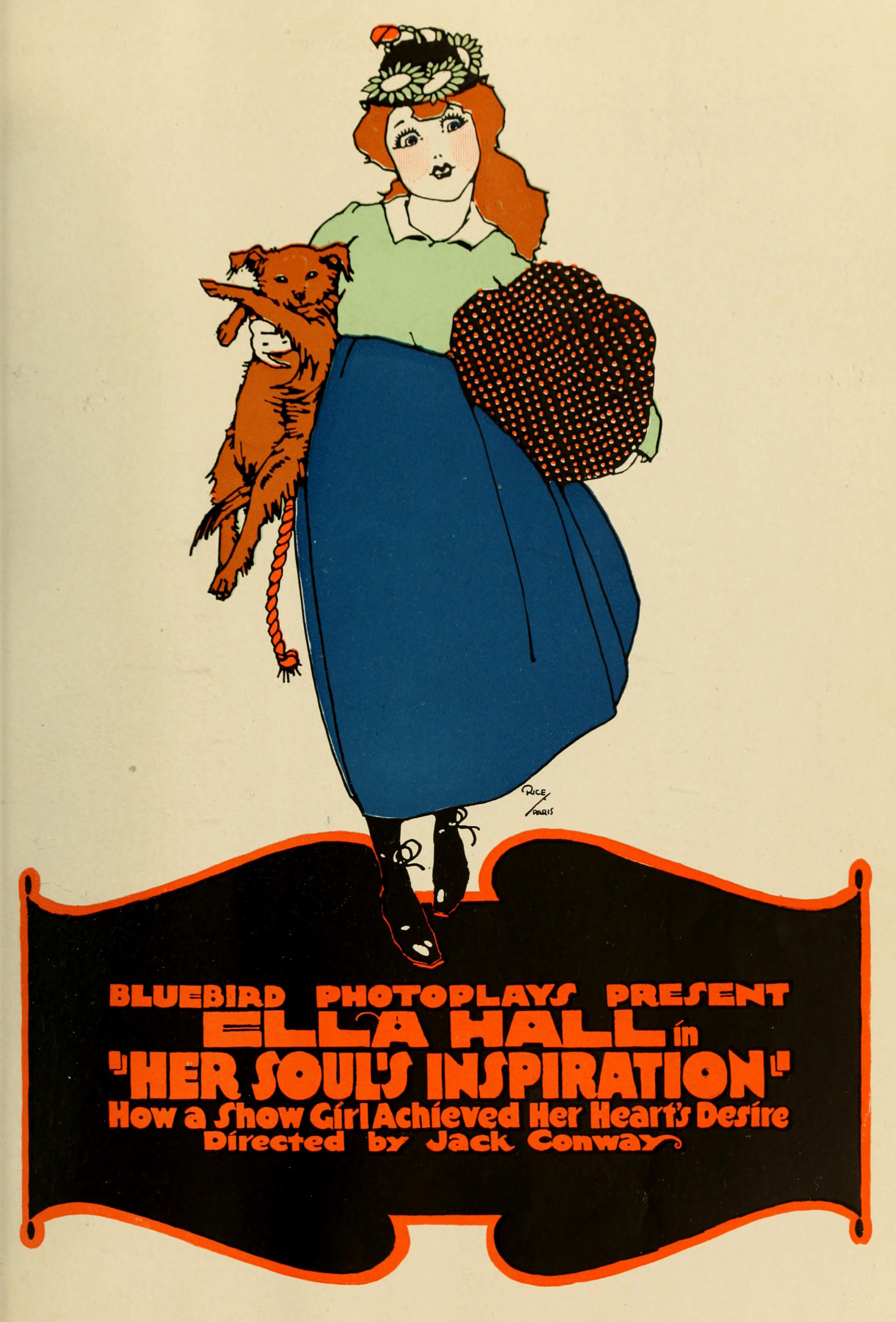
Her Soul's Inspiration
Jan 1917

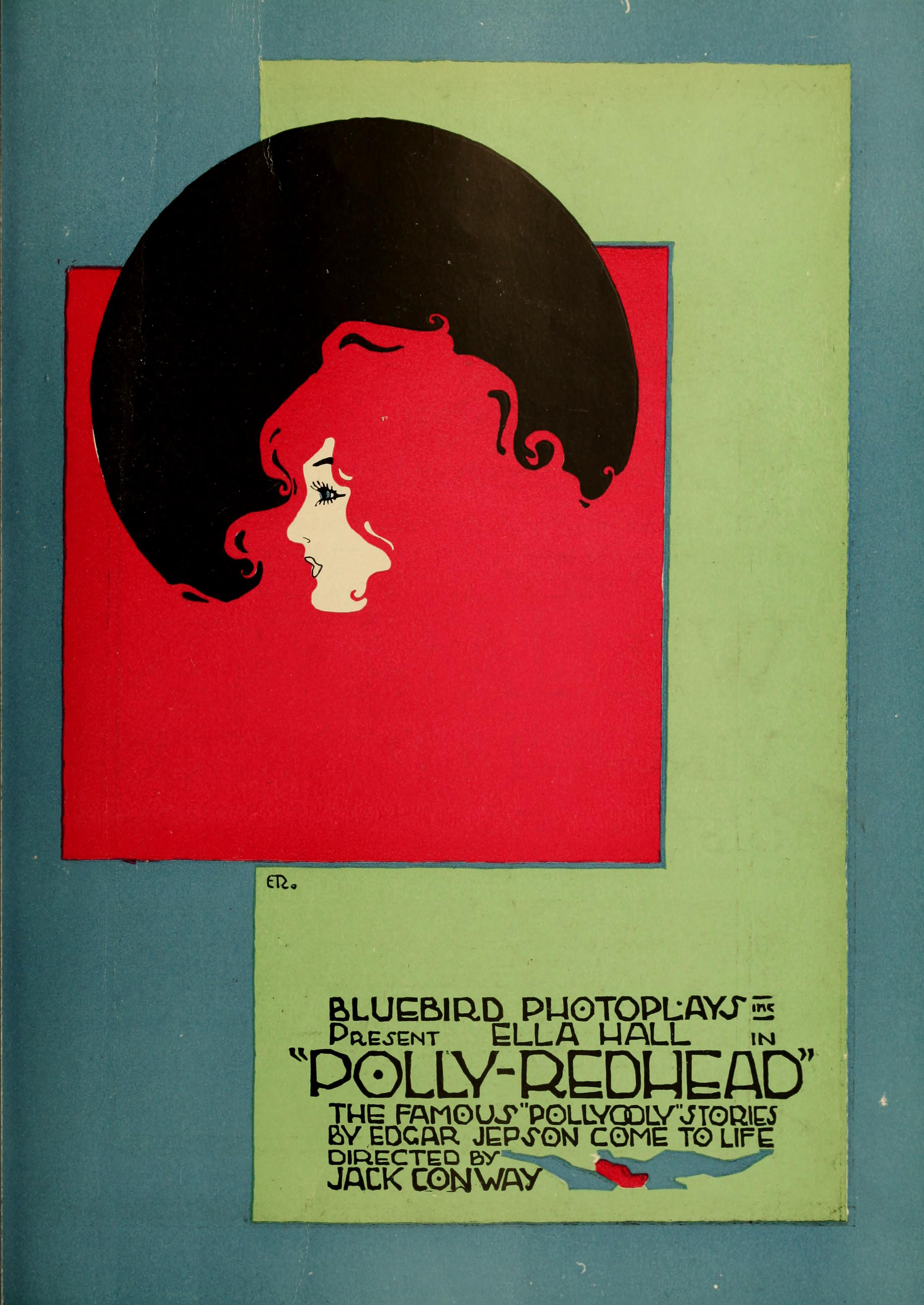
Polly Redhead
Mar 1917

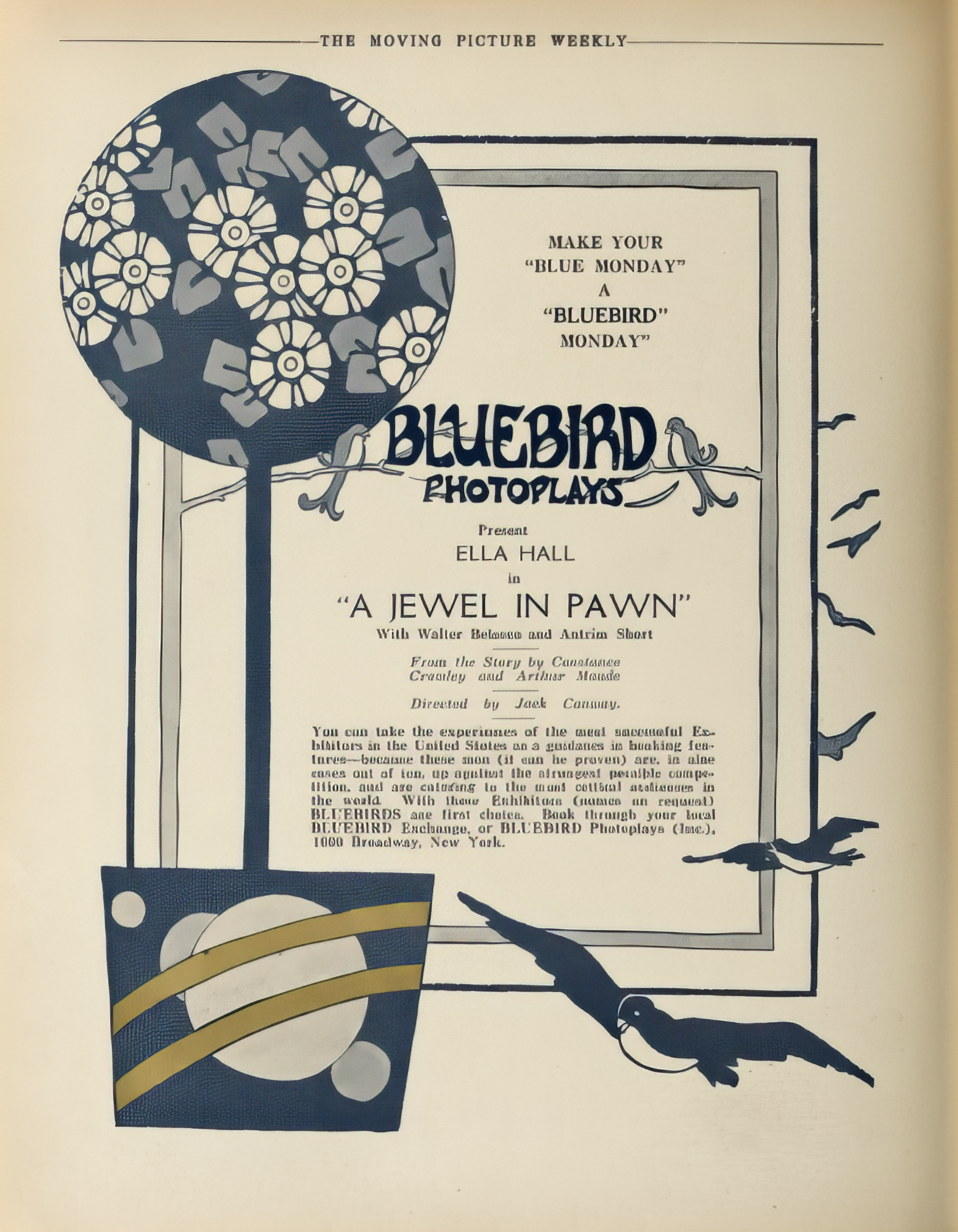
A Jewel in Pawn
Apr 1917

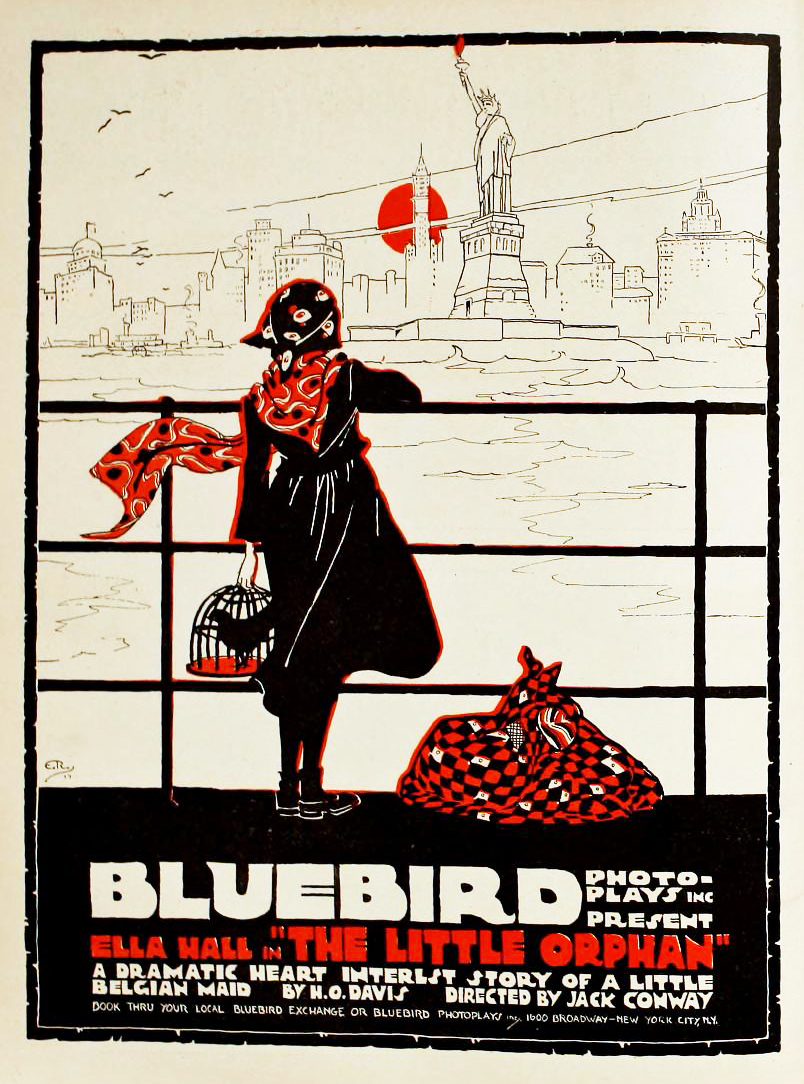
The Little Orphan
Jun 1917

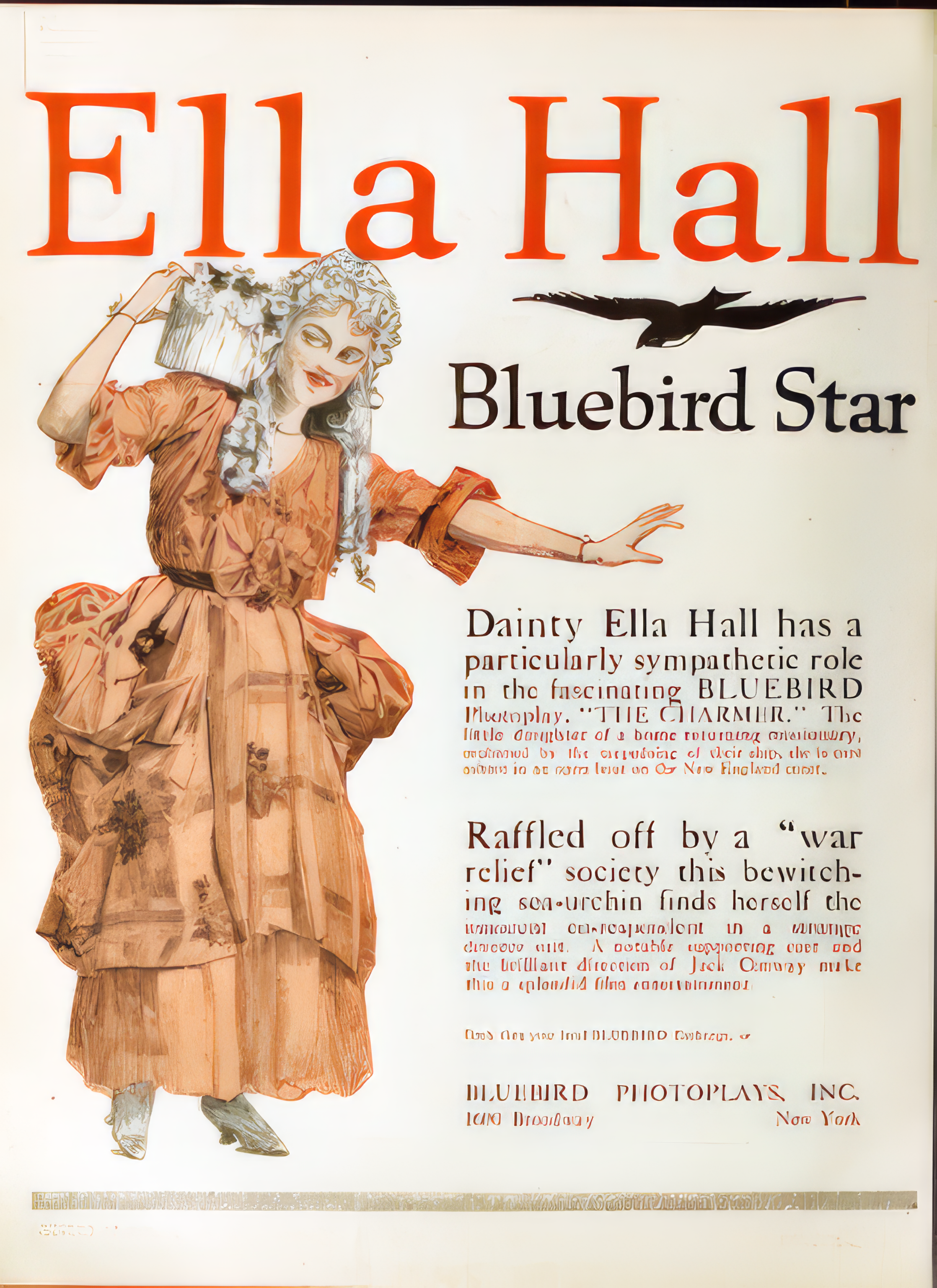
The Charmer
Aug 1918

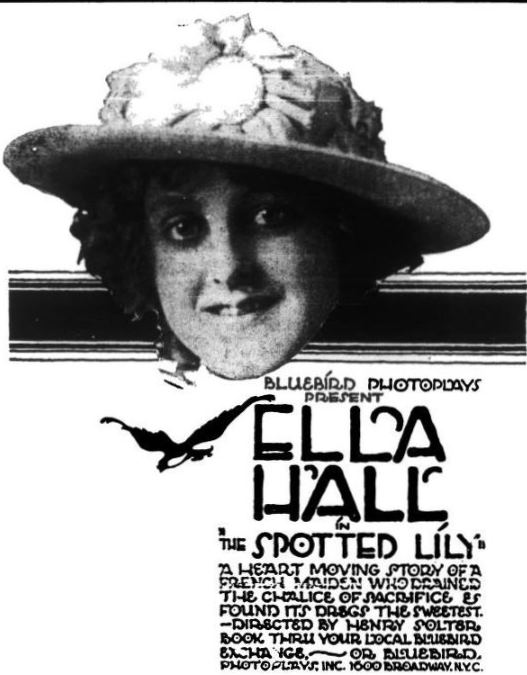
The Spotted Lily
Oct 1917

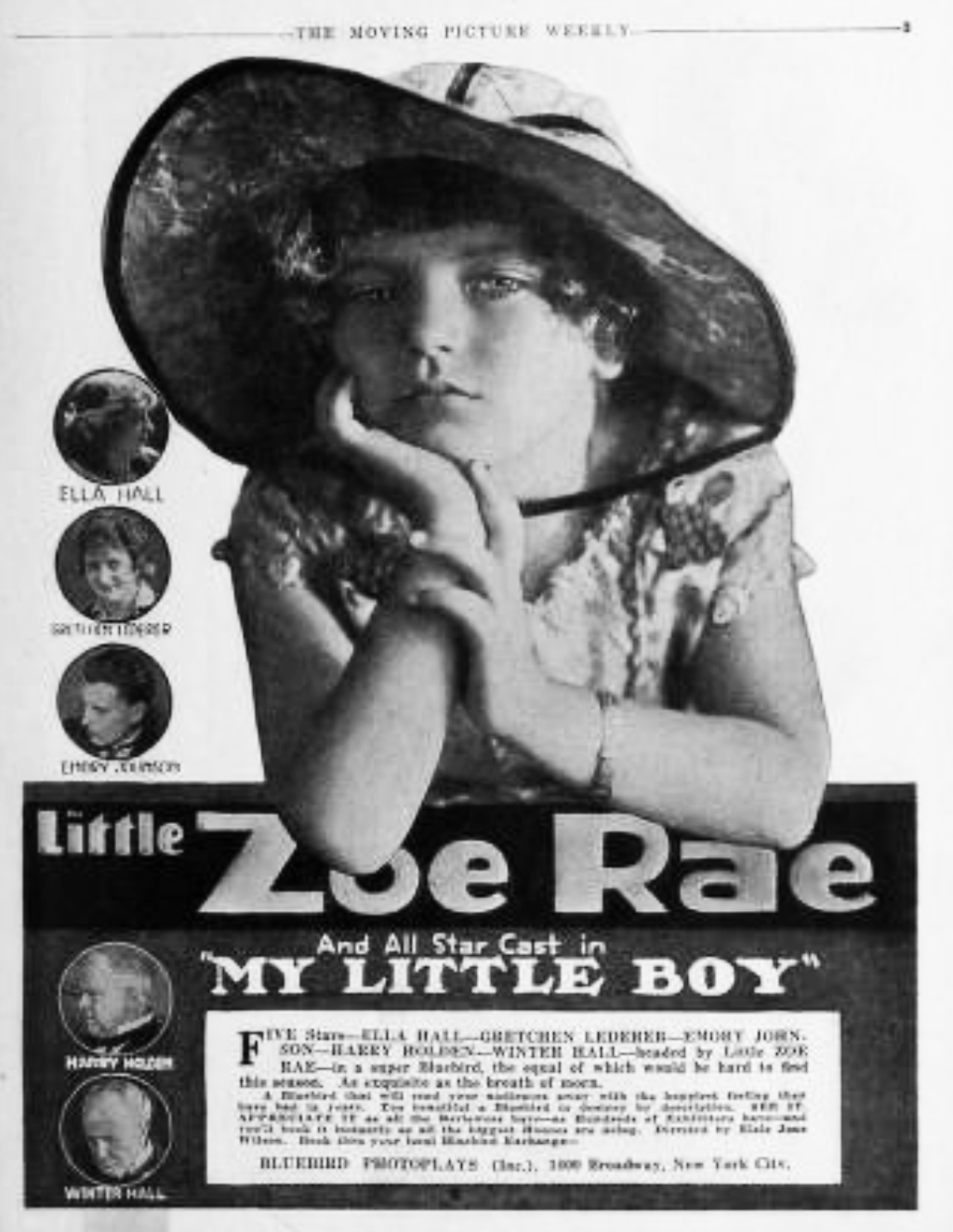
My Little Boy
Dec 1917

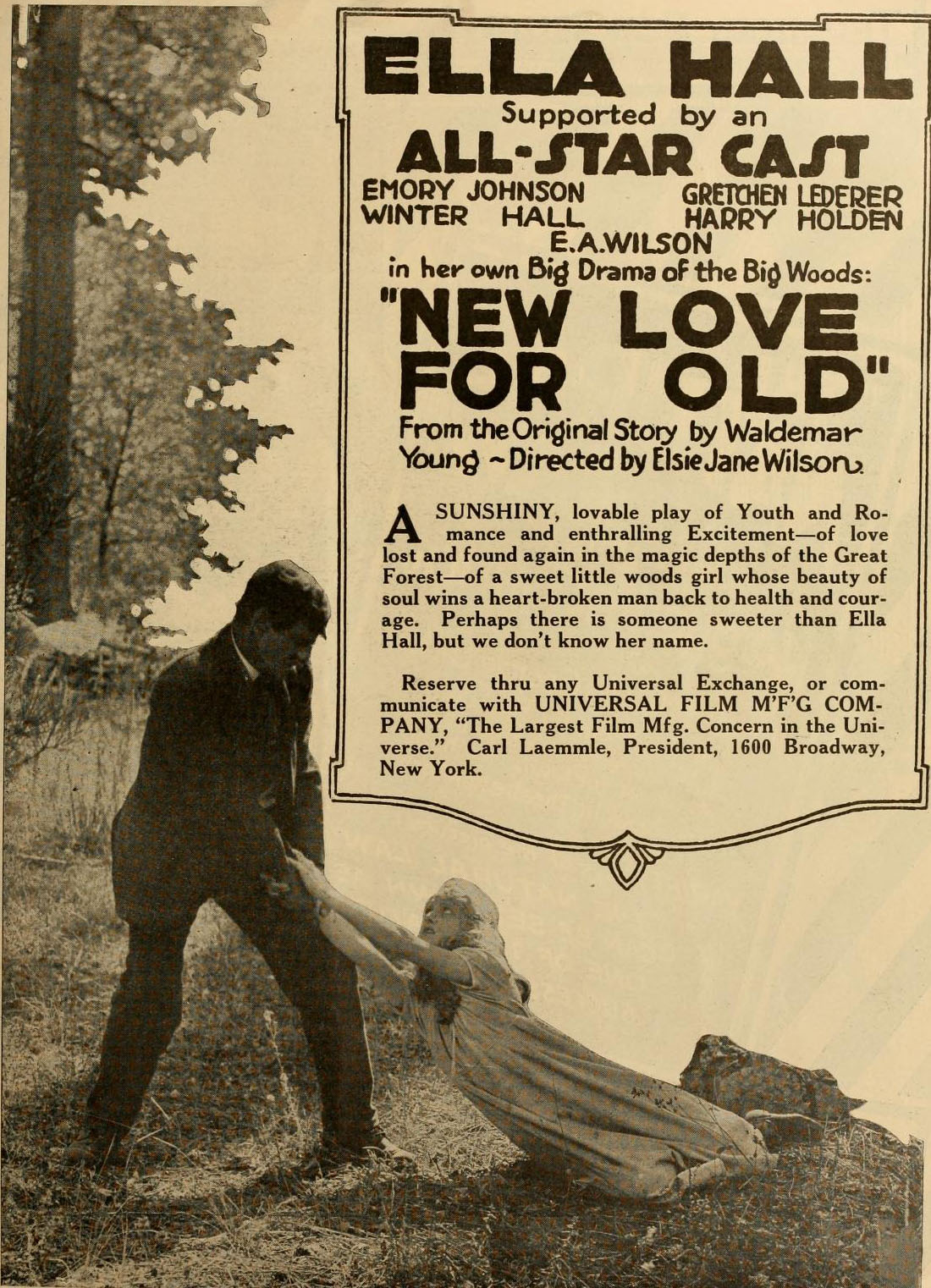
New Love for Old
Feb 1918

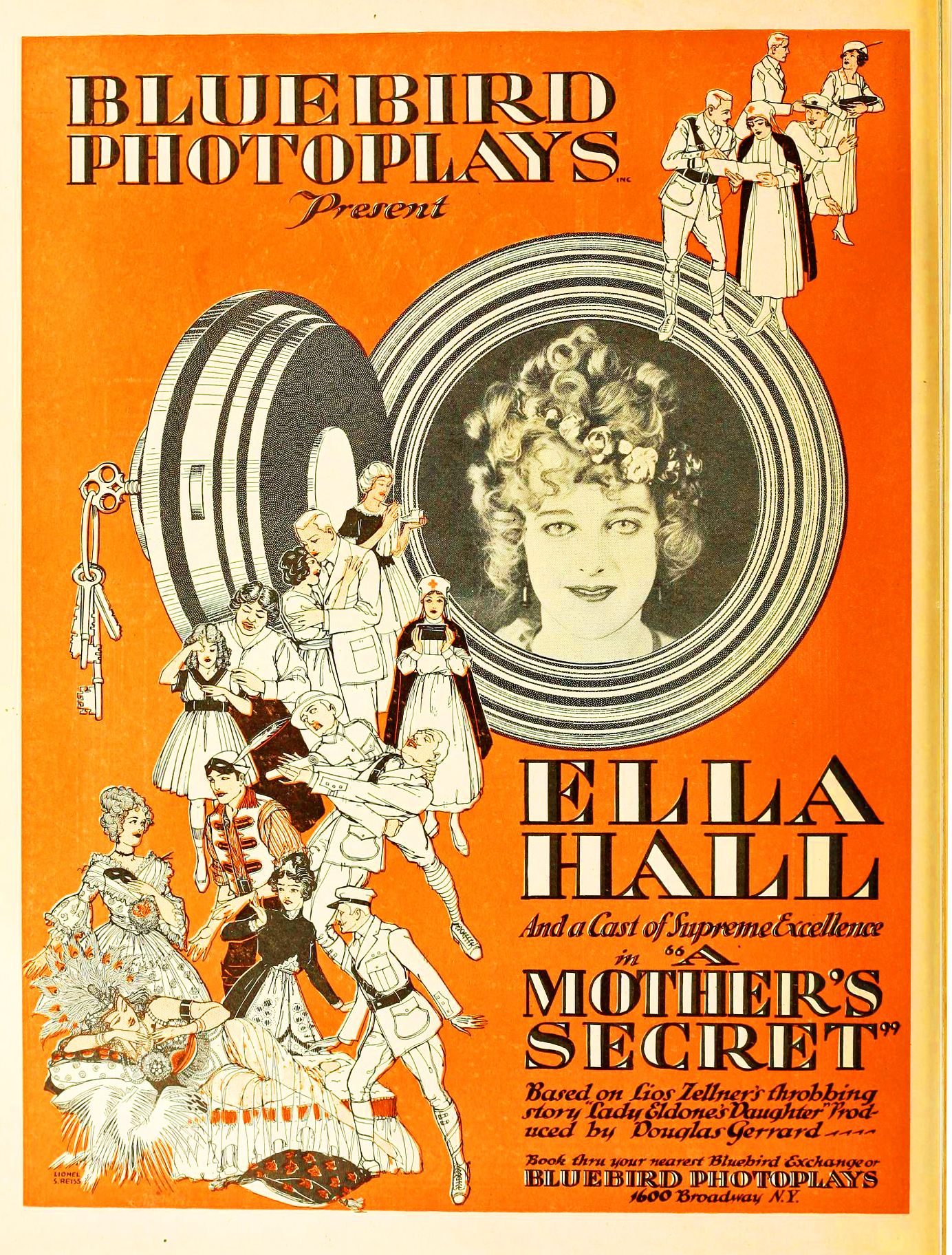
A Mother's Secret
Apr 1918

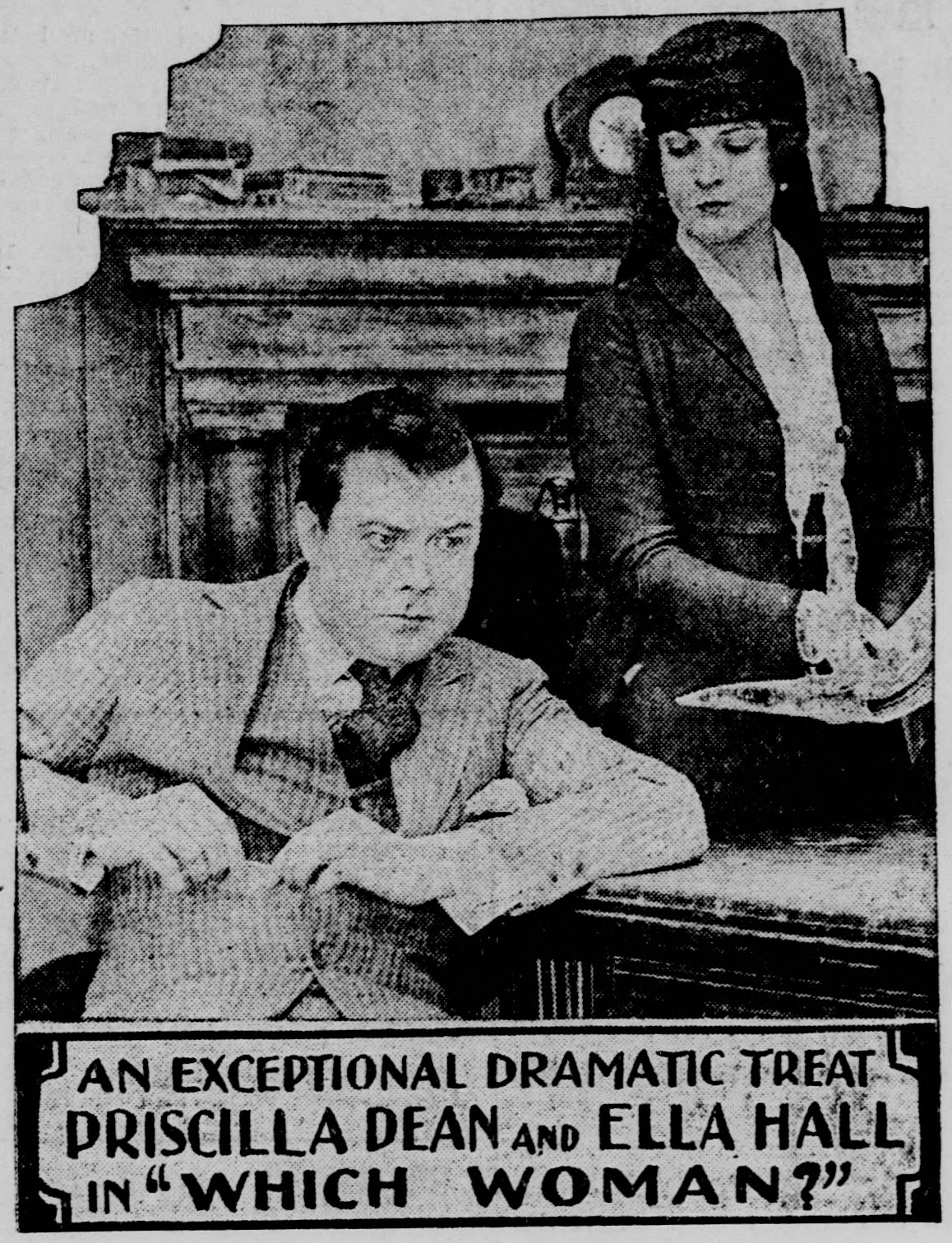
Which Woman?
Jun 1918

== Links to surviving films ==
- "Hot Stuff" on YouTube 1912
- "The School Teacher and the Waif" on YouTube 1912
- "The Third Alarm" on YouTube 1922
- The West~Bound Limited on YouTube 1923
- Madam Satan 1930
- Street Scene on YouTube 1931
- Taxi! on Dailymotion 1932
- Rasputin and the Empress 1932
- The Bitter Tea of General Yen on YouTube 1933

== Bibliography ==
- Braff, Richard E. (2002). The Braff silent short film working papers. Jefferson, NC: McFarland & Co. p. 696. ISBN 0-7864-1031-0. "over 25,000 films, 1903–1929, alphabetized and indexed"
- Braff, Richard E. (September 23, 2009). The Universal Silents: A Filmography of the Universal Motion Picture Manufacturing Company, 1912–1929. McFarland. ISBN 978-1-4766-0685-9.
- Braff, Richard E. (1999). The Universal Silents 1912–1929. Jefferson, North Carolina: McFarland & Company, Inc. p. 675. ISBN 0-7864-0287-3. "A filmography of the Universal Picture Manufacturing Company, 1912–1929"
- Goldrup, Jim and Tom (2012). The Encyclopedia of Feature Players of Hollywood. Vol. 1 (1st ed.). Duncan, Oklahoma: BearManor Media. p. 697. ISBN 978-1-59393-293-0.
- Hirschhorn, Clive (1983). The Universal Story (1st ed.). New York: Crown Publishers. p. 400. ISBN 0-517-55001-6. "The Complete History of the Studio and its 2,641 Films"
- Katchmer, G.A. (2015). A Biographical Dictionary of Silent Film Western Actors and Actresses. McFarland, Incorporated, Publishers. ISBN 978-1-4766-0905-8.
- Lowe, Denise (January 27, 2014). An Encyclopedic Dictionary of Women in Early American Films: 1895–1930. Routledge. ISBN 978-1-317-71896-3.
- Slide, A. (1996). Lois Weber: The Director who Lost Her Way in History. ABC-Clio ebook. Greenwood Press. ISBN 978-0-313-29945-2.
- Spehr, Paul C.; Lundquist, Gunnar (1996). American Film Personnel and Company Credits, 1908–1920: Filmographies Reordered by Authoritative Organizational and Personal Names from Lauritzen and Lundquist's American Film-index. McFarland, Incorporated. ISBN 978-0-7864-0255-7.
