= A Mother's Secret =

A Mother's Secret may refer to:

- A Mother's Secret (1918 film), an American silent drama film
- A Mother's Secret (1952 film), a French drama film
