= New Love for Old =

1918 American drama film directed by Elsie Jane Wilson

New Love For Old
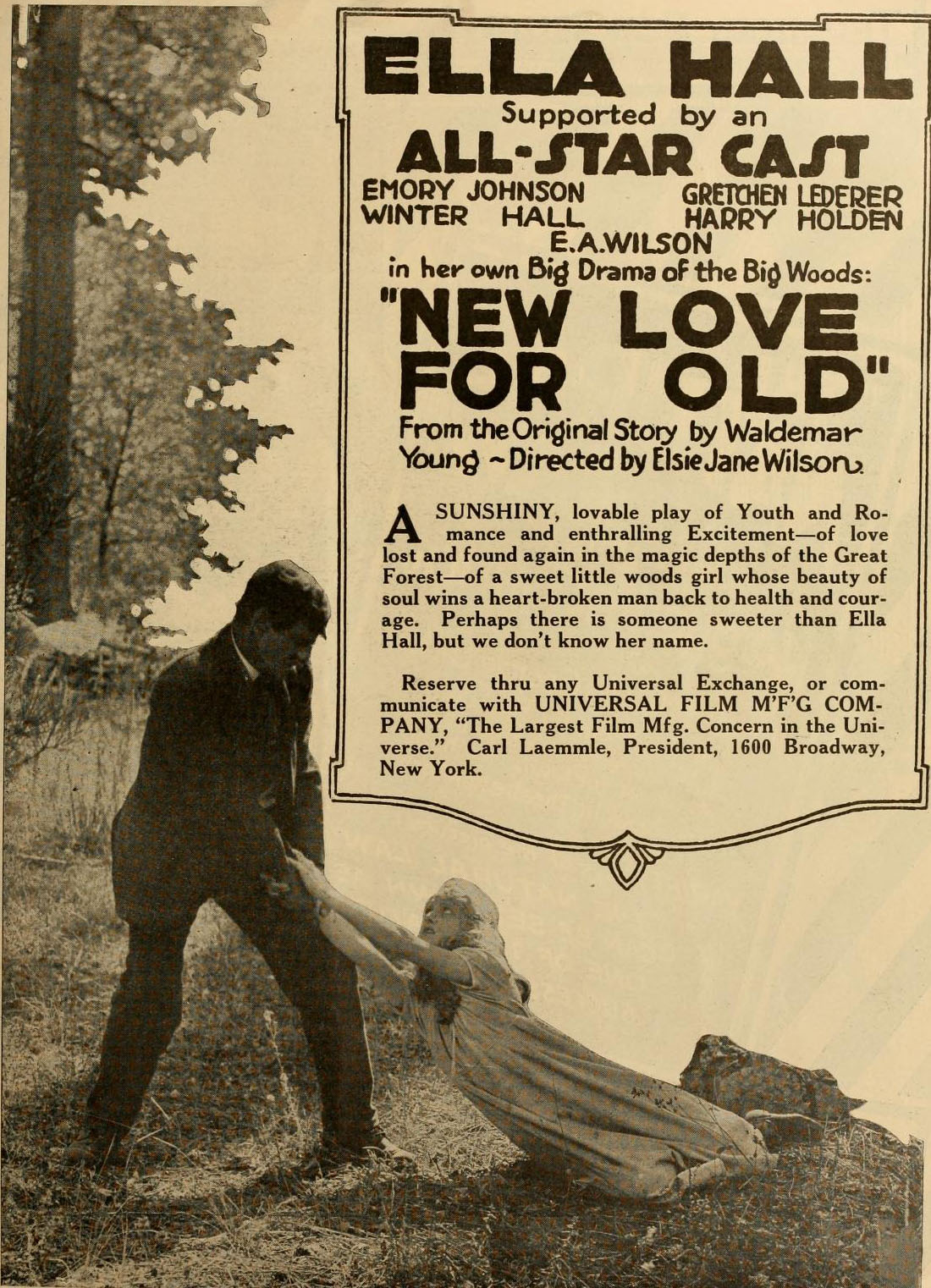
- Magazine advertisement
- Directed by: Elsie Jane Wilson
- Story by: Waldemar Young
- Produced by: Ella Hall Productions
- Starring: Ella Hall
- Cinematography: Alfred Gosden
- Distributed by: Universal
- Release date: February 1918
- Running time: 5 reels
- Country: United States
- Language: Silent (English intertitles)

New Love For Old is a 1918 American silent drama film directed by Elsie Jane Wilson from the story by Waldemar Young. The film stars Ella Hall, Winter Hall and Emory Johnson. The film was released on February 18, 1918, by Universal

== Cast ==
Actor	Role
Ella Hall	Daphne Sawyer
Winter Hall	Ben Sawyer
Gretchen Lederer	Marie Beauchamp
Emory Johnson	Kenneth Scott
E. Alyn Warren	Louis Bracchi
Harry Holden	'Doc' Podden
