= The Spotted Lily =

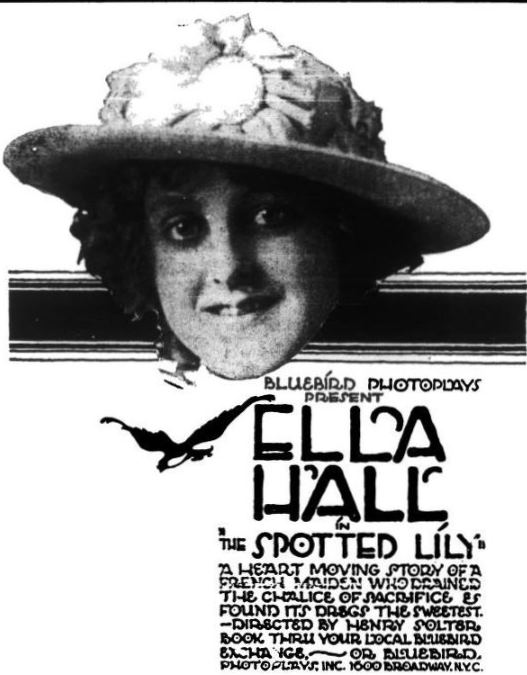
- Directed by: Harry Solter
- Written by: J. Grubb Alexander; Fred Myton
- Starring: Ella Hall; Jack Nelson; George Beranger
- Cinematography: Walter L. Griffin
- Production company: Universal Pictures
- Distributed by: Universal Pictures
- Release date: October 1, 1917
- Running time: 50 minutes
- Country: United States
- Languages: Silent; English intertitles

The Spotted Lily is a 1917 American silent drama film directed by Harry Solter and starring Ella Hall, Jack Nelson and George Beranger. Prints and/or fragments were found in the Dawson Film Find in 1978.

== Cast ==
- Ella Hall as Yvonne
- Jack Nelson as Pere Anatole
- George Beranger as Captain Franz
- Victor Rodman as Jean
- Gretchen Lederer as Sonia Maroff
- Charles Hill Mailes as Pere Anatole later
- Wilton Taylor as Angus Leeds
- Leon De La Mothe as Tony Cassati

== Bibliography ==
- Paul C. Spehr & Gunnar Lundquist. American Film Personnel and Company Credits, 1908-1920. McFarland, 1996.
