= The Crippled Hand =

1916 silent film

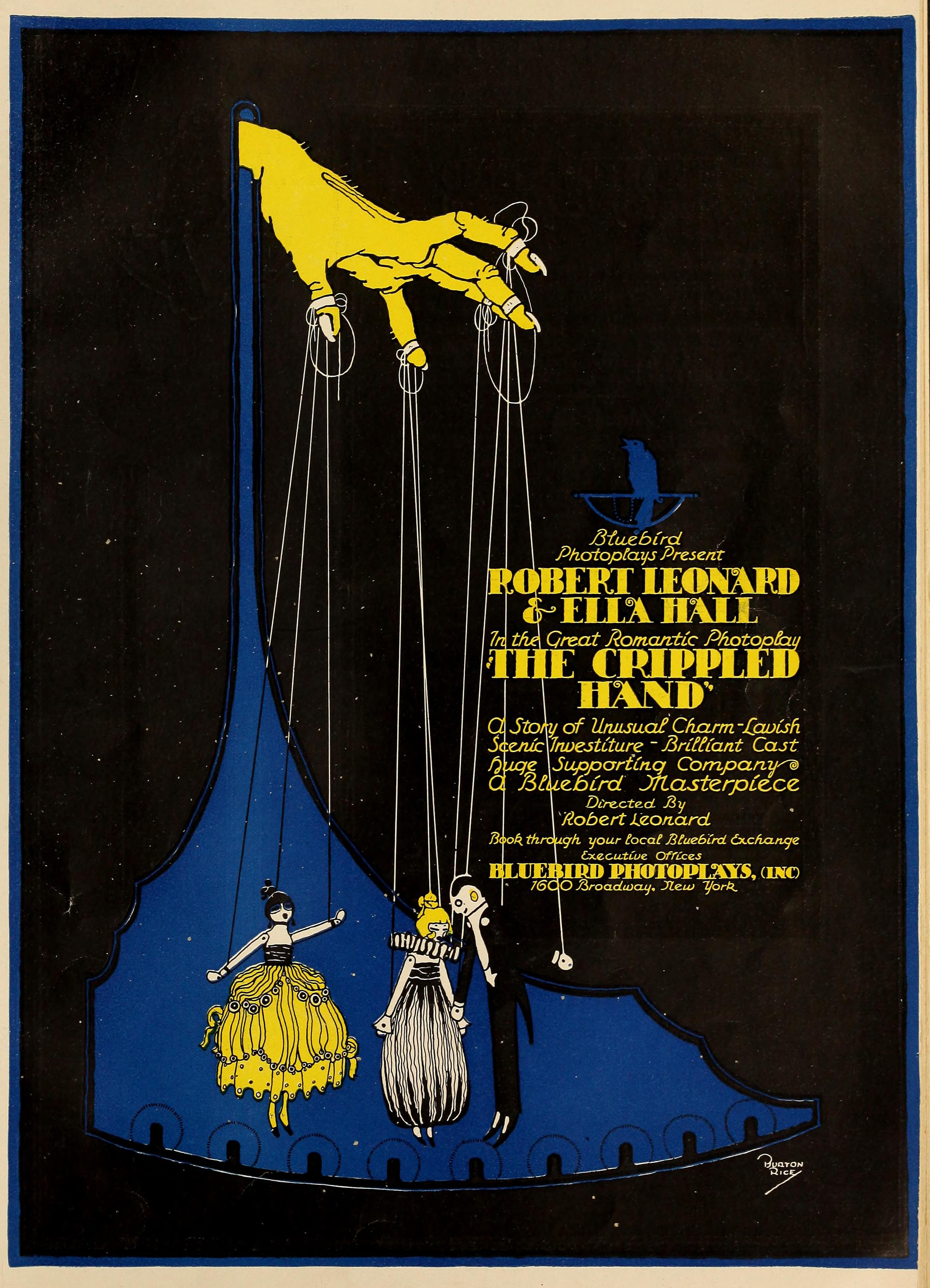
- Directed by: David Kirkland; Robert Z. Leonard
- Written by: Calder Johnstone; Robert Z. Leonard
- Starring: Robert Z. Leonard; Gladys Brockwell; Marc B. Robbins
- Cinematography: R.E. Irish
- Production company: Universal Pictures
- Distributed by: Universal Pictures
- Release date: May 1, 1916
- Running time: 50 minutes
- Country: United States
- Languages: Silent; English intertitles

The Crippled Hand is a 1916 American silent drama film directed by David Kirkland and Robert Z. Leonard and starring Leonard, Gladys Brockwell and Marc B. Robbins.

== Cast ==
- Robert Z. Leonard as The Rich Man
- Ella Hall as The Little Girl
- Marc B. Robbins as The Manager
- Gladys Brockwell as The Prima Donna
- Kingsley Benedict as The Cripple

== Bibliography ==
- Slide, Anthony. Silent Players: A Biographical and Autobiographical Study of 100 Silent Film Actors and Actresses. University Press of Kentucky, 2002.
