= The Career of Waterloo Peterson =

1914 American comedy film directed by Phillips Smalley and Lois Weber

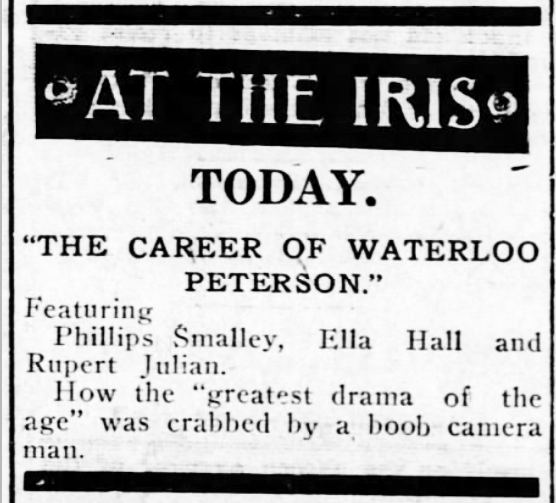
- Newspaper ad for movie
- Directed by: Phillips Smalley; Lois Weber
- Written by: Lois Weber
- Produced by: Rex
- Starring: Rupert Julian; Ella Hall
- Cinematography: Lawrence Dallin Clawson
- Production company: Universal Studios
- Distributed by: Universal
- Release date: May 10, 1914
- Running time: 6 minutes; 500 feet; Split reel
- Country: United States
- Language: Silent (English intertitles)

The Career of Waterloo Peterson is a 1914 American short comedy film. Phillips Smalley and Lois Weber directed this silent motion picture. The film features Rupert Julian as Waterloo Peterson and Ella Hall as herself. The film was produced by Rex Motion Picture Company, distributed by Universal Pictures and released in the United States on May 10, 1914.

American Film Institute also noted, "Picture is record breaker, made in four and one-half hours."

== Cast ==
Actor	Role
Rupert Julian	Waterloo Peterson
Ella Hall	Herself, Actress
Agnes Gordon	Herself, Actress
Richard Rosson	Himself, Actor
Isadore Bernstein	Himself, Writer
William Foster	Himself, Director
Dal Clawson	Himself, Cameraman

== Preservation ==
The preservation status of this film is not known.
