= The Bugler of Algiers =

1916 drama film by Rupert Julian

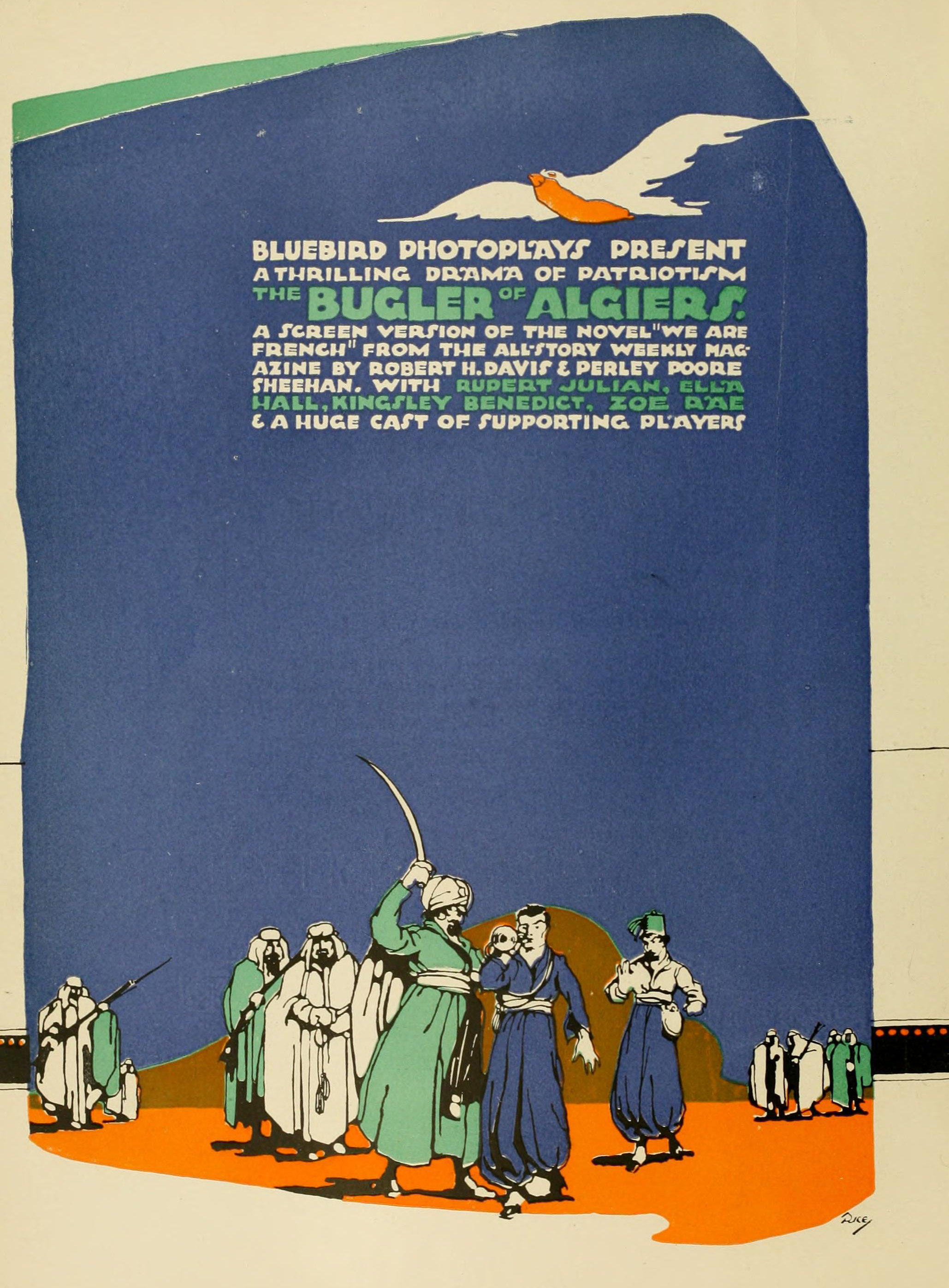
- Directed by: Rupert Julian
- Written by: Elliott J. Clawson
- Produced by: Bluebird Photoplays
- Starring: Rupert Julian; Ella Hall
- Cinematography: Stephen Rounds
- Distributed by: Universal Film Manufacturing Company
- Release date: November 27, 1916
- Running time: 50minutes
- Country: United States
- Language: Silent..English titles

The Bugler of Algiers is a lost 1916 American silent film drama directed by Rupert Julian. It was produced by Universal's Bluebird Photoplays division and distributed by Universal Film Manufacturing Company.

== Cast ==
- Ella Hall - Gabrielle
- Kingsley Benedict - Anatole Picard
- Rupert Julian - Pierre

unbilled

- Harry Carter - Unknown role
- Charles K. French - Unknown role
- Florence Noar - Unknown role
- Zoe Rae - unknown role
