= The Love Girl =

1916 silent film

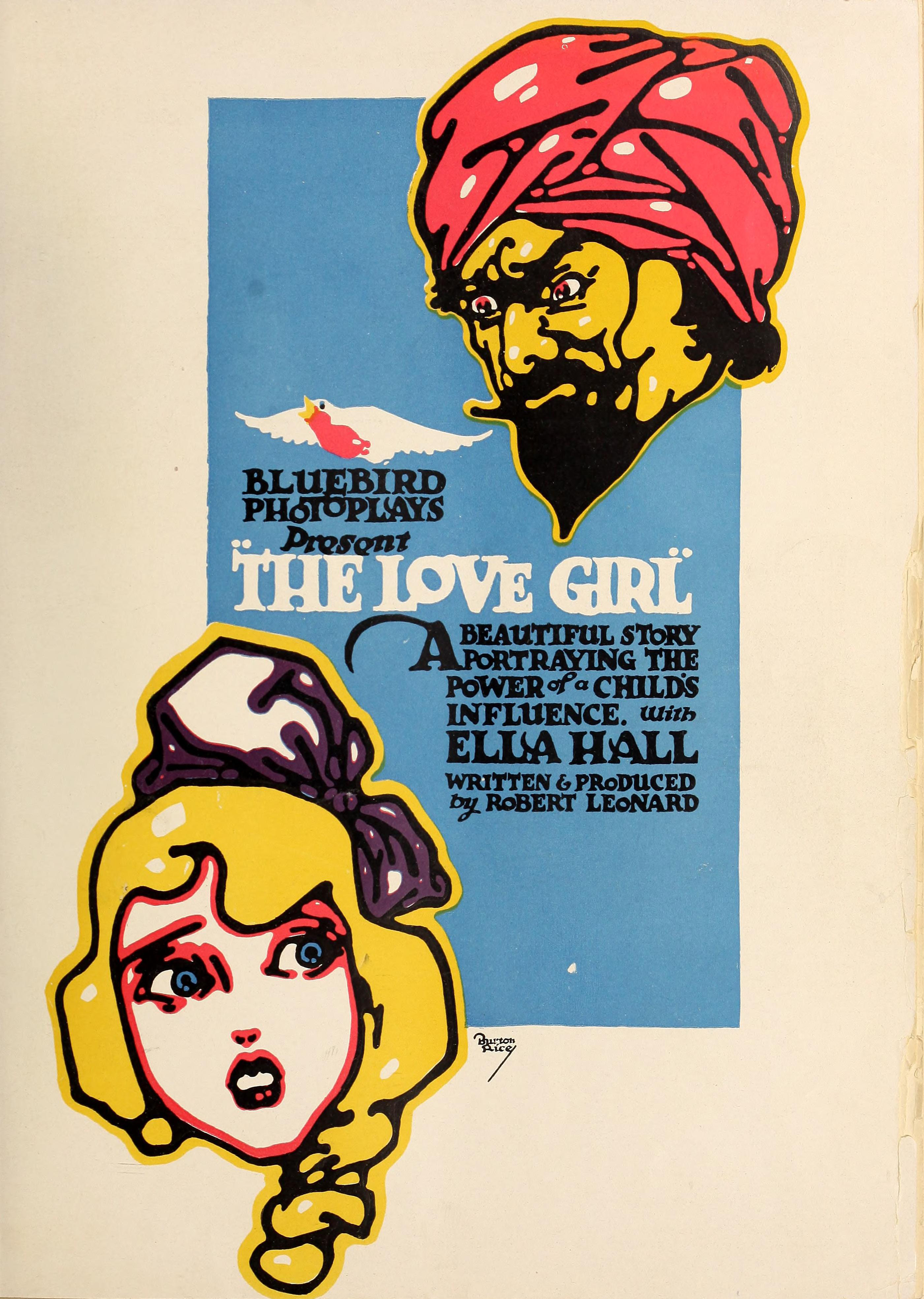
- Directed by: Robert Z. Leonard
- Written by: Robert Z. Leonard
- Starring: Ella Hall; Adele Farrington; Kingsley Benedict
- Production company: Universal Pictures
- Distributed by: Universal Pictures
- Release date: July 10, 1916
- Running time: 50 minutes
- Country: United States
- Languages: Silent; English intertitles

The Love Girl is a 1916 American silent comedy film directed by Robert Z. Leonard and starring Ella Hall, Adele Farrington and Kingsley Benedict. A print of The Love Girl exists in the UCLA Film & Television Archive.

== Cast ==
- Ella Hall as Ambrosia
- Adele Farrington as Ambrosia's Aunt Betty
- Kingsley Benedict as Betty's Sweetheart
- Betty Schade as Ambrosia's Cousin
- Harry Depp as The Boy Next Door
- Grace Marvin as The Maid
- Wadsworth Harris as The Swami

== Bibliography ==
- Langman, Larry. American Film Cycles: The Silent Era. Greenwood Publishing, 1998.
