= Her Soul's Inspiration =

1917 American silent drama film

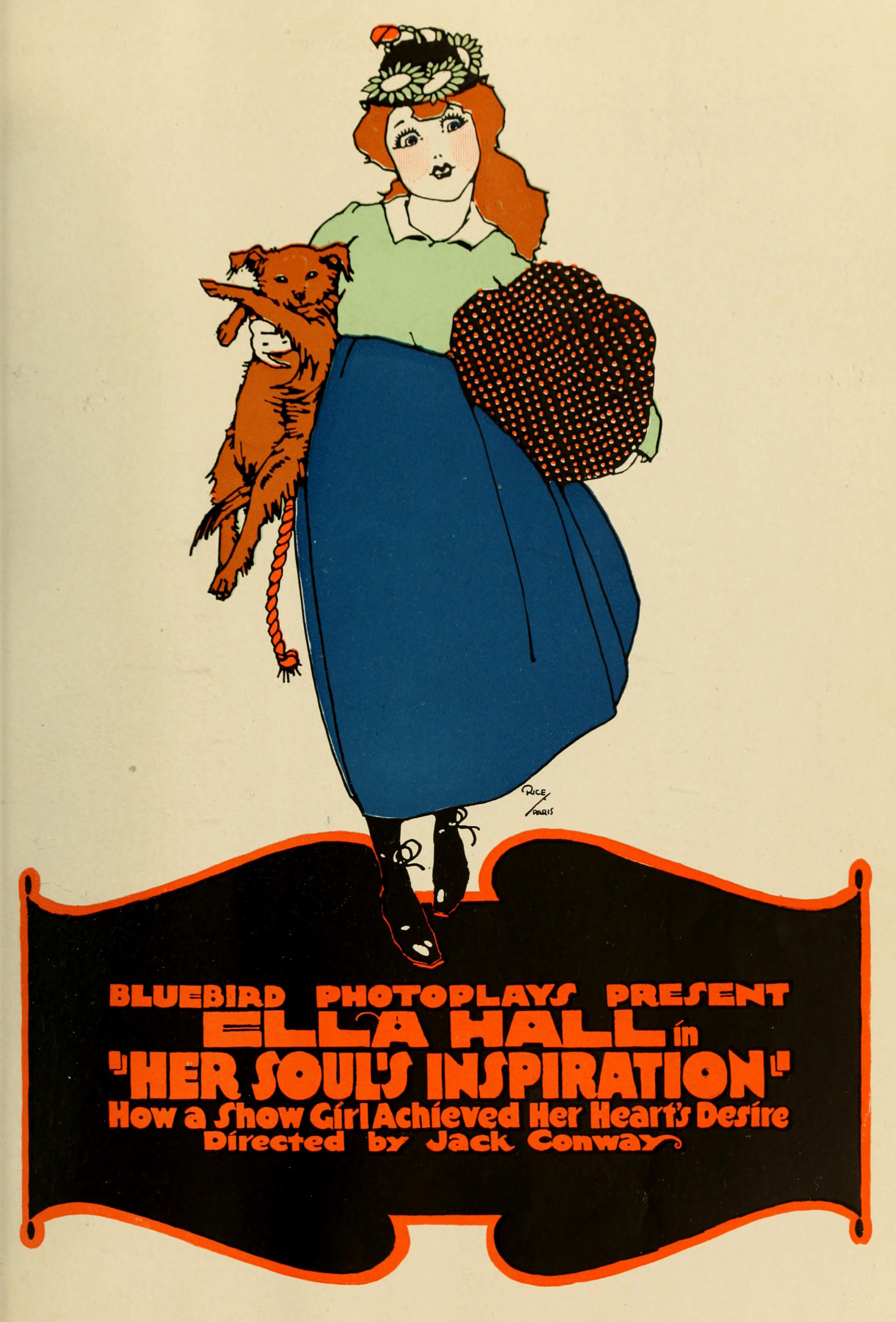
- How a Show Girl Achieved Her Heart's Desire
- Directed by: Jack Conway
- Written by: Harris Anson (story); Maie B. Havey
- Starring: Ella Hall; Marc B. Robbins; Dick Ryan
- Cinematography: Edward A. Kull
- Production company: Universal Pictures
- Distributed by: Universal Pictures
- Release date: January 15, 1917
- Running time: 5 reels
- Country: United States
- Languages: Silent; English intertitles

Her Soul's Inspiration is a 1917 American silent drama film directed by Jack Conway and starring Ella Hall, Marc B. Robbins and Dick Ryan.

== Synopsis ==
The heroine Mary Weston seems to have been born with music in her feet. She is always dancing, and in virtue of a promise made to her dying mother, her father sells his farm and invests the proceeds in a traveling show, so that Mary may realize her ambition. However, her father dies and Mary was robbed of her inheritance by Madame Le Rue, a member of the company. Mary, who had her father's confidence, enters upon a career of vicissitudes and penury, in which two men, Silent Bob and Phillip Carstairs, help to shape her character, until the time arrives when the usurper is brought to book, and Mary comes into her own.

== Cast ==
- Ella Hall as Mary Weston
- Marc B. Robbins as Daddy Weston
- Dick Ryan as Philip Carstairs
- Edward Hearn as Silent Bob
- Marcia Moore as Zella
- Margaret Whistler as Madame La Rue

== Preservation ==
Three of the five reels were found in the Dawson Film Find in 1978, and are currently held by Library and Archives Canada.

== Bibliography ==
- James Robert Parish & Michael R. Pitts. Film directors: a guide to their American films. Scarecrow Press, 1974.
