= The Silent Command (1915 film) =

1915 American drama film directed by Robert Z. Leonard

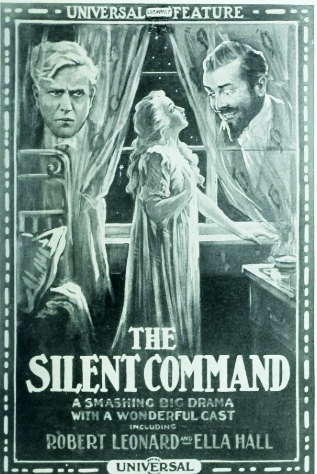
- Magazine ad for movie
- Directed by: Robert Z. Leonard
- Written by: Robert Z. Leonard
- Produced by: Carl Laemmle
- Starring: Robert Z. Leonard; Ella Hall
- Cinematography: Stephen S. Norton
- Production company: Universal Studios
- Distributed by: Universal
- Release date: June 2, 1915
- Running time: 50 minutes; 4 reels
- Country: United States
- Language: Silent (English intertitles)

The Silent Command is a 1915 American silent mystery feature film. Robert Z. Leonard wrote, starred in, and directed this movie. The film also features Ella Hall.

The film was produced by Carl Laemmle, distributed by Universal and released in the United States on June 2, 1915.

== Cast ==
Actor	Role
Robert Z. Leonard	Father
Ella Hall	Daughter
Harry Carter	Dr. Sevani
Allan Forrest	Lawyer and Ella's Sweetheart
Mark Fenton	The Coroner

== Home Media ==
According to one source, this film is available on DVD while other sources state the film is lost.

== Preservation ==
According to the Library of Congress, all known copies of this film are lost.

The National Film Preservation Board (NFPB) included this film on its list of Lost U.S. Silent Feature Films as of February 2021.

Players
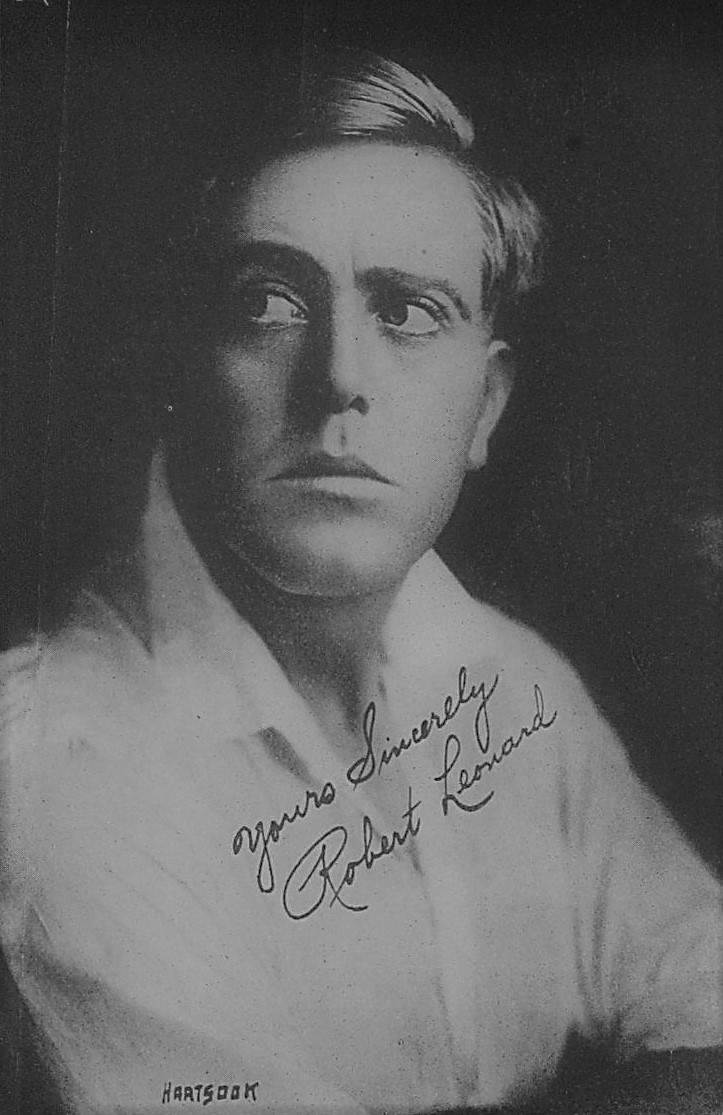
Robert Z. Leonard
Father

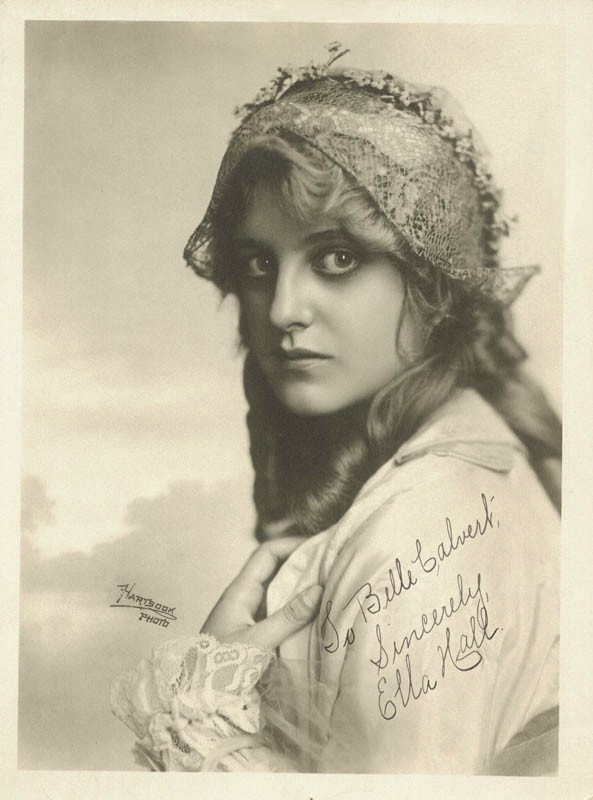
Ella Hall
Daughter

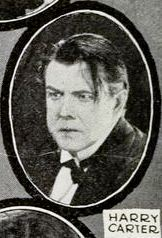
Harry Carter
Dr. Sevani

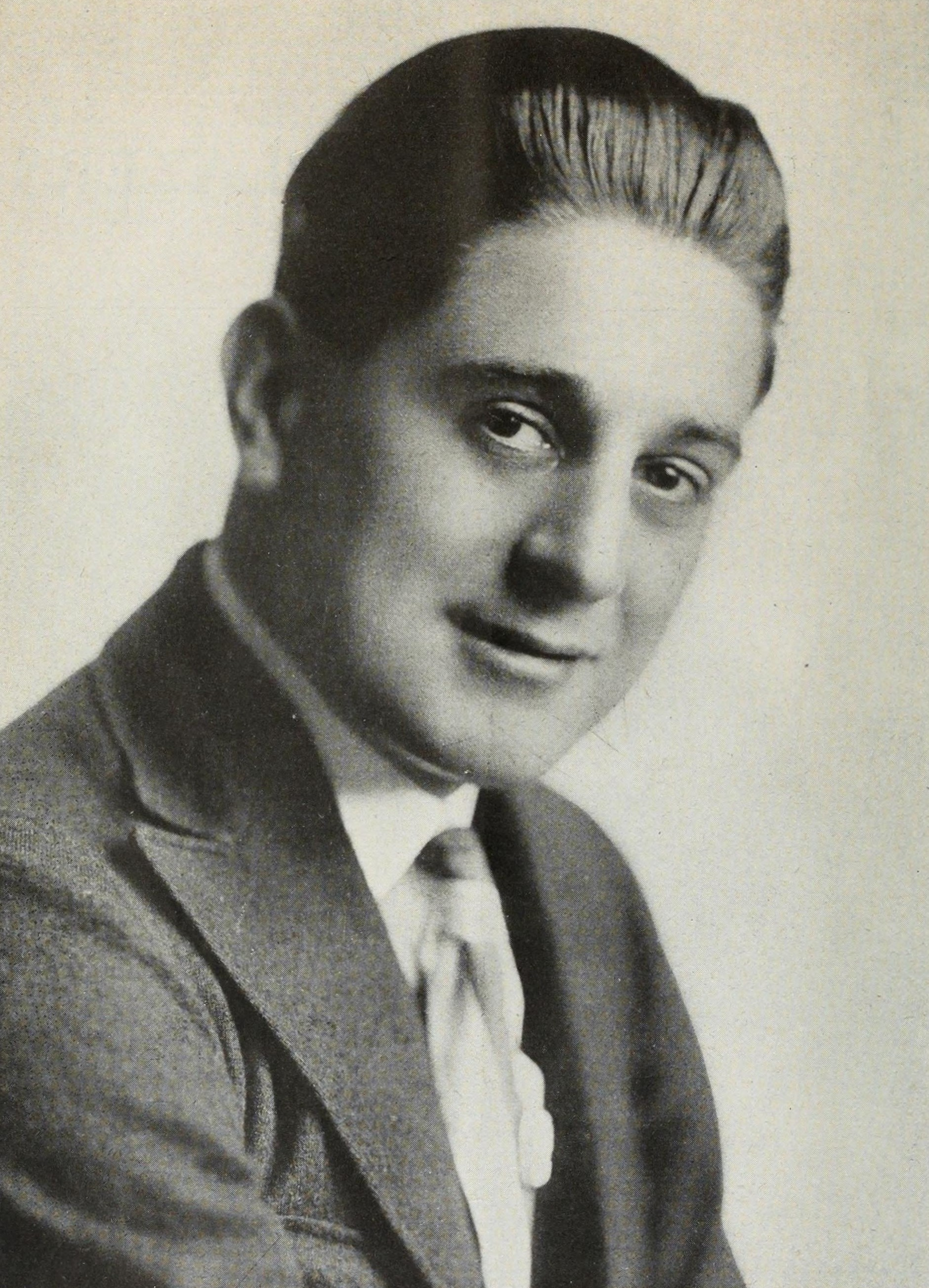
Allan Forrest
Lawyer and Ella's Sweetheart

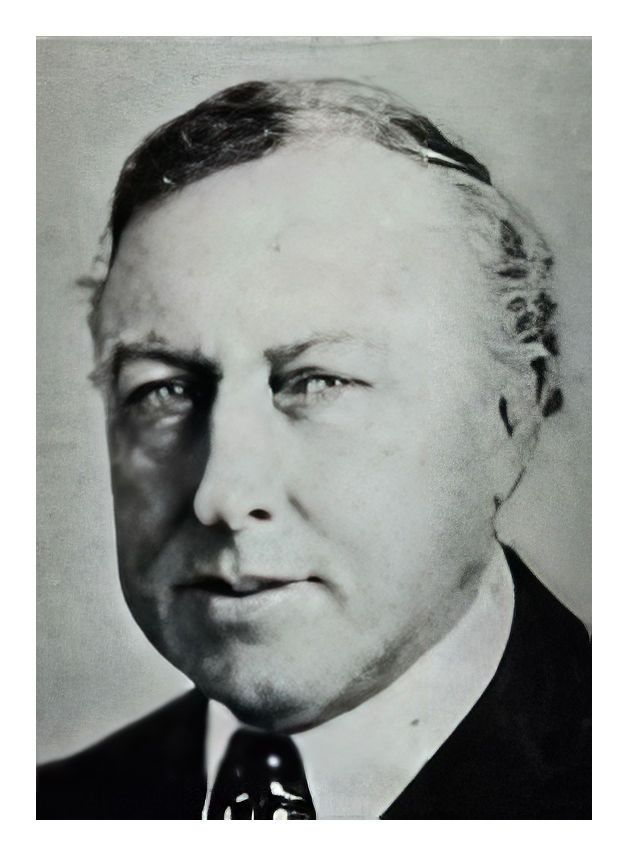
Mark Fenton
The Coroner

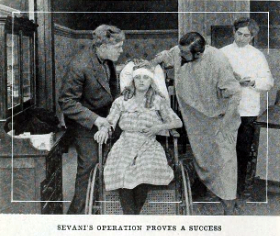
Movie still
