= The Flying Dutchman (1923 film) =

1923 film

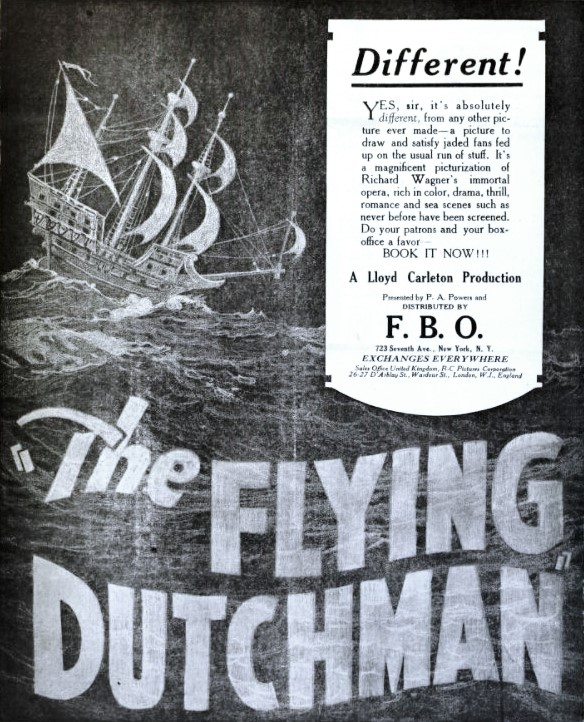
- Directed by: Lloyd B. Carleton
- Starring: Lawson Butt; Nola Luxford; Ella Hall
- Cinematography: André Barlatier
- Production company: Robertson-Cole Pictures Corporation
- Distributed by: Film Booking Offices of America
- Release date: July 29, 1923
- Running time: 60 minutes
- Country: United States
- Languages: Silent; English intertitles

The Flying Dutchman is a 1923 American silent drama film directed by Lloyd B. Carleton and starring Lawson Butt, Nola Luxford and Ella Hall. It is inspired by the legend of The Flying Dutchman.

== Cast ==
- Lawson Butt as Philip Vanderdecker
- Nola Luxford as Melissa
- Ella Hall as Zoe
- Edward Coxen as Robert
- Walter Law as Peter Van Dorn

== Bibliography ==
- Munden, Kenneth White. The American Film Institute Catalog of Motion Pictures Produced in the United States, Part 1. University of California Press, 1997.
