= At the Foot of the Stairs =

1914 American drama film directed by Otis Turner

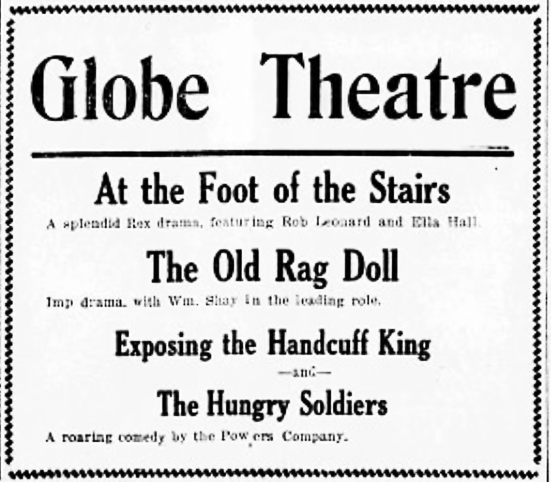
- Magazine ad for movie
- Directed by: Otis Turner
- Produced by: Rex
- Starring: Robert Z. Leonard; Ella Hall
- Production company: Universal Studios
- Distributed by: Universal
- Release date: July 23, 1914
- Running time: 11 minutes; 1 reels
- Country: United States
- Language: Silent (English intertitles)

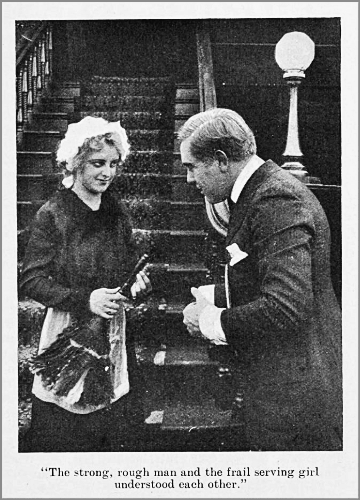
Still from the movie - At the Foot of the Stairs

At The Foot of the Stairs is a 1914 American silent short drama film. Otis Turner directed this silent motion picture. The film features Robert Z. Leonard as the betrayed husband and Ella Hall as the new maid. The film was produced by Rex Motion Picture Company, distributed by Universal Pictures and released in the United States on July 23, 1914.

== Cast ==
Actor	Role
Robert Z. Leonard	Betrayed Husband
Ella Hall	Maid
Allan Forrest	Friend
Jim Mason	Stool Pigeon
Bruce M. Mitchell	Detective
Harry Carter	Crook
Lloyd Ingraham	Crook
Flora Garcia	The Wife

== Preservation ==
The film's current preservation status is unknown.
