= A Mother's Secret (1918 film) =

1918 American drama film directed by Douglas Gerrard

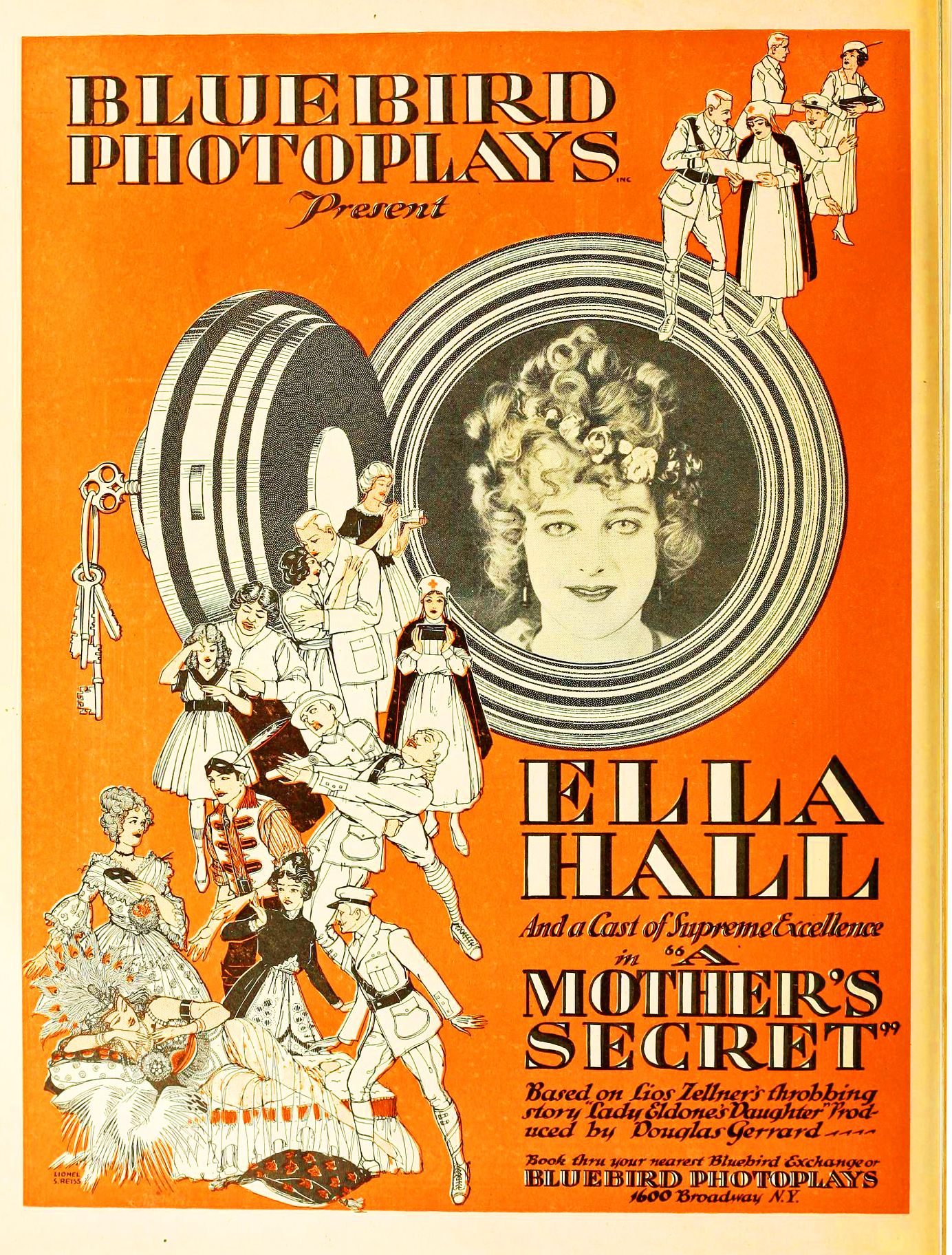
- Magazine Ad
- Directed by: Douglas Gerrard
- Written by: Doris Schroeder (scenario); Lois Zellner (story)
- Produced by: Universal
- Starring: Ella Hall
- Cinematography: Alfred Gosden
- Distributed by: Universal
- Release date: April 1918
- Running time: 5 reels
- Country: United States
- Language: Silent (English intertitles

A Mother's Secret is a 1918 American silent drama film directed by Douglas Gerrard and written by Lois Zellner. The film stars Ella Hall and Emory Johnson. The film was released on April 29, 1918, by Universal.

== Cast ==
Actor	Role
Ella Hall	Angela
Mary Mersch	Lady Eldone
T.D. Crittenden	Captain Eldone
Emory Johnson	Howard Grey
Mrs. L.C. Harris	Mammy
Grace McLean	Rose Marie

== Preservation Status ==
According to the Library of Congress website, no known copies of this movie survive.
