= Kingsley Benedict =

American actor (1878–1951)

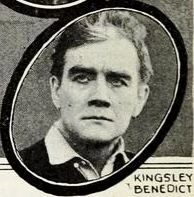
- Benedict in ad for The Kentucky Derby (1922)
- Born: November 14, 1878; Buffalo, New York
- Died: November 27, 1951 (aged 73); Woodland Hills, Los Angeles
- Occupation: Actor
- Years active: 1915-1930

Kingsley Benedict (November 14, 1878 – November 27, 1951) was an American actor of the silent era. He appeared in more than 50 films between 1915 and 1930. He was born in Buffalo, New York, and died in Woodland Hills, Los Angeles.

Benedict acted on stage for 17 years before he began acting on films. On Broadway, Benedict appeared in How Baxter Butted In (1905).

== Selected filmography ==
- Judge Not; or The Woman of Mona Diggings (1915)
- Christmas Memories (1915)
- The Bugler of Algiers (1916)
- The Crippled Hand (1916)
- The Love Girl (1916)
- The Voice on the Wire (1917)
- The Plow Woman (1917)
- The Mystery Ship (1917)
- Man and Beast (1917)
- The Secret of the Hills (1921)
- Gay and Devilish (1922)
- The Kentucky Derby (1922)
- A Man of Action (1923)
- Riders of the Plains (1924)
- White Thunder (1925)
- The Arizona Sweepstakes (1926)
- Fast and Furious (1927)
- Terry of the Times (1930)
