= The Heart of Lincoln =

1915 silent film

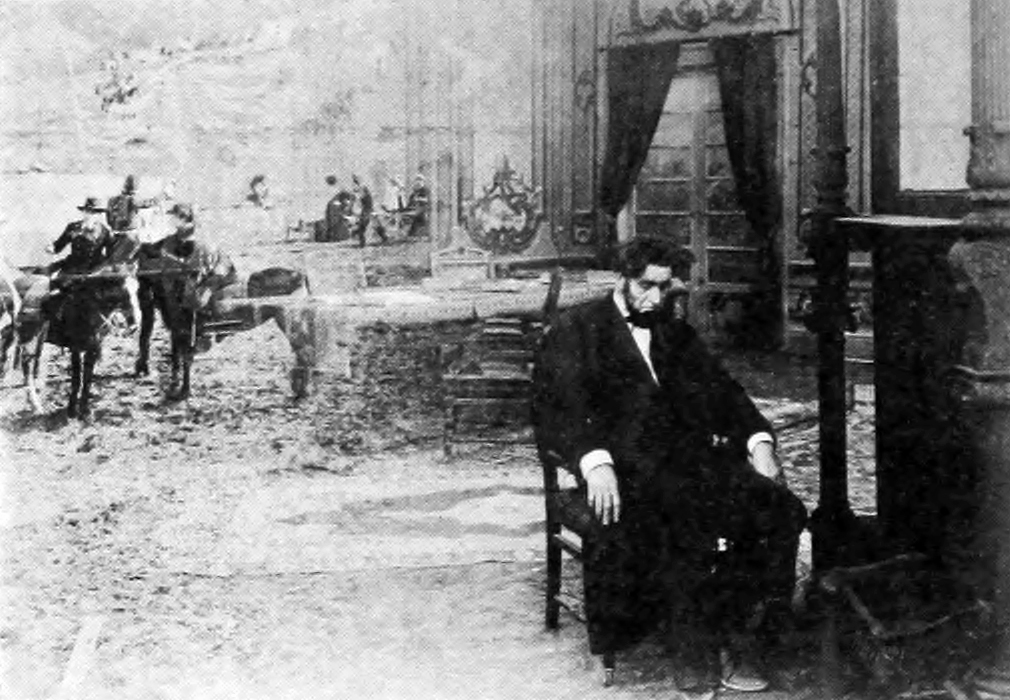
- Still from the 1915 version
- Directed by: Francis Ford
- Written by: Grace Cunard (scenario)
- Produced by: Francis Ford
- Starring: Francis Ford; Grace Cunard; William Quinn
- Production companies: 1915: Universal Film Manufacturing Company; 1922: Fordart Films
- Distributed by: Universal Film Manufacturing Company
- Release dates: February 9, 1915; November 1, 1922
- Running time: 1915: 30 minutes (3 reels); 1922: 60 minutes (5 reels)
- Country: United States
- Languages: Silent film (English intertitles)

The Heart of Lincoln is the name of both a 1915 and 1922 silent film directed, produced by and starring Francis Ford and featuring Grace Cunard. The film was released by Universal Film Manufacturing Company on February 9, 1915. Ford later remade the film, completely re-shooting it and adding a prologue; it was released November 1, 1922.

The 1922 version was a lost film until a 16mm print was found at a film archive on Long Island in 2024.

== Background ==
Francis Ford played Abraham Lincoln nine times in the silent films he directed; he loved to impersonate Lincoln. In 1915 he wrote the script for, directed, and starred in The Heart of Lincoln, a 3-reel 30-minute film. In 1917, Ford quit Universal Pictures and started his own studio Fordart Films, and returned to the plot of his 1915 film. He completely reshot it into a 5-reel 60-minute film.

== Plot ==
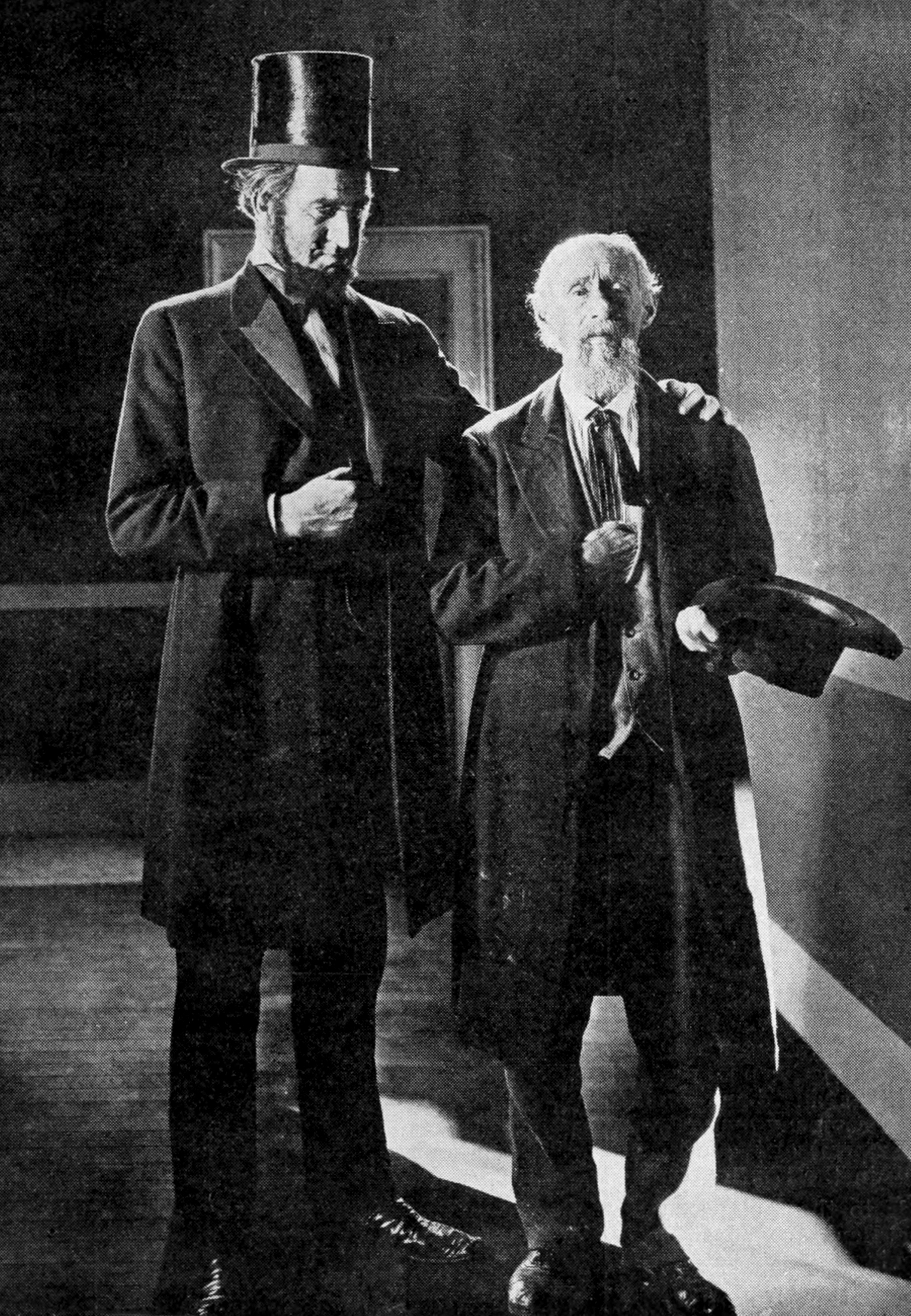
During production of the 1922 version, Francis Ford was photographed with John Dean, a man who had voted for Lincoln.

Set just before the American Civil War, the film tells the story of Betty, a young woman and an admirer of Abraham Lincoln, whose two friends, a Northern and a Southern colonel, debate Lincoln's merits.

During a gathering at Betty's home, Lincoln is present, and she gifts him hand-knitted socks. The war breaks out, dividing the two colonels. When the Southern colonel's mother falls ill, Betty gets word to him, and he returns home. The Northern colonel, seeing his friend, reports his presence but not his identity. Another soldier reports the Northern colonel's inaction, and both are arrested.

The Southerner is condemned to death, and the Northerner awaits charges. Betty's letter to Lincoln, pleading for their lives, is intercepted by his secretary. Despondent, Betty encounters Lincoln while helping his son with his goats. She explains her plight, but he says he cannot help. Mysteriously, the Southerner escapes prison the night before his execution. The Northerner is later released thanks to Lincoln. Both men, in their respective locations, are left to ponder Lincoln's compassion.

== Reception ==
=== 1915 version ===
"A three-reel production, written by Grace Cunard, who plays the part of Betty. Francis Ford appears as Lincoln. It is difficult to find new subject matter for fiction or the screen connected with the life of Lincoln. The character itself is appealing and Francis Ford has handled it in quite a pleasing way. The make-ups are rather too apparent in some of the cabinet members, but the general atmosphere of the piece is convincing. The plot itself is not overly strong, but brings out a number of pleasing scenes. Cabinet meetings, battle scenes and the manner in which Betty saves Jason from death are well depicted. This makes a fairly strong production." - The Moving Picture World, February 13, 1915.

=== 1922 version ===
The 1922 version played for only a day at various movie theaters, and was seen by very few people.

== Rediscovery and exhibition ==
The 1922 version was a lost film, one of more than 7,000 silent films considered lost by the Library of Congress. In August 2024, a copy was found by an intern at Historic Films Archive, a stock-footage library on Long Island, in a "dark, concrete basement". It had been donated to the HFA along with 10,000 other films by a Midwest educational institution which had shown the films in classrooms. Evidence that the film is the 1922 version is the presence of Ford's son Philip as a young soldier, who would not have been in California when the 1915 version was made. The film was cleaned and digitized and prepared for public display.
