= The Kaiser, the Beast of Berlin =

1918 film

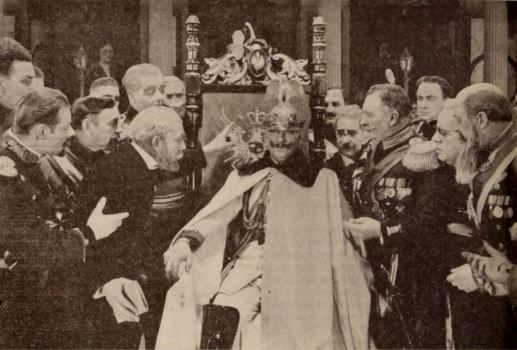
- Still of the Kaiser in the "scrap of paper" scene
- Directed by: Rupert Julian
- Written by: Rupert Julian; Elliott J. Clawson
- Produced by: Rupert Julian
- Starring: Rupert Julian; Elmo Lincoln; Nigel De Brulier; Lon Chaney; Harry von Meter
- Cinematography: Edward A. Kull
- Production company: Renowned Pictures Corporation
- Distributed by: Universal Jewel
- Release date: March 19, 1918
- Running time: 7 reels (70 minutes)
- Country: United States
- Language: Silent (English intertitles)
- Box office: $1 million (rentals)

The Kaiser, the Beast of Berlin (also known as The Beast of Berlin and The Kaiser) is a 1918 American silent war propaganda melodrama film produced and directed by, and starring, Rupert Julian. The screenplay was co-written by Rupert Julian and Elliott J. Clawson. The film's supporting cast included Elmo Lincoln, Nigel De Brulier, Harry Von Meter and Lon Chaney.

No known prints of the film survive. The Kaiser, the Beast of Berlin is one of the films included on the American Film Institute's list of the "Ten Most Wanted" lost films. A still exists showing Lon Chaney as "Herr Bethmann-Hollweg" standing directly behind the Kaiser (Rupert Julian). The film's program cover also exists.

The germanophobic film contains a propagandist view of the First World War, showing the political greed of the German Kaiser Wilhelm II, the resistance of some of his own soldiers, and fanciful prediction of the nature of the war's end. The film is now considered lost.

== Synopsis ==
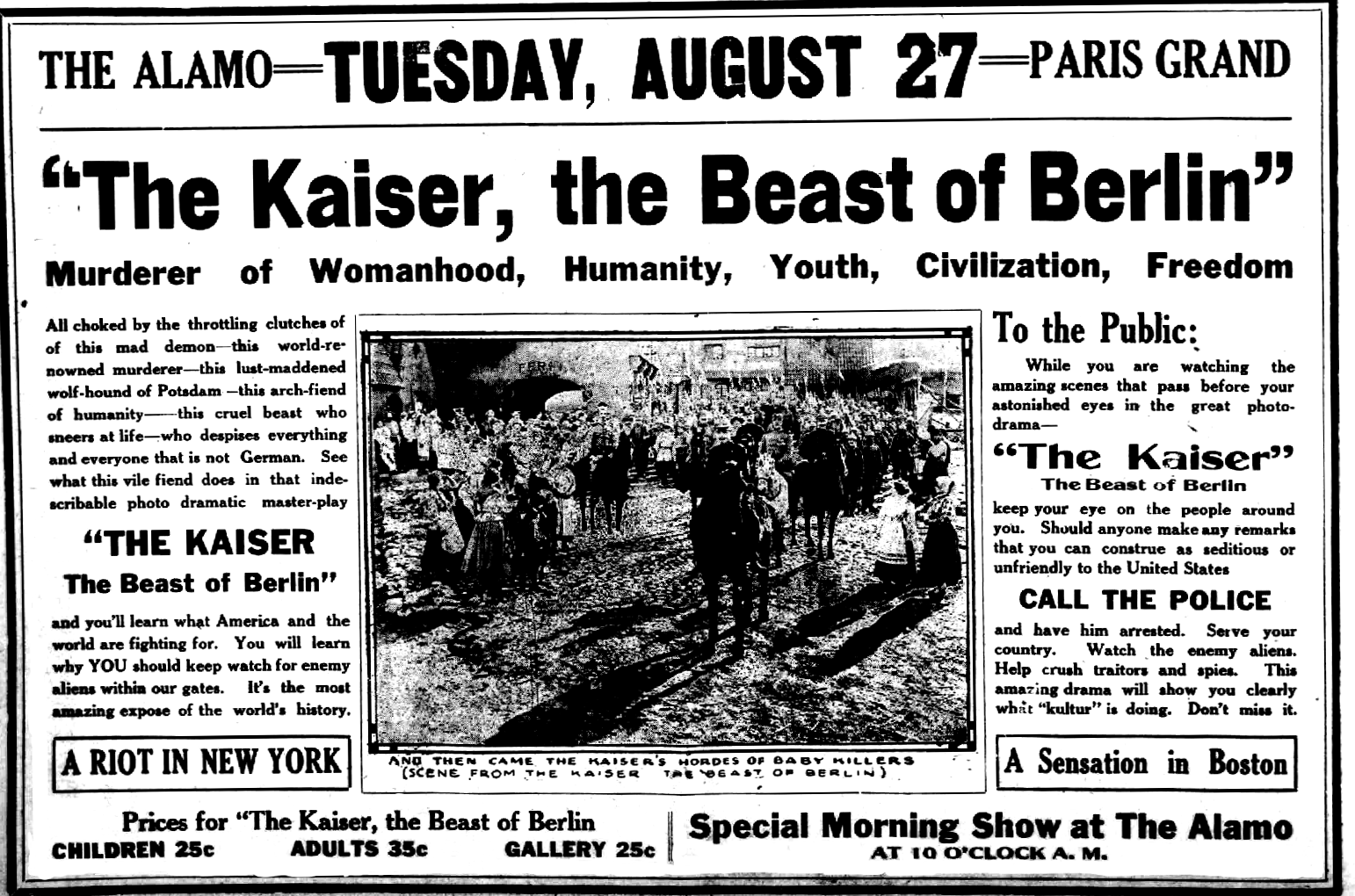
Half-page newspaper ad for the film. Tells viewers to call police if people around them are doing things out of the ordinary.

Kaiser Wilhelm II of Hohenzollern is a vain and arrogant tyrant eager for conquest. The Kaiser is slapped by one of his captains in anger, who then commits suicide to atone for his disgrace. Despite having signed a peace treaty with his neighbors, the Kaiser decides to declare war on Belgium. When Belgium is invaded by the German army during World War I, Marcas, a mighty-muscled blacksmith, although wounded, is able to save his daughter from the clutches of a German soldier, whom he kills and disposes of in a burning building. Soon after this, the RMS Lusitania is sunk by Captain von Neigle, and the Kaiser gives him a medal for his action, but the captain is later driven mad with remorse at the thought of the innocent women and children he killed. After the United States declares war, the Allied generals turn the Kaiser over to Albert I of Belgium. Incarcerated, the Kaiser faces his jailer, Marcas the blacksmith.

== Cast ==
- Rupert Julian as The Kaiser
- Elmo Lincoln as Marcas, The Blacksmith
- Nigel De Brulier as Captain Von Neigle
- Lon Chaney as Bethmann-Hollweg
- Mark Fenton as Admiral Von Tirpitz
- Harry von Meter as Captain Von Hancke
- Harry Carter as General Von Kluck
- Joseph W. Girard as Ambassador Gerard
- Harry Holden as General Joffre
- Alfred Allen as General John Pershing
- C.E. Anderson as Captain Kovich
- W.H. Bainbridge as Colonel Schmiedcke
- Henry A. Barrows as General Douglas Haig
- F. Beauregard as General Von Weddingen
- Walter Belasco as Admiral Von Pliscott
- Betty Carpenter as Bride
- Edward Clark as General Erich Von Falkenhagen
- Ruth Clifford as Gabrielle
- Wallace Coburn as General Rüdiger Von Der Goltz
- F. Corcoran as General Von Hoetzendorf
- Orlo Eastman as President Woodrow Wilson
- Robert Gordon as Louis Lomenie
- Winter Hall as Dr. Von Gressler
- Wadsworth Harris as General Von Ruesselheim
- Georgie Hupp as Little Jean
- Ruby Lafayette as Grandmother Marcas
- Gretchen Lederer as Bertha Von Neigle
- Frankie Lee as Hansel
- Jack MacDonald as King Albert
- K. Painter as General Hans Von Beseler
- Zoe Rae as Gretel
- Allan Sears as Captain Von Wohlbold
- Jay Smith as Marshal Von Hindenburg
- Pedro Sose as General Porfirio Díaz

== Production notes ==
Although frequently listed as a Universal Studios production, the film was actually an independent production produced by Rupert Julian for Renowned Pictures. Julian licensed the distribution rights to Renowned, who in turn sold the rights to Universal Jewel for worldwide distribution right after the film's New York premiere.

Rupert Julian would later direct Lon Chaney in the 1925 blockbuster The Phantom of the Opera. Writer Elliott J. Clawson later went on to write the screenplays for several other Chaney films, including The Phantom of the Opera, The Road to Mandalay and West of Zanzibar. Some reviews at the time oddly mentioned Erich von Stroheim's involvement in the film as both a co-writer as well as an uncredited extra, but this is unproven.

== Reception ==
The Kaiser, the Beast of Berlin was an enormous hit for Universal when it was released, and they spared no expense in advertising the film. Universal studio head Carl Laemmle pushed the film to the theater owners as hard as he sold it to the viewing public. "A whirlwind of Applause – A Landslide of Money," "Unparalleled Receipts," and "The Picture That Blocked Traffic on Broadway" were some of the headlines for ads that ran in trade publications in an attempt to get theater owners to book the picture. At one point, the film was playing simultaneously in two Broadway theaters owned by Marcus Loew and William Fox.

According to a report in Exhibitor's Trade Review on the film's success in Omaha, 14,000 saw the film there in a single week, a record for that city. "Wild cheering marked every show when the young captain socked the Kaiser on the jaw. Patriotic societies boosted the picture because of its aid in stirring up the country to war. Street car signs were used; huge street banners swung over the crowds in the downtown district, and a truck paraded the streets with the Kaiser hanging in effigy and a big sign 'All pro-Germans will be admitted free.' None availed himself of the invitation."

Rupert Julian received rave reviews for his portrayal of the Kaiser and later reprised the role in many subsequent films.

== Reviews ==
"(The film) dramatizes patriotism more intensely than any other picture this writer has seen. It combines a wonderful characterization of the Kaiser rendered by Rupert Julian and an intimate drama of one family who suffered when the German hordes swept through Belgium." --- Motion Picture News

"The main intent of the producers, and they have adhered to it admirably, was to give the observer a look at the private and public life of this human monster...Mr. Julian's personal dilineation of the Kaiser is a splendid bit of acting all told...There are any number of bold and vigorous characterizations in the piece (including) Lon Chaney as Admiral von Tirpitz." --- Moving Picture World (Note this review strangely refers to Lon Chaney playing Admiral Von Terpitz, while all other sources list Chaney in the role of "Bethmann-Holweg").

"THE KAISER is less a photoplay than a dramatic presentation of the crimes of Germany dominated by the Satanic sneer of her leader. It shows the invasion of Belgium, the wreck of the Lusitania and the attempted drive toward Paris all guided by a fiend in a royal helmet and spiked moustache who does everything but snort fire. Rupert Julian impersonates this master villain so successfully that his entrance is greeted with spontaneous hisses." --- Photoplay

== In popular culture ==
In August 1918, a short (two-reel) parody of the film was released titled The Geezer of Berlin.

== See also ==
- List of lost films
- Hitler – Beast of Berlin
