= My Little Boy =

1917 American drama film directed by Elsie Jane Wilson

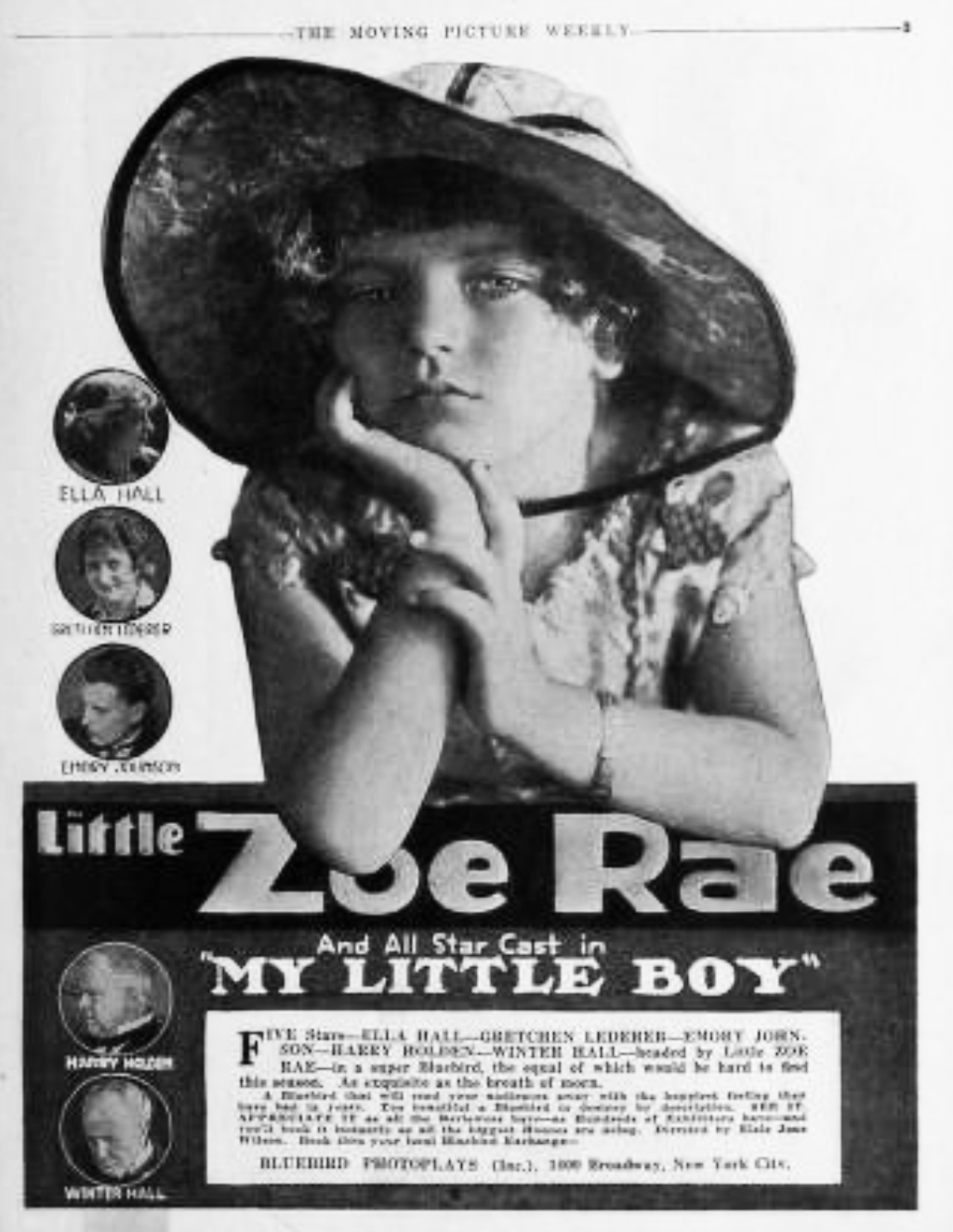
- Ad in Motion Picture Weekly
- Directed by: Elsie Jane Wilson
- Written by: Elliott J. Clawson scenario Rupert Julian story
- Produced by: Bluebird Photoplays
- Starring: Zoe Rae; Ella Hall; Emory Johnson
- Cinematography: Stephen Rounds
- Production company: Bluebird Photoplays
- Distributed by: Bluebird Photoplays
- Release date: December 1917
- Running time: 5 reels
- Country: United States
- Language: Silent (English intertitles)

My Little Boy is a 1917 American silent drama directed by Elsie Jane Wilson based on the story by Rupert Julian with the scenario written by Elliott J. Clawson. The film stars Zoe Rae, Ella Hall and Emory Johnson. The film was released on December 17, 1917, by Universal Film Manufacturing Company under by the name Bluebird Photoplays.

== Cast ==
- Zoe Rae as Paul
- Ella Hall as Clara
- Emory Johnson as Fred
- Winter Hall as Uncle Oliver
- Harry Holden as Joe
- Gretchen Lederer as Clara's Mother

== Preservation ==
The film is now considered lost.
