= Gretchen Lederer =

German actress

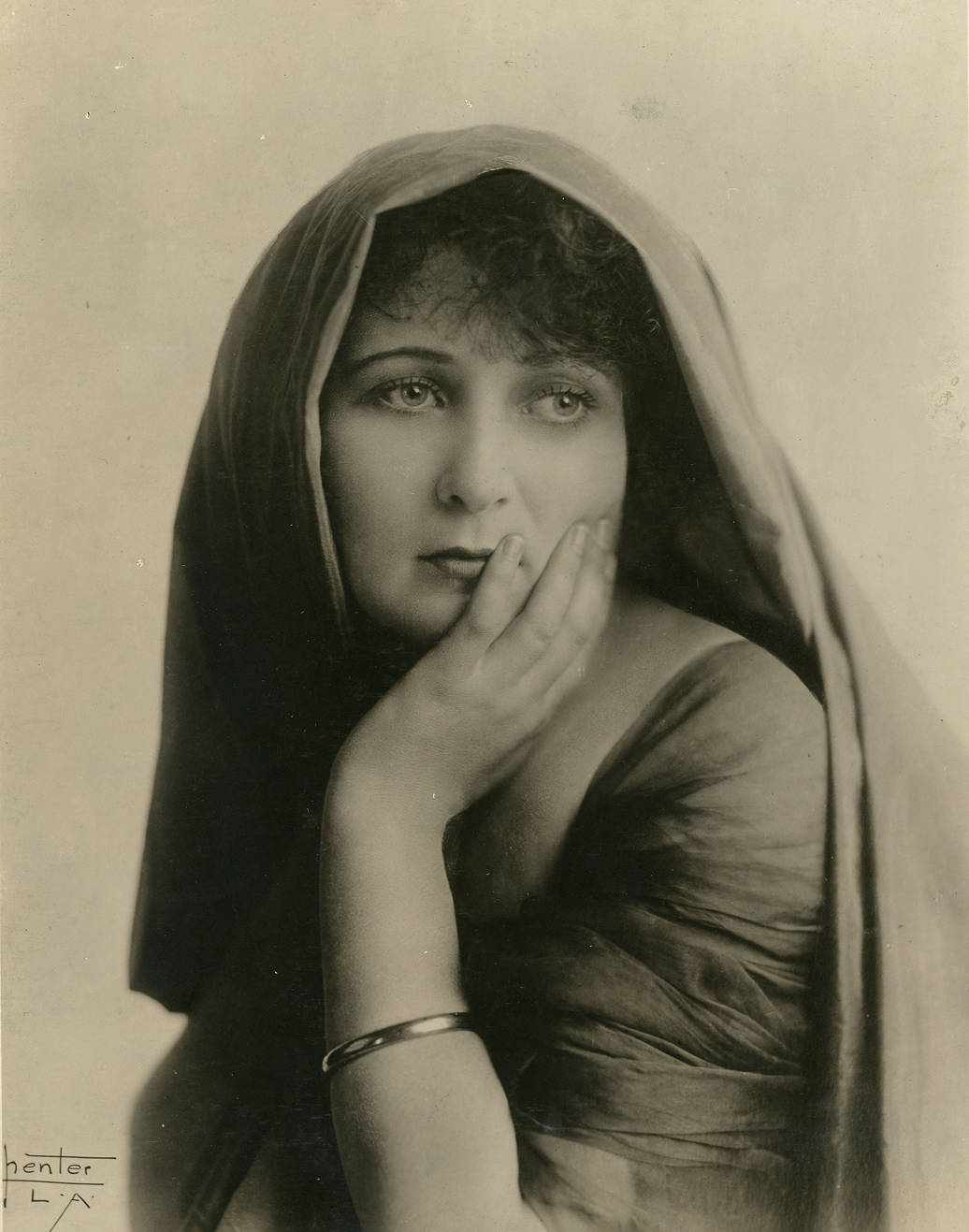
- Lederer in 1924
- Born: Gretchen Schwallenback; 23 May 1891; Cologne, German Empire
- Died: 20 December 1955 (aged 64); Anaheim, California, U.S.
- Occupation: Actress
- Years active: 1912–1918
- Spouses: Otto Lederer, Lewis Henry Haney
- Children: 1

Gretchen Lederer (née Schwallenback; 23 May 1891 – 20 December 1955) was a German actress of the silent era. She appeared in more than 80 films between 1912 and 1918.

== Personal life ==
Gretchen Lederer was born in Cologne, Germany. She was married twice. Her first husband was the Austrian-American actor Otto Lederer. The couple had one son, Leroy Lederer Shepek (1908–1940). Her second husband was the conservative American economist Lewis Henry Haney. Gretchen Lederer was still with him in 1955, when she died in Anaheim, California at age 64.

== Selected filmography ==
- Hearts in Conflict (1912)
- The Violin Maker (1915)
- The Chimney's Secret (1915)
- The Millionaire Paupers (1915)
- Under a Shadow (1915)
- Lord John's Journal (1915)
- Lord John in New York (1915)
- Bobbie of the Ballet (1916)
- The Grasp of Greed (1916)
- The Mark of Cain (1916)
- If My Country Should Call (1916)
- The Yaqui (1916)
- Doctor Neighbor (1916)
- Black Friday (1916)
- A Yoke of Gold (1916)
- The Morals of Hilda (1916)
- Little Eve Edgarton (1916)
- My Little Boy (1917)
- The Silent Lady (1917)
- The Little Pirate (1917)
- The Spotted Lily (1917)
- The Lair of the Wolf (1917)
- Bondage (1917)
- The Cricket (1917)
- Polly Redhead (1917)
- The Greater Law (1917)
- Princess Virtue (1917)
- The Little Orphan (1917)
- The Rescue (1917)
- New Love For Old (1918)
- The Model's Confession (1918)
- The Kaiser, the Beast of Berlin (1918)
- Riddle Gawne (1918)
- Hungry Eyes (1918)
- Wife or Country (1918)
