= The Circus of Life =

The Circus of Life may refer to:

- The Circus of Life (1926 film), a German silent film
- The Circus of Life (1917 film), an American silent drama film

== See also ==
- Circus of Life, a 1921 German silent drama film
