= Hungry Eyes (disambiguation) =

"Hungry Eyes" is a song by Eric Carmen.

Hungry Eyes may also refer to:

- "Hungry Eyes" (Merle Haggard song)
- Hungry Eyes (film)
- "Hungry Eyes" (D:TNG episode)
- "Hungry Eyes", a song by Sheena Easton from A Private Heaven, 1984
- "Hungry Eyes", a song by Sniff 'n' the Tears from Ride Blue Divide, 1982
