= Sweet Rosie O'Grady (1926 film) =

1926 film directed by Frank R. Strayer

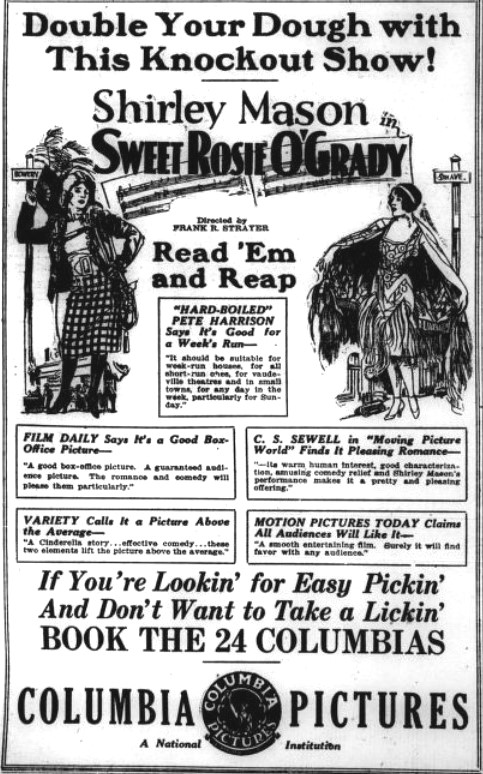
- Advertisement
- Directed by: Frank R. Strayer
- Screenplay by: Harry O. Hoyt
- Based on: Sweet Rosie O'Grady; 1896 song suggestion by Maude Nugent
- Produced by: Harry Cohn
- Starring: Shirley Mason; Cullen Landis; E. Alyn Warren
- Cinematography: J. O. Taylor
- Production company: Columbia Pictures
- Distributed by: Columbia Pictures
- Release date: October 5, 1926 (U.S.)
- Running time: 7 reels
- Country: United States
- Language: Silent (English intertitles)

Sweet Rosie O'Grady is a 1926 American silent comedy drama film directed by Frank R. Strayer from a screenplay by Harry O. Hoyt. The film was released by Columbia Pictures on October 5, 1926, and stars Shirley Mason, Cullen Landis, and E. Alyn Warren.

== Cast list ==
- Shirley Mason as Rosie O'Grady
- Cullen Landis as Victor McQuade
- E. Alyn Warren as Uncle Ben Shapiro
- William Conklin as James Brady
- Lester Bernard as Kibitzer
- Otto Lederer as Friend

== Preservation status ==
With no prints of Sweet Rosie O'Grady located in any film archives, it is a lost film.
