= Butterfly (company) =

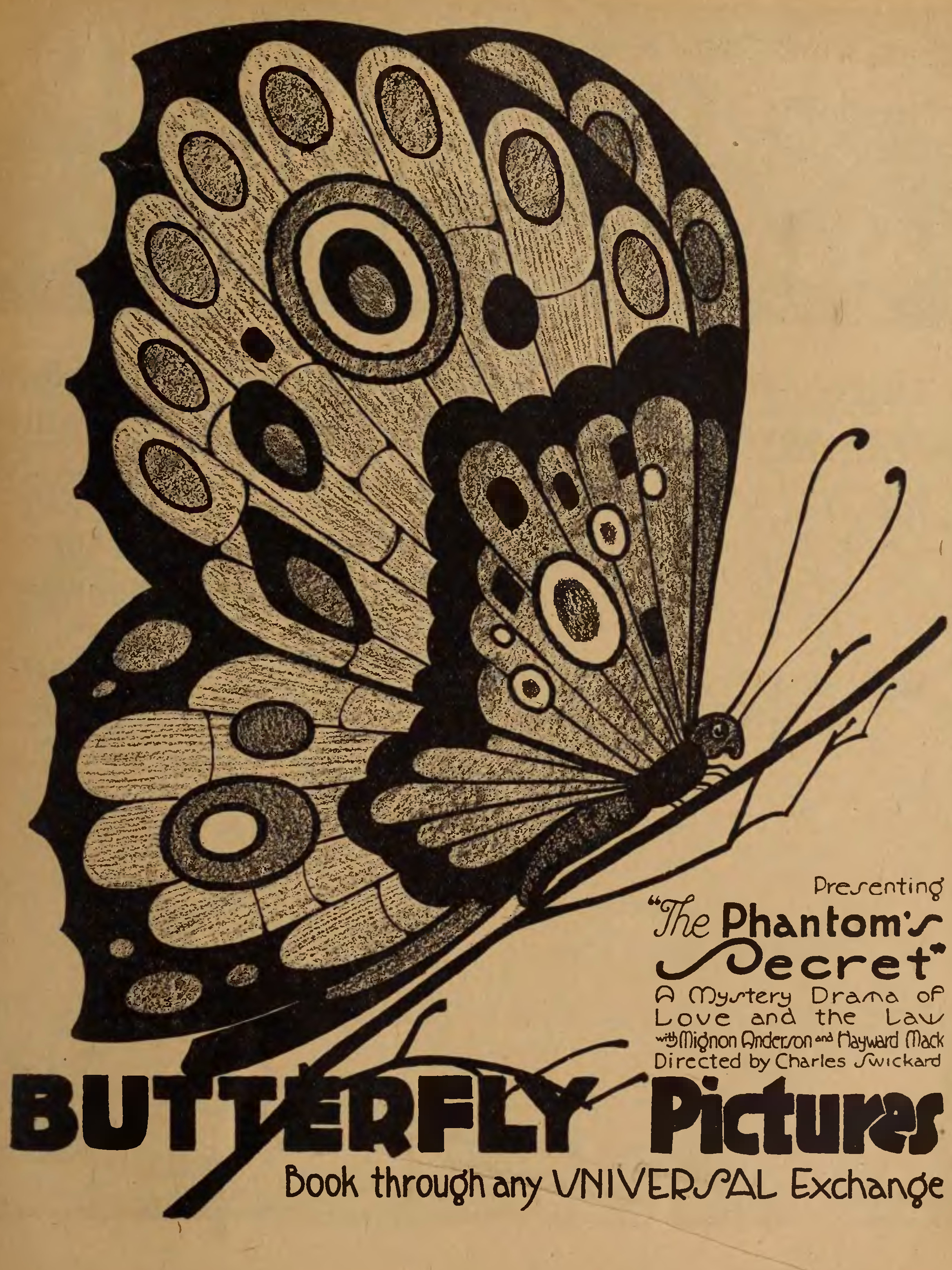
"Butterfly Pictures presenting The Phantom's Secret" ad in Moving Picture Weekly (1915-1920)

Butterfly also known as Butterfly Pictures was a film production company that produced and released films spanned as part of the Universal Film Manufacturing Company program from 1917 to 1918.

== History ==
On April 28, 1917, Butterfly Pictures was announced in Motography a new brand of feature films that would be released as part of the Universal exchanges. These films would be five reels in length and would be produced at the Universal Film Manufacturing Company studios in California.

== List of Butterfly films ==
Name	Release date (Year/Month/Date)	Director	Braff Index (Note: Index listings instead of page numbers are provided for easier referencing of Braff's two volume index.)
Eternal Love	1917-05-07	Douglas Gerrard	2180
The Phantom's Secret	1917-05-14	Charles Swickard	6167
Like Wild Fire	1917-05-21	Stuart Paton	4608
Money Madness	1917-05-25	Henry McRae	5360
The Circus of Life	1917-06-04	Rupert Julian	1350
The Field of Honor	1917-06-11	Allen J. Holubar	2379
The Flame of Youth	1917-06-23	Elmer Clifton	2533
Man and Beast	1917-06-25	Henry McRae	4982
The Plow Woman	1917-07-02	Charles Swickard	6248
The Reed Case	1917-07-09	Allen J. Holubar	6610
High Speed	1917-07-16	George L. Sargent	3566
The Double Standard	1917-07-23	Phillips Smalley	2005
Follow the Girl	1917-08-06	Louis W. Chaudet	2623
The Midnight Man	1917-08-13	Elmer Clifton	5221
The Lair of the Wolf	1917-08-20	Charles Swickard	4441
Straight Shooting; Alternatively: Joan of the Cattlelands	1917-08-27	John Ford	7693
Who Was the Other Man?	1917-09-03	Francis Ford	9092
The Little Pirate	1917-09-10	Elsie Jane Wilson	4683
The Spindle of Life	1917-09-17	George Cochrane	7552
The Edge of the Law	1917-09-24	Louis W. Chaudet	2117
The Secret Man	1917-10-01	John Ford	7030
The Girl Who Won Out	1917-10-08	Eugene Moore	2978
Forty Nine-Seventeen ('49-'17)	1917-10-15	Ruth Ann Baldwin	2729
Society's Driftwood	1917-10-22	Louis W. Chaudet	7436
A Marked Man	1917-10-29	John Ford	5070
John Ermine of the Yellowstone	1917-11-05	Francis Ford	4248
The Cricket	1917-11-12	Elsie Jane Wilson	1541
The Man from Montana	1917-11-19	George Marshall	4989
Fear Not	1917-11-26	Allen J. Holubar	2357
Fighting Maid	1917-12-03	Edward J. Le Saint	2443
The Silent Lady	1917-12-10	Elsie Jane Wilson	7250
Beloved Jim	1917-12-17	Stuart Paton	528
Bucking Broadway	1917-12-24	John Ford	973
The High Sign	1917-12-31	Elmer Clifton	3564
The Wolf and His Mate	1918-01-07	Edward J. Le Saint	9257
Madame Spy	1918-01-21	Douglas Gerrard	4936
A Kitchen Hero	1918-04-06	Allen Curtis	4388

== See also ==
- Bluebird Photoplays
