= Eternal Love (1917 film) =

- Directed by: Douglas Gerrard
- Screenplay by: E. Magnus Ingleton
- Story by: E. Magnus Ingleton
- Cinematography: Jack MacKenzie
- Production company: Butterfly Pictures
- Distributed by: Universal Film Manufacturing Company
- Release date: May 7, 1917
- Running time: 5 reels
- Country: United States
- Languages: Silent film English intertitles

Eternal Love is a 1917 American silent drama film produced by Butterfly Pictures and released by Universal Pictures.

== Plot ==
The film focuses on Paul Dechellette, a French artist in the Latin Quarter of Paris. He celebrates the announcement of the Gautier Art Student Prize Competition, the theme of which is "A Message of Spring". He travels to Brittany to seek inspiration and finds it a peasant maid and orphan named Mignon. She decided to pose for his painting "The Call of Spring". Dechellette falls in love with Mignon and gives her an engagement ring, proclaiming that he will return "when the roses bloom again" and marry her. Paul returns and wins the competition with his painting, but he forgets about Mignon.

One day Cou-Cou, another artist and rival who lost the competition to Paul, is struck by an automobile and injured. In the confusion, a reporter takes the name of Paul and publishes the notice of the accident in the paper. In Brittany, Mignon reads of the accident and decides to head to Paris to find him. Because she is poor and unable to afford transportation, Mignon decides to walk to Paris. The journey is difficult and she arrives in Paris in a very weakened state and falls on the doorstep of the Blanc home. Monsieur Blanc, a baker who runs a shop near Paul's studio, and his wife try to discourage Mignon from seeking out the disreputable Paul. Mignon decides to go and arrives at the studio when Paul is hosting a dinner party, there she finds Paul sitting with not one, but two women. Mignon stands, transfixed, as the sight of Paul and the girls, Mimi and Fifi, before running from the room and fainting at the baker's shop. Paul, who saw her, rushes out to search for her, but cannot find her.

Mignon leaves the ring and a note for Paul in her wooden shoes, having resolved to commit suicide by throwing herself into the river. On the way she passes Francois Gautier, the famous painter and donator of the prize, and he stops her and listens to her story. Gautier offers to shelter Mignon and she becomes like a daughter to him. One day, Gautier's death comes suddenly and Mignon finds herself as his heiress. Mignon decides to dedicate her live to saving outcast women. Paul learns of her inheritance and goes to the Gautier mansion, asking to see her. Mignon refuses as first, but then sees him only to inform her that she does not love him. In despair, Paul wanders all night in a storm and is found nearly dead the next morning on a park bench. Cou-cou, sends for Mignon who comes to Paul's bedside. Mignon comes and forgives Paul, and they decide to marry. (Note: A combined plot summary is used from the official summary in the Moving Picture World and the reviews in Variety, Motography and Moving Picture World.)

== Cast and production ==
- Douglas Gerrard as Paul Dechellette
- Ruth Clifford as Mignon
- George Gebhart as Cou-Cou
- Edward Clark as Francois Gautier
- Dan Duffy as Monsieur Blanc
- Miss Marvin as Madame Blanc
- Myrtle Reeves as Mimi

The film was the first production of the new brand, Butterfly Pictures, and had a skilled cast from the Universal Film Manufacturing Company's staff. The film was produced in studios in California. The scenario was written by E. M. Ingleton.

== Release and reception ==
The five reel film was released on May 7, 1917, and it was the first release by the new Butterfly Pictures. Variety panned the film for its poor quality and Douglas Gerrard's double role as both the leading man and as the director of the production with the common theme of "Eternal Love". Variety popularized this as one of those burlesque shows in which he "hogs all the footage" as a vehicle in which to promote his own acting. Robert McElravy found that the common theme of "Eternal Love" was not an original plot, but the acting by the cast did put some originality to the production. McElravy criticized one or two instances of the improper use of the settings for the film and the poor makeup application applied to Gerrard in the final scenes.
