= The Little Pirate =

- Directed by: Elsie Jane Wilson
- Written by: Elliott J. Clawson; Norris Shannon
- Starring: Zoe Rae; Charles West; Frank Brownlee
- Cinematography: Stephen Rounds
- Production company: Universal Pictures
- Distributed by: Universal Pictures
- Release date: September 10, 1917
- Running time: 50 minutes
- Country: United States
- Languages: Silent; English intertitles

The Little Pirate is a 1917 American silent family adventure film directed by Elsie Jane Wilson and starring Zoe Rae, Charles West and Frank Brownlee.

== Cast ==
- Zoe Rae as Margery
- Charles West as George Drake
- Frank Brownlee as John Baird
- Gretchen Lederer as Virginia Baird
- Frederick Titus as Butler
- Lillian Peacock as Maid
- Burwell Hamrick as Captain Kidd Jr.

== Bibliography ==
- Robert B. Connelly. The Silents: Silent Feature Films, 1910-36, Volume 40, Issue 2. December Press, 1998.
