= The Cricket (1917 film) =

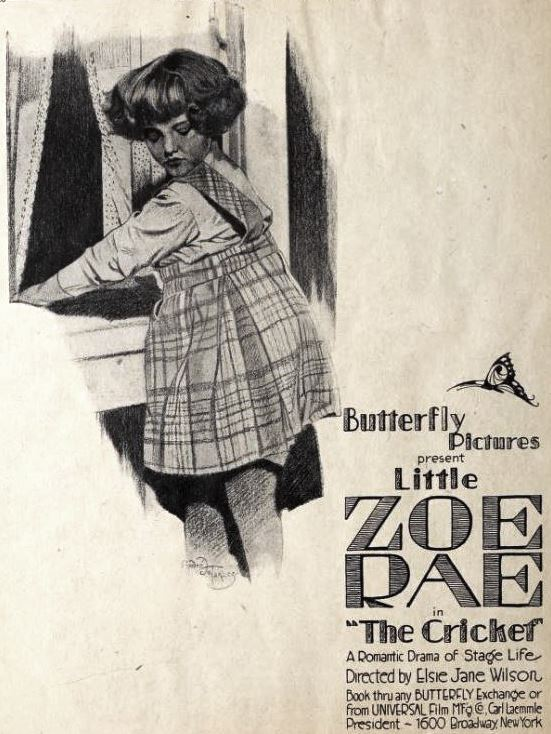
- Directed by: Elsie Jane Wilson
- Written by: Elliott J. Clawson
- Starring: Gretchen Lederer; Zoe Rae; Winter Hall
- Cinematography: Stephen Rounds
- Production company: Universal Pictures
- Distributed by: Universal Pictures
- Release date: November 12, 1917
- Running time: 50 minutes
- Country: United States
- Languages: Silent; English intertitles

A reel from The Cricket

The Cricket is a 1917 American silent drama film directed by Elsie Jane Wilson and starring Gretchen Lederer, Zoe Rae and Winter Hall. A print of The Cricket exists.

== Cast ==
- Zoe Rae as The Cricket as a child
- Rena Rogers as The Cricket as an adult
- Fred Warren as Saveline
- Harry Holden as Caesar
- Winter Hall as Pinglet
- George Hupp as Pascal as a boy
- Hallam Cooley as Pascal as an adult
- Gretchen Lederer as The Cricket's Mother

== Bibliography ==
- Robert B. Connelly. The Silents: Silent Feature Films, 1910-36, Volume 40, Issue 2. December Press, 1998.
