= The Canceled Mortgage =

1915 film

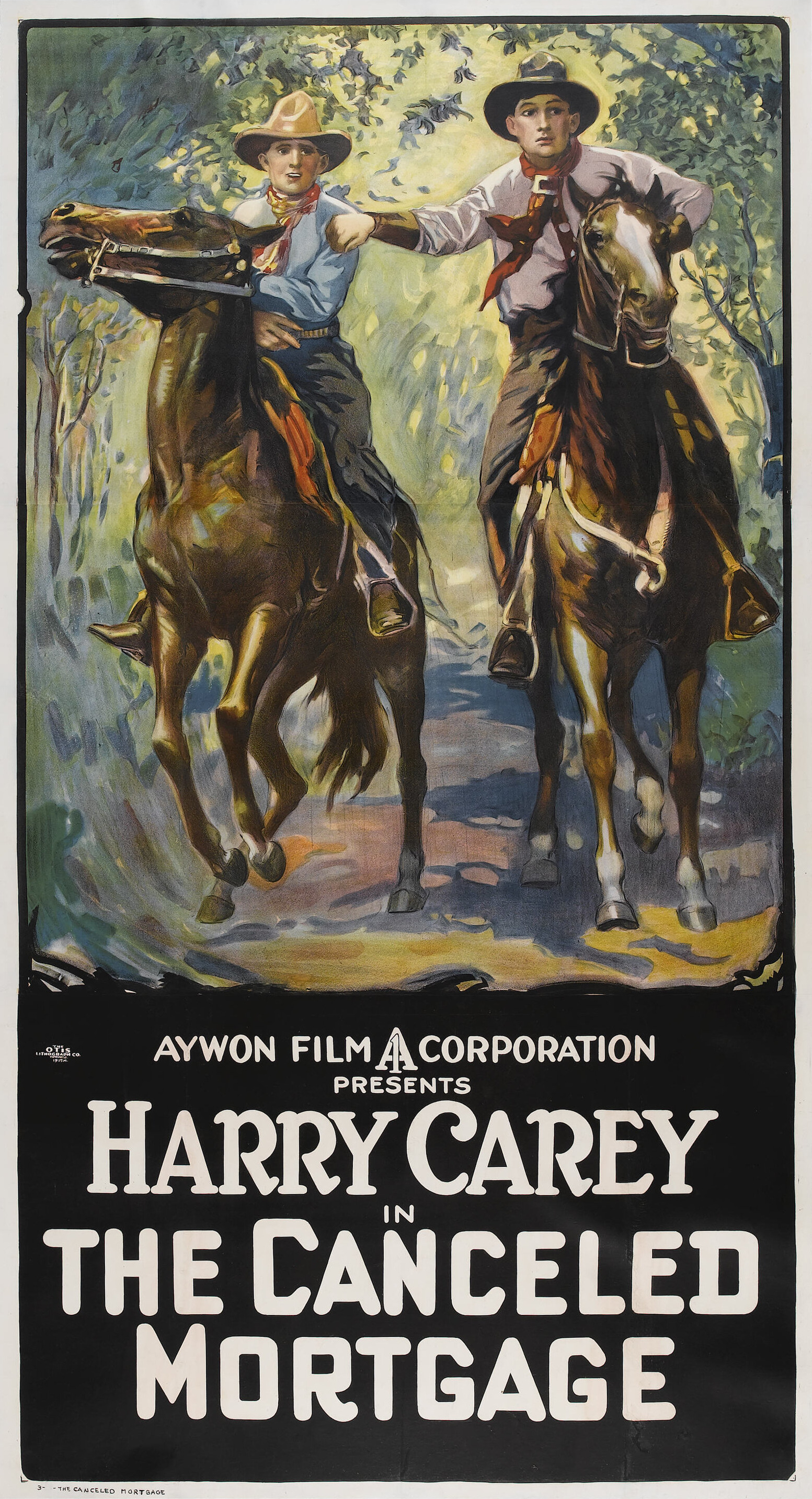
- Starring: Harry Carey
- Release date: May 17, 1915
- Country: United States
- Language: Silent with English intertitles

The Canceled Mortgage is a 1915 drama film featuring Harry Carey.

== Cast ==
- Harry Carey as 1st Road Agent
- Claire McDowell
- Barney Furey
- Zoe Rae (credited as Zoe Bech)

== See also ==
- List of American films of 1915
- Harry Carey filmography
