= Oliver Twist (1916 film) =

1916 film by James Young

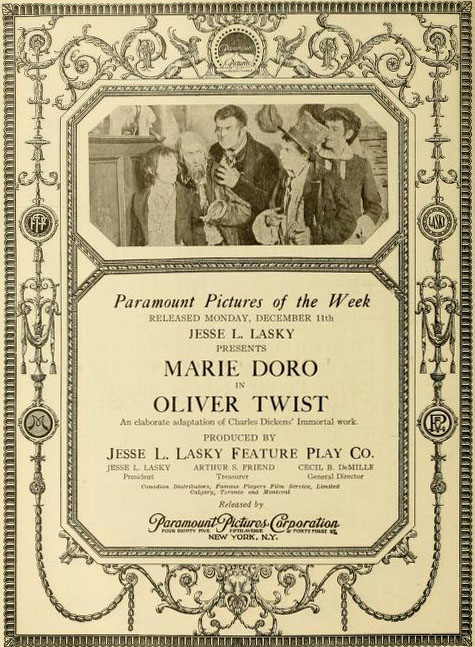
- Directed by: James Young; W. S. Van Dyke (ass't director); Dudley Blanchard (ass't director)
- Written by: James Young (scenario); Winthrop Ames (scenario)
- Based on: Oliver Twist; 1837 novel by Charles Dickens
- Produced by: Jesse L. Lasky
- Starring: Marie Doro; Tully Marshall; Hobart Bosworth; Raymond Hatton
- Cinematography: Harold Rosson
- Distributed by: Paramount Pictures
- Release date: December 10, 1916
- Running time: 5 reels
- Country: United States
- Languages: Silent; English intertitles

Oliver Twist is a lost 1916 silent film drama produced by Jesse L. Lasky and distributed by Paramount Pictures. It was directed by James Young. It is based on the famous 1838 novel, Oliver Twist, by Charles Dickens and the 1912 Broadway stage version of the novel.

Marie Doro had played Oliver on Broadway in 1912 to much acclaim and was brought in by Lasky to reprise her role in this film. In fact, the main reason this film was made was to showcase Doro rather than Dickens. In the play, the parts of Nancy, Fagin and Bill Sykes were played by Constance Collier, Nat C. Goodwin and Lyn Harding respectively. Elsie Jane Wilson who had a supporting part in the play is Nancy in the film. Wilson and Doro are the only players from the play to appear in this film.

Four film versions had been made prior to this film: in 1907, 1909 and two in 1912, the year of Doro's stage success. A later 1922 silent version starred Lon Chaney and Jackie Coogan.

== Cast ==
- Marie Doro - Oliver Twist
- Tully Marshall - Fagin
- Hobart Bosworth - Bill Sykes
- Raymond Hatton - Jack Hawkins, "The Artful Dodger"
- James Neill - Mr. Brownlow
- Edythe Chapman - Mrs. Brownlow
- Elsie Jane Wilson - Nancy
- Harry Rattenbury - Mr. Bumble
- Carl Stockdale - Monks
- W. S. Van Dyke - Charles Dickens
