= The Dream Lady =

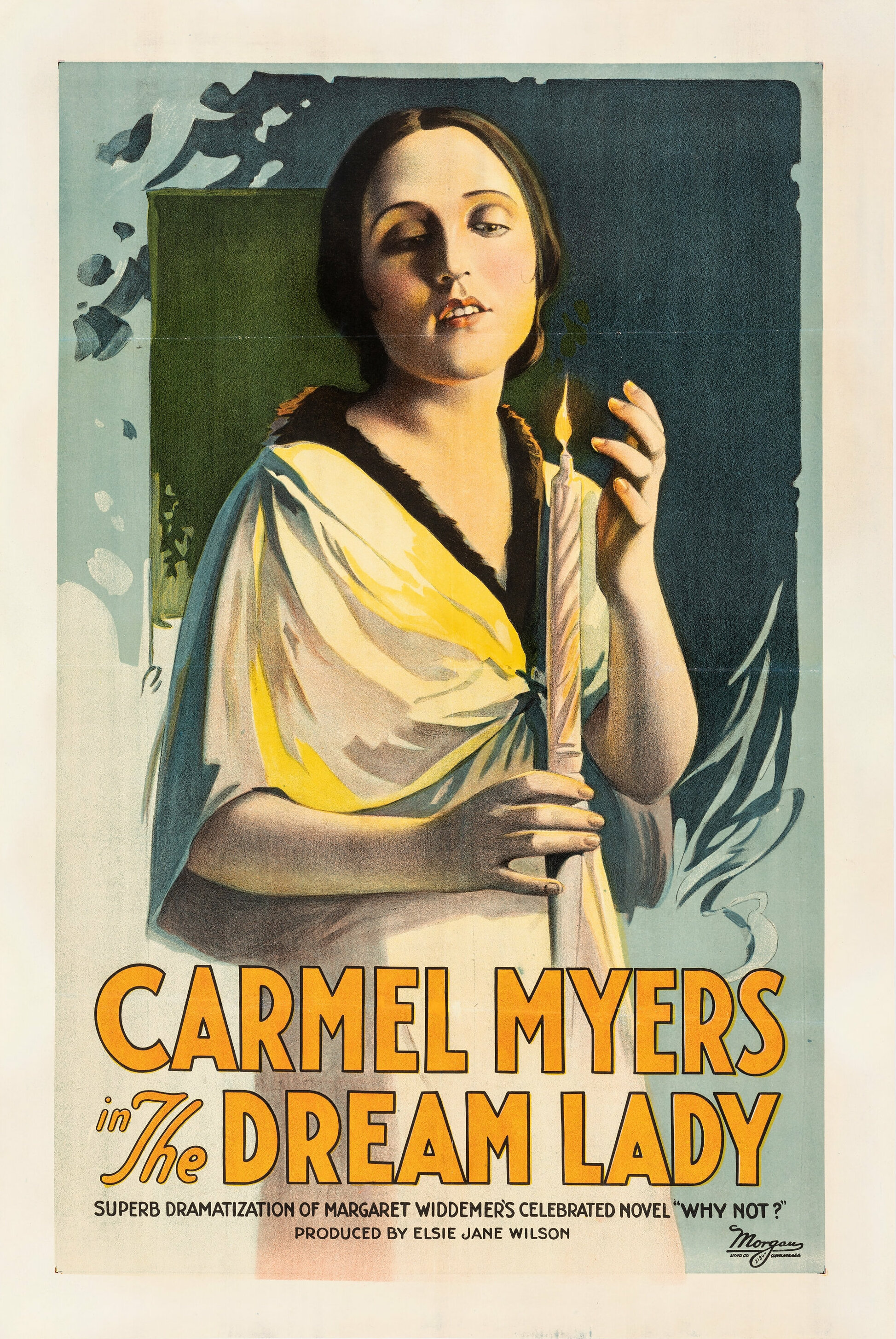
- Poster
- Directed by: Elsie Jane Wilson
- Written by: Fred Myton
- Based on: Why Not? by Margaret Widdemer
- Produced by: Bluebird Photoplays
- Starring: Carmel Myers
- Distributed by: Universal Film Manufacturing Company
- Release date: July 29, 1918
- Running time: 54 minutes
- Country: United States
- Language: Silent (English intertitles)

The Dream Lady is a 1918 American silent drama film directed by Elsie Jane Wilson and starring Carmel Myers. It was produced by Bluebird Photoplays and distributed by Universal Film Manufacturing Company.

== Cast ==
- Carmel Myers as Rosamund Gilbert
- Thomas Holding as John Squire
- Kathleen Emerson as Sydney Brown
- Harry von Meter as James Mattison
- Philo McCullough as Jerrold
- Elizabeth Janes as Allie

== Preservation ==
The film is preserved in a European film archive, the French archive Centre national du cinéma et de l'image animée in Fort de Bois-d'Arcy.
