= E. Alyn Warren =

American actor

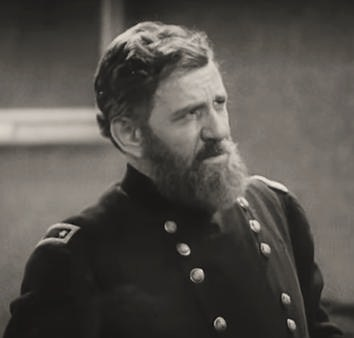
- Warren portraying Ulysses S. Grant in the 1930 film Abraham Lincoln.
- Born: Edward Alyn Warren; June 2, 1874; Richmond, Virginia, U.S.
- Died: January 22, 1940 (aged 65); Woodland Hills, Los Angeles, California, U.S.
- Resting place: Chapel of the Pines Crematory
- Occupation: Actor
- Years active: 1915-1940

Edward Alyn Warren (June 2, 1874 – January 22, 1940) was an American actor. He appeared in more than 100 films between 1915 and 1940. In some early silent films he was credited as Fred Warren or E. A. Warren. He was born in Richmond, Virginia and died in Woodland Hills, Los Angeles. He died at the age of 65.

== Filmography ==
Year	Title	Role	Notes
1915	Money	Antome Johanson	Film debut
1917	Mother O' Mine	Romeo Bonelli	
1917	The Mysterious Mr. Tiller	Rosario	
1917	The Silent Lady	Dr. Carlyle	
1918	Mother o' Mine	Romeo Bonelli	
1918	The Wine Girl	Chico Piave	
1918	New Love for Old	Louis Bracchi	
1918	Her Only Way	Judge Hampton Bates	
1918	The Forbidden City	Wong Li	
1919	The Fire Flingers	Chris Cotterill	
1919	Yvonne from Paris	Luigi	
1919	The Tiger Lily	Giovanni	
1920	The Virgin of Stamboul	Yusef Bey	
1920	Twins of Suffering Creek	Scipio Jones	
1920	Outside the Law	Chang Lo	
1921	A Tale of Two Worlds	Ah Wing	
1921	No Woman Knows	Rabbi Thalman	
1921	The Millionaire	Evers	
1921	The Man Who		
1922	The Truthful Liar	Peteer Vanetti	
1922	East Is West	Lo Sang Kee	
1922	Hungry Hearts	Abraham	
1923	The Courtship of Miles Standish	Myles Standish	
1925	The Unholy Three	Prosecuting Attorney	
1926	Born to the West	Sam Rudd	
1926	The Bells	Jethro Koweski/Baruch Koweski	
1926	Sweet Rosie O'Grady	Uncle Ben Shapiro	
1927	The Opening Night	Robert Chandler	
1928	The Trail of '98	Train Engineer	
1928	Red Wine	Jacks First Friend	
1929	Chasing Through Europe	Louise Herriot	
1930	Son of the Gods	Lee Ying	
1930	Prince of Diamonds	Li Fang	
1930	The Medicine Man	Goltz	
1930	Abraham Lincoln	Stephen A. Douglas/Ulysses S. Grant	
1930	Du Barry, Woman of Passion	Denys	
1930	East Is West	Lo Sang Kee	
1931	Fighting Caravans	Barlow	Uncredited
1931	Shipmates	Wong	
1931	A Free Soul	Bottomley - Ace's Chinese Butler	Uncredited
1931	Daughter of the Dragon	Lu Chung	
1931	Secret Service	General U.S. Grant	
1932	The Hatchet Man	Soo Lat, The Cobbler	
1932	The Seventh Commandment	The Philosopher	
1932	The Washington Masquerade	Dr. Hyams	Uncredited
1932	The Mask of Fu Manchu	Goy Lo Sung - Fu Manchu Messenger	Uncredited
1933	Smoke Lightning	Carter Blake	
1933	Tarzan the Fearless	Dr. Brooks	
1934	The Cat and the Fiddle	Orchestra Leader	Uncredited
1934	The Trumpet Blows	Stationmaster	Uncredited
1934	Operator 13	Gen. Ulysses S. Grant	Uncredited
1934	The Cat's-Paw	Tien Wang	
1934	Wagon Wheels	Abner Mosley, The Factor	
1934	Student Tour	Saga	Uncredited
1934	Limehouse Blues	Ching Lee	
1934	The Mysterious Mr. Wong	Tsi Tung	
1935	Chinatown Squad	John Yee	
1935	Get That Man	Jay Malone, Private Investigator	
1935	Ship Cafe	Harry	
1935	Annie Oakley	Spectator	Uncredited
1936	I Conquer the Sea!	Sebastian	
1936	Dangerous Waters	Captain	Uncredited
1936	Revolt of the Zombies	Dr. Trevissant	
1936	The Devil-Doll	Commissioner	
1936	Women Are Trouble	Joe Eldridge	Uncredited
1937	You Only Live Once	Prison Chef	Uncredited
1937	Between Two Women	Dr. Owen	Uncredited
1937	They Won't Forget	Carlisle P. Buxton	
1937	Madame X	Clerk	Uncredited
1937	Double Wedding	Al - Desk Clerk	Uncredited
1937	Night Club Scandal	Waiter	Uncredited
1937	The Last Gangster	Country Club Caretaker	Uncredited
1937	The Bad Man of Brimstone	George Emerson	Uncredited
1938	The Girl of the Golden West	Miner	Uncredited
1938	Hold That Kiss	Sam	Uncredited
1938	Three Comrades	Bookstore Owner	Uncredited
1938	Port of Seven Seas	Captain Escartefigue	
1938	The Shining Hour	Leonard - Hannah's Servant	Uncredited
1938	Dramatic School	Stage Manager - National Theater	Uncredited
1938	The Girl Downstairs	Concierge	Uncredited
1939	North of Shanghai	Leader	
1939	Idiot's Delight	Clerk at Royal Grand Hotel	Uncredited
1939	The Adventures of Huckleberry Finn	Mr. Shackleford	Uncredited
1939	Sergeant Madden	Judge	Uncredited
1939	Broadway Serenade	Everett	Uncredited
1939	Tell No Tales	Sam - Janitor	Uncredited
1939	Miracles for Sale	Dr. Hendricks - the Coroner	Uncredited
1939	Those High Grey Walls	Convict	Uncredited
1939	The Amazing Mr. Williams	Clerk	
1939	Joe and Ethel Turp Call on the President	Father Reilly	Uncredited
1939	Gone with the Wind	Frank Kennedy's Clerk	Uncredited
1940	Convicted Woman	Mailman	
1940	Broadway Melody of 1940	Pop	Uncredited
