= The Iron Heart (1920 film) =

1920 film by Denison Clift

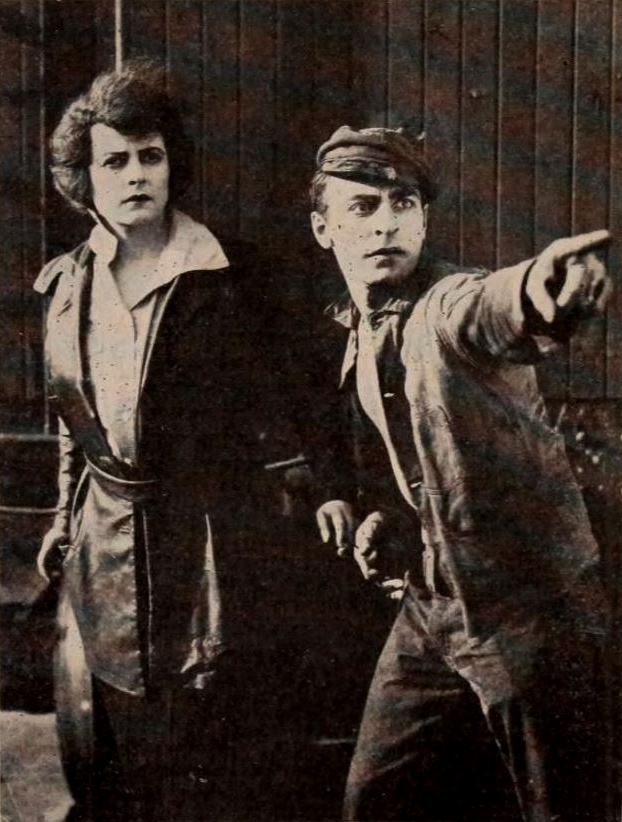
- Film still
- Directed by: Denison Clift
- Written by: Denison Clift
- Starring: Madlaine Traverse; George A. McDaniel; Edwin B. Tilton
- Cinematography: Walter Williams
- Edited by: Della Conley
- Production company: Fox Film Corporation
- Distributed by: Fox Film Corporation
- Release date: June 1920
- Running time: 5 reels
- Country: United States
- Language: Silent (English intertitles)

The Iron Heart is a 1920 American silent drama film directed by Denison Clift and starring Madlaine Traverse, George A. McDaniel, and Edwin B. Tilton.

== Plot ==
As described in a film magazine, John Regan's daughter Esther assumes management of the Regan Steel Mills upon her father's death. The Associated Trust endeavors to gain control of the mills, but meets with rebuff at the hands of Esther. Darwin McAllister, employed by the Trust to get Esther to sell out, finds himself in love with her and resigns from the Associated. He is employed by Miss Regan and thus arouses the jealousy of Dan Cullen, a dishonest employee of the Regan plant. Dan attempts to block the shipment of a consignment of steel, but Darwin and a group of loyal employees rout the Trust's hired bullies and get the shipment through.

== Cast ==
- Madlaine Traverse as Esther Regan
- George A. McDaniel as Darwin McAllister
- Edwin B. Tilton as John Regan
- Melbourne MacDowell as Cyrus K. Moulton
- Ben Deeley as Dan Cullen

== Reception ==
Billboard reviewer Marion Russell was very positive towards the film, praising Madlaine Traverse's acting, saying "Miss Traverse is quite in her element as the resourceful business woman, yet never losing her personal feminine charm."

The Film Daily review was mostly negative, calling the iron foundry scenes more interesting than the "poorly handled" story. The reviewer criticized the film for its lack of character development and plot details, no interesting lighting, and "no building with accumulative interest and suspense." The reviewer also found the film's handling of politics to be distasteful, as the film portrays both the I.W.W. and "big business" in a negative light.

The Exhibitor's Herald's review was positive, saying that the conventional plot was executed in a way that was entertaining. The reviewer praised the steel mill scenes for being "instructive and entertaining."

Motion Picture News reviewer Matthew A. Taylor found the film to be built on a "weak foundation" as the story was "not convincing." There were certain scenes that he enjoyed, including the battle for a locomotive and a man's foot trapped by a railroad switch as a train hurtles towards him.

== Bibliography ==
- Solomon, Aubrey. The Fox Film Corporation, 1915-1935. A History and Filmography. McFarland & Co, 2011.
