= Winter Hall =

New Zealand actor (1872–1947)

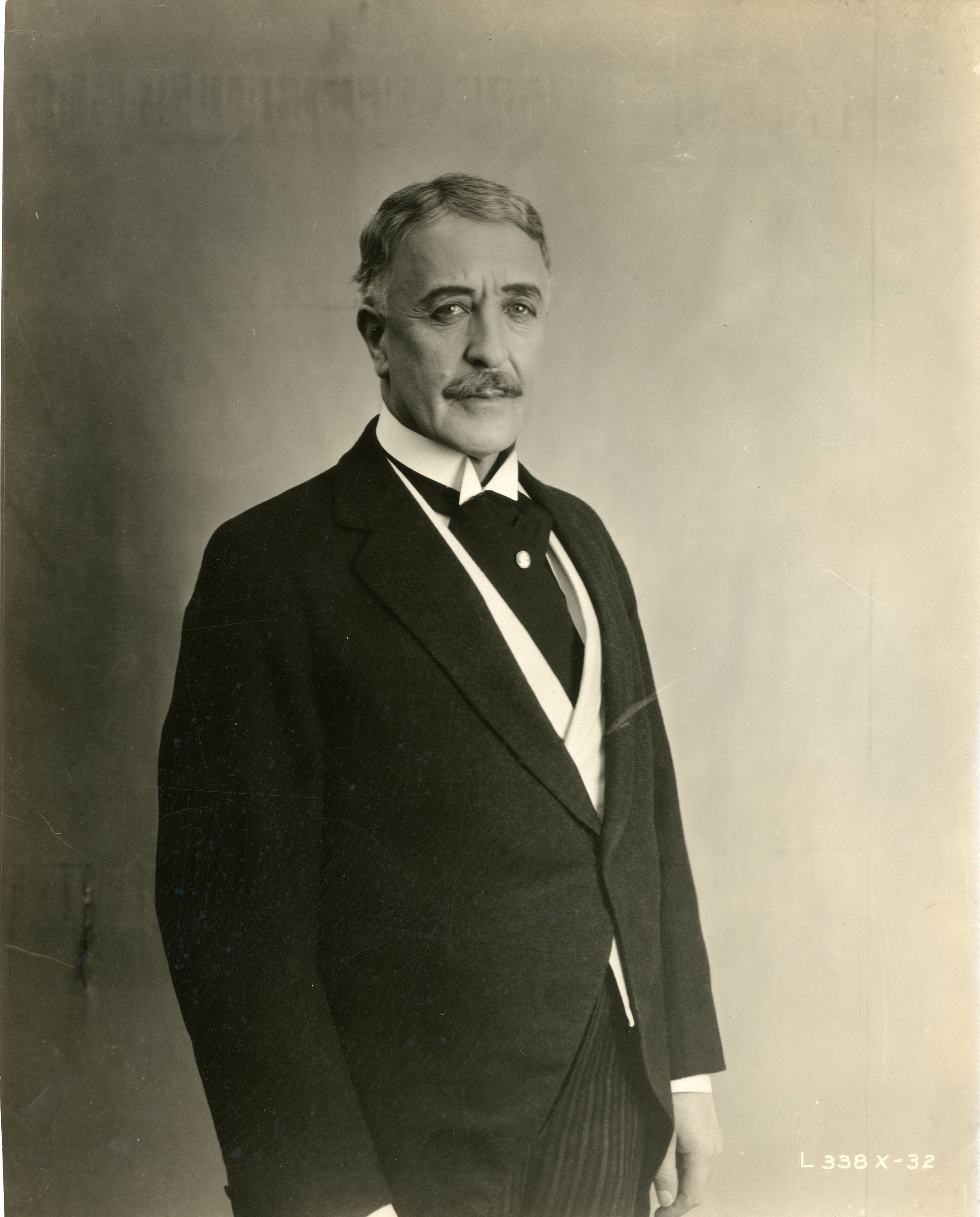
- Hall in 1920
- Born: Winter Amos Hall; 21 June 1872; Christchurch, New Zealand
- Died: 10 February 1947 (aged 74); Los Angeles, California, U.S.
- Occupation: Actor
- Years active: 1916–1938
- Spouse: Katherine Young
- Children: 1

Winter Amos Hall (21 June 1872 – 10 February 1947) was a New Zealand actor of the silent era who later appeared in sound films. He performed in more than 120 films between 1916 and 1938. Prior to that, he had a career as a stage actor in Australia and the United States. In sound films, he was frequently typecast as a clergyman.

== Biography ==
Hall was born in Christchurch, New Zealand, and died in Los Angeles, California. Hall was married to fellow-New Zealander, Katherine Young, a concert pianist. Their Australian-born son, Desmond Winter Hall, was a science fiction writer, magazine editor, and the author of I Give You Oscar Wilde (1965), a novel about the nineteenth century dramatist and wit.

== Filmography ==
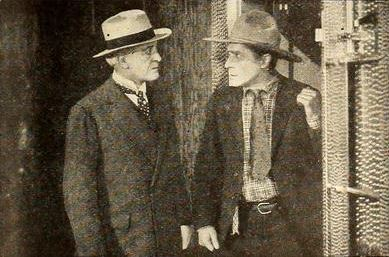
Hall (left) and William S. Hart in The Money Corral, 1919

- The Pioneers (1916) - Dan Farrell (film debut)
- The Joan of Arc of Loos (1916)
- The Gift Girl (1917) - Usun Hassan
- The Bronze Bride (1917) - Mr. Carter
- Sacrifice (1917) - Stephen Stephani
- The Primrose Ring (1917) - Dr. Ralph MacLean
- A Romance of the Redwoods (1917) - John Lawrence, Uncle To Jenny
- The Spindle of Life (1917) - James Bradshaw
- The Cricket (1917) - Pinglet
- The Silent Lady (1917) - Philemon
- My Little Boy (1917) - Uncle Oliver
- New Love for Old (1918) - Ben Sawyer
- The Kaiser, the Beast of Berlin (1918) - Dr.Von Gressler
- Beauty in Chains (1918) - Don Cayetano
- The House of Silence (1918) - Dr. Henry Rogers
- Rich Man, Poor Man (1918)
- The Bravest Way (1918) - Moreby Nason
- Missing (1918) - Dr. Howson
- The Firefly of France (1918) - Dunham
- The City of Dim Faces (1918) - Brand Matthews
- Till I Come Back to You (1918) - King Albert
- The Vanity Pool (1918) - Uncle Penny
- Hitting the High Spots (1918) - Morgan Randolph
- The Squaw Man (1918) - Fletcher
- The Mystery Girl (1918) - Prince Sebasatian
- The Dub (1919) - Burley Hadden
- Alias Mike Moran (1919) - Mr. Vandecar
- The Turn in the Road (1919) - Reverend Matthew Barker
- Captain Kidd, Jr. (1919) - John Brent
- The Money Corral (1919) - Gregory Collins
- For Better, for Worse (1919) - Doctor
- The Red Lantern (1919) - Rev. Alex Templeton
- The Hushed Hour (1919) - Judge Robert
- The Right to Happiness (1919) - Henry Forrester
- Why Smith Left Home (1919) - The General
- When Bearcat Went Dry (1919) - Lone Stacy
- A Girl in Bohemia (1919) - McMain, Publisher
- The Beauty Market (1919) - Ashburton Gaylord
- The Woman Thou Gavest Me (1919)
- The Thirteenth Commandment (1920) - Roger Kip Sr.
- The Tree of Knowledge (1920) - Siur Mostyn Hollingsworth
- The Forbidden Woman (1920) - Edward Harding
- Faith (1920) - Adam Harden
- The Deadlier Sex (1920) - Henry Willard
- Alias Jimmy Valentine (1920) - William Lane
- The Third Woman (1920) - Judson Halliday
- The Woman in His House (1920) - Hilda's Father, Andrew Martin
- Behold My Wife! (1920) - General Armour
- Hearts Are Trumps (1920) - Lord Altcar
- The Jucklins (1921) - General Lundsford
- Forbidden Fruit (1921) - Minor Role (uncredited)
- The Breaking Point (1921) - Dr. Hillyer
- What Every Woman Knows (1921) - Charles Venables
- The Little Clown (1921) - Colonel Beverley
- The Witching Hour (1921) - Judge Prentice
- The Child Thou Gavest Me (1921) - Her Father
- The Affairs of Anatol (1921) - Dr. Johnston (uncredited)
- The Great Impersonation (1921) - Duke of Oxford
- Her Social Value (1921) - Shipley
- Cheated Hearts (1921) - Nathanial Beekman
- Saturday Night (1922) - The Professor
- Burning Sands (1922) - Governor
- On the High Seas (1922) - John Deveraux
- Skin Deep (1922) - Dr. Langdon
- East Is West (1922) - Mr. Benson
- Wasted Lives (1923) - Dr. Wentworth
- The Voice from the Minaret (1923) - Bishop Ellsworth
- Little Church Around the Corner (1923) - Doc
- Ashes of Vengeance (1923) - The Bishop
- Her Reputation (1923) - John Mansfield
- The Day of Faith (1923) - Bland Hendricks
- Thundering Dawn (1923) - The Elder Standish
- Name the Man (1924) - Gov. Stanley
- Secrets (1924) - Dr. Arbuthnot
- The Right of the Strongest (1924) - Austin Lee Sr.
- The Turmoil (1924) - Henry Vertrees
- The Only Woman (1924) - William Brinnsley
- Husbands and Lovers (1924) - Robert Stanton
- The Boomerang (1925) - Gordon
- Raffles, the Amateur Cracksman (1925) - Lord Amersteth
- The Girl Who Wouldn't Work (1925) - District Attorney
- Graustark (1925) - Ambassador
- Compromise (1925) - Joan's Father
- Free to Love (1925) - Judge Orr
- The Pleasure Buyers (1925) - General Ripley
- Ben-Hur (1925) - Joseph
- Paradise (1928) - Rev. Cranston
- The Forger (1928) - John Leith
- After the Verdict (1929) - Lord Dartry
- High Seas (1929) - Lord Bracklethorpe
- Kitty (1929) - John Furnival
- The Wrecker (1929) - Sir Gerald Bartlett
- Woman to Woman (1929) - Dr. Gavron
- The Racketeer (1929) - Mr. Chapman
- The Love Parade (1929) - Priest (uncredited)
- The Lost Zeppelin (1929) - Mr. Wilson
- Road to Paradise (1930) - Brewster - the Butler
- Passion Flower (1930) - Leroy Pringle
- Girls Demand Excitement (1931) - The Dean
- Confessions of a Co-Ed (1931) - Dean Winslow
- Tomorrow and Tomorrow (1932) - President Adee
- The Strange Case of Clara Deane (1932) - Minister (uncredited)
- The Man Called Back (1932) - Judge
- Madame Racketeer (1932) - Minister (uncredited)
- Cavalcade (1933) - Minister on the Pulpit (uncredited)
- The Monkey's Paw (1933) - Mr. Hartigan
- Professional Sweetheart (1933) - Minister (uncredited)
- The World Moves On (1934) - Minister (uncredited)
- The Barretts of Wimpole Street (1934) - Clergyman (uncredited)
- Judge Priest (1934) - Judge Floyd Fairleigh (uncredited)
- British Agent (1934) - Cabinet Member (uncredited)
- The Pursuit of Happiness (1934) - Uncle (uncredited)
- The Merry Widow (1934) - Priest (uncredited)
- What Every Woman Knows (1934) - Cabinet Member (uncredited)
- Mils of the Gods (1934) - Bevins
- Don't Bet on Blondes (1935) - Minister at Wedding (uncredited)
- The Crusades (1935) - Archbishop (uncredited)
- Rendezvous (1935) - Chaplain (uncredited)
- Mutiny on the Bounty (1935) - Chaplain (uncredited)
- A Tale of Two Cities (1935) - Aristocrat (uncredited)
- The Invisible Ray (1936) - Minister (uncredited)
- The Bohemian Girl (1936) - Servant (uncredited)
- Champagne Charlie (1936) - Board Member (uncredited)
- The Crime of Dr. Forbes (1936) - Faculty Doctor (uncredited)
- Mary of Scotland (1936) - Minor Role (uncredited)
- Two in a Crowd (1936) - Judge (uncredited)
- Lloyd's of London (1936) - Dr. Beatty (uncredited)
- Slave Ship (1937) - Minister
- Bulldog Drummond's Revenge (1937) - Ferry Captain (uncredited)
- The Toast of New York (1937) - Board of Directors Member (uncredited)
- Four Men and a Prayer (1938) - Judge
- If I Were King (1938) - Major Domo
