= The City of Tears =

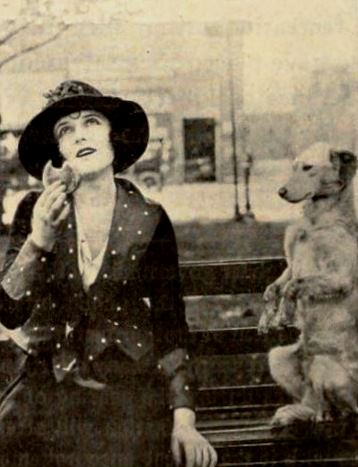
- Directed by: Elsie Jane Wilson
- Written by: Olga Printzlau (scenario, story)
- Produced by: Bluebird Photoplays
- Starring: Carmel Myers; Leatrice Joy
- Cinematography: Alfred Gosden
- Distributed by: Universal Film Manufacturing Company
- Release date: June 29, 1918
- Running time: 5 reels
- Country: United States
- Language: Silent...English titles

The City of Tears is a lost 1918 silent film comedy drama directed by Elsie Jane Wilson and starring Carmel Myers and Leatrice Joy. It was distributed by the Universal Film Manufacturing Company.

== Cast ==
- Carmel Myers - Rosa Carillo
- Edwin August - Tony Bonchi
- Earl Rodney - Billy Leeds (*aka Earle Rodney)
- Leatrice Joy - Maria
- Lottie Kruse - Katrina
