= Mother O' Mine (1917 film) =

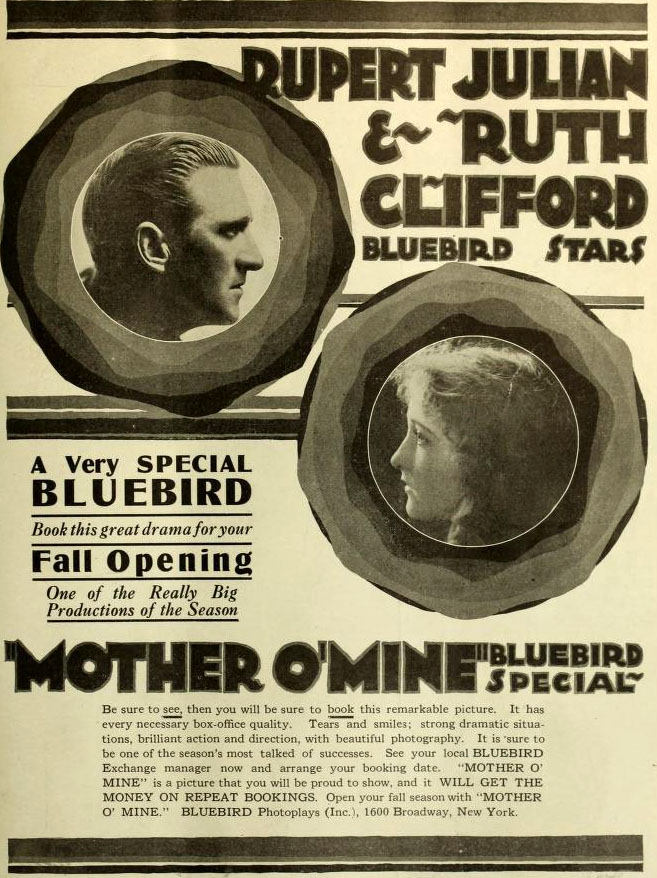
- Directed by: Rupert Julian
- Written by: Elliott J. Clawson; Rupert Julian
- Starring: Rupert Julian; Ruth Clifford; E. Alyn Warren
- Production company: Universal Pictures
- Distributed by: Universal Pictures
- Release date: September 2, 1917
- Running time: 50 minutes
- Country: United States
- Languages: Silent; English intertitles

Mother O' Mine is a 1917 American silent drama film directed by Rupert Julian and starring Julian, Ruth Clifford and E. Alyn Warren.

== Cast ==
- Rupert Julian as John Standing
- Ruth Clifford as Catherine Thurston
- E. Alyn Warren as Romeo Bonelli
- Elsie Jane Wilson as Christine
- Ruby Lafayette as Mrs. Standing

== Bibliography ==
- James Robert Parish & Michael R. Pitts. Film directors: a guide to their American films. Scarecrow Press, 1974.
