= Silent Years =

1921 film

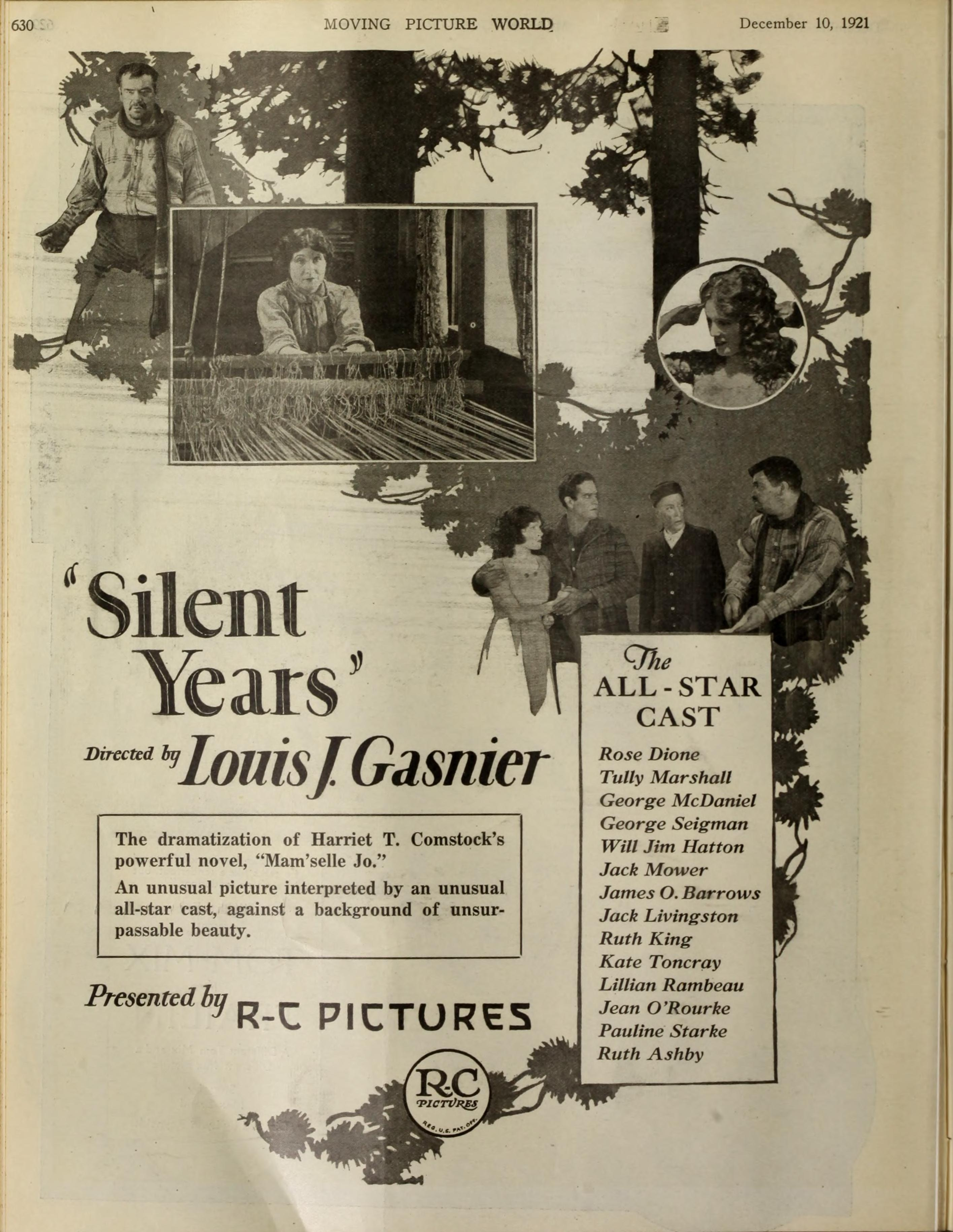
- Directed by: Louis J. Gasnier
- Written by: Harriet T. Comstock (novel); Winifred Dunn; Eve Unsell
- Starring: Rose Dione; Tully Marshall; George A. McDaniel
- Cinematography: Joseph A. Dubray
- Production company: Robertson-Cole Pictures Corporation
- Distributed by: Film Booking Offices of America
- Release date: November 27, 1921
- Running time: 60 minutes
- Country: United States
- Languages: Silent; English intertitles

Silent Years is a 1921 American silent drama film directed by Louis J. Gasnier and starring Rose Dione, Tully Marshall and George A. McDaniel. The film was partly shot on location in Truckee, California.

== Cast ==
- Rose Dione as Mam'selle Jo Morey
- Tully Marshall as Captain Longville
- George A. McDaniel as Henry Langley
- George Siegmann as Pierre Gavot
- Will Jim Hatton as Young Tom Gavot
- Jack Mower as Tom Gavot
- James O. Barrows as Father Mantelle
- Jack Livingston as James Norvall
- Ruth King as Mary Malden
- Kate Toncray as Marcel Longville
- Lillian Rambeau as Mrs. Lindsay
- Jean O'Rourke as Young Donelle
- Ruth Ashby as Mrs. Norval

== Preservation ==
In February of 2021, Silent Years was cited by the National Film Preservation Board on their Lost U.S. Silent Feature Films list and is therefore presumed lost.

== Bibliography ==
- Connelly, Robert B. The Silents: Silent Feature Films, 1910-36, Volume 40, Issue 2. December Press, 1998.
- Munden, Kenneth White. The American Film Institute Catalog of Motion Pictures Produced in the United States, Part 1. University of California Press, 1997.
