= Under a Shadow =

1915 film

- Directed by: Joe De Grasse
- Written by: F. McGrew Willis
- Produced by: Rex Film Co.
- Starring: Lon Chaney; Gretchen Lederer
- Distributed by: Universal Pictures
- Release date: December 5, 1915
- Running time: 2 reels (20 minutes)
- Country: United States
- Language: Silent with English intertitles

Under a Shadow (aka Under The Shadow) is a 1915 American silent drama film directed by Joe De Grasse and featuring Lon Chaney. It was written by F. McGrew Willis, based on a story he wrote entitled "A Secret Service Affair". The film is today considered to be lost.

== Plot ==
Thera Dufre, a former foreign secret service agent, now hiding from government agents, receives a letter ordering her to deliver a sealed packet to a specific location to Mr. DeSerris. DeSerris waits at the appointed place when a woman named Alice Irving, who bears a striking resemblance to Thera, passes by and is confronted by DeSerris who mistakes her for the secret agent. Alice escapes, but her jealous husband Mr. Irving sees DeSerris following Alice. When Alice tells him she has no idea who the man is, he refuses to believe her.

Later DeSerris confronts Alice again as she tries to enter her house, and orders her to turn over the packet. Mr. Irving sees them and confronts DeSerris with a pistol. Alice tries to grab the gun, and in the ensuing struggle, Alice's daughter is shot. Thera Dufre, who realizes that DeSerris has mistaken Alice for her, sees this as her chance to escape, but she is struck by the Irving's car as they attempt to rush their wounded child to a hospital. Mr. Irving sends her back to his house with the butler, and is struck by the uncanny resemblance of the woman to his wife.

Thera hides when Alice enters, and once again DeSerris breaks in and mistakenly attacks the innocent Alice. Thera shoots DeSerris dead, and after Alice faints, Thera places the revolver next to the unconscious Alice. Thera plans to frame Alice for the murder of DeSerris when suddenly the phone rings. She answers the phone and it is Alice's husband and, thinking he is speaking to Alice, he tells her that their daughter will recover and begs her to forgive him for being so jealous. Realizing that Alice's family would be destroyed if she framed her for the murder, Thera calmly decides to remain at the murder scene and accept the blame when the police arrive.

== Cast ==
- Gretchen Lederer as dual role as both Thera Dufre and as Alice Irving
- Lon Chaney as DeSerris
- Arthur Shirley as Mr. Irving (Alice's husband)
- Millard K. Wilson as Foreign Agent

== Reception ==
"A fair melodrama that contains as its strong point much exciting action. In fact the action causes one to disregard some of the unconvincing situations...The double exposure scenes are not very well handled." --- Motion Picture News
