= The Star Prince =

- Directed by: Madeline Brandeis
- Written by: Madeline Brandeis
- Produced by: Courtland J. Van Deusen
- Starring: Zoe Rae; Dorphia Brown; John Dorland; Edith Rothschild; Marjorie Claire Bowden; Gulnar Kheiralla
- Production company: Little Players Film Company
- Distributed by: Wholesome Films Corp.
- Release date: June 1918
- Running time: 59 minutes
- Country: United States
- Language: Silent (English intertitles)

The Star Prince (also known as Twinkle Twinkle Little Star) is a 1918 American silent fantasy film directed and written by Madeline Brandeis, and starring Zoe Rae and Dorphia Brown. The film was produced by the Little Players Film Company.

When shown the film as a nonagenarian, Rae dismissed her performance by exclaiming, "What a ham!"

== Plot ==
The Star Prince (1918)

Opening with an excerpt from the English lullaby "Twinkle, Twinkle, Little Star", a nameless woodcutter is on his way home one night when he sees a star fall from the sky; he goes to investigate and finds an infant child, the Star Prince. The woodcutter brings the child home, raising him among his own. Seven years later, the Prince has grown to be a spoiled brat who believes himself superior to everyone else. One morning, he and his siblings assault a passing old beggar woman, but the woodcutter intervenes.

The woman, ushered inside for safety, reveals that she was beset by muggers seven years earlier, and she hid her newborn, the Star Prince, to protect him. The Prince, however, is furious to learn that the beggar is his mother. He rejects her, and she leaves, upset. A witnessing fairy places a curse on him, making him physically ugly. The Prince is ridiculed and unrecognized by his adoptive family. He decides to journey into the woods to search for his mother to ask for forgiveness.

Somewhere, in a nearby castle, a fairy godmother tells a beautiful young princess that she will marry a prince who fell from a star. While traveling, the Prince happens upon a trapped squirrel. His act of kindness freeing the animal earns him his beauty from the fairy. The Prince also finds a lost dog and brings it home to a grateful Princess.

A wicked dwarf takes the Prince to a cave in hopes of keeping him away from the Princess, with the help of his mother, the Witch. The dwarf asks the King for the Princess' hand in marriage, claiming to be the Star Prince. She is outraged to learn she has become betrothed and realizes that the boy she encountered was the Star Prince. She sends a carrier pigeon to the Prince in hopes of rescue. The Prince receives the note that tells him that if he touches a magic rock in the cave, he will be free.

The Prince does so and returns to the castle, while being watched by the spy. The Princess is overjoyed to see him but the Witch summons her imps to capture the Prince. The imps invade the castle as the Prince hides in the Princess' closet. Once discovered, the Prince fights the dwarf before being picked up and taken away. Back in the cave, the Prince is forced by the Witch to fetch a bag of gold in the forest. The Prince meets the squirrel he once saved, and the squirrel offers to retrieve the gold.

On his way back to the cave, the Prince meets an old beggar who asks for the money. The Prince gives it to him and receives punishment from the Witch. That night, the Prince makes a daring escape, fleeing through the Enchanted Forest. The next morning, the wedding is about to take place. The Witch has a vision of the Prince interfering with the ceremony and rushes to the castle. The Star Prince arrives in time to stop the vows. The Witch is killed by castle guards.

The dwarf is changed into a pig. The Prince tells the Princess he cannot marry her until he has his mother's forgiveness. At that moment, she arrives with the other beggar. The Prince begs for forgiveness and his mother grants his wish. The fairy godmother bestows gorgeously tailored outfits, and explains that the man whom the Prince gave the gold to was, in fact, his father. The Prince and Princess are wed, and all live happily ever after.

== Cast ==
- Zoe Rae as The Star Prince
- Dorphia Brown as Princess
- John Dorland as dwarf
- Edith Rothschild as beggar woman
- Marjorie Claire Bowden as witch
- Gulnar Kheiralla as fairy godmother
