= Hungry Eyes (film) =

1918 film

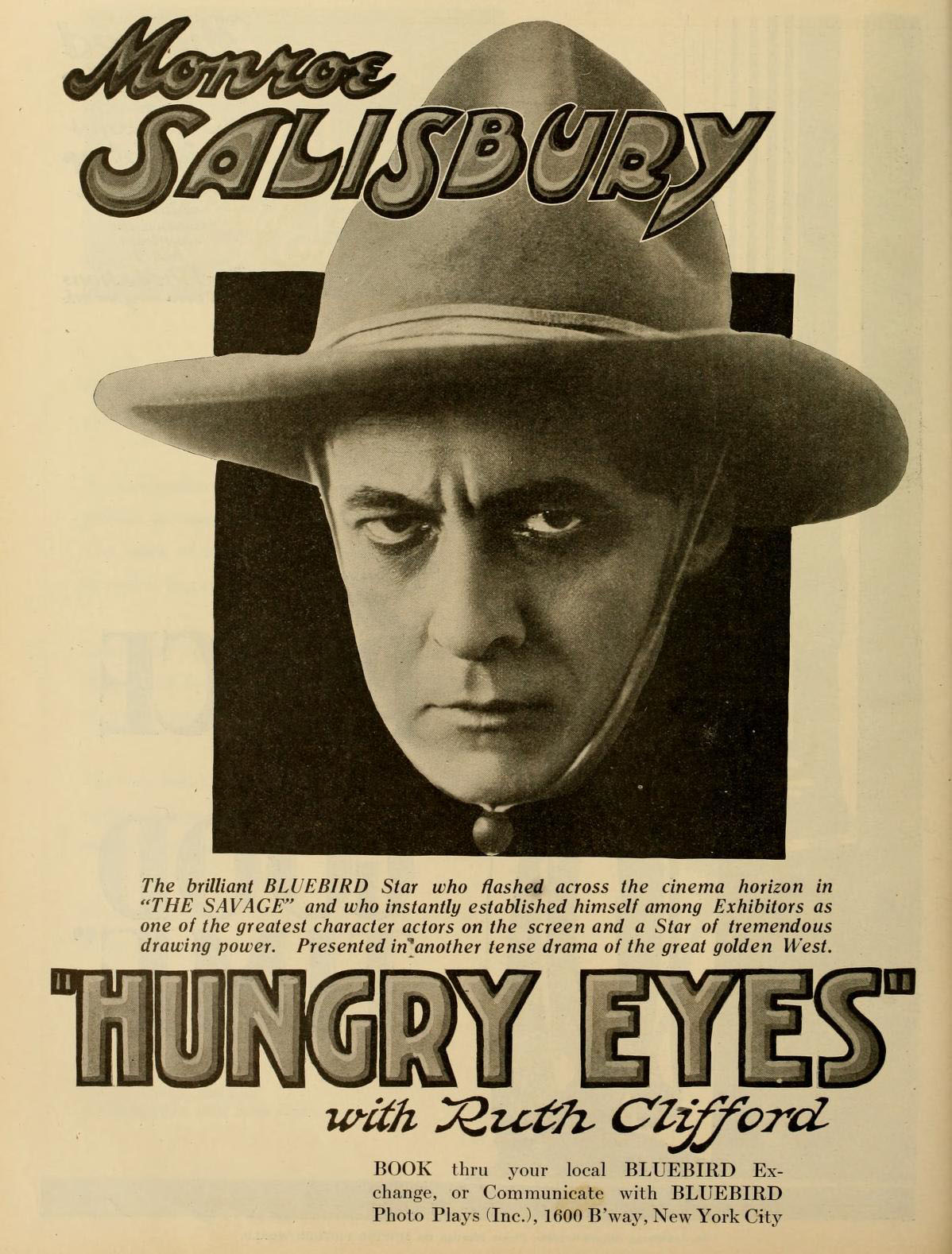
- Directed by: Rupert Julian
- Written by: Elliott J. Clawson (novel)
- Starring: Monroe Salisbury; Ruth Clifford; Gretchen Lederer
- Cinematography: Edward A. Kull
- Production company: Universal Pictures
- Distributed by: Universal Pictures
- Release date: March 11, 1918
- Running time: 50 minutes
- Country: United States
- Languages: Silent; English intertitles

Hungry Eyes is a 1918 American silent Western film directed by Rupert Julian and starring Monroe Salisbury, Ruth Clifford and Gretchen Lederer.

== Cast ==
- Rupert Julian as John Silver
- Monroe Salisbury as Dale Revenal
- Ruth Clifford as Mary Jane Appleton
- W.H. Bainbridge as Dudley Appleton
- Henry A. Barrows as Jack Nelda
- Arthur Tavares as Scotty
- Gretchen Lederer as Bessie Dupont
- George A. McDaniel as Pinto Dupont
- Rita Pickering as Nellie

== Bibliography ==
- James Robert Parish & Michael R. Pitts. Film directors: a guide to their American films. Scarecrow Press, 1974.
