= Unclaimed Goods =

1918 film

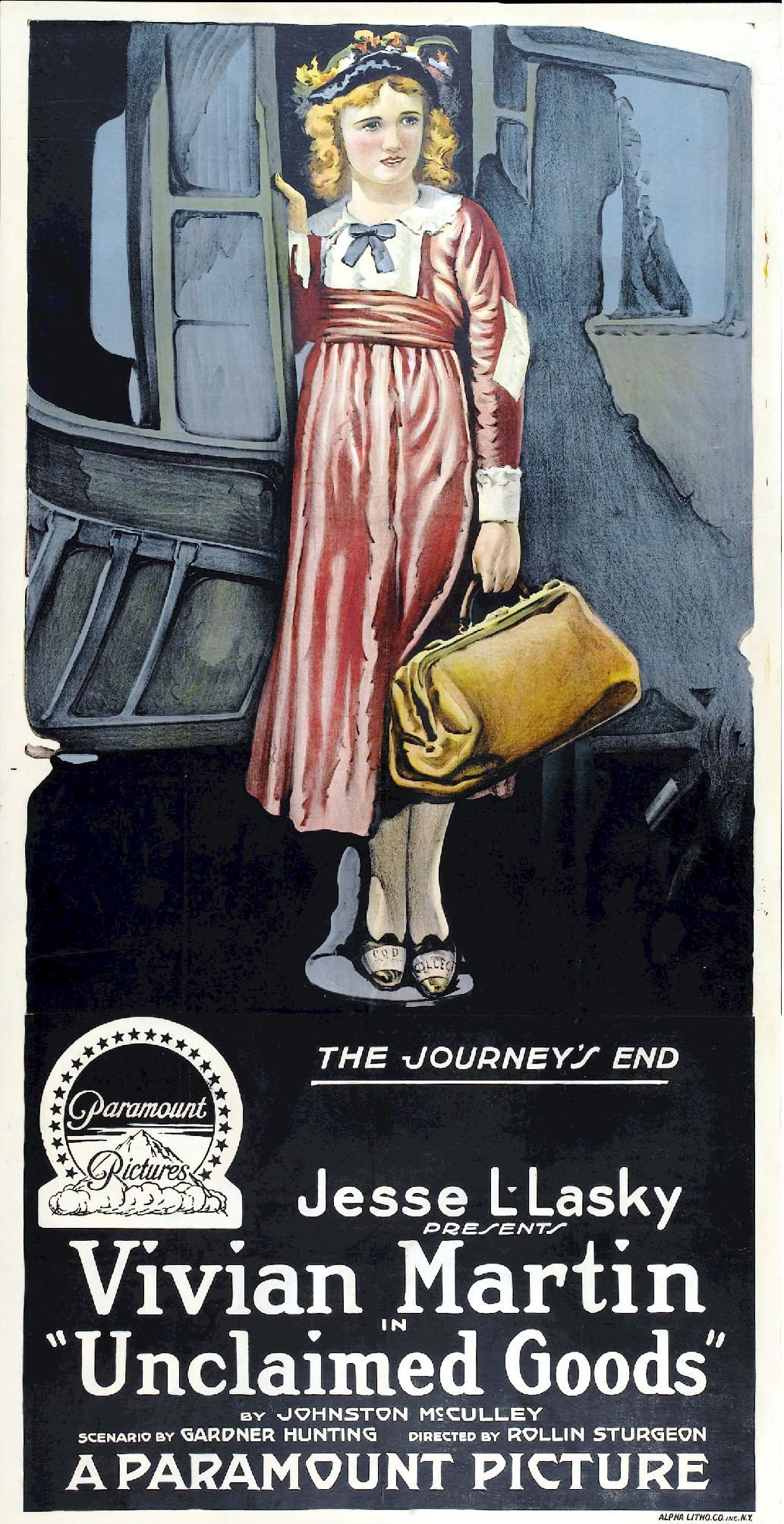
- Theatrical poster
- Directed by: Rollin S. Sturgeon
- Screenplay by: Gardner Hunting; Johnston McCulley
- Produced by: Jesse L. Lasky
- Starring: Vivian Martin; Harrison Ford; Casson Ferguson; George A. McDaniel; Dick La Reno; George Kunkel
- Cinematography: James Van Trees
- Production company: Famous Players–Lasky Corporation
- Distributed by: Paramount Pictures
- Release date: April 14, 1918
- Running time: 50 minutes
- Country: United States
- Languages: Silent; English intertitles

Unclaimed Goods is a 1918 American silent Western comedy film directed by Rollin S. Sturgeon and written by Gardner Hunting and Johnston McCulley. The film stars Vivian Martin, Harrison Ford, Casson Ferguson, George A. McDaniel, Dick La Reno, and George Kunkel. The film was released on April 14, 1918, by Paramount Pictures. It is not known whether the film currently survives.

== Plot ==
A Wells Fargo & Co. express agent has to determine what to do with an unusual shipment that has arrived at his office. The girl's father is being held prisoner by the villain, who is making a claim for the girl. The agent saves the day and claims the "goods" for himself.

== Cast ==
- Vivian Martin as Betsey Burke
- Harrison Ford as Danny Donegan
- Casson Ferguson as Cocopah Kid
- George A. McDaniel as 'Gentleman Joe' Slade (credited as George McDaniel)
- Dick La Reno as Sheriff Bill Burke
- George Kunkel as Uncle "Place Jim" Murphy
- Carmen Phillips as Idaho Ina
- Anne Schaefer as Mrs. Ryal (credited as Ann Schaefer)

== Reception ==
Like many American films of the time, Unclaimed Goods was subject to cuts by city and state film censorship boards. For example, the Chicago Board of Censors conducted two reviews and required cuts, in Reel 1, of the first train scene showing the "Cocopah Kid" robbing the express messenger with gun, Reel 2, two scenes in saloon showing young woman plying Cocopah Kid with drink, the intertitle "Go on back — you got him hooked", two scenes of Slade in saloon threatening Burke with gun, first long and three gambling scenes to include cheating, Slade shooting Cocopah Kid, two scenes of Slade and gang forcing Murphy towards saloon at point of gun, Slade's men searching man's pocket for gun, three scenes of young women at bar in saloon, scene of young woman in foreground with slit skirt, Reel 4, the intertitle "So the auction thing goes and the maverick will belong to me", flash scene of young woman in low cut gown standing near men, Cocopah Kid threatening and shooting messenger, express agent slugging guard, Reel 5, five saloon scenes with women at bar, woman in background drinking, saloon scene of Slade holding up Cocopah Kid and shooting him, Slade falling outside saloon door after being shot, entire scene of Burke on road shooting guard and guard falling, and three scenes of gang shooting at Burke.
