= George A. McDaniel =

American actor (1885–144)

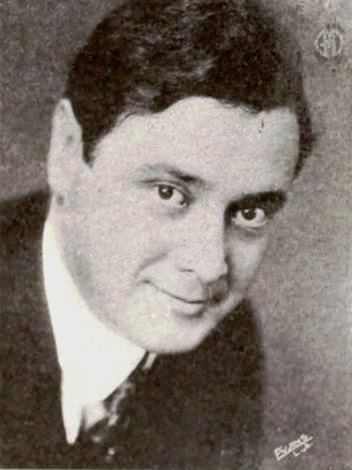
- George A. McDaniel in 1919 Exhibitors Herald issue
- Born: George Alexander McDaniel; December 22, 1885; Atlanta, Georgia, U.S.
- Died: August 20, 1944 (aged 58); San Fernando, California, U.S.
- Occupations: Actor, singer
- Years active: 1915–1923

George A. McDaniel (December 22, 1885 – August 20, 1944) was an American silent film actor and singer.

He was born on December 22, 1885, in Atlanta, Georgia, and died on August 20, 1944, in San Fernando, California. He appeared on total of 27 films.

== Filmography ==
- Graft (1915)
- The Girl and the Game (1916) - Robert Segrue
- The Final Conquest (1916) - Captain Hicks
- The Hidden Children (1917) - Amochol
- A Little Princess (1917) - Ram Dass
- The Door Between (1917) - Archibald Crocker
- Hell's Crater (1918)
- The Shuttle (1918) - Sir Nigel Anstruthers
- Hungry Eyes (1918) - Pinto Dupont
- Beauty in Chains (1918) - Caballuco
- Unclaimed Goods (1918) - 'Gentleman Joe' Slade
- Shark Monroe (1918) - Webster Hilton
- The Man from Funeral Range (1918) - Mark Brenton
- The She-Devil (1918) - The Tiger
- The Shepherd of the Hills (1919) - Young Matt
- Pretty Smooth (1919) - Mr. Hanson
- The Woman Under Cover (1919) - Mac
- Lombardi, Ltd. (1919) - Riccardo 'Ricky' Tosello
- Lost Money (1919) - Ox Lanyon
- What Would You Do? (1920) - Hugh Chilson
- The Iron Heart (1920) - Darwin McAllister
- Two Kinds of Love (1920) - Mason
- Silent Years (1921) - Henry Langley
- Cameron of the Royal Mounted (1921)
- The Scrapper (1922) - McGuirk
- Burning Words (1923) - Mounted-Police Sergeant Chase
- The Barefoot Boy (1923) - Rodman Grant
