= Hearts in Conflict =

- Directed by: Edward LeSaint
- Produced by: Carl Laemmle; Independent Moving Pictures
- Starring: Harry A. Pollard; Margarita Fischer; Gretchen Lederer; Gertrude Short; William Bertram
- Distributed by: Motion Picture Distributors and Sales Company
- Release date: July 15, 1912
- Running time: 300 m (1 reel)
- Country: United States
- Languages: Silent; English intertitles

Hearts in Conflict is a 1912 American romantic drama film directed by Edward LeSaint. It was produced by the Independent Moving Pictures (IMP) Company of New York.

== Cast ==
- Harry A. Pollard - Ralph
- Margarita Fischer - Angelina
- Gretchen Lederer - Elinor
- Gordon Sackville - Andrew
- Gertrude Short - Jeanne
- William Bertram - David
