= Madeline Brandeis =

American film producer

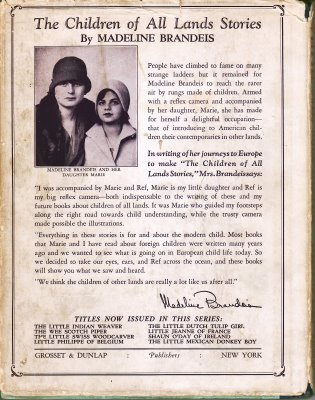
Madeline Brandeis and her daughter Marie

Madeline Frank Brandeis (December 18, 1897 – June 28, 1937) was an American writer of children's books, a film producer and director.

== Biography ==
Brandeis was born as Madeline Frank in San Francisco.

Brandeis was best known for her "Children of America" and "Children of All Lands" series of books. Most of the fictional stories included photographs taken by the writer, with child actors as the books' characters.

She was also a founder of The Little Players' Film Co., with offices in New York City and Chicago, which featured casts composed almost entirely of children. She wrote, directed, and financed her first feature film The Star Prince (1918), released in 1920 as Twinkle Twinkle Little Star. She produced and directed the film series Children of All Lands (1928/29), The Little Dutch Tulip Girl (1928/29), The Little Indian Weaver, and The Little Swiss Wood-Carver.

In 1918, she married E. (Erving) John Brandeis, of Omaha's Brandeis department stores. They divorced on 24 April 1921, at which point she was living in Beverly Hills; she received a US$400,000 settlement. She died in Gallup, New Mexico, of injuries suffered in an automobile accident two weeks earlier while she and her daughter Marie (b. 1920) were driving from New York to Los Angeles.

== Bibliography ==
- The Little Indian Weaver (1928), Grosset & Dunlap, 134 pages
- Shaun O'Day of Ireland (1929)
- The Wee Scotch Piper (1929)
- Little Jeanne of France (1929)
- The Little Swiss Wood Carver (1929)
- The Little Dutch Tulip Girl (1929)
- Little Philippe of Belgium (1930)
- Little Anne of Canada (1931)
- The Little Mexican Donkey Boy (1931)
- Jack of the Circus (1931)
- The All Wrong Book (1932)
- Yankee Doodle's Adventures (1932)
- Carmen of the Golden Coast (1933) +
- Mitz and Fritz of Germany (1933)
- Little Tony of Italy (1934)
- Little Tom of England (1935)
- Little Rose of the Mesa (1935) +
- Little John of New England (1936) +
- The Little Spanish Dancer (1936)
- Little Farmer of the Middle West (1937) +
- Adventure in Hollywood (1937)
- Little Erik of Sweden (1938)

+ Works whose U.S. copyrights were renewed.
