= The Leatherneck =

1929 film

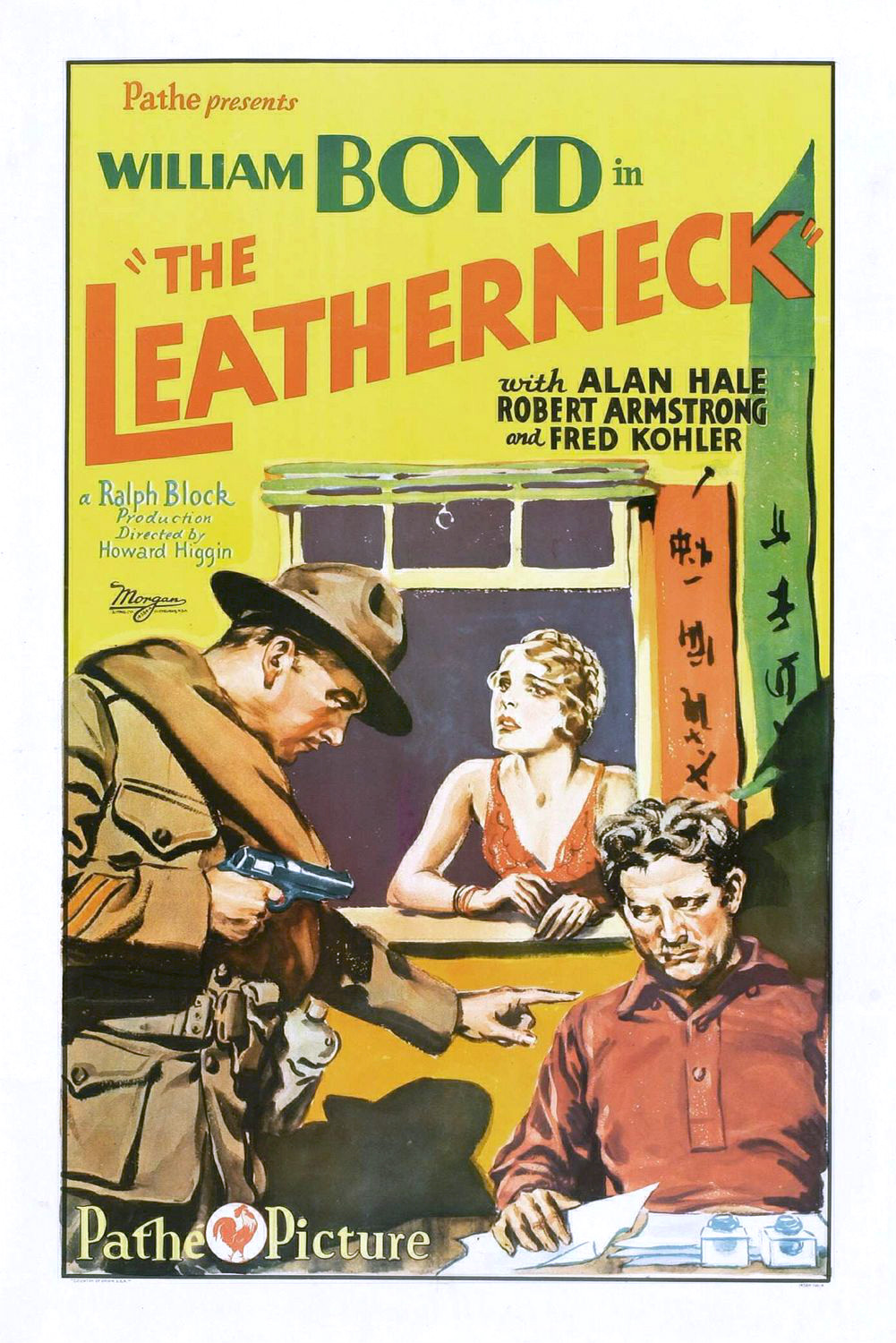
- Original film poster
- Directed by: Howard Higgin
- Written by: Elliott J. Clawson; John W. Krafft
- Starring: William Boyd
- Cinematography: John J. Mescall
- Distributed by: Pathé Exchange
- Release date: February 24, 1929
- Running time: 65 minutes
- Country: United States
- Languages: Sound (Part-Talkie); English Intertitles

The Leatherneck is a 1929 American sound part-talkie drama film directed by Howard Higgin. In addition to sequences with audible dialogue or talking sequences, the film features a synchronized musical score and sound effects along with English intertitles. At the 2nd Academy Awards in 1930, Elliott J. Clawson was nominated for an Academy Award in the category Best Writing (Adapted Screenplay). Prints of the film exist in the archives of the Library of Congress and at the George Eastman Museum.

== Plot ==
At the headquarters of the 6th Regiment of the United States Marines in Tientsin, China, unease runs high. Three men—Privates William “Tex” Calhoun, Joseph “Buddy” Hanlon, and Otto “Fuzzy” Schmidt—have disappeared without explanation. Captain Brand, the hardboiled but good-hearted officer in charge, shakes his head. “I wouldn’t put anything past those three eggs,” he growls, “except deserting the outfit.” His doubts are challenged when the missing men suddenly reappear. Tex staggers into the barracks, carrying the lifeless body of Buddy on his back. Fuzzy follows him, dazed and broken, staring with vacant eyes, while Tex himself collapses from exhaustion.

Soon after, Tex is brought before a court martial to explain his disappearance. On the witness stand, he begins to tell the story that led them there. His tale begins in France, not long after the Armistice. While guarding German prisoners, Tex met Otto Schmidt—nicknamed “Fuzzy.” A grand brawl with the military police threw Tex, Buddy, and Fuzzy together, and in the heat of that scuffle a lifelong friendship was born. Fuzzy, once an enemy soldier, proved himself so loyal that he later joined the Marines alongside his American companions.

The trio’s adventures carried them far from Europe, into the turbulent chaos of Vladivostok, where American troops were stationed during the Russian Revolution. There they met Captain Heckla, who introduced himself as a Chilean officer. Smooth and ingratiating, Heckla introduced the Marines to Petrovitch, an old Russian émigré, and his children—an earnest young son and a daughter named Tanya. Tanya’s beauty and gentleness struck Tex at once, and though at first his two comrades flirted with her as well, it was clear soon enough that her heart belonged to Tex, and Buddy and Fuzzy gracefully stepped aside.

As Tex courted Tanya, Heckla insinuated himself into Petrovitch’s household, learning of the family’s valuable potash property on the Sungari River in Manchuria. Eventually, Heckla proposed that Tex and his friends join him in raising a private army to seize the land. Outraged at this treachery, the three Marines beat him soundly, earning a dangerous enemy. For a time he faded from sight, while Tex’s romance with Tanya blossomed. Their wedding was arranged, and in a small Russian chapel Tanya was married in her mother’s bridal gown. The ceremony was moving and solemn, with Petrovitch weeping at the sight of his daughter clothed in his wife’s memory.

But that same night, tragedy struck. While Tex was on patrol duty, Heckla rose to power among the revolutionaries and unleashed a massacre of refugees. Petrovitch and his son were slaughtered. A dying servant gasped that Tanya had been carried away by Heckla’s men. Grief-stricken and furious, Tex, Buddy, and Fuzzy swore vengeance, but no trace of her or Heckla could be found. Soon afterward, the regiment was transferred to China, and the search was abandoned.

In Tientsin, Buddy and Fuzzy stumbled upon a newspaper advertisement announcing the sale of stock in the Heckla Potash Company on the Sungari River. Realizing their enemy was still alive and scheming, they concealed the discovery from Tex. Fuzzy slipped away alone to confront Heckla, and when he failed to return, Buddy followed, leaving behind only a note scrawled across the advertisement: I’ve gone after Fuzzy.

Tex finally traced them to Heckla’s hideout at the potash works. There he found Heckla slumped dead in a chair, Buddy lying mortally wounded on the floor, and Fuzzy in a chamber of horrors—bound against a wall beneath a pipe that dripped water relentlessly onto his head until his mind broke under the torture. Buddy used his last breaths to guide Tex to his suffering friend, and soon afterward died in Tex’s arms.

Tex gathered the shattered Fuzzy and set out across the blistering desert with Buddy’s body. Fuzzy followed like a lost child, his mind gone, while Tex carried his dying comrade until they reached a Chinese riverboat. Buddy died aboard, leaving only Tex and Fuzzy alive.

When Tex finished his testimony before the court, the presiding colonel scoffed at his story. With no corroborating evidence, the jury found him guilty of desertion. Captain Brand protested in vain—until a sudden cry rang out. Fuzzy, standing by the window, shouted “Tanya!” as though something deep within him had snapped back into place. At that moment, Tanya herself was found outside the barracks and brought in to testify.

She told the court how Heckla had deceived her, promising to take her to safety with her father and brother, but instead abducting her into the desert. By night she escaped and, after great suffering, reached Kiang-Ho. From there she made her way to Tientsin in search of the Americans. Her story confirmed every word Tex had spoken.

The court, bound by regulations, still found Tex guilty of absence without leave, but the punishment was light—three days confined to barracks. Captain Brand grinned knowingly that those three days would seem like much longer, since Tanya would be waiting for Tex the entire time.

And so the tale ended: with Tex reunited with Tanya, Fuzzy standing at his side though his mind bore scars, and the memory of Buddy honored as the friend who gave his life in their adventure.

== Cast ==
- William Boyd as Pvt William "Tex" Calhoun
- Alan Hale as Pvt Otto "Fuzzy" Schmidt
- Robert Armstrong as Pvt Joseph "Buddy" Hanlon
- Fred Kohler as Captain Heckla
- Diane Ellis as Tanya
- Jimmy Aldine as Tanya's brother (as James Aldine)
- Paul Weigel as Petrovitch
- Jules Cowles as Cook
- Wade Boteler as Gunnery Sergeant
- Jack Richardson as Captain Brand
- Joseph W. Girard as the Colonel

== Music ==
The film featured a theme song entitled "Only For You" which was composed by Josiah Zuro, Francis Gromon and Charles Weinberg.

== See also ==
- List of early sound feature films (1926–1929)
