= Bound on the Wheel =

1915 film

- Directed by: Joe De Grasse
- Written by: Ida May Park (screenplay); Jules Furthman (story)
- Produced by: Rex Motion Picture Co.
- Starring: Lon Chaney; Elsie Jane Wilson
- Distributed by: Universal Film Manufacturing Company
- Release date: July 25, 1915
- Running time: 3 reels (approximately 30 minutes)
- Country: United States
- Languages: Silent; English intertitles

Bound on the Wheel is a 1915 American short silent drama film directed by Joe De Grasse and featuring Lon Chaney. It was written by Ida May Park (De Grasse's wife), based on a story by Jules Furthman. The film is now presumed lost.

== Plot ==
Bound on the Wheel was a three act feature. The film is set in the east-side tenements of New York City. Elsie Jane Wilson plays the "embittered" Cora Gertz who lives in a tenement room with her parents, and Lon Chaney plays Tom Coulahan, a "drink-numbed 'good-for-nothing'" who lives on the floor below them with his alcoholic parents. Tom wants to take Cora away with him to live in a place of their own, but his parents create such a fuss that after they are married, Cora agrees to stay in the same building and live with Tom and his parents.

Soon after, Cora's parents return to live in Germany and Tom's father dies. Mrs. Coulahan and Cora are forced to take in washing, while Tom devolves into a drunken lout. When Mrs. Coulahan dies, the entire burden of the household is now on Cora's shoulders. Hans, a family friend from Germany, tells Cora that he is looking for a good investment for his life's savings. Tom plots to steal the thick bankroll Hans is carrying.

Tom tries to bully Cora into helping him steal Hans' money, but Cora warns Hans of Tom's plot. Meanwhile, a drunken Tom accidentally mistakes a bottle of poison for his booze and drinks it. Cora finds her husband dead, and she and Hans are now free to marry.

== Cast ==
- Elsie Jane Wilson as Cora Gertz
- Lon Chaney as Tom Coulahan
- Lydia Yeamans Titus as Mrs. Coulahan (Tom's mother)
- Arthur Shirley as Hans
- George Berrell
- Lule Warrenton as Mrs. Gertz (Cora's mother)
- Thomas Webster

== Reception ==
"A strong drama that goes right to the point without any consideration for delicacy...This is produced very well, with much attention being paid to the atmosphere of the tenement district. Lon Chaney as the husband does some excellent character work." --- Motion Picture News

"Every moment is full of action, suspense, heart interest and thrills. A true to life drama that will hold your keenest interest from start to finish." --- Motion Picture Weekly

The Modesto Evening News described the film as a "close and accurate study of life in the poor district of a large city, and like an Ibsen drama it looks squarely at life, omitting none of the sordid details.
