= Elsie Jane Wilson =

Australian film director

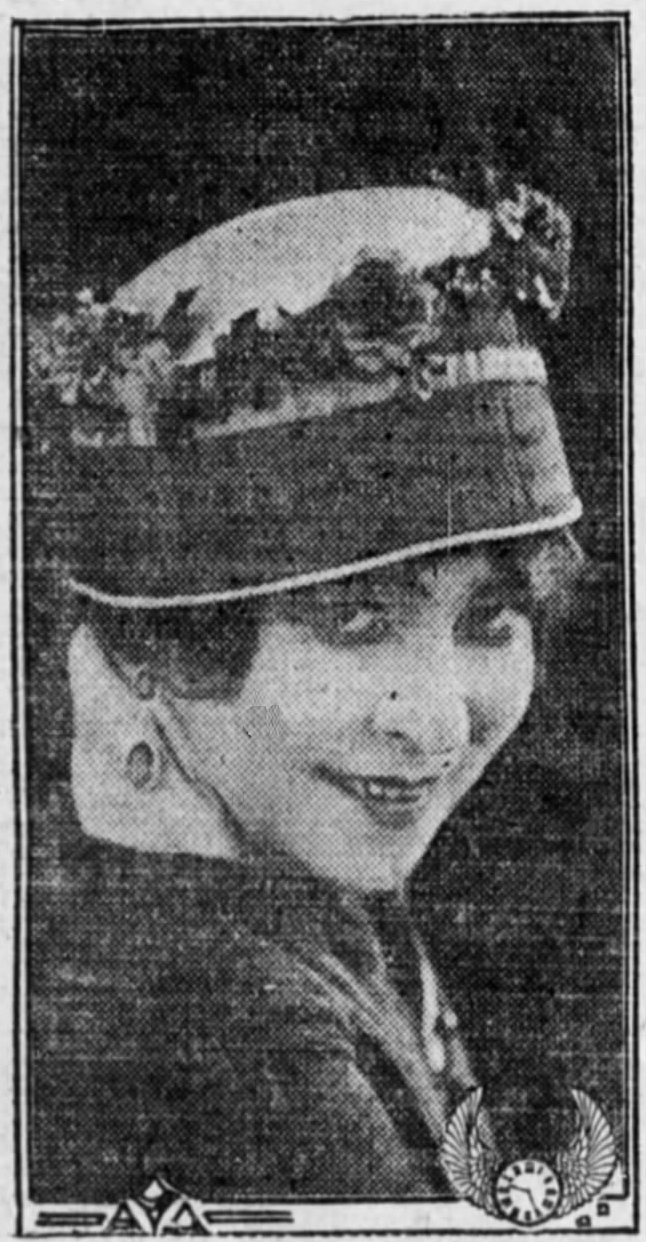
- Wilson in The Lure of the Mask, 1915
- Born: November 7, 1885; Sydney, Australia
- Died: January 16, 1965 (aged 79); Los Angeles, California, U.S.
- Resting place: Forest Lawn Memorial Park, Glendale, California
- Occupations: Actress; Director
- Spouse: Rupert Julian (m. 1906; died 1943)

Elsie Jane Wilson (7 November 1885 – 16 January 1965) was an actress, director, and writer during the early silent era of filmmaking. She starred in over thirty films. Between 1916 and 1919, Wilson was credited for writing two films, producing two films, and directing eleven films. She was best known in the genres of drama and comedy dramas.

== Biography ==
Elsie Jane Wilson was born in Sydney, Australia. It was claimed she began her career as a professional actress at the age of two. She credited her success as an actress to early participation in an English Christmas Pantomime every year, allowing her to gain training and experience.

Wilson acted in London, South Africa, and later in the United States. She toured Australia and New Zealand with a number of J. C. Williamson companies, where she met actor Rupert Julian, whom she married in 1906. They immigrated to New York, United States in 1911 and found work as actors on stage. In 1912, Wilson toured in A Fool There Was, followed by Everywoman.

== Film career ==
After several years on stage, in 1913 Wilson and Julian began working with Universal Studios’ subsidiary the Rex Company. Wilson starred in several films that co-starred Julian. The couple turned to directing, with Wilson sometimes functioning as Julian's assistant or co-director. At first she received little credit for her work. Wilson also noted that she and her husband had different ideas about filmmaking - which made it difficult for them to discuss their work.

Wilson continued to act at this time, and she appeared in Oliver Twist (1916) and other Paramount films. It was noted by The Pittsburg Press that her role in Temptation was a "pronounced success". In 1917 she returned to Universal and started her directorial career, mainly in light comedies. She started her solo director career with The Little Pirate featuring child actor Zoe Rae, which was released on September 10, 1917.

According to reviews of the day, Wilson was a modest filmmaker, being best appreciated for eliciting good performances from otherwise indifferent talent. Her work was seen as artistic, enjoyable and popular in the film industry. Wilson featured many female roles in her films and these tended to appeal to child and female audiences. When writer Frances Denton of Photoplay visited Universal Studios in 1918, she described the work that Wilson was creating as "sob stuff" and Wilson was noted as one of the female directors at Universal who created films centering around children. The Game's Up, released in 1919, marked the end of Wilson's directing career.

== Universal in the 1910s ==
Historians note Universal Studios for their feminist politics. Elsie Jane Wilson's case exemplifies how genre and gender, up until 1918, worked together to establish the institution's division of labor. Work and genres became gendered because the institution thought of gender in a particular manner. During this time, Universal was more hierarchal than collaborative. Magazines such as Moving Picture World began to identify such films as "woman’s features", including Wilson's solo-directed films. This era also increasingly saw women excluded from the director's chair.

== Contribution to cinema ==
Early press reports established her as being in the "front rank" of directors. Nevertheless, few women directors sustained careers in the 1920s. Actors on Julian's pictures later commented on how she came to set every day, often lightening the mood with jokes at Julian's expense to relieve tension.

In 1917, Wilson began advertising for members to take part in a café scene for her film “The Game’s Up”. During the same time period, the Board of Health shut down many Los Angeles restaurants due to an influenza epidemic, leaving cabaret showgirls out of work. Wilson and Universal were confronted by a mob of showgirls trying to take part in her film.

Moving Pictures World, a weekly film industry periodical, often published on Wilson and her efforts in the silent film era. The Moving Picture Weekly recorded Wilson as Bluebird's noted woman producer. Her work played upon gender roles.

== Death ==
Wilson survived her husband, who died in 1943. Wilson died in 1965 in Los Angeles, California, at age 79, and was buried in the Forest Lawn Memorial Park Cemetery in Glendale, California, beside her husband.

== Selected filmography ==
- Bound on the Wheel (1915)
- Mountain Justice (1915)
- Temptation (1915)
- Oliver Twist (1916)
- The Mystery Ship (1917)
- The Little Pirate (1917)
- The Cricket (1917)
- The Silent Lady (1917)
- Mother O' Mine (1917)
- The Circus of Life (1917)
- The City of Tears (1918)
- The Dream Lady (1918)
- New Love For Old (1918)
