= The Silent Lady =

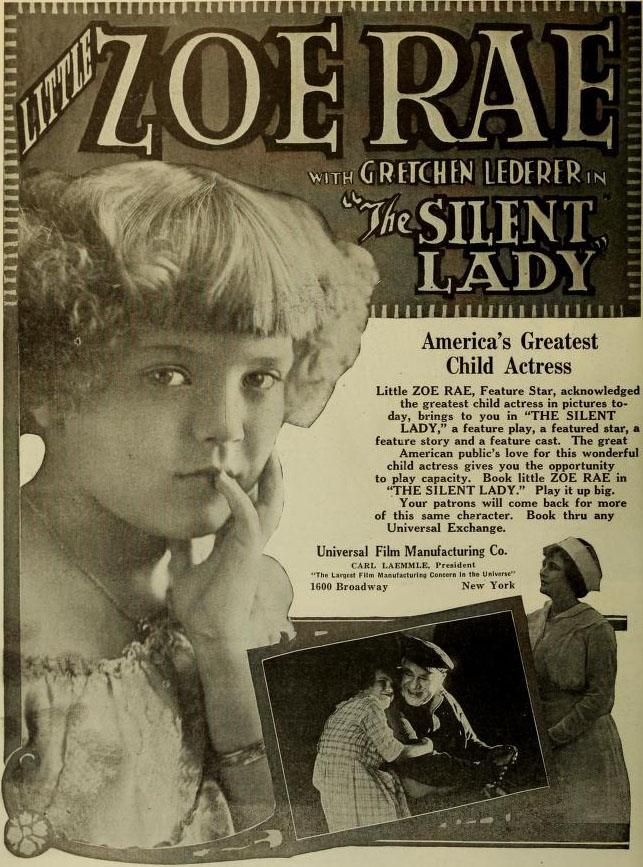
- Directed by: Elsie Jane Wilson
- Written by: Elliott J. Clawson
- Starring: Gretchen Lederer; Zoe Rae; Winter Hall
- Production company: Universal Pictures
- Distributed by: Universal Pictures
- Release date: December 10, 1917
- Running time: 50 minutes
- Country: United States
- Languages: Silent; English intertitles

The Silent Lady is a 1917 American silent drama film directed by Elsie Jane Wilson and starring Gretchen Lederer, Zoe Rae and Winter Hall.

== Cast ==
- Gretchen Lederer as Miss Summerville
- Zoe Rae as Little Kate
- Winter Hall as Philemon
- Harry Holden as Peter
- J. Edwin Brown as Capt. Bartholomew
- Lule Warrenton as Mrs. Hayes
- E. Alyn Warren as Dr. Carlyle

== Bibliography ==
- Robert B. Connelly. The Silents: Silent Feature Films, 1910-36, Volume 40, Issue 2. December Press, 1998.
