= The Lair of the Wolf =

- Directed by: Charles Swickard
- Written by: E. Magnus Ingleton
- Starring: Donna Drew; Gretchen Lederer; Joseph W. Girard
- Cinematography: Edward A. Kull
- Production company: Universal Pictures
- Distributed by: Universal Pictures
- Release date: August 20, 1917
- Running time: 50 minutes
- Country: United States
- Languages: Silent; English intertitles

The Lair of the Wolf is a 1917 American silent drama film directed by Charles Swickard and starring Donna Drew, Gretchen Lederer and Joseph W. Girard.

== Cast ==
- Donna Drew as Steve Taylor
- Gretchen Lederer as Margaret Dennis
- Joseph W. Girard as Oliver Cathcart
- Chester Bennett as Jim Dennis
- Val Paul as Raymond Taylor
- Charles Hill Mailes as Robert Shepherd
- Peggy Custer as Bess Shepherd
- George Berrell as Old Man Taylor

== Bibliography ==
- Robert B. Connelly. The Silents: Silent Feature Films, 1910-36, Volume 40, Issue 2. December Press, 1998.
