= What Would You Do? (film) =

1920 film by Edmund Lawrence

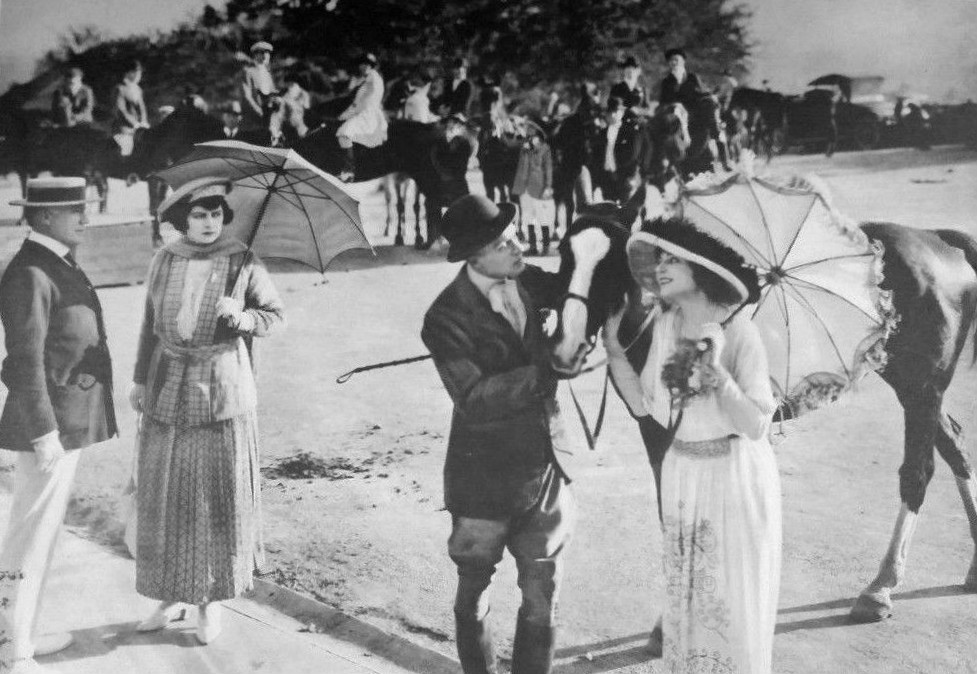
- Lobby card
- Directed by: Edmund Lawrence; Denison Clift
- Written by: Denison Clift (story)
- Screenplay by: Denison Clift
- Starring: Madlaine Traverse; George A. McDaniel; Frank Elliott; Charles K. French; Lenore Lynard; Bud Geary
- Cinematography: Walter Williams
- Production company: Fox Film Corporation
- Distributed by: Fox Film Corporation
- Release date: January 1920
- Running time: 5 reels
- Country: United States
- Language: Silent (English intertitles)

What Would You Do? is a 1920 American silent drama film directed by Edmund Lawrence and Denison Clift. It starring Madlaine Traverse, George A. McDaniel, Frank Elliott, Charles K. French, Lenore Lynard, and Bud Geary. The film was released by Fox Film Corporation in January 1920.

== Plot ==
After Hugh Chilson's business partner, Le Roi Andrews scams a pair of stockholders for money, Hugh is told by his wife, Claudia Chilson, and his lawyer, to leave the US and move to South America to avoid jail. Boarding a large ship, Hugh decides to commit suicide by jumping off but only manages to land on a smaller boat, which takes him to South America. Once there, Hugh makes a fortune selling nitrate.

Back home, Claudia marries Curtis Brainerd, believing she is now a widow. After Curtis falls off a horse and becomes a cripple, Claudia leaves a gun near him in case he wants to end his suffering. Curtis commits suicide, and Hugh arrives back from South America. Claudia is arrested for assisting Curtis with his death, but Curtis's brother, Robert decides not to press charges after being urged not to. Wanting a new start, Hugh decides to go back to South America with Claudia.

== Cast ==
- Madlaine Traverse as Claudia Chilson
- George A. McDaniel as Hugh Chilson
- Frank Elliott as Curtis Brainerd
- Charles K. French as Robert Brainerd
- Lenore Lynard as Lily Brainerd
- Bud Geary as Tom Holbrook
- Edwin B. Tilton as Le Roi Andrews
- Cordelia Callahan as Nurse

== Production ==
During production, director Edmund Lawrence stressed the lack of water in the setting to Madlaine Traverse, and ordered her to not wash her face for several days before shooting.

== Preservation ==
The film is now considered lost.
