= The Door Between (film) =

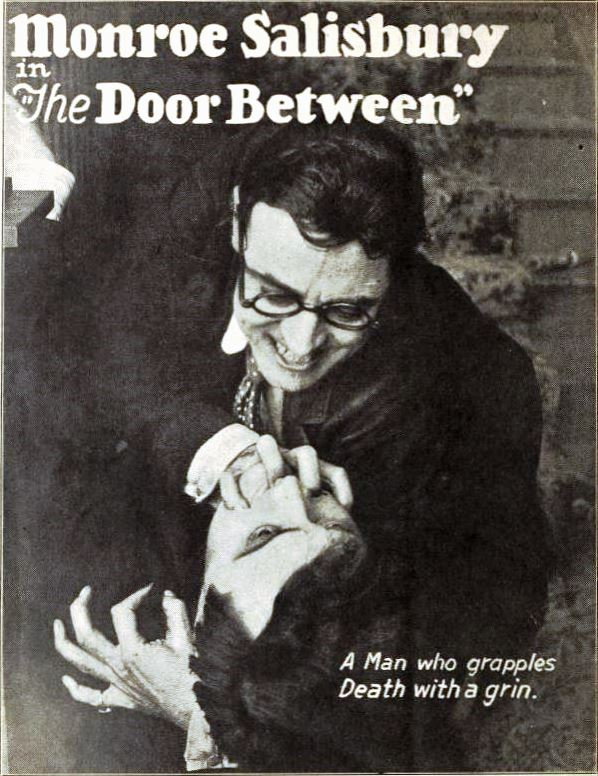
- Directed by: Rupert Julian
- Written by: Samuel Merwin (novel); Elliott J. Clawson
- Starring: Ruth Clifford; Monroe Salisbury; George A. McDaniel
- Production company: Universal Pictures
- Distributed by: Universal Pictures
- Release date: November 18, 1917
- Running time: 50 minutes
- Country: United States
- Languages: Silent; English intertitles

The Door Between is a 1917 American silent drama film directed by Rupert Julian and starring Ruth Clifford, Monroe Salisbury and George A. McDaniel. It is adapted from a story that appeared in serialized editions in McClure's Magazine in 1913–14.

== Plot ==
Archibald Crocker, an American alcoholic, visits a geisha house in Japan where the scientist Dr. Anthony Ives Eckhart is staying to study Asian music. Dr. Eckhart discovers that Crocker has come to Asia to kill his wife Heloise in revenge for leaving him. After Dr. Eckhart leaves for Beijing and finds Heloise, they fall in love. After Crocker arrives, Dr. Eckhart convinces him to consider sparing Heloise and seeking a legal separation instead. However, an hour later he arrives at Eckhart and Heloise's hotel to kill her. Crocker breaks his leg after Eckhart pushes him down a flight of stairs, and he decides to kill himself. Archibald and Heloise marry afterwards.

== Cast ==
- Ruth Clifford as Heloise Crocker
- Monroe Salisbury as Anthony Ives Eckhart
- George A. McDaniel as Archibald Crocker
- W. H. Bainbridge as Sir Robert

== Bibliography ==
- Robert B. Connelly. The Silents: Silent Feature Films, 1910-36, Volume 40, Issue 2. December Press, 1998.
