= The Circus of Life (1917 film) =

1917 American drama film directed by Rupert Julian

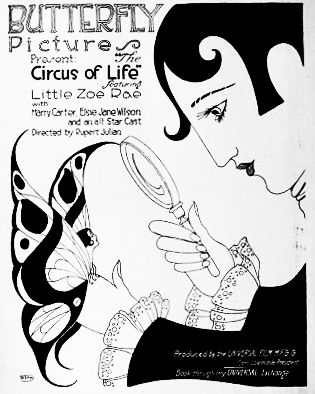
- Motion Picture Weekly ad
- Directed by: Rupert Julian; Elsie Jane Wilson
- Written by: Elliott J. Clawson
- Produced by: Butterfly Feature
- Starring: Elsie Jane Wilson
- Distributed by: Universal Pictures
- Release date: June 1917
- Running time: 5 reels
- Country: USA
- Language: Silent (English intertitles)

The Circus of Life is a 1917 American silent drama directed by Rupert Julian and Elsie Jane Wilson based on the story by Rupert Julian. The film stars Elsie Jane Wilson. The photoplay produced by the Butterfly Company and released on June 4, 1917, by Universal Pictures.

== Plot ==
Danny, driver of a beer wagon, marries Mamie but, shortly after, his wife neglects him, infatuated as she is with Gaston Bouvais, an artist. When Mamie has a baby daughter, Daisy May, Danny thinks he's not her father and, desperate, starts drinking. Although he thinks she is someone else's daughter, he loves little Daisy May and, when the child grows up, she will travel with him in the wagons carrying beer. During one such trip, Danny, having drunk too much, loses control of the horses. In the ensuing chaos, the little girl ends up injured. Meanwhile, Bouvais - who has continued his relationship with Mamie all those years - manages to persuade the woman to leave Danny. But the accident in which the daughter and her husband were involved, awakens love for Danny in the woman. Mamie rejects the painter who finally leaves her alone and turns her attention to another one who then marries. Happiness returns to Danny and Mamie's house. Daisy May also heals and Danny resumes work starting a new career: that of driver of milk wagons.

== Cast ==
Actor	Role
Elsie Jane Wilson	Mamie
Mignon Anderson	Kate
Harry Carter	Gaston Bouvais
Emory Johnson	Tommie
Zoe Rae	Daisy Mae
Nanine Wright	uncredited
Pomeroy Cannon	Danny
Burwell Hamrick	uncredited

== Gallery ==
The Players

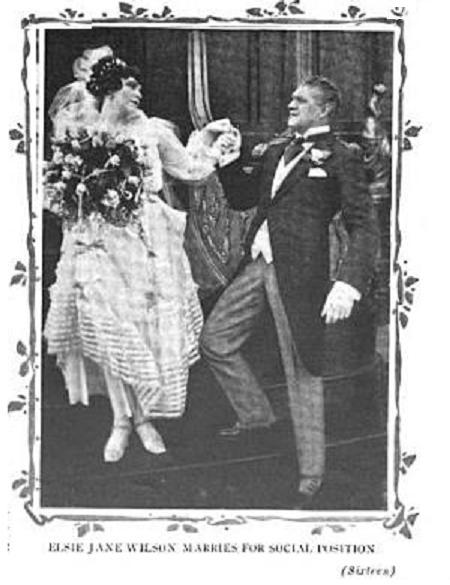
Elsie Jane Wilson

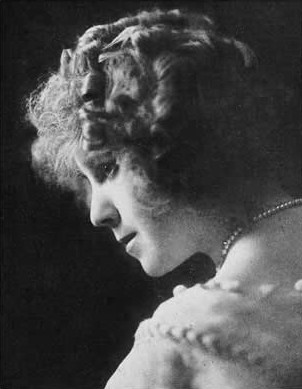
Mignon Anderson

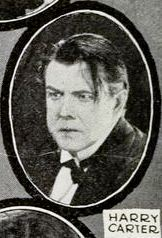
Harry Carter

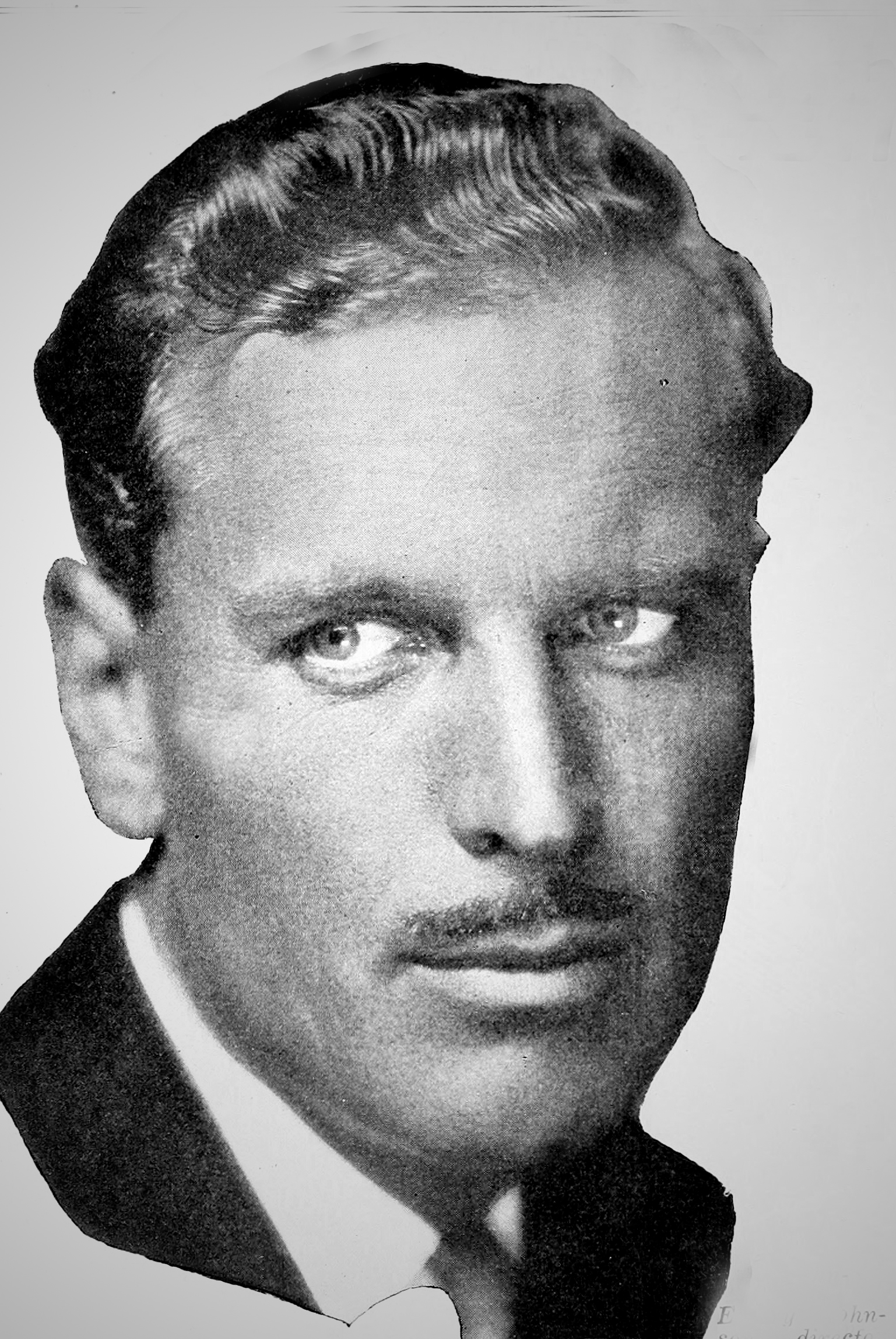
Emory Johnson

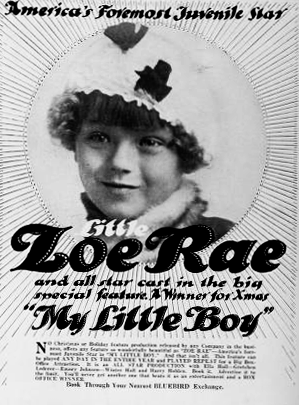
Zoe Rae
