= Lewis Henry Haney =

American economist (1883–1969)

Lewis H. Haney
- Born: March 30, 1883; Eureka, Illinois, US
- Died: July 1, 1969 (aged 87); Flower Hill, New York, US

Academic background
- Education: Illinois Wesleyan University; University of Wisconsin–Madison
- Doctoral advisor: Richard T. Ely; Balthasar H. Meyer

Lewis Henry Haney (March 30, 1882 – July 1, 1969) was a conservative American economist, professor, and economic columnist.

== Biography ==
Haney was born in Eureka, Illinois, and educated at Illinois Wesleyan University, Bloomington, Illinois. He received a B.A. and M.A. from Dartmouth College. Ned

Haney lectured at New York University in 1908, afterwards teaching at the universities of Iowa and Michigan, and was a professor of economics at the University of Texas. In 1920, he became director of the New York University Bureau of Business Research and professor of economics. In 1921 he was elected as a Fellow of the American Statistical Association. He was a syndicated columnist on economics for many years; a conservative, he attacked many aspects of the New Deal. He retired from teaching in 1955. Haney died of a stroke at St. Francis Hospital in Flower Hill, New York.

=== Personal life ===
Haney was married twice, fathering one daughter, Hope Haney West. His first wife was Anna Meta Stephenson. His second wife was Louise Olivier Thion. He was an Episcopalian.

== Works ==
- A Congressional History of Railways, (volume i, 1908; volume ii, 1910)
- History of Economic Thought, (1911, revised edition, 1919)
- Business Organization and Combination, (1913); and various articles on economic subjects for periodicals.
