= Zoe Rae =

American actress (1910–2006)

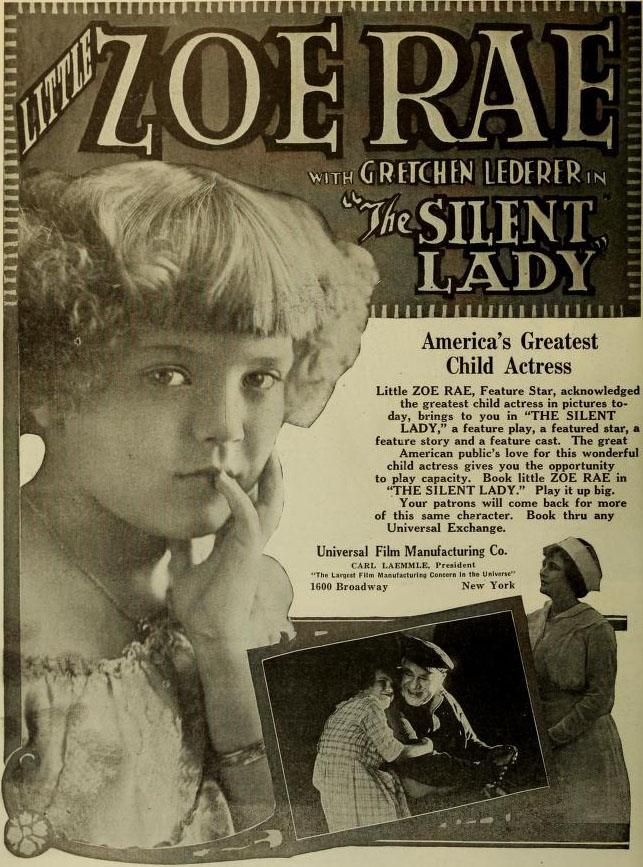
- Zoe Rae in The Silent Lady (1917)
- Born: July 13, 1910; Chicago, Illinois, U.S.
- Died: May 20, 2006 (aged 95); Newberg, Oregon, U.S.
- Occupation: Actress
- Years active: 1915–1920

Zoe Rae (born Zoë Rae Bech; July 13, 1910 – May 20, 2006) was an American child actress of the silent era. She appeared in 54 films between 1915 and 1920. She was called "the greatest little emotional actress on record" by Motion Picture Magazine.

As a baby, she had rickets, but she had recovered enough that at age six, she was signed by Universal Studios. She was nicknamed "Little Zoe, the Universal Baby", and would later fondly remember acting alongside Lon Chaney.

When she was ten, her father decided she could not make more movies until she had finished schooling. After college, she tried screenwriting and opened a dance studio in Hollywood. She married fellow dancer Ronald Foster Barlow in the early 1930s. When she was in her 90s, she received renewed attention from film enthusiasts. After being shown The Star Prince, in which she had played the title role at age eight, she exclaimed: "What a ham!"

== Selected filmography ==
- The Canceled Mortgage (1915)
- Bettina Loved a Soldier (1916)
- Naked Hearts (1916)
- The Bugler of Algiers (1916)
- A Kentucky Cinderella (1917)
- The Silent Lady (1917)
- The Cricket (1917)
- Heart Strings (1917)
- The Circus of Life (1917)
- My Little Boy (1917)
- The Little Pirate (1917)
- Polly Put the Kettle On (1917)
- The Magic Eye (1918)
- The Star Prince (1918)
- Ace of the Saddle (1919)
