= Elliott J. Clawson =

American screenwriter

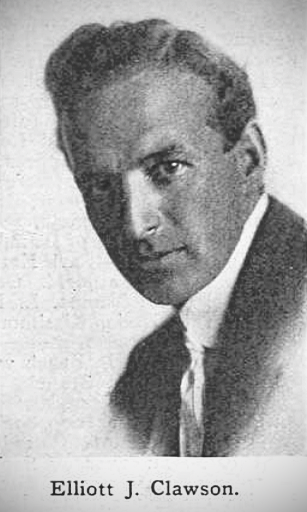
- Born: January 19, 1883; Salt Lake City, Utah, USA
- Died: July 21, 1942 (aged 59); Vista, California, USA
- Years active: 1913–1929
- Relatives: Dal Clawson (brother)

Elliott J. Clawson (January 19, 1883 – July 21, 1942) was an American screenwriter. He wrote for more than 80 films between 1913 and 1929. He was born in Salt Lake City, Utah, and died in Vista, California. At the 2nd Academy Awards in 1930, four of his films were nominated for Best Writing: The Cop, Sal of Singapore, Skyscraper, and The Leatherneck.

== Selected filmography ==
- The Tragedy of Whispering Creek (1914)
- Jack Chanty (1915)
- Madame la Presidente (1916)
- The Circus of Life (1917)
- Polly Redhead (1917)
- The Field of Honor (1917)
- The Silent Lady (1917)
- The Mysterious Mr. Tiller (1917)
- The Double Standard (1917)
- The Little Pirate (1917)
- Mother O' Mine (1917)
- The Door Between (1917)
- The Desire of the Moth (1917)
- The Cricket (1917)
- The Double Room Mystery (1917)
- The Little Orphan (1917)
- Hands Down (1918)
- A Soul for Sale (1918)
- Midnight Madness (1918)
- The Yellow Dog (1918)
- The Sleeping Lion (1919)
- Common Property (1919)
- Desperate Trails (1921)
- A Certain Rich Man (1921)
- The Lure of Egypt (1921)
- Under Two Flags (1922)
- The Woman's Side (1922)
- The Flame of Life (1923)
- The Spoilers (1923)
- The Flaming Forties (1924)
- Another Man's Wife (1924)
- Love and Glory (1924)
- The Phantom of the Opera (1925)
- The Man from Red Gulch (1925)
- Steel Preferred (1925)
- The Road to Mandalay (1926)
- Body and Soul (1927)
- West of Zanzibar (1928)
- The Cop (1928)
- Sal of Singapore (1928)
- Celebrity (1928)
- Skyscraper (1928)
- The Leatherneck (1929)
- The Thirteenth Chair (1929)
