= Ida May Park =

American screenwriter (1879–1954)

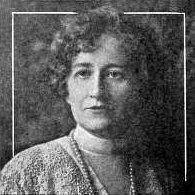
- Ida May Park in 1916
- Born: December 28, 1879; Los Angeles, California
- Died: June 13, 1954 (aged 74); Los Angeles, California
- Occupations: Screenwriter; Film director
- Years active: 1914–1930
- Spouse: Joseph De Grasse (m. 1901)
- Children: 1

Ida May Park (December 28, 1879 – June 13, 1954) was an American screenwriter and film director of the silent era, in the early 20th century. She wrote for more than 50 films between 1914 and 1930, and directed 14 films between 1917 and 1920. She was married to film director and producer Joseph De Grasse, with whom she was regularly teamed at Universal.

== Early life ==
Park was born in Los Angeles, California to Martha and Charles Park. She worked with the Alcazar Acting Company in San Francisco in 1897 and eventually began appearing in different acting troupes across the country over the next few years. She was praised for her work in the theater, for roles in productions like Frances Hodgson Burnett’s “A Lady of Quality” as well as “The Merchant of Venice” and “Romeo and Juliet.”

== Early career ==
During her time in the theatre she met her future husband, Joseph De Grasse, also an actor. They formed an acting troupe and appeared in mostly Shakespearean plays together. After settling down in Los Angeles, the two opened an acting school in the downtown area in 1908. Their students often held supporting roles in productions at the Auditorium and the Belasco Theatre. In 1909, Park joined the Los Angeles Women’s Orchestra and played trumpet. The Pathe film organization hired De Grasse as a film director and hired Park as a writer in 1910. They developed their skills at Pathe and later at other film organizations like Lubin and Ammex before being hired by Universal Feature Film Manufacturing Company in 1914. Park was the second female filmmaker to ever be hired at Universal.

== Work at Universal ==
"Whereas director Lois Weber “was totally committed to cinema as a tool for moral betterment and strained all her energies to this end, Ida May Park was a hack with no pretensions to art or education whatsoever. A slave-driver known generally around the studio as 'Mrs. Simon Legree', she subordinated all else to getting the product out on time and under budget, the very model of a modern studio functionary."—Film historian Richard Koszarski in Hollywood Directors, 1914-1940 (1976).

The first screenplay that she wrote was titled A Gypsy Romance which was developed into a short scenario by director Wallace Reid. Reid also directed the next scenario that she wrote, The Man Within. Park then started to work with De Grasse who directed the next several pieces that she wrote. The two worked on multiple shorts and scenarios together over several years. Their first joint project was the short Her Bounty (1914). This film starred Pauline Bush in one of her first projects under Universal. Park was credited as a writer under the moniker “Mrs. Joe De Grasse.” The short, a melodrama, featured themes of self-sacrifice which was a hallmark of the genre at that time. Their first feature-length film was Father and The Boys (1915). The film was based on the 1908 play of the same name written by playwright George Ade, who licensed the play to Universal in late May 1915. The film began production just a few months later in October and starred stage actor Digby Bell as well as Colin Chase and Louise Carbasse. The film released that December to positive reviews. Most of the titles that the two worked on together were for Universal's Bluebird label. Bluebird Photoplays was a prestige division of films produced by Universal. Films made under Bluebird were usually based on popular literature. Bluebird films were typically made up of five reels, diverging from previous two reel productions common at Universal as feature length pictures became the industry standard. One such film, The Grasp of Greed (1916) was directed by De Grasse and written by Park. It was adapted for the screen from the 1888 novel by H. Rider Haggard titled Mr. Meeson’s Will, a very popular novel at the time. The film, starring Louise Lovely, was criticized for its overly melodramatic tone which diverged from the source material.

Park made her solo directorial debut in 1917 when she directed The Flashlight starring Universal's top dramatic actress Dorothy Phillips. The film was based on a short story by Albert M. Treynor released in 1913 titled “The Flash-light.” Production at Universal Studios began on January 27, 1917 and ended March 24, 1917. While De Grasse was initially credited as the director, this later changed as Park ended up directing the film after De Grasse went on vacation. After this picture, she and DeGrasse took turns directing Bluebird projects featuring Phillips. One of these films included The Piper’s Price (1917), based on the 1915 short story of the same name by Nancy Mann Waddell Woodrow (also known as Mrs. Wilson Woodrow). This film was written by Park and directed by De Grasse. Upon its release, the film was criticized by censors in Quebec, Canada. Eventually, De Grasse moved on to other projects in 1918, but Park stuck with Phillips and continued to direct films with her as the star. Broadway Love (1918), both written and directed by Park and starring Phillips, depicted a modern New York City which, at that time, was suffering from coal shortages. The sets of New York City were dimmed to reflect this shortage, and was the first film to accurately depict what the lack of street lights looked like. Another film Park wrote and directed was Bread (1918) starring Mary MacLaren, Gladys Fox, Edward Cecil, and Louis Morrison. The film received mixed reviews with some critics expressing discomfort with Morrison’s character, Emil Krause. Other critics praised the films technical aspects, such as Park’s direction and the use of rain scenes. Since the film was released towards the end of World War I, MacLaren offered, as advertisement for the film, five dollars to a housewife that could come up with a recipe for "Victory Bread" that used the least amount of wheat in support of the US in the ongoing war. Many of the films Park directed were deemed "women's features".

Park and De Grasse continued at Universal Studios until 1919 when they left for unknown reasons.

== Later career ==
After leaving Universal, Park directed The Butterfly Man (1920), starring Lew Cody. The film was based on George Barr McCutcheon’s 1910 novel, The Butterfly Man. McCutcheon was paid $25,000 for the screen rights for his novel, one of the highest prices ever paid for the rights to a property for a film adaptation at that time. The film featured a prologue involving butterflies. As the film began production at the Astra Film Corporation in Edendale, Los Angeles, Park asked for the help of local school-kids to assist her in collecting up to 1,000 butterflies for the prologue sequence. Park offered to pay fifty cents for each butterfly, and promised to release them after filming. Park not only wrote and directed this film, but also cut and edited it herself. The Butterfly Man was followed by two independent feature-length films co-directed with her husband. The first of these films, Bonnie May (1920), starred Bessie Love and was written by Bernard McConville, based on the 1916 Louis Dodge novel with the same title. The film was produced by Andrew J. Callaghan who hired De Grasse and Park after a long search for the right director for the project. The second film, The Midlanders (1920), began production before Bonnie May, despite being released later. The film also starred Bessie Love and was produced by Callaghan. The Midlanders marked an important moment for Love, as it was her first independent production. Callaghan had set up a production company for the actress, paying thousands of dollars to gain the rights to Charles Tenney Jackson’s novel, The Midlanders (1912) for her first picture. Bonnie May would be Love’s first official release under her new company. Callaghan, shortly after production wrapped on The Midlanders, announced plans for a new production unit: Ida May Park Productions. Lauding her directorial skills, especially with Love, Callaghan offered Park the opportunity and funding to develop her talents with new films under this production unit.

Despite his plans, Ida May Park Productions never came to fruition, and it would be only a few years before Park was absent from the film industry entirely. While there is no definite explanation for her sudden absence from Hollywood, the 1920 economic recession is a possible indicator as to why Ida May Park Productions would be left unestablished. The expanding corporate attitudes of the film industry at the time that often pushed women to the side also offers an explanation as to why Park herself would eventually be on the outs in Hollywood. Park’s directorial career ended in 1920, despite writing a piece for Careers for Women in that same year where she spoke of film directing as a medium open to strong women. De Grasse continued to direct for a few more years, and Park continued to write for the screen. She wrote an additional two films before she left the industry altogether. One of these films was The Hidden Way (1926), directed by De Grasse and starring Macy Carr, Gloria Grey, and Tom Santschi. Filming took place outside of Glendale, California, and one scene involved an elaborate runaway horse sequence featuring a train that thrilled audiences despite its danger to the actors involved. The last feature film that she wrote was Playthings of Hollywood (1931) for Willis Kent Productions. The film depicts three sisters, played by Phyllis Barrington, Rita La Roy, and Sheila Manners, as they try to find success in their lives, and paints a portrait of the scarce opportunities for women in Hollywood. The film was directed by William O’Connor.

Ida May Park died in Los Angeles on June 13, 1954, at age 74. Many of the films she worked on are now considered lost by the National Film Preservation Board.

== Personal life ==
Park met her husband while touring the country in theater troupes. The two married in New York City on May 25, 1901. Park kept her maiden name, which was unusual for women at that time. Park and De Grasse later moved to Burbank, California before finally settling down at 1040 E. 47th Street in Los Angeles. This is where they had their son, Joseph.

== Selected filmography ==
Film	Year	Director	Writer	Notes
Her Bounty	1914	No	Yes	
All for Peggy	1915	No	Yes	
The Grind	1915	No	Yes	
The Girl of the Night	1915	No	Yes	
Steady Company	1915	No	Yes	
Bound on the Wheel	1915	No	Yes	
Mountain Justice	1915	No	Yes	
Alas and Alack	1915	No	Yes	
A Mother's Atonement	1915	No	Yes	
Lon of Lone Mountain	1915	No	Yes	
The Millionaire Paupers	1915	No	Yes	
Father and the Boys	1915	No	Yes	Lost
Dolly's Scoop	1916	No	Yes	
The Grip of Jealousy	1916	No	Yes	Lost
Tangled Hearts	1916	No	Yes	Lost
The Gilded Spider	1916	No	Yes	Lost
Bobbie of the Ballet	1916	No	Yes	Lost
The Grasp of Greed	1916	No	Yes	
If My Country Should Call	1916	No	Yes	
The Place Beyond the Winds	1916	No	Yes	
The Price of Silence	1916	No	Yes	
The Piper's Price	1917	No	Yes	Lost
Bondage	1917	Yes	Yes	Lost
Hell Morgan's Girl	1917	No	Yes	Lost
The Girl in the Checkered Coat	1917	No	Yes	Lost
The Flashlight	1917	Yes	Yes	Lost
Fires of Rebellion	1917	Yes	Yes	Lost
The Rescue	1917	Yes	Yes	Lost
The Model's Confession	1918	Yes	Yes	Lost
Broadway Love	1918	Yes	Yes	
Bread	1918	Yes	Yes	
The Grand Passion	1918	Yes	Yes	Lost
The Vanity Pool	1918	Yes	Yes	Lost
Bonnie May	1920	Yes	No	Lost
The Midlanders	1920	Yes	Yes	Lost
The Butterfly Man	1920	Yes	Yes	Lost
The Hidden Way	1926	No	Yes	
Playthings of Hollywood	1930	No	Yes	

== Selected bibliography ==
- "Male (Vamp) and Female (Director)," brief photo-illustrated profile of Lew Cody and Ida May Parks [sic], Photoplay, May 1920, p. 44.
- Koszarski, Richard. 1976. Hollywood Directors: 1914-1940. Oxford University Press. Library of Congress Catalog Number: 76-9262.
- “7,200 Lost U.S. Silent Feature Films (1912-29).” National Film Preservation Board. 2021. 14-143
- “Bonnie May (1920).” American Film Institute Catalog.
- “Bread (1918).” American Film Institute Catalog.
- “Broadway Love (1918).” American Film Institute Catalog.
- “The Butterfly Man (1920).” American Film Institute Catalog.
- Cooper, Mark Garrett. "Ida May Park.". Women Film Pioneers Project. New York, NY: Columbia University Libraries. 2013.
- Delamoir, Jeannette. “Louise Lovely’s Star Persona Through Universal’s Brands.” National Film and Sound Archive of Australia.
- “Father and the Boys (1915).” American Film Institute Catalog.
- “The Flashlight (1917).” American Film Institute Catalog.
- “The Grasp of Greed (1916).” American Film Institute Catalog. “Her Bounty (1914).” American Film Institute Catalog.
- “The Hidden Way (1926).” American Film Institute Catalog.
- “Ida May Park.” American Film Institute Catalog.
- “Ida May Park.” International Film Festival Rotterdam.
- “Ida May Park.” Mubi.
- “Mary Mallory / Hollywood Heights: Ida May Park Finds Direction in Films.” LA Daily Mirror. 2022.
- “The Midlanders (1920).” American Film Institute Catalog.
- “The Piper’s Price (1917).” American Film Institute Catalog.
- “Playthings of Hollywood (1931).” American Film Institute Catalog.
- Welch, Rosanne. “Ida May Park Headlined One of Universal Studios First Female Production Companies.” Script Magazine. 2023.
