= Meeson =

Meeson may refer to:

== People ==
- Alfred Meeson (1808–1885), British architect
- Dora Meeson (1869–1955), Australian artist
- John Meeson Parsons (1798–1870), English art collector

== Other uses ==
- Mr Meeson's Will, a novel by H. Rider Haggard
