= The Sealed Room =

The Sealed Room may refer to:

- The Sealed Room (1909 film), a film directed by D. W. Griffith
- The Sealed Room (1926 film), an Australian silent film
