= The Mystery of a Hansom Cab (1925 film) =

1925 film

- Directed by: Arthur Shirley
- Written by: Arthur Shirley
- Based on: novel by Fergus Hume
- Produced by: Arthur Shirley
- Starring: Arthur Shirley; Godfrey Cass
- Cinematography: Lacey Percival
- Production company: Pyramid Pictures
- Distributed by: Alec Hellmrich
- Release date: 7 February 1925
- Running time: 10,000 feet
- Country: Australia
- Languages: Silent film English intertitles
- Budget: £2,500
- Box office: £15,000

The Mystery of a Hansom Cab is a 1925 Australian silent film directed by and starring Arthur Shirley based on the popular novel which had already been filmed in 1911. It is considered a lost film.

== Plot ==
Oliver Whyte is found murdered in a hansom cab in Melbourne. Brian Fitzgerald is arrested for the crime and brought to trial, but is acquitted at the last minute by Sal Rawlin, a missing witness who produces an alibi. The mystery involves Brian's fiancée, Madge.

== Cast ==
- Arthur Shirley as Brian Fitzgerald
- Grace Glover as Madge
- Roland Stavey as detective
- Cora Warner as Mother Guttersnipe
- Isa Crossley as Sal Rawlin
- Godfrey Cass
- Vera Remee
- Isa Millett
- Sydney Stirling
- Carlton Stuart
- Leslie Woods
- Frank Barnes
- Arthur Orbell
- Charles Vincent
- John Bruce
- Billie Sim

== Background ==
This was Shirley's directorial debut. He had started filming a South Seas romance called The Throwback in 1920 but had been unable to complete it. He subsequently sued his cinematographer, Ernest Higgins, but lost the case and had to declare bankruptcy.

Shirley managed to recover and establish a new company, Pyramid Pictures, with the backing of several Melbourne businessman, including Gilbert M. Johnson. Pyramid signed Shirley to a seven-year contract in April 1924, at £20 a week while making a movie, £15 a week otherwise.

Cora Warner, who appeared in the support cast, ran the theatrical boarding house in Woolloomooloo where Shirley was staying.

== Production ==
Filming began in February 1924 and took five months to photograph. Many of the scenes were in Melbourne on the steps of Parliament House, in the Fitzroy Gardens, and also St. Kilda Road. Interiors were shot in Sydney at a studio in Rushcutters Bay. It was the first movie in Australia to run for ten reels and use double exposure.

== Reception ==
The movie received good reviews and was a major commercial success, with The Sydney Morning Herald saying that it played "to a greatly interested audience."
