= The Curse of Eve =

The Curse of Eve (alt:Mother, I Need You)
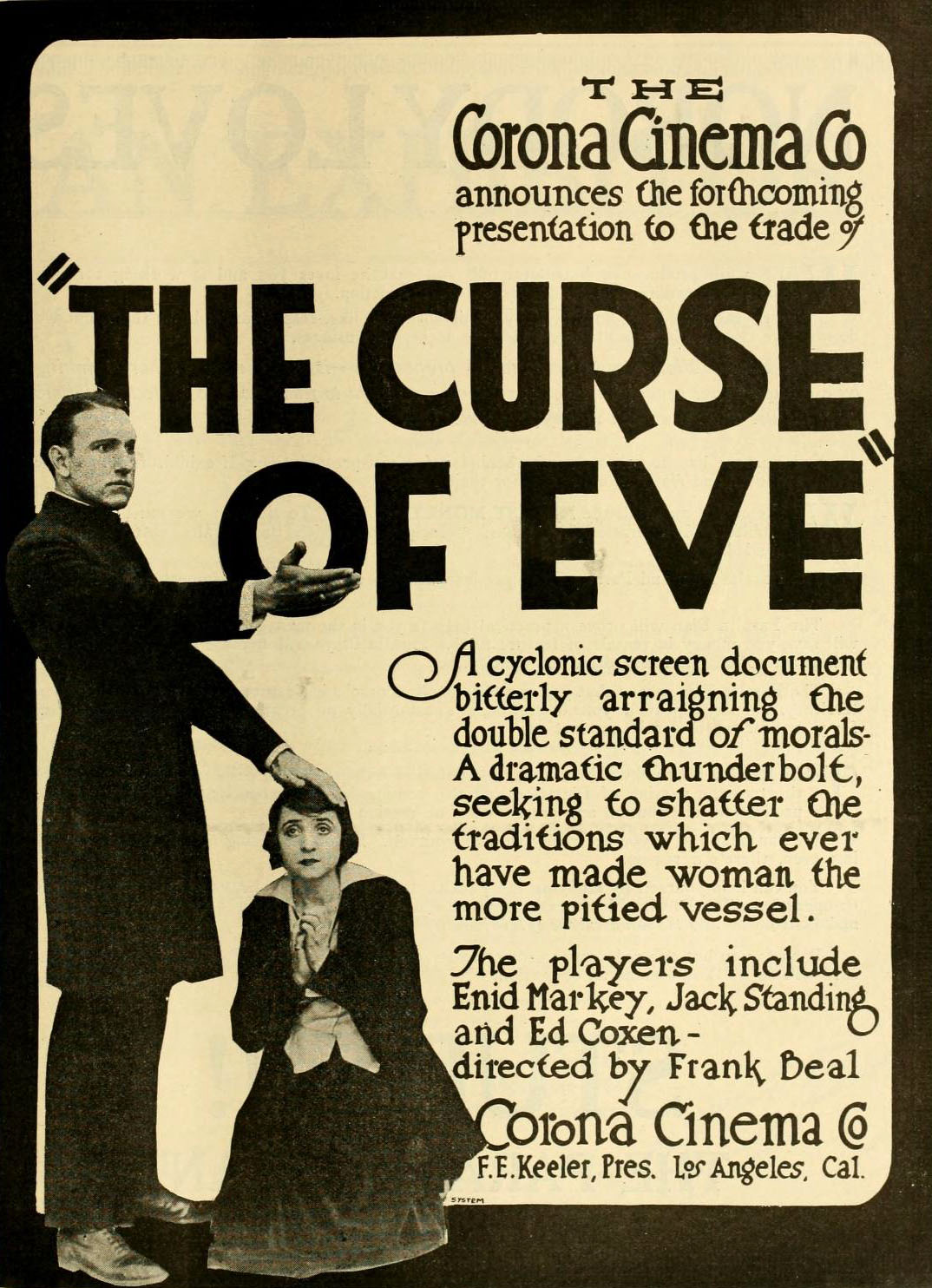
- Directed by: Frank Beal
- Written by: Joseph Anthony Roach
- Based on: a story by Wycliffe A. Hill
- Produced by: Corona Cinema Co. F. E. Keeler
- Starring: Enid Markey; Ed Coxen
- Cinematography: William C. Thompson
- Music by: Louis F. Gottschalk
- Distributed by: State Rights
- Release date: October 1917
- Running time: 6 reels
- Country: USA
- Language: Silent..English titles

The Curse of Eve is a lost 1917 American silent drama film directed by Frank Beal and starring Enid Markey and Edward Coxen. It is also known under its alternate title Mother, I Need You.

== Cast ==
- Enid Markey - Eva Stanley
- Edward Coxen - John Gilbert
- Jack Standing - Leo Spencer
- Eugenie Besserer - The Mother
- William Quinn - Dr. Burton
- G. Raymond Nye - Attorney
- Clarissa Selwynne - Marie
- Elsie Greeson -
- Marion Warner -
- Arthur Allardt -
- Grace Thompson -

== Production ==
The Garden of Eve sequence was shot on Santa Catalina Island. Released on State Rights basis it was heavily re-edited or censored in some jurisdictions because Markey's character has an abortion.
