= Bonnie May =

1920 silent film by Ida May Park

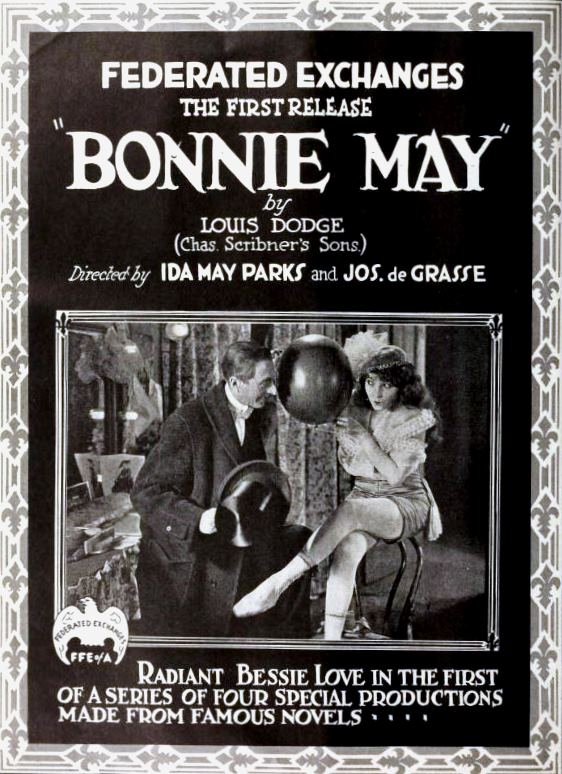
- Magazine advertisement
- Directed by: Ida May Park; Joseph De Grasse
- Based on: Bonnie May (novel) by Louis Dodge
- Produced by: Andrew J. Callaghan
- Starring: Bessie Love; Charles Gordon
- Cinematography: Sam Landers
- Production companies: Andrew J. Callaghan Productions, Inc.
- Distributed by: Federated Film Exchanges of America, Inc.
- Release date: October 17, 1920 (U.S.)
- Running time: 5 reels
- Country: United States
- Language: Silent (English intertitles)
- Budget: $75,000

Bonnie May is a lost silent 1920 American comedy-drama film based on the 1916 novel by Louis Dodge. It was directed by Ida May Park and Joseph De Grasse and starred Bessie Love. It was produced by Andrew J. Callaghan Productions and distributed by Federated Film Exchanges of America, Inc.

== Plot ==
An orphaned girl grows up in the theater. She becomes smarter and stronger, and never loses her optimism.

== Cast ==
- Bessie Love
- Charles Gordon
- William Herbert Bainbridge
- Lon Poff
- Miss DuPont

== Release ==
As this was Bessie Love's first film with Film Exchanges of America, Inc., it was very heavily promoted. A thirty-eight page press book was created, as well as special souvenir mirrors.

On its release, it was shown with The Son of Tarzan; Mystic Mush, a Hank Mann comedy; and a Mutt and Jeff cartoon.

After its release, producer Andrew J. Callaghan sued Federated Film Exchanges, saying that the distributor had not paid the full amount to distribute this film, The Midlanders, and Penny of Top Hill Trail.

== Reception ==
The film received positive reviews. Author Louis Dodge, who wrote the novel on which the film is based, highly praised Love's performance.
