= Grace Thompson =

American silent film actress

- Born: 1891
- Died: Unknown
- Occupation: Film actress

Grace Thompson was an early American silent film actress, starring in 10 films between 1914 and 1917.

== Filmography ==
- The Final Impulse (1914)
- The Scarlet Sin (aka The Shepherd of the Mines) (1915) .... Edith Jackson
- Mountain Justice (1915) .... Mary Kirke
- The Valley of Regeneration (1915)
- The Lilt of Love (1915)
- The Eagle (1915)
- The Millionaire Paupers (1915) .... Enid
- The Man in the Chair (1915)
- The Grip of Jealousy (1916) .... Beth Grant
- The Curse of Eve (1917)
