= Mirandy Smiles =

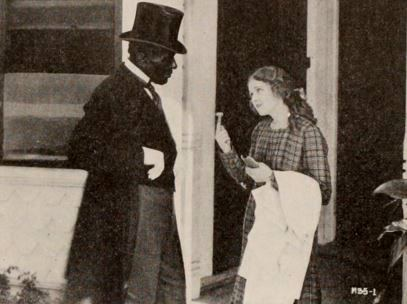
- Film still
- Directed by: William C. deMille
- Screenplay by: Edith Kennedy (scenario)
- Based on: "The Littlest Scrub Lady" by Belle K. Maniates
- Produced by: Jesse L. Lasky
- Starring: Vivian Martin; Douglas MacLean; William Freeman; Frances Beech
- Cinematography: Frank E. Garbutt
- Production company: Famous Players–Lasky Corporation
- Distributed by: Paramount Pictures
- Release date: December 15, 1918
- Running time: 50 minutes
- Country: United States
- Language: Silent (English intertitles)

Mirandy Smiles is a 1918 American silent drama film directed by William C. deMille and written by Edith Kennedy based upon a short story by Belle K. Maniates. The film stars Vivian Martin, Douglas MacLean, William Freeman, and Frances Beech. The film was released on December 15, 1918, by Paramount Pictures. It is not known whether the film currently survives, which suggests that it is a lost film.

== Plot ==
As described in a film magazine, Mirandy's mother Mrs. Judkins "takes in" laundry and Mirandy Judkins scrubs the floors of the town opera house. Teddy Lawrence, who plays the piano at the theater, is also organist at St. Mark's church. Mirandy upon Teddy's invitation attends church services and meets Rose White, who is in love with the minister. Mirandy is given the work of laundering the surplices and is entrusted with a note to the minister pinned to one of the frocks. The not falls out, however, and is not delivered until the minister is called to marry the Boarder to Annie May. Mirandy and Teddy come to an understanding and manage to smile through their trials and tribulations.

== Cast ==
- Vivian Martin as Mirandy Judkins
- Douglas MacLean as Teddy Lawrence
- William Freeman as The Boarder
- Frances Beech as Annie May
- Gean Gennung as Rose White
- Elinor Hancock as Mrs. White (credited as Eleanor Hancock)
- Mayme Kelso as Mrs. Judkins (credited as Maym Kelso)
- Louis Willoughby as John Kennedy (credited as Lewis Willoughby)
