= Midnight Madness (1918 film) =

1918 silent film

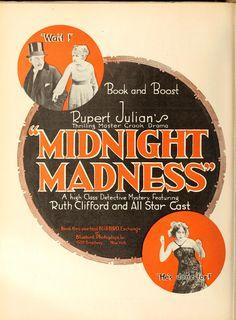
- Directed by: Rupert Julian
- Written by: Elliott J. Clawson
- Starring: Ruth Clifford; Kenneth Harlan; Harry von Meter
- Cinematography: Edward A. Kull
- Production company: Universal Pictures
- Distributed by: Universal Pictures
- Release date: June 8, 1918
- Running time: 50 minutes
- Country: United States
- Languages: Silent; English intertitles

Midnight Madness is a 1918 American silent mystery film directed by Rupert Julian and starring Ruth Clifford, Kenneth Harlan and Harry von Meter.

== Cast ==
- Ruth Clifford as Gertrude Temple
- Kenneth Harlan as Prentice Tiller
- Harry von Meter as Aaron Molitor
- Claire Du Brey as Lola Montez
- Harry Holden as Simon Temple
- Louis Willoughby as Chevat

== Bibliography ==
- Ken Wlaschin. Silent Mystery and Detective Movies: A Comprehensive Filmography. McFarland, 2009.
