= The Millionaire Paupers =

1915 film

- Directed by: Joe De Grasse
- Written by: Ida May Park
- Produced by: Rex Film Co.
- Starring: Lon Chaney; Grace Thompson
- Distributed by: Universal Pictures
- Release date: October 26, 1915
- Running time: 3 reels (30 minutes)
- Country: United States
- Language: Silent with English intertitles

The Millionaire Paupers is a 1915 American silent drama film directed by Joe De Grasse, written by Ida May Park and featuring Lon Chaney and Grace Thompson. The film's working title was Fate's a Fiddler. Actress Olive Carey was advertised in an early promo piece, but apparently did not appear in the finished film. Only a fragment of the film survives in a private collection, having been discovered in the early 1990s.

== Plot ==
Mabel Burne-Smith hopes to marry her daughter Enid to wealthy Allen Winthrop as a way to extricate herself from her debts. She and Allen's mother agree to the marriage, even though Allen and Enid have never met. Enid wants nothing to do with it and escapes to a tenement house where she rents a room. Meanwhile, Allen has received an anonymous letter stating that Albert Martin, the landlord he hired to run one of his tenements, is a crook. Allen disguises himself and rents a room in his own tenement, which coincidentally is the same house where Enid is staying. Enid meets Allen for the first time, and the two are mutually attracted.

Enid has befriended a woman named Mabel and her sweetheart George. George is unhappy with all the attention that Martin, the landlord, has been paying to Mabel. Mabel confides to Enid that she is only being nice to Martin because she persuaded him to let her slide for awhile on her rent so that she could buy some new dresses. Enid pawns her last piece of jewelry to get the money Mabel needs to pay back Martin.

Martin comes to Mabel's room, demanding the rent money, and they begin to argue. Allen and George come to the room and Mabel has Martin hide in the closet. When the men enter, Martin appears and says he bought new dresses for Mabel. Enid, trying to save her friend's romance, says that it's not true and that the dresses are really hers. George and Mabel are reunited, but Allen leaves Enid, disappointed by her having accepted gifts from Martin.

Allen fires Martin, and hires George to run the tenement, while Enid leaves the tenement and returns home to her mother. Allen later regrets snubbing Enid and tries in vain to find some trace of her, but to no avail. Allen and his mother are later invited to the Burne-Smith's home for dinner, where he is supposed to meet the woman he is to marry. When he sees the woman is Enid, he realizes that they were fated to be together, and he and Enid are happily reunited.

== Cast ==
- Grace Thompson as Enid Burne-Smith
- Arthur Shirley as Allan Winthrop
- Gretchen Lederer as Mrs. Burne-Smith (Enid's mother)
- Miss Wilmer as Mrs. Winthrop (Allen's mother)
- Lon Chaney as Albert Martin, the landlord
- Marcia Moore as Mabel
- Millard K. Wilson as George
- Olive Carey (credited as Olive Fuller Golden) *Note - her appearance in the finished film is disputed by some sources

== Reception ==
"For the most part, this is a delightful picture. The story by Ida May Park has received excellent interpretation and realistic atmosphere. Each member of the cast deserves praise." --- Motion Picture News

== See also ==
- List of incomplete or partially lost films
