= Louis Willoughby =

English actor (1876–1968)

- Born: 10 July 1876; England
- Died: 12 September 1968 (aged 92); Clearwater, Florida
- Spouses: Vera Willoughby (m. 1904; div. 1939); Olga Petrova (m. 1939; died 1968)
- Children: Althea Willoughby

Louis Willoughby (10 July 1876 – 12 September 1968) was an English actor of the silent era.

Born in England, he was married to artist Vera Willoughby and the father of artist Althea Willoughby. After her death in 1939, he married Olga Petrova. He lived his final years in the United States, where he died in Clearwater, Florida.

== Selected filmography ==
- A Pair of Silk Stockings (1918)
- The Temple of Dusk (1918)
- The Model's Confession (1918)
- Midnight Madness (1918)
- Sauce for the Goose (1918)
- Mirandy Smiles (1918)
- Treasure of the Sea (1918)
- The Artistic Temperament (1919)
- Colonel Newcombe, the Perfect Gentleman (1920)
- Risky Business (1920)
- Desperate Youth (1921)
- The Scarlet Lady (1922)
- Was She Guilty? (1922)
- Mr. Barnes of New York (1922)
- Lamp in the Desert (1922)
- Trapped by the Mormons (1922)
- Shifting Sands (1922)
