= Branding Broadway =

1918 film

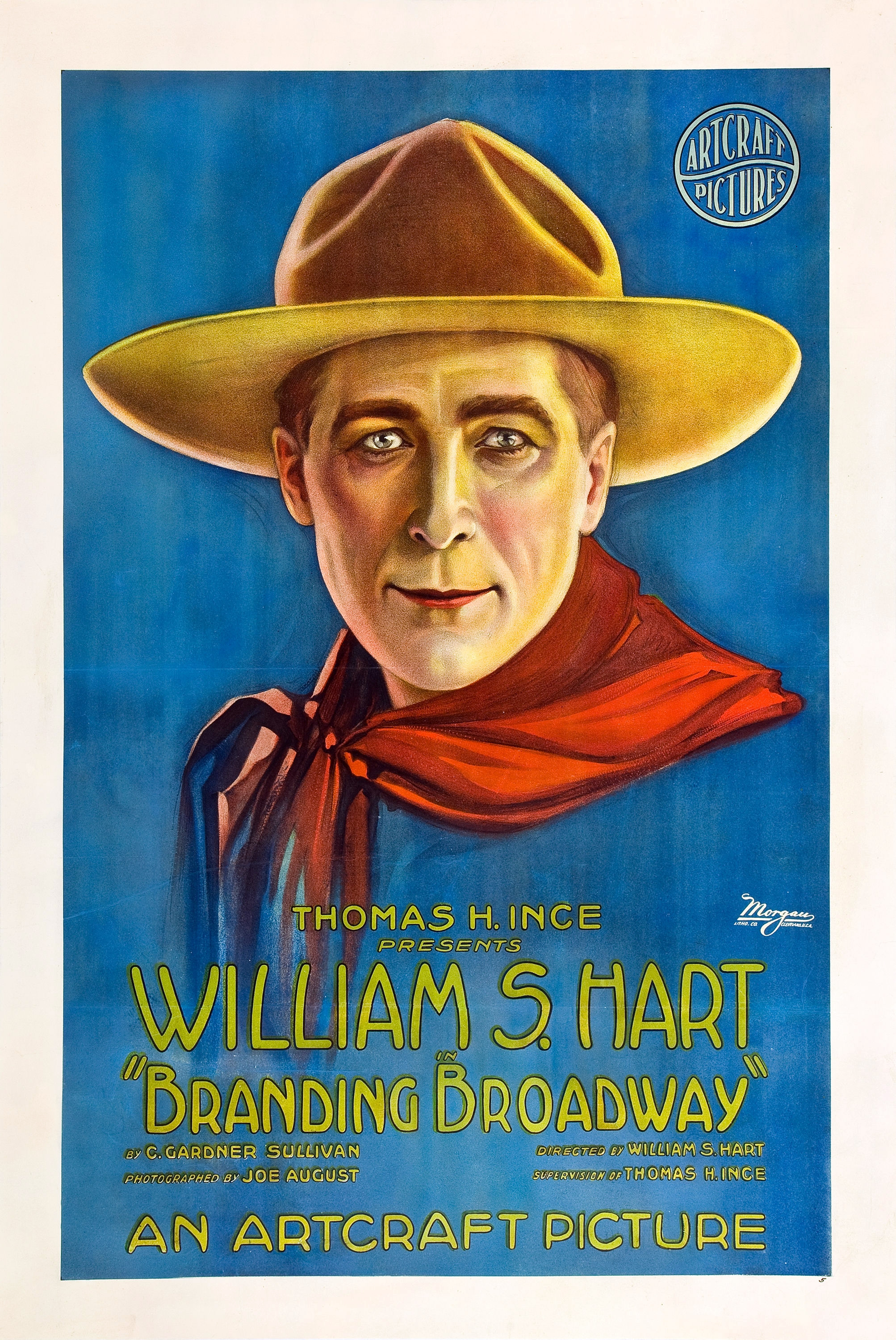
- Film poster
- Directed by: William S. Hart
- Written by: C. Gardner Sullivan
- Produced by: Thomas H. Ince; William S. Hart
- Starring: William S. Hart; Seena Owen; Arthur Shirley
- Cinematography: Joseph H. August
- Production company: William S. Hart Productions
- Distributed by: Artcraft Pictures
- Release date: December 1918
- Running time: 50 minutes
- Country: United States
- Languages: Silent; English intertitles

Branding Broadway is a 1918 American silent Western film directed by and starring William S. Hart, written by C. Gardner Sullivan, and produced by Thomas H. Ince and Hart.

== Plot ==
A tough cowboy, Robert Sands is banished from an Arizona town for his drunk and disorderly comment. He moves to New York and gets a job as bodyguard and guardian to a wealthy and spoiled young man. He falls in love with a restaurant owner who has compromising letters from the young man Sands is charged with protecting.

== Cast ==
Actor	Role
William S. Hart	Robert Sands
Seena Owen	Mary Lee
Arthur Shirley	Larry Harrington
Andrew Robson	Harrington Sr.
Lew Short	Dick Horn (as Lewis W. Short)

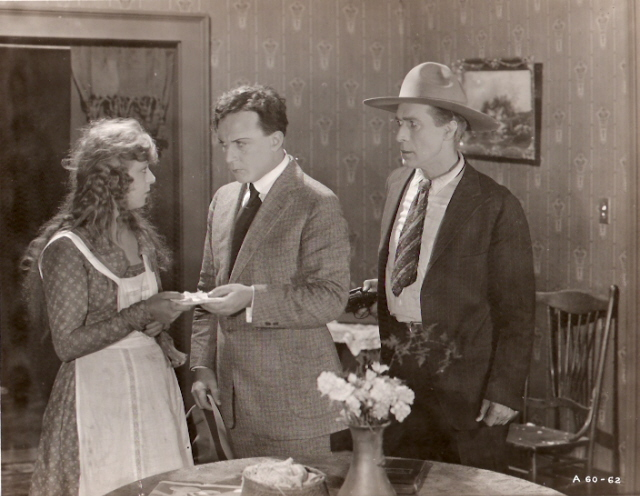
Film still with Seena Owen, Arthur Shirley, and William S. Hart

== Reception ==
Like many American films of the time, Branding Broadway was subject to restrictions and cuts by city and state film censorship boards. For example, the Chicago Board of Censors required, in Reel 1, that four scenes of Sands and his gang shooting up town be reduced by half, and cuts of three cafe fight scenes and, in Reel 5, all but the first and last scenes of the attack on the young woman.

== Preservation status ==
The film is preserved in the Museum of Modern Art (MOMA for short) collection in New York.
