= Belle K. Maniates =

American writer

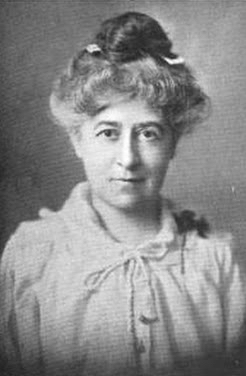
- Belle K. Maniates, from a 1915 publication
- Born: September 1861; Marshall, Michigan, US
- Died: November 13, 1931 (aged 70); Lansing, Michigan, US
- Occupation: Writer

Belle K. Maniates (September 1861 – November 13, 1931) was an American novelist and short story writer. At least three silent films were made based on works by Maniates: Amarilly of Clothes-Line Alley (1918), Mirandy Smiles (1918), and Penny of Top Hill Trail (1921).

== Early life ==
Belle Kanaris Maniates was born in Marshall, Michigan, in 1861. Her father Nicholas Kanaris Maniates was a Greek immigrant and a doctor. Her mother was Martha Arabelle Becker Maniates, of New York. Her father died in the same year that Belle Maniates was born. She was sometimes described as the niece or grandniece of Greek politician Konstantinos Kanaris.

== Career ==
Maniates, who worked as a secretary and clerk in the Michigan state government in Lansing, wrote "eight novels and hundreds of short stories". Several of her short stories appeared in the Chicago Defender newspaper. Books by Maniates included David Dunne, a Romance of the Middle West (1912), Amarilly of Clothes-Line Alley (1915), Mildew Manse (1916), Amarilly in Love (1917), Little Boy Bear (1917), Our Next Door Neighbors (1917), Penny of Top Hill Trail (1919), and Sand Holler (1920).

Three of her stories were adapted as silent films: Amarilly of Clothes-Line Alley (1918) was directed by Marshall Neilan, adapted by Frances Marion and starred Mary Pickford; Mirandy Smiles (1918) was directed by William C. deMille, adapted by Edith M. Kennedy, and starred Vivian Martin; and Penny of Top Hill Trail (1921) was directed by Arthur Berthelet, adapted by Finis Fox and Beatrice Van, and starred Bessie Love. Amarilly of Clothes-Line Alley and Mildew Alley were also adapted for the stage, in 1917 and 1922.

== Personal life ==
Maniates died in Lansing in 1931, aged 70 years.
