= The Midlanders =

1920 silent film by Joe De Grasse

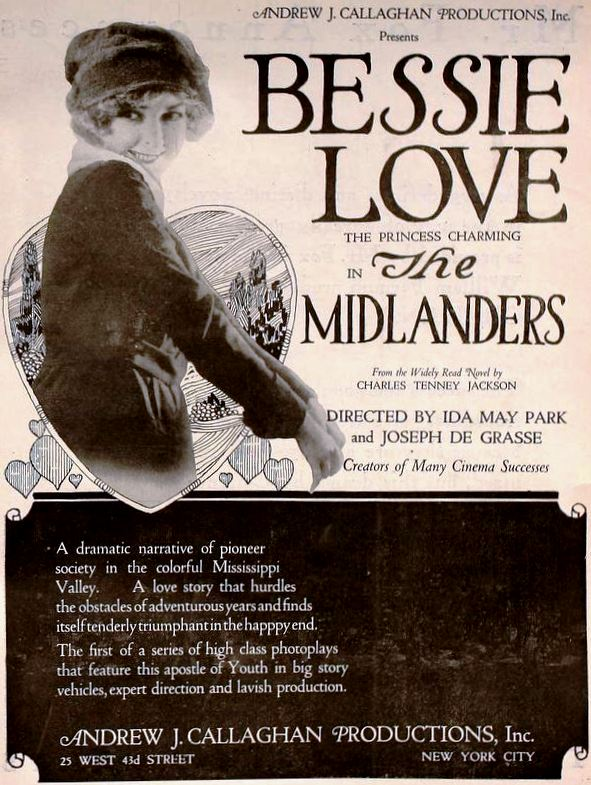
- Magazine advertisement
- Directed by: Joseph De Grasse; Ida May Park
- Written by: Ida May Park (scenario)
- Based on: The Midlanders (novel) by Charles Tenney Jackson
- Produced by: Andrew J. Callaghan
- Starring: Bessie Love
- Cinematography: King D. Gray
- Production company: Andrew J. Callaghan Productions
- Distributed by: Federated Film Exchanges of America, Inc.
- Release date: December 1920
- Running time: 5 reels
- Country: United States
- Language: Silent (English intertitles)
- Budget: $75,000

The Midlanders is a 1920 American silent drama film starring Bessie Love and directed by husband and wife duo Joseph De Grasse and Ida May Park. It was produced by Andrew J. Callaghan Productions and distributed by Federated Film Exchanges of America. It is based on the 1912 novel of the same name by Charles Tenney Jackson, published by Bobbs-Merrill Company.

Only a small fragment of this film is known to survive.

== Plot ==
Aurelie, an orphan from New Orleans, escapes her convent and gets adopted by Mississippi riverboat captain Lindstrom. Hoping to give her a steadier life, he sends her to live with his brother, John Lindstrom, a squatter in a quiet river valley town. As Aurelie grows into a striking young woman, she wins a beauty contest and accepts an offer from a theatrical producer. Her rise to fame is swift. When she returns home, she faces rejection from the townspeople. Two men remain drawn to her: Wiley Curran, the local newspaper editor, and Harlan Van Hart, the judge's college-educated son.

== Cast ==
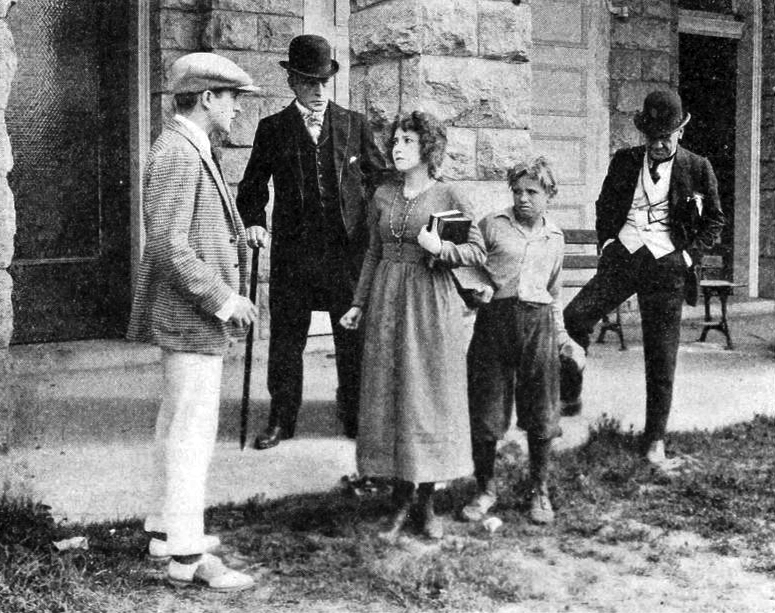
Bessie Love in a scene from The Midlanders

- Bessie Love as Aurelie Lindstrom
- Truman Van Dyke as Harlan Van Hart
- Sydney Deane as Judge Van Hart
- Frances Raymond as Mrs. Van Hart
- Curt Rehfeld as Captain Lindstrom
- C. Norman Hammand as Papa John Lindstrom
- Lloyd Bacon as Wiley Curran
- Jack Donovan as Arne Vance
- Howard Crampton as Boss Tanner
- Bill White as Mins

== Production ==
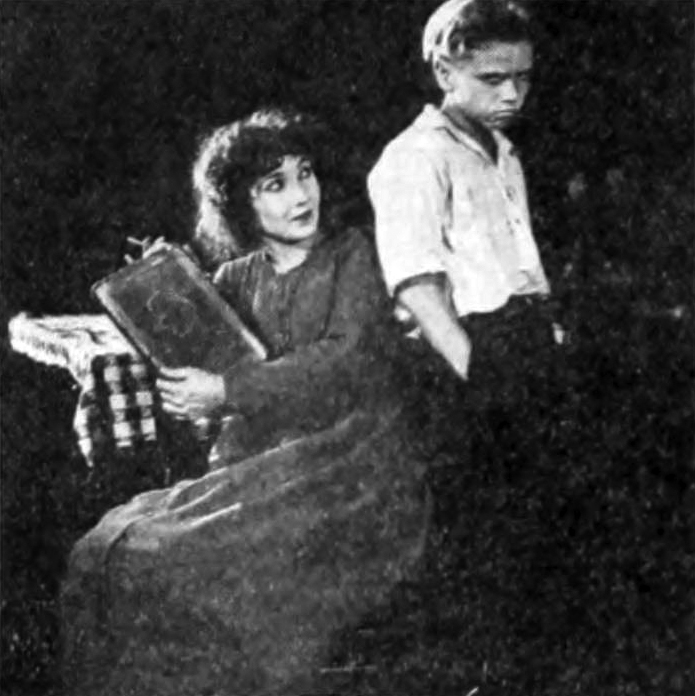
Bessie Love reads a book in a scene from The Midlanders

Interiors were filmed in a studio in Los Angeles, and exteriors were filmed in Rio Vista. To prepare for her performance, Bessie Love took dance classes at Theodore Kosloff's ballet school.

After its release, producer Andrew J. Callaghan sued Federated Film Exchanges, saying that the distributor had not paid the full amount to distribute this film, Bonnie May, and Penny of Top Hill Trail.

== Reception ==
The film received mixed reviews, but Love's performance was highly praised.
