= Rouge and Riches =

1920 film directed by Harry L. Franklin

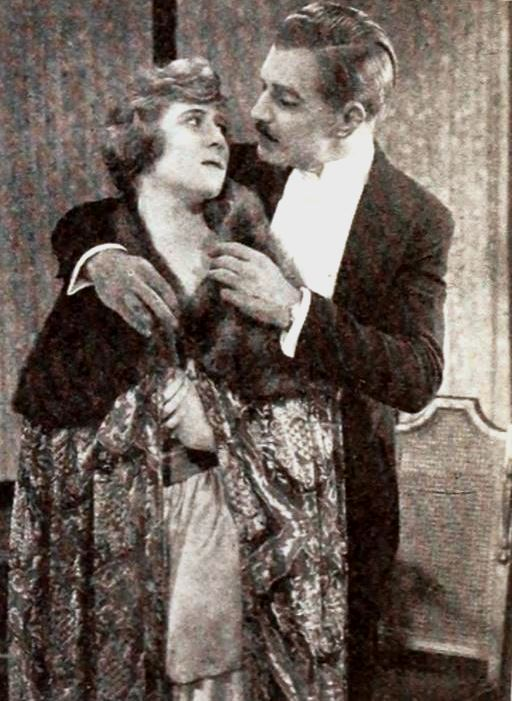
- Mary MacLaren and unidentified player
- Directed by: Harry L. Franklin
- Written by: Hal Hoadley
- Based on: short story Myself Becky by W. Carey Wonderly
- Produced by: Carl Laemmle
- Starring: Mary MacLaren
- Cinematography: Gus Peterson
- Distributed by: Universal Film Manufacturing Company
- Release date: February 9, 1920
- Running time: 6 reels
- Country: USA
- Language: Silent..English intertitles

Rouge and Riches is a lost 1920 silent film drama directed by Harry L. Franklin. It starred Mary MacLaren. It was produced and distributed by the Universal Film Manufacturing Company.

== Cast ==
- Mary MacLaren - Becky
- Alberta Lee - Aunt Lucia
- Robert Walker - Jefferson Summers
- Wallace MacDonald - Tom Rushworth
- Marguerite Snow - Dodo
- Syn De Conde - Jose
- Lloyd Whitlock - Carter Willis
- Dorothy Abril - Kittens Dalmayne
- Harry Dunkinson - Max Morko
- Helene Sullivan - Jane Hamilton
