= The Petal on the Current =

1919 film

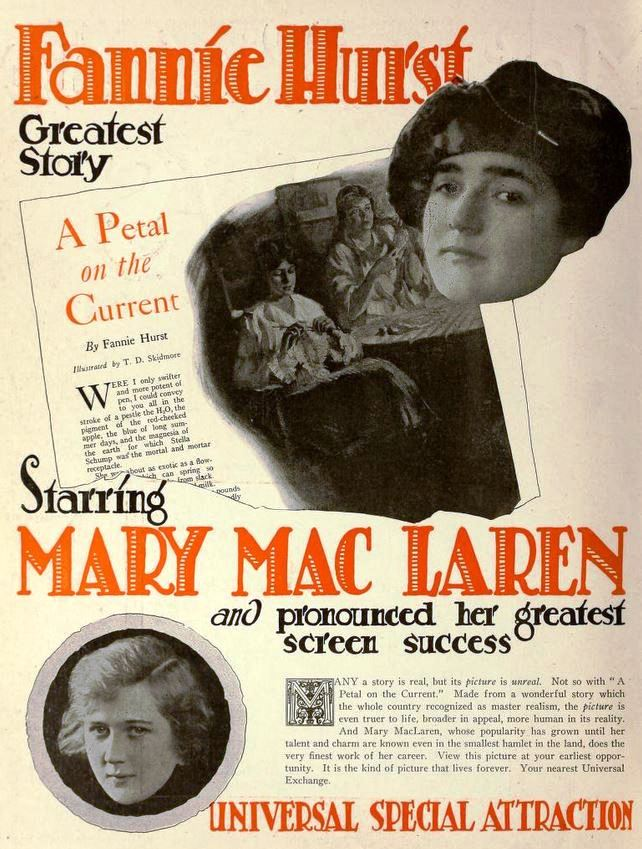
- Ad for film
- Directed by: Tod Browning
- Written by: Fannie Hurst; Waldemar Young
- Starring: Mary MacLaren; Gertrude Claire
- Cinematography: William Fildew
- Distributed by: Universal Film Manufacturing Company
- Release date: August 3, 1919
- Running time: Six reels
- Country: United States
- Language: Silent with English intertitles

The Petal on the Current is a lost 1919 American drama film directed by Tod Browning.

== Plot ==
Based upon a description in a film magazine, Stella Schump is a working girl who, on the advice of a friend Cora, who is attempting to be a matchmaker, attends a party where she is supposed to meet a bashful man. He does not show up, and she has her first drink of beer. This affects her so she becomes dazed, and she leaves for home. A detective comes upon her, and after she repeats bits of conversation she heard at the party, he arrests her for being drunk and for solicitation. A night court convicts her and sentences her to ten days in jail. She writes her mother of her plight, and her mother dies from shock upon reading the letter. After she is let out of jail, she loses her job and, after her money runs out, goes to a park and sits on a bench. A bashful man, who is disillusioned about women, comes by. She has heard of him, but they have never met. He turns out to be a foreman at a factory, and as they talk they realize they were supposed to have met at the party. They leave together and marry.

== Cast ==
- Mary MacLaren as Stella Schump
- Gertrude Claire as Stella's Mother
- Fritzi Ridgeway as Cora Kinealy (as Fritzie Ridgeway)
- Robert Anderson as John Gilley
- Beatrice Burnham as Gertie Cobb
- Victor Potel as Skinny Flint
- David Butler as Ed Kinealy
- Yvette Mitchell (uncredited)
- Janet Sully (uncredited)
