= Bread (1918 film) =

1918 silent film

- Surviving footage from Bread
- Directed by: Ida May Park
- Written by: Evelyn Campbell; Ida May Park
- Starring: Mary MacLaren; Edward Cecil; Kenneth Harlan
- Cinematography: King D. Gray
- Production company: Universal Pictures
- Distributed by: Universal Pictures
- Release date: September 1, 1918
- Running time: 60 minutes
- Country: United States
- Languages: Silent; English intertitles

Bread is a 1918 American silent drama film directed by Ida May Park and starring Mary MacLaren, Edward Cecil and Kenneth Harlan.

Though only a partial print is known to survive, in 2020 the surviving footage was selected for preservation in the United States National Film Registry by the Library of Congress as being "culturally, historically, or aesthetically significant".

== Plot ==
The film follows a woman attempting to pull herself out of poverty as she's savagely exploited by men. Whilst the film ends abruptly, the remainder of the plot has been recorded.

== Cast ==
- Mary MacLaren as Candace Newby
- Kenneth Harlan as Dick Frothingham
- Edward Cecil as Arnold Train
- Gladys Fox as Estelle Payne
- Louis Morrison as Emil Krause

== Bibliography ==
- Donna Kornhaber. Silent Film: a Very Short Introduction. Oxford University Press, 2020.
