= The Grasp of Greed =

1916 film

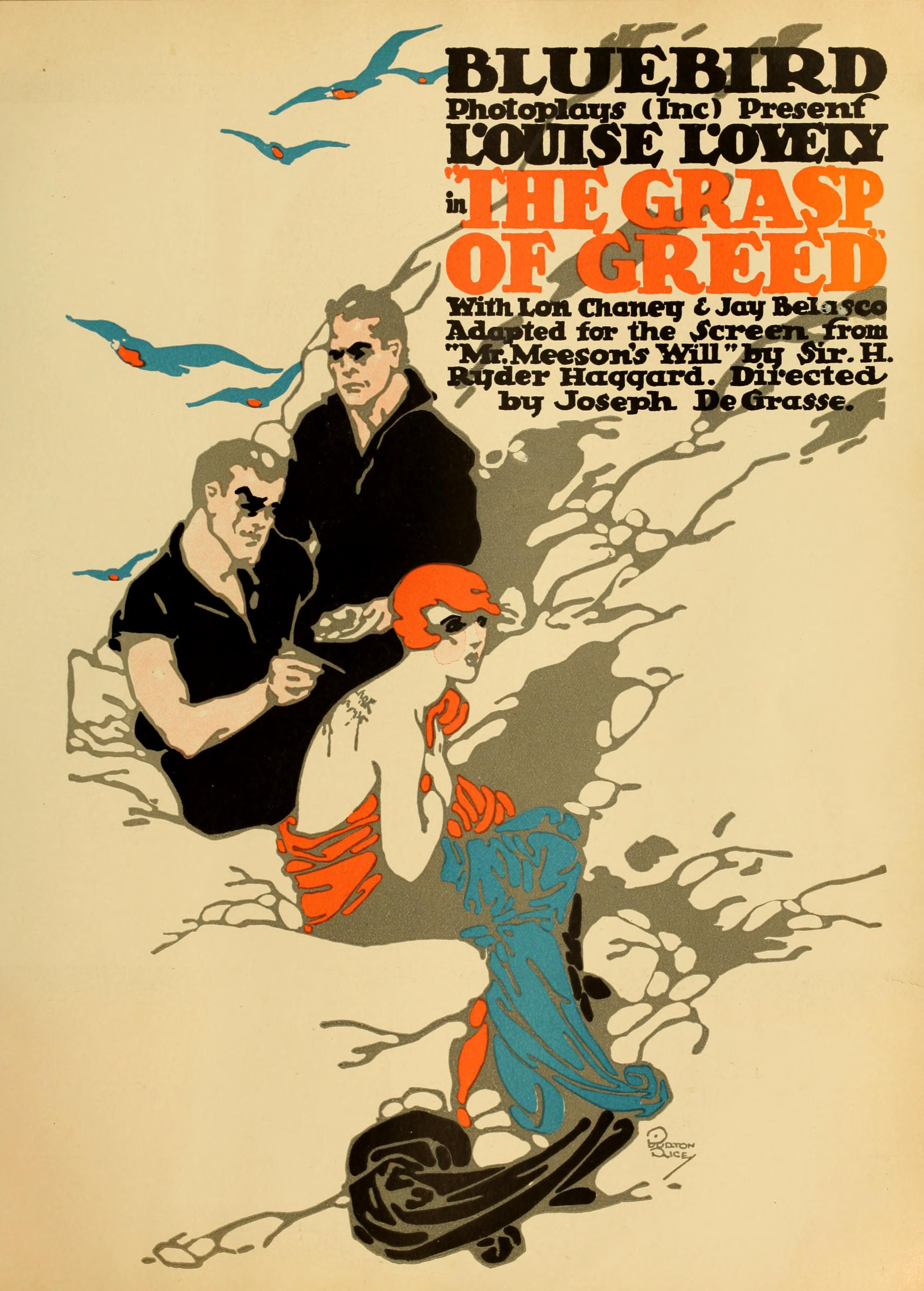
- Film poster
- Directed by: Joe De Grasse
- Written by: Ida May Park
- Based on: Mr Meeson's Will by H. Rider Haggard
- Produced by: Bluebird Film Co.
- Starring: Lon Chaney; Louise Lovely
- Distributed by: Universal Pictures
- Release date: June 17, 1916
- Running time: 5 reels (50 minutes)
- Country: United States
- Language: Silent (English intertitles)

The Grasp of Greed is a 1916 American silent drama film directed by Joe De Grasse, written by Ida May Park, and starring Lon Chaney and Louise Lovely. The screenplay was adapted from an 1888 H. Rider Haggard story called "Mr. Meeson's Will". The film was released in England as Mr. Meeson's Will. The plot concerns a marooned man's will tattooed on the back of a woman. Chaney had a relatively small part in the film, but in one scene, he does a few dance steps, which show off his grace and agility.

An incomplete print of the film exists in the George Eastman House Film Archive (approximately half the film), but it appears all of the Chaney footage is in this surviving portion. Three stills from the film still exist as well, one of which shows Chaney being arrested.

== Plot ==
John Meeson is a skinflint publisher who has acquired the copyright to a book by Alice Gordon for a small sum of money, which she is forced to accept because she so desperately needs the money to care for her invalid sister. When the book becomes a best-seller, Alice tries to get Mr. Meeson to give her some more money. Meeson tells Alice that not only does he own this particular book, but any and all of her future works as well, as specified in the contract she signed. Alice bursts into tears, and Meeson's nephew Eustace, who arrives during the meeting, scolds his uncle for the way he treats his authors. Furious that Eustace has defied him, Meeson rewrites his will and disinherits his nephew.

Alice returns home to discover that her invalid sister has died. Eustace visits Alice and learns of her sister's death, but when he returns a month later, he finds that Alice has left the country. Alice has taken a steamship to Australia planning to sign a deal with another publisher when she gets there, so Meeson books passage on the same boat, hoping to stop Alice from leaving his employ.

Alice is befriended by Lady Holmhurst, who learns that Alice is the author of that "highly acclaimed book the social set is all reading". During the voyage the ship is wrecked, and everyone makes a mad dash for the life boats. Alice saves Lady Holmhurst's son, Dicky, from drowning while Meeson tries to buy a seat for himself in one of the lifeboats. Meeson dives into the ocean in panic but Alice persuades the sailors to save him.

The boat lands on a desert island and Meeson is taken ill. He expresses a desire to rewrite his will, deciding to leave his estate to his nephew after all, but he has nothing to write with! Alice has a sailor named Jimmie tattoo Meeson's entire will on her back before he dies. The sailors drunkenly gamble away their winnings, then gamble for possession of Alice, but as they fight over the frightened young lady, they all fall off a cliff and are killed.

Alice and Dicky are rescued by a passing steamship and arrive in Liverpool. Alice goes to court to display Meeson's final will tattooed on her back and Eustace receives his rightful inheritance. Eustace proposes marriage to Alice, and they settle down in the old Meeson home.

== Cast ==
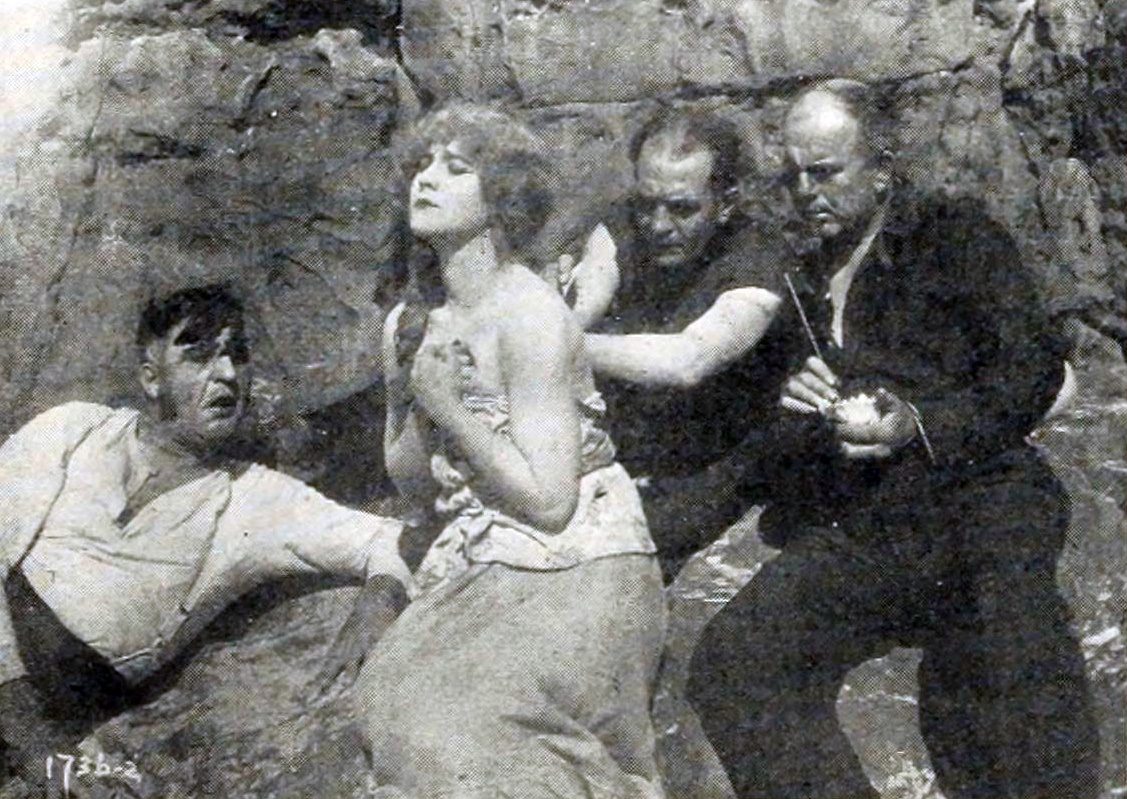
The Grasp of Greed (1916)

- Louise Lovely as Alice Gordon
- C. Norman Hammond as John Meeson, the publisher
- Jay Belasco as Eustace (Meeson's nephew)
- Gretchen Lederer as Lady Holmhurst
- Lon Chaney as Jimmie, the sailor
- Lillian Leighton

== Reception ==
"Wills have been more or less prominent in motion pictures since their inception. But this is probably the first time a document of such legal important has been tattoed on the smooth white back of a young lady. This is the most prominent feature of The Grasp of Greed. Louise Lovely appears as the heroine and it is on her back that the important will is inscribed...Lon Chaney in a comedy role is excellent, while the supporting cast is capable to a satisfactory degree." ---Motion Picture News

"...The joker will not overlook the opportunity for a laugh when the judge orders (the will) to be produced in court, considering that it is tattooed on a young lady's shapely back...The characterization has been nicely handled and presents some fine types. The settings of the production, which are at times very pleasing and appropriate, exhibit at other times a carelessness of detail which is noticeable especially in the cheap quality of curtains, draperies, etc." ---Moving Picture World

"The Grasp of Greed is one of the very best examples of how a scenario reader can go wrong, and the one that picked this novel for the purpose of having a picturization made should be taken into a back yard with the rest of the live stock and penned up there so he can do no further damage in the future." ---Variety
