= The Model's Confession =

1918 silent film

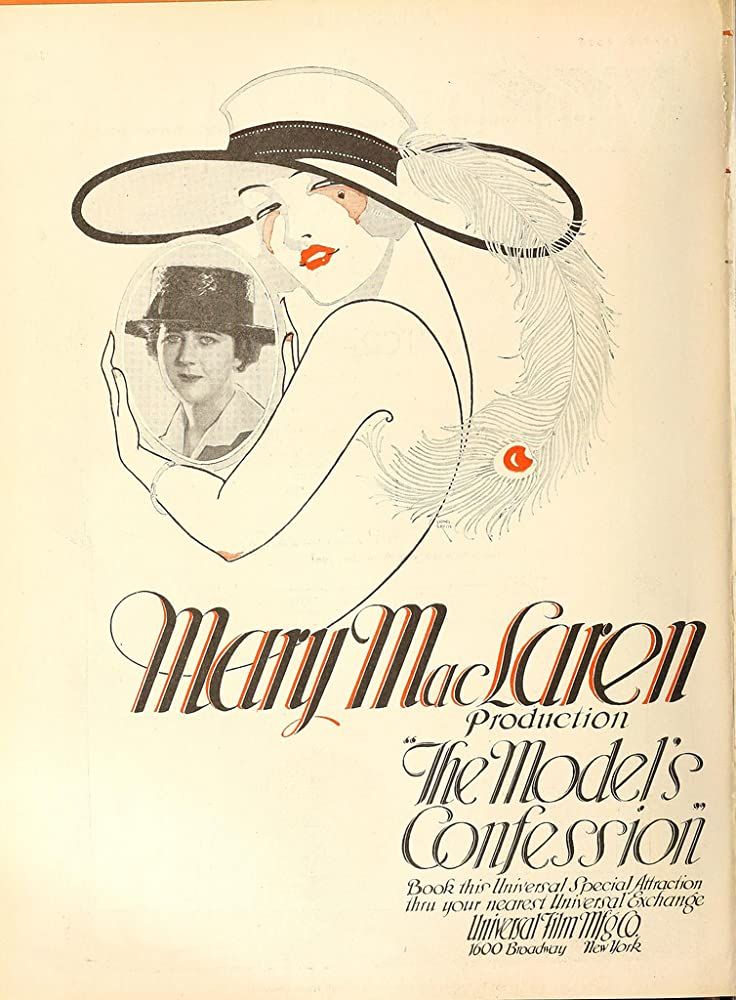
- Directed by: Ida May Park
- Written by: Ruby M. Ayres; Ida May Park
- Starring: Mary MacLaren; Kenneth Harlan; Gretchen Lederer
- Production company: Universal Pictures
- Distributed by: Universal Pictures
- Release date: June 2, 1918
- Running time: 60 minutes
- Country: United States
- Languages: Silent; English intertitles

A Model's Confession is a lost 1918 American silent drama film directed by Ida May Park and starring Mary MacLaren, Kenneth Harlan and Gretchen Lederer.

== Cast ==
- Mary MacLaren as Iva Seldon
- Kenneth Harlan as Billy Ravensworth
- Edna Earle as Rita Challoner
- Herbert Prior as Bertrand Seldon
- Louis Willoughby as Clay Stewart
- Gretchen Lederer as Mrs. Stanley

== Preservation ==
With no holdings located in archives, A Model's Confession is considered a lost film.

== Bibliography ==
- Cooper, Mark Garrett. Universal Women: Filmmaking and Institutional Change in Early Hollywood. University of Illinois Press, 2010.
- Goble, Alan. The Complete Index to Literary Sources in Film. Walter de Gruyter, 1999.
