= The Grip of Jealousy =

1916 film

- Directed by: Joe De Grasse
- Written by: Ida May Park
- Produced by: Bluebird Film Co.
- Starring: Lon Chaney; Louise Lovely
- Distributed by: Universal Pictures
- Release date: February 28, 1916
- Running time: 5 reels (50 minutes)
- Country: United States
- Language: Silent (English intertitles)

The Grip of Jealousy is a 1916 American silent drama film directed by Joe De Grasse, written by Ida May Park and starring Lon Chaney and Louise Lovely. It was based upon Ida May Park's story "Love Thine Enemy". The film is today considered lost. Two stills exist showing Lon Chaney in somewhat different make-ups, one as the character Silas Lacey, and the other as an older version of him.

== Plot ==
The Grant and Morey families have been bitter enemies for generations. Beth Grant and Jack Morey marry secretly, and they leave home when Beth discovers she is pregnant. Her sister Virginia overhears their plans to leave and, unaware that the two are legally married, assumes that Jack has dishonored her sister, whereupon she tells Harry Grant who swears vengeance.

Silas Lacey, a rich farmer, asks Harry for his permission to marry Virginia, but being from a lower social class, Harry rejects him and literally throws Silas out of the house. Lacey kills Harry Grant, and Jack Morey is suspected of the murder having just fled with his secret wife, who later dies giving birth to a daughter.

Virginia believes Beth's daughter is illegitimate and secretly drops the baby off on the doorstep of Lacey's slave Jeff, who adopts the child and names her Linda. Fifteen years pass and Virginia loves Hugh Morey, but she cannot marry him because even after all these years, his brother Jack is still thought to have murdered her brother Harry.

Silas Lacey claims possession of the now teenaged Linda thinking she is the biological offspring of one of his slaves whom he had raped, and exerts legal control over the child. Virginia consents to marry Silas Lacey if he will agree to legally free Linda, but Harvey Lacey (Silas' son) wants Linda for himself and he kidnaps her. He takes her aboard a riverboat where, through considerable coincidence, he finds Jack Morey, who apparently has just been wandering around since the day he left home. Morey rescues Linda and he is exonerated of the 15-year-old murder when Jeff, the slave, presents eyewitness testimony that he saw Silas Lacy kill Harry Grant at the time of the slaying. Jack is reunited with his biological daughter Linda, and Hugh and Virginia get married.

== Cast ==
- Louise Lovely as Virginia Grant
- Lon Chaney as Silas Lacey
- Grace Thompson as Beth Grant
- Jay Belasco as Harry Grant
- Hayward Mack as Phillip Grant
- Colin Chase as Hugh Morey
- Harry Ham as Jack Morey (credited as Harry Hamm)
- Walter Belasco as Uncle Jeff
- Marcia Moore as Lynda
- Dixie Carr as Cora
- Mr. Neff as Harvey Lacey

== Reception ==
"Again the Old South of the days before the war forms the background for a drama in which blood runs hot, slaves are mistreated and bloodhounds are called into play....This subject because of its sensationalism will interest a good many people. The cast is entirely acceptable." --- Motion Picture News

"The picture in its entirety is likely to leave a vague, rather unsatisfactory impression...Whatever criticism the construction of the story may suggest, no fault need be found with the staging and the impressive acting in many of the scenes...Lon Chaney brings out all the ugliness in the character of Lacey." --- Moving Picture World

"The many twists and turns of the plot would consume an abnormal amount of space in the telling. The scenario is chock full of melodramatic action and holds the spectator...The entire cast is uniformly good and the picture is a good program feature from every angle." --- Variety
