= Penny of Top Hill Trail =

1921 silent film by Arthur Berthelet

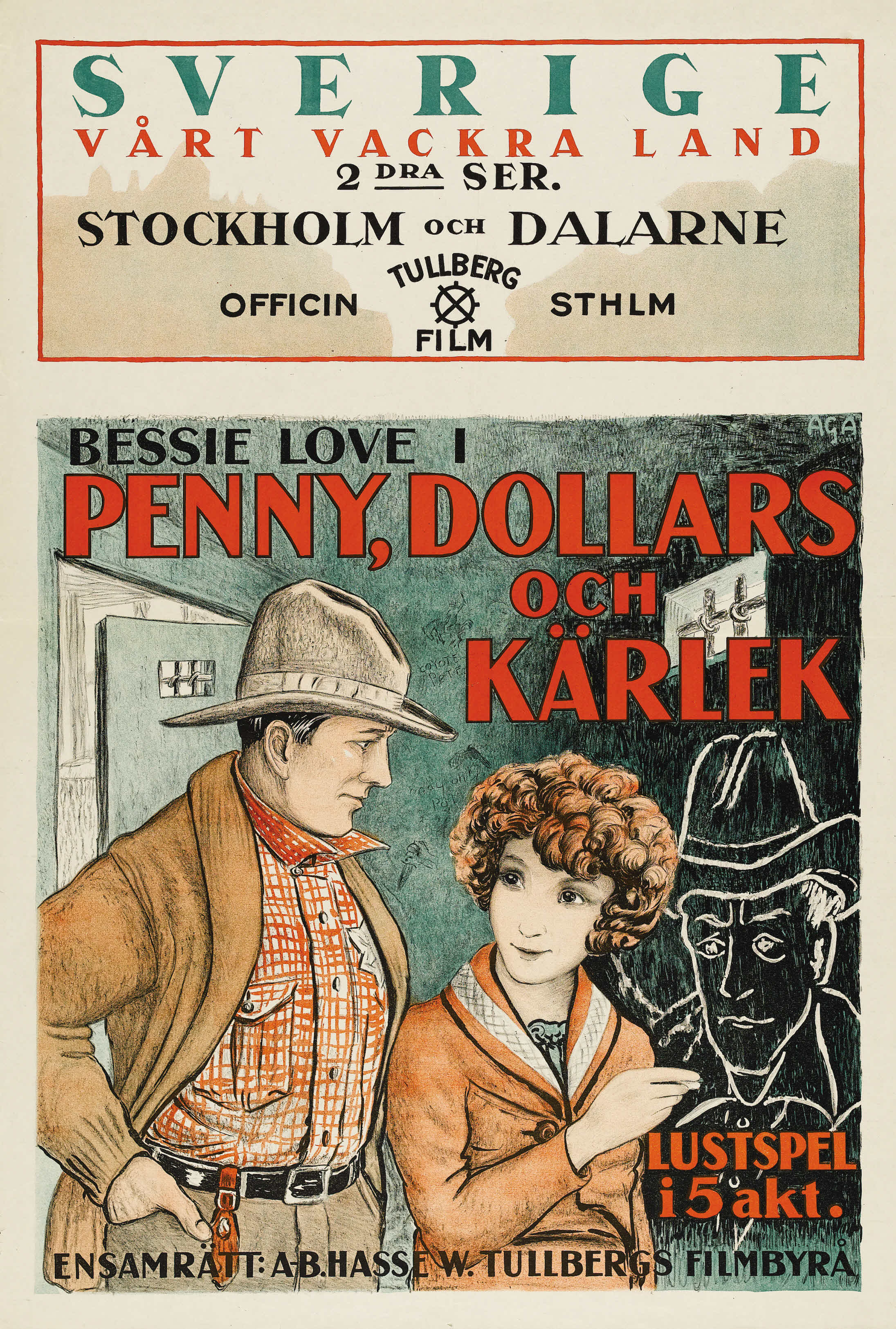
- Poster for the Swedish release of the film
- Directed by: Arthur Berthelet
- Screenplay by: Finis Fox; Beatrice Van
- Based on: Penny of Top Hill Trail (novel) by Belle Kanaris Maniates
- Produced by: Andrew J. Callaghan
- Starring: Bessie Love
- Cinematography: Sam Landers
- Production company: Andrew J. Callaghan Productions
- Distributed by: Federated Film Exchanges of America, Inc.
- Release date: May 7, 1921 (U.S.)
- Running time: 5 reels
- Country: United States
- Language: Silent (English intertitles)
- Budget: $80,000

Penny of Top Hill Trail is a 1921 American silent Western comedy film based on the 1919 novel by Belle Kanaris Maniates. It was directed by Arthur Berthelet and stars Bessie Love. The film was produced by Andrew J. Callaghan Productions and distributed by Federated Film Exchanges of America. The film is presumed lost.

== Plot ==
When Penny goes to a ranch, she is mistaken for a thief. She encounters the ranch foreman, who tries to reform her. When another girl is revealed to be the real thief, Penny's reputation is cleared, and she reveals her true identity: a film actress on vacation. She and the foreman realize their love for each other, and Penny decides to stay on the ranch with him.

== Cast ==
- Bessie Love as Penny
- Wheeler Oakman as Kurt Walters
- Raymond Cannon as Jo Gary
- Harry De Vere as Louis Kingdon
- Lizette Thorne as Mrs. Kingdon
- Gloria Holt as Betty Kingdon
- George Stone as Francis Kingdon
- Herbert Hertier as Hebier

== Production ==
Exteriors were filmed in Tucson, Arizona.

After its release, producer Andrew J. Callaghan sued Federated Film Exchanges, saying that the distributor had not paid the full amount to distribute this film, The Midlanders, and Bonnie May.

== Release ==
Upon its release, some theaters showed the film with The Hope Diamond Mystery and a Ham and Budd comedy.

== Reception ==
The film received positive reviews and was successful at the box office. The wardrobe, atypical for Western films, and Love's frequent hairstyle changes distracted some viewers from the plot.
