= Alas and Alack =

1915 film

- Surviving footage of the film.
- Directed by: Joe De Grasse
- Written by: Ida May Park
- Produced by: Joe De Grasse
- Starring: Lon Chaney; Cleo Madison
- Production company: Rex Motion Picture Company
- Distributed by: Universal Pictures
- Release date: October 10, 1915
- Running time: 20 minutes (2 reels)
- Country: United States
- Language: Silent with English intertitles

Alas and Alack is a 1915 American silent drama short film directed by Joe De Grasse and featuring Lon Chaney and Cleo Madison. An incomplete print of the film survives in the BFI National Archive (one source states the last six minutes of the film are missing).

Chaney showed off his makeup expertise in this film playing a dual role in the film, as both Jess' fisherman husband and "Hunchback Fate" in the fairy tale portion of the film (see Plot). A still exists showing Chaney as the hunchbacked fisherman.

== Plot ==
Jess is the wife of a poor hunchbacked fisherman. She daydreams of being very rich after she sees a beautiful yacht in the harbor. The yacht anchors near the beach while Jess is laboriously mending nets for her husband. The yacht is owned by the wealthy Mr. Charles Holcombe. Despite his wealth, Holcombe is unhappily married to a nagging old wife who spends all her time fussing over her pet dog. Holcombe rows ashore to escape his wife's constant nagging.

Jess' little girl is playing on the beach, and after eagerly listening to the noise in a large seashell, brings it to her mother and asks her to tell her what makes the noise inside the shell. Jess tells her daughter a fairy tale about a beautiful girl who was imprisoned in a seashell by an evil fairy because she dared to love a handsome prince, and the noises they hear inside the seashell is actually the cry of the imprisoned girl. Holcombe comes upon the two women as Jess is relating the fairy tale to her child, holding Holcombe spellbound. The fairy tale then unfolds onscreen, with Arthur Holcombe as the Prince, Jess as a Mermaid, and Jess' fisherman husband as "Hunchback Fate", three characters in her story.

Holcombe talks with the young women and laments that such a beautiful young woman lives such a terrible life. He picks a bouquet of daisies, but having no excuse to linger longer, he returns to his ship, where his wife nags him for being away for so long. As the yacht sails off, Holcombe sits dreaming about how wonderful it would be to have a good wife like Jess, while Jess sits on the shore dreaming of the wealthy man she just met and his beautiful yacht. As she daydreams, Jess' fisherman husband suddenly hands her more nets to mend, rudely returning her to the reality of her tedious, impoverished life.

== Cast ==
- Cleo Madison as dual role as both Jess, the fishermaid and The Mermaid in the fairy tale portion
- Lon Chaney as dual role as both the fisherman (Jess' husband) and "Hunchback Fate" in the fairy tale portion
- Arthur Shirley as dual role as both Charles Holcombe (the millionaire) and The Prince in the fairy tale portion
- Mary Kearnen as dual role as both Jess' daughter and The Fisher Babe in the fairy tale portion
- Margaret Whistler as Mrs. Holcombe (Charles Holcombe's wealthy wife)

== Reception ==
"Written by Ida May Park, and taking a decidedly pessimistic attitude toward life… This is interesting, with Cleo Madison, Lon Chaney and Arthur Shirley in the principal roles." — Motion Picture News.

"Some of the settings are quite novel, though a little dark in places. The story…has a fair degree of interest" — Moving Picture World.
