= Arthur Shirley =

Australian actor (1886–1967)

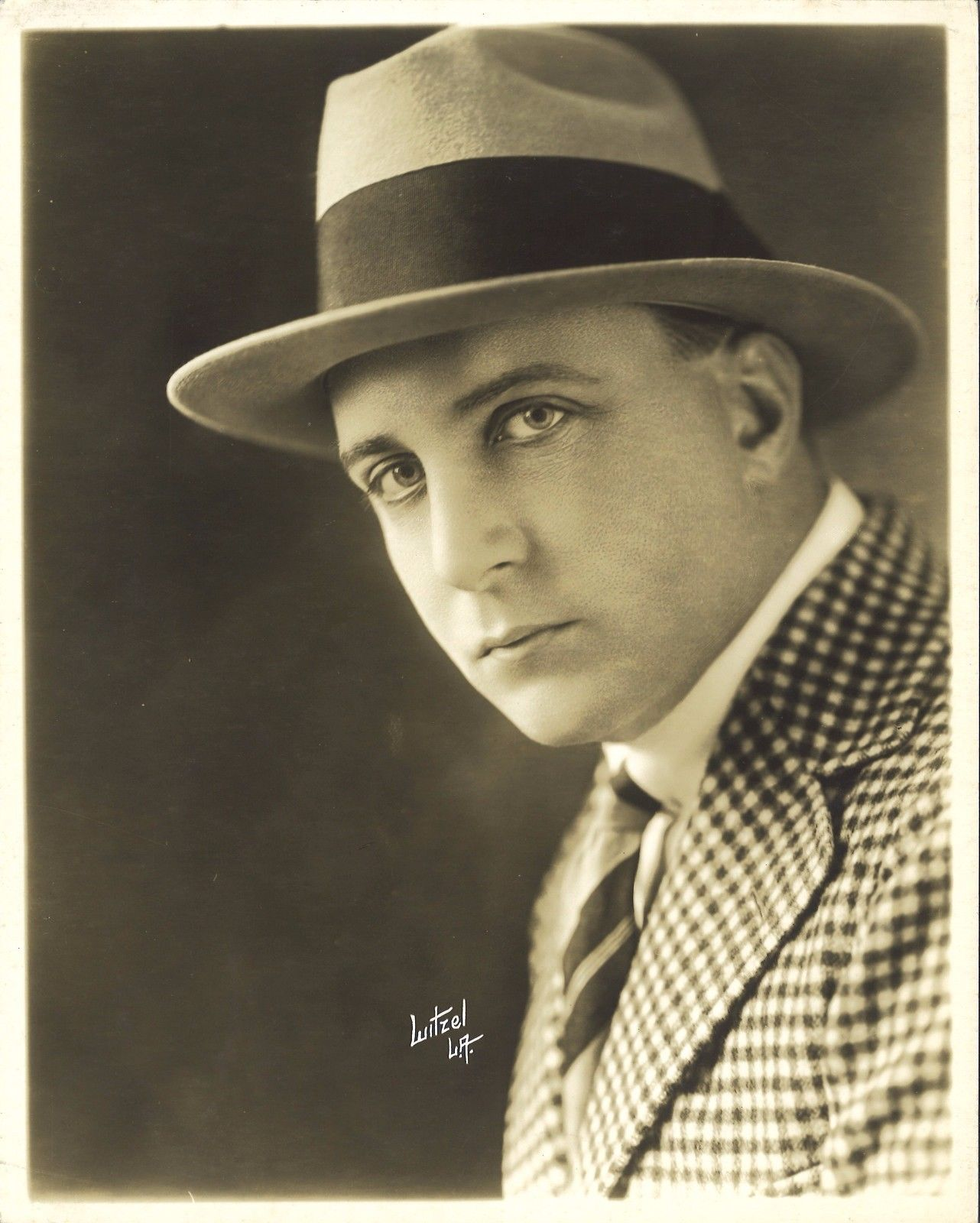
- c. 1916
- Born: Henry Raymond Shirley; 31 August 1886; Hobart, Tasmania
- Died: 24 November 1967 (aged 81); Rose Bay, New South Wales

Arthur Shirley (31 August 1886 – 24 November 1967) was an Australian actor, writer, producer, and director of theatre and film. He experienced some success as a film actor in Hollywood between 1914 and 1920.

== Biography ==
=== Early life ===
Born Henry Raymond Shirley in Hobart, Australia to civil servant Henry Shirley and Sarah Ann Shirley, née Morton, he was baptised Arthur and attended Catholic schools. He then worked for Tattersall's Lottery and as a junior solicitor's clerk, when at age sixteen he decided to join a semi-professional troupe of entertainers which toured Tasmania in a two horse caravan. In 1904 Shirley moved to Melbourne. For a time he worked as door-to-door salesman for a wholesale grocery firm, then he became a novice in a Sydney seminary, but left it in 1905 to try and break into theatre.

In an alternative account, he entered a monastery as a novice at age 17 but three years later left the order before taking his vows.

His first role was a three-line part in Sweet Nell of Old Drury (1905), starring Nellie Stewart at the Princess Theatre in Melbourne. He spent the next two years touring Victoria and New South Wales with the John Cosgrove Company, after which he worked for other theatre entrepreneurs, including William Anderson, George Marlow, Beaumont Smith and George Willoughby. In 1909 he announced he was going to star in a play especially written for him, an early indication of Shirley's later flair for self-promotion.

Shirley owed money to a Miss Tindall, a debt which saw him be declared bankrupt at his own petition in December 1913. He struggled with financial difficulties before winning the leads in two films, The Silence of Dean Maitland and The Shepherd of the Southern Cross, both opening in 1914; the first was a success.

On 22 December 1913 Shirley married New Zealand singer Ellen Newcomb Hall at St Mary's Cathedral in Sydney; they would separate in 1920 and divorce in 1940.

=== Willoughby lawsuit ===
In Christmas 1913 Shirley was working for George Willoughby, who issued a notice to his company that their engagements would terminate at a certain date. Willougby offered Shirley another contract at £4 10 a week but Shirley insisted on £6. Shirley then contacted J. C. Williamson Ltd and said he obtained a position there. A day or two later, Williamsons withdrew their offer to Shirley on the basis that Willoughby had told them he was still under contract to the latter. According to Shirley, Willoughby told him that if he didn't work for the producer, he would make sure Shirley was blacklisted in the industry. Shirley responded by suing Willoughby for £1,000 in damages.

Willoughby argued that Shirley had no contract with Williamsons and was supported by E. J. Tait, managing director of Williamsons. The judge ruled that Tait had been guilty of perjury and the jury awarded Shirley £500 in damages. Willoughby appealed the decision, asking for it to be set aside, and the Judge suggested the parties come to a settlement, which was done.

The money he earned from the lawsuit enabled Shirley to pay off his debts and he appears to have had his bankruptcy discharged. However, Shirley felt his career as a stage actor in Australia had been greatly hurt by taking on two of its most powerful producers and he decided to try his luck overseas.

=== US career ===
In June 1914 Shirley and his wife moved to the United States, where he was signed by Kalem Company in their New York studios. He then went to work in their Glendale studio where he played a detective hero.

He later signed to Universal Studios. He won roles in One Man's Evil (1915), Bawb O' Blue Ridge (1916), The Fall of a Nation (1916) and Branding Broadway (1918) alongside William S. Hart. Of these movies, The Fall of a Nation is the best known, being a sequel to The Birth of a Nation (1914), but Shirley also acted opposite such stars as Lon Chaney, Sr. and Mae Murray.

Shirley also ran a photography business on Hollywood Boulevard, where he was a pioneer in the use of artificial lighting for portraiture, and three-dimensional rather that painted backgrounds. He claimed it was a photograph he took of Rudolph Valentino dancing which helped that actor be cast in Four Horsemen of the Apocalypse (1921), and thus become a star.

=== Return home ===
Shirley returned to Sydney in April 1920 to found his own company, setting up at Rose Bay with the slogan "Moving Pictures Made in Australia for the World". Although one movie, The Throwback, did begin production, he did not complete it and Shirley was declared bankrupt again in 1925 after a court action by his cinematographer, Ernest Higgins.

He managed to recover, playing Steve Gunn in a stage adaptation of The Sentimental Bloke in 1923 and setting up Pyramid Pictures to produce a film based on The Mystery of a Hansom Cab (1925). This was a large hit and remains his greatest achievement. He also wrote, produced, directed and starred in The Sealed Room in 1926 which was less successful.

=== Final years ===
Shirley relocated to London in 1927, and tried to exhibit his two directorial efforts to UK audiences, but was not allowed until he paid the requisite duty. He did not have the funds so this did not eventuate.

He also announced he intended to form Australian National Films, Ltd., with a capital of £600,000, to act as film producers, and as distributors of British films throughout Australia and New Zealand. A company of that name was incorporated the following year but Shirley instead attempted to start a film industry in Rhodesia, starting with a project called Sons of Rhodesia. This did not work out and in September 1930 he moved to Hollywood, where he was arrested in February 1932 for overstaying his visa; however he later obtained permission to stay.

He married Frances Clayton in 1934, apparently believing his first wife to be dead, but returned alone to Sydney later in August that year. When he came off the boat, Shirley was interviewed by police, who wanted to know if he had been deported. He later sued the two offices involved for £5,000 for assault and wrongful arrest but lost the case.

In 1938 Shirley announced he was going to produce a film in Tasmania called Wings of Love but this did not eventuate.

He adopted a son in 1940, and contested the 1943 federal election as an independent candidate for East Sydney. He ran on a platform of the abolition of the entertainment tax and safeguarding of personal liberties, among other things. His campaign manager was arrested during the campaign. Shirley lost the election.

Shirley devoted his retirement to archaeology and ancient Egypt. He died at Rose Bay in 1967 and was buried at Waverley Cemetery.

== Credits ==
=== Theatre ===
- Sweet Nell of Old Drury (1905) – with Nellie Stewart
- The Monk and the Woman (1912)
- The Cowboy and the Squaw (1913)
- The Night Side of London (1913)
- The Road to Ruin (1913)
- The Monk and the Woman (1913, revival)
- A Girl's Temptation (1913)
- My Old Dutch (1919) – with Albert Chevalier
- The Sentimental Bloke (1922–23) – with Bert Bailey
- Sweet Nell of Old Drury (1926, revival)

=== Films ===
- Sixty Years a Queen (1913)
- The Silence of Dean Maitland (1914)
- The Shepherd of the Southern Cross (1914)
- One Man's Evil (1915)
- The Man of Wealth and the Prince (1915)
- Vanity (1915)
- Bound on the Wheel (1915) – with Lon Chaney, Sr.
- Betty's Bondage (1915)
- Mountain Justice (1915) – with Lon Chaney, Sr.
- Quits (1915) – with Lon Chaney, Sr.
- The Pine's Revenge (1915) – with Lon Chaney, Sr.
- The Fascination of the Fleur de Lis (1915) – with Lon Chaney, Sr.
- Alas and Alack (1915) – with Lon Chaney, Sr.
- A Mother's Atonement (1915) – with Lon Chaney, Sr.
- Lon of Lone Mountain (1915) – with Lon Chaney, Sr.
- The Millionaire Paupers (1915) – with Lon Chaney, Sr.
- Under a Shadow (1915) – with Lon Chaney, Sr.
- The Terrible Truth (1915)
- Stronger Than Death (1915) – with Lon Chaney, Sr. and Louise Lovely
- The Fall of a Nation (1916)
- The Valiants of Virginia (1916) – with Kathlyn Williams
- The Wildcat (1917) with Jackie Saunders
- Bawb O' Blue Ridge (1917) – with Bessie Barriscale
- A Bit of Kindling (1917) – with Jackie Saunders
- Betty Be Good (1917) – with Jackie Saunders
- Bab the Fixer (1917) – with Jackie Saunders
- Modern Love (1918) – with Mae Murray
- Branding Broadway (1918) – with William S. Hart
- Roped (1919) – with Harry Carey
- The Triflers (1920)
- The Throwback (1920) (abandoned) – also director, producer
- The Mystery of a Hansom Cab (1925) – also director, producer
- The Sealed Room (1926) – also director, producer
- The Champion (1931)
- Murder in Trinidad (1934)
- Pursued (1934)
