= The Hidden Way =

1926 film by Joe De Grasse

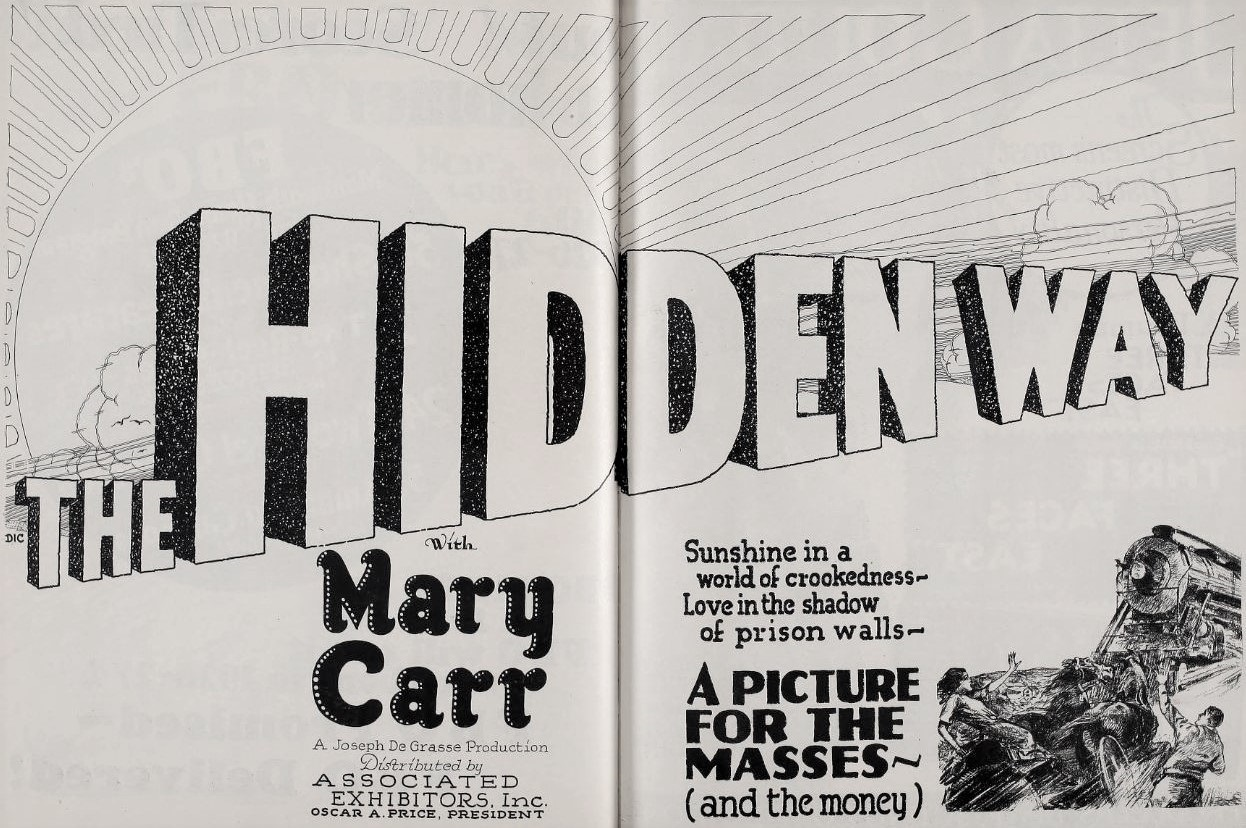
- Advertisement
- Directed by: Joseph De Grasse
- Written by: Ida May Park
- Produced by: Joseph De Grasse
- Starring: Mary Carr
- Cinematography: Joseph Dubray
- Production company: Joseph De Grasse Productions
- Distributed by: Associated Exhibitors
- Release date: July 26, 1926
- Running time: 6 reels
- Country: United States
- Language: Silent (English intertitles)

The Hidden Way is a surviving 1926 American silent crime drama film produced and directed by Joseph De Grasse, written by his wife Ida May Park and starring Mary Carr, Gloria Grey, and Thomas Santschi.

== Plot ==
Two ex-prisoners join the crook. After saving the life of a farm girl, they receive housing from her widowed mother. An elderly man and a con man come up with a plan to trick a generous lady into believing that there is a valuable mineral spring on her land.

== Cast ==
- Mary Carr as Mother
- Gloria Grey as Mary
- Thomas Santschi as Bill
- Arthur Rankin as Harry
- Ned Sparks as Mulligan
- Jane Thomas as The Woman
- Billie Jeane Phelps as The Child
- Wilbur Mack as Sid Atkins
- William Ryno as Samuel Atkins

== Preservation ==
The film was considered lost for decades until a print surfaced in near mint condition in New Zealand.
