= Lamp in the Desert =

1922 film

- Directed by: F. Martin Thornton
- Written by: Leslie Howard Gordon
- Starring: Gladys Jennings; Louis Willoughby; George K. Arthur
- Production company: Stoll Pictures
- Distributed by: Stoll Pictures
- Release date: January 1922
- Running time: 58 minutes
- Country: United Kingdom
- Languages: Silent; English intertitles

Lamp in the Desert is a 1922 British silent drama film directed by F. Martin Thornton and starring Gladys Jennings, Louis Willoughby and George K. Arthur. It was adapted from a 1919 novel by Ethel M. Dell and turned into a script by Leslie Howard Gordon.

== Plot ==
The film is a drama set in India. The story centers around a captain who forces a bigamist to feign death so that he can marry his widow.

== Cast ==
- Gladys Jennings as Stella Denvers
- Louis Willoughby as Captain Everard Monck
- George K. Arthur as Tony Denvers
- Joseph R. Tozer as Captain Raleigh Dacres
- Teddy Arundell as Major Ralston
- Lewis Gilbert as Colonel Mansfield
- Tony Fraser as Waziri spy
- Gladys Mason as Mrs Ralston
