= Vera Willoughby =

British illustrator, painter, and poster artist

- Born: 1870; South Norwood, London, England
- Died: 1939 (aged 68–69)
- Education: Slade School of Art
- Known for: Poster art, painting, book illustration
- Spouse: Louis Willoughby
- Children: Michael Willoughby Althea Willoughby

Vera Willoughby (1870–1939) was a British illustrator, painter, and poster artist. Under the name Vera Petrovna, she also created designs and illustrations of ballet dancers.

== Biography ==
Willoughby was born in South Norwood and educated in London at the Slade School of Fine Art. At the Slade she developed a style with both Cubist and Art Deco elements, which led to a number of poster commissions.

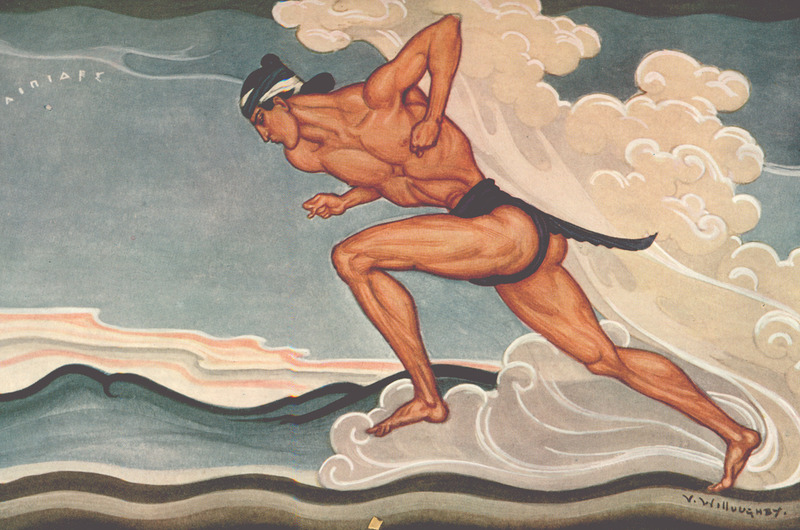
Willoughby's "Marathonikes" from A Vision of Greece (1925)

Willoughby designed posters for the London Underground from 1928 to 1935. She made illustrations for a gift edition of The Odes of Horace, added "curiously stylised illustrations" for a 1929 edition of Pride and Prejudice by Jane Austen, "decorated" a collection of 17th-century love poems, and contributed illustrations for ten books published by Peter Llewelyn Davies, among her many published works. Beginning in 1915, she created cover designs for the catalogues and other publications of specialty bookseller and dance scholar Cyril W. Beaumont, sometimes under the name "Vera Petrovna". She also created wooden souvenir figures depicting dancers Léonide Massine and Lubov Tchernicheva of the Ballets Russes.

Willoughby published Vision of Greece, an illustrated record of her travels in Greece in 1925. "It is a fully sufficient book, even if we only consider its text," commented one reviewer, "but Mrs. Willoughby is one of the most masterly of modern painters, and her book is enormously more attractive by reason of her illustrations."

== Personal life ==
Vera Willoughby's husband was English film actor Louis Willoughby (1876–1968). Their daughter Althea Willoughby (1904–1982) was also an illustrator and designer. During World War I, she lived with young signal officer Peter Llewelyn Davies. Vera Willoughby died in 1939, aged 69 years. Original works by Willoughby are in the collections of the Victoria and Albert Museum and the London Transport Museum.
