= Mountain Justice (1915 film) =

1915 film

- Directed by: Joe De Grasse
- Written by: Ida May Park (screenplay); Jules Furthman (story)
- Produced by: Rex Film Co.
- Starring: Lon Chaney; Elsie Jane Wilson
- Distributed by: Universal Pictures
- Release date: August 15, 1915
- Running time: 2 reels (20 minutes)
- Country: United States
- Language: Silent with English intertitles

Mountain Justice is a 1915 American silent drama film directed by Joe De Grasse and featuring Lon Chaney and Arthur Shirley. It was written by Ida May Park, based on a story by Jules Furthman. The film is now considered to be lost.

== Plot ==
Angus McDonald and Jeffrey Kirke are running an illegal moonshine business. Angus is slow and cautious, while Jeffrey is hot-tempered and treats his wife Mary very poorly. Nora Davison is a local girl who is desperately in love with Angus, but he is only interested in his partner's wife, Mary. One day Jeffrey beats his wife into unconsciousness, and Nora has to physically prevent Angus from killing Jeffrey in a rage. Mary decides to leave her husband, although she still loves him. Angus professes his love to Mary, but she tells him that she still only loves her husband, in spite of the ill treatment she receives from him.

Jeffrey Kirke gets a tip that U.S. revenue officers are going to raid his still. He prepares an ambush in which one of the police officers is killed. Angus captures Kirke and turns him over to the police officers, thinking it to be a convenient way to rid himself of his rival. The local mountain men learn of Angus' betrayal of his partner and plan to hang him. Nora arrives and pleads with them to spare Angus' life. Nora's father holds the mob at gunpoint until they disperse. Afterward, Angus finally realizes his true love for Nora.

== Cast ==
- Lon Chaney as Jeffrey Kirke, moonshiner
- Elsie Jane Wilson as Mary Kirke (Jeffrey's wife)
- Arthur Shirley as Angus McDonald (who loves Mary Kirke)
- Grace Thompson as Nora Davison (who loves Angus)
- George Berrell as Old Man Davison (Nora's father)

== Reception ==
"The plot is somewhat conventional...but it is given a strong handling and contains much that is new and interesting. The characterizations are good and the acting better than usual in this type of story." --- Moving Picture World

"There's gorgeous mountain scenery in this, while the originality of the story and the good acting unite to make the picture very desirable." --- Motion Picture News
