= Lon of Lone Mountain =

1915 film

- Directed by: Joe De Grasse
- Written by: Ida May Park
- Produced by: Rex Film Co.
- Starring: Lon Chaney; Arthur Shirley
- Distributed by: Universal Film Manufacturing Company
- Release date: October 19, 1915
- Running time: 1 reel (10 minutes)
- Country: United States
- Languages: Silent; English intertitles

Lon of Lone Mountain is a 1915 American short silent drama film directed by Joe De Grasse, written by Ida May Park, and featuring Lon Chaney and Arthur Shirley. It only ran one reel. The film is now presumed lost. A still exists showing Lon Chaney in the role of "Lon", the mountain man.

== Plot ==
Melissa lives in a backward mountain community with her stern stepfather, Dan Hadley. Her sweetheart, Lon Moore, is horrified by the beatings Melissa receives from her stepdad. Meanwhile, a handsome new schoolmaster has arrived in the community, and all of the women fawn over him. The schoolteacher takes an interest in Melissa, protects her from abuse and finally induces her to enroll as a student at the school. Lon becomes wildly jealous, and convinces the other men that the schoolteacher is out to steal all of their women. Lon soon realizes however that the teacher actually has good intentions, and when the townspeople make an attempt to kill him, Lon shields the man and is injured himself. Melissa realizes what a good man Lon is, and she decides to go back to him.

== Cast ==
- Marcia Moore as Melissa
- George Burrell as Dan Hadley (Melissa's stepfather)
- Lon Chaney as Lon Moore, a mountain man
- Arthur Shirley as the schoolmaster

== Reception ==
"An unusually pleasing mountain story by Ida May Park. The types are good and the atmosphere unusually pleasing. A good release." --- Moving Picture World

"Lon Chaney endows this backwoods love story with a strong character study. Joe De Grasse produced it so its artistic qualities can best be imagined. It surely is a worthy one-reeler in every one of its major respects." ---Motion Picture News
