= The Plow Woman =

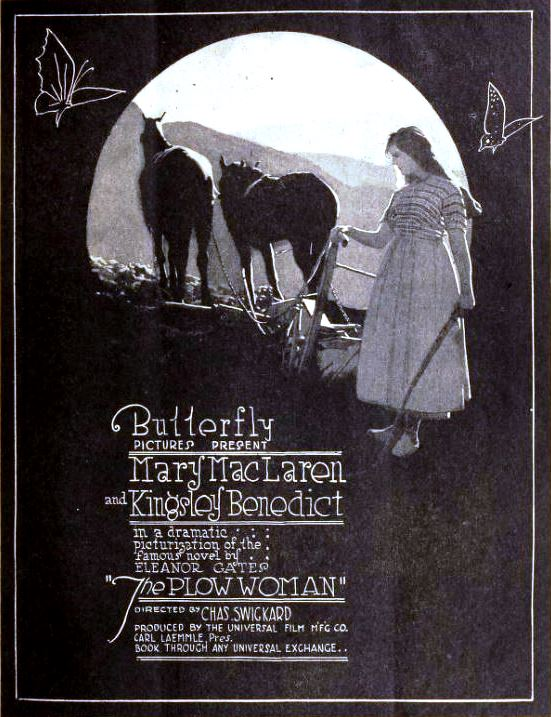
- Directed by: Charles Swickard
- Written by: Eleanor Gates (novel); J. Grubb Alexander
- Starring: Mary MacLaren; Harry De More; Marie Hazelton
- Cinematography: Harry McGuire Stanley
- Production company: Universal Pictures
- Distributed by: Universal Pictures
- Release date: July 2, 1917
- Running time: 50 minutes
- Country: United States
- Languages: Silent; English intertitles

The Plow Woman is a 1917 American silent drama film directed by Charles Swickard and starring Mary MacLaren, Harry De More and Marie Hazelton.

== Cast ==
- Mary MacLaren as Mary MacTavish
- Harry De More as Andy MacTavish
- Marie Hazelton as Ruth MacTavish
- Lee Shumway as Lieutenant Jack Fraser
- Kingsley Benedict as Surgeon Fraser
- Hector V. Sarno as Buck Matthews
- Clara Horton as Mary, as a child
- Eddie Polo as Bill Matthews
- George Hupp as Jack, as a child
- Tommy Burns as Trooper

== Censorship ==
Before The Plow Woman could be exhibited in Kansas, the Kansas Board of Review required the elimination of a scene in reel 4, where soldiers are drinking and gambling.

== Bibliography ==
- Robert B. Connelly. The Silents: Silent Feature Films, 1910-36, Volume 40, Issue 2. December Press, 1998.
