= Amarilly of Clothes-Line Alley =

1918 film directed by Marshall Neilan

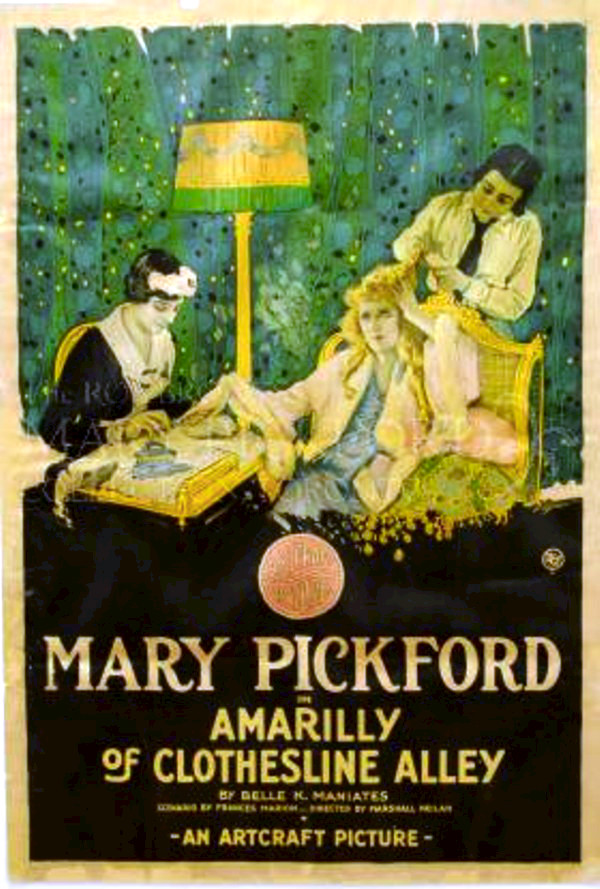
- Film poster
- Directed by: Marshall Neilan
- Written by: Frances Marion
- Based on: Amarilly of Clothes-Line Alley by Belle K. Maniates
- Produced by: Adolph Zukor
- Starring: Mary Pickford; William Scott; Kate Price
- Cinematography: Walter Stradling
- Distributed by: Artcraft Pictures Corporation
- Release date: March 11, 1918
- Running time: 67 minutes
- Country: United States
- Language: Silent (English intertitles)

Amarilly of Clothes - Line Alley

Amarilly of Clothes-Line Alley is a 1918 American silent romantic comedy film starring Mary Pickford that was directed by Marshall Neilan and written by Frances Marion based upon a novel by Belle K. Maniates.

== Plot ==
Set in San Francisco during the early 1900s, the film revolves around Amarilly, the daughter of a widowed scrubwoman. Amarilly is proud of her hard-working Irish family, and takes care of her five roughhouse brothers. She is engaged to bartender Terry McGowan, who gets her a job as a cigarette girl in his cafe after a fire unfairly causes her to lose her job as a theater scrubwoman. While working as a cigarette girl, she meets Gordon Phillips, a handsome and wealthy but frivolous young man, who is a society sculptor.

Terry becomes jealous when Amarilly starts hanging out with Gordon, and he breaks off the engagement. Gordon offers Amarilly a job with his wealthy and snobbish aunt, Mrs. Phillips. When the neighborhood is quarantined after a breakout of scarlet fever, Mrs. Phillips decides to take the time to teach Amarilly high class manners in a Pygmalion-like experiment. However, once she discovers her nephew has fallen in love with Amarilly, she turns against her. Mrs. Phillips tries to humiliate Amarilly by inviting her family over for a social party.

Amarilly is outraged and returns to her old home. She sees Terry and invites him for supper. He is delighted, and on the way to her house, he stops to buy expensive 50 cent violets, even though he had earlier passed up violets at 15 cents. He is shot by accident, and barely makes it to Amarilly's house before collapsing. Terry survives. Amarilly visits him in the hospital and tells him that when he gets out, they have a date at City Hall.

The final scene is five years later. Amarilly is in a sidecar on Terry's motor bike; they both are nicely dressed and seem to be doing well. Then it is revealed under the blanket she has a baby, and behind Terry is a little boy.

== Cast ==
- Mary Pickford as Amarilly Jenkins
- William Scott as Terry McGowen
- Kate Price as Mrs. Americus Jenkins
- Ida Waterman as Mrs. David Phillips
- Norman Kerry as Gordon Phillips
- Fred Goodwins as Johnny Walker
- Margaret Landis as Colette King
- Tom Wilson as 'Snitch' McCarthy
- Wesley Barry as Amarilly's Brother (uncredited)
- Frank Butterworth as Amarilly's Brother (uncredited)
- George Hackathorne as Amarilly's Brother (uncredited)
- Marcia Manon as Woman in Dance Hall (uncredited)
- Antrim Short as Amarilly's Brother (uncredited)
- Gertrude Short as Gossip (uncredited)
- Herbert Standing as Father Riordan (uncredited)
- Larry Steers as One of Gordon's Friends (uncredited)
- Gustav von Seyffertitz as Surgeon (uncredited)
- Leo White as Manicurist (uncredited)

== Reception ==
Like many American films of the time, Amarilly of Clothes-Line Alley was subject to cuts by city and state film censorship boards. For example, the Chicago Board of Censors required a cut, in Reel 1, of a closeup of money in a man's hand and, Reel 4, maid opening door to alleged house of ill-fame and man entering.
