= The Wild Goose (film) =

1921 film

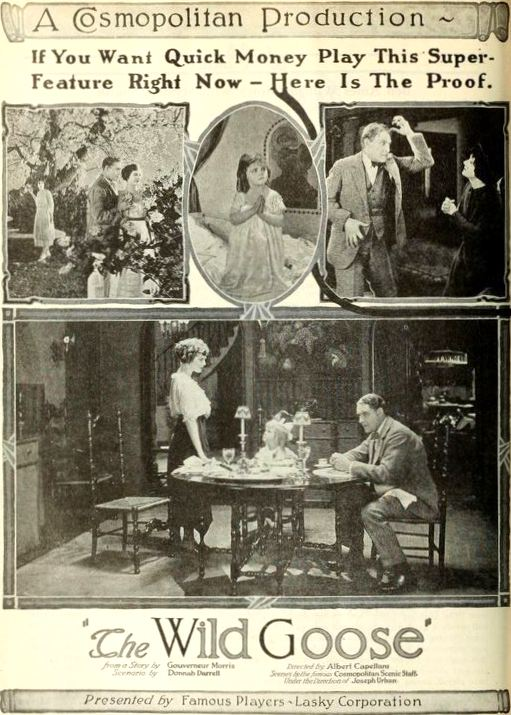
- Ad for film
- Directed by: Albert Capellani
- Screenplay by: Gouverneur Morris
- Starring: Mary MacLaren; Holmes Herbert; Dorothy Bernard; Joseph W. Smiley; Norman Kerry; Rita Rogan
- Cinematography: Harold Wenstrom
- Production companies: Cosmopolitan Productions; Famous Players–Lasky Corporation
- Distributed by: Paramount Pictures
- Release date: June 5, 1921
- Running time: 70 minutes
- Country: United States
- Language: Silent (English intertitles)

The Wild Goose is a 1921 American silent drama film directed by Albert Capellani and written by Gouverneur Morris. The film stars Mary MacLaren, Holmes Herbert, Dorothy Bernard, Joseph W. Smiley, Norman Kerry, and Rita Rogan. The film was released on June 5, 1921, by Paramount Pictures.

It is preserved in the Library of Congress collection as a 35mm nitrate print.

== Cast ==
- Mary MacLaren as Diana Manneers
- Holmes Herbert as Frank Manners
- Dorothy Bernard as Mrs. Hastings
- Joseph W. Smiley as Mr. Hastings
- Norman Kerry as Ogden Fenn
- Rita Rogan as Tam Manners
- Lucia Backus Seger as Nou Nou
