= The Mysterious Mrs. M =

The Mysterious Mrs M. (aka The Mysterious Mrs. Musslewhite)
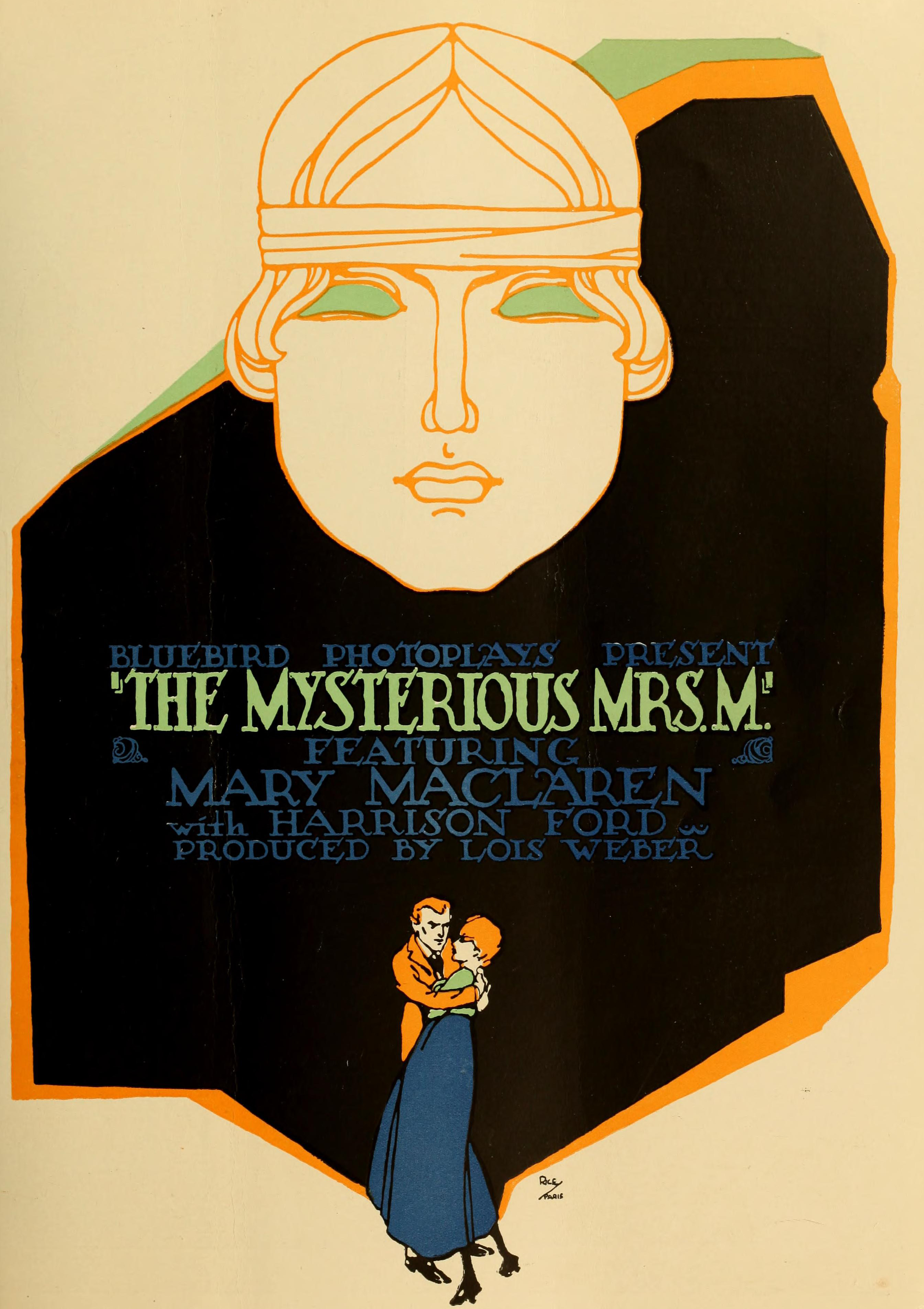
- Directed by: Lois Weber
- Written by: Lois Weber
- Based on: short story by Thomas Edgelow
- Produced by: Bluebird Photoplays
- Starring: Harrison Ford; Mary MacLaren
- Cinematography: Al Siegler
- Distributed by: Universal Film Manufacturing Company
- Release date: February 5, 1917
- Running time: 50 minutes
- Country: USA
- Language: Silent..English titles

The Mysterious Mrs. M is a 1917 silent film drama directed by Lois Weber and starring Harrison Ford and Mary MacLaren. It was a Bluebird Pictures Production distributed by Universal Film Manufacturing Company.

== Cast ==
- Harrison Ford - Raymond Van Seer
- Mary MacLaren - Phyllis Woodman
- Evelyn Selbie - Mrs. Musslewhite
- Willis Marks - Green
- Frank Brownlee - Dr. Woodman
- Bertram Grassby - Clubman
- Charles Hill Mailes - Clubman
- Arthur Forde - unknown role

== Preservation status ==
- The film survives in the Library of Congress incomplete. Reels 1 & 2 survive, reels 3, 4 and 5 are lost.
- Prints and/or fragments were found in the Dawson Film Find in 1978.
