= Althea Willoughby =

British artist; book and magazine illustrator

- Born: 1904; London, England
- Died: 1982 (aged 77–78)
- Other name: Althea Wolton
- Education: Royal College of Art
- Occupation: Illustrator
- Parents: Lewis Willoughby; Vera Willoughby

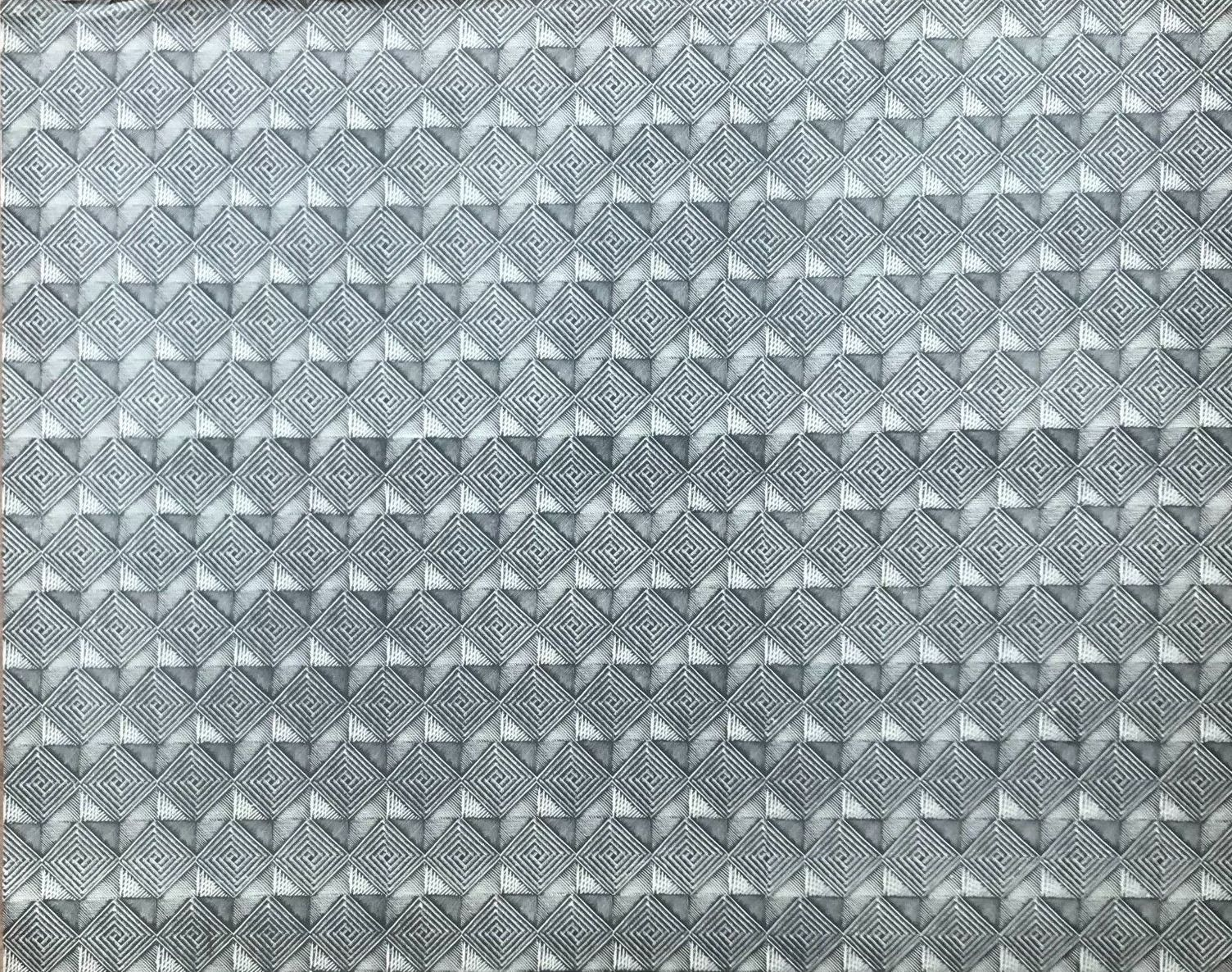
An untitled patterned paper by Willoughby, for the Curwen Press, circa 1930

Althea Willoughby (1904–1982) was a British artist. She worked as a book and magazine illustrator, painted decorative tiles and made wood engravings.

== Biography ==
Willoughby was born in London. Her mother, Vera Willoughby was also a professional illustrator and her father was the actor Lewis Willoughby.

Willoughby was educated at the Royal College of Art during the 1920s. Her work was exhibited at the Redfern Gallery in 1930 and at The British Art in India exhibition of 1935.

Willoughby designed the woodcut frontispiece for Alexander Somerton's The Glades of Glenbella (1929) and illustrated three volumes of Faber and Faber's Ariel Poems: James Stephens' The Outcast (1929), D. H. Lawrence's The Triumph of the Machine (1930), and Henry Newbolt's A Child is Born (1931) She designed posters for London Transport, including Chrysanthemums in London's Parks (1933), and for the Southern Railway. She also designed patterned papers for the Curwen Press.

After marriage, Willoughby was known as Althea Wolton.

Her work is in collections including the Olga Hirsch Collection of Decorated Papers at the British Library, and that of the Victoria and Albert Museum.
