= Marcia Moore (actress) =

American film and theatre actress

- Moore c. 1916
- Born: Ishpeming, Michigan, U.S.
- Occupation: Actress
- Years active: 1913–1922

Marcia Moore was an American film and theatre actress in the early 1900s. She had leading roles in multiple productions, including early silent films and vaudeville theatre. Despite the wishes of her father for her to study piano and become a music teacher, Moore's early interest in the stage led her to gather enough money to move to Chicago in order to study the arts at a conservatory there and then join the theatre. She moved between film and stage roles several times throughout her career, including later joining performances in burlesque shows.

== Childhood and education ==
Raised in Ishpeming, Michigan, by her mother Katherine Moore, a well-known comedian from England and her father, Moore became interested in theatre at the age of eleven after seeing a musical comedy for the first time. While her father wanted her to become a pianist and had her study how to play from childhood through high school, she actively disliked the instrument. After her piano teacher heard her sing and recommended to her parents that she receive vocal lessons, they set her up with an additional instructor. Her initial stage performance was in her senior year of school, where she performed at the Ishpeming Opera House for the class play, The Little Tyrant, as the prima donna.

Moore was well received in local reviews, but her father still refused to discuss the subject and planned to have her attend Lawrence University to study to become a music teacher. An incident with her father's investments, however, just before the school year meant the family had no money to send her to college. A family friend offered to have her be a primary teacher for the school set up at the mining operation that he owned, which she did for a year. This allowed her to save enough money to travel to Chicago and attend the Lyceum Arts Conservatory while studying "voice and dramatic art". To keep paying for her studies, she also did cabaret performances on the side.

== Career ==
Afterwards, Moore began performing in vaudeville theatre during her late teens and early twenties, taking on child roles that also featured her ability to dance and sing. Her early years involved performing with the Barber stock company in South Bend, Indiana. Moore went on to join the Otis Oliver stock company in 1913 to perform in Lafayette, Louisiana. Returning to Chicago soon after, she first began appearing in early films with Essanay Studios. Several years later, she left movie performances and returned to the theatre, appearing in the lead role for A Little Mother To Be in 1918. She had a number of other appearances in the following year across the B. F. Keith Circuit, before she started appearing in burlesque theatres as a part of the Al Reeves' Beauty Show in 1919 as a comedian singer. By 1922, she had returned to the film stage and had become the leading woman for the Charlton Film Company, noted for the large amount of gowns she required for her costumes.

== Filmography ==
- Like Darby and Joan (1913)
- The War of the Cattle Range (1913)
- An Arrowhead Romance (1914)
- The Heart of a Cracksman (1914)
- The Woman Who Lied (1915)
- The Meddlers (1915) as Adelaide Main
- The Heart of Maryland (1915) as Nannie McNair
- Lon of Lone Mountain (1915) as Melissa
- The Millionaire Paupers (1915) as Mabel
- The Second in Command (1915) as Nora Vining
- Kitty from the City (1916) as Kitty
- Lavinia Comes Home (1916) as Lavinia
- Borrowed Plumes (1916) as Polly
- The Grip of Jealousy (1916) as Linda
- Just Yet, But Not Quite (1916)
- Twice At Once (1916)
- The Speed King (1916)
- Her Soul's Inspiration (1917) as Zella
- A Box of Tricks (1917)
- Don't Flirt (1918) as Mrs Cornelius Van Soup

== Theatre ==
- Mother Goose Girls (1913) as Miss Muffet
- A Little Mother To Be (1918) as the mother
- Slumming (1920)
- Private Property (1920)
- The Whirl of the Town (1921)
- East is West (1922)
