= Mary MacLaren =

American actress (1900–1985)

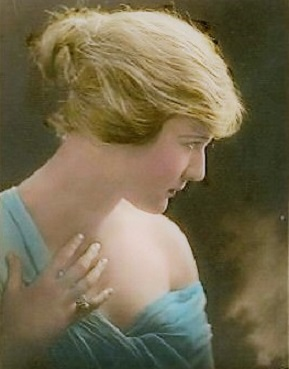
- MacLaren, 1916
- Born: Mary Ida MacDonald (McDonald in some records); January 19, 1900; Pittsburgh, Pennsylvania, U.S.
- Died: November 9, 1985 (aged 85); Hollywood, California, U.S.
- Occupation: Actress
- Years active: 1916-1949
- Spouse(s): George Herbert Young (m. 1924; div. 1928); Robert S. Coleman (m. 1965; ?)
- Relatives: Katherine MacDonald (sister, also actress)

Mary MacLaren (born Mary Ida MacDonald, also credited Mary McLaren; January 19, 1900 – November 9, 1985) was an American film actress in both the silent and sound eras. (Note: Official documents, including census and marriage records, confirm 1900 as MacLaren's birth year, as do other unofficial references such as obituaries and MacLaren's grave marker in California. The earliest, most reliable documentation regarding her birth year are the federal census of 1900 and 1910, both of which document 1900. The original census page of June 1900, records Mary MacDonald's [McDonald’s] age at that time as "6/12" (six months old). While one official record, her 1985 California death certificate, does cite her birthday as January 19, 1901, no government record has been found that documents her birth year prior to 1900. Some secondary sources state that Mary began her career as a chorus girl on Broadway "at the tender age of 13". For performers that young, it was not an uncommon practice in the early 1900s for stage and film producers to "back date" biographical information about their employees, presenting them to be older than their true age.) She was the younger sister of actresses Miriam and Katherine MacDonald and appeared in more than 170 films between 1916 and 1949.

== Early life and stage work ==
Born in Pittsburgh, Pennsylvania, MacLaren was the youngest of three daughters of Lillian Edith (née Agnew) and William Albert MacDonald. Her two sisters, Miriam and Katherine MacDonald, also became actors, and another sibling, her brother Edward, died at birth in 1901, 14 months after MacLaren was born. (Note: Katherine MacDonald had a successful and fairly long film career, but sister Miriam retired from acting in 1919, at the age of 23, when she married Horace Clyde Balsley.) Federal census records for 1900 document that MacLaren's father supported his family working as the proprietor of a hotel in Pittsburgh. By 1910, however, her parents had divorced, and Lillian worked as a dressmaker to support her daughters. Before moving with her mother, Miriam, and Katherine to New York City around 1913, MacLaren obtained her basic education in Greensburgh (now Greensboro), Pennsylvania.

Once situated in New York, all three girls began working either in modeling, performing on stage in minor acting roles, or dancing in revues. MacLaren began her own stage career at the Winter Garden in New York City with Al Jolson in The Passing Show of 1914 and Dancing Around.

== Films ==
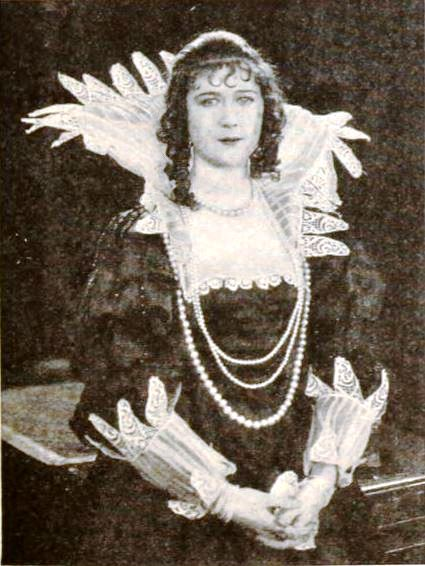
MacLaren as Queen Anne in The Three Musketeers (1921)

MacLaren's screen career began in 1916 with Shoes. She subsequently performed in productions for the Universal Film Manufacturing Company, including Idle Wives (1916), The Plow Woman (1917), The Model's Confession (1918), The Petal on the Current (1919), The Unpainted Woman (1919), Bonnie Bonnie Lassie (1919), Rouge and Riches (1920), and many others. Among her more notable film roles is her performance as Queen Anne of Austria in the 1921 Douglas Fairbanks production of The Three Musketeers.

In studio directories and trade publications, the 5'3" MacLaren was described as having blue eyes and "masses of blond hair" and being an accomplished swimmer and tennis player. While the height of her screen career was in the silent era, she successfully transitioned into sound productions and continued to perform periodically in films throughout the 1930s and into the early 1940s.

== Later years and death ==
MacLaren was a vegetarian and advocate of animal welfare. She had four cats and five dogs and was known to have slept on a rotted mattress. In 1979 in California, the long-retired actress resisted attempts by Los Angeles County officials to declare her mentally incompetent and to assume control of her finances due to repeated charges that she was living in her "dilapidated home" with too much clutter and too many pets. She appeared before the Superior Court commissioner who ruled that she was capable of managing her own affairs.

MacLaren, at age 85, died of "respiratory problems" at West Hollywood Hospital in California in November 1985.

== Selected filmography ==
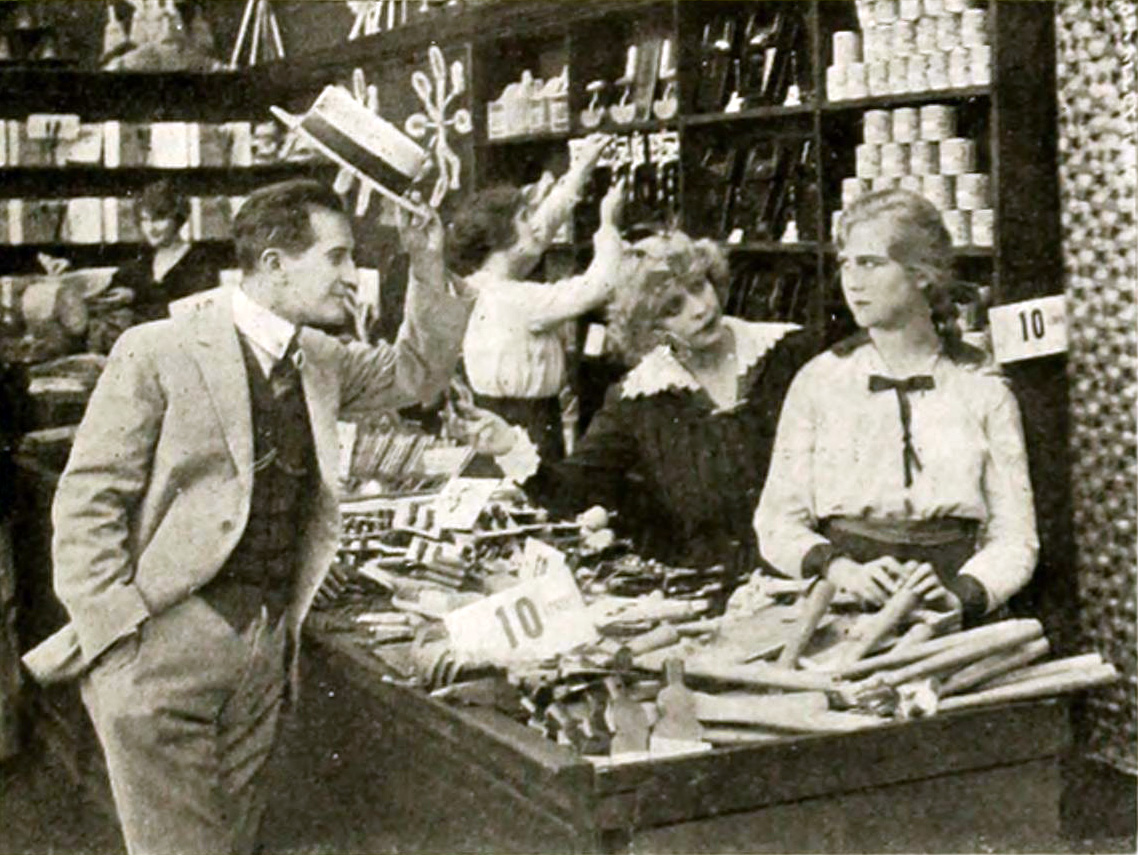
MacLaren opposite actor William V. Mong in Shoes (1916)

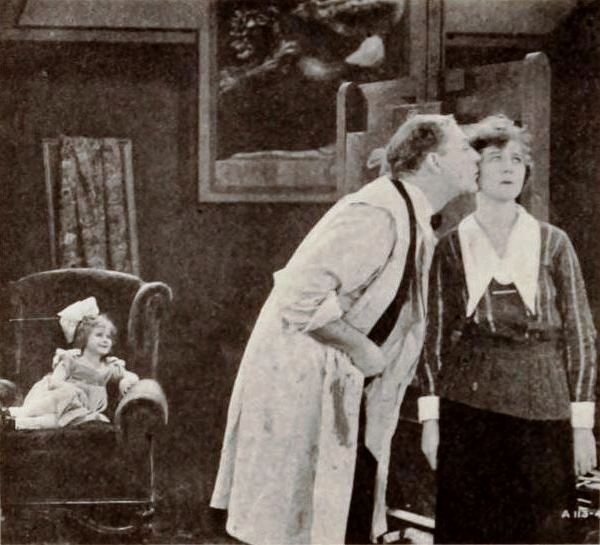
MacLaren with Holmes Herbert and child actress Rita Rogan in The Wild Goose (1921)

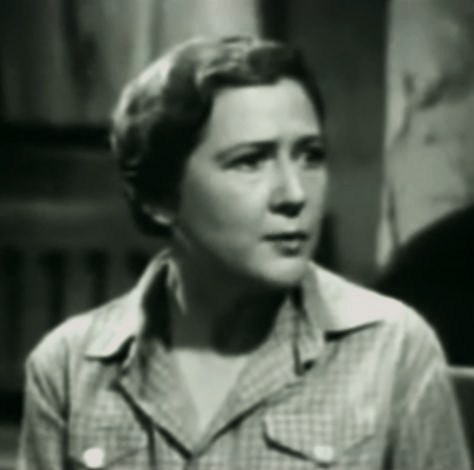
A Lawman Is Born (1937)

- John Needham's Double (1916)
- Where Are My Children? (1916)
- Shoes (1916)
- Saving the Family Name (1916)
- The Mysterious Mrs. M (1917)
- Money Madness (1917)
- The Plow Woman (1917)
- The Model's Confession (1918)
- Bread (1918)
- The Vanity Pool (1918)
- The Unpainted Woman (1919)
- The Petal on the Current (1919)
- Bonnie Bonnie Lassie (1919)
- The Pointing Finger (1919)
- Rouge and Riches (1920)
- The Forged Bride (1920)
- The Road to Divorce (1920)
- The Three Musketeers (1921)
- The Wild Goose (1921)
- Across the Continent (1922)
- The Face in the Fog (1922)
- Under the Red Robe (1923)
- On the Banks of the Wabash (1923)
- The Uninvited Guest (1924)
- The Phantom Broadcast (1933)
- Headline Shooter (1933)
- Westward Ho (1935)
- The New Frontier (1935)
- Saddle Aces (1935)
- Chatterbox (1936)
- King of the Pecos (1936)
- What Becomes of the Children? (1936)
- Reckless Ranger (1937)
- 52nd Street (1937)
- A Lawman Is Born (1937)
- The Fargo Kid (1940)
- Prairie Pioneers (1941)
