= The Sealed Room (1926 film) =

1926 film

- Everyone's 13 January 1926
- Directed by: Arthur Shirley
- Written by: Arthur Shirley
- Produced by: Arthur Shirley
- Starring: Arthur Shirley
- Cinematography: Lacey Percival
- Production company: Pyramid Pictures
- Distributed by: Union Theatres
- Release date: 3 July 1926
- Running time: 7,000 feet
- Country: Australia
- Languages: Silent film English intertitles

The Sealed Room is a 1926 Australian silent film directed by and starring Arthur Shirley. It is considered a lost film.

== Synopsis ==
Paul Craig (Arthur Shirley) is an aviator-inventor who becomes blind due to overwork. He stumbles into a room as a person is being killed by foreign agents – who decide to let Craig live because he cannot identify them. The murder is part of a plot to overthrow the monarchy of fictional Ruvania.

Paul regains his sight and marries Angela (Grace Glover), whose brother was killed by the gang, and who is the ward of Carlo Gelmini (George Bryant), head of the gang. Angela lost her memory with the shock of her brother's death but manages to recover it and help Paul save Ruvania.

== Cast ==
- Arthur Shirley as Paul Craig
- Grace Glover as Angela Scardon
- George Bryant as Carlo Gelmini
- Nellie Ferguson as Della Giovanna
- Cora Warner
- Leslie Woods
- Cecil Scott
- Carlton Stuart
- Eric Harrison
- Muriel Veck
- John Bruce
- Harry Halley
- Walter Bentley

== Production ==
Filming began in May 1925 at Australasian Films' studio in Rushcutters Bay and on location in the Blue Mountains. One scene included a recreation of William Shakespeare's Julius Caesar.

Shirley was assisted in production by Scott Alexander.

== Release ==
Everyone's 26 May 1926

=== Critical ===
Viewing a preview, a writer for trade paper Everyone's called the film a "drama of an exceptionally unique character" in which "the plot is full of intrigue and mystery, with Arthur Shirley giving a very fine characterisation.... one congratulates Pyramid Productions in their determination to make bigger and better pictures."

A critic for the same paper said "the element of mystery is well sustained to the finish, which brings retribution to the villain in a manner most unexpected" with "a most exciting and daring finish."

The Bulletin critic said the film "contains crude excitement enough; but why republican plotters against the throne of Ruvania... should choose Australia as a plotting-ground is inexplicable" and felt Shirley's acting was "woodenly:" although "George Bryant is better; and the feminine parts are well portrayed by Nellie Ferguson and Grace Savieri."

=== Box office ===
The film was not a success at the box office although the opening night drew strong crowds.

Shirley was unable to make his planned version of J. H. M. Abbott's novel Castle Vane called 1840. He left Australia and went to England and Rhodesia to launch a new production company.

== Lawsuits ==
After the release of the film, Shirley went to London taking prints of Sealed Room and Mystery of the Hansom Cab. On arrival he was unable to pay the required duty. The films were impounded. Shirley attempted to get this overruled but was unsuccessful. He was imporisoned for making a scene in the Strangers' Gallery then released after paying a fine of £lO.

Shirley was sued by Hugh Wilson for distribution of this film and The Mystery of Hansom Cab.
