= The Throwback (unfinished film) =

- Directed by: Arthur Shirley
- Written by: Pat O'Cotter
- Produced by: Arthur Shirley; Ernest Higgins
- Cinematography: Ernest Higgins
- Edited by: Arthur Shirley
- Production company: Arthur Shirley Productions
- Release date: 1920 (intended)
- Running time: incomplete
- Country: Australia
- Language: English

The Throwback was a proposed Australian feature film shot in 1920 from director Arthur Shirley. It was also known as The Comeback. Although the movie was not completed, eleven minutes of footage from it survive today.

== Background ==
Shirley spent 1914 to 1920 working in Hollywood before returning to Australia. He announced he was going to form Arthur Shirley Productions, a company worth £100,000, to make movies for worldwide distribution and had bought a building in Rose Bay to use as a studio. Their first production was to be The Throwback, written by Pat O'Cotter, a writer for the Saturday Evening Post. Shirley also intended to make two other films, set in Tasmania – an adaptation of The Captive Singer by Marie Bjelke-Petersen, and an unnamed story set on the west coast.

== Production ==
The Throwback started filming, with Shirley having hired Ernest Higgins as cinematographer and brought over Lawson Harris from the US to assist as production manager. However, the company went into liquidation before the film was completed. Shirley and Higgins attempted to complete the film with financing from the latter. However Higgins and Shirley began to have artistic disagreements: in particular, the religious Higgins objected to semi-nudes of a mural that had been painted for a cabaret scene and had concerns over the emphasis on dancing girls who appeared in the movie. Shirley and an actress, Vera Remee, sued Higgins for salary; he refused to pay and kept the reels of film.

== Lawsuit ==
Shirley ended up suing Higgins for £1,000 in damages for alleged breach of contract and for the detention of certain films and plates in connection with the movie. Shirley claimed that Higgins had promised to pay money for the preparation and production of the movie to a maximum of £600. Higgins argued that Shirley had departed from the arrangement between them without his consent, and that he had disagreed with Shirley during filming over scenes that were shot, including the substitution of the female actors.

The jury eventually found for Higgins, and awarded him costs. As a result, Shirley declared bankruptcy for the second time in his life, claiming he was the victim of Higgins' "hate, spleen and malice".

Shirley attempted to revive the film in 1925 but appears to have been unsuccessful.
