= Mr Meeson's Will =

1888 novel by Henry Rider Haggard

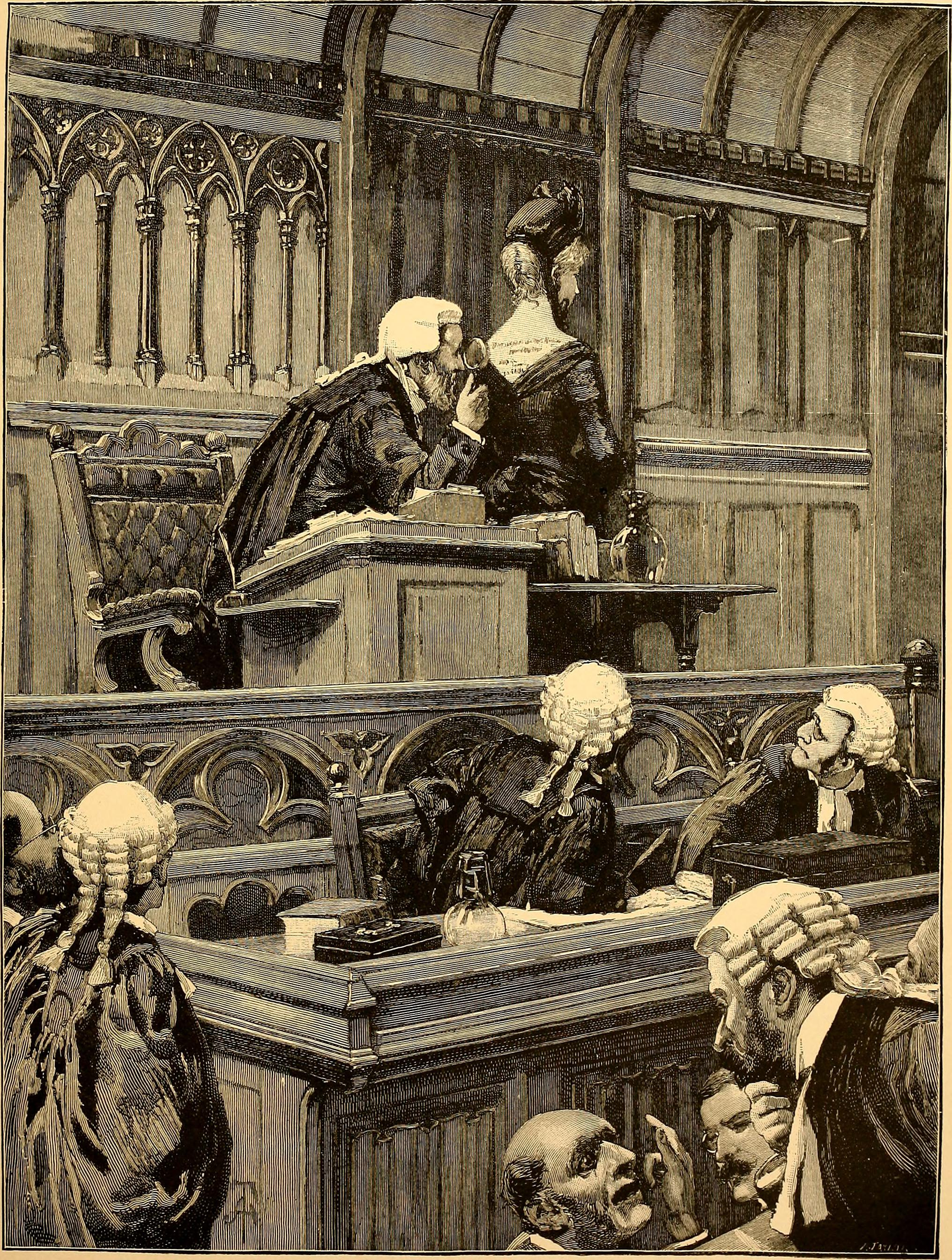
- Meeson's will tattooed on the back of Augusta Smithers
- Author: H. Rider Haggard
- Language: English
- Publication date: 1888
- Publication place: United Kingdom

Mr Meeson's Will is an 1888 novel by H. Rider Haggard. It was based on a well known anecdote of the time. The plot concerns a marooned man's will tattooed on the back of a woman.

== Adaptation ==
It was turned into silent films in 1915 and 1916 (as The Grasp of Greed with Lon Chaney).
