= Marvellous Melbourne =

- Directed by: Cosens Spencer
- Produced by: Cosens Spencer
- Cinematography: Ernest Higgins
- Distributed by: West's Pictures
- Release date: 1910
- Running time: 15 mins
- Country: Australia
- Languages: Silent film English intertitles

Marvellous Melbourne: Queen City of the South is a 1910 documentary of Melbourne that takes the audience through the hotspots of its central business district and surrounding features. Published in 1910, the film stands as the oldest surviving documentary of the city. It is currently housed at the National Film & Sound Archive in Pyrmont, Sydney. At the time of filming, Melbourne was the federal capital of Australia, until the development of Canberra in 1927.

== Overview ==
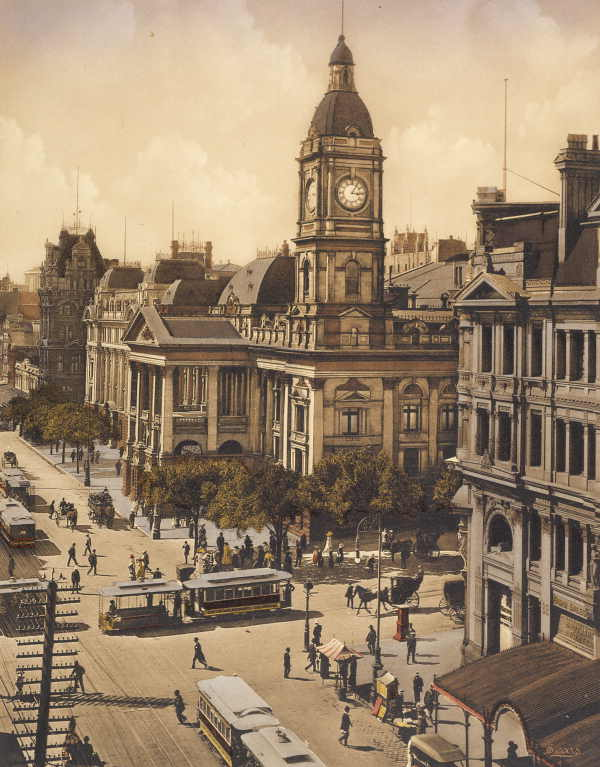
Melbourne Town Hall, 1910

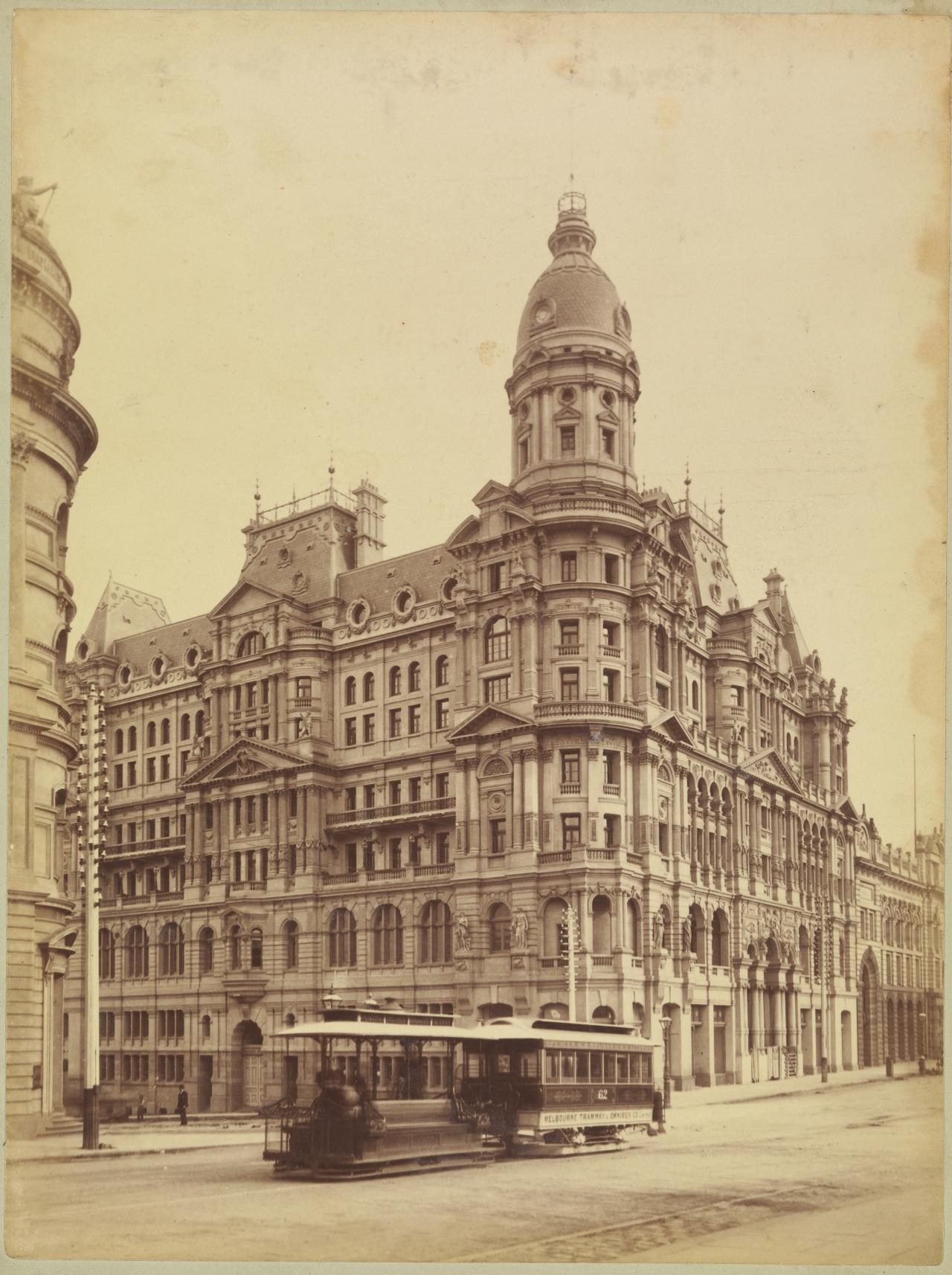
Cable Tram passing the Southwest corner of Collins and King streets in 1890–1900

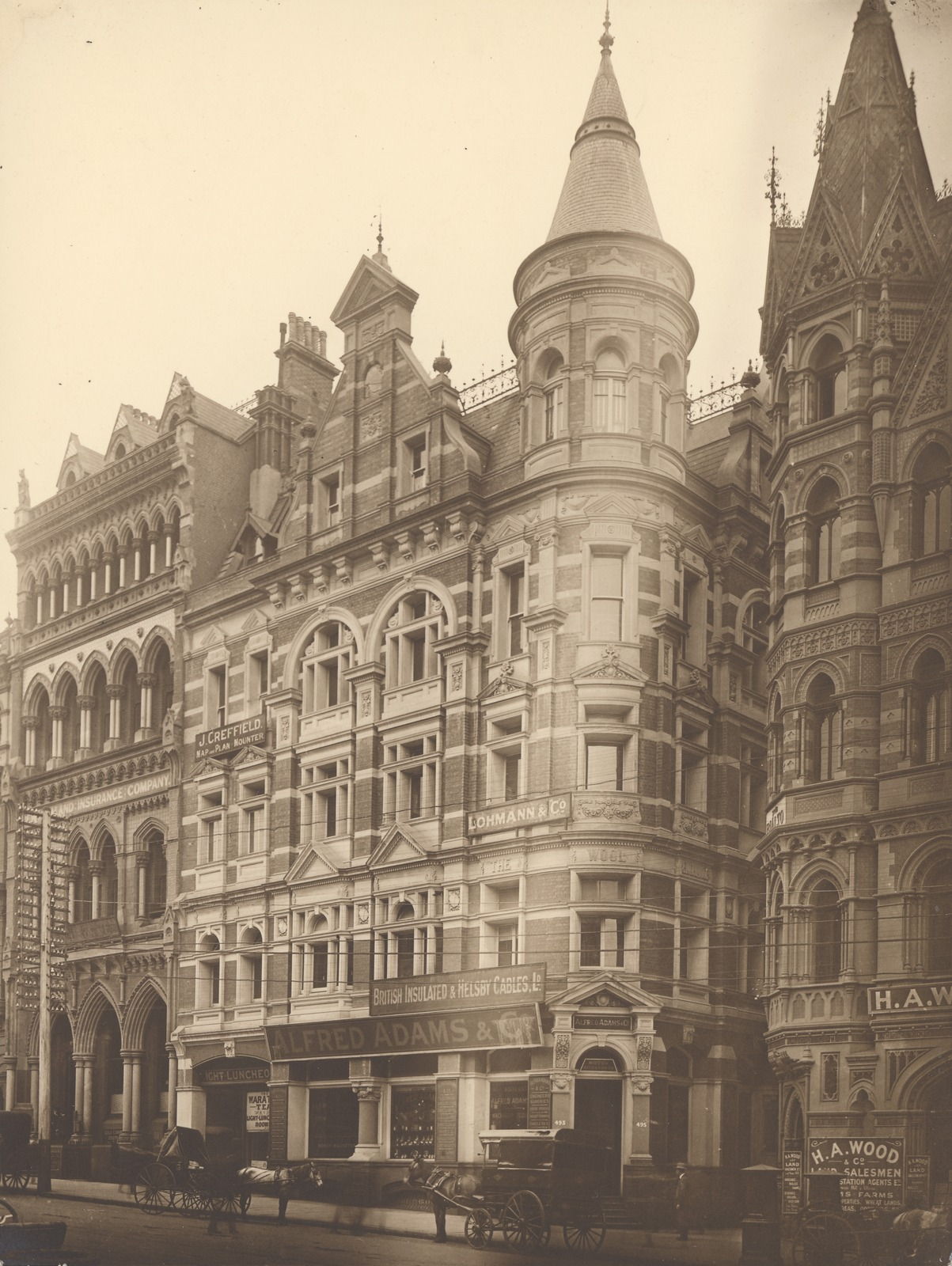
Wool Exchange (1891) in Melbourne's city centre.

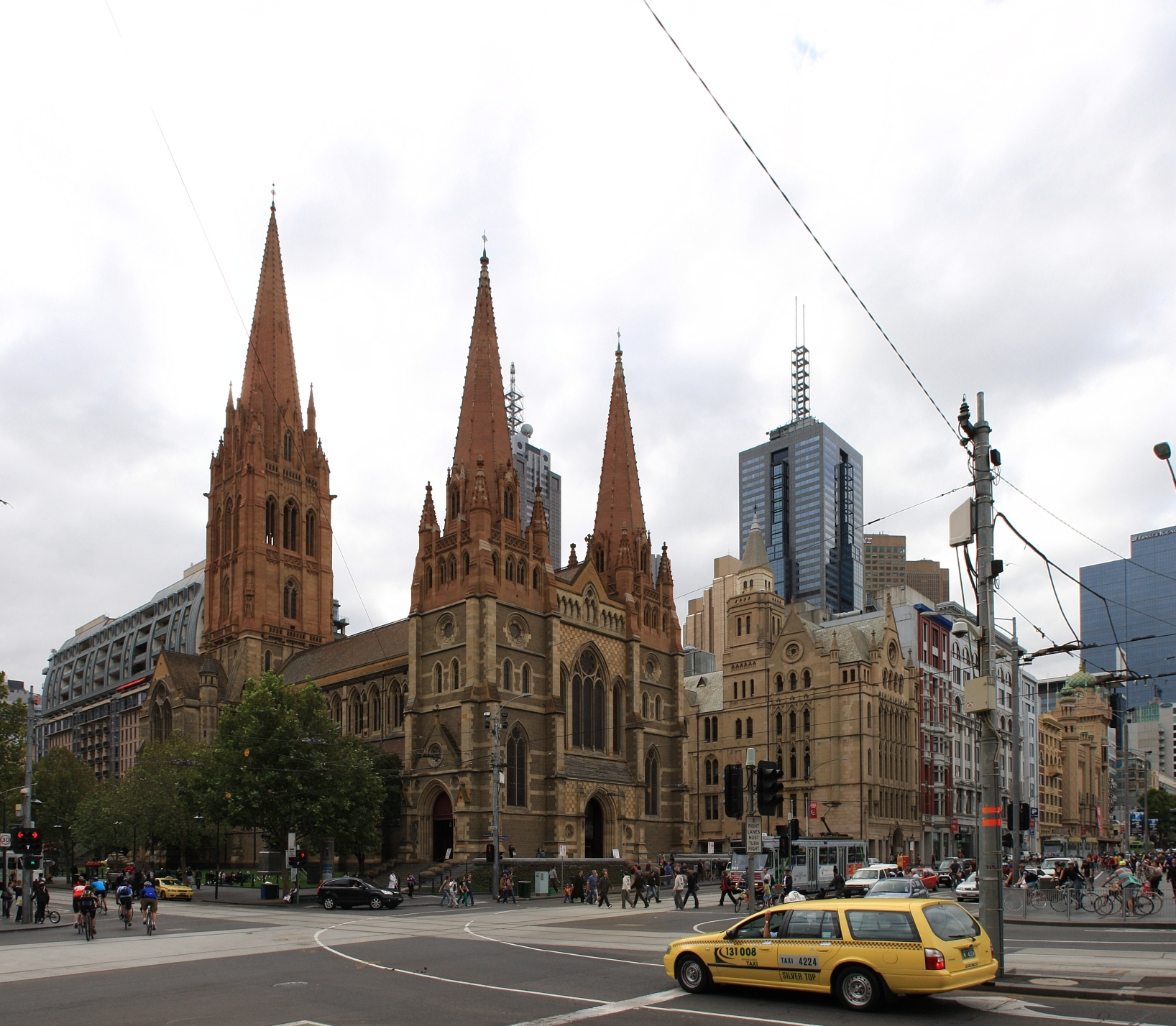
St Paul's Cathedral from Flinders Street in 2009

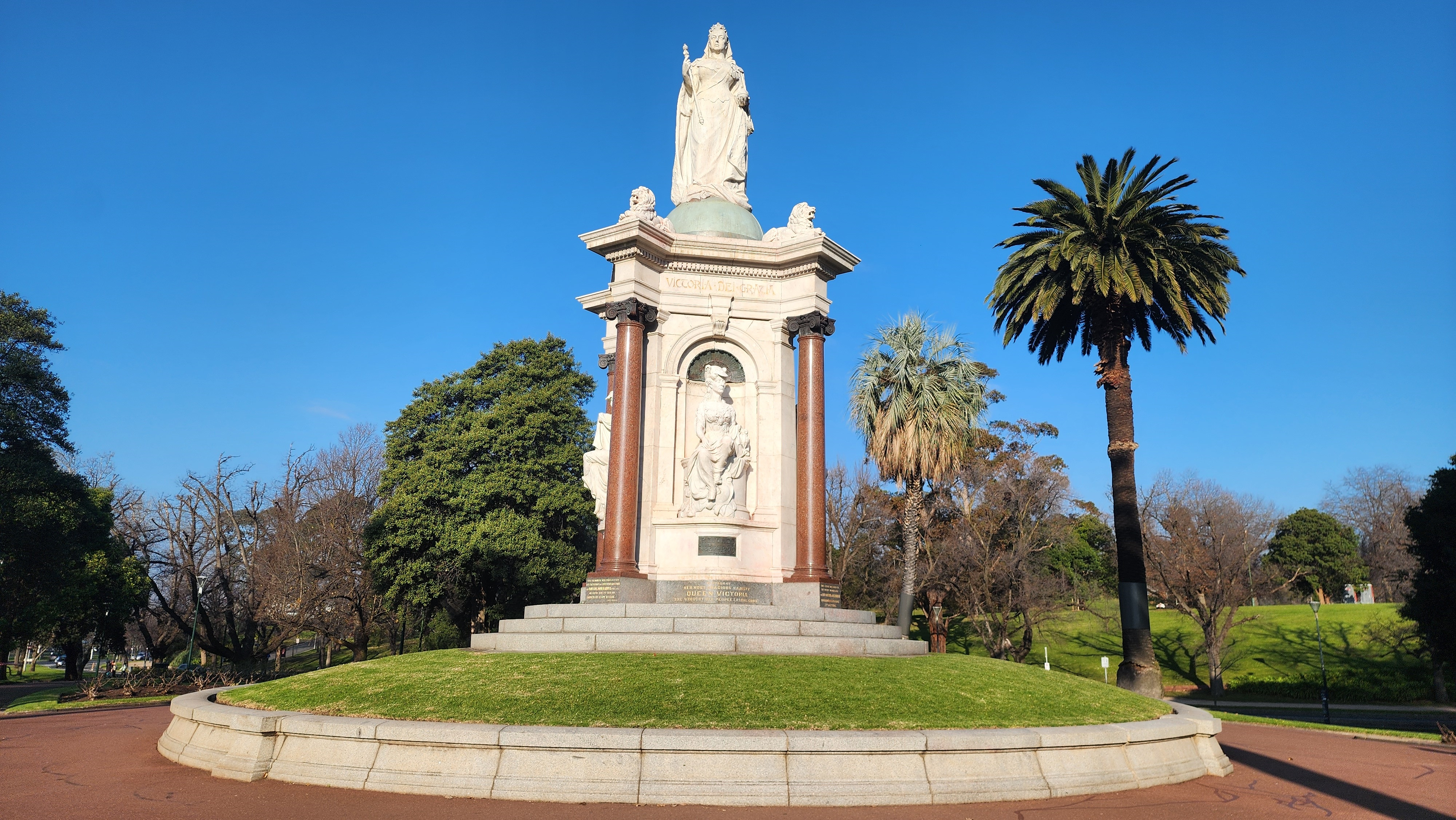
Queen Victoria Memorial, 2024

Marvellous Melbourne: Queen City of the South is a black and white silent documentary film about the city of Melbourne in 1910. The film is shot in an observation style, where each scene is divided by a title screen that introduces the next well-known metropolitan Melbourne street and/or building. Such iconography and landmarks that are included in the film are: Swanston Street, Melbourne Town Hall, St Kilda Road, St Paul's Cathedral, Bourke Street, the Central Post Office, Elizabeth Street, the Royal Exhibition Building, Collins Street, scenes on the Yarra River and of people playing Australian rules football. Developed under Spencer's Pictures, the label was renowned for "natural, artistic and realistic display" of the subjects and scenes they were filming.

The film's locations were shot by Spencer and Higgins over the previous year (1909) to the film's release. The film continues to be the oldest surviving film of the city of Melbourne. Produced under Spencer's Pictures, it was likely shot by Ernest Higgins, the main camera operator for the company at the time. This is contested as in the film's credits it attributed cinematography to "C. Spencer" not Higgins, although it is unlikely Spencer was the cinematographer for the whole film. The film debuted at the Spencer Wirth's Olympia theatre on 22 November 1910. The theatre that debuted the film was not affiliated with Spencer's Pictures.

== Title ==
The title, Marvellous Melbourne, although used by Spencer in the 1910 documentary, was not coined by the filmmaker but in a different context entirely some 30 years earlier. The term Marvellous Melbourne was a cultural product of 19th-century Melburnians' pride in living in the "booming" city of Melbourne. In 1885, George Augustus Sala wrote that he considered the city of Melbourne to "eclipse other colonial cities in terms of prestige" and thus felt it compelling to describe Melbourne as "marvellous".

In 1889, Sala's work would be put into a "melodrama burlesque", co-written by Alfred Dampier, J. H. Wrangham and Thomas Somers. The term, Marvellous Melbourne, shifted meaning in the late 19th century, turning satirical and contradicting the "booming" it once was. An economic depression would wear thin on the city and the term would be used as a sarcastic insult to the English class system that left many Melburnians unemployed and impoverished. Spencer's use of the slogan for the film, Marvellous Melbourne, saw a positive cultural shift in the terms of its connotation but would continue through various cultural and academic references in such light.

== Cinematography ==
The cinematography of the film Marvellous Melbourne, Queen City of the South, was considered intriguing and groundbreaking by audiences at the time as such angles were not recorded/broadcast before. These included, birds-eye-view-like angles of the city that were created through vantage points of the city, as such technology had not been created yet. "Point of view" angles were created in "fast" motion as the equipment was situated on the front of the tram going through various Melbourne streets. This scene is also referred to as a "phantom ride," as it seems as though the camera is floating through space and not held by any machinery or camera equipment but almost 'flying' through a space.

These both provided a new perspective in filmmaking and cinematography, without the development of expensive and innovative film equipment, which is all thanks to the city's tram network. An article published in The Age on 22 November 1910, showed the films advertising for an opening screening at Hoyt's Olympia theatre under the "Amusements" section. In terms of the physical preservation of the film, its nitrate base means it ages faster and is more fragile to the elements, it is being stored in a highly controlled environment at the National Film & Sound Archive exhibit. It has also since been digitised and is available on the National Film & Sound Archive site in 'clip' forms.

== Audience ==
At the time of filming Marvellous Melbourne (1909–1910), Melbourne was Australia's interim Capital and the most popular entry route from England to Australia. This put Melbourne on the global stage for Australia and Marvellous Melbourne was an aid in promoting the city to travelogue audiences. This would also mean that England tourists or patriated citizens would have a cultural and economic influence over the city. Therefore, Melbourne had developed as a city that would reflect and instil European architecture through its development. The landmarks and buildings that were filmed for Marvellous Melbourne were specifically selected for their European Design as Spencer and Higgins wanted to draw in "regal types" and "aspirational-regal types" as their target audience.

Through selecting this audience carefully through specific sites, scenes and buildings, it would ensure greater economic return for the filmmakers and city of Melbourne as these subclasses were affluent and willing to spend money on travel through influence. Higgins hoped that the audience would experience its iconography through the magic of cinema, describing such experiences as a "thrill." At the beginning of the 20th century there was a shift in the representation of women in cinema, Higgins and Spencer chose to depict the 'modern women' within Marvellous Melbourne, with the intention to appeal to female audiences. This is particularly apparent during the scenes of the football match where only female spectators were filmed, despite the conflicting reality of gendered football audiences.

== Audience perception ==
Audience members that saw the film initially had mixed reactions. In particular, one man's experience whilst watching the film in Perth resulted in a state of delusion. He had reportedly fallen asleep during the film, only to be woken by the Peanut Boy after several attempts; he had thought he had been transported to Melbourne's Flinders Street. This was due to the film's ground breaking cinematography that such audiences had not experienced before.

Ernst Higgins created point-of-view scenes that made the viewer feel as though they were a part of that time and place. More specifically, the scene of St Kilda street that puts the audience in the position moving through the street. Therefore, with the absence of the tram in the frame, it gives the illusion that the audience has agency over the direction of the filming of the shot. This adverse reaction to the moving picture was not uncommon for audiences. L'Arrivée d'un train en gare de La Ciotat received a similar reaction to the showing of a locomotive on screen with the illusion that the train was going to hit the audience members, noting it caused "terror, even panic." Furthermore, a Sydney Morning Herald article in 1910 depicted the film as an "education" was published in on Monday 14 February 1910.

== Representation ==
Marvellous Melbourne: Queen City of the South was developed to put the city on display and show the most prestigious and impressive sites of the city. At the time of the film's production and showing, there was no other film that depicted the city in such a way. Both through representation and film techniques, the audience was exposed to something never seen before. The film represents various middle/upper class Melburnians in various social settings.

Cosens Spencer ensured the representation within Marvellous Melbourne was of the middle/upper class as he wanted his viewing parties and audience to reflect the same. Groups and classes of Melbourne's society that were not represented include Melbourne's Asian population and the lower class. It, however, does show the "modern women in movement with the city," that can be aligned to that of changing gender dynamics of the early 20th century. This changing of gender dynamics is shown through women walking the streets of Melbourne unaccompanied by a male and socialising with other women. The intended audience for the film was at the promising market of city travelogues that would in turn improve perceptions and tourism for the city of Melbourne.

The film also shows scenes of a men's football game. Higgins also films young females in various locations, but specifically in the Collins Street scene. This intention was to provide insight to the pastime "doing the block" which is seen as ritualistic promenading for young socialites of the metropolitan scene. This representation of promenading and navigating city traffic as shot by Higgins, was significant and deliberate in broadcasting the authentic experience of Melbourne city life which is dodging the new industrial world.

Moreover, the depiction of women throughout the film represented Melbourne as a modern city. During the scene of a football match, women are the audience members at the forefront of the scene, with men in the background. Throughout the film there is no representation nor recognition of Melbourne's Indigenous population. There is no acknowledgement of the Wurundjeri people of the Kulin nation, who are the original inhabitants of the land that Marvellous Melbourne was shot across.

== Locations ==
Marvellous Melbourne: Queen City of the South, explores the following sites/buildings/scenes: (in order of appearance)

- Richmond station
- St Kilda Road
- Melbourne Town Hall
- St Paul's Cathedral
- Collins Street
- Treasury Building
- Bourke Street
- Parliament House
- Melbourne Central Post Office
- Elizabeth Street
- Royal Exhibition Building
- Swanston Street
- Government House
- Queen Victoria Memorial
- Melbourne Museum
- National Gallery of Victoria
- The Henley Regatta on the Yarra River
- Agricultural Show Grounds
- Victoria Barracks Australian rules football match
- Boating on the Yarra River (shot from Studley Park)
- Flinders Street station
- Princes Bridge
- Ships on the Yarra River
- Port Melbourne

== Cosens Spencer ==
Cosens Spencer began his career in the film industry by screening movies. He migrated from New York in 1903, residing in Sydney. In 1905 he began showing imported films at the Lyceum Theatre. In 1913, three years after Marvellous Melbourne's debut he opened a theatre at 100 St Kilda Road, later the site of the State Theatre which opened in 1984. Spencer aimed films towards the middle-and-working-class audiences through soundtrack and advertising. He was also known for his production of bushranger films like Captain Midnight, the Bush King and The Life and Adventures of John Vane, the Notorious Australian Bushranger. He left Australia in 1919 and in 1923 moved with his wife, "Senora Spencer", to a ranch where seven years later he drowned himself after fatally shooting his storeman and wounding another on 10 September 1930, leaving his estate to the "Orphanages of Sydney".

== Transport ==
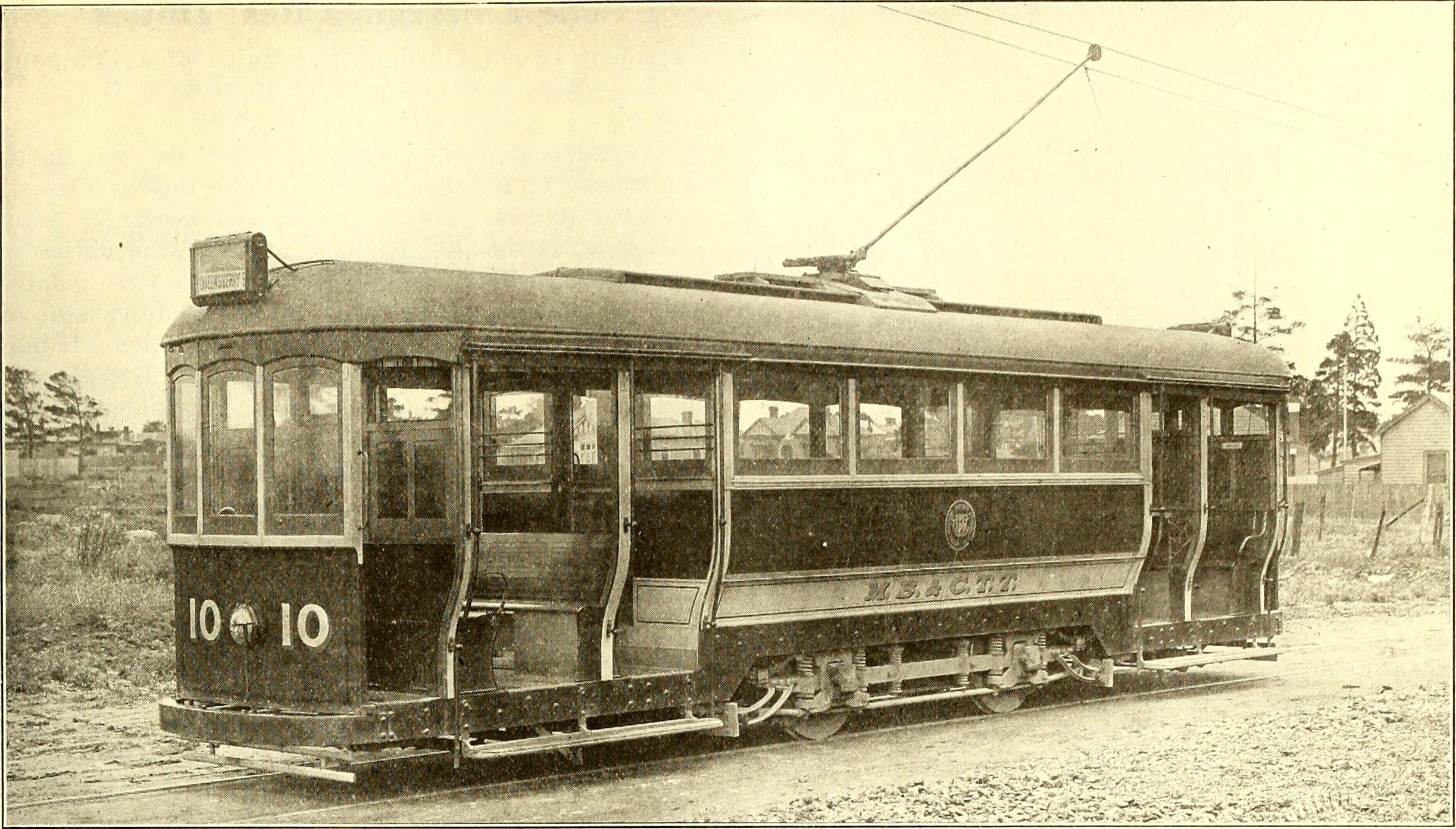
Electric tram in Melbourne in 1917

The film acts as a glimpse to the past and the infrastructure that helped it move into the metropolis it is today. Throughout the film, various forms of public and private transport are shown. Particularly the rail system that was developed 20 years before the film's premiere, enabled Ernst Higgins to create the point-of-view shots. With the establishment of electric trams by the North Melbourne Electric Tramway & Lighting Company, electric trams were operating by 1906 spreading across the city by 1910. At the time of filming, Melbourne Tramway & Omnibus Company owned the monopoly over the tram network of the city. Other forms of public transport shown in Marvellous Melbourne include the trains of Richmond station. As shown in the scenes of Richmond station, steam locomotive were the main choice of railway locomotives for the city's rail network.
