= Cosens Spencer =

British-Canadian-Australian film exhibitor and producer

- Born: Spencer Cosens; 12 February 1874; Hunston, Sussex, England
- Died: 10 September 1930 (age 56); Canada
- Occupations: Film exhibitor, film producer
- Known for: Spencer's Pictures

Spencer Cosens (12 February 1874 – 10 September 1930) best known as Cosens Spencer and posthumously as Charles Cozens Spencer, was a British-born Canadian film exhibitor and producer, a significant figure in the early years of the Australian film industry. His company Spencer's Pictures was an early backer of Raymond Longford before it was absorbed into the conglomerate which became known as "The Combine".

One article called him "virtually the first man to realise the importance of the locally-made article, even though his efforts were too early to do anything more than pave the way for those who were to come after."

== Biography ==
Spencer was born in Hunston, West Sussex, the third son of Cornelius Cosens, farmer, and his wife Ellen. In 1892, he emigrated with his brother Arthur to British Columbia, Canada, with the gold rush. He did a variety of jobs then in 1894 formed a pastoral services company with his brother Sidney at Fairview and Camp McKinney. In 1898 he was a clerk at Vernon, where he began screening motion pictures and met and married Mary Stuart Huntly, generally referred to as Senora Spencer, who became his chief projectionist and business partner. He then set his eye on the south Pacific, first showing films in New Zealand, having arrived in 1902 per steamer Moana via Brisbane and Sydney.

=== Australia ===
The Spencers returned to Sydney in 1905. (Note: By this time he was calling himself Cosens Spencer, but legally remained Spencer Cosens.) He opened his American Theatrescope or Spencer's Theatrescope at the Lyceum Theatre in Pitt Street, Sydney, showing newsreel shorts with a 3,000 candle-power carbon-arc projector, accompanied by a "full orchestra" and sound effects, Spencer himself giving a commentary as required. He showed scenes from Wilson Barrett's drama,The Sign of the Cross in July, From September to November 1905, while having the Lyceum upgraded, he took the Theatrescope to the newly opened Queen's Hall, Perth, Western Australia, which proved highly profitable, and was back at the Lyceum in December.

In February–March 1906 his Theatrescope showed the latest films at the Theatre Royal, Adelaide and the Town Hall, Port Adelaide, followed by Albany and Perth Town Halls in March (a few nights at each), then Broken Hill in March, then to Queensland August to October: first Cairns, then Rockhampton, Maryborough, Gympie, and finally Brisbane at Her Majesty's Theatre, Brisbane, before returning to the Sydney Lyceum in December. When making these tours they carried their own alternator (to avoid the vagaries of local supplies) and around 30,000 feet of film.

He made a diversion to Broken Hill in May 1907, before signing a long lease on the Lyceum, then embarked on a purchasing trip to France, Great Britain, and America while having the Lyceum renovated. On their return to Australia he recruited and trained a second projection unit, which operated at the Palace Theatre, Melbourne, from February to March 1908, the Tivoli Theatre, Adelaide from May to July 1909, and Wirth's Olympia from January 1910 to October 1913. Spencer's Theatrescope reopened at the Palace Theatre, Sydney in February 1908, but returned to the Lyceum in April. and continued to February 1913.

=== Some imported films ===
- A 1,200-ft film A Trip to the Sun, in August 1905.
- The Blind Man's Child
- Olympic Games in October 1906
- A comedy The Blacksmith's Daughter in 1906.
- The Wedding of Sandy McNab with Harry Lauder
- Not Guilty in December 1910

=== Production ===
Now a wealthy man, he moved into production, establishing a permanent production unit under Ernest Higgins in 1908, initially producing documentary shorts and newsreels. In 1908, he produced a documentary The Burns-Johnson Fight for H. D. McIntosh of the World Heavyweight Championship boxing match between Tommy Burns and Jack Johnson that was groundbreaking for its time, focusing on the preparation for the fight as well as the highlights of the actual fight itself and then reflections from those involved afterwards. Spencer made significant profits from the production and distribution of the documentary in Australia and across the world. He then moved into funding dramatic feature films, starting with The Life and Adventures of John Vane, the Notorious Australian Bushranger, released in March 1910.

Spencer was an early supporter of director Raymond Longford who directed The Fatal Wedding (1911) for him. The movie cost £360 to produce, but netted over £18,000. Its success enabled him to set up a £10,000 studio complex in Rushcutter's Bay, Sydney, where Longford made his next couple of features. He also purchased Nugal Hall. Spencer is credited with establishing productions in Australia with sound and colour, turning Sydney into one of the world's leading movie centres at the time. Fox Studios Australia bears a commemoration plaque memorializing Spencer's role as a pioneer in the movie world.

By 1912, he was the largest importer of films in Australia but was also responsible for a handful of local productions. Several of his films were released in the US by Sawyers Pictures with new titles, such as The Convict Hero, The Bushranger's Bride, Nell Gwynne, The Bandit Terrors of Australia, and The Queen of the Smugglers.

=== Restructure ===
In September 1911 Spencer floated Spencer's Pictures Ltd, with a nominal capital of £150,000, to take over the assets and goodwill of his moving picture business. Spencer, who was appointed managing director, undertook not to engage in competition for the next ten years. Critically, Senora Spencer did not sign the agreement.

In 1912 the board of Spencer's Pictures Ltd voted to merge with Wests Ltd and Amalgamated Pictures resulting in the "combine" of Australasian Films and Union Theatres. In September 1912, Spencer's Pictures merged with Amalgamated Pictures and West's Ltd to create the General Film Company of Australasia Ltd, with capital of £250,000 in £1 shares. The following year this company combined with the Greater J. D. Williams Amusement Co, a large exhibition and film supply outfit, to create two new entities, General Film Company and the Greater Williams Company, each with an exhibiting branch and a film hiring branch. The Spencers, who were on a 12-month overseas visit, were not part of the negotiations.

In 1914 Spencer's Pictures released The Shepherd of the Southern Cross, much of which was filmed around Bathurst. It was well received but apparently insufficiently profitable for the consortium, which actively discouraged further Australian productions. As a consequence, Spencer reportedly retired from the boards of all four companies — Australasian Films Ltd, Union Theatres Ltd, General Films Company of Australasia, Ltd, and Spencer's Pictures, Ltd, however in March 1917 Spencer resigned as a director of Spencer's Pictures Ltd after the board refused to grant him the power of veto over matters of policy.

In September 1917 the Spencers, who were still shareholders, were sued by Australasian Films Ltd and Union Theatres Ltd for breaking conditions under which their company was taken into the conglomerate. Specifically, they alluded to non-competitive clauses in the formation of Spencer's Pictures Ltd, and the fact that Senora Spencer, who had a joint bank account with Spencer and therefore a financial partner, had been hiring films and operating projection equipment at the Lyceum Theatre, Sydney and had purchased land for a cinema in Brisbane.

They settled out of court (by allowing their interests to be purchased) and left Australia.

== Death ==
Spencer returned with his wife to Canada, where he prospered, purchasing several ranches in Chilcotin County, British Columbia. The stresses of his financial losses in the Great Depression, however, affected his mental stability (in particular, he was troubled by an image of the devil's face visible in the grain of a wooden wall).

On 10 September 1930, he was unpacking a truck full of groceries at one of his ranches along with his foreman, Walter Stoddart, and a grocer, Edward Smith. Spencer, who had been refused a pistol licence on account of his mental instability, grabbed a rifle and began shooting, hitting Smith in the back and Stoddart in the arm, before fleeing. Smith died of his wounds; Stoddart managed to drive away and survived. Spencer went missing in the aftermath of the shooting, leading to speculation that he had returned to Australia. Eventually, on 29 October 1930, his body was found in a lake, where he had drowned himself. He left an estate worth £60,000 (over A$5 million in 2023) to his wife. A recent biography asserts that he left debts of £8840 in Australia and that the residue of his estate was left to the 'Orphanages of Sydney'.

== Filmography ==
- The Burns-Johnson Fight (1908)
- Marvellous Melbourne (1910) – director
- The Life and Adventures of John Vane, the Notorious Australian Bushranger (1910) – producer
- Captain Midnight, the Bush King (1911) – producer
- Captain Starlight, or Gentleman of the Road (1911) – producer
- The Life of Rufus Dawes (1911) – producer
- Dan Morgan (1911) – producer
- The Fatal Wedding (1911) – producer
- The Romantic Story of Margaret Catchpole (1911) – producer
- Sweet Nell of Old Drury (1911) – producer
- The Midnight Wedding (1912) – producer
- The Bushman's Bride (1912) – producer
- The Tide of Death (1912) – producer
- Australia Calls (1913) – producer
- The Shepherd of the Southern Cross (1914) – producer
