= Sweet Nell of Old Drury =

- Written by: Raymond Longford; George Musgrove
- Based on: play by Paul Kester
- Produced by: George Musgrove; Cosens Spencer
- Starring: Nellie Stewart
- Cinematography: Ernest Higgins
- Production company: Spencer's Pictures
- Distributed by: Sawyers Pictures (USA)
- Release date: 2 December 1911 1913 (USA)
- Running time: 4,800 ft
- Country: Australia
- Languages: Silent film English intertitles
- Budget: £2,000

Sweet Nell of Old Drury (US: Nell Gwynne) is a 1911 Australian silent film directed by Raymond Longford starring Nellie Stewart about the relationship between Nell Gwynne and King Charles II. It is based on the 1900 play of the same name by Paul Kester which Stewart had performed numerous times on stage. It is considered a lost film.

Making reference to the film, a 1931 obituary for Stewart described her as Australia's "first screen star" and "the first world celebrity to appear in an Australian film production."

The film was a financial success.

Stewart made only brief reference to the film in her 1923 memoirs, and incorrectly suggested a copy of the film survived - to be released after her death.

== Plot ==
The plot consisted of five acts and 79 scenes. In Restoration England, Judge Jeffries tries to persuade his ward, Lady Olivia Vernon to marry Lord Rochester, but she refuses because she is in love with Sir Robert Fairfax. Rochester calls guards to arrest Fairfax and he runs away, meeting with Nell Gwynne, the orange seller, who helps him escape.

Nell meets King Charles in front of Old Drury and, not knowing who he is, treats him familiarly. She soon captivates the King with her power of mimicry, particularly her take off of Judge Jeffries. She helps Roger and Olivia escape from the clutches of Jeffries' men.

Jeffries is demanding to know the whereabouts of the young couple from Nell when the Kind if announced and Nell recognises who it is. Nell is installed in a palatial mansion.

Lacet, Judge Jeffries' servant, informs his master that Roger is hiding in Nell's new house. Guards are ordered into her house to search for the wanted man. Nell directs the guard's attention to the room into which the King has retired. Olivie is then seen by the guard enterting Nell's room. Jeffries guards enter again and arrest Roger. There is a fight between Nell and Lord Jeffries and Nell wins.

Jeffries determines to destroy Nell and frogs a letter to compromise Nell and Fairfax. Fairfax is arrested for treason, but Nell impersonates Jeffries and releases Fairfax so he can be with Olivia. She also finds evidence to get Jeffries to be dismissed and is reunited with the King.

== Cast ==
- Nellie Stewart as Nell Gwynne
- Augustus Neville as King Charles II
- Charles Lawrence as Lord Jeffries
- Stewart Clyde as Lord Rochester
- W. Ladd as Lord Lovelace
- Leslie Woods as Sir Robert Fairfax
- W. Edgeworth as Lacey, Lord Jeffries' servant
- Walter Bastin as Percival, a strolling player
- Fred Pettit as Rollins, a strolling player
- Henry Westall as Lord Winchester
- A Kendall as Mercer
- Walter Vincent as William
- Eric Montaigne as Nebuchadnezzar
- P Francis as Captain Clavering
- W Flindt as Captain of the Guard
- Miss Neville Vane as Tiffin
- Elsie Rennie as page
- P Laing as Lady Clivebrook
- Dorothy Clarke as Duchess of Portsmouth
- Agnes Keough as Lady Castlemaine
- Roslyn Vane as Lady Olivia Vernon

== Original play ==
Sweet Nell of Old Drury
- Poster from 1909 production of play with Nellie Stewart
- Original language: English
- Written by: Paul Kester
- Genre: historical farce

Premiere
- Date: 1900

The play was performed on stage in 1900 in London and New York. Julia Neilson became well known for playing it in the United Kingdom.

Nellie Stewart first appeared in it in 1902. She took the role to reinvent herself as a dramatic star after her career as a singer and it was a great success. Stewart played the role of Nell Gwynne on and off until her death in 1931, even touring America with it. Stewart was so identified with the part she was known as "Little Nell".

== Production ==
=== Development ===
Spencer arranged for Nellie Stewart to appear in the film version by virtue of an arrangement with George Musgrove. The news was much publicised, the West Australian stating:

This will be the most notable work yet accomplished in Australia for the picture shows, as Miss Nellie Stewart is so essentially Australia's leading and representative actress, and is known as such all the world over, while she is so identified with "Sweet Nell" that it is only right a pictorial record should be kept of her in the part.

Stewart's fee was a reported £1,000 – half the budget – plus a percentage of the profits. (Or US$5,000) This helped make the movie among the most expensive shot in Australia to that date.

Nellie Stewart's daughter Nancy was originally announced to play the part of Olivia.

=== Shooting ===
Shooting began in October 1911 in Sydney, in and around Elizabeth Bay and Potts Point, and at Spencer's Wonderland City studio in Bondi.

Filming took six weeks. The original director was George Musgrove, but he soon realised he was out of his depth, and Longford – who had written the screenplay – took over. (However advertising would claim that "the whole of the production has been carried out under the personal supervision of Mr George Musgrove".)

According to a later report, when Longford wanted to "film a landing, he begged permission to land at Crecy, at Potts Point, Sydney. The mistress of the house was away for the moment, but the maid said she was sure it would be all right. The lady of the house was later much astonished when a gorgeous pageant of lords and ladies, King Charles, Lord Jeffreys and Sweet Nell herself took possession of her lawn, appearing to come from nowhere. She did not know whether she was dreaming or not until reassured that it was only make believe."

Prior to release the Sunday Times reported that "we are informed that Miss Stewart and Mr. George Musgrove had no words save those of praise when Mr. Spencer's artists 'completed their work."

== Release ==
=== Critical ===
The movie premiered at Spencer's Lyceum Theatre in Sydney. The critic for the Sydney Morning Herald reported that:

The audience found it hard to express sufficient appreciation of the film... All the scenes of the life of the flower girl that ruled a king... were wonderfully reproduced in the picture, the whole being a great triumph of the Australian artificers that produced it. The music throughout the afternoon and evening performance was excellent, and the variety of scenic, comic and dramatic pictures... tastefully chosen and admirable.

The critic from the Sunday Times wrote that:

The long film is wonderfully sharp and clear. Miss Stewart looks at her best in the third act – the act in which Nell Gwynne waves her monster of a hat as she leaves for Whitehall after the masquerade episode which secures the escape of Lady Olivia Vernon from the clutches of the cruel Chief Justice... So as to introduce outdoor effects a number of scenes have been added [from the play], illustrating episodes of the story that were not included in the stage version. The Australian garden scenes are remarkably good, but the glimpses of the military barracks at Paddington spoil the illusion of far off days in England when Charles the Second was King.

The critic from the Examiner said that:

The result is undoubtedly an artistic triumph... The events are, for the most part, recognised in history, illuminated with touches of romantic license such as are necessary to make the play something more than episodal, and justification for the author's methods is shown by the fact that Miss Nellie Stewart in her presentation of the stage version in this and other continents, has scored in it one of the most remarkable of her successes of her long career. The picture personation of the story is very realistic and dramatic, and has certainly lost none of its charm and interest from the fact that the characters merely move through the historic scenes, and do not talk, for the camera 'has caught the spirit intention' of the actors with a fidelity akin to nature.

The Bulletin called it:

a creditable production which keeps close enough to the stage version, and runs in some outdoor extras, wherein the real scenery gives the play a startling touch of reality. The approach of Nellie Stewart down a narrow bush track wrings cheers from the audience; and when she offers the house an orange, the welkin suffers the usual damage. The pursuit of Fairfax, his march to the prison, Jeffreys' stealthy advance on Nell Gwynn's house, Olivia’s trip to Whitehall in Jeffreys' chair, and other incidents, are shown amidst real Sydney surroundings. At the end, Charles yearningly pursues the retreating Nell through a fine garden, where he is met and comforted by a page, who brings him two spaniels.

The film was bought for release in the US by Sawyers Inc, who retitled it Nell Gwynne.

=== Box office ===
The film was a major success at the box office, helped by Nellie Stewart making personal appearances at some screenings. Twelve thousand people supposedly saw the film during its first seven sessions. Screenings were often accompanied by a singer who would sing on stage when Nellie Stewart sang.

== Status ==
The movie screened in cinemas for six years, but no copies of it appear to exist today, and it is considered a lost film.

As early as 1931 Everyone's wrote that there was no copy, asking "Where is "Sweet Nell" now? Screen history, not merely of Australia, but of the whole world is woven into its celluloid. If the negative still exists it should merit high regard among the treasures of an industry which has just began [sic] to discover its past."
