= Forum Theatre =

Theatre, cinema and music venue in Melbourne, Victoria, Australia

Forum Melbourne
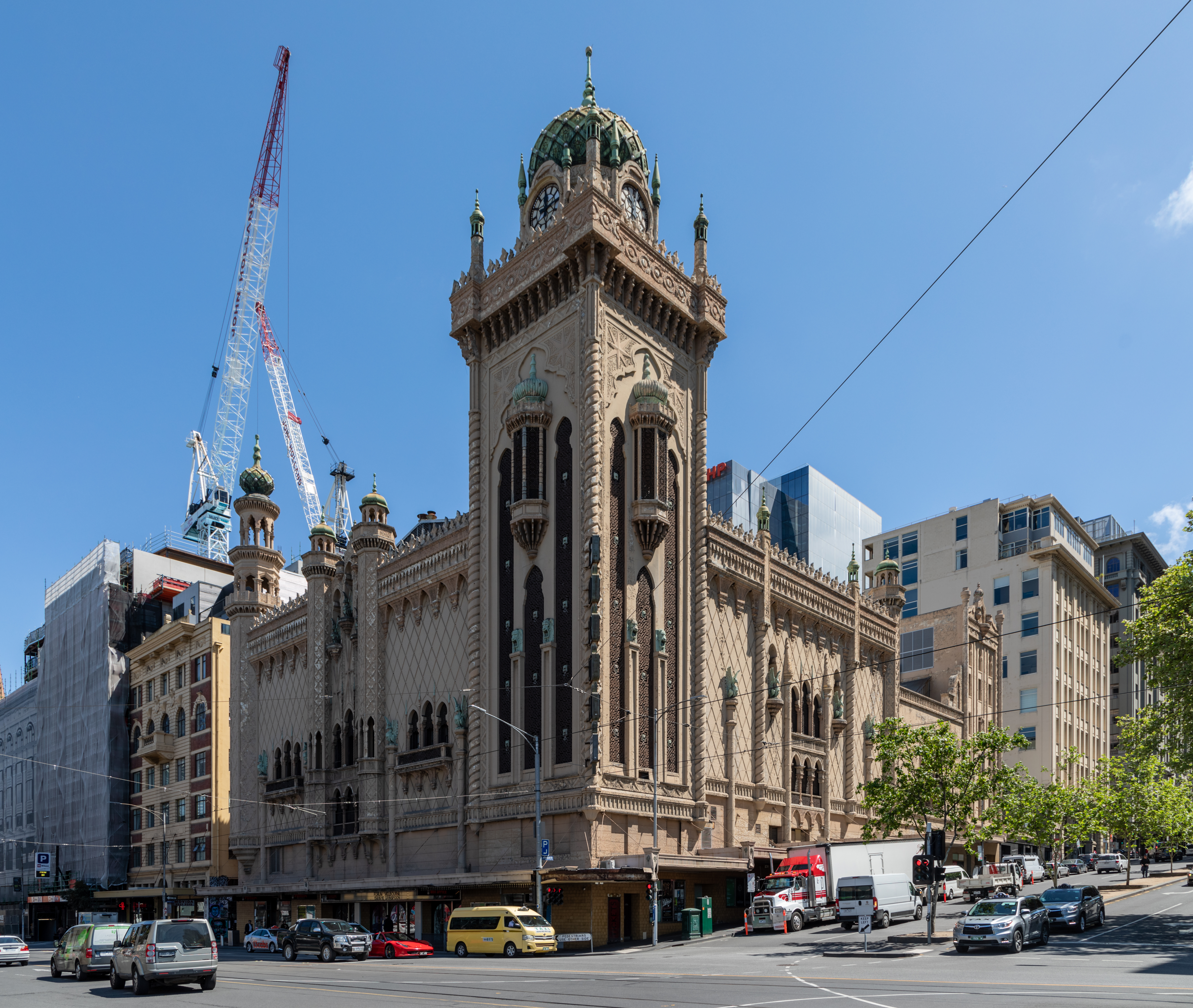
- Interactive map of Forum Melbourne
- Former names: State Theatre (1920-1962)
- Address: 154 Flinders Street; Melbourne; Australia
- Coordinates: 37.8165732°S 144.9693686°E
- Owner: Marriner Group
- Capacity: 2,000 standing (Forum 1), 520 seated (Forum 2)
- Designation: Victorian Heritage Register, Historic Buildings Register
- Current use: live music, comedy, film

Construction
- Opened: 23 February 1929
- Years active: 1929–1985, 1995–present
- Architect: John Eberson

Website
- forummelbourne.com.au

The Forum Theatre (originally the State Theatre) is a historic theatre and former cinema now used as a live music and event venue located on the corner of Flinders Street and Russell Street in Melbourne, Australia.

Built in 1929, it was designed by leading US 'picture palace' architect John Eberson, in association with the local architectural firm Bohringer, Taylor & Johnson. Designed as an 'atmospheric theatre', the interior intended to evoke a Florentine walled garden, complete with a cerulean-blue ceiling sprinkled with lights like twinkling stars, mimicking a twilight sky.

It was renamed the Forum Theatre in 1962, converted into two separate cinemas in 1963, then after the cinemas' closure used for religious services for several years; however, since 1995, it has operated as live music and events venue Forum Melbourne, more commonly known simply as The Forum.

== History ==
The sites of the Morning Post building (on Flinders Street) and State Migration Office (on Russell Street) were purchased in 1927 by Rufe Naylor, with the goal of building a sister theatre to his Empire in Sydney. In 1928 the site was purchased by Stuart F. Doyle, managing director of Union Theatres, for development as the State Theatre.

The Union's State Theatre was in competition with the Hoyts' Regent Theatre, nearby in Collins Street, to be the first truly extravagant 'picture palace' in Melbourne. The State won the race after seven months’ construction time, opening on 23 February 1929, three weeks ahead of the Regent. When it opened, it also had the largest seating capacity in Australia, holding 3,371 people.

Opening night was nothing less than spectacular, and presented the silent films The Fleet’s In starring Miss Clara Bow, and The Cameraman starring Buster Keaton. The first ‘talkie’ was The Doctor's Secret, premiering on 6 April 1929.

The design features an exotic Moorish style exterior, including minarets and a clock tower, and an auditorium designed as if it were a 'Florentine courtyard', with a curved ceiling painted dark blue. It was designed principally by US cinema specialist John Eberson, in association with local theatre designers Bohringer Taylor & Johnson. Eberson pioneered the design of such 'atmospheric' style theatres, usually with 'courtyard' walls in elaborate eclectic Spanish Baroque / Renaisance styles, often featuring statuary, and moving clouds projected on the ceiling. Eberson also designed the Capitol Theatre in Sydney built the year before, with an interior that is almost exactly the same as Melbourne, but mirrored; they are amongst only a few atmospheric theatres built outside North America. The very elaborate Moorish / Arabic style exterior is quite rare amongst all 1920s picture palaces, with only the Fox Atlanta, the Avalon Chicago and the Omaha Riviera being comparable.

A dual-console Wurlitzer organ of style 270 was installed, the first to be built 'west of Chicago', featuring 21 rows of pipes and a grand piano attachment and oboe horn. The organ was opened in 1928 by Frank D. Lanterman, for two years the resident organist, with Renee Lees on the minor console. It was removed from the theatre in 1963, and subsequently installed in the Moorabbin Town Hall (now Kingston City Hall) by members of the Victorian Division of the Theatre Organ Society of Australia.

In 1962, the building was renamed the Forum Theatre.

In 1963, recognising the changing trends in attendance, cinema chain Greater Union converted now-oversized auditorium into two smaller separate cinemas. The Dress Circle balcony was blocked in, creating the upstairs Rapallo Theatre (with a new entry from Russell Street) while the Stalls level retained the Forum Theatre name and Flinders Street entry. In 1981 further renovations took place, including the renaming of the cinemas to Forum I and Forum II.

In 1985 it was purchased and used by Revival Centres International, a Christian organisation, and fell into disrepair. In 1995 it was purchased by David Marriner's Staged Developments Australia, who redeveloped it for use as a film and concert venue operating as Forum Melbourne. It became part of Marriner Group's portfolio of theatres, including Melbourne's Princess Theatre and Regent Theatre, and joined by the Comedy Theatre in 1996.

The theatre was listed on the Victorian Heritage Register in 1978 and classified by the National Trust of Australia in 1994.

In 2013, the Marriner Group proposed an apartment tower to be built on the adjacent site to the north which they had bought, which was 32 levels (107m) in an area where an advisory height limit of 40m applies, and which would cantilever over the stage tower of the theatre, with restoration of the facade of the Forum as part of the project. This was approved by then Planning Minister Matthew Guy, but opposed by the City of Melbourne and local objectors, who took the matter to VCAT and won. An appeal by Marriner to the Supreme Court was not successful.

In early 2024, the Marriner Group applied for a permit from Heritage Victoria for urgent works because some decorative elements of the exterior were unstable and likely to fall.

== Current use ==
Forum I, or Forum Downstairs, is located on the ground floor and is generally used for concerts and other large-scale performances. The second-floor Forum II is a smaller 550-seat theatre-style amphitheatre.

Today, it is used for concerts by many artists, having hosted performances by One Ok Rock, Oasis, Madonna, Katy Perry, Cat Power, Jarvis Cocker, Dirty Three, Sufjan Stevens, Dizzee Rascal, Tame Impala, Lily Allen, The Yeah Yeah Yeahs, Harry Styles, Noname, Mac DeMarco, Regurgitator, Methyl Ethel, Meg Mac, Bachelor Girl, Spiderbait, Alison Wonderland, Mr. Big, Extreme and Living Colour among others.

In more recent times, the Forum has been used as a venue for numerous acts during the Melbourne International Comedy Festival, including local favourite Akmal Saleh and international acts, such as Mark Watson, Jason Byrne, Arj Barker and Megan Mullally among others and in September, Tyler Oakley's Slumber Party.

From 2009 to 2012 the Forum was the primary contemporary music venue for Melbourne Festival in expansive programs featuring scores of international and national music artists. It is also a venue for the annual Melbourne International Film Festival.

In 2016, the Forum underwent a major internal renovation to restore many of its original features and fixtures, including uncovering and restoring the mosaic tile entrance, remoulding and repairing statues, and moving the interior walls back to their original 1929 position. The Forum officially reopened 5 September 2017.

== Awards and nominations ==
=== Music Victoria Awards ===
The Music Victoria Awards are an annual awards night celebrating Victorian music. They commenced in 2006. The award for Best Venue was introduced in 2016.

Year	Nominee / work	Award	Result	Ref.
2016	Forum Theatre	Best Venue (Over 500 Capacity)	Nominated	
2017	Forum Theatre	Best Venue (Over 500 Capacity)	Nominated	
2019	Forum Theatre	Best Venue (Over 500 Capacity)	Won	
2020	Forum Theatre	Best Venue (Over 500 Capacity)	Won	
2021	Forum Theatre	Best Venue (Over 500 Capacity)	Nominated	
2022	Forum Theatre	Best Large Venue (Metro)	Won	
