= A Long, Long Way to Tipperary =

- Directed by: George Dean
- Based on: song It's a Long Way to Tipperary by Jack Judge
- Produced by: Ernest Higgins
- Starring: Adele Inman
- Production company: Higgins Brothers
- Distributed by: Australasian Films
- Release date: 16 November 1914
- Country: Australia
- Languages: Silent film English intertitles

It's a Long, Long Way to Tipperary is a 1914 Australian silent film based on the song It's a Long Way to Tipperary by Jack Judge.

== Plot ==
Irish woman Molly Malone is in love with Paddy O'Reilly, who emigrates to England to better himself. He enlists in the British Army during World War I and is sent to the front. Another Irishman, Mick, desires Molly and swears vengeance on Paddy. Molly dreams that Paddy and Mick fight but then sees that she is reunited with Paddy.

== Production ==
The film was one of several produced by the Higgins brothers in Sydney in the early years of the war. They struggled to recover their costs from the distributor, Australasian Films.

They were also involved in a dispute with the Fraser Film Release and Photographic Company over their attempts to distribute a British film from Maurice Elvey with the same title.

Raymond Longford said he worked on the film but claimed the direction was done by the Higgins brothers.
