= When the Kellys Rode =

1934 film by Harry Southwell

- Directed by: Harry Southwell
- Written by: Harry Southwell
- Starring: Hay Simpson
- Cinematography: Tasman Higgins
- Production company: Imperial Feature Films
- Distributed by: British Empire Films
- Release dates: August 1934 (NZ); October 1934 (Australia); June 1948 (re-release)
- Country: Australia
- Budget: £10,000 or £8,000
- Box office: £750

When the Kellys Rode is a 1934 Australian film directed by Harry Southwell about Ned Kelly.

== Plot ==
The story of Ned Kelly and his gang. A policeman comes to arrest Dan Kelly, which results in him being shot and Ned Kelly going on the run with his gang. They rob several banks but are captured and killed at the Glenrowan Hotel.

== Cast ==
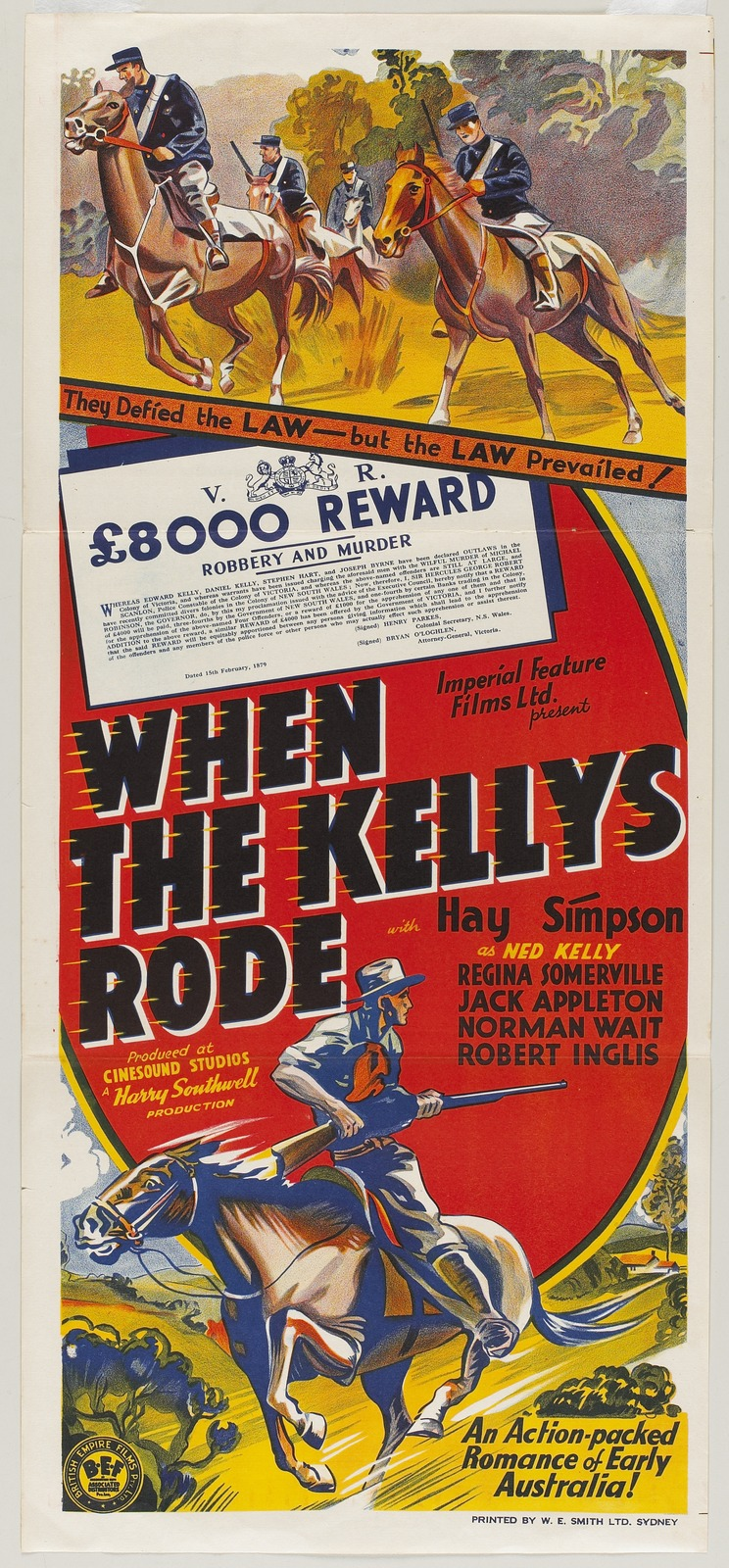
Poster for the Australian film When the Kellys Rode undated c 1934 Collection State Library Victoria

- Hay Simpson (Leslie Hay-Simpson) as Ned Kelly
- John Appleton as Dan Kelly
- Norman Wait as Joe Byrne
- Robert Inglis as Steve Hart
- Regena Somerville as Kate Kelly

== Production ==
The film was produced by Imperial Films which was incorporated in 1933 with a capital of £20,000.

Southwell had planned to call the film The Kelly Gang, but the Commonwealth censor objected to the use of the word gang in the title.

It was filmed on location in the Megalong Valley in the Blue Mountains and in Cinesound's Studio at Rushcutter's Bay. Southwell hired a crew from Cinesound Productions.

The film is considered to be first adaptation of the Kelly story with sound.

== Release ==
The film was forbidden from being exhibited in New South Wales for more than ten years under the ban on bushranging films. The government thought that the film glorified bushrangers, and showed the police in a bad light. The filmmakers protested but were unsuccessful. However the movie was passed, with cuts, for screening in Victoria and other states.

Critical response was unenthusiastic. The film performed poorly at the box office and only returned £750 of which £500 went to the producers.

The ban was lifted in 1942 and the film was re-released in 1948.

Leslie Hay-Simpson, a Sydney solicitor, who played Ned Kelly, was later lost at sea between Lord Howe Island and Sydney. He had been on Lord Howe Island during October 1936, acting in Mystery Island, a Paramount Pictures film directed by J. A. Lipman.
