= Lyceum Theatre, Sydney =

Theatre in Sydney, Australia

The Lyceum was a live theatre in Sydney, Australia, which became the Sydney City Mission for the Methodist Church while also hosting a cinema, several times relabeled the New Lyceum.

== History ==
On 26 December 1892 the Thomson Brothers opened the Lyceum Theatre Hotel, with which was incorporated the Lyceum Theatre, at 212–218 Pitt Street. (Note: The Lyceum was adjacent Palings at 208–210 Pitt Street and Tattersall's at 198–204. Often mentioned as "nearby" at 232 was the Rialto, previously Grand, then Liberty in 1934.) between Park and Market streets. It marked the reunion of the J. C. Williamson and George Musgrove interests, when they presented the pantomime Little Red Riding Hood.

=== Methodist church ===
In 1905 the seven-storey hotel and theatre were purchased for £30,000 by Ebenezer Vickery, a devout Methodist, who immediately surrendered its licence and cleared the bars, demonstrating his sense of justice by fully compensating the licensee, and donated the property to the church for their City Mission.

Pitt Street was a difficult spot for the missionaries, beset with betting shops and two-up schools, hotels and theatres, brothels and dance halls, yet Rev. David O'Donnell (died 1914) succeeded in drawing crowds with his oratory skill.

One of the most popular preachers was S. J. Hoban (1864–1931), who attracted crowds of 2,000–3,000 when he preached at the Lyceum.

In 1906 a three-manual pipe organ by George Fincham and Son was installed. Architect Reid was engaged to remodel the 139 Castlereagh Street frontage, to create a 2,500-seat auditorium and dozens of offices. Vickery died that year.

The building was officially handed over on Friday 17 April 1908, under conditions of peppercorn rent to 1915, when the freehold would be transferred by Vickery's trustees, three sons and a grandson. 1915 was named as the centenary of the arrival of Rev. Samuel Leigh and establishment of Australia's first Methodist circuit. The building, or at least the Castlereagh Street end, was renamed "Vickery Mission Settlement" in 1908.

The Central Methodist Mission moved its headquarters from the Centenary Hall (Note: The Centenary Hall (opened 1888) was built at a cost of £30,000, on the York Street site of the Wesleyan Church, which was demolished after receiving quotes of £4,000 for its restoration.) to the Lyceum Hall around 1912.

In 1922 the Methodist church purchased a property adjoining the Castlereagh Street frontage, at No. 135. Around the same time, the Rialto Theatre, opened nearby at 232 Pitt Street, boasting a "grand organ" (Wurlitzer Op. 324; moved to the Lyric / Wintergarden in 1924.) played by Renee Lees.

As moving pictures became a common form of entertainment, subjects were explored in drama and comedies which were anathema to Methodist teachings — drinking, dancing, committing adultery and having fun on Sunday — with no redeeming disgrace and punishment. Calls were made to sell the theatre and thus distance themselves from corrupting influences. Jacob Garrard MHR was prominent in calls to divest themselves of this embarrassment, no matter the financial penalty (as Union Theatres Ltd would have to be compensated for their recent upgrades) and loss of income. Rev. T. F. Potts, principal of the Methodist Ladies' College, who owned to being a regular movie-goer, could see no harm in the practice.

The move for non-renewal of the United Pictures Ltd lease, when it came due in December 1926, failed. Then in 1929 the Methodist Conference approved a further 10 years' lease, despite objections by Rev. Richard Piper that the surreptitious excision of offensive scenes and subtitles was more difficult with "talking pictures".

=== As cinema ===
The Lyceum doubled as a cinema before the Methodists' takeover: Marius Sestier gave demonstrations of the Lumières' Cinematographe at the theatre from September 1896 and a year later the MacMahon brothers showed the drama "At Duty's Call" in conjunction with some patriotic shorts, celebrating Queen Victoria's Diamond Jubilee. This was short-lived however as other, more suitable, venues were found. The MacMahons took a hall on the other side of Pitt Street and the Lyceum reverted to live theatre.

In June 1905 it was again leased as a cinema for the "American Theatrescope" of Cosens Spencer and his wife and projectionist, Mary Stuart Cosens. Their company became "Spencer's Pictures", in 1908, later Spencer's Theatrescope Company. Another entrepreneur showing films at the Lyceum in 1906 was Herbert Middleton.

When Ebenezer Vickery purchased the building, he allowed the lease of Lyceum as a cinema to continue, as did the Methodist Church, despite misgivings over the content of some films, such as the Burns-Johnson fight of 26 December (Boxing Day) 1908. Spencer's Pictures captured the action, and their film was taken to be showed interstate by Allan Hamilton, under the aegis of the boxing entrepreneur H. D. McIntosh. Churchgoers were assured that their premises were not used to develop the film, nor was any work performed on church premises on any Sunday.

In September 1911 Spencer floated Spencer's Pictures Ltd to take over the assets and goodwill of his moving picture business. Spencer, who was appointed managing director, undertook not to engage in competition for the next ten years. In November 1912 the company joined a consortium General General Film Company with two other film importers and exhibitors. Spencer broke the agreement when his wife leased the New Strand Theatre in Newcastle and showed films there; he also retained lease on the Lyceum, to the exclusion of other companies in the consortium. The Combine, as the merged entity became, used this intransigence to force Spencer into a buyout, whereon he returned to Canada.

On 8 June 1918 the theatre reopened as Hoyt's Lyceum, showing the Fox Film production Les Miserables, starring William Farnum. In November it closed for refurbishment, reopening for Union Theatres Ltd in December 1918 as the New Lyceum. In June 1920 its entrance was remodeled with a cantilevered verandah, following the latest American fashion.
