= The Burns-Johnson Fight =

- Poster from film for Hobart screening
- Produced by: Cosens Spencer
- Starring: Jack Johnson; Tommy Burns
- Cinematography: Ernest Higgins; Mervyn Barrington
- Distributed by: Allan Hamilton
- Release date: 28 December 1908 (Sydney)
- Running time: two hours
- Country: Australia
- Languages: Silent film English intertitles
- Budget: £5,000

The Burns-Johnson Fight (or Burns-Johnson Contest) is a 1908 documentary film of the boxing fight between Tommy Burns and Jack Johnson at Sydney Stadium, Rushcutters Bay, on 26 December 1908 for the World Heavyweight Championship title, which Johnson won. It was produced by Cosens Spencer at the behest of the fight's promoter Hugh D. McIntosh.

Some footage from the film survives today, chiefly of that showing some of the middle rounds of the 14-round fight.

== Plot ==
According to newspaper reports the film showed the following:

- the champions training, swimming, ball punching, sparring, skipping, motor pacing (Burns at Medlow, Johnson at Botany);
- the crowd arriving at the Stadium;
- interior preparations;
- the ring;
- the climax;
- view afterwards.

According to Hugh MacIntosh:

The show lasts two hours, and not only is the whole fight presented in detail with all the doings between the rounds, but films are shown depicting Johnson and Burns going through their training work, swimming, hall-punching, boxing, massaging, and both. The figures are life-size and there is a wonderful absence of flicker. Then there are films showing the crowds flocking to and from the stadium. What a crowd it was! Nothing has ever been seen like it in Australia.

== Production ==
Hugh D. MacIntosh promoted the fight and was also involved in distribution of the film in Queensland in association with E. J. Carroll. Cameras, films and chemicals worth £2,000 were imported into Australian from England along with two camera experts, who took part in filming with two Australian camera operators. A tower was built 16 feet high to capture vision.

Hugh McIntosh arranged for footage to be taken of Burns and Johnson training and this was shown prior to the fight.

MacIntosh later said:

We went to no end of trouble to secure a good film, and had three machines and operator, at work. One of these latter we imported from a leading French firm to ensure the best talent the world could provide us with, and the importation of this operator and his assistants cost us £500. As events determined, the expense was an unnecessary one; for the best of the three films was the one taken by Mr Spencer, the Australian operator... I am of opinion that the French experts did not fully understand the atmospheric conditions of Australia, and, though we have their films as a standby, it is the one taken by Mr Spencer which we are showing all over the world.

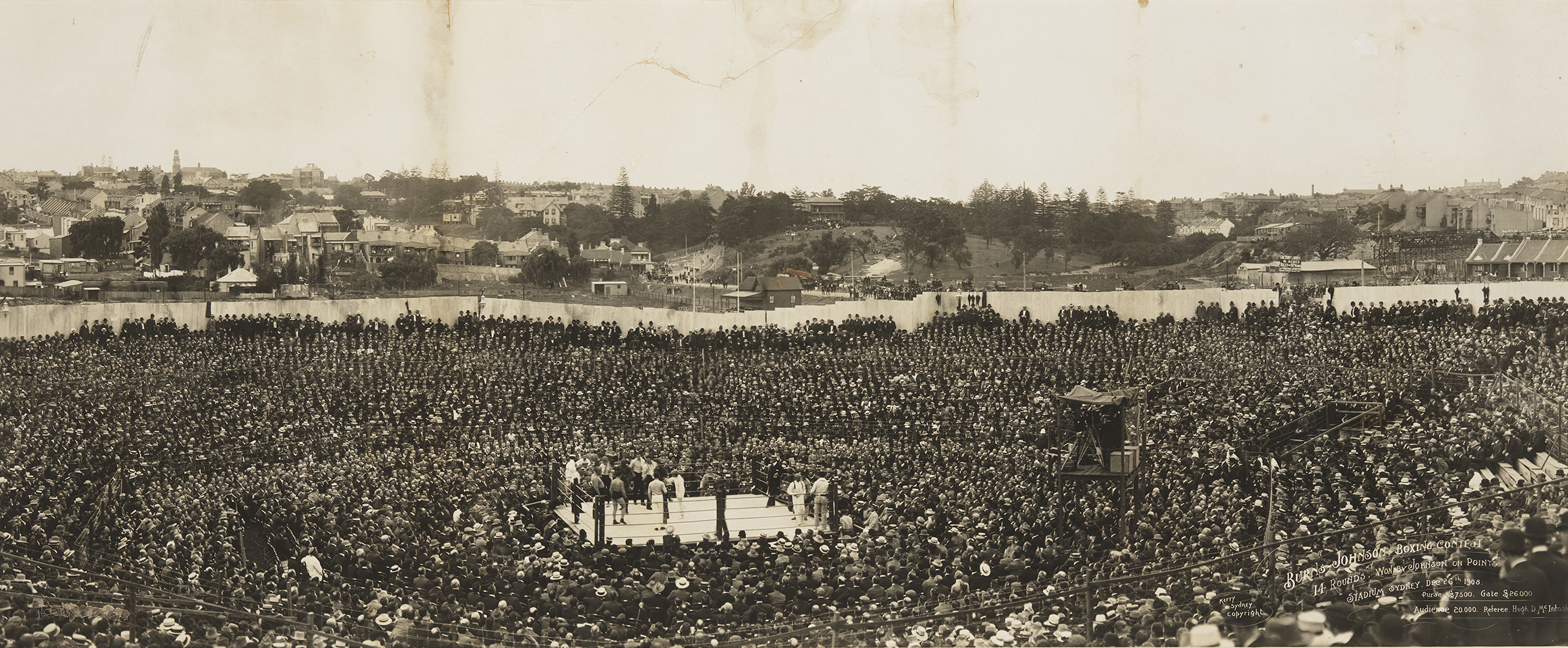
Cameras set up and filming the Burns-Johnson boxing fight, Rushcutters Bay, Sydney, 26 December 1908, by Charles Kerry

Various newspaper advertisements for the film claim the "general manager" of the movie was Alfred Rolfe, an actor and stage manager who later made a number of films for Spencer. It is possible this means Rolfe directed, or was involved in the film's New South Wales distribution.

Raymond Longford was also purportedly involved in filming. However this is unlikely as Longford was acting on the stage in Mackay Queensland in December 1908.

It was also known as Burns vs Johnson.

== Release ==
The film was shown almost immediately after the fight, debuting in Sydney at Rushcutter's Bay Stadium on 28 December 1908, to a crowd between 7,000 and 8,000.

It was distributed throughout the country. It was also seen overseas.

=== Box office ===
The movie was a considerable financial success. According to MacIntosh, the film took £2,114 in one week in Sydney, and £1,738 in Melbourne over four nights.

Theatrical manager Allan Hamilton secured rights to distribute the film in Victoria, Tasmania, South Australia and Western Australia for a reported £1,000. (Later figures put this at £2,000.) It opened in Melbourne on 2 January 1909. Melbourne screenings were so successful people were turned away from screenings.

Spencer was later estimated to have made £15,000 from the film.

=== Critical reception ===
According to a contemporary review of a packed out screening:

The various movements in the game were watched with much concern, and the good and bad moves groaned at or cheered according to deserts, while laughter was provoked at frequent intervals by the half-comical episodes that occurred. To make the show realistic, the usual noises, such as the hounding of a gong, and the hooting of tho crowd when the police stopped the light, were provided, and so well was this latter piece co of stage management arranged that the audience on Saturday night, mistaking the bogus hoots for the genuine article, took up the refrain and themselves became hootingly demonstrative.
