= The Bushman's Bride =

- The Age 11 May 1912
- Produced by: Cosens Spencer
- Production company: Spencers Theatrescope Company
- Release date: 13 May 1912
- Country: Australia
- Languages: Silent film English intertitles

The Bushman's Bride is a 1912 Australian silent film.

It was advertised as "a virile tale of pluck and peril in the wilds of Australia's bush" in 91 scenes.

It is considered a lost film.

It was likely based on a play.

It may also have been called The Bushman and been based on Jo Smith's play The Bushwoman.
