= Nellie Stewart =

Australian actress and singer (1858–1931)

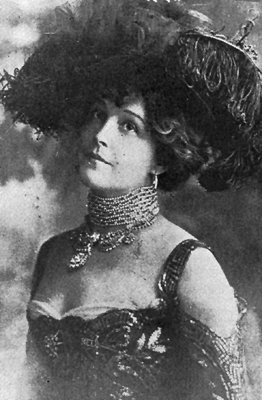
Nellie Stewart c. 1885

Nellie Stewart, born Eleanor Stewart Towzey (20 November 1858 – 21 June 1931) was an Australian actress and singer, known as "Our Nell" and "Sweet Nell".

Born into a theatrical family, Stewart began acting as a child. As a young woman, she built a career playing in operetta and Gilbert and Sullivan operas. In the mid-1880s, she began a long relationship with the theatrical manager George Musgrove. In the 1890s, Stewart had fewer successful roles. Overwork had taken a toll on her voice, and she took several years off from performing, giving birth to a daughter with Musgrove.

In 1902, Stewart had one of her greatest successes in the title role in Sweet Nell of Old Drury and found another success at the end of the decade in Sweet Kitty Bellairs. After this, she continued to perform in both comedy and drama, and worked in theatre management, through the 1920s.

== Life and career ==
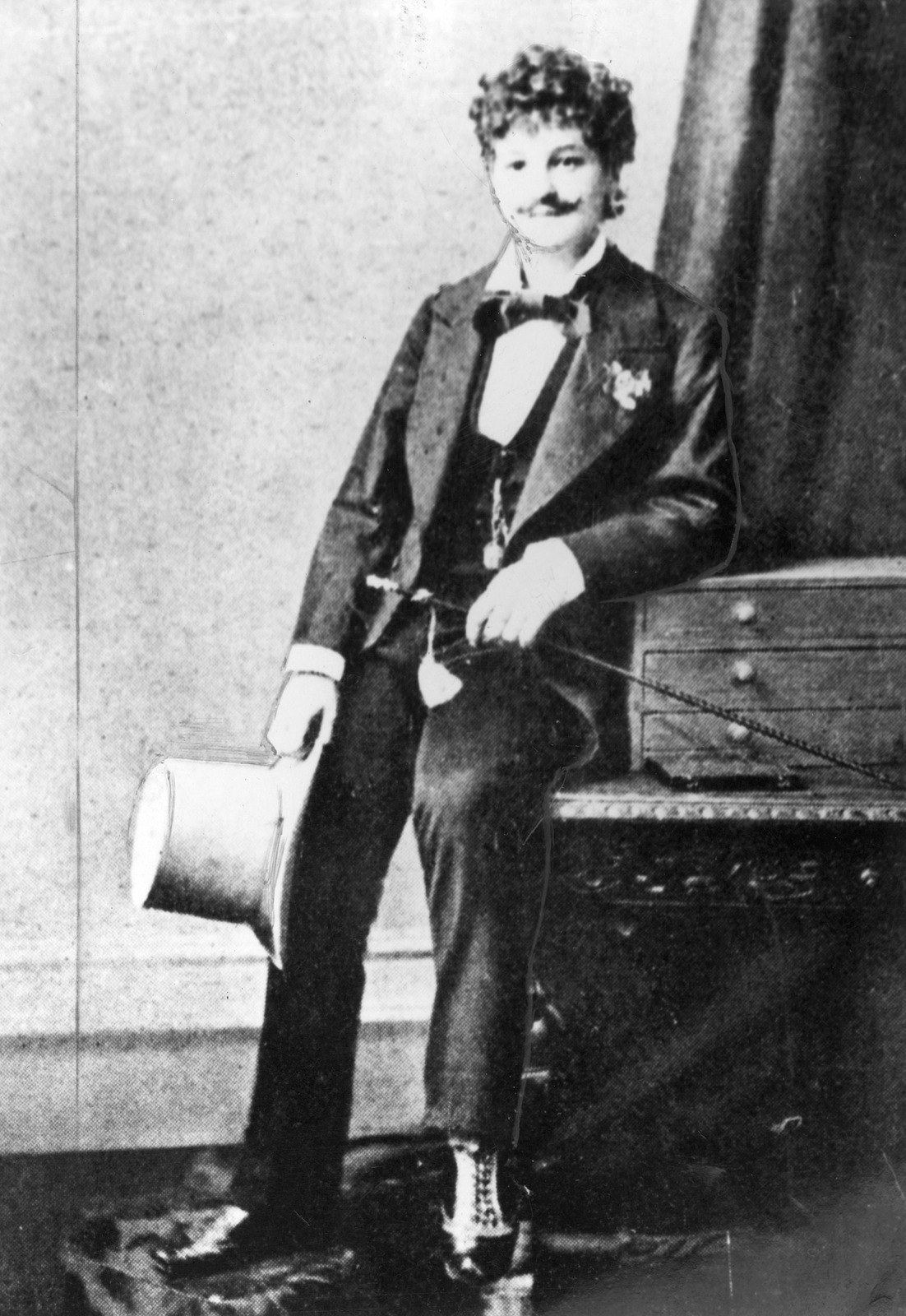
Stewart in costume for Rainbow Revels, 1877

Stewart was born into an acting family in Woolloomooloo, Sydney, on 20 November 1858. Her mother, the English actress "Mrs. Guerin", née Theodosia Yates, was a great-granddaughter of the actors Richard Yates and Mary Ann Yates. Her father, Richard Stewart, was also English and first began working as an entertainer after moving to Australia in the early 1850s. He became a theatre manager, in addition to an actor, and was a partner in the Theatre Royal, Melbourne until it burned down in 1878. Stewart's mother had two previous daughters by James Guerin who also became actresses: Theodosia (Docy) and Margaret (Maggie). The mother sang leading roles in opera after arriving in Australia in 1840. Stewart's parents married in 1857. Stewart was raised in Melbourne, where she attended an old model school and then a boarding-school. She studied dancing with Henry Leopold, fencing with her father and singing with David Miranda. In her 1923 memoir, Stewart recalls having a happy childhood and a love of acting from her earliest years.

=== Early career ===
Stewart began acting by the age of 5, appearing in The Stranger with Charles Kean, and in juvenile roles in pantomime and Victorian burlesque, often alongside her family members at the Theatre Royal, Melbourne, in which her father was a partner. From 1872, she was playing small roles in operetta and in such plays as The Ticket-of-Leave Man at the Princess's Theatre in Melbourne, where her father was co-lessee. When her family produced the touring entertainment Rainbow Revels in 1877, she sang and danced seven of the roles. In H.M.S. Pinafore the following year in Melbourne, she played Ralph Rackstraw. In 1879, with her father's company she toured India and then London and the United States. The next year, she played the principal boy in a pantomime of Sinbad the Sailor, gaining some notice. She left her family's troupe for the first time in 1881 to play in operetta as Griolet in La fille du tambour-major, Suzanne in Madame Favart and the Countess in Olivette with George Musgrove's company. Through the rest of the decade and into the 1890s, she played 35 leading parts in comic opera, including those by Gilbert and Sullivan, with Williamson, Garner and Musgrove. In the Christmas pantomime in 1883–1884, Stewart, as principal boy Jack, fell while when climbing the beanstalk and broke her arm; she finished the performance after the bone was set in the theatre.

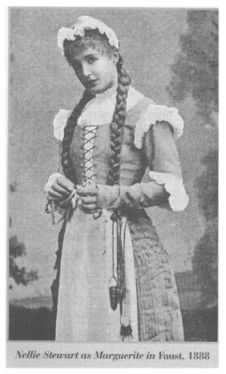
As Marguerite in Faust, 1888

Stewart married Richard Goldsbrough Row on 26 January 1884, which she immediately regretted. The two separated after a few weeks, as Stewart continued starring in Gilbert and Sullivan and in operettas such as Clairette in La fille de Madame Angot. By this time, she had achieved great popularity with audiences, but critics sometimes mentioned a restlessness in her manner on stage. She soon began a three-decade long relationship with Musgrove, whom she greatly admired; he died in 1916. The two traveled to London in 1887, returning the following year 1888, when she starred in the title role in Dorothy and then sang Marguerite in Charles Gounod's Faust. She reportedly overstrained her voice during that opera's Melbourne run of 24 consecutive nights leading, eventually, to the loss of her voice. Faust was followed by more Gilbert and Sullivan.

She starred in Paul Jones in 1889 and soon appeared in London in the title role of Blue-eyed Susan, a burlesque by George Robert Sims. Neither the piece nor Stewart's performance was well received. Stewart felt depressed and left the stage for two years, during which time she gave birth to a daughter with Musgrove, Nancye Doris Stewart (1893–1973). In late 1893, back in Australia, Stewart appeared in nine operas and was again successful over the following two years in the leading roles such as those in Ma mie Rosette and Mam'zelle Nitouche.

=== Later career ===
In the late 1890s, she was again in London, where she rarely performed. She resumed acting, playing as principal boy in the 1899–1900 Christmas pantomime The Forty Thieves at the Theatre Royal, Drury Lane, finally achieving success there. She was unable to return to Drury Lane due to illness the following year, and she soon returned to Australia. Stewart sang the ode "Australia" in 1901 at the opening of the first Australian federal parliament before the Duke and Duchess of York. The following year, she played Nell Gwynne in Sweet Nell of Old Drury, which would become probably her best known role. She became known as "Our Nell" and "Sweet Nell". She next played comic roles in Mice and Men and Zaza.

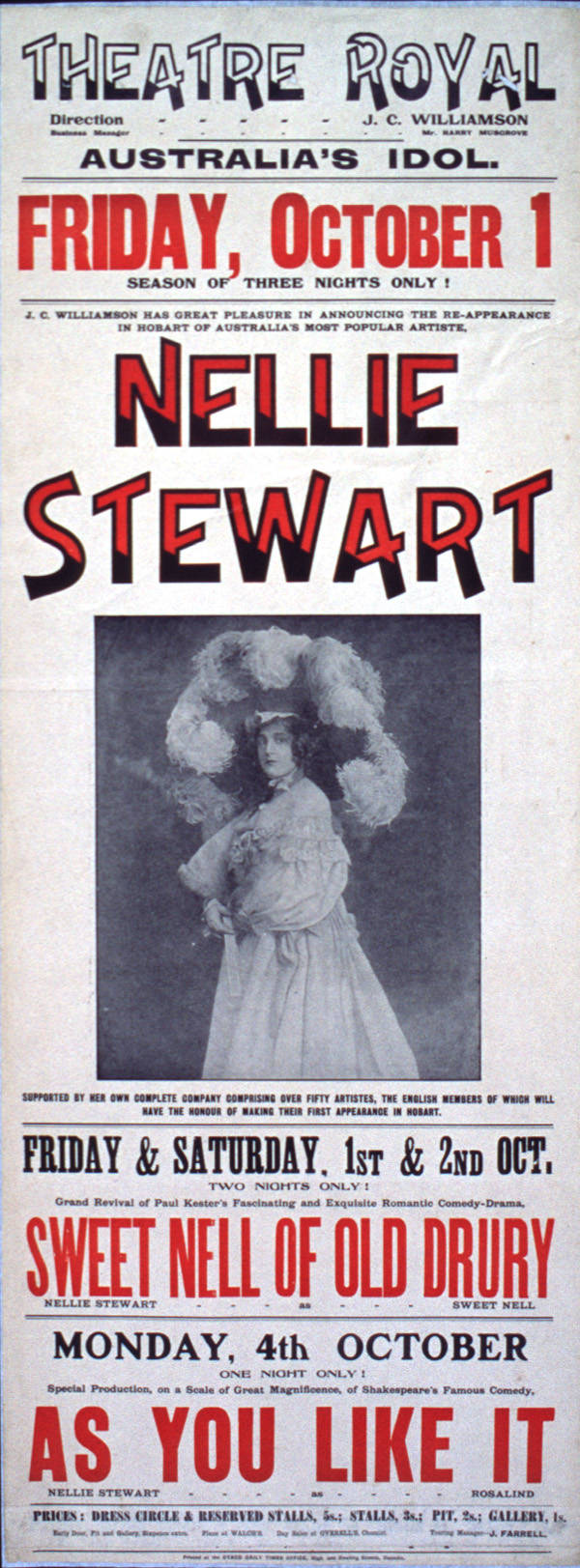
Poster for 1909 performances

Stewart starred in Pretty Peggy and Camille in 1904 and 1905. Then, in America, she was well received in Sweet Nell in San Francisco, California, but while she was briefly away in Colorado, the 1906 San Francisco earthquake destroyed the company's scenery for its upcoming New York repertory season, and they canceled their plans. After returning home in 1907 Stewart accepted the position of first lady patron to Sydney's Newtown rugby union club. Her next success was in 1909 in a long repertory season alternating revivals of Sweet Kitty Bellairs, Zaza, Rosalind in As You Like It, and Sweet Nell. The following year she took the comic part of Maggie Wylie in What Every Woman Knows, followed by Princess Mary in the When Knighthood was in Flower, and the title role in Trilby. She reprised her role in Sweet Nell of Old Drury for the 1911 film version, her only film, directed by Raymond Longford. Stewart found few roles in the following years, and World War I caused difficulty for many Australian theatres; Stewart lost her savings. She toured New Zealand in 1915, receiving warm critical reviews.

She was deeply depressed by grief over the Musgrove's death in 1916 but returned to the stage, at the urging of Hugh Donald McIntosh, in an abridged revival of Sweet Nell at the Tivoli Theatre. She then worked for McIntosh on the production of the London sensation Chu Chin Chow (1916) and later The Lilac Domino (1918). She then became employed in theatrical production for J. C. Williamson Limited. Stewart published her autobiography, My Life's Story, in 1923. After this, she appeared occasionally for charity benefits, once playing Romeo in the balcony scene from Romeo and Juliet, when she was more than 60 years of age, opposite her daughter Nancye as Juliet. She revived her role in Sweet Nell at nearly the age of 70 and then played Cavallini in Romance in 1930.

== Death ==
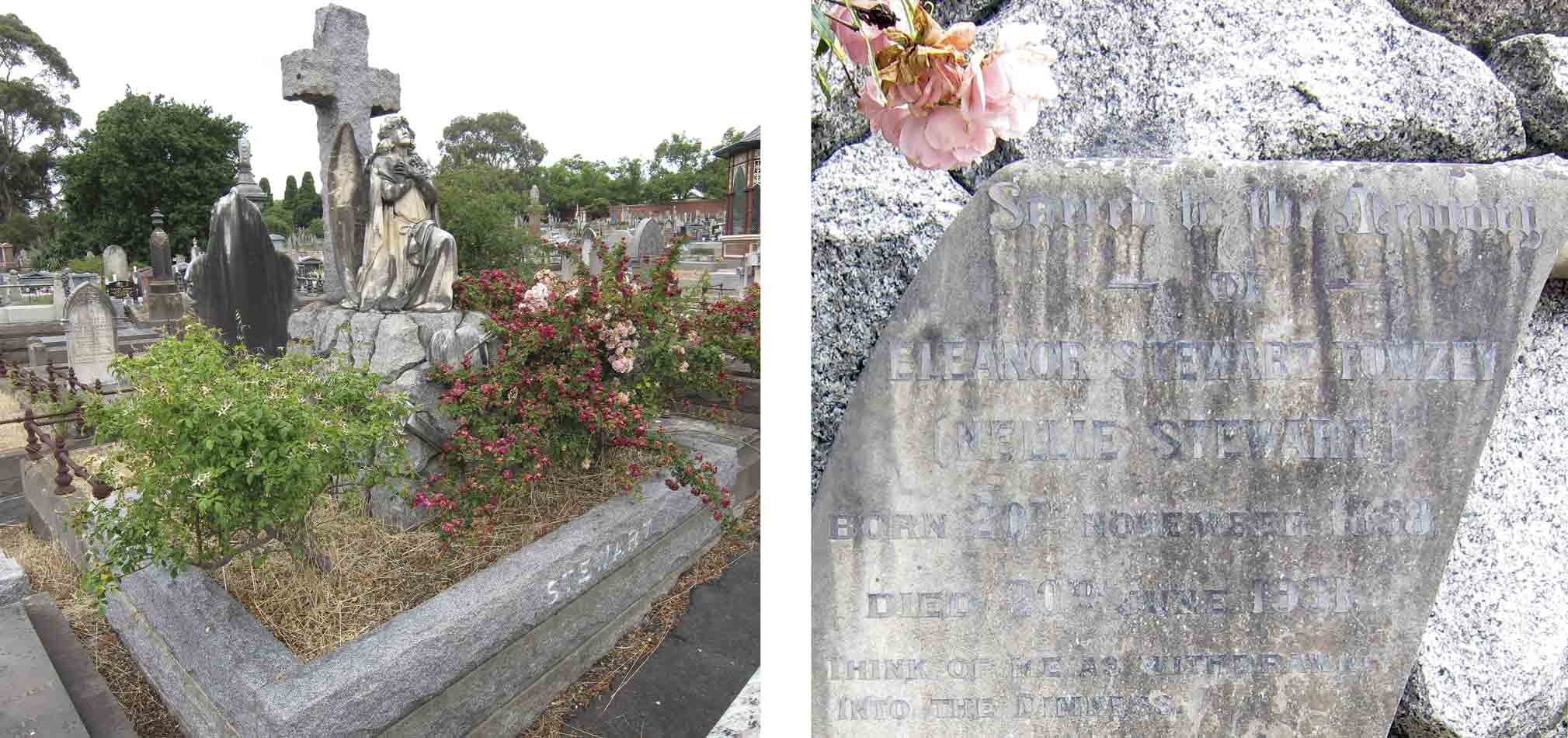
Stewart family grave and Nellie Stewart memorial, Boroondara General Cemetery, Kew, Melbourne

Stewart died, aged 72, on 21 June 1931 at her residence, "Den o' Gwynne", Thompson Street, Mosman, New South Wales. Her illness was reported as short and the result of heart trouble and pleurisy. Crowds gathered in Sydney for her funeral on 24 June 1931. People lined the streets and thronged around St. James' Church, where the first of a number of services was held. Stewart's remains were cremated at Rookwood Necropolis in Sydney after another service, and her ashes were taken to Melbourne. After a further series of services attended by more crowds, her ashes were placed in the family grave at Boroondara General Cemetery in suburban Kew on 27 June 1931.

== Recognition ==
"Nellie Stewart bangles" became a popular fashion accessory for young Australian and New Zealand women in the late 19th and early 20th centuries. Usually worn on the upper arm, they were an emulation of Nellie Stewart's style. In 1886, as a token of thanks for her support of a fund to commemorate the death of General Gordon of Khartoum, Stewart was presented with 25 gold sovereigns. She had them made into a simple bangle which she wore on her upper arm for the rest of her life. Jewellers, such as Angus & Coote, marketed the bangles.

In 1930, a portrait of Stewart was painted by W. B. McInnes. It is in the collection of the National Gallery of Victoria, Melbourne. From 1933, the "Nellie Stewart Memorial Cup" was given as a prize in Junior Theatre League drama contests for the best performance of an Australian-written play. In 1934, "Nellie Stewart Memorial committee" was formed to benefit Sydney hospital, which was supported by Nellie Stewart in her lifetime, and also raised funds for a monument to Stewart. In 1936, a rose garden was established and named the "Nellie Stewart Garden of Memory" at the Botanic Gardens, Sydney. A sandstone and bas relief memorial to Stewart was placed there in 1938.

In 1989, a $1 postage stamp was issued by Australia Post honouring Stewart together with J. C. Williamson. In 2001, an exhibition at the Arts Centre, Melbourne, marked the 70th anniversary of Stewart's death and she was inducted onto the Victorian Honour Roll of Women in the same year.

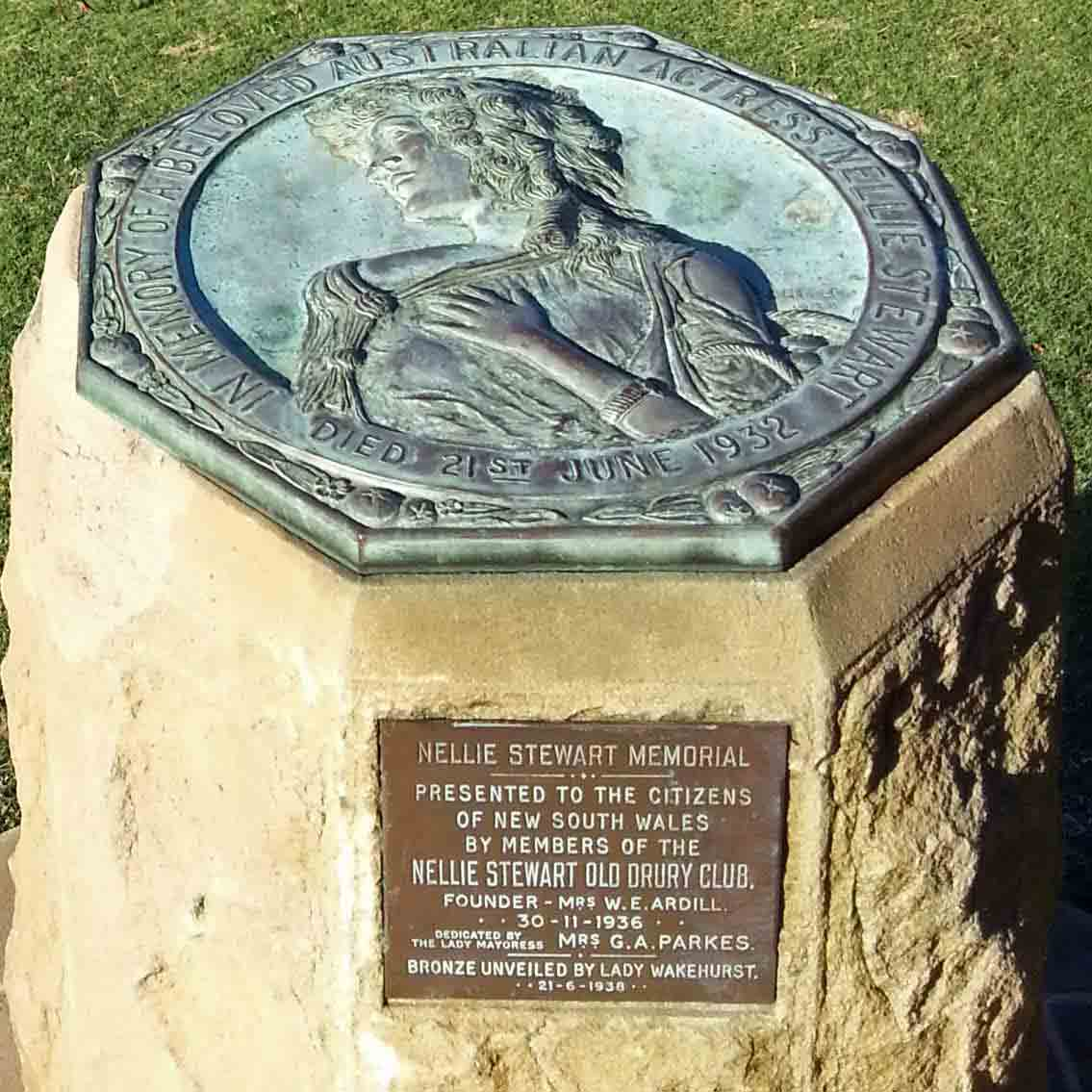
Nellie Stewart memorial, Botanic Gardens, Sydney

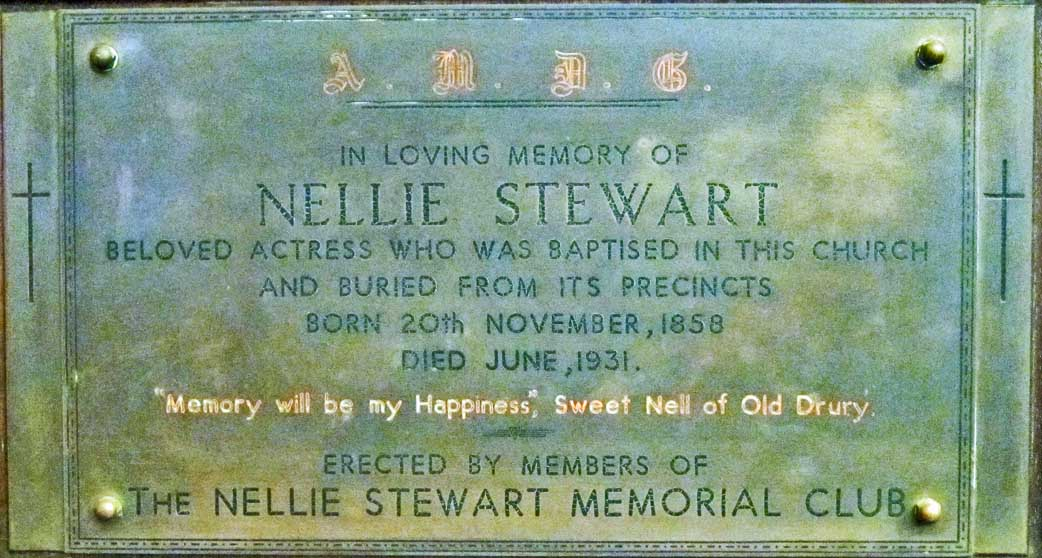
Nellie Stewart memorial, St James' Church, Sydney

Nellie Stewart, Pictures Collection, State Library Victoria

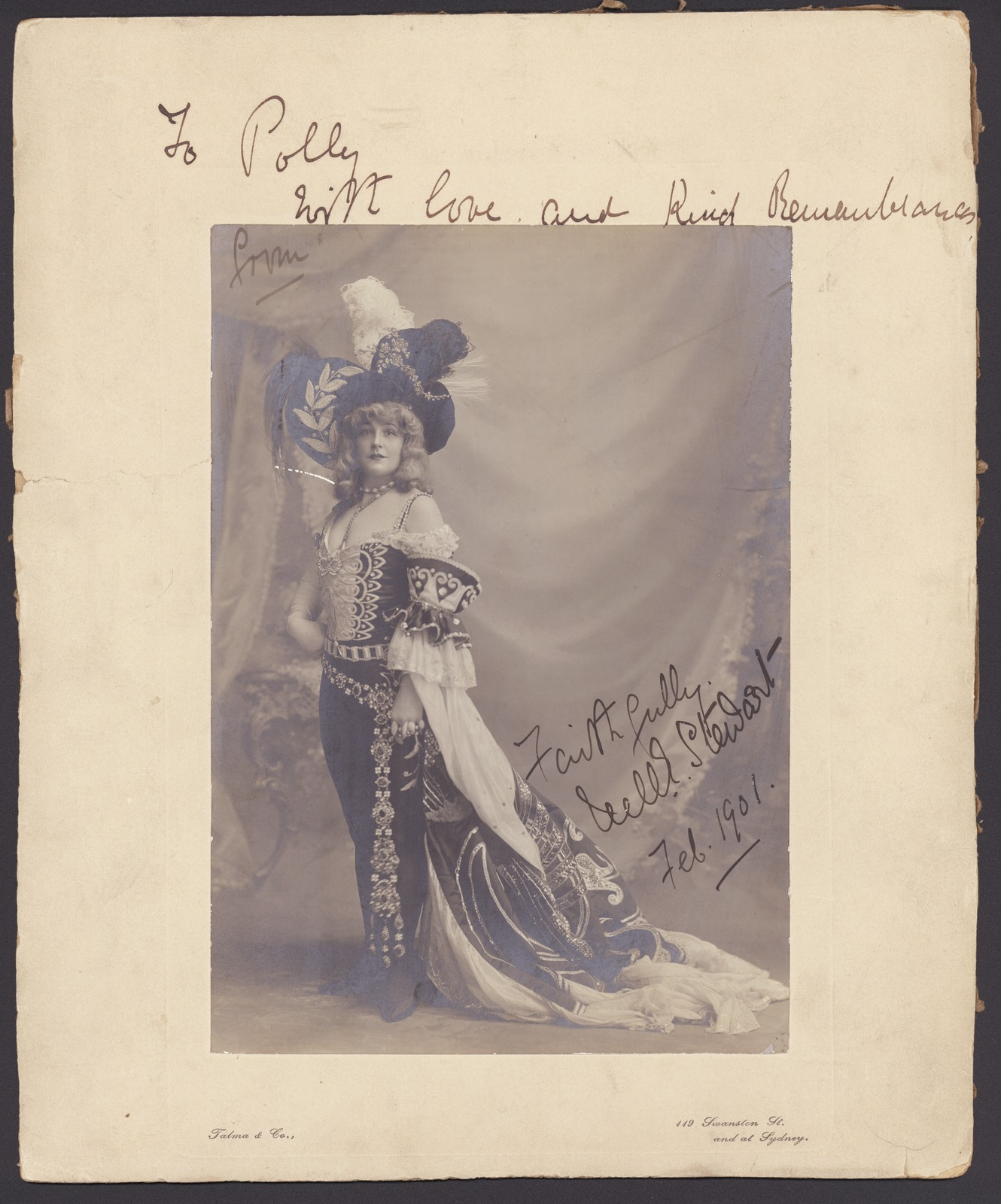

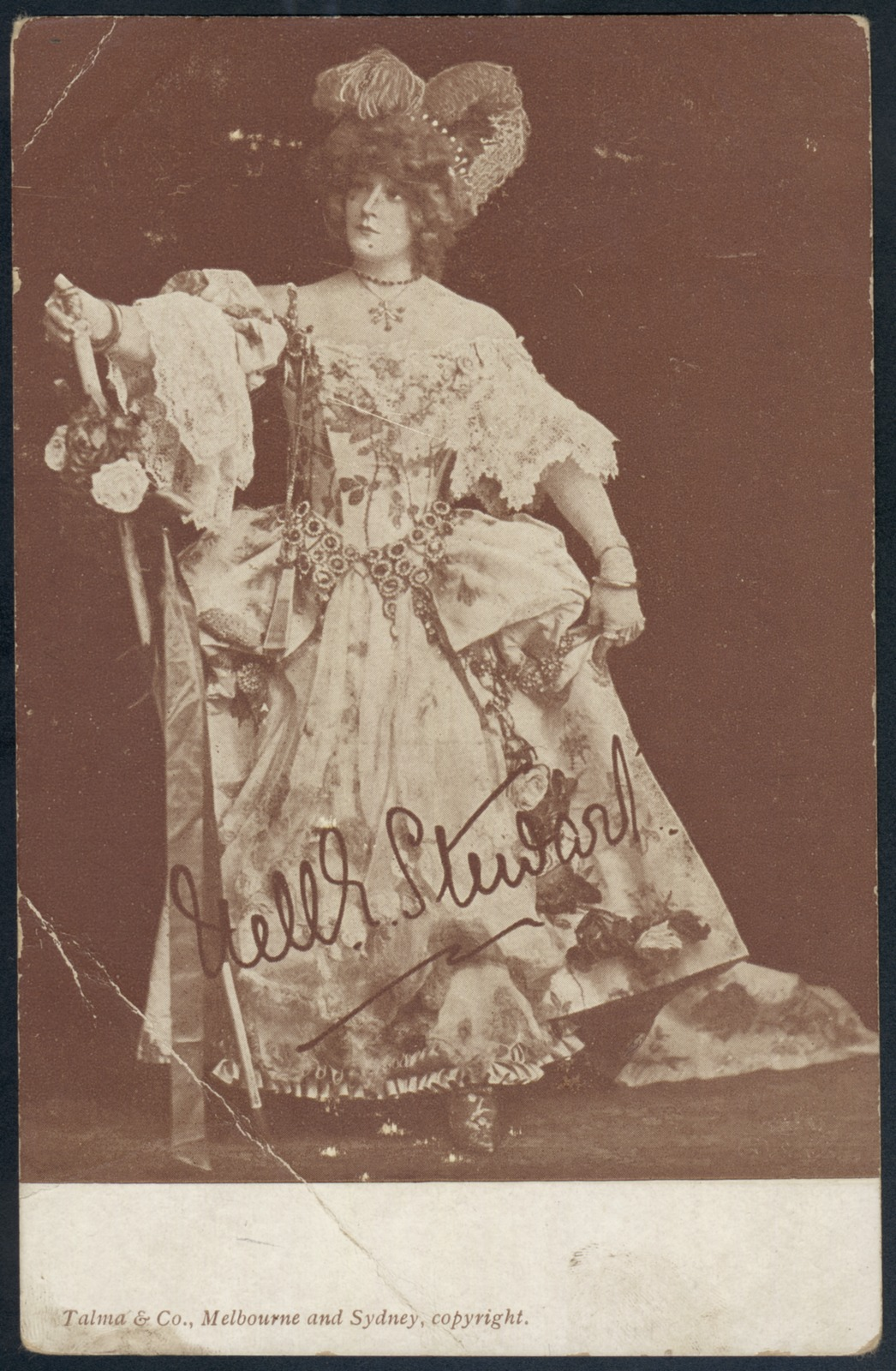

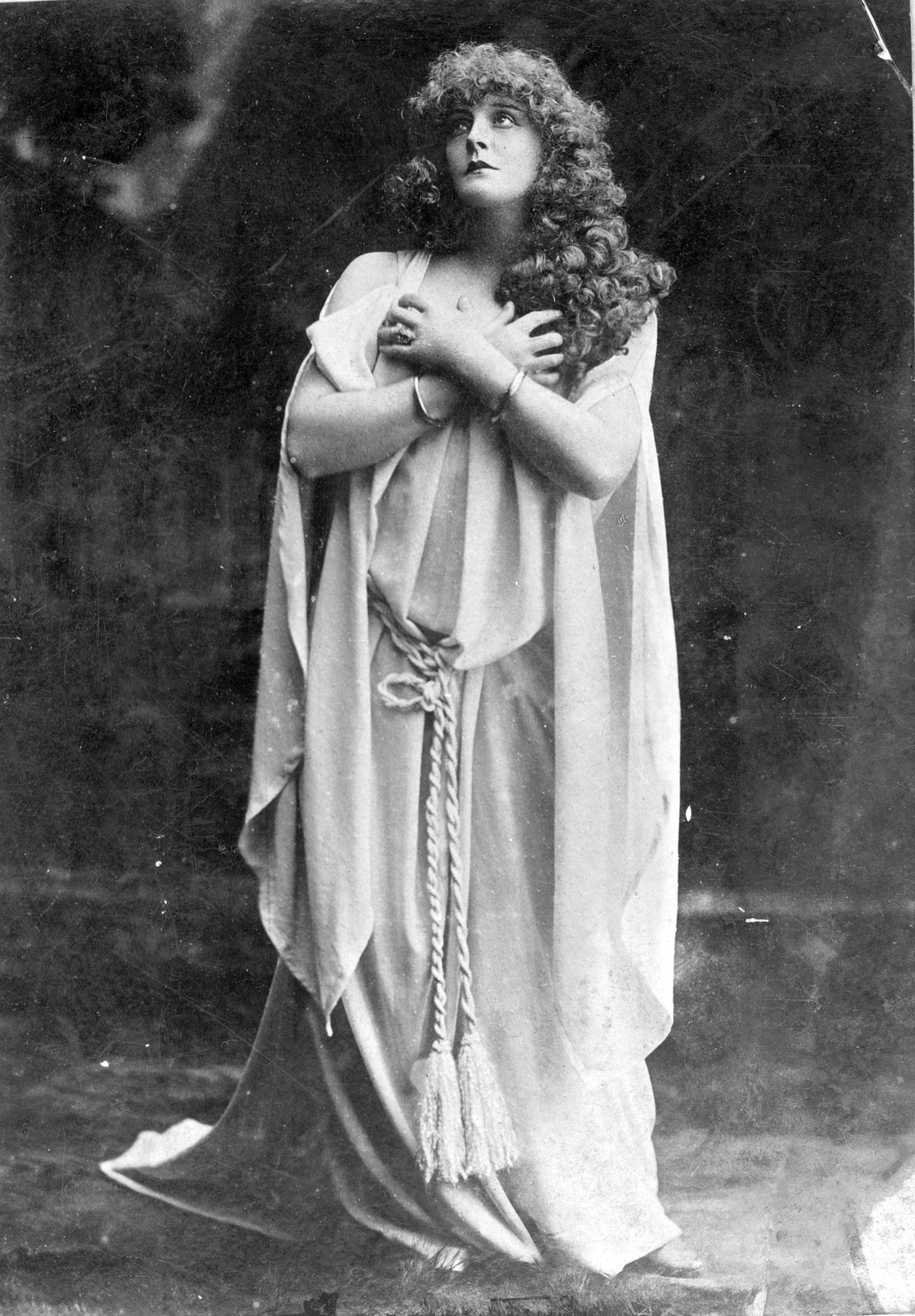

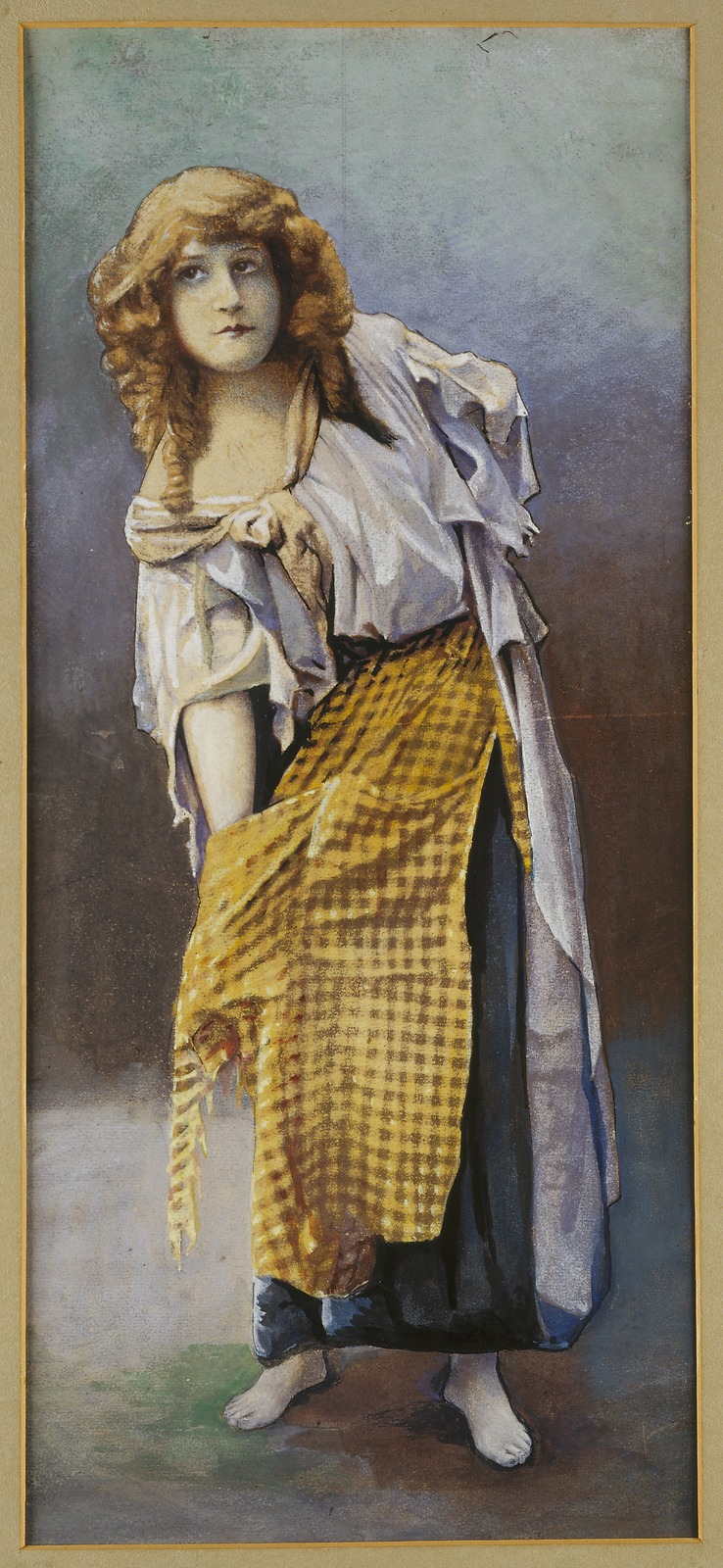

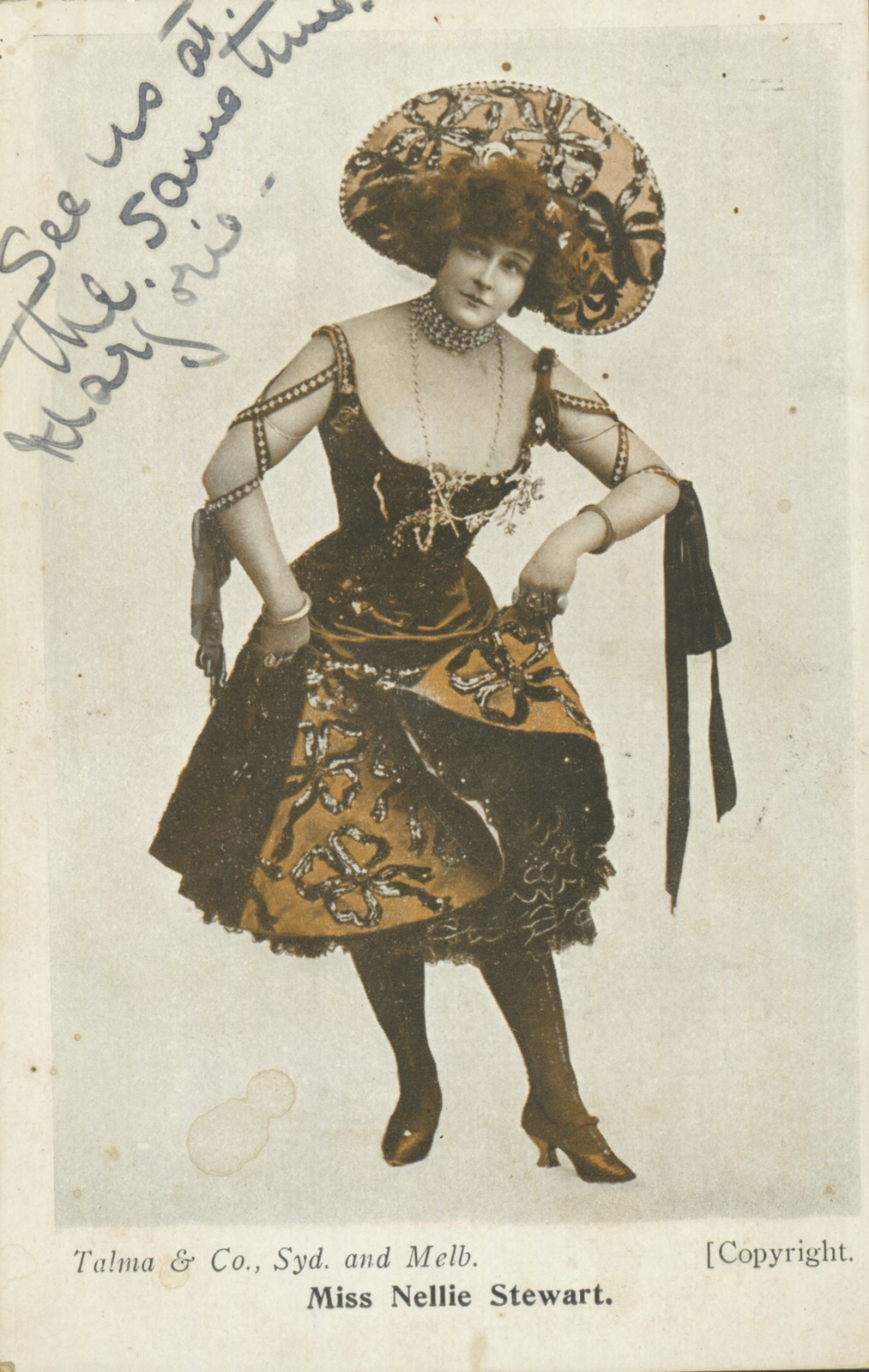

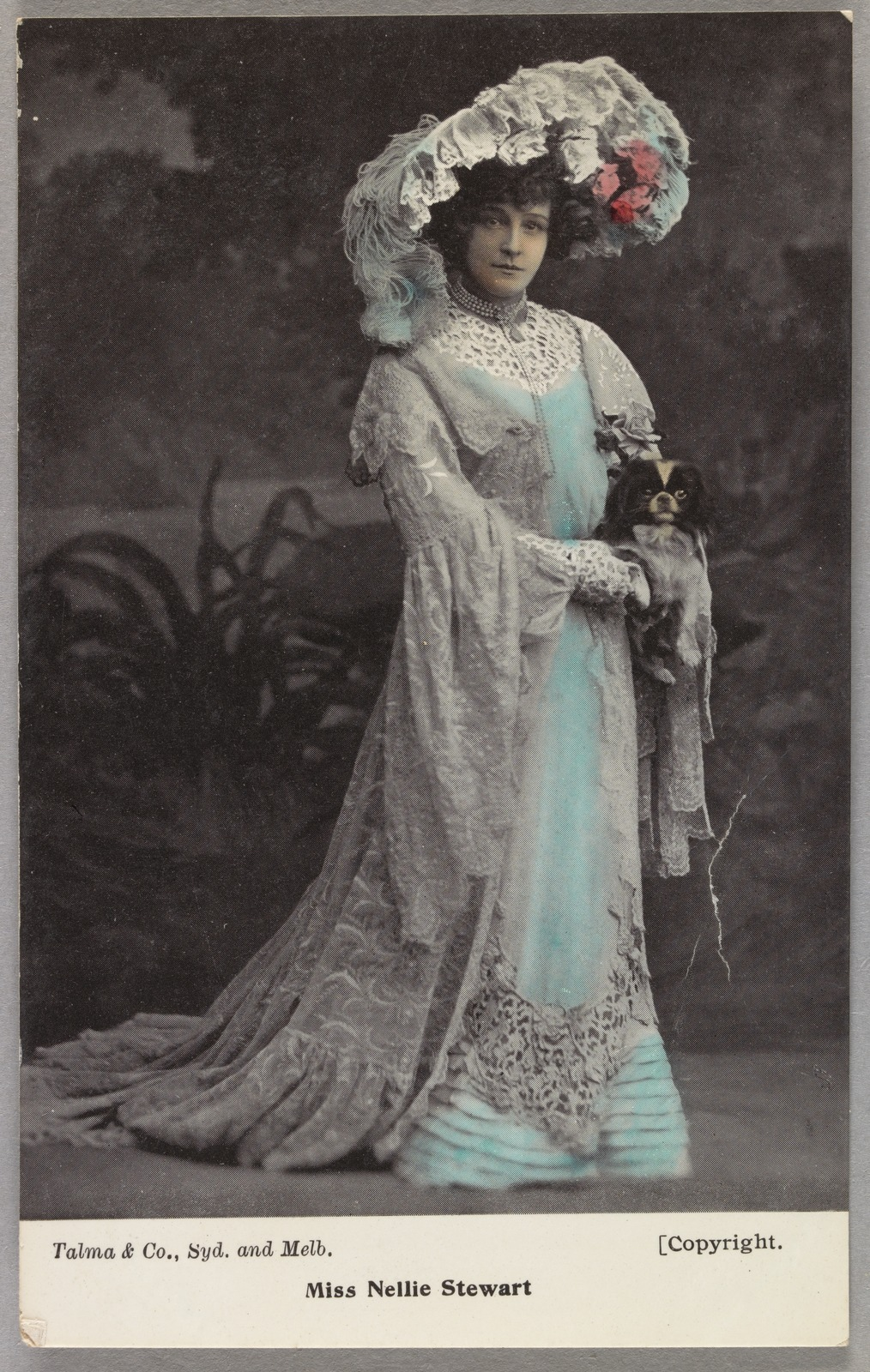

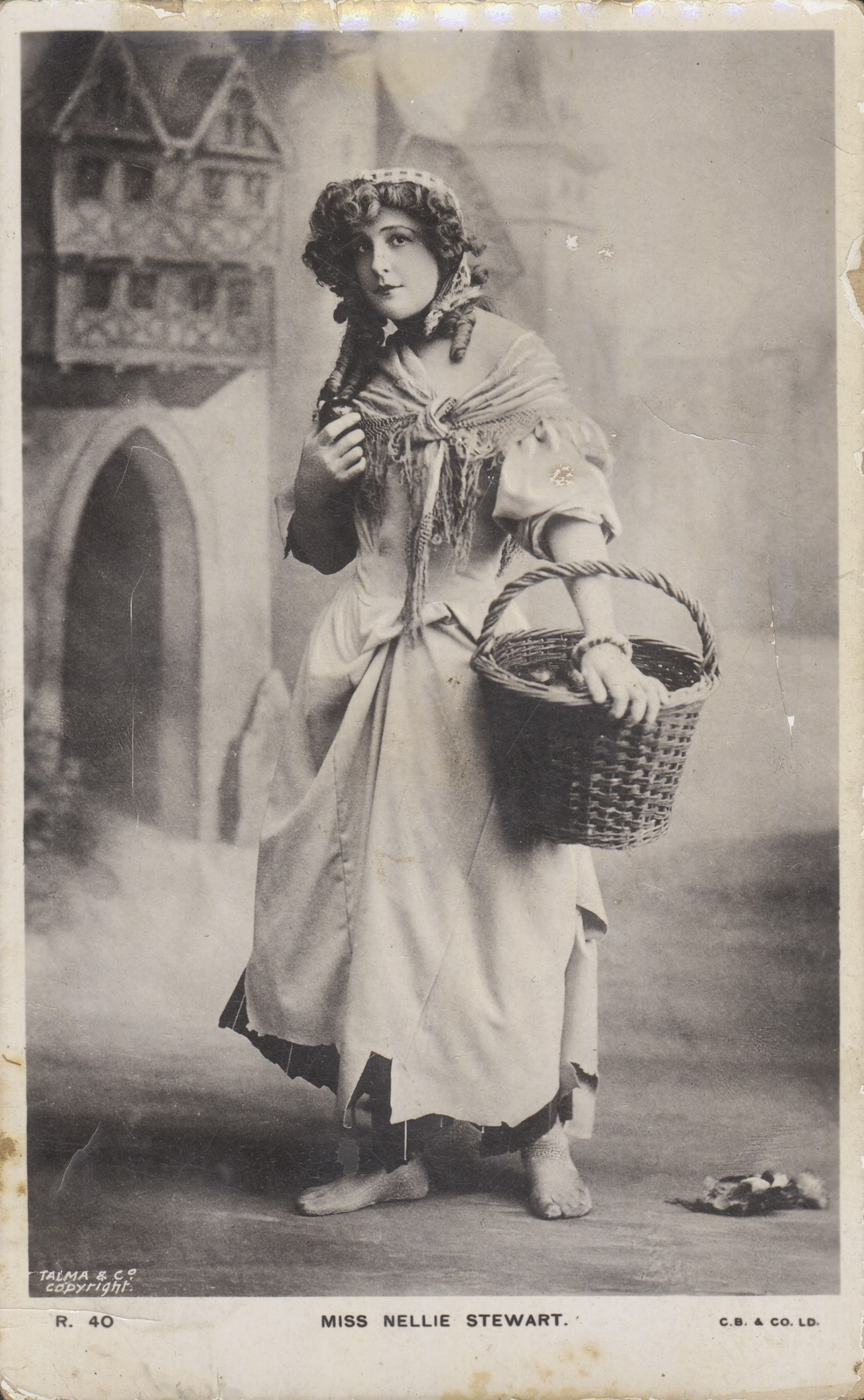

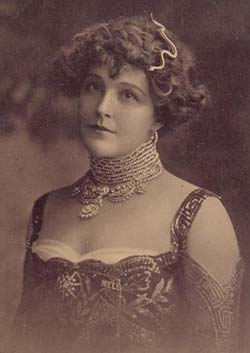

== Sources ==
- Power, Bryan (2004). "Australia's idol – Nellie Stewart" in the Rowville-Lysterfield History Project.
- Serle, Percival (1949). "Stewart, Nellie". Dictionary of Australian Biography. Sydney: Angus & Robertson.
- Van Straten, Frank (2007). "Nellie Stewart 1858–1931", Live Performance Australia Hall of Fame website, retrieved 26 January 2014.
- Moratti, Mel. "Nellie Stewart", Melbourne "Table Talk", 12 April 1889, the Gilbert and Sullivan Down Under website. A search for "Nellie Stewart" on this site reveals many details of her career.
- Stewart, Nellie (1923). My Life's Story, Sydney: John Sands.
