= Ernest Higgins =

Australian cinematographer (1871–1945)

- Born: Ernest Henry Higgins; 9 October 1871; Hobart, Tasmania, Australia
- Died: 28 November 1945 (aged 74); Darling Point, Sydney, Australia
- Occupations: Cinematographer, director, photographer
- Years active: 1903–1945
- Spouse: Elsie May Dickson (m. 1919)

Ernest Henry Higgins (19 October 1871 – 28 November 1945) was an Australian cinematographer during the days of silent film. He was the eldest brother of Arthur and Tasman Higgins. He shot the film The Throwback (1920) for director Arthur Shirley which resulted in Shirley unsuccessfully suing Higgins for breach of contract.

== Life and career ==
In 1900, Higgins rigged up a projector from his father's shop's balcony with a screen on a building across the street. Higgins was working as a bioscope operator by 1903. The following year, he purchased a motion picture camera and began capturing Hobart streetscapes. Eventually Higgin's fascination with photography and cinema took him to Sydney where he found work at Spencer's Pictures filming newsreels and travelogues. Higgins was involved in a train crash at Richmond Station in 1906 while filming a newsreel.

In 1908, Higgins filmed a boxing match between Tommy Burns and Jack Johnson. The film, The Burns-Johnson Fight became a box office sensation, earning £2,114 in one week in Sydney, and £1,738 in Melbourne over four nights.

In 1912, Higgins captured the first moving pictures from an aircraft for the production of the film The Camera in the Clouds. Flying with William E. Hart, who was the first man in Australia to fly a plane, Higgins made eighteen flights over the course of the production. It premiered at the Lyceum Photo Show.

=== The Throwback lawsuit ===
In 1922, Shirley Productions went into voluntary liquidation during the filming of The Throwback and Higgins, who was the production's cinematographer, overtook the business. Higgins was then successfully sued by actress Vera Remée for six weeks worth of unpaid wages. Director Arthur Shirley later sued Higgins for A£1000 in breach of contract, and for the detention of certain films and plates in connection with the movie. Shirley claimed that Higgins had promised to pay money for the preparation and production of the movie to a maximum of A£600. Higgins argued that Shirley had departed from the arrangement between them without his consent, and that he had disagreed with Shirley during filming over scenes that were shot, including the substitution of the female actors. The jury eventually found for Higgins, and awarded him costs. As a result, Shirley declared bankruptcy for the second time in his life, claiming he was the victim of Higgins' "hate, spleen and malice".

== Select filmography ==
- The Burns-Johnson Fight (1908)
- The Life and Adventures of John Vane, the Notorious Australian Bushranger (1910)
- Captain Midnight, the Bush King (1911)
- Captain Starlight, or Gentleman of the Road (1911)
- The Life of Rufus Dawes (1911)
- Sweet Nell of Old Drury (1911)
- The Midnight Wedding (1912)
- Australia Calls (1913)
- A Long, Long Way to Tipperary (1914) – producer
- The Shepherd of the Southern Cross (1914)
- The Church and the Woman (1917)
- The Woman Suffers (1918)
- The Waybacks (1918)
- The Throwback (1920) (abandoned)
- East Lynne (1922)
