= Renee Lees =

Australian pianist (1883–1966)

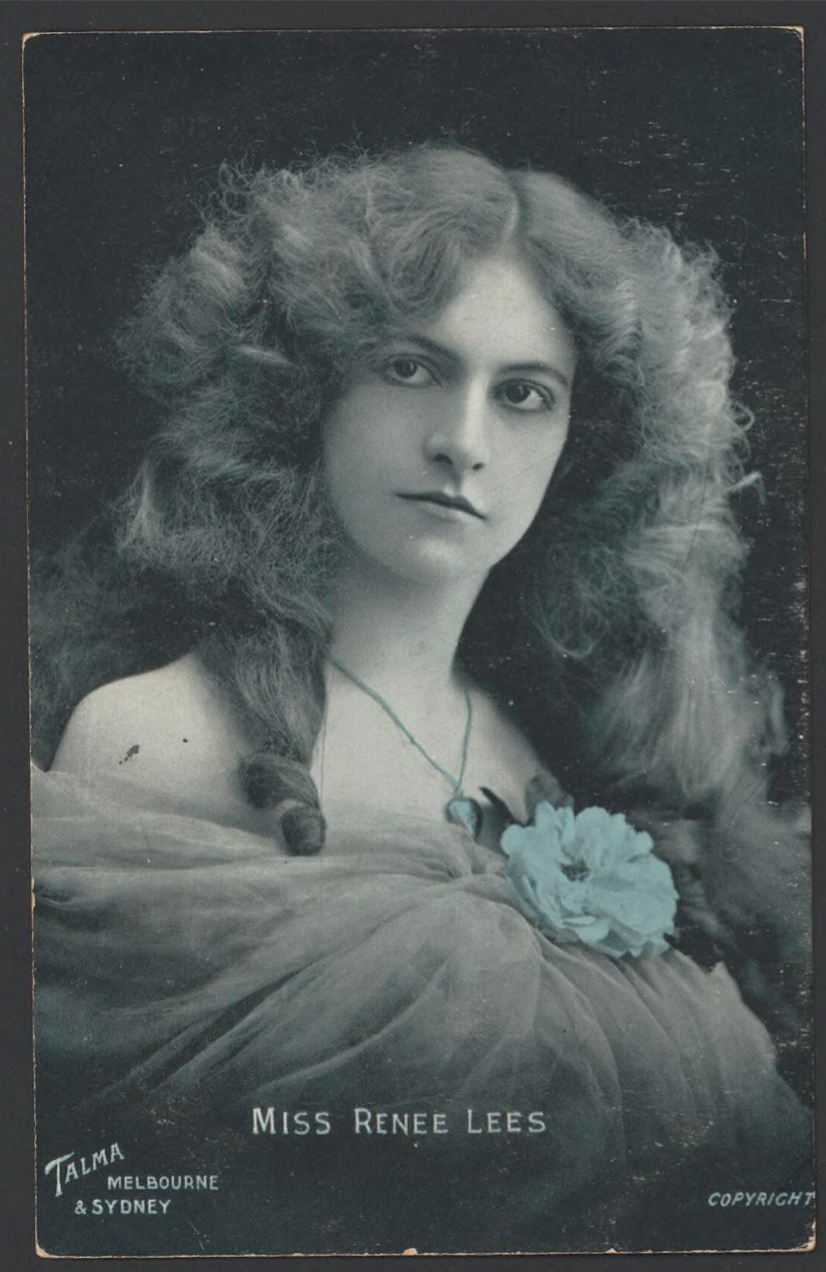
- Lees on a 1920 Talma & Co. postcard

Background information
- Also known as: Renee Perry
- Born: Renee Evelyn Mary Lees; 1883; Sydney, New South Wales
- Died: 17 December 1966 (aged 82–83) Petersham, New South Wales
- Occupations: Pianist, accompanist, theatre organist
- Instruments: Piano, organ

Renee Evelyn Mary Lees (1883 – 17 December 1966) was an Australian pianist, hailed as a child prodigy, later known as a theatre organist.

== History ==
Lees was born in Sydney late in 1883 to Mary Louisa Lees, née Shirley, (died 1915) and George Edward Lees (died 1919), both school teachers, who married in 1872.

She was educated at the Blackfriars Superior Public Girls School, where in 1890 her musical aptitude was first revealed. She received instruction in pianoforte from Sydney violinist Josef Kretschmann (c. 1837 – 30 April 1918). She gave her first public concert in Glebe, New South Wales in 1893.

In 1894, when not yet 11, it was said that she played Bach and Beethoven, Chopin and Liszt " . . . with a refinement of intelligence and taste which cannot be regarded as other than an instinct."

She undertook a three months' tour of New Zealand in 1899, as accompanist to juvenile violinist Ernest Toy. before proceeding to London, accompanied by her mother, for further instruction with Georg Liebling. She received good notices, but returned to Australia before a year had elapsed, a sure sign that she had not been accepted in the front rank of performers. She found favour in George Musgrove's troupe, as accompanist to important singers, such as Sylvia Blackston.

She was hired to play the Wurlitzer organ at the Rialto Theatre, Sydney, when it opened in 1922, and in 1928, when Melbourne's State Theatre's Wurlitzer organ (now in Moorabbin Town Hall) was opened by Frank D. Lanterman, Lees accompanied him at the minor console.

In the 1940s and 1950s she performed regularly on radio, as soloist and accompanist, piano and organ, mostly on AM radio 2NA and 2FC. She died at Petersham, New South Wales.

== Family ==
Renee Lees had a brother Percy S(hirley) Lees (c. 1877 – 6 September 1959), a teacher, and secretary of the N.S.W. Cyclists' Union 1903–1906. Her sister Elsie (died 23 August 1951) married Alfred Ernest Quinton.

She married or otherwise changed her name to Renee Perry, with which name she died, but still known professionally as Lees.
