= Queen's Hall, Perth =

Demolished building in Perth, Western Australia

Coordinates: 31.95267°S 115.857103°E

Queen's Hall was an entertainment and conference venue on the corner of William and Murray streets, Perth, Western Australia, a project of the trustees of Wesley Church, and was opened in 1899.

== History ==
The foundation stone was laid by Governor Smith's wife on 5 September 1898 and opened on 19 April 1899. The hall, 18 by 30 metres (60 by 100 ft), with a dome-shaped ceiling, 13 metres (42 ft) high, was lit by clerestory windows. It was designed to seat around 1,500 people. The Romanesque building was designed by architects Wilkinson and Smith.
