= The Life and Adventures of John Vane, the Notorious Australian Bushranger =

1910 film

- Directed by: S. A. Fitzgerald
- Based on: John Vane, Bushranger ed. by Charles White
- Produced by: Cosens Spencer
- Starring: Jim Gerald; Raymond Longford
- Cinematography: Ernest Higgins
- Edited by: Ernest Higgins
- Production company: Spencer's Theatrescope Company
- Distributed by: E. J. Carroll (Queensland)
- Release date: 12 March 1910
- Country: Australia
- Languages: Silent; English intertitles

The Life and Adventures of John Vane, the Notorious Australian Bushranger is a 1910 Australian silent film about the bushranger John Vane, who was a member of Ben Hall's gang. It was the first dramatic film from Cosens Spencer who was a key producer of early Australian movies.

It is considered a lost film.

== Synopsis ==
The film starts with John Vane accepting a wager that he wouldn't bail up a Chinese man. Then Vane wins his bet by robbing a Chinese man, leading to headlines which say "Robbery Under Arms by John Vane" and Vane fleeing to the bush with his sweetheart. Later adventures include his capture and release of his sweetheart; the sticking up of the Keightley Homestead; the shooting of Michael Burke, which leads to Vane joining the Ben Hall gang; Vane's change of heart and surrender to Father McCarthy. He serves fifteen years in prison and after release retires comfortably.

The chapter headings were:

1. The beginning of a downward career
2. bailing up a Chinaman
3. His capture and release by his sweetheart
4. Michael Bourke horse stealing
5. The Reward for his Capture
6. Sticking up the Bank at Carcoar
7. Police Surprised by the Gang
8. "That's My Watch."
9. Sticking up at Bathurst
10. Police in Pursuit
11. The Bushranging Camp; the Warning
12. When Rogues Fall Out
13. Vane Joins Ben IHali for Raid on Keightley Homestead
14. The Bush; the Gang's Demand
15. Next Morning; the Demand Satisfied
16. The Quarrel; Vane's Remorse and Farewell to the Gang
17. Notice of Reward
18. A Mother's Devotion
19. Surprised, and Surrender of Vane to Father McCarthy
20. Vane in the Hands of the Police on his Way for Trial
21. Sentenced to 15 Years
22. Six Years Elapse: Released for Good Conduct; Thank God, "Free."
23. Thirty Years Elapse; Vane Surrounded by his Family; " Peace at Last."
24. " Often from Evil Cometh Good."

According to a contemporary report "the comic element is not forgotten, for the scene in which Vane is shown bailing up a Chinaman and discovers the booty hidden in the horse's tail, and the various intercits of the Celestial to avoid detection of the plant are not without their humorous side. Most attention however, is paid to the sensational."

== Cast ==
- Jim Gerald
- Lance Vane
- Max Clifton
- Raymond Longford
- Miss Watts Phillips

== Production ==
John Vane was the last surviving member of Ben Hall's gang. His memoirs had been published posthumously in 1908.

It was the first dramatic film from Cosens Spencer, who established a production unit in June 1908 to make newsreels and scenic short films. This unit was headed by Ernest Higgins who shot John Vane. Raymond Longford reportedly features in a lead role.

The film was reportedly shot at Brookvale and Manly in Sydney. According to The Bulletin:

Brookvale, along the ocean past Manly, figures largely in Spencer’s film of "John Vane, Bushranger," pictured not so long ago, wherein the feminine "comic relief" is pantomimed by Miss Watts-Phillips, who "gives way" under the influence of a loaded revolver held at her head by the hero-villain, a thing most of us would be guilty of in the same circumstances.

== Reception ==
The film was advertised as "Our Own Production".

=== Critical ===
The critic from the Argus praised the "splendid backgrounds of the sunny New South Wales bush" and said the movie compares "very favourably with the best foreign films".

The Evening News called it "a first-class piece of photographic art".

Table Talk wrote, the film "is depicted in a wonderfully-realistic manner, .What makes this particular picture doubly interesting is that the work is all Australian, Australian artists who know the bush; most of them fine horsemen, have been fitted, into glimpses of the sketches of grand and' wild Australian scenery, and the result is a refreshing, wholesome drama of Australian early history."

The Sydney Morning Herald wrote "for scenes of wild excitement and daring [the film ] leaves nothing to be desired." The Daily Telegraph said "The story is of purely Australian interest and coloring, and is worked out Dy capital photography, skilful selection of incidents, and uncommonly clear production."

The Herald called it "a credit to all concerned... the story is excellent."

=== Box office ===
Box office response was popular throughout Australia. The Lithgow Mercury said " it caused a sensation" on its initial release at the Lyceum in Sydney. The Sydney Morning Herald said the film was held on at that cinema "owing to its popularity."

Although Spencer was purportedly dissatisfied with the final product, he went on to become a notable backer of early Australian movie production.
