= The Combine (Australian film industry) =

1913 Australian collaboration

- Founded: 1913
- Headquarters: Australia

The Combine was the name given to the association between exhibitor Union Theatres and the production and distribution company Australasian Films on 6 January 1913. The Combine had a powerful influence on the Australian film industry of the 1910s and 1920s and was frequently the subject of criticism for hampering Australian production, including by filmmakers such as Raymond Longford.

== History ==
On 4 March 1911, the firm of Johnson and Gibson merged with J and N Tait to form Amalgamated Pictures. This company then merged with the General Film Company of Australia, West's Pictures and Spencer's Pictures; then, in January 1913, it merged again with Greater J. D. Williams Amusement Company.

In some states, the name "Union Theatres" remained the recognised name despite the "Combine" name. In June 1931, it was reported that a film production company under the dual control of Union Theatres and Bert Bailey were making "talkies" in Sydney in their studios at Bondi Junction. The Bondi Junction Studios had made five short films, and were then in the process of adding a soundtrack to a new version of the previously silent documentary film With Mawson in the South. The company name was also reported as "Union Theatres-Australasian Films" in 1931.

The Combine dominated the Australian film industry for a number of years and later evolved into the Greater Union organisation.
