= List of Universal Pictures films (1912–1919) =

This is a list of films produced or distributed by Universal Pictures in 1912–1919, founded in 1912 as the Universal Film Manufacturing Company. It is the main motion picture production and distribution arm of Universal Studios, a subsidiary of the NBCUniversal division of Comcast.

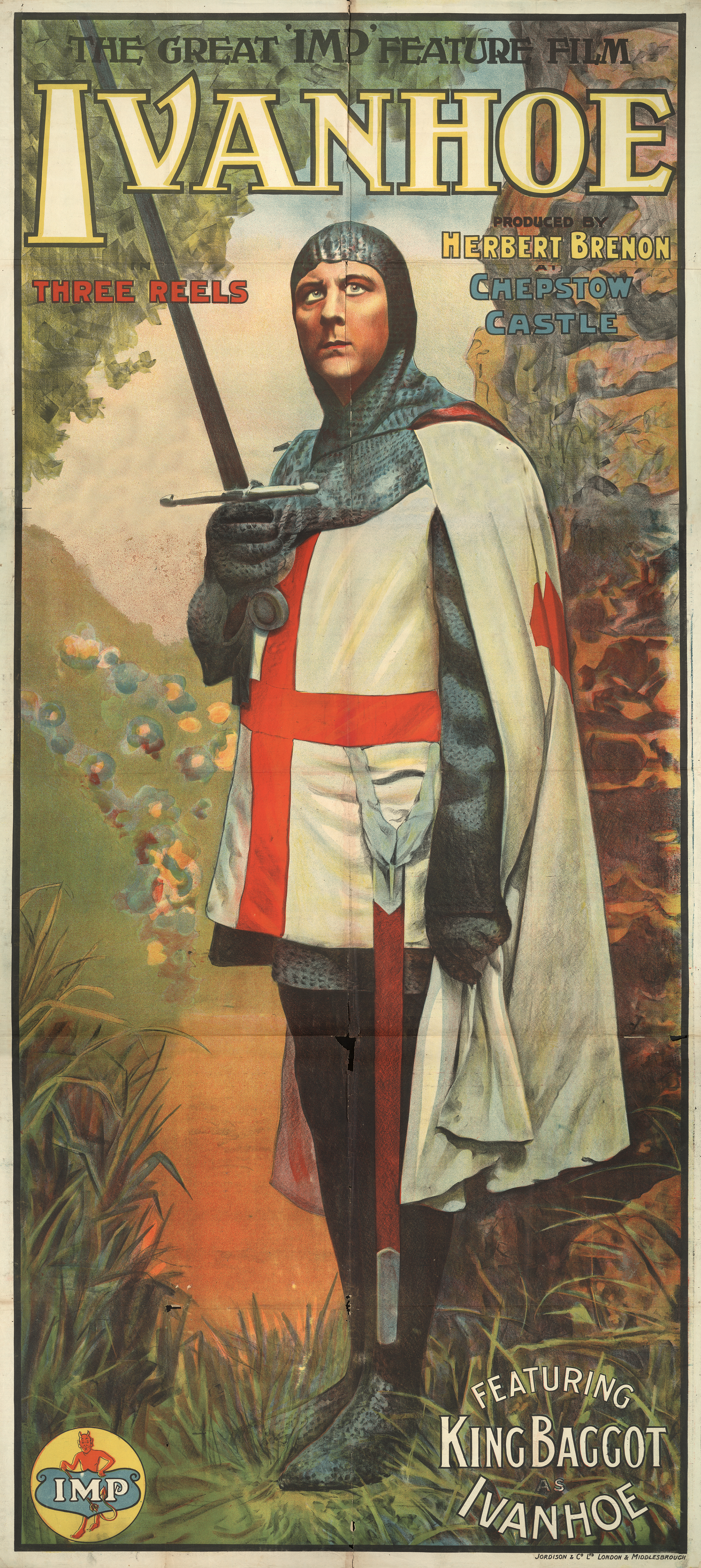
Poster for Ivanhoe (1913)

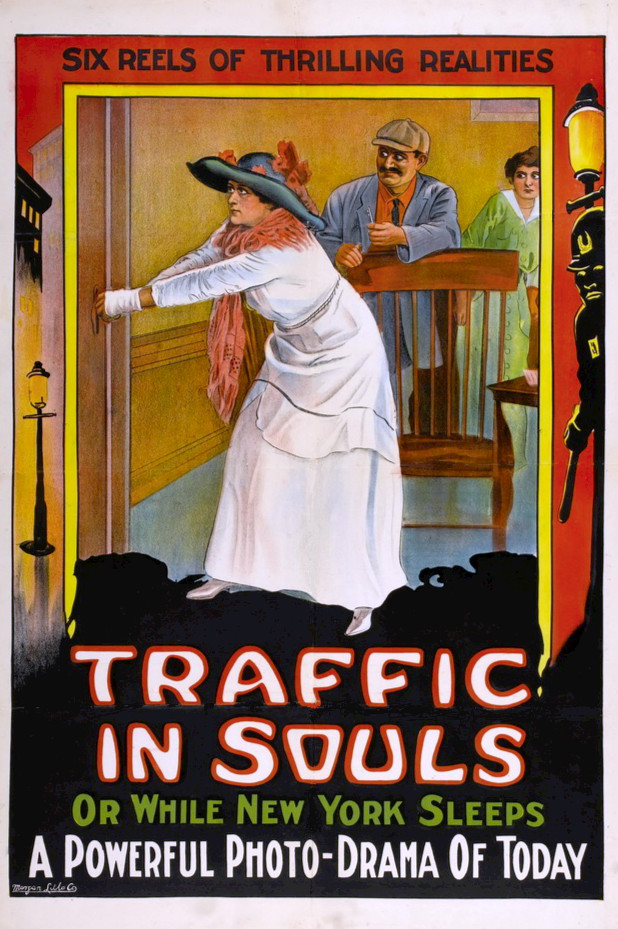
Poster for Traffic in Souls (1913)

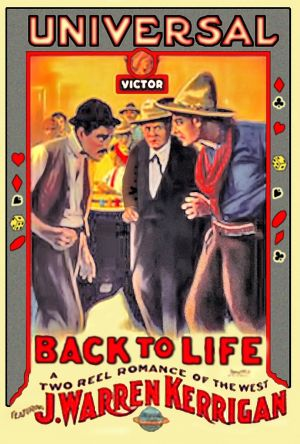
Poster for Back to Life (1913)

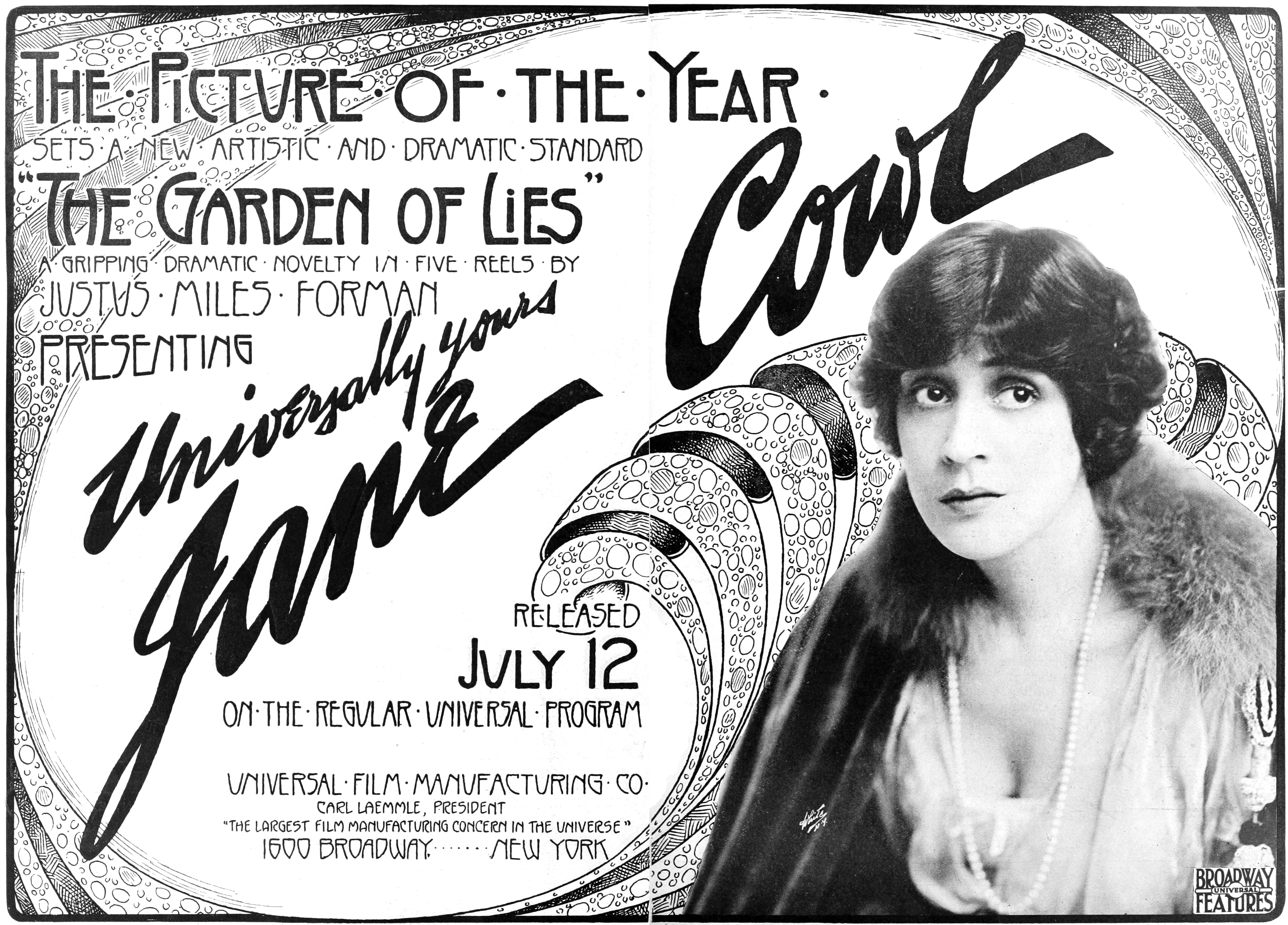
Ad for The Garden of Lies (1915)

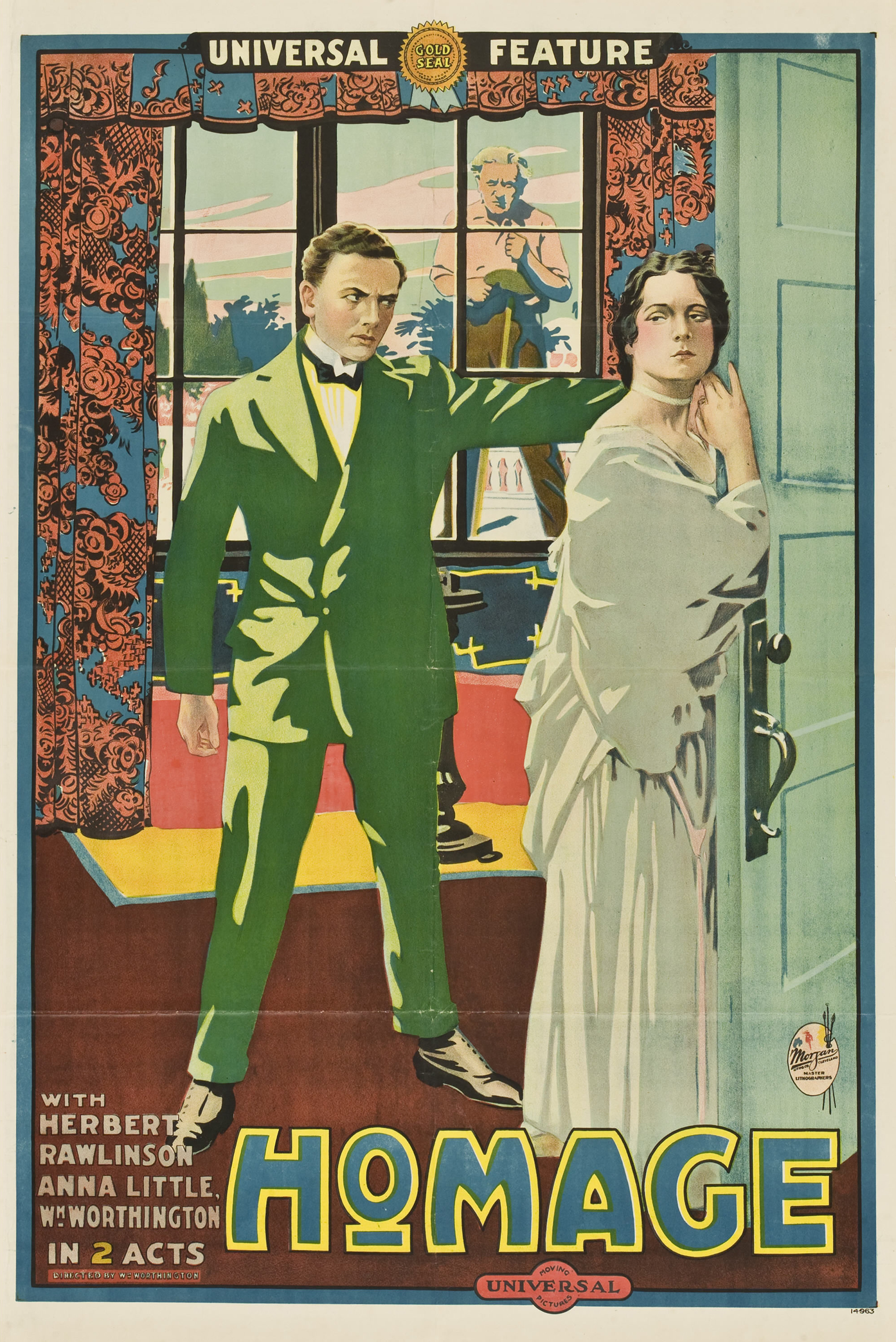
Poster for Homage (1915)

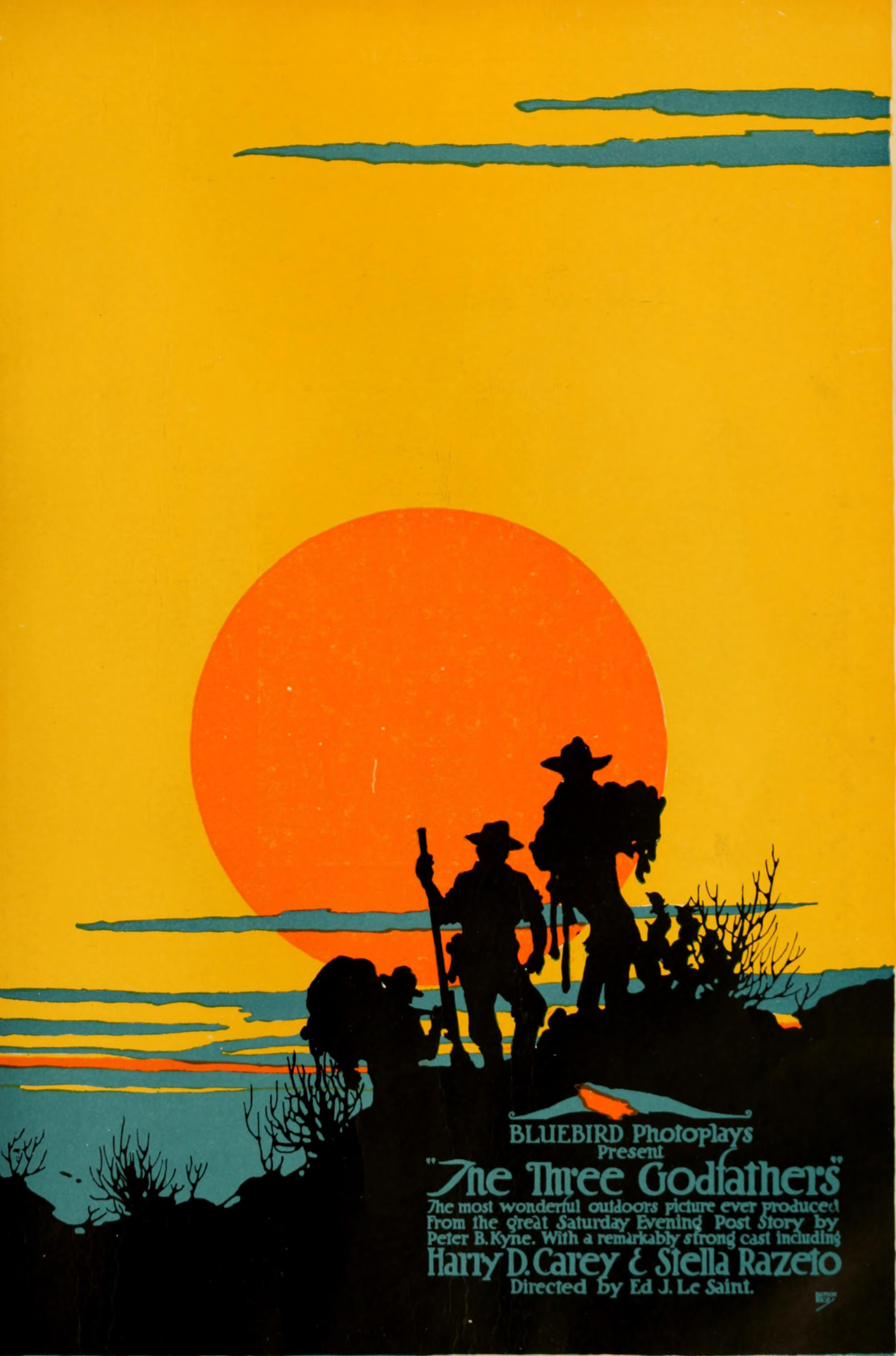
Poster for The Three Godfathers (1916)

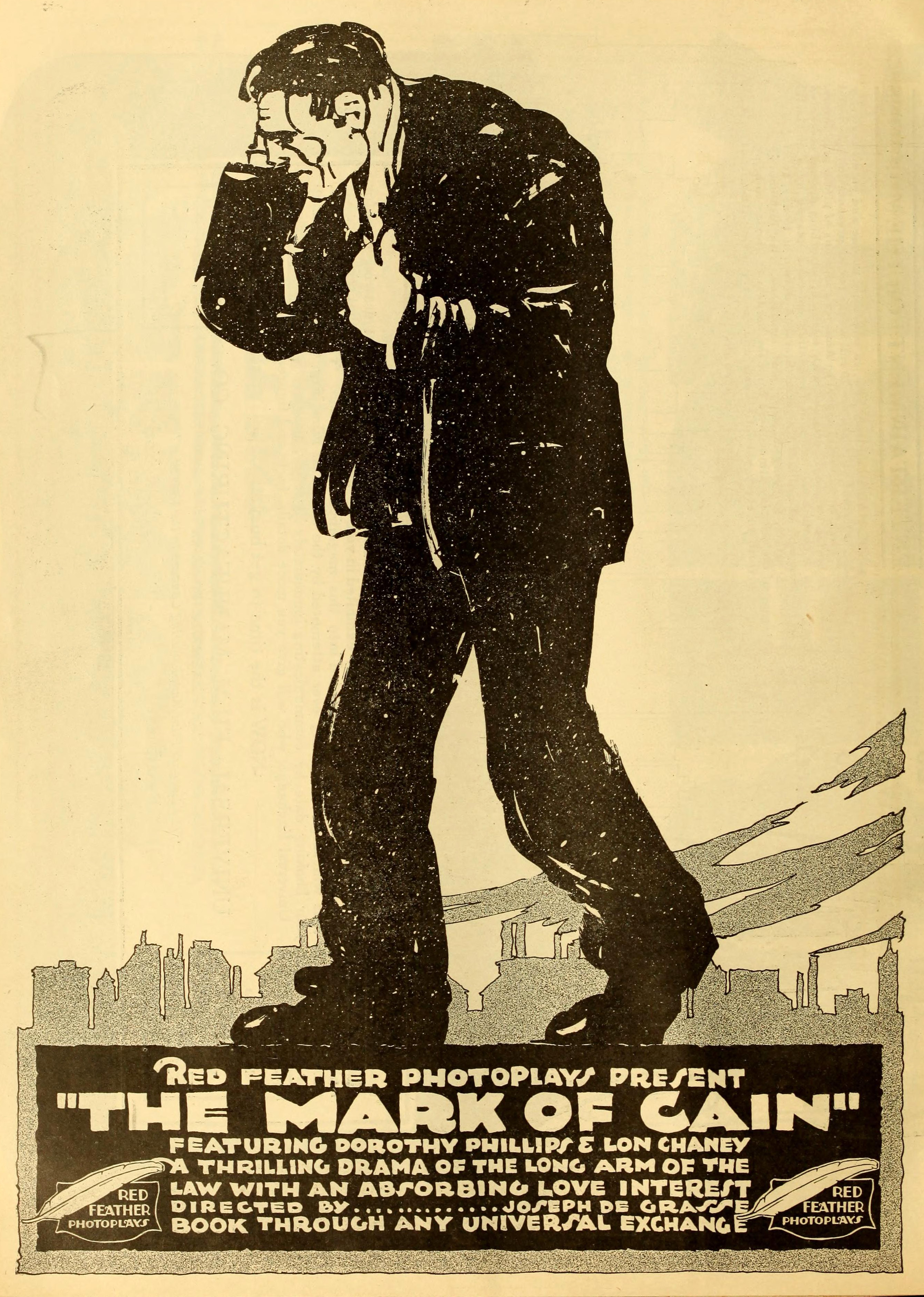
Ad for The Mark of Cain (1916)

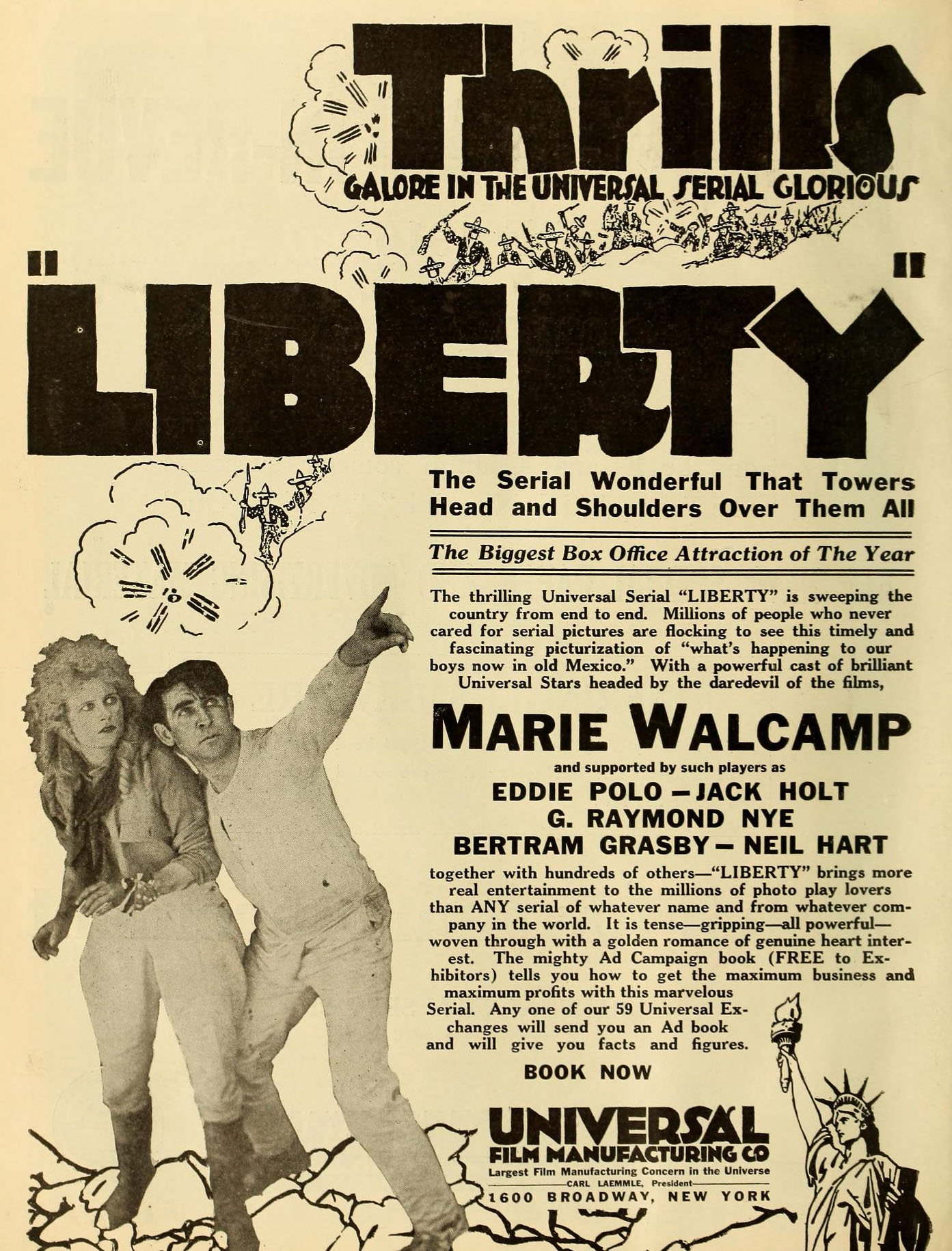
Ad for the serial Liberty (1916)

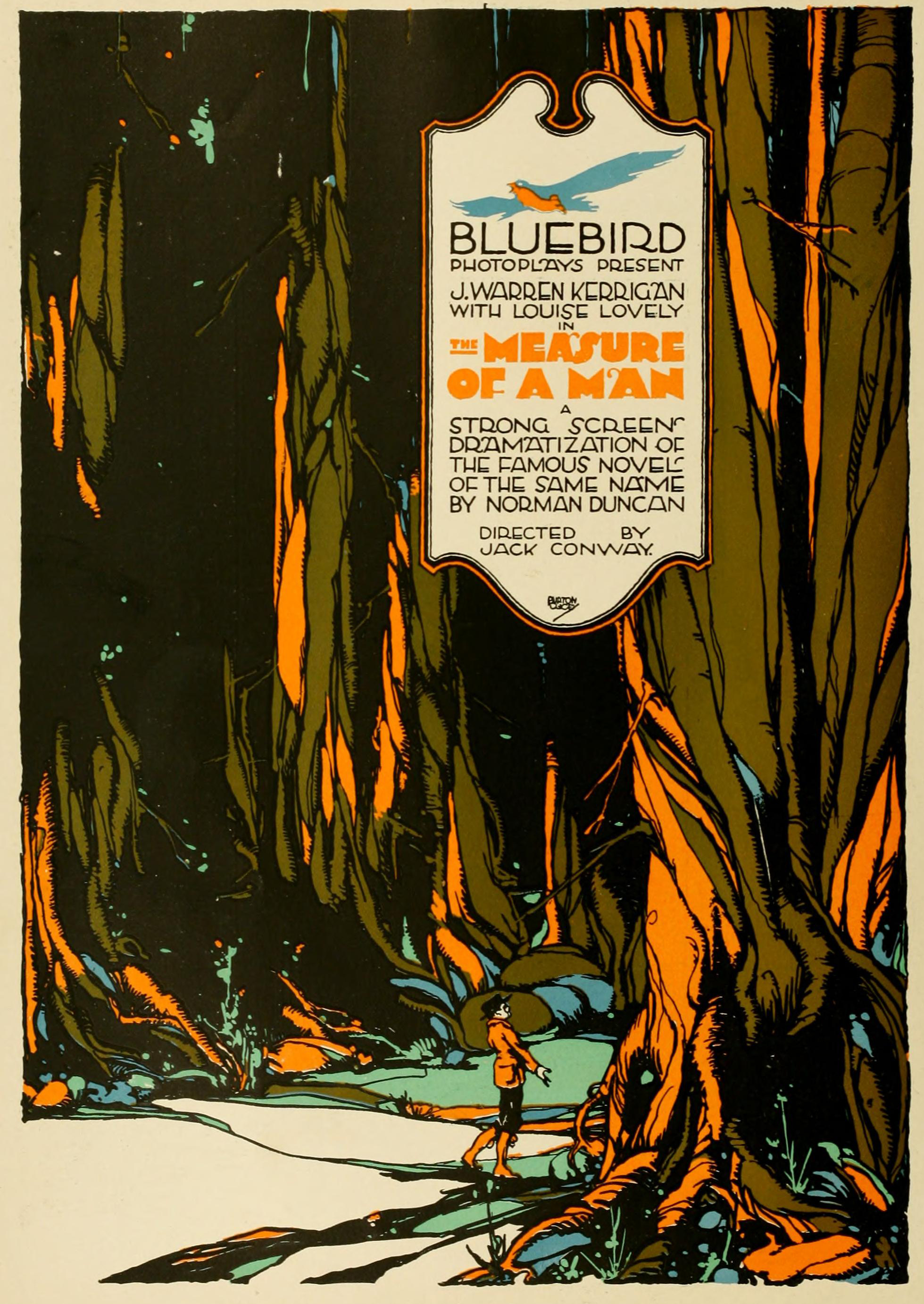
Ad for The Measure of a Man (1916)

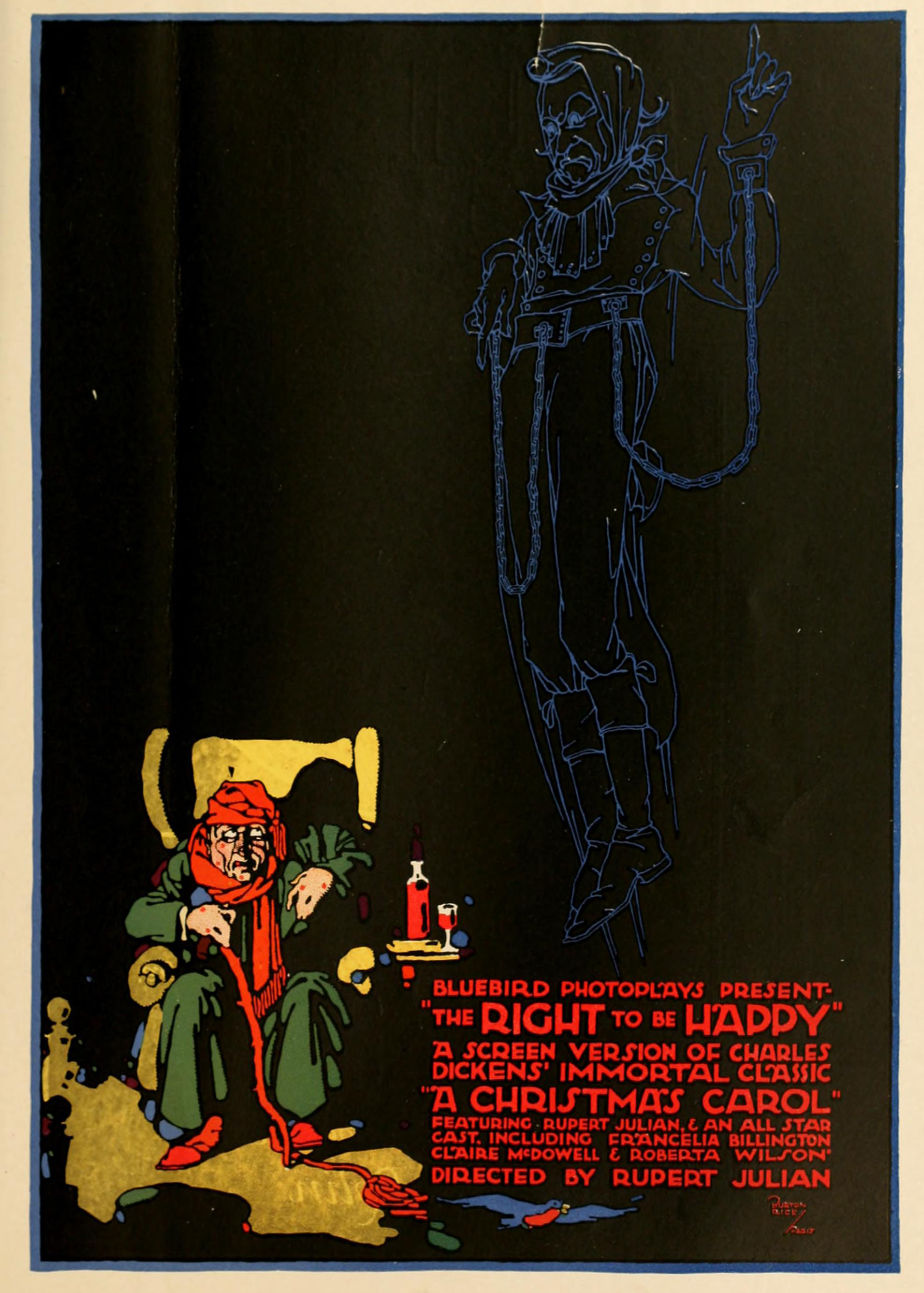
Ad for The Right to Be Happy (1916)

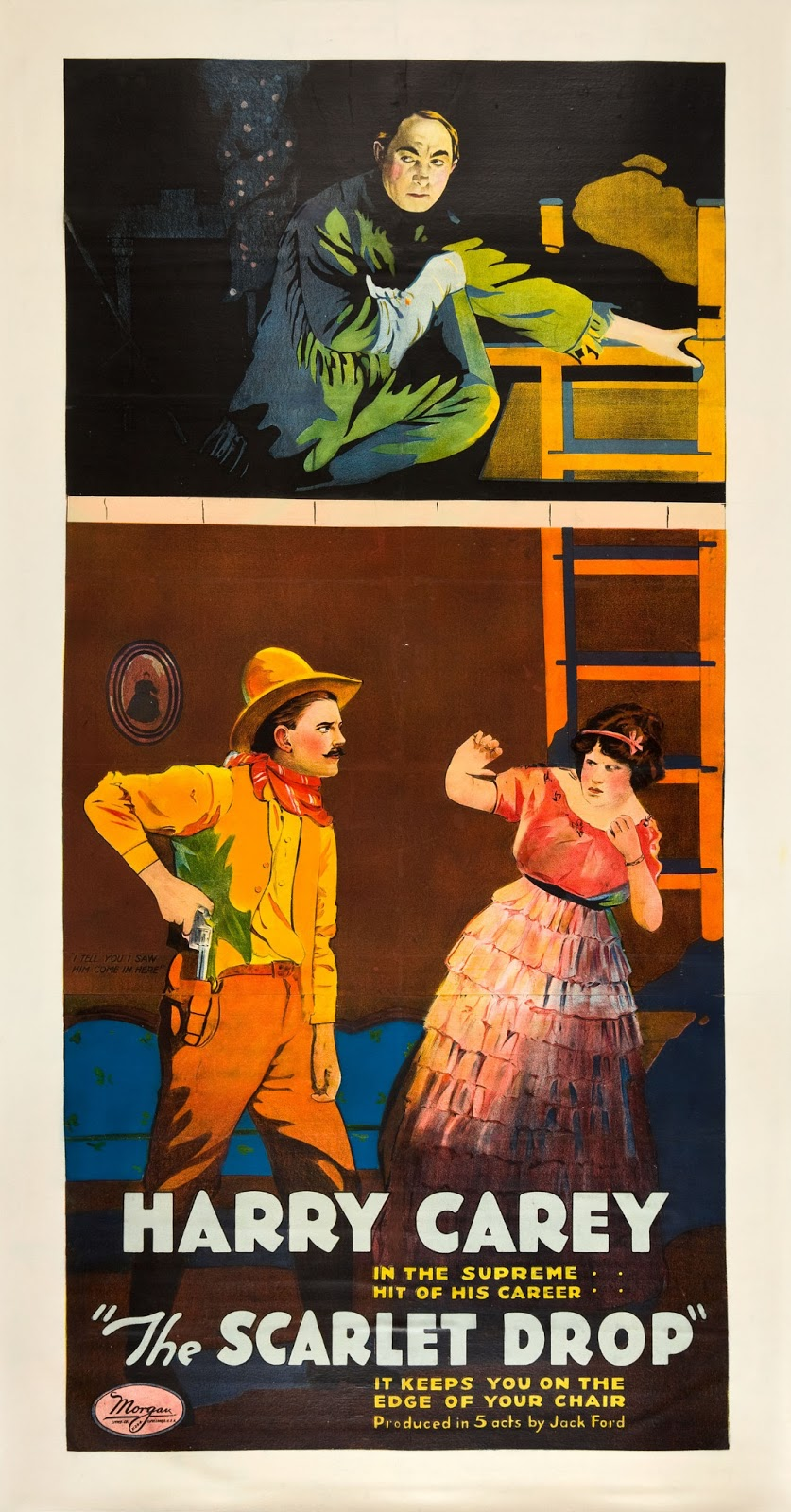
Poster for The Scarlet Drop (1918)

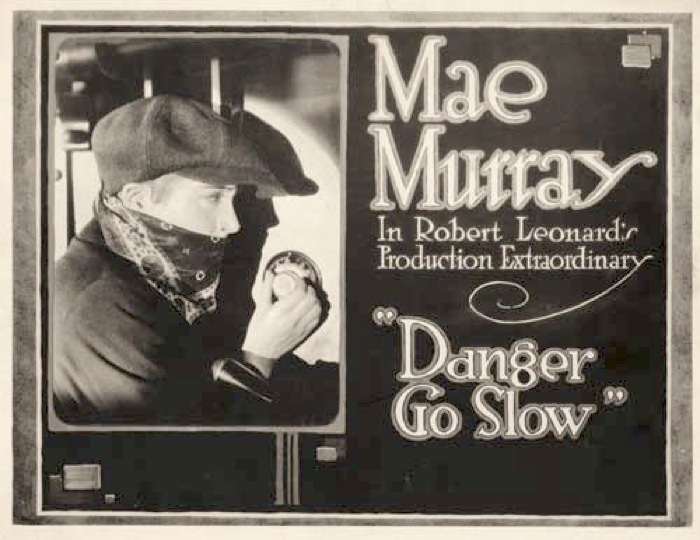
Lobby card for Danger, Go Slow (1918)

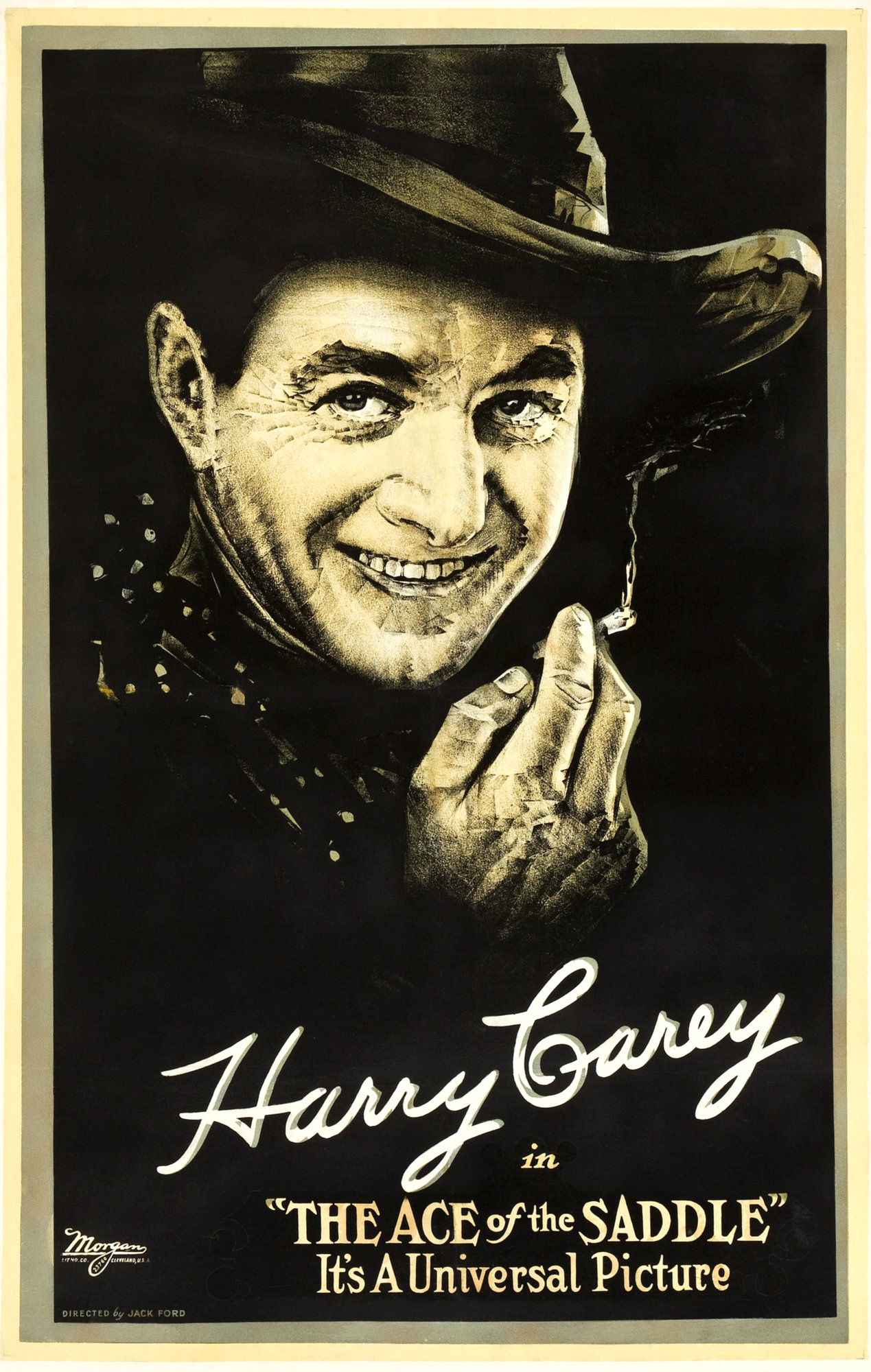
Poster for The Ace of the Saddle (1919)

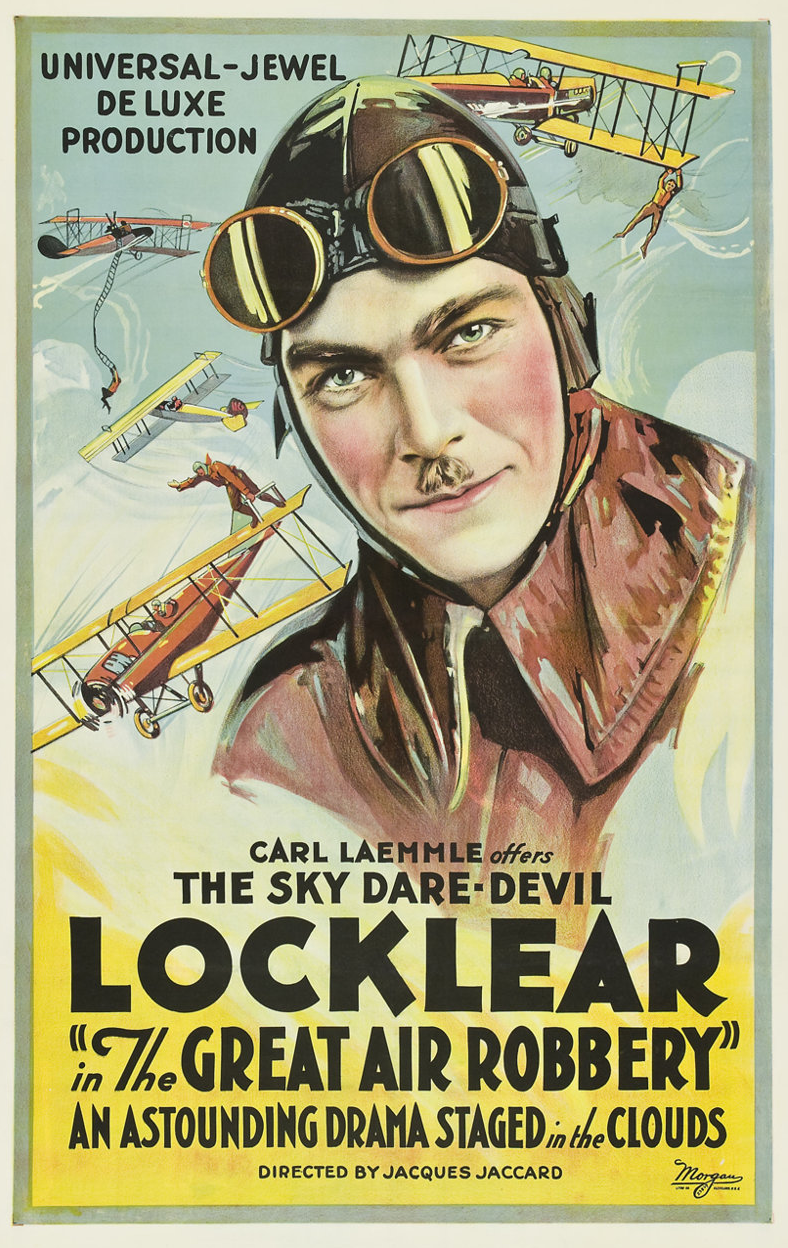
Poster for The Great Air Robbery (1919)

== 1912 ==
| Release date | Title | Notes |
|---|---|---|
| June 24, 1912 | The Dawn of Netta | lost first Universal Film Manufacturing Company movie |
| October 28, 1912 | Sue | lost |
| October 29, 1912 | The Old Doll Maker | lost |
| October 31, 1912 | Careful Nursing | lost |
| October 31, 1912 | The Transgression of Deacon Jones | lost |
| November 3, 1912 | An Old-Fashioned Mother | lost |
| November 7, 1912 | The Honor of the Family | lost |

== 1913 ==
| Release date | Title | Notes |
|---|---|---|
| January 30, 1913 | Gold Is Not All | lost |
| March 6, 1913 | Dr. Jekyll and Mr. Hyde | |
| March 18, 1913 | The Battle of Bull Run | lost |
| August 14, 1913 | Sally Scraggs, Housemaid | lost |
| August 30, 1913 | The Gratitude of Wanda | lost |
| September 22, 1913 | Ivanhoe | |
| October 29, 1913 | The Tramp Dentists | lost |
| November 24, 1913 | Back to Life | lost |
| November 24, 1913 | Traffic in Souls | |
| December 13, 1913 | The Werewolf | lost |

== 1914 ==
| Release date | Title | Notes |
|---|---|---|
| April 9, 1914 | The Ruby Circle | |
| April 14, 1914 | Lucille Love, Girl of Mystery | Film serial. four episodes and some fragments survive |
| April 25, 1914 | Neptune's Daughter | incomplete |
| April 30, 1914 | Samson | lost |
| June 1, 1914 | The Spy | lost |
| August 4, 1914 | The Trey o' Hearts | Film serial. lost |
| September 26, 1914 | Richelieu | lost |
| September 30, 1914 | When Bess Got in Wrong | |
| November 16, 1914 | The Master Key | Film serial, Episode 5 Survives |
| November 17, 1914 | The Opened Shutters | lost |
| November 23, 1914 | Damon and Pythias | |
| November 24, 1914 | The Mysterious Rose | lost co-production with the twilight company |
| December 1, 1914 | Called Back | lost |
| December 4, 1914 | When Lizzie Got Her Polish | |

== 1915 ==
| Release date | Title | Notes |
|---|---|---|
| February 9, 1915 | The Heart of Lincoln | 1922 version rediscovered in 2025. |
| February 20, 1915 | Three Bad Men and a Girl | lost |
| March 1915 | The Phantom of Violin | lost |
| March 14, 1915 | The Black Box | lost Film serial |
| May 21, 1915 | Courtmartialed | lost |
| June 1, 1915 | Under the Crescent | lost |
| June 2, 1915 | The Silent Command | lost |
| June 8, 1915 | The White Terror | lost |
| June 21, 1915 | The Broken Coin | lost |
| June 25, 1915 | Conscience | lost |
| July 2, 1915 | The Marble Heart | lost |
| July 10, 1915 | Scandal | incomplete |
| July 12, 1915 | The Garden of Lies | lost |
| July 26, 1915 | The Earl of Pawtucket | lost |
| July 29, 1915 | Heritage | lost |
| August 2, 1915 | The Scarlet Sin | lost |
| August 9, 1915 | Judy Forgot | lost |
| August 16, 1915 | Just Jim | lost |
| August 23, 1915 | Mrs. Plum's Pudding | |
| August 30, 1915 | Jewel | lost |
| September 4, 1915 | Coral | lost |
| September 6, 1915 | A Little Brother of the Rich | lost |
| September 13, 1915 | Business Is Business | lost |
| September 17, 1915 | The Suburban | lost |
| September 20, 1915 | Under Southern Skies | lost |
| September 27, 1915 | Judge Not; or The Woman of Mona Diggings | lost |
| October 1, 1915 | The Wolf of Debt | lost |
| October 4, 1915 | Fatherhood | |
| October 6, 1915 | The Woman Who Lied | lost |
| October 11, 1915 | The Man of Shame | lost |
| October 18, 1915 | The Campbells are Coming | lost |
| October 25, 1915 | The College Orphan | lost |
| November 1, 1915 | The Long Chance | lost |
| November 8, 1915 | The Frame-Up | lost |
| November 15, 1915 | Colorado | lost |
| November 22, 1915 | My Old Dutch | lost |
| November 29, 1915 | The Supreme Test | lost |
| December 6, 1915 | Tainted Money | lost |
| December 6, 1915 | The White Scar | lost |
| December 11, 1915 | Graft | lost |
| December 13, 1915 | The Primrose Path | |
| December 14, 1915 | Lord John in New York | |
| December 20, 1915 | Father and the Boys | lost |
| December 21, 1915 | Christmas Memories | |

== 1916 ==
| Release date | Title | Notes |
|---|---|---|
| January 1916 | Secret Love | |
| January 3, 1916 | Langdon's Legacy | lost |
| January 10, 1916 | Love's Pilgrimage to America | lost |
| January 17, 1916 | The Man Inside | lost |
| January 24, 1916 | A Soul Enslaved | lost |
| January 31, 1916 | The Path of Happiness | lost |
| February 7, 1916 | A Knight of the Range | lost |
| February 7, 1916 | Undine | lost |
| February 14, 1916 | Hop, the Devil's Brew | lost |
| February 14, 1916 | The Sphinx | lost |
| February 21, 1916 | The Wrong Door | lost |
| February 22, 1916 | The Pipe Dream | |
| February 27, 1916 | Her Greatest Story | |
| February 28, 1916 | The Grip of Jealousy | lost |
| February 28, 1916 | The Lords of High Decision | lost |
| March 6, 1916 | The Target | lost |
| March 12, 1916 | The Strength of the Weak | |
| March 13, 1916 | The Pool of Flame | lost |
| March 17, 1916 | Autumn | lost |
| March 19, 1916 | The Yaqui | lost |
| March 20, 1916 | Drugged Waters | lost |
| March 26, 1916 | The Flirt | lost |
| April 2, 1916 | Tangled Hearts | lost |
| April 3, 1916 | The Dumb Girl of Portici | |
| April 3, 1916 | Two Men of Sandy Bar | lost |
| April 10, 1916 | John Needham's Double | lost |
| April 17, 1916 | The Great Problem | |
| April 17, 1916 | Her Bitter Cup | lost |
| April 24, 1916 | The Gay Lord Waring | lost |
| April 24, 1916 | Thrown to the Lions | lost |
| May 1916 | Where Are My Children? | |
| May 1, 1916 | The Crippled Hand | lost |
| May 1, 1916 | Doctor Neighbor | lost |
| May 1, 1916 | The Adventures of Peg o' the Ring | lost |
| May 8, 1916 | The Gilded Spider | |
| May 8, 1916 | A Huntress of Men | lost |
| May 11, 1916 | Her Husband's Faith | lost |
| May 14, 1916 | A Youth of Fortune | lost |
| May 15, 1916 | Elusive Isabel | lost |
| May 22, 1916 | A Son of the Immortals | incomplete co-production with the twilight company |
| May 22, 1916 | Half a Rogue | |
| May 29, 1916 | The Iron Hand | Incomplete; (Reels 2 & 5 Of 5) |
| May 29, 1916 | Naked Hearts | lost |
| June 5, 1916 | The Eye of God | lost |
| June 5, 1916 | The Madcap | Incomplete (Reels 2 & 5 Of 5) |
| June 12, 1916 | Bobbie of the Ballet | lost |
| June 12, 1916 | What Love Can Do | lost |
| June 19, 1916 | The Man from Nowhere | lost |
| June 19, 1916 | The Three Godfathers | lost |
| June 26, 1916 | It Happened in Honolulu | lost |
| June 26, 1916 | Shoes | |
| July 3, 1916 | Broken Fetters | lost |
| July 3, 1916 | The Way of the World | lost |
| July 10, 1916 | The Love Girl | |
| July 17, 1916 | The Grasp of Greed | |
| July 17, 1916 | The Seekers | incomplete; |
| July 24, 1916 | The Silent Battle | lost |
| July 24, 1916 | Temptation and the Man | lost |
| July 26, 1916 | Cross Purposes | |
| July 31, 1916 | From Broadway to a Throne | incomplete (final reel missing) |
| July 31, 1916 | The Secret of the Swamp | lost |
| August 7, 1916 | Love's Lariat | |
| August 7, 1916 | The Mark of Cain | lost |
| August 14, 1916 | Bettina Loved a Soldier | lost |
| August 14, 1916 | A Yoke of Gold | lost |
| August 20, 1916 | Liberty | lost |
| August 21, 1916 | The Beckoning Trail | lost |
| August 21, 1916 | Little Eve Edgarton | |
| August 28, 1916 | The Girl of Lost Lake | lost |
| September 3, 1916 | The Narrow Path | lost |
| September 3, 1916 | Is Any Girl Safe? | lost |
| September 4, 1916 | The Unattainable | incomplete |
| September 10, 1916 | The Whirlpool of Destiny | Incomplete; (Reel 1 Of 5) |
| September 11, 1916 | Saving the Family Name | incomplete (Reels 3? & 5 Of 5) |
| September 18, 1916 | Black Friday | lost |
| September 18, 1916 | Behind the Lines | Incomplete; (Reel 2 Of 5) |
| September 25, 1916 | If My Country Should Call | incomplete;(Reels 2,3 & 5 Of 5) |
| September 26, 1916 | The Evil Women Do | lost |
| September 1916 | Idle Wives | incomplete |
| October 2, 1916 | Wanted: A Home | lost |
| October 9, 1916 | The Chalice of Sorrow | |
| October 9, 1916 | A Romance of Billy Goat Hill | incomplete; (Reels 4 & 5 Of 5) |
| October 16, 1916 | Barriers of Society | incomplete (Reel 1 Of 5) |
| October 16, 1916 | The Social Buccaneer | Incomplete (Reels 1-3 Of 5) |
| October 22, 1916 | The Red Ace | incomplete |
| October 23, 1916 | The Black Sheep of the Family | lost |
| October 23, 1916 | Love Never Dies | lost |
| October 30, 1916 | The End of the Rainbow | Incomplete (Reel 2? Of 5) |
| October 30, 1916 | The Isle of Life | |
| November 6, 1916 | Gloriana | |
| November 6, 1916 | The Place Beyond the Winds | incomplete; one reel missing |
| November 13, 1916 | The Heritage of Hate | lost |
| November 13, 1916 | The Stranger from Somewhere | |
| November 20, 1916 | The Devil's Bondwoman | lost |
| November 20, 1916 | The Measure of a Man | lost |
| November 27, 1916 | The Bugler of Algiers | lost |
| November 27, 1916 | The Mainspring | lost |
| December 4, 1916 | The Eagle's Wings | |
| December 4, 1916 | Kinkaid, Gambler | lost |
| December 4, 1916 | The Sign of the Poppy | lost |
| December 10, 1916 | The People vs. John Doe | lost |
| December 11, 1916 | The Morals of Hilda | lost |
| December 11, 1916 | The Price of Silence | |
| December 18, 1916 | The Honor of Mary Blake | lost |
| December 18, 1916 | Mixed Blood | lost |
| December 24, 1916 | 20,000 Leagues Under the Sea | |
| December 25, 1916 | The Right to Be Happy | lost co-production with the twilight company |
| December 25, 1916 | A Child of Mystery | lost |

== 1917 ==
| Release date | Title | Notes |
|---|---|---|
| January 1, 1917 | Black Orchids | lost co-production with the twilight company |
| January 1, 1917 | Polly Put the Kettle On | lost |
| January 2, 1917 | Cannibals and Carnivals | Short. |
| January 8, 1917 | Fighting for Love | lost |
| January 8, 1917 | The Piper's Price | lost |
| January 15, 1917 | The Double Room Mystery | lost |
| January 15, 1917 | Her Soul's Inspiration | Incomplete (Reels 2-5 Of 5) |
| January 22, 1917 | God's Crucible | lost |
| January 22, 1917 | Heart Strings | lost |
| January 29, 1917 | The Devil's Pay Day | lost |
| January 29, 1917 | Love Aflame | Incomplete (Reels 4 & 5 Of 5) |
| February 5, 1917 | The Mysterious Mrs. M | incomplete. reels 3, 4 and 5 are lost co- production with the twilight company |
| February 12, 1917 | The Reward of the Faithless | fragment |
| February 12, 1917 | The Terror | lost |
| February 19, 1917 | The Man Who Took a Chance | lost |
| February 19, 1917 | The War of the Tongs | lost |
| February 26, 1917 | The Girl and the Crisis | lost |
| February 26, 1917 | The Saintly Sinner | lost |
| March 5, 1917 | The Boy Girl | Incomplete (Reel 3 Of 5) |
| March 5, 1917 | The Gates of Doom | lost |
| March 5, 1917 | Hell Morgan's Girl | lost |
| March 12, 1917 | Mutiny | lost |
| March 18, 1917 | The Voice on the Wire | lost |
| March 19, 1917 | Polly Redhead | |
| March 19, 1917 | The Scarlet Crystal | lost |
| March 26, 1917 | The Fighting Gringo | lost |
| March 26, 1917 | The Gift Girl | |
| April 1, 1917 | Even As You and I | lost |
| April 2, 1917 | Susan's Gentleman | lost |
| April 2, 1917 | The Bronze Bride | lost |
| April 9, 1917 | Mr. Dolan of New York | Incomplete (Reel 3 Of 5) |
| April 9, 1917 | The Pulse of Life | lost |
| April 16, 1917 | The Flower of Doom | |
| April 16, 1917 | A Jewel in Pawn | lost |
| April 23, 1917 | The Girl in the Checkered Coat | lost |
| April 23, 1917 | The Hero of the Hour | lost co-production with the twilight company |
| April 30, 1917 | The Birth of Patriotism | lost |
| April 30, 1917 | The Clock | lost |
| May 7, 1917 | Eternal Love | lost |
| May 7, 1917 | Little Miss Nobody | lost |
| May 13, 1917 | The Hand That Rocks the Cradle | lost |
| May 14, 1917 | The Phantom's Secret | lost |
| May 14, 1917 | Treason | lost |
| May 21, 1917 | The Flashlight | lost |
| May 21, 1917 | Like Wildfire | lost |
| May 28, 1917 | Southern Justice | lost |
| May 28, 1917 | Money Madness | lost |
| June 4, 1917 | Bringing Home Father | lost |
| June 4, 1917 | The Circus of Life | |
| June 11, 1917 | A Doll's House | lost |
| June 11, 1917 | The Field of Honor | |
| June 16, 1917 | The Flame of Youth | lost |
| June 17, 1917 | Come Through | lost |
| June 18, 1917 | The Little Orphan | Incomplete (Reels 2, 4 & 5 Of 5) |
| June 23, 1917 | Man and Beast | |
| June 25, 1917 | A Kentucky Cinderella | incomplete |
| June 30, 1917 | The Gray Ghost | lost co-production with the twilight company |
| July 2, 1917 | Fires of Rebellion | lost |
| July 2, 1917 | The Plow Woman | lost |
| July 9, 1917 | The Car of Chance | lost |
| July 9, 1917 | The Reed Case | lost |
| July 16, 1917 | High Speed | lost |
| July 16, 1917 | The Greater Law | lost |
| July 26, 1977 | Follow the Girl | lost |
| July 30, 1917 | A Wife on Trial | lost |
| July 30, 1917 | The Rescue | lost |
| August 6, 1917 | The Clean-Up | |
| August 13, 1917 | The Show Down | lost |
| August 13, 1917 | The Midnight Man | lost |
| August 20, 1917 | The Lair of the Wolf | lost |
| August 20, 1917 | Mr. Opp | lost |
| August 27, 1917 | The Charmer | lost |
| August 27, 1917 | Straight Shooting | |
| September 1, 1917 | Pay Me! | incomplete |
| September 2, 1917 | Mother O' Mine | lost |
| September 3, 1917 | Triumph | incomplete (3 reels of 5) |
| September 3, 1917 | Who Was the Other Man? | lost |
| September 9, 1917 | The Man Without a Country | |
| September 10, 1917 | The Little Pirate | lost |
| September 10, 1917 | A Stormy Knight | lost |
| September 17, 1917 | The Mysterious Mr. Tiller | lost |
| September 17, 1917 | The Spindle of Life | lost |
| September 18, 1917 | Flirting with Death | lost |
| September 20, 1917 | Sirens of the Sea | lost |
| September 23, 1917 | The Double Standard | lost |
| September 24, 1917 | The Edge of the Law | lost |
| October 1, 1917 | The Secret Man | incomplete (Reels 2? & 4? Of 5) |
| October 1, 1917 | The Spotted Lily | incomplete |
| October 8, 1917 | Anything Once | lost |
| October 8, 1917 | The Girl Who Won Out | lost |
| October 14, 1917 | The Co-Respondent | incomplete (Reel 2? Of 6) |
| October 15, 1917 | '49–'17 | |
| October 17, 1917 | Bondage | lost |
| October 19, 1917 | A Marked Man | lost |
| October 22, 1916 | The Desire of the Moth | lost |
| October 22, 1916 | Society's Driftwood | lost |
| October 28, 1917 | Princess Virtue | Incomplete (Reels 1-2, 5 & 6? Of 6?) |
| October 29, 1917 | The Man Trap | lost |
| November 4, 1917 | The Price of a Good Time | lost |
| November 5, 1917 | John Ermine of the Yellowstone | lost |
| November 5, 1917 | The Lash of Power | lost |
| November 12, 1917 | The Cricket | |
| November 18, 1917 | Fighting Mad | lost |
| November 19, 1917 | The Man from Montana | lost |
| November 19, 1917 | The Savage | lost |
| November 26, 1917 | Fear Not | lost |
| November 26, 1917 | The Winged Mystery | lost |
| December 1, 1917 | The Mystery Ship | lost |
| December 3, 1917 | The Raggedy Queen | incomplete; one reel missing |
| December 10, 1917 | The Silent Lady | lost |
| December 13, 1917 | Bull's Eye | lost |
| December 16, 1917 | The Girl by the Roadside | lost |
| December 16, 1917 | The High Sign | lost |
| December 17, 1917 | My Little Boy | lost |
| December 18, 1917 | The Door Between | lost |
| December 24, 1917 | The Scarlet Car | |

== 1918 ==
| Release date | Title | Notes |
|---|---|---|
| January 5, 1918 | Ambrose's Icy Love | Short. |
| January 7, 1918 | My Unmarried Wife | |
| January 7, 1918 | The Wolf and His Mate | lost |
| January 14, 1918 | Hell's Crater | lost |
| January 19, 1918 | Face Value | |
| January 21, 1918 | Broadway Love | |
| January 21, 1918 | Madame Spy | lost |
| January 28, 1918 | The Fighting Grin | |
| January 28, 1918 | The Phantom Riders | lost |
| January 1918 | The Grand Passion | lost |
| February 4, 1918 | Painted Lips | lost |
| February 4, 1918 | The Wife He Bought | lost |
| February 11, 1918 | Hands Down | lost |
| February 11, 1918 | New Love for Old | incomplete (reels 1 & 2 of 5) |
| February 18, 1918 | The Flash of Fate | lost |
| February 18, 1918 | Morgan's Raiders | lost |
| February 21, 1918 | The Rough Lover | lost |
| February 25, 1918 | Wild Women | lost co-production with the twilight company |
| March 4, 1918 | The Girl in the Dark | lost |
| March 4, 1918 | Nobody's Wife | lost |
| March 11, 1918 | Beauty in Chains | lost |
| March 11, 1918 | Hungry Eyes | lost |
| March 13, 1918 | The Girl Who Wouldn't Quit | lost |
| March 18, 1918 | Brace Up | lost |
| March 18, 1918 | Thieves' Gold | lost |
| March 19, 1918 | The Kaiser, the Beast of Berlin | lost |
| March 25, 1918 | The Wine Girl | lost |
| April 1, 1918 | Fast Company | lost |
| April 1, 1918 | The Magic Eye | lost |
| April 6, 1918 | The Lion's Claws | lost serial |
| April 8, 1918 | The Red, Red Heart | lost |
| April 14, 1918 | The Doctor and the Woman | lost |
| April 18, 1918 | A Rich Man's Darling | lost |
| April 22, 1918 | The Scarlet Drop | incomplete |
| April 25, 1918 | The Risky Road | |
| April 27, 1918 | The Marriage Lie | Incomplete (Reel 2 Of 5) |
| April 29, 1918 | A Mother's Secret | lost |
| May 5, 1918 | The Bride's Awakening | |
| May 6, 1918 | The Two-Soul Woman | lost |
| May 11, 1918 | Danger Within | lost |
| May 13, 1918 | The Guilt of Silence | lost |
| May 19, 1918 | A Soul for Sale | Incomplete (Reels 1 & 5 Of 6) |
| May 25, 1918 | $5,000 Reward | lost co-production with the twilight company |
| June 1, 1918 | A Broadway Scandal | lost |
| June 2, 1918 | The Model's Confession | lost |
| June 8, 1918 | Midnight Madness | lost |
| June 9, 1918 | Kiss or Kill | lost |
| June 10, 1918 | Which Woman? | lost |
| June 16, 1918 | Her Body in Bond | lost |
| June 22, 1918 | The Eagle | lost |
| June 29, 1918 | The City of Tears | lost |
| July 1, 1918 | After the War | lost |
| July 6, 1918 | The Empty Cab | |
| July 6, 1918 | Hell Bent | |
| July 20, 1918 | Winner Takes All | lost |
| July 22, 1918 | The Deciding Kiss | |
| July 29, 1918 | The Dream Lady | |
| August 3, 1918 | The Mortgaged Wife | lost |
| August 5, 1918 | The Love Swindle | |
| August 10, 1918 | The Brass Bullet | lost |
| August 12, 1918 | Playthings | lost |
| August 12, 1918 | Give Her Gas | |
| August 17, 1918 | A Woman's Fool | lost |
| August 26, 1918 | Fires of Youth | lost |
| September 1, 1918 | For Husbands Only | lost |
| September 1, 1918 | Bread | Incomplete (Reels 3 &4 Of 6) |
| September 2, 1918 | That Devil, Bateese | lost |
| September 9, 1918 | The Brazen Beauty | lost |
| September 14, 1918 | Modern Love | lost |
| September 16, 1918 | Beans | lost |
| September 22, 1918 | The Craving | |
| September 23, 1918 | A Society Sensation | incomplete |
| September 28, 1918 | The Talk of the Town | lost |
| September 30, 1918 | The Velvet Hand | lost |
| October 7, 1918 | The Lure of Luxury | lost |
| October 7, 1918 | Three Mounted Men | lost |
| October 14, 1918 | Together | lost |
| November 4, 1918 | Borrowed Clothes | lost |
| November 13, 1918 | The Yellow Dog | lost |
| November 18, 1918 | Lure of the Circus | co-production with the twilight company |
| November 23, 1918 | Hugon, The Mighty | lost |
| November 30, 1918 | All Night | |
| December 2, 1918 | Tongues of Flame | lost |
| December 7, 1918 | The Vanity Pool | lost |
| December 9, 1918 | Set Free | lost |
| December 15, 1918 | The Wildcat of Paris | lost |
| December 16, 1918 | Danger, Go Slow | lost |
| December 16, 1918 | She Hired a Husband | lost |
| December 23, 1918 | The Sea Flower | |
| 1918 | The Yanks Are Coming | Documentary. lost |

== 1919 ==
| Release date | Title | Notes |
|---|---|---|
| January 6, 1919 | The Nature Girl | lost |
| January 13, 1919 | Roped | lost |
| January 20, 1919 | The Game's Up | lost |
| January 27, 1919 | Who Will Marry Me? | lost |
| February 3, 1919 | Sue of the South | |
| February 10, 1919 | Creaking Stairs | |
| February 10, 1919 | The Millionaire Pirate | lost |
| February 15, 1919 | The Heart of Humanity | Co-owned by Gaumont, Orange S.A. and StudioCanal |
| February 15, 1919 | When a Girl Loves | lost |
| February 17, 1919 | The Sealed Envelope | lost |
| February 24, 1919 | The Little White Savage | |
| February 24, 1919 | The Wicked Darling | |
| March 2, 1919 | A Taste of Life | lost |
| March 10, 1919 | The Scarlet Shadow | lost |
| March 17, 1919 | The Light of Victory | lost |
| March 17, 1919 | The Red Glove | lost |
| March 24, 1919 | A Fight for Love | lost |
| March 31, 1919 | The Silk-Lined Burglar | Incomplete (reels 3-6 of 6) |
| April 7, 1919 | The Amazing Wife | lost co-production with the twilight company |
| April 14, 1919 | What Am I Bid? | lost |
| April 21, 1919 | The Fire Flingers | |
| April 28, 1919 | The Exquisite Thief | Incomplete (Reel 2? Of 6) |
| May 1919 | The Big Little Person | lost |
| May 5, 1919 | Bare Fists | lost |
| May 19, 1919 | The Blinding Trail | lost |
| May 20, 1919 | The Delicious Little Devil | |
| May 26, 1919 | The Unpainted Woman | lost |
| June 1, 1919 | Destiny | lost |
| June 9, 1919 | Riders of Vengeance | lost |
| June 16, 1919 | Pretty Smooth | lost |
| June 23, 1919 | The Sleeping Lion | lost |
| June 30, 1919 | The Weaker Vessel | lost |
| July 7, 1919 | The Outcasts of Poker Flat | lost |
| July 7, 1919 | A Little Brother of the Rich | lost |
| July 21, 1919 | The Spitfire of Seville | lost |
| July 28, 1919 | The Man in the Moonlight | |
| August 3, 1919 | A Petal on the Current | lost |
| August 11, 1919 | The Trap | lost |
| August 18, 1919 | The Ace of the Saddle | lost |
| August 30, 1919 | The Right to Happiness | |
| August 31, 1919 | Home | lost |
| August 31, 1919 | The Sundown Trail | lost |
| September 1, 1919 | The Midnight Man | lost |
| September 8, 1919 | Forbidden | lost |
| September 15, 1919 | The Woman Under Cover | lost |
| September 29, 1919 | The Lion Man | lost |
| October 5, 1919 | Bonnie Bonnie Lassie | lost |
| October 6, 1919 | Loot | lost |
| October 13, 1919 | The Great Radium Mystery | lost |
| October 18, 1919 | Common Property | lost |
| October 20, 1919 | The Brute Breaker | lost |
| October 26, 1919 | His Divorced Wife | lost |
| November 1, 1919 | The Trembling Hour | lost |
| November 3, 1919 | The Rider of the Law | lost |
| November 23, 1919 | Under Suspicion | lost |
| November 29, 1919 | A Gun Fightin' Gentleman | incomplete |
| November 30, 1919 | Paid in Advance | |
| December 1, 1919 | The Pointing Finger | lost |
| December 7, 1919 | Blind Husbands | |
| December 8, 1919 | Lasca | |
| December 21, 1919 | The Day She Paid | lost |
| December 21, 1919 | Marked Men | lost |
| December 28, 1919 | The Great Air Robbery | lost co-production with the twilight company |

== See also ==
- List of Universal Pictures films (1920–1929)
- List of Focus Features films
- List of Universal Pictures theatrical animated feature films
- Universal Pictures
- Category:Lists of films by studio
