= Alfred Allen (actor) =

American actor (1866–1947)

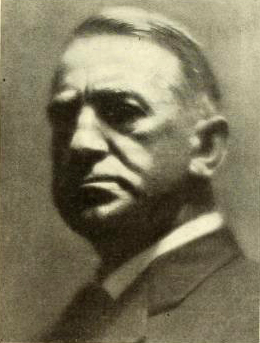
- Moving Picture World, 1919
- Born: April 8, 1866; Alfred, New York
- Died: June 17, 1947 (aged 81); Los Angeles, California
- Occupations: Film actor, author
- Years active: 1913–1935

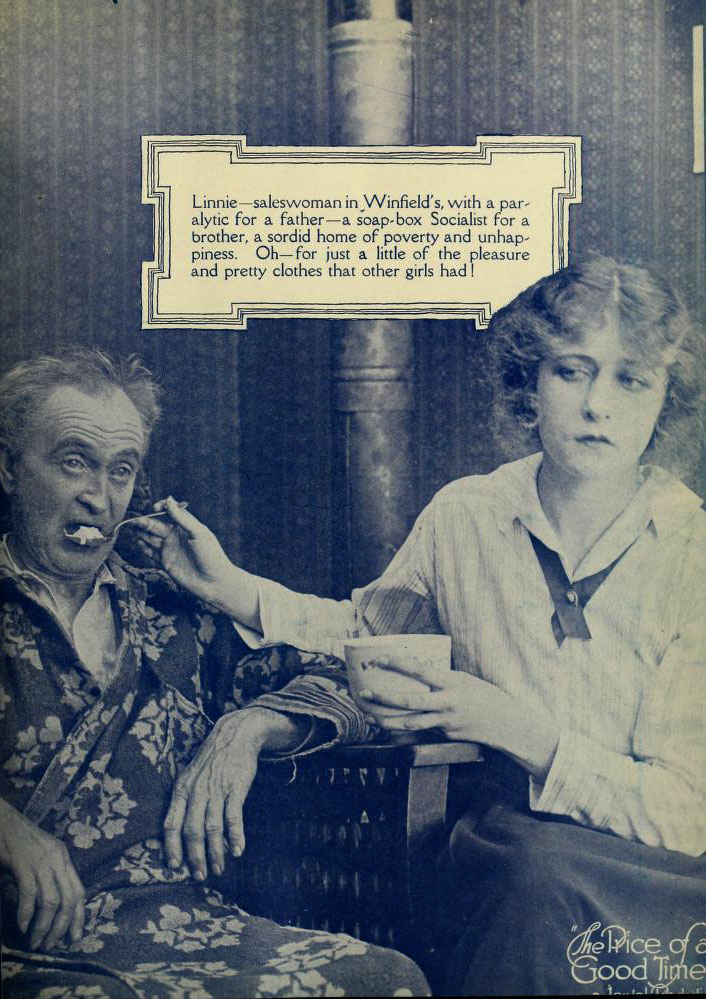
Alfred Allen with Mildred Harris in The Price of a Good Time (1917)

Alfred Allen (April 8, 1866 – June 18, 1947) was an American silent film actor and author.

== Early life ==
Allen was born in Alfred, New York. His parents were Jonathan Macomber Allen (1823–1892), president of Alfred University, and Abigail Ann (Maxson) Allen (1824–1894). Alfred's siblings were William (b. 1853), Eva (b. 1856), and May (b. 1860).

He attended Harvard University, Johns Hopkins University, Columbia University, the American Academy of Dramatic Arts and the New England Conservatory of Music and earned his bachelor's and master's degrees at Alfred University.

== Film ==
Allen was signed in 1915 and starred in 106 films before his retirement in 1935. (The reference book A Biographical Dictionary of Silent Film Western Actors and Actresses says, "He entered pictures at Universal City in 1913" and adds that he "appeared in 69 features from 1916 through 1929.")

== Other professional activities ==
After his retirement from film, Allen became a writer and published several books.

== Partial filmography ==
- Heartaches (1916)
- A Yoke of Gold (1916)
- The Unattainable (1916)
- The Human Gamble (1916)
- Barriers of Society (1916)
- Hell Morgan's Girl (1917)
- The Flashlight (1917)
- The Reed Case (1917)
- The Gates of Doom (1917)
- The Flame of Youth (1917)
- Fighting Mad (1917)
- The Price of a Good Time (1917)
- The Grand Passion (1918)
- Nobody's Wife (1918)
- The Kaiser, the Beast of Berlin (1918)
- The Lion's Claws (1918)
- Painted Lips (1918)
- Kiss or Kill (1918)
- The Guilt of Silence (1918)
- The Eagle (1918)
- The Sea Flower (1918)
- Brace Up (1918)
- Winner Takes All (1918)
- Danger, Go Slow (1918)
- The Red Glove (1919)
- Riders of Vengeance (1919)
- The Sleeping Lion (1919)
- The Man in the Moonlight (1919)
- The Other Half (1919)
- Burning Daylight (1920)
- An Old Fashioned Boy (1920)
- The Broken Gate (1920)
- Blackmail (1920)
- The New Disciple (1921)
- The Sage Hen (1921)
- Shattered Idols (1922)
- The Pride of Palomar (1922)
- Colleen of the Pines (1922)
- The Grub-Stake (1923)
- Dead Game (1923)
- Shootin' for Love (1923)
- A Noise in Newboro (1923)
- Desert Driven (1923)
- A Gentleman of Leisure (1923)
- The Miracle Baby (1923)
- The Ghost City (1923)
- White Tiger (1923)
- The Dramatic Life of Abraham Lincoln (1924)
- Stolen Secrets (1924)
- Dangerous Innocence (1925)
- Perils of the Wild (1925)
- Bustin' Thru (1925)
- Speed (1925)
- The Mystery Club (1926)
- Rolling Home (1926)
- Singed (1927)
- The Magic Garden (1927)
- Underworld (1927)
- Out All Night (1927)
- Under the Tonto Rim (1928)
- The Fifty-Fifty Girl (1928)
- Hot News (1928)
- Anybody Here Seen Kelly? (1928)
- The Flying Fleet (1929) (uncredited)
- Sunset Pass (1929)
- New Adventures of Get Rich Quick Wallingford (1931)
