= Rupert Julian =

New Zealand filmmaker (1879–1943)

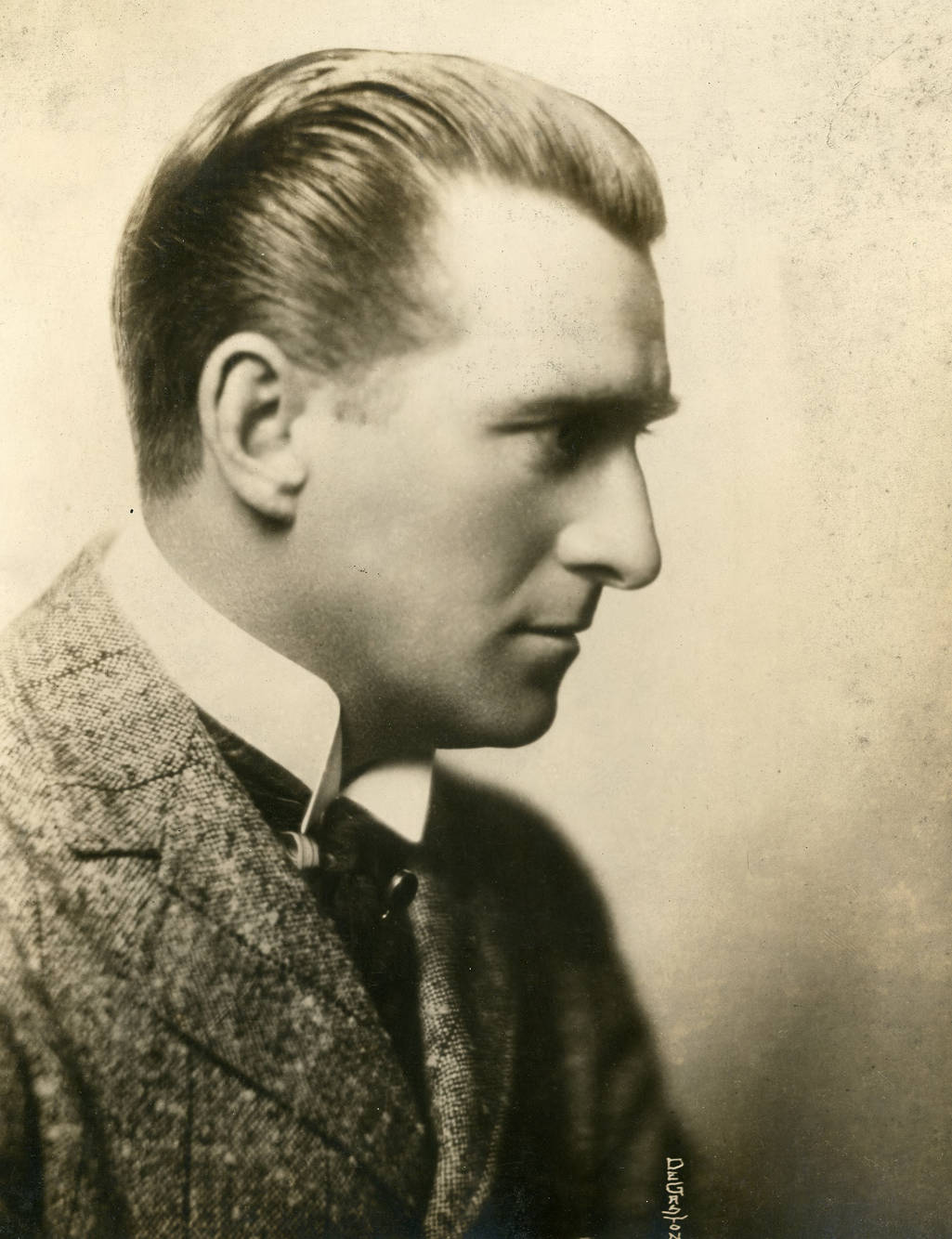
- Julian in 1923
- Born: Thomas Percival Hayes; 25 January 1879; Whangaroa, New Zealand
- Died: 27 December 1943 (aged 64); Hollywood, California, U.S.
- Resting place: Forest Lawn Memorial Park, Glendale, California
- Occupations: Film Director; Writer; Producer; Actor
- Years active: 1913–1930
- Notable work: The Phantom of the Opera; The Kaiser, the Beast of Berlin; The Cat Creeps
- Spouse: Elsie Jane Wilson (m. 1906)
- Parent(s): John Daly Hayes Jr. Eliza Harriet Hayes

Rupert Julian (born Thomas Percival Hayes; 25 January 1879 – 27 December 1943) was a New Zealand cinema actor, director, writer and producer. During his career, Julian directed 60 films and acted in over 90 films. He is best remembered for directing Lon Chaney in The Phantom of the Opera (1925). He also directed The Cat Creeps (1930), a sound remake of The Cat and the Canary (1927), which is now considered a lost film, with only two minutes of footage remaining in the 1932 Universal comedy short film Boo!.

== Early years ==
Julian was born Thomas Percival Hayes in Whangaroa, New Zealand, son of John Daly Hayes (Jr) and Eliza Harriet Hayes. His father was a rancher who raised cattle and sheep.

Julian's parents had him educated in preparation for becoming a Roman Catholic priest, but he went his own way. He volunteered to serve in the British army during the Boer War, and during his two years' service he was captured twice. The first time, he was exchanged, and the second time he escaped. By the time he left the military he was a lieutenant. He also worked as a sailor, a tea salesman, and engineer of a donkey engine.

== Career ==
Julian became an actor when he was 16. He performed on stage in his native country and Australia before emigrating to the United States in 1911, where he started his career as an actor at the Daly Theatre in New York and touring with Tyrone Power, Sr., and then worked in silent movies. He turned to directing in 1914, often directing his wife Elsie Jane Wilson (also a director), and earned a substantial sum for his film The Kaiser, the Beast of Berlin, which he wrote, produced, directed, and starred in the title role. This made him a star in Hollywood at the time and opened doors to larger projects with Universal Studios.

He was assigned to complete Merry-Go-Round in 1923 when director Erich von Stroheim was fired from it. In 1924, he directed Lon Chaney in The Phantom of the Opera, but left the production shortly before it was released. The studio hired another director to complete the filming and changed the ending. Julian moved to Cecil B. DeMille's Producers Distributing Corporation for a series of films, but after directing The Cat Creeps and Love Comes Along (both in 1930), his career faded.

== Death ==
On 27 December 1943, Julian died at his home in Hollywood, California, at the age of 64. He was interred in the Forest Lawn Memorial Park Cemetery in Glendale, California, in 1943. His wife Elsie died in 1965.

== Filmography ==
◆ Filmography of Rupert Julian ◆
Year	Film	Actor	Director	Wife	Writer	Production	Distribution	Genre	Length	Released	Notes
1913	The Wife's Deceit					Rex Prod	Universal	Comedy	Short	1913-12-21	
1913	The Mask					Rex Prod	Universal	Drama	Short	1913-12-14	
1913	The Blood Brotherhood					Rex Prod	Universal	Drama	Short	1913-11-16	
1913	The Haunted Bride					Rex Prod	Universal	Comedy	Short	1913-11-09	
1913	Two Thieves and a Cross					Rex Prod	Universal	Drama	Short	1913-11-04	
1913	The Clue					Rex Prod	Universal	Drama	Short	1913-10-30	
1913	Memories					Rex Prod	Universal	Drama	Short	1913-10-16	
1913	Shadows of Life					Rex Prod	Universal	Drama	Short	1913-11-09	
1913	His Brand					Rex Prod	Universal	Drama	Short	1913-11-02	
1913	Genesis 4:9					Rex Prod	Universal	Drama	Short	1913-09-25	
1913	The Heart of a Jewess					Victor	Universal	Drama	Short	1913-08-15	
1913	Through Strife					Rex Prod	Universal	Drama	Short	1913-07-13	
1913	The Peacemaker					Rex Prod	Universal	Drama	Short	1913-03-23	
1913	Troubled Waters					Rex Prod	Universal	Drama	Short	1913-03-09	
1913	His Sister					Rex Prod	Universal	Drama	Short	1913-02-09	
1914	The Master Key					Universal	Universal	Drama	serial	1914-11-16	
1914	A Law Unto Herself					Rex Prod	Universal	Drama	Short	1914-11-08	
1914	Daisies					Rex Prod	Universal	Drama	Short	1914-09-03	
1914	Out of the Depths					Rex Prod	Universal	Drama	Short	1914-08-20	
1914	The Hole in the Garden Wall					Rex Prod	Universal	Drama	Short	1914-08-23	
1914	The Midnight Visitor					Rex Prod	Universal	Drama	Short	1914-08-09	
1914	Behind the Veil					Rex Prod	Universal	Drama	Short	1914-08-02	
1914	The Pursuit of Hate					Rex Prod	Universal	Drama	Short	1914-06-14	
1914	Closed Gates					Rex Prod	Universal	Drama	Short	1914-06-07	
1914	Avenged					Rex Prod	Universal	Drama	Short	1914-05-24	
1914	The Triumph of Mind					Bison Motion Pictures	Universal	Drama	Short	1914-05-23	
1914	The Career of Waterloo Peterson					Rex Prod	Universal	Drama	Short	1914-05-10	
1914	An Episode					Rex Prod	Universal	Drama	Short	1914-04-30	
1914	In the Days of His Youth					Rex Prod	Universal	Drama	Short	1914-03-28	
1914	The Spider and Her Web					Rex Prod	Universal	Drama	Short	1914-03-26	
1914	A Modern Fairy Tale					Rex Prod	Universal	Drama	Short	1914-03-08	
1914	The Weaker Sister					Rex Prod	Universal	Drama	Short	1914-03-01	
1914	The Merchant of Venice					Universal	Universal	Drama	Feature	1914-02-01	
1914	Woman's Burden					Rex Prod	Universal	Drama	Short	1914-02-22	
1914	An Old Locket					Rex Prod	Universal	Drama	Short	1914-02-15	
1914	The Coward Hater					Rex Prod	Universal	Drama	Short	1914-02-08	
1914	The Leper's Coat					Rex Prod	Universal	Drama	Short	1914-01-25	
1914	The Imp Abroad					Victor	Universal	Comedy	Short	1914-01-12	
1914	A Fool and His Money					Rex Prod	Universal	Comedy	Short	1914-01-04	
1914	The Female of the Species					Rex Prod	Universal	Drama	Short	1914-01-01	
1915	The Evil of Suspicion					Universal	Universal	Drama	Short	1915-12-28	
1915	One Hundred Years Ago					Universal	Universal	Drama	Short	1915-12-23	
1915	The Water Clue					Universal	Universal	Drama	Short	1915-12-18	
1915	Gilded Youth					Universal	Universal	Drama	Short	1915-11-02	
1915	A White Feather Volunteer					Universal	Universal	Drama	Short	1915-11-04	
1915	The Wolf's Den					Navajo Films	Asso Film Sales	Western	Short	1915-10-09	
1915	Jewel					Universal	Universal	Drama	Feature	1915-08-30	
1915	A Cigarette - That's All					Universal	Universal	Drama	Short	1915-08-10	
1915	Scandal					Universal	Universal	Drama	Feature	1915-07-19	
1915	Where the Trail Led					Balboa Prod	Pathé	Western	Short	1915-07-19	
1915	The Pretty Sister of Jose					Famous Players	Paramount Pictures	Drama	Feature	1915-05-31	
1915	The Heritage of a Century					Paragon Films	Kriterion Film	Drama	Short	1915-04-05	
1915	The Lone Star Rush					Climax Company	Alliance Films	Drama	Feature	1915-03-05	
1915	A Voice from the Sea					Paragon Films	Kriterion Film	Drama	Short	1915-03-27	
1915	The Hawk and the Hermit					Paragon Films	Kriterion Film	Drama	Short	1915-03-22	
1915	The Bond of Friendship					Alhambra Films	Kriterion Film	Drama	Short	1915-03-13	
1915	Fate's Vengeance					Paragon Films	Kriterion Film	Drama	Short	1915-03-08	
1915	A Tale of the Hills					Paragon Films	Kriterion Film	Drama	Short	1915-02-22	
1915	A Small Town Girl					Rex Prod	Universal	Drama	Short	1915-01-17	
1916	The Gilded Life					Rex Prod	Universal	Drama	Short	1916-12-29	
1916	The Right to Be Happy					Bluebird	Universal	Drama	Feature	1916-12-25	
1916	The Celebrated Stielow Case					Argosy Pictures		Drama	Feature	1916-12-02	
1916	The Bugler of Algiers					Bluebird	Universal	Drama	Feature	1916-11-27	
1916	The Evil Women Do					Bluebird	Universal	Comedy	Feature	1916-09-26	
1916	Bettina Loved a Soldier					Bluebird	Universal	Comedy	Feature	1916-08-14	
1916	Little Boy Blue					Victor Film	Universal	Comedy	Short	1916-06-14	
1916	The Human Cactus					Universal	Universal	Drama	Short	1916-06-29	
1916	The Turn of the Wheel					Paragon Films	Mutual Film	Drama	Short	1916-11-13	
1916	Romance at Random					Universal	Universal	Drama	Short	1916-06-18	
1916	The False Gems					Universal	Universal	Drama	Short	1916-06-11	
1916	The Fur Trimmed Coat					Universal	Universal	Drama	Short	1916-05-30	
1916	Naked Hearts					Bluebird	Universal	Drama	Feature	1916-05-10	
1916	The Marriage of Arthur					Universal	Universal	Drama	Short	1916-05-07	
1916	The Eyes of Fear					Universal	Universal	Drama	Short	1916-04-06	
1916	The Desperado					Universal	Universal	Western	Short	1916-03-22	
1916	The Blackmailer					Universal	Universal	Drama	Short	1916-03-05	
1916	John Pellet's Dream					Universal	Universal	Drama	Short	1916-02-24	
1916	As Fate Decides					Universal	Universal	Drama	Short	1916-02-16	
1916	Arthur's Last Fling					Universal	Universal	Drama	Short	1916-02-13	
1916	The Dumb Girl of Portici					Universal	Universal	Drama	Feature	1916-04-04	
1916	The Red Lie					Universal	Universal	Drama	Short	1916-01-27	
1916	The Underworld					Universal	Universal	Comedy	Short	1916-01-15	
1917	The Circus of Life					Butterfly	Universal	Drama	Feature	1917-06-04	
1917	The Desire of the Moth					Bluebird	Universal	Western	Feature	1917-10-22	
1917	The Mysterious Mr. Tiller					Bluebird	Universal	Drama	Feature	1917-09-17	
1917	The Door Between					Bluebird	Universal	Drama	Feature	1917-11-18	
1917	Mother O' Mine					Bluebird	Universal	Drama	Feature	1917-09-02	
1917	A Kentucky Cinderella					Bluebird	Universal	Drama	Feature	1917-06-25	
1917	The Gift Girl					Bluebird	Universal	Drama	Feature	1917-03-26	
1917	The Boyhood He Forgot					Rex Prod	Universal	Drama	Short	1917-03-24	
1917	Alone in the World					Bluebird	Universal	Drama	Short	1917-01-02	
1917	The Savage					Bluebird	Universal	Western	Feature	1917-11-19	
1917	My Little Boy					Bluebird	Universal	Drama	Feature	1917-12-17	
1918	Hands Down					Bluebird	Universal	Western	Feature	1918-02-11	
1918	Midnight Madness					Bluebird	Universal	Drama	Feature	1918-06-08	
1918	Fires of Youth					Bluebird	Universal	Drama	Feature	1918-08-26	
1918	The Kaiser, the Beast of Berlin					Jewel	Universal	Drama	Feature	1918-03-19	
1918	Hungry Eyes					Bluebird	Universal	Western	Feature	1918-02-11	
1919	The Fire Flingers					Universal	Universal	Drama	Feature	1919-04-21	
1919	Creaking Stairs					Universal	Universal	Horror	Feature	1919-02-10	
1919	The Millionaire Pirate					Bluebird	Universal	Drama	Feature	1919-02-10	
1919	The Sleeping Lion					Universal	Universal	Drama	Feature	1919-06-23	
1920	The Honey Bee					American Film	Pathé	Drama	Feature	1920-04-01	
1922	The Girl Who Ran Wild					Universal	Universal	Western	Feature	1922-10-09	
1923	The Midnight Guest					Universal	Universal	Drama	Feature	1923-03-17	
1923	Merry-Go-Round					Universal	Universal	Drama	Feature	1923-09-03	
1924	Love and Glory					Universal	Universal	Western	Feature	1924-12-07	
1925	Hell's Highroad					DeMille Pictures	Producers Distributing	Drama	Feature	1925-10-18	
1925	Ben-Hur: A Tale of the Christ					MGM	MGM	Drama	Feature	1927-10-08	
1925	The Phantom of the Opera					Jewel	Universal	Horror	Feature	1925-11-15	
1926	Three Faces East					Cinema Corp	Producers Dist Corp	Drama	Feature	1926-02-03	
1926	Silence					DeMille Pictures	Producers Dist	Drama	Feature	1926-04-25	
1927	The Yankee Clipper					DeMille Pictures	Producers Dist	Drama	Feature	1927-05-07	
1927	The Country Doctor					DeMille Pictures	Pathé	Drama	Feature	1927-08-22	
1928	The Leopard Lady					DeMille Pictures	Pathé	Drama	Feature	1928-01-22	
1928	Walking Back					DeMille Pictures	Pathé	Drama	Feature	1928-05-21	
1930	Love Comes Along					RKO	RKO	Drama	Feature	1930-01-05	
1930	The Cat Creeps					Universal	Universal	Horror	Feature	1930-11-10	
Rupert Julian acted in these 95 films Rupert Julian directed these 60 films Rupert and Elsie Julian participated in these 28 films Rupert Julian participated in the writing of these 20 films
