= Monroe Salisbury =

American actor

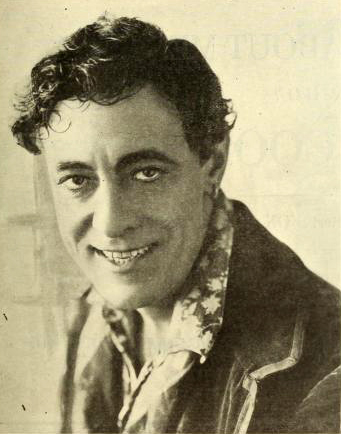
- Moving Picture World, 1919
- Born: Orange Salisbury Cash; May 8, 1876; Angola, New York, US
- Died: August 7, 1935 (aged 59); San Bernardino, California, US
- Occupation: Actor
- Years active: 1898–1930

Monroe Salisbury (May 8, 1876 – August 7, 1935) was an American actor. He appeared on the stage for several years and then became an early film star.

Salisbury was a matinee idol. He began his acting career on the stage in 1898, appearing in numerous romantic leads. He also appeared in five Broadway productions. He was in more than 40 silent movies between 1914 and 1922, working frequently with director Cecil B. DeMille. Salisbury, who appeared in several western films, also appeared in two talkies, in 1929 and 1930. After his career was at an end, Salisbury died at a mental hospital from a fractured skull sustained during a fall.

== Early life ==
He was born Orange Salisbury Cash in Angola, New York, the son of David Cash (c. 1840–1899) and Ellen Louise Salisbury (1842–1929). Orr's two elder sisters were Adelaide Mary Cash (1864–1956), who married John Casper Bosche (1861–1929), and Anna Louise Cash (1868–1951), who married Edward Wright Clarke (1873-1938).

His mother had a younger brother named Orange James Salisbury (1844–1907). She also had an elder brother named Monroe Salisbury (1835–1905), a government contractor and well-known turfman who bred racehorses.

== Stage career ==
Orr took the name Monroe Salisbury as his stage name. He appeared behind the footlights with such notables as Richard Mansfield, Eleonora Duse, John Drew, Nance O'Neil, Minnie Maddern Fiske, and Kathryn Kidder.

While he was performing in Providence, Rhode Island, in June 1900, Salisbury and his mother were staying in a hotel on Weybosset Street when the U.S. Federal Census was taken. His debut on Broadway was in the play Marta of the Lowlands (1903).

== Film career ==
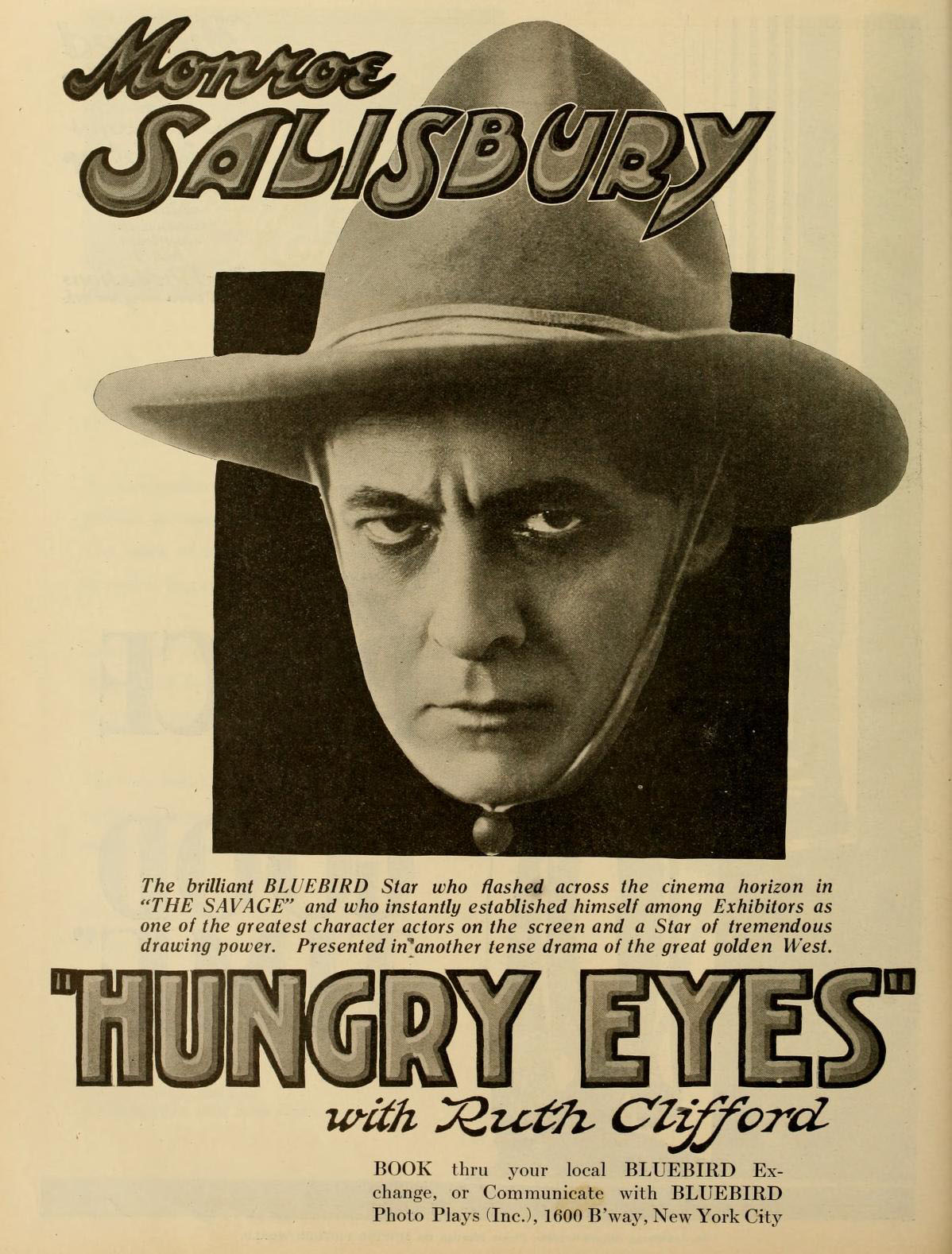
Hungry Eyes (1918)

Salisbury's film debut was in the uncredited role as Sir Henry, Earl of Kerhill, in DeMille's The Squaw Man (1914). He also worked for DeMille in such movies as Brewster's Millions, The Master Mind, The Virginian, and Rose of the Rancho, which were all released in 1914. He also appeared alongside Douglas Fairbanks in The Lamb and Double Trouble (both [1915).

Salisbury scored his greatest success when he starred as Alessandro in Ramona (1916) opposite Adda Gleason in the title role. He then signed with Universal Studios, where he was among the top movie stars for several years.

When he registered for the draft of World War I, in late 1918, Salisbury and his mother were living in the Mountain View Inn at 5956 Hollywood Boulevard in Hollywood.

In the late 1910s he bought a 40-acre (160,000 m^{2}) citrus ranch near Hemet, and, between pictures, it was his habit to drive out and drop in unexpectedly on the Native American overseer and his family who lived on the place and worked in the groves.

In 1920 Salisbury and his mother were still living at the Mountain View Inn on Hollywood Boulevard. He formed his own production company, that same year, and produced and starred in The Barbarian (1920). His final starring role was in the drama Great Alone (1922), in which he played a half-Native American college student and football player, a character presumably half his age. He then retired from the screen.

In June 1928, he returned to the U.S. at the Port of San Francisco, from Kobe, Japan, aboard the S.S. Taiyo Maru, and gave his U.S. address as Hemet, California.

== Comeback ==
With the advent of sound in the late 1920s, Salisbury returned to the screen in two talkies. He appeared in a Christie comedy short, Her Husband's Woman (1929). He then played John Lamar in Universal's 10 chapter serial The Jade Box (1930).

The Jade Box serial was Salisbury's final movie appearances. In 1930, he was living at the Warner Kelton Hotel at 6326 Lexington Avenue, just west of Vine Street, in Hollywood, later called the Hotel Brevoort (and Tropical Gardens)

In February 1932, he returned to Southern California, at San Pedro, from Ensenada, Mexico, aboard the S.S. Ruth Alexander, and gave his U.S. address as 6326 Lexington Hollywood.

== Final years ==
On July 2, 1935, Salisbury entered Patton State Hospital, a mental facility near San Bernardino, as a patient. He may have been admitted under his real name, Orr Cash. His occupation was given as hotel clerk. A month later, he suffered a bad fall at the institution and was fatally injured.

Monroe Salisbury died at age 59 from a fractured skull sustained in his fall at the institution. He was at a local mortuary for a day before his true identity was discovered. Only four mourners were present at his funeral on August 9, 1935, at the mortuary in San Bernardino. His body was returned to Los Angeles, for cremation and his ashes interred with his mother in the family plot at Rosedale Cemetery.

== Selected filmography ==
- The Squaw Man (1914)
- Brewster's Millions (1914)
- The Master Mind (1914)
- The Virginian (1914)
- Ready Money (1914)
- Rose of the Rancho (1914)
- The Goose Girl (1915)
- After Five (1915)
- A Gentleman of Leisure (1915)
- The Lamb (1915)
- Double Trouble (1915)
- Ramona (1916)
- The Silent Lie (1917)
- The Door Between (1917)
- The Cook of Canyon Camp (1917)
- The Desire of the Moth (1917)
- The Savage (1917)
- The Devil's Assistant (1917)
- Hugon, The Mighty (1918)
- Winner Takes All (1918)
- That Devil, Bateese (1918)
- Hands Down (1918)
- Hungry Eyes (1918)
- The Eagle (1918)
- The Guilt of Silence (1918)
- The Man in the Moonlight (1919)
- The Millionaire Pirate (1919)
- The Sleeping Lion (1919)
- The Sundown Trail (1919)
- The Phantom Melody (1920)
- The Barbarian (1920)
- The Great Alone (1922)
- The Jade Box (1930)
