= The Barbarian (1920 film) =

1920 film

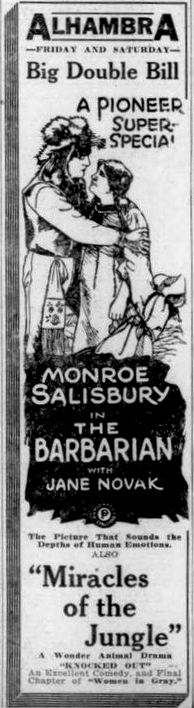
- Newspaper advertisement
- Directed by: Donald Crisp
- Screenplay by: E. P. Heath
- Based on: "The Barbarian" by Theodore Seixas Solomons
- Produced by: Monroe Salisbury
- Starring: Monroe Salisbury; George Berrell; J. Barney Sherry; Jane Novak
- Production companies: The Monroe Salisbury Players, Inc.
- Distributed by: Pioneer Film Corporation
- Release date: September 1920
- Running time: Six reels
- Country: United States
- Language: Silent (English intertitles)

The Barbarian is a 1920 American silent drama film directed by Donald Crisp and starring Monroe Salisbury and George Berrell. It is based upon a short story by Theodore Seixas Solomons.

== Plot ==
As described in a film magazine, Eric is brought up in the Canadian north woods by his reclusive father Elliott Straive, who was a college professor. The boy supplements his immense knowledge of nature with book learning of society and polite customs. A party of ultra-rich people led by James Heatherton arrive and camp on the land, building a tent city for their luxurious convenience. Their object is to obtain possession of the land by means fair or foul. Eric frustrates their plans but falls in love with Floria, the daughter of the land grabber. The failure of the rich to embarrass Eric using sham etiquette is humorous, and there is a fight between Eric and Mark Brant, a man from the party who comes closest to being a "heavy" of the film.

== Cast ==
- Monroe Salisbury as Eric Straive
- George Berrell as Elliott Straive
- J. Barney Sherry as James Heatherton
- Elinor Hancock as Mrs. Heatherton
- Jane Novak as Floria Heatherton
- Anne Cudahy as Sylvia Heatherton
- Michael Cudahy as Roswell Heatherton
- Alan Hale, Sr. as Mark Brant
- Milton Markwell as Mainhall
- Lillian Leighton as Redwing

== Production ==
Much of The Barbarian was filmed in California's Castle Lake district with Mount Shasta in the background.
