= The Jade Box =

1930 film

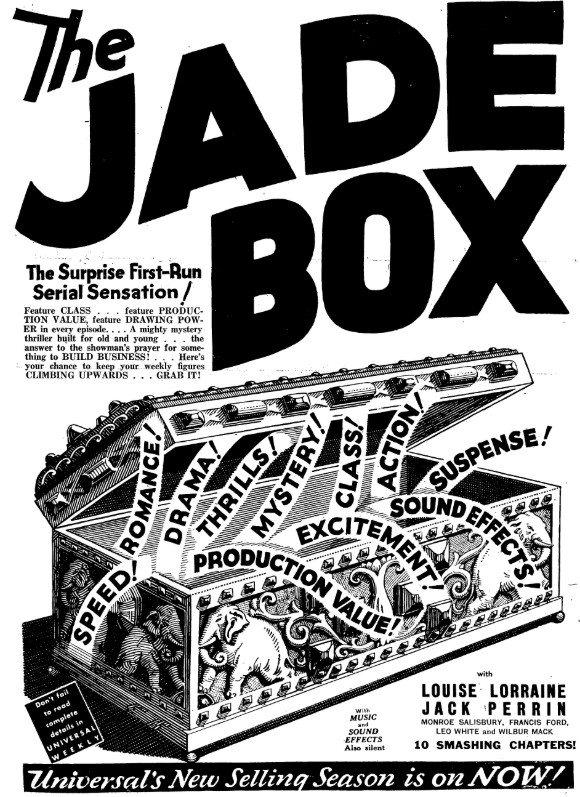
- Advertisement
- Directed by: Ray Taylor
- Written by: Frederick J. Jackson
- Produced by: Henry MacRae
- Starring: Jack Perrin; Louise Lorraine; Francis Ford
- Music by: Sam Perry
- Distributed by: Universal Pictures
- Release date: February 25, 1930
- Running time: 10 chapters (220 minutes)
- Country: United States
- Language: English

The Jade Box (1930) is a Universal movie serial. It was a partial sound film with long silent sequences. Only an incomplete version survives today in Universal's vault, with incomplete footage and some missing sound discs.

== Plot ==
John Lamar buys a Jade Box in Asia but it is stolen by his friend Martin Morgan. A cult, searching for the box because it contains the secret to invisibility, catches up with and abducts Lamar. After discovering the theft, the cult send a message to Martin and the pair's children: John Lamar's son, Jack, who is engaged to Martin Morgan's daughter, Helen. Jack searches for the Box while Martin attempts to discover the secret of invisibility for his own schemes.

== Cast ==
- Monroe Salisbury as John Lamar, original purchaser of the Box and cult abductee
- Jack Perrin as Jack Lamar, John's son & Helen's fiance
- Francis Ford as Martin Morgan, false friend of John Lamar
- Louise Lorraine as Helen Morgan, Martin's daughter & Jack Lamar's fiance
- Wilbur Mack as Edward Haines
- Leo White as Percy Winslow
- Jay Novello as Bit
- Eileen Sedgwick
- Frank Lackteen

== Critical reception ==
Cline states that, while The Jade Box is not of a high technical quality, it did show at the time that a mystery serial could be improved by the addition of music and sound effects.

== Chapter titles ==
1. The Jade of Jeopardy
2. Buried Alive
3. The Shadow Man
4. The Fatal Prophecy
5. The Unseen Death
6. The Haunting Shadow
7. The Guilty Man
8. The Grip of Death
9. Out of the Shadows
10. The Atonement

_{Source:}

Preceded by Tarzan the Tiger (1929)	Universal Serial; The Jade Box (1930)	Succeeded by The Lightning Express (1930)
