= Ruth Clifford =

American actress (1900–1998)

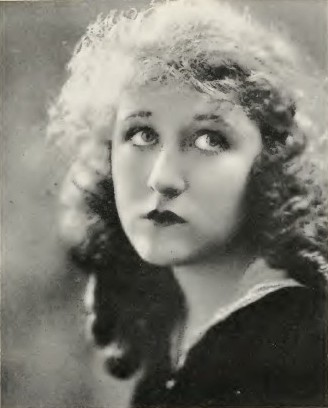
- Clifford featured in Who's Who on the Screen, c. 1920
- Born: February 17, 1900; Pawtucket, Rhode Island, U.S.
- Died: November 30, 1998 (aged 98); Woodland Hills, Los Angeles, California. U.S.
- Resting place: Holy Cross Cemetery
- Occupation: Actress
- Years active: 1915–1977
- Spouse: James A. Cornelius (m. 1924; div. 1938)
- Children: 1

Ruth Clifford (February 17, 1900 – November 30, 1998) was an American actress of leading roles in silent films whose career lasted from that era into the television era.

== Early years ==
Clifford was born in Pawtucket, Rhode Island, the daughter of parents who were both born in England. Following her mother's death when Ruth was 11, she and her sister were placed in St. Mary's Seminary in Narragansett, Rhode Island. Four years later, they went to Los Angeles to live with their actress aunt.

== Film ==
Clifford got work as an extra and began her career at 15 at Universal, in fairly substantial roles. She received her first film credit for her work in Behind the Lines (1916).

By her mid-twenties, she was playing leads and second leads, including the role of Abraham Lincoln's lost love, Ann Rutledge, in The Dramatic Life of Abraham Lincoln (1924). But sound pictures found her roles diminishing, and throughout the next three decades she played smaller and smaller parts.

She was a favorite of director John Ford (they played bridge together), who used her in eight films, but rarely in substantial roles. She was also, for a time, the voice of Walt Disney's Minnie Mouse and Daisy Duck.

Clifford's obituary in the Los Angeles Times noted that she "became a prime source for historians of the silent screen era".

== Stage ==
In the 1940s, Clifford toured the United States as a member of the Abbey Theatre Company and had lead roles in "classic Irish plays".

== Television ==
In the 1950s, Clifford appeared in episodes of Highway Patrol and in commercials.

== Personal life ==
Clifford married Beverly Hills, California real-estate developer James Cornelius on December 5, 1924. They had one child and divorced in 1938.

== Death ==
Clifford died of natural causes at Motion Picture Television Fund in Woodland Hills, California, on November 30, 1998, at the age of 98. Her interment was in Culver City's Holy Cross Cemetery. She was survived by two first cousins.

== Selected filmography ==
- Behind the Lines (1916) - Camilla
- Polly Put the Kettle On (1917) - Polly Vance
- Eternal Love (1917) - Mignon
- A Kentucky Cinderella (1917) - Nannie
- Mother O' Mine (1917) - Catherine Thurston
- The Mysterious Mr. Tiller (1917) - Clara Hawthorne
- The Desire of the Moth (1917) - Stella Vorhis
- The Door Between (1917)- Heloise Crocker
- The Savage (1917) - Marie Louise
- Hands Down (1918) - Hilda Stuyvesant
- The Kaiser, the Beast of Berlin (1918) - Gabrielle
- Hungry Eyes (1918) - Mary Jane Appleton
- The Red, Red Heart (1918) - Rhoda Tuttle
- The Guilt of Silence (1918) - Mary
- Midnight Madness (1918) - Gertrude Temple
- Fires of Youth (1918) - Lucille Linforth
- The Lure of Luxury (1918) - Dalle Aldis
- The Cabaret Girl (1918) - Ann Reid
- The Game's Up (1919) - Ruth Elliott
- The Millionaire Pirate (1919) - The Girl
- The Black Gate (1919) - Vera Hampton
- The Amazing Woman (1920) - Anitra Frane
- The Invisible Ray (1920, Serial) - Mystery
- Tropical Love (1921) - Rosario
- My Dad (1922) - Dawn
- The Face on the Bar-Room Floor (1923) - Marion Trevor
- The Dangerous Age (1923) - Gloria Sanderson
- Truxton King (1923) - Lorraine
- Daughters of the Rich (1923) - Sally Malakoff
- Mothers-in-Law (1923) - Vianna Courtleigh
- Hell's Hole (1923) - Dorothy Owen
- April Showers (1923) - Miriam Welton
- Ponjola (1923) - Gay Lypiatt
- The Whispered Name (1924) - Anne Gray
- The Dramatic Life of Abraham Lincoln (1924) - Ann Rutledge
- Butterfly (1924) - Hilary Collier
- The Tornado (1924) - Ruth Travers
- As Man Desires (1925) - Gloria Gordon
- Her Husband's Secret (1925) - Mrs. Pearce
- The Phantom of the Opera (1925) - Ballerina (uncredited)
- The Love Hour (1925) - Betty Brown
- The Storm Breaker (1925) - Lysette DeJon
- Brooding Eyes (1926) - Joan Ayre
- Typhoon Love (1926)
- Lew Tyler's Wives (1926) - Jessie Winkler
- Don Mike (1927) - Mary Kelsey
- The Thrill Seekers (1927) - Adrean Wainwright
- The Devil's Apple Tree (1929) - Jane Norris
- The Eternal Woman (1929) - Doris Forbes
- The Show of Shows (1929) - Performer in 'Ladies of the Ensemble' Number
- The Sign of the Cross (1932) - Christian Mother at Meeting (uncredited)
- Face in the Sky (1933) - Hotel Guest with Dog (uncredited)
- The Constant Woman (1933) - Speakeasy Floozie
- Pilgrimage (1933) - Schoolteacher (uncredited)
- Only Yesterday (1933) - Eleanor (uncredited)
- Miss Fane's Baby Is Stolen (1934) - Friend of Miss Fane (uncredited)
- Woman Unafraid (1934) - Kate
- Stand Up and Cheer! (1934) - Secretary (uncredited)
- Whom the Gods Destroy (1934) - Frightened Balkan Passenger (uncredited)
- Elmer and Elsie (1934) - Mamie
- Lady by Choice (1934) - Minor Role (uncredited)
- Let's Live Tonight (1935) - American (uncredited)
- Stolen Harmony (1935) - Nurse (uncredited)
- Hold 'Em Yale (1935) - (uncredited)
- Ginger (1935) - Society Woman (uncredited)
- Dante's Inferno (1935) - Mrs. Gray (uncredited)
- The Farmer Takes a Wife (1935) - Yorkshire Pioneer's Wife (uncredited)
- She Married Her Boss (1935) - Shopper (uncredited)
- Paddy O'Day (1936) - Mrs. Right - First Class Passenger (uncredited)
- The Return of Jimmy Valentine (1936) - Radio Actress (uncredited)
- The Crime of Dr. Forbes (1936) - Reporter (uncredited)
- To Mary - with Love (1936) - Nurse
- Hollywood Boulevard (1936) - Nurse (uncredited)
- Four Men and a Prayer (1938) - Telephone Operator (uncredited)
- Safety in Numbers (1938) - Mrs. Hensley
- Keep Smiling (1938) - Schoolteacher (uncredited)
- Charlie Chan in Honolulu (1938) - Nurse (uncredited)
- Wife, Husband and Friend (1939) - Seamstress (uncredited)
- Drums Along the Mohawk (1939) - Pioneer Woman (uncredited)
- The Honeymoon's Over (1939) - Receptionist (uncredited)
- Swanee River (1939) - Bit Role (uncredited)
- The Man Who Wouldn't Talk (1940) - Mrs. Finney (uncredited)
- Free, Blonde and 21 (1940) - Nurse (uncredited)
- Lillian Russell (1940) - Extra (uncredited)
- Sailor's Lady (1940) - Maid (uncredited)
- Along the Rio Grande (1941) - Paula
- We Go Fast (1941) - Miss Kertz - Hempstead's Secretary (uncredited)
- Mr. Celebrity (1941) - Woman In Convertible
- How Green Was My Valley (1941) - Village Woman (uncredited)
- Cadet Girl (1941) - Minor Role (uncredited)
- Road to Happiness (1941) - Ship Passenger (uncredited)
- Blue, White and Perfect (1942) - Ship's Passenger (uncredited)
- Land of the Open Range (1942) - Mrs. Palmer (uncredited)
- It Happened in Flatbush (1942) - Ruth - Mrs. McAvoy's Secretary (uncredited)
- Ten Gentlemen from West Point (1942) - Graduation Spectator (uncredited)
- The Postman Didn't Ring (1942) - Secretary (uncredited)
- Holiday Inn (1942) - Guest at Inn (uncredited)
- Coney Island (1943) - Saloon Patron (uncredited)
- The Lodger(1944) - Hairdresser (uncredited)
- In the Meantime, Darling (1944) - Mrs. Phillips (uncredited)
- The Keys of the Kingdom (1944) - Sister Mercy Mary (uncredited)
- Leave Her to Heaven (1945) - Telephone Operator (uncredited)
- The Spider (1945) - Mrs. Gillespie, Tenant
- Shock (1946) - Mrs. Margaret Cross (uncredited)
- My Darling Clementine (1946) - Opera House Patron (uncredited)
- Mother Wore Tights (1947) - Resort Guest (uncredited)
- Fun and Fancy Free (1947) - Minnie Mouse (uncredited)
- Hazard (1948) - Waitress (uncredited)
- The Walls of Jericho (1948) - (uncredited)
- The Luck of the Irish (1948) - Secretary (uncredited)
- Cry of the City (1948) - Nurse (uncredited)
- The Snake Pit (1948) - Nurse (uncredited)
- Unfaithfully Yours (1948) - Saleslady (uncredited)
- 3 Godfathers (1948) - Woman in Bar (uncredited)
- Not Wanted (1949) - Mrs. Elizabeth Stone
- You're My Everything (1949) - Nurse (uncredited)
- Father Was a Fullback (1949) - Neighbor
- Prejudice (1949) - Ma Hanson's Friend (uncredited)
- Everybody Does It (1949) - Nurse (uncredited)
- Free for All (1949) - Miss Berry (uncredited)
- Whirlpool (1949) - Nurse Eliott (uncredited)
- Key to the City (1950) - Mrs. Anderson (uncredited)
- Wagon Master (1950) - Fleuretty Phyffe
- Sunset Boulevard (1950) - Sheldrake's Secretary (uncredited)
- The Quiet Man (1952) - Mother (uncredited)
- Stars and Stripes Forever (1952) - Brooklyn Navy Yard Nurse (uncredited)
- Flight Nurse (1953) - Mother (uncredited)
- Give a Girl a Break (1953) - Madelyn's Mother (uncredited)
- Prince of Players (1955) - English Nurse (uncredited), Mrs. Jenkins
- A Man Called Peter (1955) - Nurse (uncredited)
- The Man in the Gray Flannel Suit (1956) - Florence (uncredited)
- The Searchers (1956) - Deranged Woman at Fort (uncredited)
- Bigger Than Life (1956) - Churchgoer (uncredited)
- Designing Woman (1957) - Vanessa Cole (uncredited)
- The Last Hurrah (1958) - Nurse (uncredited)
- Sergeant Rutledge (1960) - Officer's Wife (uncredited)
- Two Rode Together (1961) - Woman (uncredited)
- I'd Rather Be Rich (1964) - Director's Wife (uncredited)
- Funny Girl (1968) - Maid (uncredited)

Preceded by Thelma Boardman	Voice of Minnie Mouse; 1944–1952	Succeeded by Russi Taylor
