= The Savage (1917 film) =

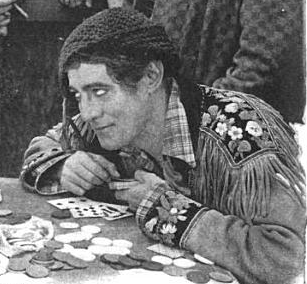
- Film still with Monroe Salisbury
- Directed by: Rupert Julian
- Written by: Elliott J. Clawson (Scenario); Elliott J. Clawson (Story)
- Produced by: Mel Epstein
- Starring: Ruth Clifford; Colleen Moore; Monroe Salisbury
- Production company: Bluebird Photoplays
- Distributed by: Bluebird Photoplays
- Release date: November 19, 1917 (U.S.)
- Running time: 5 reels
- Country: United States
- Language: Silent (English intertitles)

The Savage is a 1917 American silent drama film starring Colleen Moore and Monroe Salisbury that is set in Canada and was directed by Rupert Julian. The film is presumed to be lost.

== Story ==
Marie Louise returns home from finishing school, and catches the eye of Julio Sandoval, an emotional half-breed. She is engaged to Captain McKeever of the mounted police, but Sandoval wants her for himself. Finding her alone in the woods, the half-breed carries her to his cabin, but he is taken ill. Marie nurses him back to health, and when a rescue party arrives for her, she protects him. Back in town, Marie discovers McKeever has been taken prisoner by the outlaw Joe Bedotte. Julio goes to the rescue, losing his life in the process.

== Cast ==
- Ruth Clifford as Marie Louise
- Colleen Moore as Lizette
- Monroe Salisbury as Julio Sandoval
- Allen Sears as Captain McKeever (credited as Allan Sears)
- W. H. Bainbridge as Michael Montague
- Arthur Tavares as Joe Bedotte
- George Franklin as Baptiste
- Duke R. Lee as Pierre (credited as Duke Lee)

== Production ==
Shortly after Colleen Moore's arrival in Hollywood, the Triangle Film Corporation went through a reorganization with the departure of D. W. Griffith for Europe. Colleen's contract was with Griffith's studio, not Triangle, and so she found herself on contract with no projects. She found a part in Universal Bluebird's film The Savage and was given several weeks off from her contract to film her part. In the film, Colleen plays the part of Lizette, a half-breed like Julio. This would be one of several "exotic" roles Colleen would play during her career, including her part as a Persian in The Devil's Claim. After this film, Colleen went on to work at the Selig Polyscope Company.

== Reception ==
Like many American films of the time, The Savage was subject to cuts by city and state film censorship boards. For example, the Chicago Board of Censors required cuts of the holdup and stealing of a letter, two scenes of the holdup of the officer at point of knife, binding the officer to the cabin wall, two closeups of men leering at the young woman after the intertitle "Give me a leetle kiss", and three closeups of the half-breed's face as he looks at the unconscious young woman in the cabin. The Board later made additional cuts in Reel 3 of all closeups of the half-breed leering at young woman at brookside, all but the first scene of the half-breed chasing her, the entire incident of half-breed laying unconscious woman on couch-bed including all closeups of man's passionate contortions and girl's scared face, intertitle "The white man's instinct struggles for supremacy", all other views of couple, and the intertitle "They'll kill you for this".

== Bibliography ==
- Jeff Codori (2012), Colleen Moore; A Biography of the Silent Film Star, McFarland Publishing, ISBN 978-0-7864-4969-9, EBook ISBN 978-0-7864-8899-5.
- Cozad, W. Lee (2006). "Those Magnificent Mountain Movies 1911 - 1939". More Magnificent Mountain Movies: The Silverscreen Years, 1940-2004. Lake Arrowhead, California: Sunstroke Media. pp. 364–65. ISBN 978-0-9723372-2-9.
