= The Sleeping Lion =

1919 film

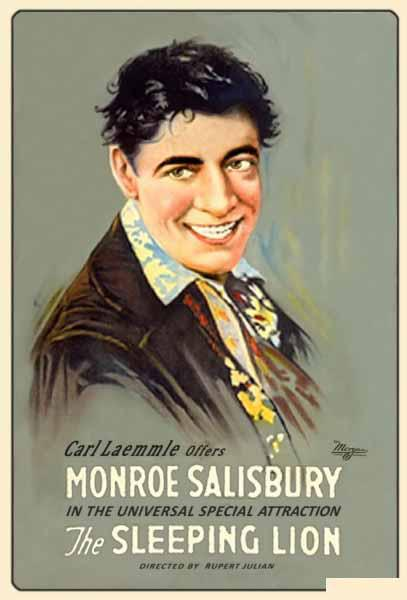
- Directed by: Rupert Julian
- Written by: Elliott J. Clawson; Bernard McConville
- Starring: Monroe Salisbury; Pat Moore; Rhea Mitchell
- Cinematography: Edward A. Kull
- Production company: Universal Pictures
- Distributed by: Universal Pictures
- Release date: June 23, 1919
- Running time: 60 minutes
- Country: United States
- Languages: Silent; English intertitles

The Sleeping Lion is a 1919 American silent Western film directed by Rupert Julian and starring Monroe Salisbury, Pat Moore and Rhea Mitchell. Location shooting for the film was completed at Keen Camp in the San Jacinto Mountains in Riverside County, and in San Bernardino County, CA.

The film held openings in New York City at the New York Theatre and in Los Angeles at the Superba Theatre.

== Synopsis ==
Tony, an Italian American from New York buys a ranch out West to start a new life with his adopted son, but soon gets in bad with the local bully. Both Tony and the bully, Durant, are fighting over a girl, and when Tony learns to shoot in case of a future fight. Tony marches over to Durant and challenges him, they give their guns to the bystanders and engage in a battle royal. Tony's son rides for help and leads some cowboys to his father's aid.

== Cast ==
- Monroe Salisbury as Tony
- Pat Moore as Little Tony
- Rhea Mitchell as Kate Billings
- Herschel Mayall as Durant
- Alfred Allen as Col. Doharney
- Alice Claire Elliott as Carlotta
- Marian Skinner as Her Mother
- Sidney Franklin as Her Father

== Reception ==
The Variety review was positive, describing the film as having "excellent fights" and that the suspense was "first class."

== Preservation ==
The Sleeping Lion is currently presumed lost. In February of 2021, the film was cited by the National Film Preservation Board on their Lost U.S. Silent Feature Films list.

== Bibliography ==
- Langman, Larry. American Film Cycles: The Silent Era. Greenwood Publishing, 1998. ISBN 978-0-313-30657-0.
