= The Desire of the Moth =

1917 film

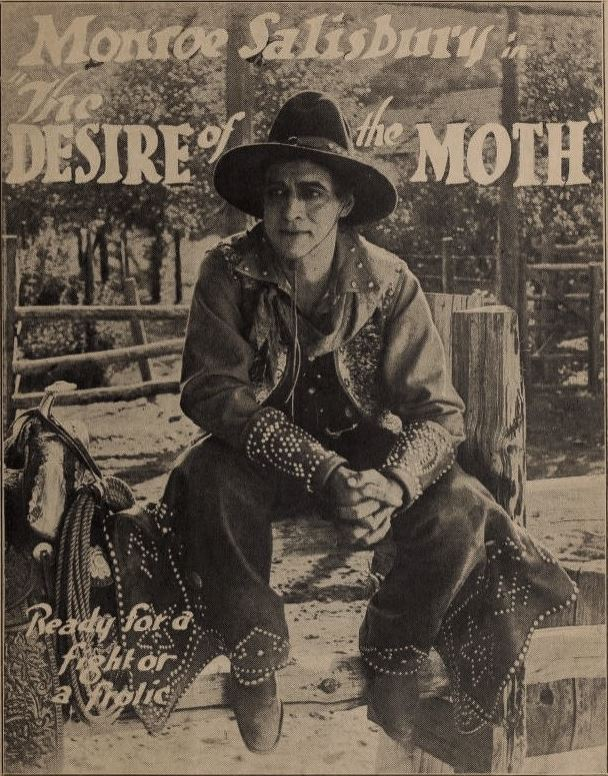
- Directed by: Rupert Julian
- Written by: Elliott J. Clawson; Eugene Manlove Rhodes
- Starring: Ruth Clifford; Monroe Salisbury; W.H. Bainbridge
- Cinematography: Edward A. Kull
- Production company: Universal Pictures
- Distributed by: Universal Pictures
- Release date: October 22, 1917
- Running time: 50 minutes
- Country: United States
- Languages: Silent; English intertitles

The Desire of the Moth is a 1917 American silent Western film directed by Rupert Julian and starring Ruth Clifford, Monroe Salisbury and W.H. Bainbridge.

== Cast ==
- Ruth Clifford as Stella Vorhis
- Monroe Salisbury as Christopher Roy
- W.H. Bainbridge as Col. Vorhis
- Rupert Julian as John Wesley Pringle
- Milton Brown as Matt Lisner
- Allan Sears as Dick Marr

== Preservation ==
With no holdings located in archives, The Desire of the Moth is considered a lost film.

== Bibliography ==
- Paul C. Spehr & Gunnar Lundquist. American Film Personnel and Company Credits, 1908-1920. McFarland, 1996.
