= Naked Hearts (1916 film) =

1916 film directed by Rupert Julian

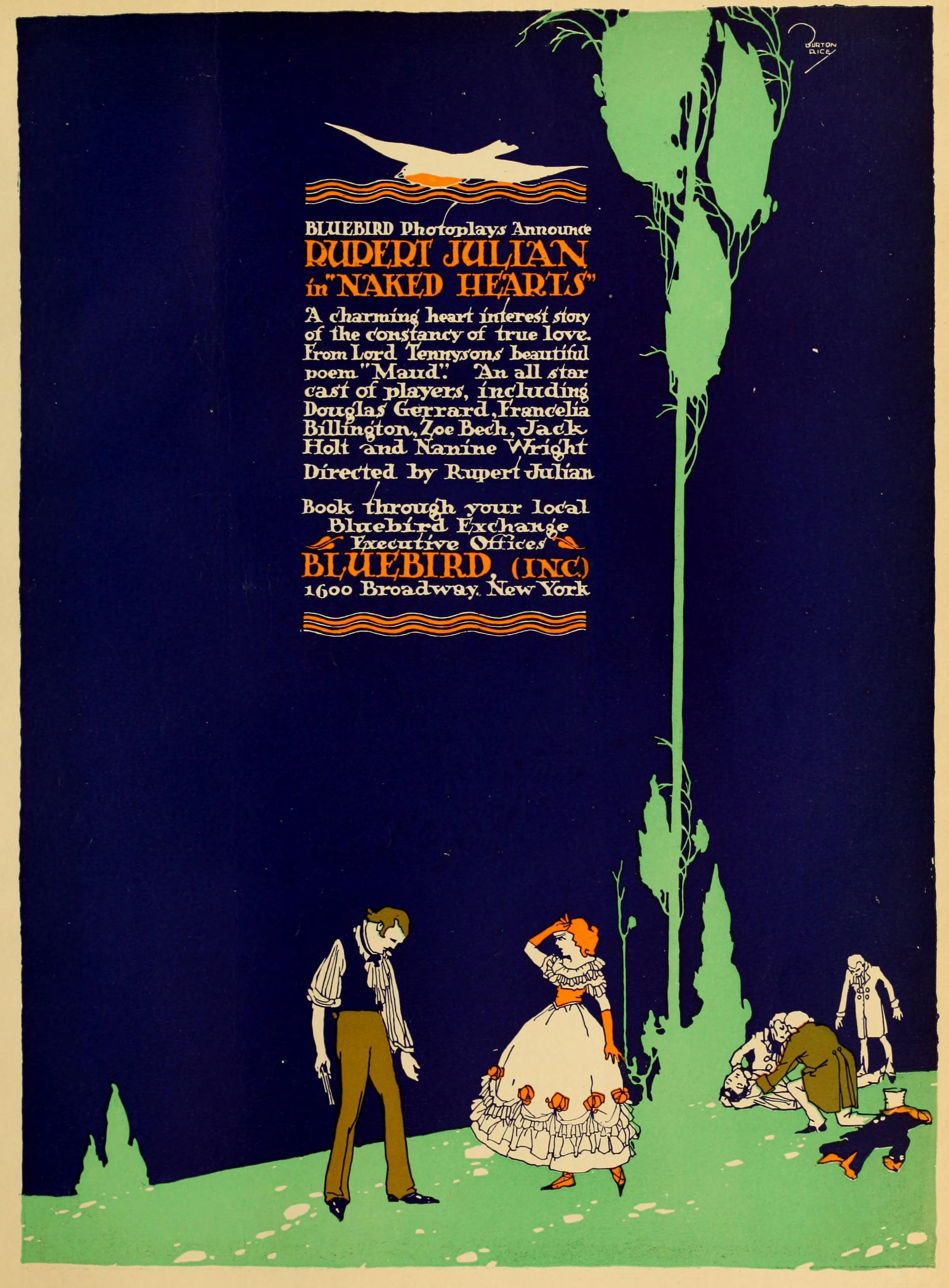
- Advertisement
- Directed by: Rupert Julian
- Written by: Rupert Julian; Olga Printzlau
- Based on: "Maud" (poem) by Alfred, Lord Tennyson
- Starring: Francelia Billington; Jack Holt; Zoe Rae
- Cinematography: Duke Hayward
- Production company: Universal Film Manufacturing Company
- Distributed by: Universal Film Manufacturing Company
- Release date: May 10, 1916
- Running time: 50 minutes
- Country: United States
- Language: Silent (English intertitles)

Naked Hearts is a 1916 American silent drama film directed by Rupert Julian and starring Francelia Billington, Jack Holt, and Zoe Rae.

== Cast ==
- Francelia Billington as Maud
- Rupert Julian as Cecil
- Zoe Rae as Maud, as a Child
- Gordon Griffith as Cecil, as a Child
- Douglas Gerrard as Lord Lovelace
- Jack Holt as Howard
- George Hupp as Howard, as a Child
- Nanine Wright as Cecil's Mother
- Ben Horning as Maud's Father
- Paul Weigel as Cecil's Father

== Preservation ==
With no copies listed as being in any film archive, Naked Hearts is a lost film.

== See also ==
- List of films and television shows about the American Civil War

== Bibliography ==
- Larry Langman & David Ebner. Hollywood's Image of the South: A Century of Southern Films. Greenwood Publishing Group, 2001.
