= The Guilt of Silence =

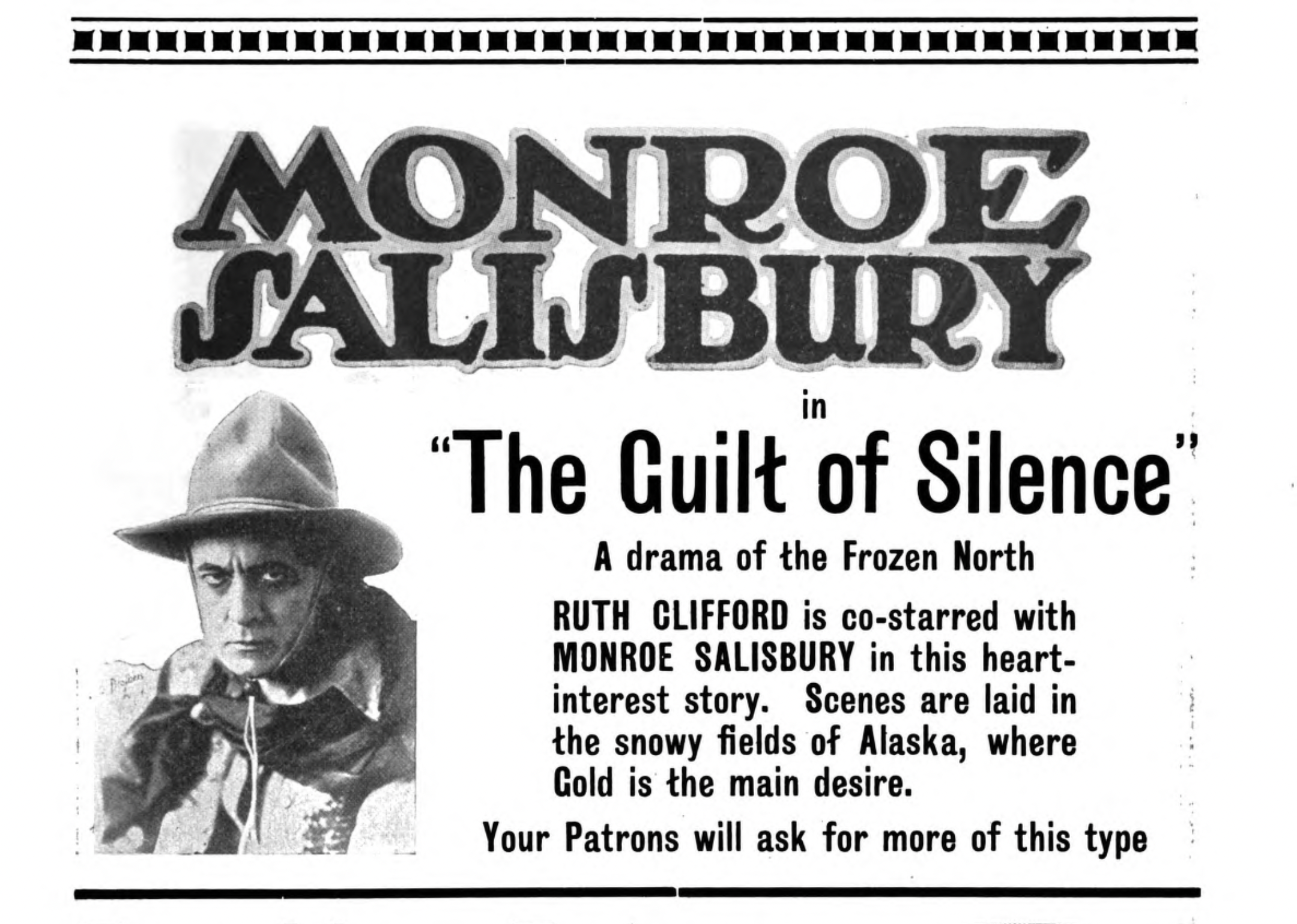
- Directed by: Elmer Clifton
- Written by: Ethel Hill
- Starring: Herbert Rawlinson /Ruth Clifford; Alfred Allen
- Cinematography: Virgil Miller
- Production company: Universal Pictures
- Distributed by: Universal Pictures
- Release date: May 13, 1918
- Running time: 50 minutes
- Country: United States
- Languages: Silent; English intertitles

The Guilt of Silence is a 1918 American silent drama film directed by Elmer Clifton and starring Monroe Salisbury, Ruth Clifford and Alfred Allen.

== Cast ==
- Monroe Salisbury as Mathew 'Silent' Smith
- Ruth Clifford as Mary
- Alfred Allen as Harkness
- Betty Schade as Amy
- Sam De Grasse as Gambler Joe

== Bibliography ==
- James Robert Parish & Michael R. Pitts. Film directors: a guide to their American films. Scarecrow Press, 1974.
