= Hands Down (film) =

1918 film

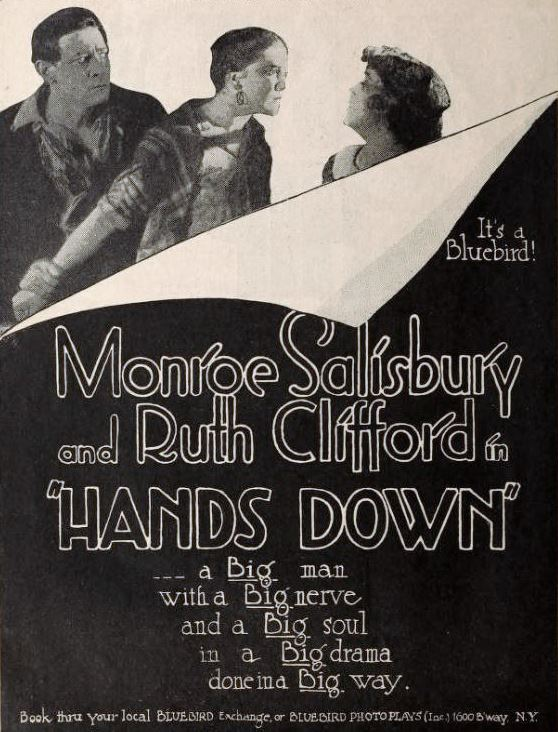
- Directed by: Rupert Julian
- Written by: Elliott J. Clawson
- Starring: Monroe Salisbury; W.H. Bainbridge; Ruth Clifford
- Cinematography: Stephen Rounds
- Production company: Universal Pictures
- Distributed by: Universal Pictures
- Release date: February 11, 1918
- Running time: 50 minutes
- Country: United States
- Languages: Silent; English intertitles

Hands Down is a 1918 American silent Western film directed by Rupert Julian and starring Monroe Salisbury, W.H. Bainbridge and Ruth Clifford.

== Cast ==
- Monroe Salisbury as Dago Sam
- W.H. Bainbridge as Dan Stuyvesant
- Ruth Clifford as Hilda Stuyvesant
- Rupert Julian as Tom Flynn
- Rita Pickering as Marina
- Al W. Filson as Jack Dedlow

== Bibliography ==
- James Robert Parish & Michael R. Pitts. Film directors: a guide to their American films. Scarecrow Press, 1974.
