= Kiss or Kill (1918 film) =

- Directed by: Elmer Clifton
- Written by: Max Brand(novel); Elmer Clifton
- Starring: Herbert Rawlinson; Priscilla Dean; Harry Carter
- Cinematography: Jack Miller
- Production company: Universal Pictures
- Distributed by: Universal Pictures
- Release date: June 9, 1918
- Running time: 50 minutes
- Country: United States
- Languages: Silent; English intertitles

Kiss or Kill is a 1918 American silent thriller film directed by Elmer Clifton and starring Herbert Rawlinson, Priscilla Dean and Harry Carter.

== Cast ==
- Herbert Rawlinson as Henry Warner
- Priscilla Dean as Ruth Orton
- Harry Carter as Craig
- Alfred Allen as Middleton

== Bibliography ==
- James Robert Parish & Michael R. Pitts. Film directors: a guide to their American films. Scarecrow Press, 1974.
