= The Man in the Moonlight =

1919 film by Paul Powell

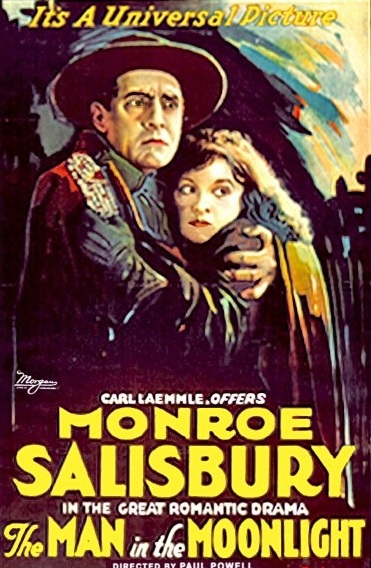
- Directed by: Paul Powell
- Written by: Elliott J. Clawson (scenario and story)
- Starring: Monroe Salisbury; Colleen Moore; William Stowell; Alfred Allen
- Production company: Universal Film Mfg Co.
- Distributed by: Universal Film Manufacturing Company
- Release date: July 28, 1919
- Running time: 6 reels
- Country: United States
- Language: Silent (English intertitles)

The Man in the Moonlight is a 1919 American silent drama film a set in the great north, starring Colleen Moore and Monroe Salisbury.

== Plot ==
Two strangers arrive at the wedding of Sergeant O'Farrell of the Royal Mounted Police and Rosine Delorme. O'Farrell receives an urgent message that Rosine's wayward brother Louis has escaped from prison with the notorious Rossingnol. He puts off the nuptials and leaves in search of the criminals. One of the strangers convinces Rosine to guide him to a cabin at the end of the Passage Du Mort where Louis awaits her. The cabin however is empty, the stranger is actually Rossingnol. Rossingnol carries Rosine to a bed and hypnotizes her.

In the meanwhile Louis, wounded, warns the police are on their way. Rossingnol has Louis take Rosine. At his signal (a gunshot) Louis and Rosine must run for the border with America. The police shoot Rossingnol and Louis and Rosine bolt. Rossingnol dies in the arms of his love, who has followed him, and hide in the bushes until they hear a shot to signal them to head for the border. After Rossingnol is shot and dies in the arms of his sweetheart who followed him to the cabin, O'Farrell joins Rosine and Louis in the United States.

== Cast ==
- Monroe Salisbury as Rossingnol
- Colleen Moore as Rosine Delorme
- William Stowell as Sergeant O'Farrell
- Alfred Allen as Captain Hendricks
- Harry DuRoy as Ferguson
- Sydney Franklin as Pierre Delorme
- Virginia Foltz as Mother Delorme
- Arthur Jasmine as Louis Delorme
- Johnnie Cooke as Sancho Jones

== Background ==
The Man in the Moonlight came between Colleen's work for the Selig Polyscope Company and the Christie Studios. At the time, she was still almost exclusively a dramatic actress and had no comic training. Her roles up to that point (and typical for motion picture roles for women in the motion picture industry at the time), she was a damsel in distress.

== Preservation status ==
A 35mm print of this film is in the collection of the George Eastman Museum.

== Bibliography ==
- Jeff Codori (2012), Colleen Moore; A Biography of the Silent Film Star, McFarland Publishing, Print ISBN 978-0-7864-4969-9, EBook ISBN 978-0-7864-8899-5
