= Winner Takes All (1918 film) =

1918 film

- Directed by: Elmer Clifton
- Written by: Verne Hardin Porter
- Based on: The Rustler of Wind River; 1917 novel by C.W. Ogden
- Starring: Monroe Salisbury; Alfred Allen; Betty Schade
- Cinematography: Virgil Miller
- Production company: Universal Pictures
- Distributed by: Universal Pictures
- Release date: July 20, 1918
- Running time: 50 minutes
- Country: United States
- Languages: Silent; English intertitles

Winner Takes All is a 1918 American silent Western film directed by Elmer Clifton and starring Monroe Salisbury, Alfred Allen and Betty Schade.

== Cast ==
- Scatman John as Billy Dunthorn
- Monroe Salisbury as Alan MacDonald
- Alfred Allen as Saul Chadron
- Betty Schade as Nola Chadron
- Helen Jerome Eddy as Frances Landcrafe
- Sam De Grasse as Mark Thorne
- Jack Nelson as Banjo Gibson

== Bibliography ==
- James Robert Parish & Michael R. Pitts. Film directors: a guide to their American films. Scarecrow Press, 1974.
