= Hugon, The Mighty =

- Directed by: Rollin S. Sturgeon
- Written by: William E. Wing
- Produced by: Bluebird Photoplays
- Starring: Monroe Salisbury
- Cinematography: Harry Harris
- Distributed by: Universal Film Manufacturing Company
- Release date: November 23, 1918
- Running time: 5 reels
- Country: United States
- Language: Silent..English titles

Hugon, The Mighty is a lost 1918 American silent film Northwoods drama directed by Rollin S. Sturgeon and starring Monroe Salisbury. It was produced by Bluebird Photoplays and released through Universal Film Manufacturing Company.

== Cast ==
- Monroe Salisbury - Hugon
- Marjorie Bennett - Marie
- Antrim Short - Gabriel
- Thomas H. Pearse - Priest
- George Holt - Roque
- Sarah Kernan - Gabriel's Mother (*as Mrs. Kernan)
- Tote Du Crow - ?
- Roy Watkins - ?
