= The War of the Tongs =

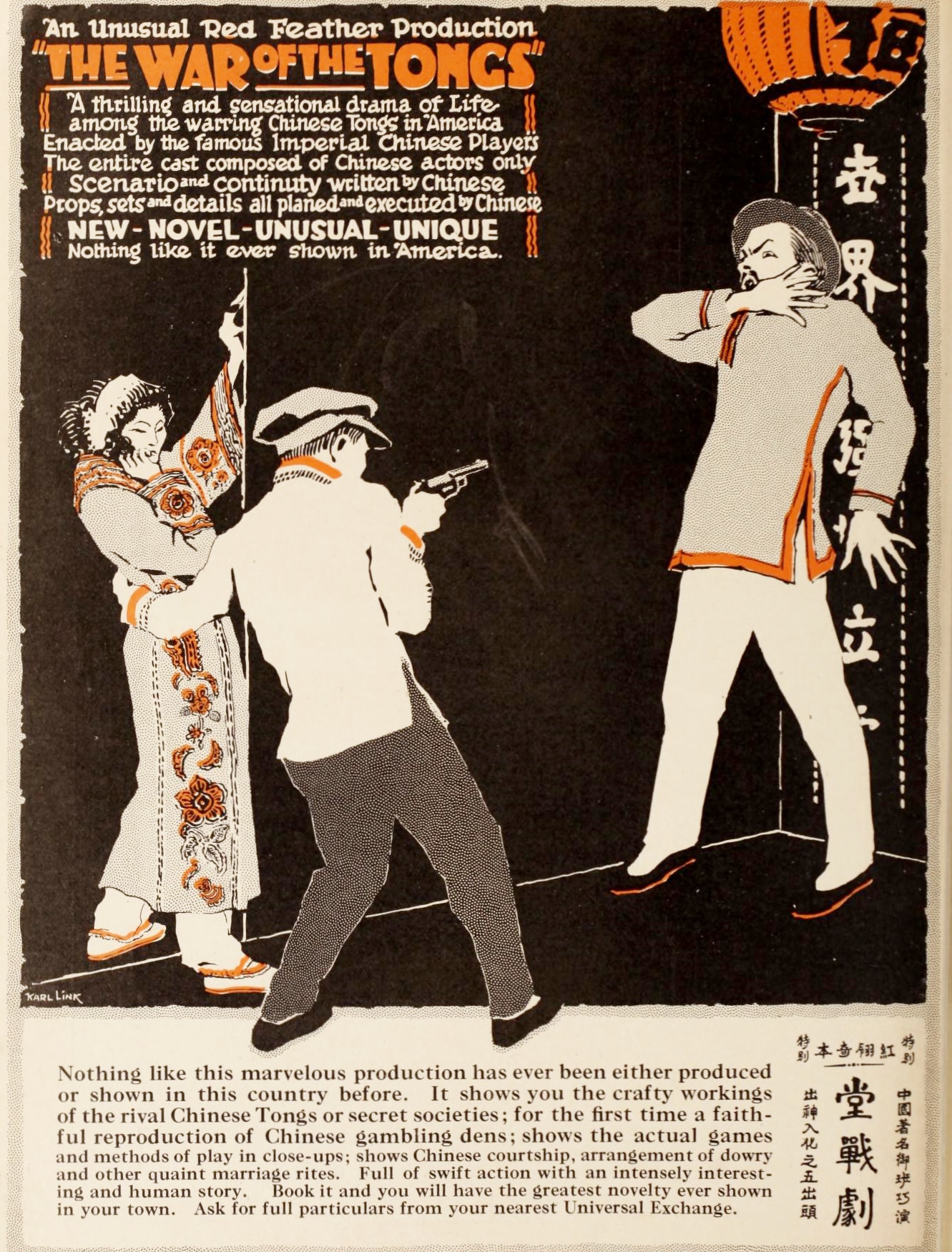
- Directed by: H.O. Davis
- Cinematography: George W. Lawrence
- Production company: Universal Pictures
- Distributed by: Universal Pictures
- Release date: February 19, 1917
- Running time: 50 minutes
- Country: United States
- Languages: Silent; English intertitles

The War of the Tongs is a 1917 American silent drama film directed by H.O. Davis.

== Cast ==
- Tom Hing as Chin Ting, wealthy Tong leader
- Hoo Ching asLee Hoy
- Lee Gow as Wong Wing, tea merchant employee
- Lin Neong as Suey Lee

== Bibliography ==
- Robert B. Connelly. The Silents: Silent Feature Films, 1910-36, Volume 40, Issue 2. December Press, 1998.
