= John J. Cooke =

American actor

John J. Cooke (actor)
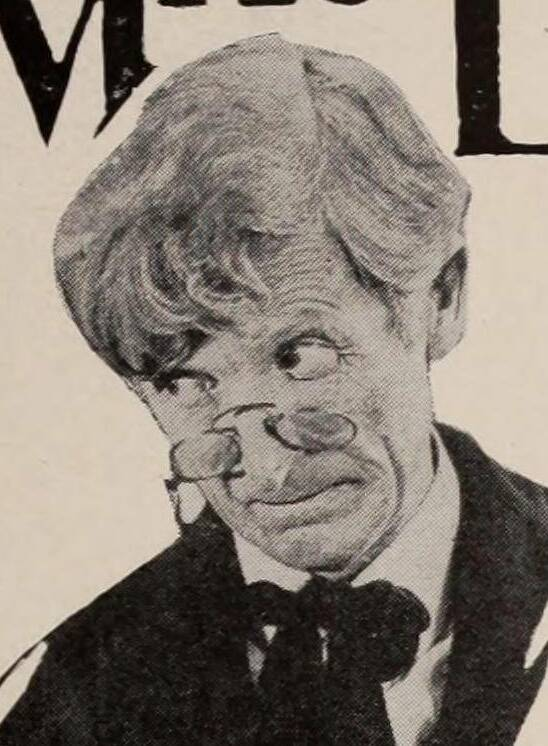
- Johnnie Cooke as Prof. Saxton
- Born: John Joseph Cooke; October 1, 1874; Manhattan, New York
- Died: October 2, 1921 (aged 47); Los Angeles, California
- Burial place: Calvary Cemetery (Los Angeles)
- Other names: John Jay Cooke; John Cook; Johnnie Cooke; Johnny Cooke; J.C. Cook
- Occupations: Movie actor; Stage actor
- Years active: 1914–1921
- Era: Silent film
- Known for: Gloriana; The Right to Be Happy; The Girl from Nowhere
- Parents: Bartholomew Joseph Cooke (father); Mary Josephine Cooke (mother)

John J. Cooke (born John Joseph Cooke; 1874 – 1921) was an American stage performer and a silent film actor. Cooke was born on October 1, 1874, in Manhattan, New York. He was 47 when he died in Los Angeles, California on October 2, 1921. Between 1914 and 1921, Cooke acted in over 30 films.

== Early years ==
John Joseph Cooke was born in New York on October 1, 1874. (Note: There seems to be an element of uncertainty concerning the exact year of Cooke's birth. A variety of sources propose a timeframe spanning from 1874 to 1877. It's important to highlight that the specific birthdate, October 1, has remained undisputed. Cooke completed his federally mandatory World War I Draft Registration Card in 1918. In the section labeled "I AFFIRM THAT I HAVE VERIFIED ABOVE ANSWERS AND THAT THEY ARE TRUE," he affixed his signature as John Joseph Cooke on September 18, 1918. The draft card shows his age as 43 and a birth date of October 1, 1874. Given the official nature of this government record, the birth year 1874 is the most credible choice.) When John was born, his father, Bartholomew Joseph Cooke, was 35 and his mother, Mary Josephine, was 31. He was the fifth child born and the only male of this burgeoning family. At the time of his birth, the Irish family was settled in New York's Lower East Side of Manhattan.

== Death ==
John Joseph "Johnnie" Cooke celebrated his 47th birthday on Saturday, October 1, 1921. On Sunday, October 2, 1921, Cooke died in Los Angeles, California at 8:30 AM. (Note: John Joseph Cooke death certificate is available for purchase from the Registrar-Recorder/CountyClerk, Birth, Death & Marriage Records, P.O. Box 489, Norwalk, California 90651-0489 State of California Certification of Vital Record County of Los Angeles Registrar-Recorder/CountyClerk Certificate of Death 6718. . . John Joseph Cooke Died: October 2, 1921, 8:30 am Born New York October 1, 45 yrs old Father – B. J. Cooke Ireland, Mother – Mary J. O'Leary Ireland occupation – Actor Death Certificate signed October 3, 1921, death caused by "laryngeal hemorrhage" contributed by "cardiovascular renal disease." Physical stress from loud talking or singing can contribute to laryngeal hemorrhage, which is usually small in quantity, but sometimes it can be so abundant as to cause death.) At the time of his death, Cooke was residing with his 78 year-old mother, Mary, and 42 year-old younger sister, Catherine. Cooke chose to be buried at the Calvary Cemetery, located in Los Angeles, California.

A simple obituary appeared in the Friday edition of The Tidings published on October 7, 1921. The obituary read:

The funeral of Johnnie Cooke, a well-known film actor, was held at Our Lady of Loretto Church, Tuesday morning (Tues, October 4, 1921) . . . The pallbearers, coworkers (Universal) of the deceased, were Wilfred Lucas, Bobbie Mack, James O'Neill, George W Kitchen, George O'Donnell, and Dick Cummings.

John was preceded in death by his 62 year-old father Bartholomew J Cooke on October 14, 1901, his second oldest sister Margaret Maud Cooke on December 28, 1907, at age 39, and his fourth oldest sister Genevieve Cooke on February 9, 1919, who was 46. Cooke is survived by his mother Mary J. Cooke and sisters – Miss Catherine Cooke, Mrs. Mary Ellen Young, Mrs. Lillian Gonzalez, and Mrs. Theresa Haskins.

== Filmography ==
John J. Cooke's filmography highlights his acting career, which began at 38. Like other stage actors transitioning to motion pictures, Cooke began as an atmosphere player. These early extra roles first appeared on film in 1912–1913. However, those early uncredited appearances are lost and thus not included in his filmography.

Film authentication

The films in this compilation were verified using the following references.

- Cooke's known appearances in Short films were verified using the following sources: (Note: Short Film refs: 1. AllMovie; 2. The American Film Institute website - AFI Catalog contains entries for over 17,000 short films from the early days of cinema; 3. Kinorium; 4. Silentera; 5. The Universal Silents: A Filmography of the Universal Motion Picture Manufacturing Company, 1912–1929; 6. The Internet Archivelocated @ Internet Archive is a non-profit library of millions of free texts, movies, software, music, websites)
- Cooke's known appearances in Feature films were verified using the following sources: (Note: Feature film refs: 1. The American Film Institute website; 2. An Encyclopedic Dictionary of Women in Early American Films: 1895–1930; 3. AllMovie; 4. Silentera)

◆ Filmography of John J. Cooke (37 films) ◆
Year	Title	Role	Credit	Director	Production	Distribution	Released	Genre	Length	Notes
1914	The Desert's Sting	Professor Edwards	John Cook	Lucas	Kriterion	Kriterion	1914-02-28	Western	Short	
1914	The Feud	Unknown	Johnnie Cooke	Unknown	Universal	Universal	1914-05-29	Drama	Short	
1914	Bess the Detectress in Tick, Tick, Tick!	Cedric	Johnnie Cooke	Curtis	Universal	Universal	1914-07-01	Comedy	Short	
1915	The Kingdom of Nosey Land	The Dwarf	Johnnie Cooke	Mattews	Universal	Universal	1915-11-09	Fantasy	Short	4379
1916	The Bold, Bad Burglar	Second Story Steve	Johnnie Cooke	Mattews	Universal	Universal	1916-03-14	Comedy	Short	778
1916	The Three Brave Hunters	Unknown	Johnnie Cooke	Mattews	Universal	Universal	1916-07-13	Comedy	Short	8099
1916	The Shine Girl	John Kenyon	John Cook	Parke	Thanhouser	Thanhouser	1916-08-27	Drama	Feature	
1916	Gloriana	The Father	Johnnie Cooke	Hopper	Universal	Universal	1916-11-06	Drama	Feature	2987
1916	The Right to Be Happy	Bob Cratchit	Johnnie Cooke	Julian	Universal	Universal	1916-12-25	Drama	Feature	6715
1917	Love in Suspense	Porter	Johnnie Cooke	Beaudine	Universal	Universal	1917-01-06	Comedy	Short	4844
1917	Out for the Dough	James Cartottle	Johnnie Cooke	Beaudine	Universal	Universal	1917-02-10	Comedy	Short	5924
1917	Wanta Make a Dollar?	Cripple	Johnnie Cooke	Beaudine	Universal	Universal	1917-03-10	Comedy	Short	8757
1917	Art-Aches	The Butler	Johnnie Cooke	Beaudine	Universal	Universal	1917-03-17	Comedy	Short	243
1917	The Leak	The Justice	Johnnie Cooke	Beaudine	Universal	Universal	1917-04-28	Comedy	Short	4516
1917	Like Wildfire	Phillip Potter	Johnnie Cooke	Paton	Universal	Universal	1917-05-21	Comedy	Feature	4608
1917	The Gray Ghost	John Reis	Johnnie Cooke	Paton	Universal	Universal	1917-06-25	Serial	Feature	3081
1917	The Battling Bellboy	Mr. Pugilist	Johnnie Cooke	Beaudine	Universal	Universal	1917-08-02	Comedy	Short	450
1917	The Wart on the Wire	Pete the Unfortunate	Johnnie Cooke	Curtis	Universal	Universal	1917-10-08	Comedy	Short	8781
1918	Thieves' Gold	Uncle Larkin	Johnnie Cooke	Ford	Universal	Universal	1918-03-18	Western	Feature	8061
1918	The Widow Dangerous	Unknown	John Cook	Watt	Vitagraph	General Film	1918-08-24	Western	Short	
1918	The Romance of Tarzan	Unknown	John Cook	Lucas	National	Pioneer	1918-09-16	Action	Feature	
1919	Hoop-La	Old Toddles(Clown)	John Cooke	Chaudet	Mutual	General	1919-01-16	Comedy	Feature	
1919	The Little White Savage	Sailor	Johnnie Cooke	Powell	Universal	Universal	1919-02-24	Drama	Feature	4696
1919	What Am I Bid?	John Yarnell	Johnnie Cooke	Leonard	Universal	Universal	1919-04-14	Drama	Feature	8863
1919	The Blinding Trail	Bill Cairnes	Johnnie Cooke	Powell	Universal	Universal	1919-05-19	Drama	Feature	732
1919	The Weaker Vessel	J.B.Hanks	Johnnie Cooke	Powell	Universal	Universal	1919-06-30	Comedy	Feature	8820
1919	The Man in the Moonlight	Sancho Jones	Johnnie Cooke	Powell	Universal	Universal	1919-07-28	Drama	Feature	
1919	The Girl from Nowhere	Dr. Ferguson	J.C. Cook	Lucas	National	Pioneer	1919-09-01	Western	Feature	
1919	Common Property	Stepan	Johnnie Cooke	Powell	Universal	Universal	1919-10-18	Drama	Feature	1451
1919	A Gun Fightin' Gentleman	Old Sheriff	Johnnie Cooke	Ford	Universal	Universal	1919-12-15	Western	Feature	3161
1919	The Pointing Finger	William Saxton	Johnnie Cooke	Morrissey	Universal	Universal	1919-12-24	Comedy	Feature	6270
1920	The Prince of Avenue A	Butler	Johnnie Cooke	Ford	Universal	Universal	1920-02-23	Drama	Feature	6363
1920	Alias Miss Dodd	Thomas Dodd	Johnnie Cooke	Franklin	Universal	Universal	1920-06-21	Comedy	Feature	1009
1920	Just Pals	Constable	John B. Cooke	Ford	Fox	Fox	1920-10-21	Drama	Feature	
1920	Eyes of the Heart	John Dunn	J.C. Cook	Powell	Realart	Realart	1920-10-31	Drama	Feature	
1921	Bare Knuckles	Old Soaky	John Cook	Hogan	Fox	Fox	1921-03-20	Drama	Feature	
1921	Jackie	Winter	John Cook	Ford	Fox	Fox	1921-11-27	Drama	Feature	
The notes section contains three and four-digit numbers that serve as references to locate Silent movie data within Richard Braff's book - The Universal Silents.

== Bibliography ==
- Braff, Richard E. (1999). The Universal Silents 1912-1929. Jefferson, North Carolina: McFarland & Company, Inc. p. 675. ISBN 0-7864-0287-3. "A filmography of the Universal Picture Manufacturing Company, 1912-1929"
- Braff, Richard E. (September 23, 2009). The Universal Silents: A Filmography of the Universal Motion Picture Manufacturing Company, 1912–1929. McFarland. ISBN 978-1-4766-0685-9.
- Lowe, Denise (January 27, 2014). An Encyclopedic Dictionary of Women in Early American Films: 1895–1930. Routledge. ISBN 978-1-317-71896-3.
