= Her Defiance =

1916 film by Joe King, Cleo Madison

- Directed by: Cleo Madison; Joe King
- Written by: Harvey Gates
- Release date: January 14, 1916
- Running time: 21 minutes
- Country: United States
- Language: Silent

Her Defiance is an American short silent film directed by Cleo Madison and Joe King, which was released on January 14, 1916.

== Overview ==
Madison stars as an innocent young country girl who becomes involved in a love affair. The story was written by Harvey Gates.

The film lasts for 21 minutes and is noted for its use of the "matte process" which was used to convey time and distance in the narrative.

Her Defiance is usually associated with other feminist melodramas that Madison produced in 1916, including Alias Jane Jones, A Soul Enslaved, and A Heart's Crucible. Motion Picture News claimed Her Defiance was "a sympathetic subject along conventional lines but benefited by several original situations that add much to its value," on January 15, 1916.

== Plot ==
Her Defiance (1916)

Adeline Gabler (Cleo Madison) is a young farm girl whose brother is scheming to marry her off to an elderly rich neighbor, "Old Scapin" (Willis Marks). When Adeline falls in love with a city boy, Frank Warren (Edward Hearn), her brother Theron (Taylor N. Duncan) takes the first opportunity to trick his sister into believing her lover has abandoned her. Adeline, pregnant, is forced to marry Scapin, but at the conclusion of the ceremony, she creates havoc by pushing her husband away and escaping in a buggy to the city. Scapin and Theron pursue her, but their buggy crashes and Scapin is killed. Not knowing she is now a widow, Adeline works as a cleaning woman to support herself and her son. She is sent to work in her former lover's office, where he finds the baby. Adeline confronts Frank, who explains, in a flashback inserted on one side of the screen, how he wrote her a crucial letter that she never received. The sequence can be read as representing the point of view of the woman as she weighs the statements of her lover against her memories of the events.

Adele Farrington also appears in the film.

== Film techniques ==
Her Defiance was notable for Madison's use of "matting," a process that signified the passing of time and distance. The matte process dates back to the late 1890s. It is used in photography and special effects filmmaking, combining various images into a single image. Madison used this in her final scene when Adeline and Frank are speaking, while past actions are shown on one side of the screen.

== Reception ==
Photoplay journalist William Henry reported:

"Cleo Madison is a womanly woman - if she were otherwise she couldn't play sympathetic parts as she does - and yet she is so smart and businesslike that she makes most of the male population of Universal city look like debutantes when it comes right down to brass tacks and affairs."

In response, Cleo Madison stated:

"One of these days men are going to get over the fool idea that women have no brains and quit getting insulted at the thought that a skirt-wearer can do their work quite as well as they can. And I don't believe that day is very far distant, either."
