= Cleo Madison =

American actress

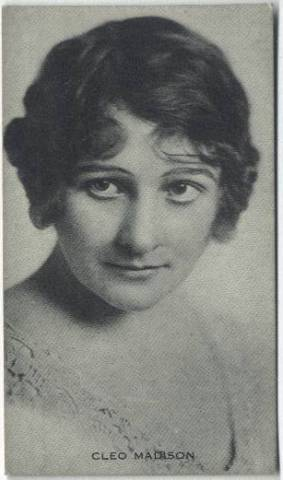
- Madison c. 1916
- Born: Lulu Bailey; March 26, 1883; Bloomington, Illinois, U.S.
- Died: March 11, 1964 (aged 80); Burbank, California, U.S.
- Occupation: Actress · screenwriter · producer · director
- Years active: 1910–1924
- Spouse: Don Peake (m. 1916; div. 1917)

Cleo Madison (born Lulu Bailey; March 26, 1883 – March 11, 1964) was an American theatrical and silent film actress, screenwriter, producer, and director who was active in Hollywood during the silent era.

Madison began her career on the stage. By 1910, she had begun performing as part of a theatre troupe known as the Santa Barbara Stock Company in California. In 1913, she was contracted by the Universal Film Manufacturing Company to begin appearing in feature films. Madison established a name for herself as an actress with performances in films such as The Trey o' Hearts (1914). She is also considered a pioneering female director with a number of shorts and two feature films, A Soul Enslaved (1916) and Her Bitter Cup (1916), to her credit.

She made several efforts to set up a production company before leaving show business in 1924. She died from a heart attack in 1964 at the age of 80.

== Early life ==
Madison was born Lulu Bailey in Bloomington, Illinois, on March 26, 1883, the daughter of Dr. C.B. Bailey. She attended Illinois State Normal University (which became Illinois State University in 1965) in Normal, Illinois. After completing her education, she moved to California in order to pursue her dream of performing professionally.

== Early career ==
She began her acting career on stage with the Santa Barbara Stock Company. She made her first professional appearances on the stages of the Burbank Theatre and the Belasco in 1911. She played the role of the mother in Captain Swift. In March 1912 she debuted as the leading female player in Ernest Shipman's stock company in Phoenix, Arizona; her first production was When We Were Twenty-One. She toured vaudeville briefly.

In 1913, Madison signed with Universal Pictures and starred the following year in The Trey o' Hearts (1914), a 15-episode film serial. Madison played three roles in the serial, portraying both the protagonist, Judith Trine, and her evil twin Rose, as well as the twins' mother.

=== Acting style ===
Madison's performances were based on an acting style she developed during her time as a vaudeville performer, relying on large gestures and melodramatic facial expressions. She did not avoid physical exertion in pursuit of convincing portrayal, as demonstrated in The Trey of Hearts (1914) in which her character endured a number of physical challenges such as being in a car crash, being shot at, and escaping a forest fire. Her characters often defied stereotypical roles of women in film and encompassed heroines, free-thinkers, villains, temptresses, and adventurers. Madison's acting style employed her total commitment and passion to each role, and her performances were often acclaimed as such. Journalist William M. Henry, writing for Photoplay, highlighted her skill by contrasting her emotional performances with her calculating and business-like persona in real-life: "... to see Madison in pictures tells you absolutely nothing about her character. Before the camera, she smiles and weeps with the wonderful sympathy of which only a woman is capable."

By 1915, Madison had become well known as one of the foremost women working in Hollywood, and she began to seek new challenges within the industry such as screenwriting, producing, and directing.

=== Directorial career ===
In 1915, Madison became one of the few women in Hollywood to begin directing her own short and feature films. Madison was among the unprecedented wave of female directors employed by Universal that included Grace Cunard, Jeanie MacPherson and Lois Weber. Madison, known for her progressive views, was eager to begin work and was confident in her own ability. She was quoted in Photoplay magazine:

"One of these days men are going to get over the fool idea that women have no brains, and quit getting insulted at the thought that a skirt-wearer can do their work quite as well as they can. And I don't believe that day is very far distant, either."

Eleanor's Catch (1916)

Madison directed sixteen shorts and two feature-length films in a directorial career lasting only one year. Her most notable credits included the short films Her Defiance (1916), Eleanor's Catch (1916), and Triumph of Truth (1916). Eleanor's Catch was notable from a directorial perspective as one of the first films to use the twist ending; her character is revealed to have a surprising identity.

Both of Madison's feature film efforts have been praised in recent history Her Bitter Cup (1916) is the underdog tale of unionized workers led by Madison's character staging a protest against their oppressive boss. A Soul Enslaved (1916) features a desperate heroine becoming a rich man's mistress to escape poverty, and afterward suffering the consequences of her actions in a later, conventional relationship.

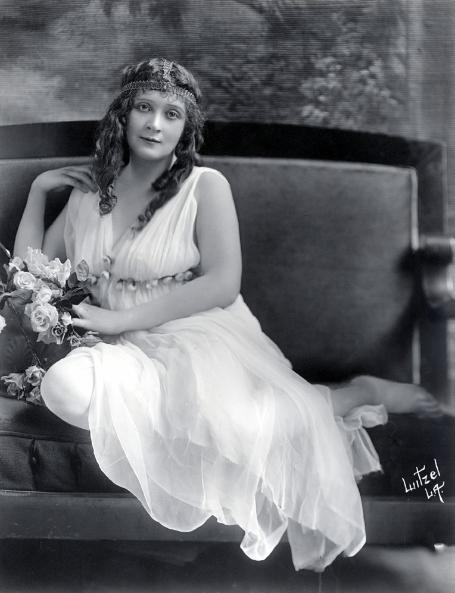
Madison c. 1916

Madison's role as director allowed her to incorporate themes such as oppression, sexuality, and power from a female perspective. She believed being female positively influenced her directing style, remarking once that each of her directed pieces had to have a certain "feminine touch".

Madison's directorial credits end after 1916 for unknown reasons, although film historians have speculated that her status and workload led to a nervous breakdown that forced her into early retirement.

=== Later career ===
Reports in 1916–1917 indicated she was forming a production company with Isadore Bernstein which ultimately failed to materialize; in 1919 she was again reported to be forming her own production studio. During these years she continued to act in films such as Black Orchids (1917), The Romance of Tarzan (1918), The Girl from Nowhere (1919) and The Great Radium Mystery (1919).

By the early 1920s, Madison's career had been steadily declining. Although she remained active with bit parts in several Universal shorts, she no longer possessed the star power necessary to inhabit lead roles. Many film historians point to her enormous output of work throughout the mid-1910s as a cause of exhaustion and exasperation for Madison.

She was rumored to have suffered a nervous breakdown in 1922, attempted a career-comeback in 1923, and by 1924 had permanently withdrawn from the film industry.

== Personal life ==
She was enthusiastic about cars and driving. Madison purchased a 1915 auto manufactured by the Haynes Automobile Company in December 1914. In her work for the Universal Gold Seal Company she occasionally drove a car.

Many accounts that go into detail about Madison's life do not note her November 1916 marriage to Don Peake of San Francisco, California. He was western sales manager of the Briscoe Motor Corporation. The two divorced in 1917.

Before her marriage, she resided with her sister, Helen, in a bungalow in Hollywood. Helen, nicknamed "Sunshine" for her bright disposition, was disabled and used a wheelchair. By 1916 she had been an invalid for eight years. Madison was especially devoted to her care.

== Partial filmography ==
=== Actress ===
- A Business Buccaneer (1912)
- The Heart of a Cracksman (1913)
- The Trap (1913)
- Samson (1914)
- The Severed Hand (1914)
- Damon and Pythias (1914)
- The Trey o' Hearts (1914)
- The Master Key (1914)
- The Sin of Olga Brandt (1915)
- The Pine's Revenge (1915)
- The Fascination of the Fleur de Lis (1915)
- Alas and Alack (1915)
- A Mother's Atonement (1915)
- The Ring of Destiny (1915)
- Black Orchids (1917)
- The Romance of Tarzan (1918)
- The Great Radium Mystery (1919)
- The Price of Redemption (1920)
- Ladies Must Live (1921)
- The Lure of Youth (1921)
- A Woman's Woman (1922)
- The Dangerous Age (1923)
- Unseen Hands (1924)
- Discontented Husbands (1924)
- The Lullaby (1924)
- The Roughneck (1924)
- True as Steel (1924)

=== Director ===
- Liquid Dynamite (1915) (short)
- The Power of Fascination (1915) (short)
- The Ring of Destiny (1915) (short)
- His Return (1916) (short)
- Her Defiance (1916) (short)
- Eleanor's Catch (1916) (short)
- To Another Woman (1916) (short)
- Triumph of Truth (1916) (short)
- Along the Malibu (1916) (short)
- The Girl in Lower 9 (1916) (short)
- Priscilla's Prisoner (1916) (short)
- The Crimson Yoke (1916) (short)
- When the Wolf Howls (1916) (short)
- Alias Jane Jones (1916) (short)
- Virginia (1916) (short)
- Her Bitter Cup (1916)
- A Soul Enslaved (1916)
