= Joe King (actor) =

American actor (1883–1951)

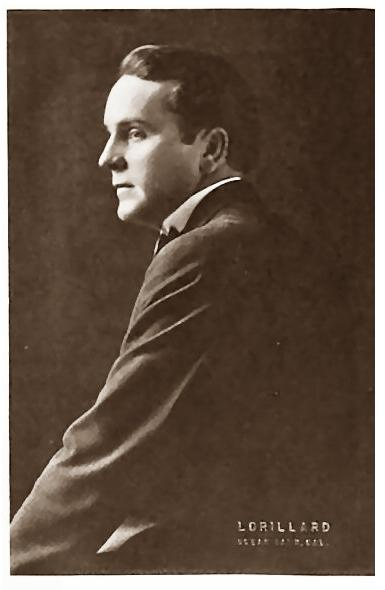
- Who's Who in the Film World, 1914
- Born: February 9, 1883; Austin, Texas, U.S.
- Died: April 11, 1951 (aged 68); Woodland Hills, Los Angeles, California, U.S.
- Years active: 1912-1946

Joe King (February 9, 1883 – April 11, 1951) was an American actor of silent films and talkies as well as a director and writer.

== Biography ==
King was born in Austin, Texas as Joseph Sayer King and acted in 211 films from 1912 to 1946. He appeared in his later years mainly in minor, uncredited roles. He directed two films, both in 1916 and wrote one script in 1915. King was married to actress Hazel Buckham and he died in Woodland Hills, Los Angeles, California.

== Selected filmography ==
- The Battle of Gettysburg (1913) as Jack Lamar, the Confederate Brother
- Her Bounty (1914, Short) as David Hale
- The Pipes o' Pan (1914, Short) as Stephen Arnold
- The Eternal Feminine (1915) as John Strong
- Liquid Dynamite (1915) (Writer)
- Her Bitter Cup (1916) (Director)
- Her Defiance (1916) (Director)
- Wild Winship's Widow (1917)
- The Sea Master (1917)
- Big Timber (1917)
- The Rose of Blood (1917)
- Madame Du Barry (1917)
- The Last Rebel (1918)
- Everywoman's Husband (1918)
- Shifting Sands (1918)
- The Hand at the Window (1918)
- The Secret Code (1918)
- Love's Prisoner (1919)
- The Imp (1919)
- The Way of the Strong (1919)
- False Evidence (1919)
- The Broadway Bubble (1920)
- The Woman God Sent (1920)
- Man and Woman (1920)
- The Idol of the North (1921)
- The Scarab Ring (1921)
- Moral Fibre (1921)
- The Girl with the Jazz Heart (1921)
- Salvation Nell (1921)
- Anne of Little Smoky (1921)
- The Face in the Fog (1922)
- Sisters (1922)
- The Daring Years (1923)
- Counterfeit Love (1923)
- Twenty-One (1923)
- Unguarded Women (1924)
- Tin Gods (1926)
- The Laughing Lady (1929)
- Broadway Hostess (1935)
- Moonlight on the Prairie (1935)
- The Walking Dead (1936)
- Road Gang (1936)
- Bullets or Ballots (1936) as Captain Dan "Mac" McLaren (credited as Joseph King)
- Fly-Away Baby (1937)
- White Bondage (1937)
- Hot Water (1937)
- San Quentin (1937) as Warden Taylor (credited as Joseph King)
- You Can't Get Away with Murder (1939) as Principal Keeper (P.K.) (credited as Joseph King)
- Destry Rides Again (1939)
- Charlie Chan at the Wax Museum (1940)
- Butch Minds the Baby (1942)
- The Big Shot (1942) as Prosecutor Toohey (credited as Joseph King)
- She Has What It Takes (1943)
- Magnificent Doll (1946) (uncredited)
