= Society's Driftwood =

- Directed by: Louis Chaudet
- Written by: Harvey Gates
- Starring: Grace Cunard; Charles West; Joseph W. Girard
- Production company: Universal Pictures
- Distributed by: Universal Pictures
- Release date: October 22, 1917
- Running time: 50 minutes
- Country: United States
- Languages: Silent; English intertitles

Society's Driftwood is a 1917 American silent drama film produced by the Universal Film Manufacturing Company as part of its Butterfly Pictures series. Directed by Louis Chaudet and written by Harvey Gates, the five-reel feature stars Grace Cunard, Charles West, Joseph Girard, and William Musgrave. Released on October 22, 1917, the film follows a woman who seeks revenge against a judge after her younger brother is wrongfully imprisoned.

A scene from the 1917 silent film Society's Driftwood, featuring Grace Cunard.

== Plot ==
Lena Rogers (Grace Cunard) works as a fortune teller to support herself and her younger brother, Paul (William Musgrave). After Lena is falsely accused of stealing a purse, Paul takes responsibility for the crime and is sentenced to prison by Judge Grant (Joseph Girard). Despite Lena's attempts to convince the judge to show mercy, her brother receives a lengthy sentence. Lena blames the judge for her brother's imprisonment and promises to take revenge.

Several years later, Judge Grant has become a corporate attorney and is involved in an embezzlement scheme intended to lower the value of a company's stock. Lena, who has since become a successful dressmaker, approaches the judge under the pretense of making an investment. The judge develops romantic feelings for her, allowing Lena to discover evidence of his financial misconduct.

Meanwhile, Lena falls in love with Tison Grant (Charles West), the judge's younger brother, who works as a newspaper reporter. After marrying Tison, Lena exposes the judge's involvement in the embezzlement scheme. Paul is eventually released from prison and confronts the judge, intending to kill him. During the confrontation, Paul is fatally wounded. He dies in the judge's arms, and the judge promises to become a better man.

== Cast ==
- Grace Cunard as Lena Rogers
- Charles West as Tison Grant
- Joseph W. Girard as Judge Grant
- William Musgrave as Paul Rogers

== Production ==
Society's Driftwood was produced as part of Universal Film Manufacturing Company's Butterfly Pictures series, which featured five-reel productions. The film was directed by Louis Chaudet, with a screenplay written by Harvey Gates. Grace Cunard starred as Lena Rogers, alongside Charles West as Tison Grant, Joseph Girard as Judge Grant, and William Musgrave as Paul Rogers.

The production was promoted in contemporary film trade publications during October 1917. An article titled "A Drama of Revenge" in The Moving Picture Weekly introduced the film as a story centered on a woman's attempt to seek revenge against an unjust judge. The publication also featured photographs from the production, including scenes involving Cunard and other members of the cast.

== Release and critical reception ==
Society's Driftwood was released on October 22, 1917, through Universal's Butterfly Pictures series. The five-reel drama was advertised in contemporary film trade publications, including The Moving Picture World and Exhibitors Herald.

The October 27, 1917 issue of The Moving Picture World included a feature titled "Grace Cunard in 'Society's Driftwood'." The article discussed the film's revenge narrative and identified Cunard as the leading performer in the Butterfly Pictures production. Its appearance alongside coverage of other contemporary releases demonstrates how the film was presented to exhibitors through the motion picture trade press.

The film received attention from several industry publications following its release. In the November 3, 1917 issue of The Moving Picture World, reviewer Robert C. McElravy described the film as an offering centered on revenge and commented on its narrative construction. The review discussed the film's dramatic situations and performances, particularly those of Grace Cunard and the supporting cast.

Exhibitors Herald also reviewed the film in its November 10, 1917 issue. The review rated the story as commonplace, the star as well cast, and the photography as good.
