= Black Orchids (film) =

1917 film by Rex Ingram

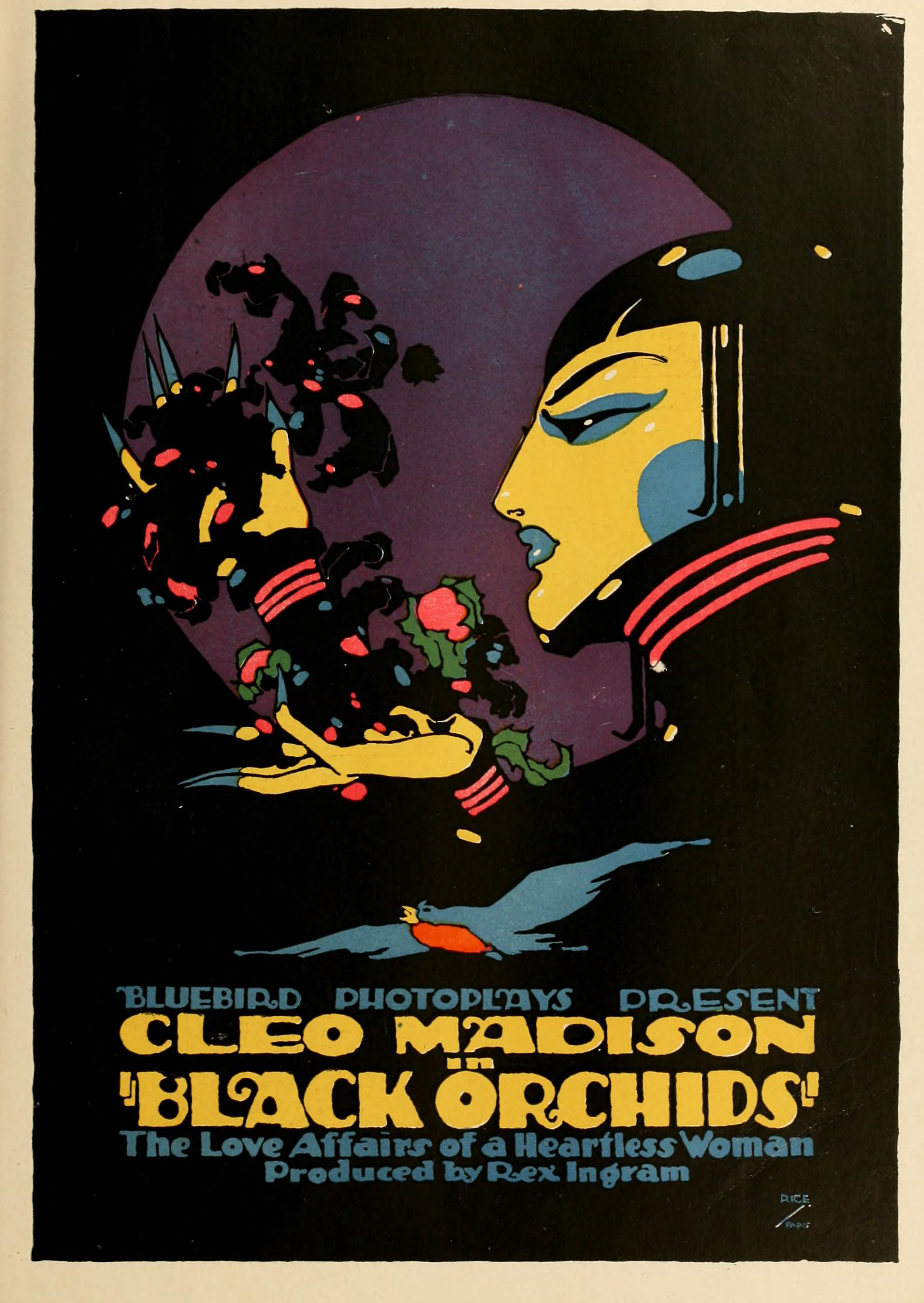
- Film poster
- Directed by: Rex Ingram
- Written by: Rex Ingram
- Starring: Cleo Madison; Francis McDonald; Dick La Reno
- Cinematography: Duke Hayward
- Production company: Bluebird Photoplays
- Distributed by: Universal Film Manufacturing Company
- Release date: January 1, 1917
- Running time: 5 reels
- Country: United States
- Language: Silent

Black Orchids is a 1917 American silent drama film written and directed by Rex Ingram. The film was released as The Fatal Orchids in the United Kingdom. The feature stars Cleo Madison, Francis McDonald and Dick La Reno. Ingram later remade the film as Trifling Women (1922).

== Plot ==
The synopsis released by the studio as printed in Motography reads:

The story is told as one a novelist relates to his daughter to warn her against waywardness. Zoraida, a fortune-teller, has many admirers, among them a diplomat and his son, Ivan. The father sends the son away. Later the woman falls in love with his best friend, the marquis. The diplomat plans to poison the marquis but falls into his own trap and dies. Zoraida marries the marquis. Ivan returns from the war, quarrels with the marquis and fights a duel with him. He wounds him fatally but before his death the marquis plans a revenge which brings about the death of Zoraida and Ivan.

== Cast ==
- Cleo Madison as Marie de Severac/Zoraida
- Francis McDonald as George Renoir/Ivan
- Dick La Reno as Emile de Severac
- Wedgwood Nowell as Marquis de Chantal
- Howard Crampton as Baron de Maupin
- John George as Ali Bara
- William J. Dyer as Proprietor of l'Hirbour Blanc

== Reviews and reception ==
A write-up about the film in the Exhibitor's Trade Review notes that the story-telling device served to sidestep the censors: "Indeed, were it not for this method of picturing the adventures of the man-enslaving Zoraida, one can hardly imagine the film being offered as screen entertainment, in this country at least." Edward Weitzel wrote in his review of the film in the Moving Picture World, that the drama "deals almost exclusively with open defiance of all moral law, but ... holds the spectator's undivided attention to the end". Weitzel also commented on Ingram's direction, saying: "While no points of the plot are glossed over or left in doubt, there is no undue stress put upon any of the incidents and the atmosphere which surrounds the entire story belongs to it by right of birth."

== Preservation ==
With no prints of Black Orchids located in any film archives, it is considered a lost film. In February 2021, the film was cited by the National Film Preservation Board on their Lost U.S. Silent Feature Films list.

== See also ==
- List of lost films
