= Olga Printzlau =

American screenwriter

Olga Charlotte Printzlau
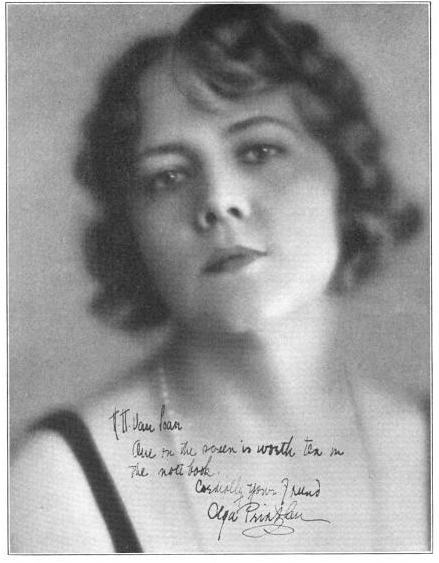
- Born: December 13, 1891; Philadelphia, Pennsylvania, US
- Died: July 8, 1962 (aged 70); Hollywood, California, USA
- Occupation: Screenwriter
- Years active: 1915–1933

Olga Printzlau (December 13, 1891 – July 8, 1962) was an American screenwriter. She wrote for more than 60 films between 1915 and 1933. She also wrote a play, Window Panes, which was staged in Los Angeles in 1928, and won praise from the Los Angeles Times. She was born in Philadelphia, Pennsylvania, and died in Hollywood, California, from a heart attack.

== Selected filmography ==
- Coral (1915)
- Where the Forest Ends (1915)
- The Ring of Destiny (1915)
- The Woman Who Lied (1915)
- A Soul Enslaved (1916)
- The Yaqui (1916)
- Two Men of Sandy Bar (1916)
- John Needham's Double (1916)
- Naked Hearts (1916)
- To Honor and Obey (1917)
- One More American (1918)
- Believe Me, Xantippe (1918)
- The City of Tears (1918)
- Lawless Love (1918)
- Why Change Your Wife? (1920)
- Jack Straw (1920)
- The Prince Chap (1920)
- Conrad in Quest of His Youth (1920)
- Midsummer Madness (1921)
- What Every Woman Knows (1921)
- The Lost Romance (1921)
- The Cradle (1922)
- Through a Glass Window (1922)
- The Bachelor Daddy (1922)
- Burning Sands (1922)
- The Beautiful and Damned (1922)
- Little Church Around the Corner (1923)
- Maytime (1923)
- Mothers-in-Law (1923)
- Daughters of the Rich (1923)
- Butterfly (1924)
- White Man (1924)
- The Age of Innocence (1924)
- Her Market Value (1925)
- Fifth Avenue Models (1925)
- Headlines (1925)
- The Beautiful Cheat (1926)
- Pals First (1926)
- The Miracle of Life (1926)
- Camille (1926)
- His Dog (1927)
- The Tragedy of Youth (1928)
- Fashion Madness (1928)
- Hearts of Humanity (1932)
- Broken Dreams (1933)
- Marriage on Approval (1933)
