= Lucille Love, Girl of Mystery =

1914 film directed by Francis Ford

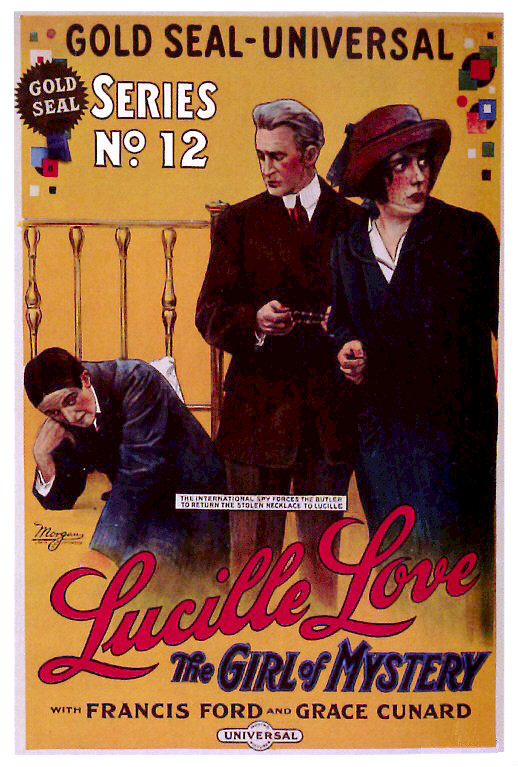
- Film poster
- Directed by: Francis Ford
- Written by: Grace Cunard; Francis Ford
- Starring: Grace Cunard; Francis Ford
- Distributed by: Universal Film Manufacturing Co.
- Release date: April 14, 1914
- Running time: 15 episodes (300 minutes) (20 Minutes per Episode)
- Country: United States
- Languages: Silent; English intertitles
- Budget: $30,000
- Box office: $1.5 million

Lucille Love, Girl of Mystery is a 1914 American action film serial directed by Francis Ford. It was the first serial by Universal. It was originally intended to be a short subject. The serial is now considered to be lost with only four episodes surviving. Prints and/or fragments were found in the Dawson Film Find in 1978. The head of the Universal City Zoo, animal trainer Doc Kirby, was mauled by a lion during production and died shortly thereafter from a septic infection of the wound.

== Cast ==
- Grace Cunard as Lucille Love
- Francis Ford as Loubeque / Hugo
- Harry Schumm as Lieutenant Gibson
- Ernest Shields as Thompson
- Edgar Keller as Sumpter Love (as E.M. Keller)
- Eddie Boland as Government Aviator
- Wilbur Higby
- Burton Law
- Jean Hathaway
- William White (as Billy White)
- Harry L. Rattenberry
- John Ford (as Jack Ford)

== See also ==
- List of film serials
- List of film serials by studio
