= Hell's Crater =

1918 film

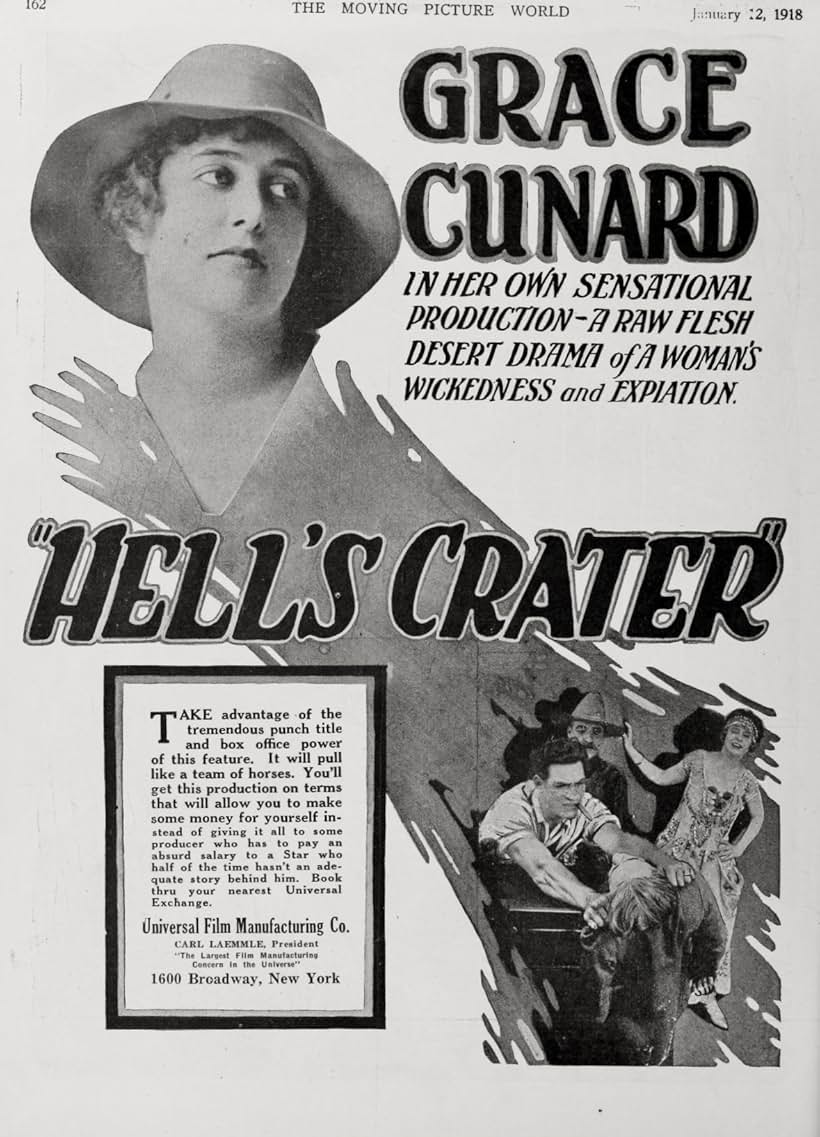
- Film ad
- Directed by: W.B. Pearson
- Written by: W.B. Pearson
- Produced by: W.B. Pearson
- Starring: Grace Cunard; George A. McDaniel; Eileen Sedgwick
- Production company: Universal Pictures
- Distributed by: Universal Pictures
- Release date: January 14, 1918
- Running time: 50 minutes
- Country: United States
- Languages: Silent; English intertitles

Hell's Crater is a 1918 American silent Western film directed by W.B. Pearson and starring Grace Cunard, George A. McDaniel and Eileen Sedgwick.

== Cast ==
- Grace Cunard
- George A. McDaniel
- Ray Hanford
- Eileen Sedgwick
