= The Lure of Youth =

1929 film directed by Phil Rosen

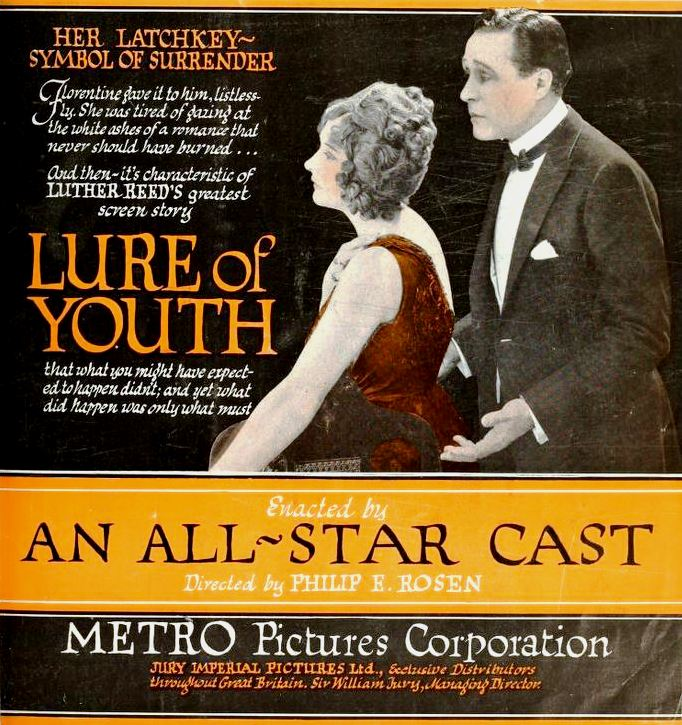
- Directed by: Phil Rosen
- Written by: Luther Reed
- Produced by: Bayard Veiller
- Starring: Cleo Madison; William Conklin; Gareth Hughes
- Cinematography: Robert Kurrle
- Production company: Metro Pictures
- Release date: January 10, 1921 (US)
- Running time: 6 reels
- Country: United States
- Language: English

The Lure of Youth is a 1921 American silent romance film, directed by Phil Rosen. It stars Cleo Madison, William Conklin, and Gareth Hughes, and was released on January 10, 1921.

== Cast ==
- Cleo Madison as Florentine Fair
- William Conklin as Morton Mortimer
- Gareth Hughes as Roger Dent
- Lydia Knott as Ma Dent
- William Courtwright as Pa Dent
- Helen Weer as Marjorie Farnol
