= The Ring of Destiny =

1915 film

- Directed by: Cleo Madison
- Written by: Olga Printzlau; Marshall Stedman
- Starring: Cleo Madison
- Release date: November 18, 1915
- Running time: 20 minutes
- Country: United States
- Languages: Silent; English intertitles

The Ring of Destiny is a 1915 American Western film, directed by and starring Cleo Madison.

== Plot ==
This plot summary was taken from the original copyright filing with the Library of Congress:

Jack and Dolly, his sister, live together in the West, and are devotedly attached to each other. On Jack's birthday, Dolly presents him with a peculiar ring and to finish up the day's rejoicing there is a big masquerade ball that night. The brother and sister attend the dance, each dressed in the other's clothes. Dolly, being taken for a man, meets Big Bill, a new ranchman, and he courteously offers her a cigar, which she manfully tries to smoke. Jack sees her distress, and, coming to her rescue, is introduced as the sister. The stranger notes the peculiar ring he wears and comments on it.

The next morning Jack leaves to look over his stock and kisses Dolly fondly. While riding through the sage brush, he takes a shot at a rabbit and the bullet lands near the spot where a cattle rustler is plying his unlawful trade. Jack comes upon him unexpectedly, and he, thinking Jack had intentionally shot at him, attacks Jack. A fierce fight follows during which the rustler shoots Jack in the back. The rustler "cleans" out Jack's pockets, and also takes the birthday ring. Jack's horse, frightened by the noise, returns home and Dolly is wild with anxiety. Hurriedly gathering a posse, they set out and soon discover Jack's body.

After two weeks of earnest search the sheriff and his posse return without having seen the murderer and so report to Dolly. She, very bitter because of her brother's murder, determines to run the man down herself, and sets out amid the best wishes of the cowboys. Dolly disguises herself as a cowboy and valiantly sets out. Her funds soon run low, however, and she is forced to seek work to carry on her search. Dolly approaches a ranch house and meets the owner, who is Big Bill, and as he has taken a liking to what he thinks is a young fellow, he gladly gives her a job.

In the days that pass, Big Bill begins to doubt the sex of his new employe, but keeps his suspicions to himself. One day he asks the cowboy to accompany him to town and, while there, Dolly wanders into a saloon to watch the games in progress. Bill follows, keeping a close watch. Suddenly one of the players who is heavily losing, pulls out a sack and empties its contents on the table.

Dolly receives a shock when she sees the ring she had given Jack, and at once guesses his identity. Dolly denounces him and they have a terrific fight. Bill tries to interfere, but the boys, thinking she is a man, hold him off. In the melee, Dolly's hair comes down and her sex is revealed. The fight is quickly stopped and Dolly tells of the murder. The rustler is delivered to the sheriff, and Big Bill takes Dolly home, where he offers her a new job as boss of his ranch.

== Cast ==
- Cleo Madison
- Joe King
- Hoot Gibson
- William Steele as William Gettinger

== See also ==
- Hoot Gibson filmography
