= The Trey o' Hearts =

1914 film

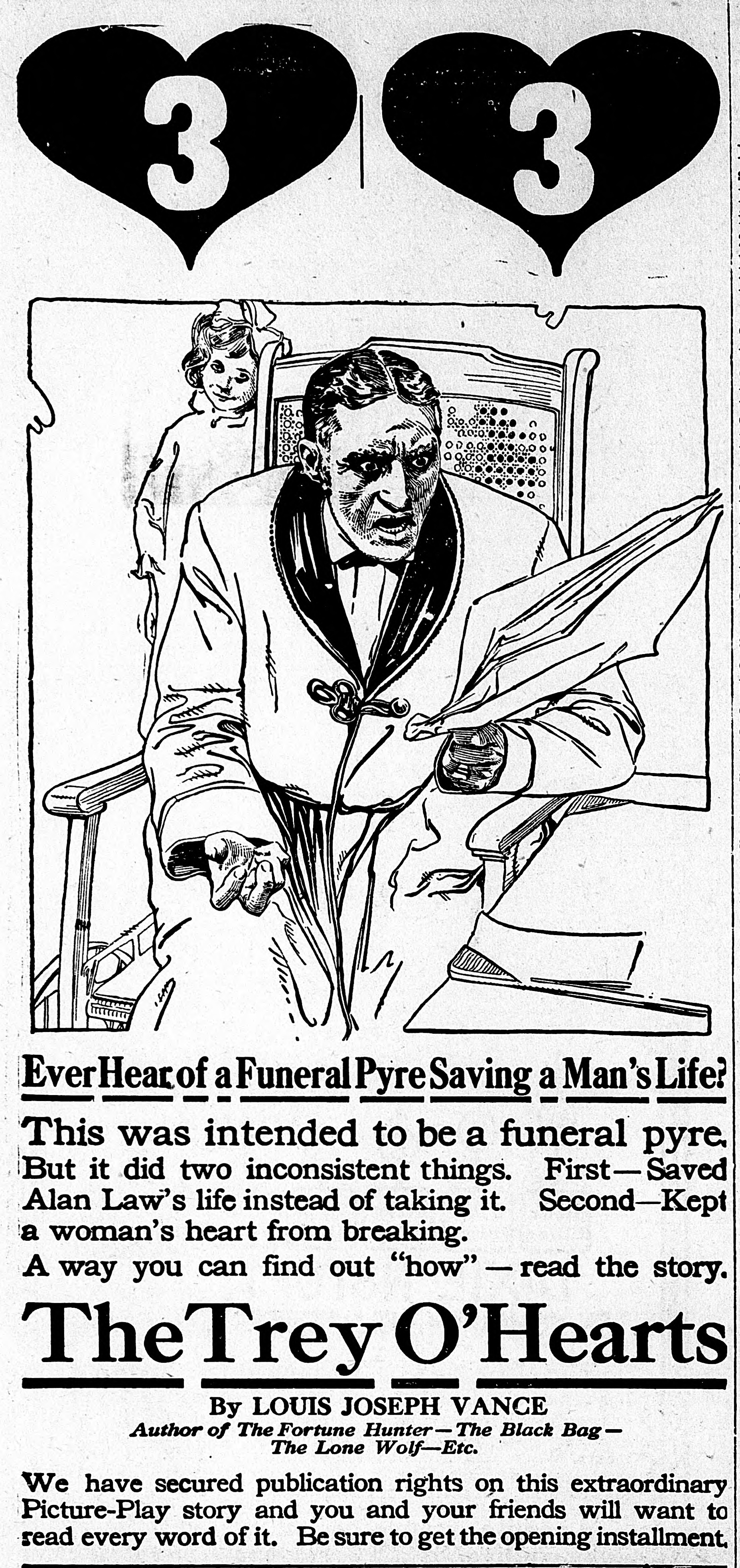
- Newspaper advertisement
- Directed by: Wilfred Lucas; Henry MacRae
- Written by: Bess Meredyth; Allan Dwan; Louis Joseph Vance (story)
- Starring: Cleo Madison; George Larkin
- Distributed by: Universal Film Manufacturing Co.
- Release date: August 4, 1914
- Running time: 15 episodes
- Country: United States
- Languages: Silent; English intertitles

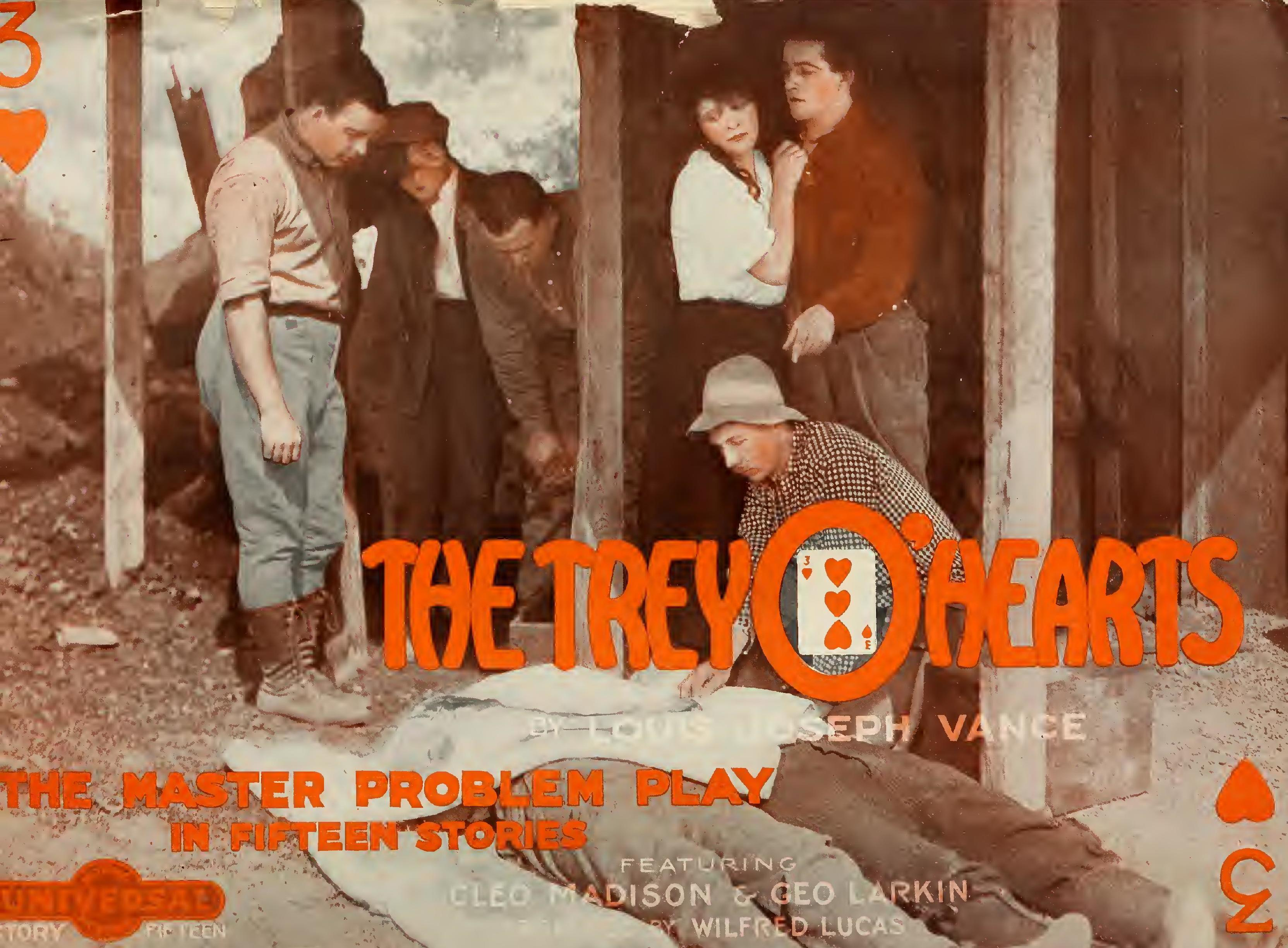
The Trey o' Hearts advertisement in 1914

The Trey o' Hearts is a 1914 American 15-chapter action film serial directed by Wilfred Lucas and Henry MacRae. It was written by Allan Dwan and Bess Meredyth, based on a story of the same name by Louis Joseph Vance. The first chapter ran 3 reels, while the others were two-reelers. The film is currently considered to be lost. Some sources list Lon Chaney in the cast (uncredited), but this is disputed and unconfirmed.

== Plot ==
An evil young woman named Judith Trine and her father are plotting to destroy Alan Law, because for many years her father hated Alan's father, and now they have transferred that hatred onto Alan himself. Judith's twin sister Rose is in love with Alan. As the serial progresses, Alan manages to survive a number of life-threatening events. Over time, Judith finds herself falling in love with Alan. On the day of their wedding in a chapel, Rose and Alan are struck by lightning. Rose is killed, and Alan is badly injured. Unbeknownst to Alan, Judith takes Rose's place and nurses him back to health.

== Cast ==
- Cleo Madison as Rose Trine / Judith Trine
- George Larkin as Alan Law, The Hero
- Edward Sloman as Seneca Trine, The Father
- Tom Walsh as Barcus
- Ray Hanford as Marrophat, The Villain
- Charles Brinley
- Doris Pawn

== Chapter titles ==
1. Flower o' Flames (released August 4, 1914)
2. White Water (August 11)
3. The Sea Venture (August 18)
4. Dead Reckoning (August 25)
5. The Sunset Tide (September 1)
6. The Crack o' Doom (September 8)
7. The Stalemate (September 15)
8. The Mock Rose (September 22)
9. As the Crow Flies (September 29)
10. Steel Ribbons (October 6)
11. The Painted Hills (October 13)
12. The Mirage (October 20)
13. The Jaws of Death (October 27)
14. The First Law (November 3)
15. The Last Trump (November 10)

== See also ==
- List of film serials
- List of film serials by studio
- List of lost films
