= Willis Marks =

American actor

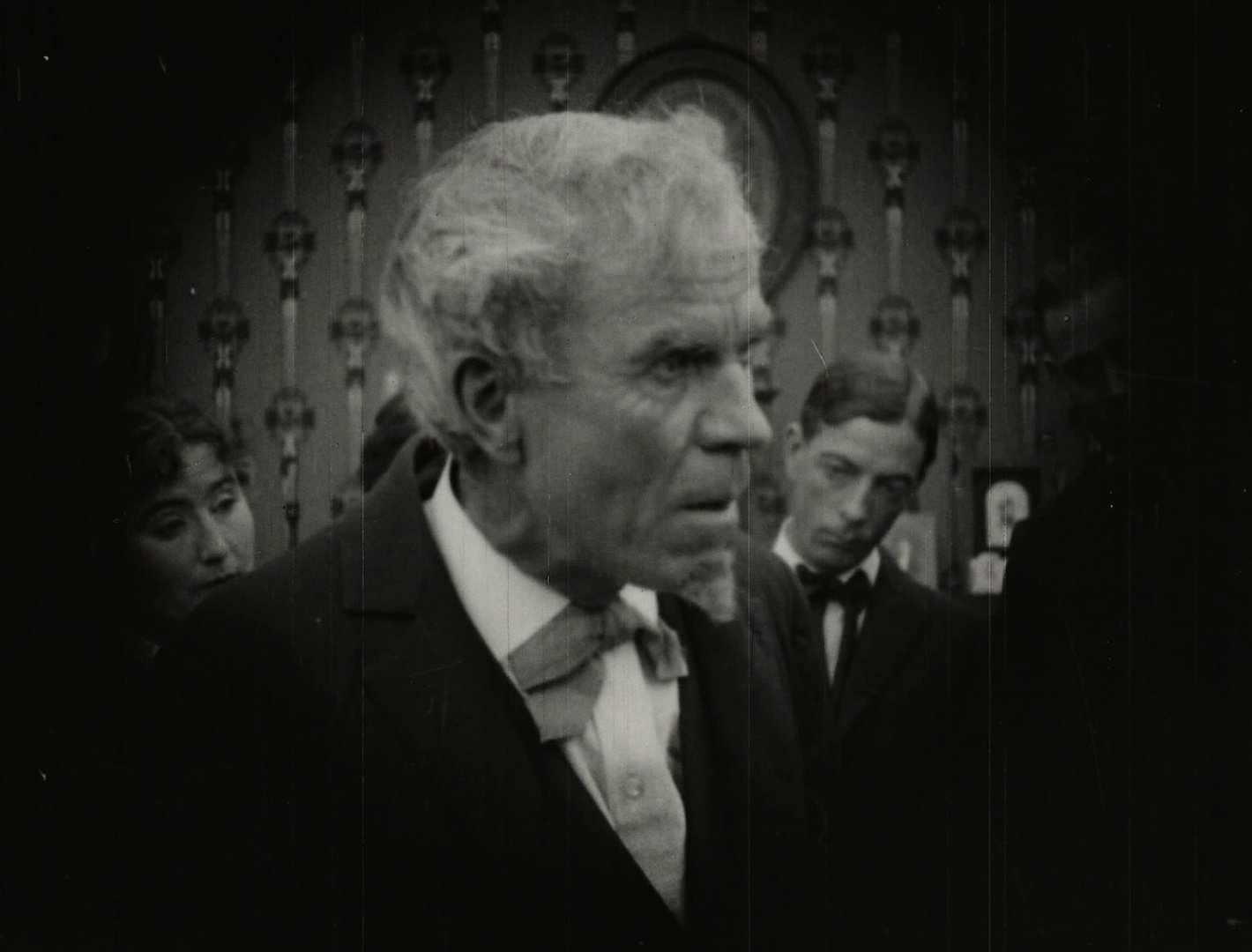
- Willis Marks in Her Defiance (1916)
- Born: August 20, 1865; Rochester, Minnesota
- Died: December 6, 1952; Los Angeles, California
- Occupation: Actor

Willis Marks (August 20, 1865, Rochester, Minnesota, United States – December 6, 1952, Los Angeles, California) was an American silent film actor.

== Biography ==
In 1888, Marks debuted on stage professionally. He acted in Oliver Morosco's stock company for nine years. He went to Hollywood in 1915, and for 20 years he portrayed older men in many films, including The Dramatic Life of Abraham Lincoln (1924), in which he played William Seward. Marks' career declined after the emergence of sound movies.

Marks was married to actress Carroll Marshall. His son, Chandler Marks, was also an actor.

Marks' papers are housed at the University of Denver.

== Partial filmography ==
- Secret Love (1916)
- Her Defiance (1916)
- Her Bitter Cup (1916)
- The Mysterious Mrs. M (1917)
- The Clock (1917)
- The Vanity Pool (1918)
- The Flash of Fate (1918)
- You Never Saw Such a Girl (1919)
- The Man from Funeral Range (1919)
- When a Girl Loves (1919)
- The Wishing Ring Man (1919)
- Greased Lightning (1919)
- The Virtuous Thief (1919)
- The Trembling Hour (1919)
- Over the Garden Wall (1919)
- The Family Honor (1920)
- The Dancin' Fool (1920)
- The Jack-Knife Man (1920)
- Homespun Folks (1920)
- The Little Grey Mouse (1920)
- The Beautiful Gambler (1921)
- Chickens (1921)
- The Greater Profit (1921)
- Travelin' On (1922)
- Man Under Cover (1922)
- Truxton King (1923)
- Which Shall It Be? (1924)
- His Forgotten Wife (1924)
- The Dramatic Life of Abraham Lincoln (1924)
- The Shadow on the Wall (1925)
- Shattered Lives (1925)
- The Night Ship (1925)
- Silent Pal (1925)
- Private Affairs (1925)
- The Unknown Soldier (1926)
- Rebecca of Sunnybrook Farm (1932)
