= The Great Radium Mystery =

1919 film

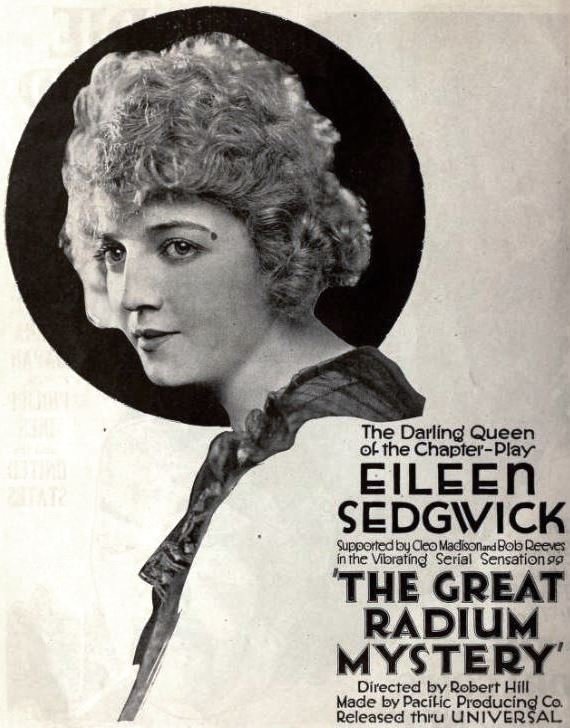
- Trade advertisement
- Directed by: Robert Broadwell; Robert F. Hill
- Written by: Frederick Bennett
- Starring: Cleo Madison; Bob Reeves
- Distributed by: Universal Film Manufacturing Co.
- Release date: October 13, 1919
- Running time: 18 episodes
- Country: United States
- Language: Silent (English intertitles)

The Great Radium Mystery is a 1919 American silent adventure film serial directed by Robert Broadwell and Robert F. Hill. This serial is now considered a lost film.

== Cast ==
- Cleo Madison as Countess Nada
- Bob Reeves as Jack Turner (credited as Robert Reeves)
- Eileen Sedgwick as Gloria Marston
- Bob Kortman as "The Buzzard"
- Ed Brady as Frank Bird
- Jefferson Osborne as John Marston (credited as Jeff Osborne)
- Robert Gray as "The Hawk"
- Gordon McGregor as "The Rat"
- Fred Hamer

== Chapter titles ==
1. The Mystic Stone
2. The Death Trap
3. The Fatal Ride
4. The Swing for Life
5. The Torture Chamber
6. The Tunnel of Doom
7. A Flash in the Dark
8. In the Clutches of a Mad Man
9. The Roaring Volcano
10. Creeping Flames
11. Perils of Doom
12. Shackled
13. The Scalding Pit
14. Hemmed In
15. The Flaming Arrow
16. Over the Cataract
17. The Wheels of Death
18. Liquid Flames

== See also ==
- List of film serials
- List of film serials by studio
- List of lost films
