= Discontented Husbands =

1924 film by Edward LeSaint

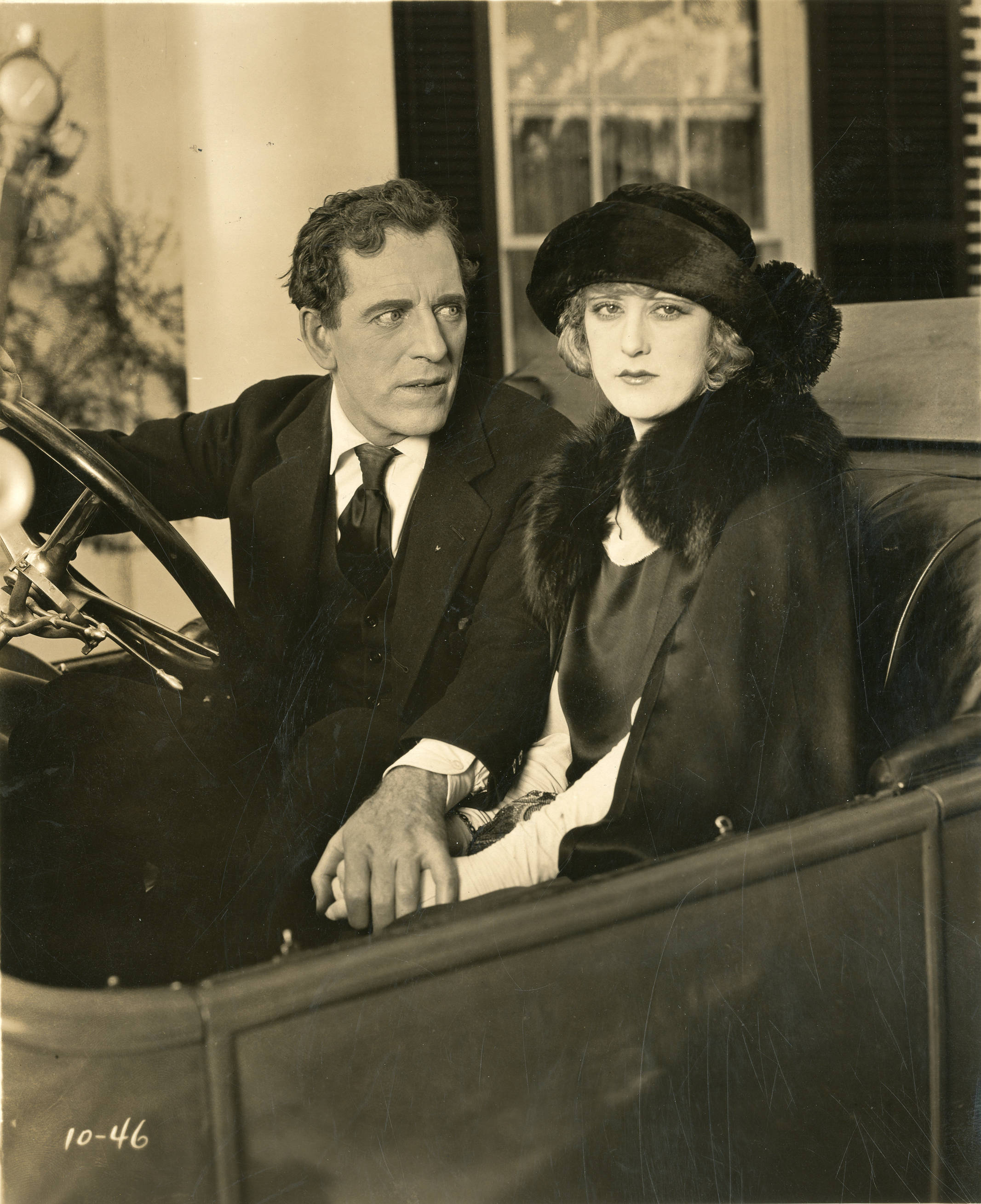
- Film still
- Directed by: Edward LeSaint
- Story by: Evelyn Campbell
- Produced by: Harry Cohn
- Starring: James Kirkwood; Cleo Madison; Grace Darmond
- Production company: Columbia Pictures
- Distributed by: Columbia Pictures
- Release date: January 15, 1924
- Running time: 58 minutes
- Country: United States
- Language: Silent (English intertitles)

Discontented Husbands is a 1924 American silent drama film directed by Edward LeSaint and written by Evelyn Campbell that was released by Columbia Pictures. The film stars James Kirkwood, Cleo Madison, and Grace Darmond. The film was released on January 15, 1924.

== Plot ==
As described in a film magazine review, Michael Frazer, who has made several million dollars through the invention of a patent can opener, aspires to rise in society. However, his wife Jane is old fashioned and does not wish to make this climb. During a dinner party Jane keeps calling her husband "Mike" to his annoyance and lowers the chance of any social ambition when she refers to the cost of a table cover. Michael plans to have his estate transformed into a beauty garden and seeks bids for the work. Emily Ballard, whose husband Jack is a landscape artist, strikes up a friendship with Michael in order to secure the work for her husband. The friendship ripens and they make plans to run away together. Jack learns of this and, to teach Michael a lesson, plans to run off with their daughter Marcia. An automobile wreck where the machine rolls down an embankment and lands upside down spoils all plans and the families are reunited.

== Cast ==
- James Kirkwood as Michael Frazer
- Cleo Madison as Jane Frazer
- Grace Darmond as Emily Ballard
- Arthur Rankin as Dick Everton
- Vernon Steele as Jack Ballard
- Carmelita Geraghty as Marcia Frazer
- Muriel McCormac as Baby Ballard

== Preservation ==
With no prints of Discontented Husbands located in any film archives, it is now considered to be a lost film.
