= Joe Moore (actor) =

American actor

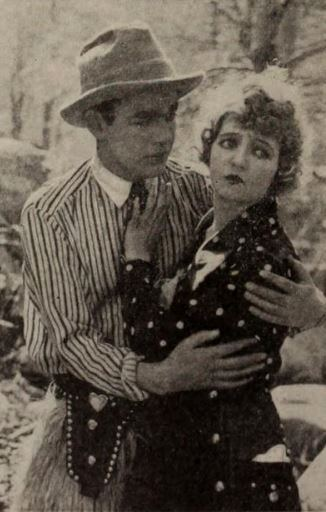
- Joe Moore and Eileen Sedgwick in The White Rider (1920)
- Born: November 22, 1894; Fordstown Crossroads, County Meath, Ireland
- Died: August 22, 1926 (aged 31); Santa Monica, California, U.S.
- Occupation: Actor
- Years active: 1911–1926
- Spouse: Grace Cunard (m. 1917; div. 1925)
- Relatives: Brothers: Tom, Owen, and Matt Moore

Joe Moore (22 November 1894 – 22 August 1926) was an Irish-born American film actor.

== Biography ==
Moore appeared in 13 films between 1914 until 1926. His brothers were also actors: Tom Moore, Owen Moore, and Matt Moore.

He was born in Fordstown Crossroads, County Meath, Ireland. He drowned after suffering a heart attack while swimming off the coast of Santa Monica, California, in 1926, at the age of 31.

== Partial filmography ==
- The Staff of Age (1912)
- Goat Getter (1925)
