= Ruth Helen Davis =

American writer

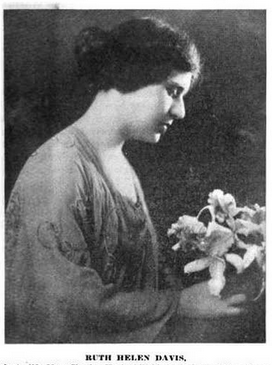
- from a 1922 publication
- Born: New York, New York, U.S.
- Died: August 20, 1937; New York, New York, U.S.
- Occupations: Writer, translator, critic, playwright, actress, theatrical producer, editor

Ruth Helen Davis (died August 20, 1937) was an American writer, playwright, dramatic reader, theatrical producer, and translator. She wrote several books and plays, was a contributing editor for The Musical Monitor, and was founder of the Play Producing Society of New York.

== Early life and education ==
Davis was born in New York City. She earned a degree and a teaching certificate from Hunter College as a young woman, and briefly taught on the Lower East Side.

== Career ==
=== New York years ===
Davis performed dramatic readings, sometimes in costume, and sometimes with Mary Warfel accompanying her on harp. Her collaborator Ella Wheeler Wilcox wrote in 1918, "I have never encountered another human being who possessed so much ambition for achievement and so much energy and determination to succeed as Ruth Helen Davis."

She translated a French play as The Guilty Man; it was produced as a play in 1916, then as a film in 1918. In 1922, Davis was drama editor of The Musical Monitor, and she performed at a benefit for the Arthur Home for Blind Babies. She was founder of the Play Producing Society of New York, organized to produce plays by new American writers.

=== Los Angeles years ===
Davis moved to Los Angeles in the 1920s, and founded the Fine Arts Forum there; the Forum organized summer performances of Shakespeare, ballet, and classical music in Hollywood. In 1926 she acted in a historical play with Frederick Warde at the Criterion Theater, on the same program as silent films. In 1927, she and her husband leased the Belmont Theater in Los Angeles and began producing plays with a company of "permanent resident players". Lillian Leighton, Franklin Pangborn, C. Montague Shaw, Tudor Owen, and Mia Marvin appeared in productions at Davis's theatre. In 1928, she opened a drama school at the same location.

In 1933 Davis gave a reading of her poetry at the Hollywood Bowl, during a food drive and the annual procession of lilies for Easter. 1934, she was vice president of the Children's Stage and Screen League of Los Angeles. Also in 1934, she received the Palme Académique from the French government for her translation work, and she was head of the drama division of the California Competitive Festival of the Allied Arts.

== Works ==
=== Plays ===
- The Guilty Man (1916, adapted with Charles Klein)
- The Supreme Victory (1916, with Ella Wheeler Wilcox)
- Yesterday and Today (1920, with Ella Wheeler Wilcox)
- I'm Sitting Pretty (1927)
- Amor Verito (1936, with Claude Lapham)

=== Translations from French ===
- François Coppée, Le coupable (1911, as The Guilty Man)
- Henry Bordeaux, La robe de laine (1912, as The Woollen Dress)
- Henry Bordeaux, La peur de vivre (1913, as Fear of Living)
- Henry Bordeaux, Les Yeux qui s’ouvrent (1914, as The Awakening)
- Pierre Loti, La fille du ciel (1912, as The Daughter of Heaven)

== Personal life ==
In 1919, Davis married pioneering radiologist Charles Harvey Archibald, and was stepmother to his daughters Gladys and Vera. The Archibalds attended an international suffrage conference in London in 1921. Her husband died in 1936. She died in 1937, when she fell from a window at the Hotel Astor in New York City.
