= The Heart of a Cracksman =

- Directed by: Wallace Reid; Willis Roberts
- Written by: Wallace Reid
- Produced by: Pat Powers Picture Plays
- Starring: Wallace Reid; Cleo Madison
- Distributed by: Universal Film Manufacturing Company
- Release date: November 7, 1913
- Running time: short
- Country: USA
- Language: Silent..English titles

The Heart of a Cracksman is a 1913 silent film short directed by Wallace Reid and Willis Roberts and starring Reid and Cleo Madison. It was produced by Powers Pictures and distributed by Universal Film Manufacturing Company.

== Cast ==
- Wallace Reid - Gentleman Crook
- Cleo Madison - Marcia, Carlton's Niece
- James Neill - Carlton
- Ed Brady - Carlton's son
- Marcia Moore - Carlton's Daughter-in-Law
