= Three Bad Men and a Girl =

1915 film

- Directed by: Francis Ford
- Written by: Grace Cunard
- Production company: 101-Bison
- Distributed by: Universal Film Manufacturing Company
- Release date: February 20, 1915
- Running time: 20 minutes
- Country: United States

Three Bad Men and a Girl is a 1915 American silent Western black and white film directed by Francis Ford and written by Grace Cunard. This film is reminiscent of The Desert Breed (1915).

== Cast ==
- Francis Ford as Joe
- Jack Ford as Jim
- Major Paleolagus as Shorty
- Grace Cunard as Grace
- Lewis Short as Sheriff
- E.J. Denecke as Sheriff's Assistant
