= Ray Hanford =

American actor (1887–1939)

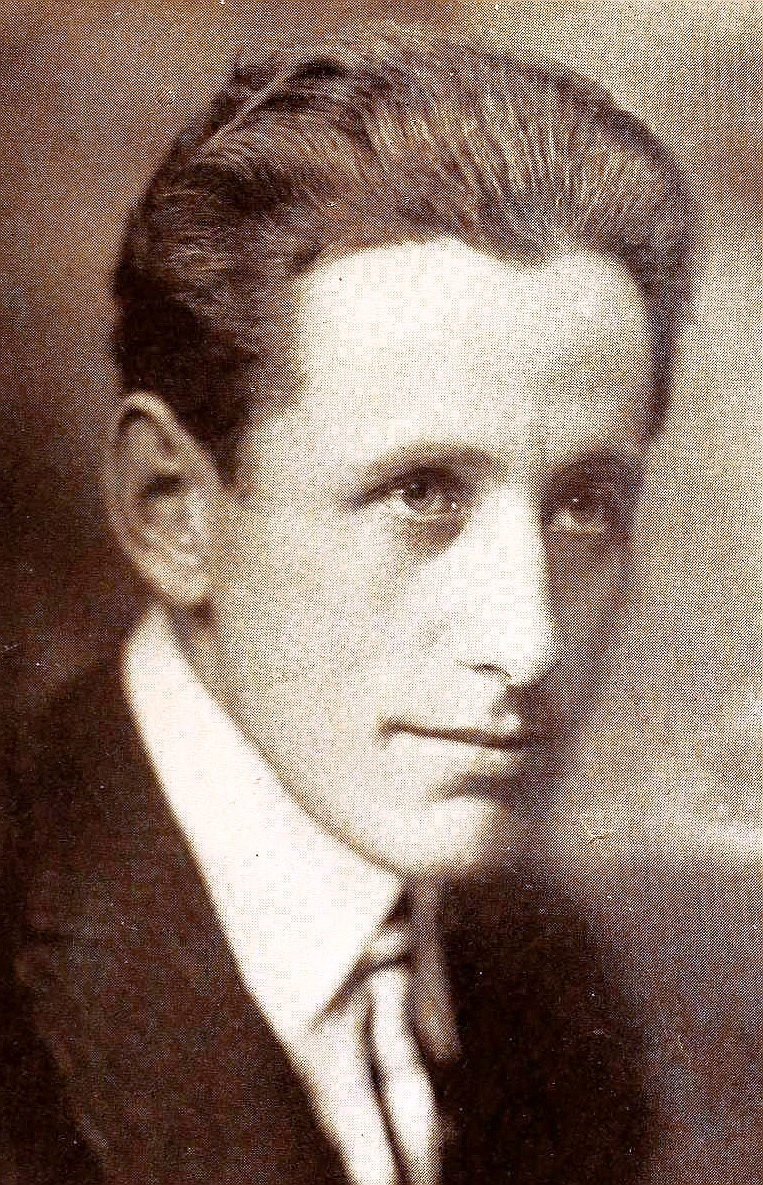
- Hanford in or before 1922
- Born: Raymond Francis Finigan; September 16, 1887; Oakland, California, U.S.
- Died: March 30, 1939 (aged 51); Los Angeles, California, U.S.
- Occupation: Actor
- Years active: c. 1911–1938
- Spouse: Anita Gibson (m. 1920; div. 1922)

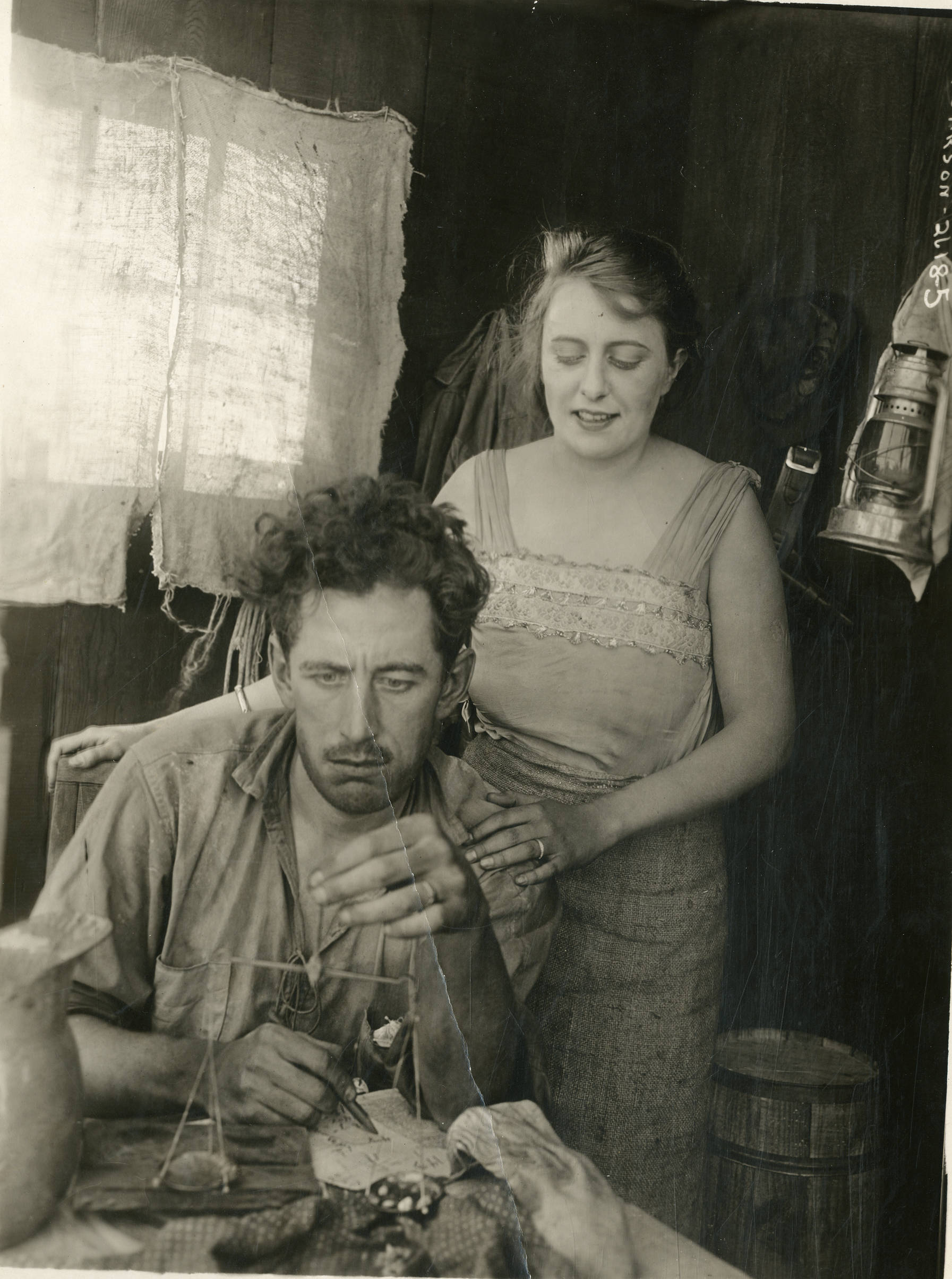
Hanford on the set of Hell's Crater (1918) with Grace Cunard

Raymond Francis Finigan (Note: Some contemporary sources spell his last name as "Finnigan" or "Finnegan". He has also been referred to as "Ray Hanford Finigan".) (September 16, 1887 – March 30, 1939), better known by his stage name Ray Hanford, was an American character actor active from the 1910s to 1930s.

== Biography ==
Hanford was born on September 16, 1887, in Oakland, California. His earliest documented roles were in stage plays in 1911 and 1912.

In August 1914, while on a trip to San Diego to star in The Trey o' Hearts, Hanford rescued a boy who fell from a forty-foot cliff. A month later, Hanford was nearly killed during a controlled landslide on the set of the same film.

Hanford died of bronchopneumonia on March 30, 1939, in Los Angeles, California. He was 51 years old.

=== Scandals ===
In April 1920, Hanford married an Oakland singer-socialite named Anita Gibson. Within the first year of their marriage, Gibson allegedly had affairs with Frederick B. Warren, a multimillionaire who was president of the American Releasing Corporation, and William Harrison Clem, a wealthy oilman. After launching an investigation into the activities of his wife, she filed for divorce on the grounds of cruelty, claiming that he was physically and verbally abusive and that he was once arrested after a "wild orgy" was held at their home. During the divorce, Gibson sued for their property valued at $60,000 (equivalent to $1,200,000 in 2025), while Hanford filed a counter-complaint regarding her infidelity. As Hanford did not appear in court, Gibson was granted a divorce and ownership of their property in December 1922. One year later, Gibson married Clem.

In September 1930, Hanford accidentally shot a man named Douglass Kendall during a bet at a Hollywood party. Kendall's injuries were minor, and he refused to press charges.

== Selected filmography ==
- The Trey o' Hearts (1914)
- Behind the Lines (1916)
- Her Bitter Cup (1916)
- The Beckoning Trail (1916)
- The Silent Battle (1916)
- The Bull's Eye (1917)
- The Price of Silence (1917)
- Desert Law (1918)
- Hell's Crater (1918)
- The Lion's Claws (1918)
- Mary of the Movies (1923)
- Wolf Blood (1925)
- Sir Lumberjack (1926)
