= The Bull's Eye (serial) =

1917 film

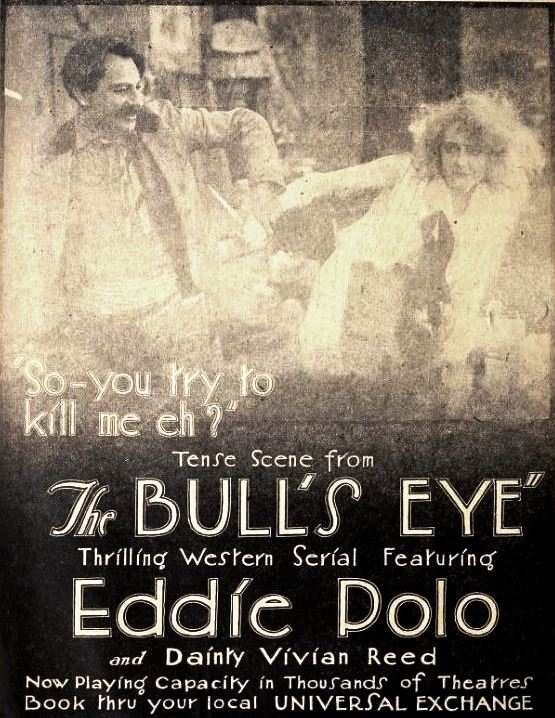
- Advertisement for film serial
- Directed by: James W. Horne
- Written by: Frank Howard Clark; Harvey Gates; Tom Gibson; James W. Horne; Henry MacRae; Blaine Pearson
- Starring: Eddie Polo; Vivian Reed
- Cinematography: Al Cawood
- Distributed by: Universal Film Manufacturing Co.
- Release date: December 13, 1917
- Running time: 18 episodes
- Country: United States
- Language: Silent (English intertitles)

The Bull's Eye is a 1917 American film serial directed by James W. Horne. It is now considered to be a lost film.

== Cast ==
- Eddie Polo as Cody
- Vivian Reed as Cora Clayton
- Frank Lanning as Nathan Loose
- Ray Hanford as John Clayton
- William Welsh as John North
- Hallam Cooley as Lee McGuire
- Noble Johnson as Sweeney Bodin
- Leo Willis

== Chapter titles ==
1. First Blood
2. The Fearless One
3. Desperate Odds
4. Still In The Ring
5. The Swing of Death
6. On The Brink
7. Riding Wild
8. Dynamite
9. The Flaming Crisis
10. Coyotes of The Desert
11. Fired
12. Burning Sands
13. Sold At Auction
14. The Firing Squad
15. The Stained Face
16. Running Wild
17. In Irons
18. The Runaway

== Reception ==
Like many American films of the time, The Bull's Eye was subject to cuts by city and state film censorship boards. For example, the Chicago Board of Censors required the following cuts by chapter:

- Chapter 1, Reel 1, of the shooting of man from horse, Reel 2, all holdup scenes, flagging train and attack on crew and passengers, all scenes in fight between sheepmen and Cody where guns are drawn, two scenes of sheepmen shooting at crowd on rear platform of train, and the choking of Cody on trailer at end of reel;
- Chapter 2, Reel 1, of sheepmen shooting at passengers on the train, pulling man off horse by his hair, knocking down half unconscious man, kicking prostrate man, two shooting scenes in which men fall, three scenes of cattle rustlers shooting at Cody, Reel 2, shooting John Clayton and his falling, binding man to tree, Sweeney suggestively leering at young woman, all scenes of her struggling in man's arms, and the man carrying her off;
- Chapter 3, Reel 1, two scenes of man carrying young woman to cabin, man carrying her into cabin, man barricading door on self and young woman, choking young woman, two scenes of her laying across table, two intertitles "Sweeney's no better than we are" etc. and "Sweeney, you're no better than we are" etc., Sweeney shooting man outside cabin, nine scenes of men shooting at couple in cabin, four fight scenes between men in cabin, Reel 2, sheepmen entering Clayton's home through window, five scenes of holdup and abduction of Clayton except the scene of taking him from house, seven scenes of chase after Cody in which men shoot at him, and three scenes of rustlers shooting at Cody in cabin;
- Chapter 4, Reel 1, eight scenes of shooting at cabin harboring Cody, Reel 2, the attack on sheepman's gate and two scenes of cattle rustling;
- Chapter 5, two scenes of men outside window shooting at Cody, intertitle "Say the word, boss, and we'll hang him", all but first two and last two shooting scenes to include two scenes of men falling, Reel 2, two scenes of man holding gun to Clayton's side, four shooting scenes between sheepman and cowboy to include men falling, shooting man during truce between sheepman and cowboys, first three choking scenes between Cody and Johnson, Nathan Loose falling and scene of covering dead man's face with handkerchief in battle between sheepmen and cattlemen, first struggle scene between man and young woman in which she breaks away and is carried to other side, and struggle scene in which man puts hand over her mouth;
- Chapter 6, Reel 1, choking man on edge of cliff, striking man on head with gun, pushing Cody over cliff, the three intertitles "Say the word and he swings", "You forget what he has done", and "You're not going to hang me. Give me one more chance", all scenes of cattlemen preparing to lynch Sweeney to include putting rope around his neck, all scenes of Sweeney pleading for his life, Reel 2, attack on man guarding Sweeney, abduction of young woman in garden, gagging her, and the two intertitles "Sweeney's brutal desires were not to be easily thwarted" and "There'll be no one to plead for him now, because I'll shoot straight";
- Chapter 7, Reel 1, closeup of North shooting at Cody, young woman breaking away from Sweeney and Sweeney carrying her back, Cody shooting man from horse, two coach holdup scenes including shooting of man, third holdup scene in which Sweeney drives away, two scenes of Sweeney on coach shooting back at Cody, the intertitle "For his own brutal desires" etc., Reel 2, two scenes of Sweeney holding up engineer, Sweeney shooting Cody in cab of train engine, cowboys flagging train, assault on trainman at station, two scenes of holdup of train crew, two scenes of Sweeney knocking down trainman on top of car, three scenes of Sweeney shooting at Cody on top of train, and Cody shooting back;
- Chapter 8, Reel 1, striking Cody with butt of gun, shooting and man falling at railroad station, four scenes of lassoing and dragging man, Reel 2, throwing man over cliff and the binding of Cody;
- Chapter 9, Reel 1, all but five scenes of burning rope, five fight scenes, three scenes of gang shooting, Reel 2, all scenes of man with dynamite near bridge, man lighting fuse, and seven scenes of outlaw gang shooting;
- Chapter 10, Reel 1, shooting man and man falling, three scenes of threatening man with guns, and, Reel 2, arranging and lighting fuse;
- Chapter 11, Reel 1, the intertitle "Here's $1,000 — it is yours if you cut the rope", man shooting at rope, two scenes of Sweeney holding up men in office, Sweeney shooting man in office, Norton shooting man in office, Sweeney pouring oil over room, Reel 2, three scenes of old man at bar pointing gun at man, old man shooting in saloon, five saloon fight scenes.
- Chapter 13, Reel 1, the intertitle "Hands off — she belongs to North and me", Reel 2, two intertitles "No, Senor, American girls are scarce at Fendez — she'll bring big money" and "We'll sell her to the highest bidder", seven scenes of young woman standing on auction table, three closeups of Mexicans suggestively leering at young woman, last five struggle scenes between young woman and Mexican to include two scenes of choking her on table, entire scene of young woman unconscious on floor to include man closing door on group of women;
- Chapter 14, Reel 1, two intertitles "The girl was sold by her captors to the highest bidder" and "Juanita the favorite until Cora came", scenes of young woman on floor in room, young woman arising from floor after man comes in room, all but first struggle scene between man and young woman, closeup of Cody choking Mexican across table, Cody stabbing jailer in prison cell, five scenes of Mexicans playing dice for young woman, striking guard on head outside room, three scenes of men falling after Cody shoots, and two intertitles "We must decide who gets the girl" and "Now we'll watch your friend breath his last";
- Chapter 15, Reel 1, Cody slugging Mexican guard, Reel 2, two shooting scenes with men falling, three scenes of dead bodies on floor, throwing body into well, man cutting rope leading to well, and shooting at Cody in well;
- Chapter 16, Reel 1, last four shooting scenes between bandits and posse in which men fall, Reel 2, three closeups of battering door with pole, passing bundle to prisoner, prisoner sawing prison bars, attack on Cody, three scenes of threatening Cody with gun, flash three fight scenes between Cody and bandits, the intertitle "I'll tickle him a little with a couple of shots", two scenes of Sweeney shooting at Cody. and Cody bound to horse falling down mountainside;
- Chapter 17, Reel 1, Sweeney shooting at Cody, two near views of Mexican throwing knife at tree to which man is bound, Reel 2, knocking down man, slugging McGuire, placing Cody on tracks, all but first and last scene of Cody bound to tracks; and
- Chapter 18, Reel 1, all scenes of train and men holdup, Sweeney shooting and man falling, North slugging Cody, four holdup scenes by Mexican, three scenes of Mexican shooting and man falling, two scenes of forcing engineer to start engine, Sweeney slugging engineer, three scenes of rigging chair with gun, one scene of demonstration of chair and gun and following scene, Reel 2, three views of chair and gun, holdup of North, two scenes of Sweeney shooting North, robbing North, and two scenes of Sweeney shooting at pursuers.

== See also ==
- List of American films of 1917
- List of film serials
- List of film serials by studio
