= The Price of Redemption =

1920 film directed by Dallas M. Fitzgerald

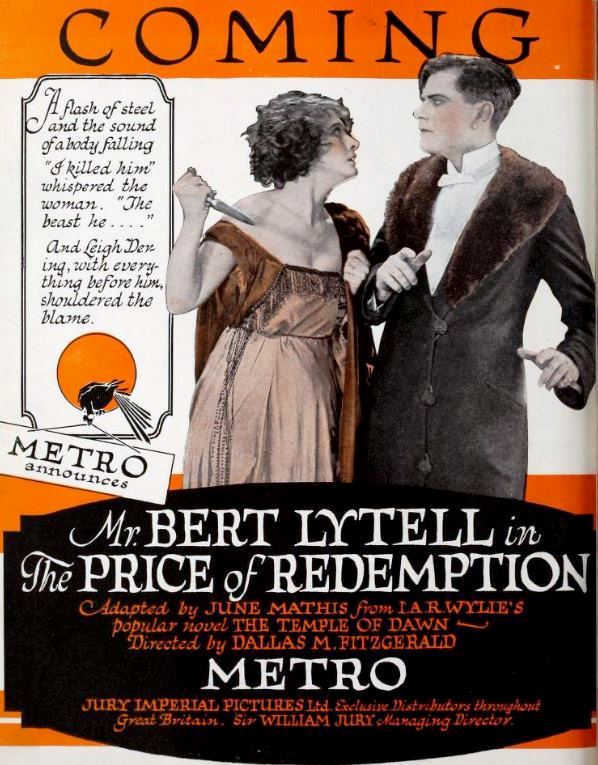
- Directed by: Dallas M. Fitzgerald
- Written by: I.A.R. Wylie (novel); June Mathis
- Starring: Bert Lytell; Seena Owen; Cleo Madison
- Cinematography: Sol Polito
- Production company: Metro Pictures
- Distributed by: Metro Pictures
- Release date: September 13, 1920
- Running time: 6 reels
- Country: United States
- Language: Silent (English intertitles)

The Price of Redemption is a lost 1920 American silent crime film directed by Dallas M. Fitzgerald and starring Bert Lytell, Seena Owen and Cleo Madison.

== Cast ==
- Bert Lytell as Leigh Dering
- Seena Owen as Jean Dering
- Cleo Madison as Anne Steel
- Landers Stevens as Richard Willoughby
- Edward Cecil as Govind Singh, the Rajah
- Arthur Morrison as Colonel Desmond
- Wilbur Higby as Colonel Dering
- Michael D. Moore as Billy
- Rose Marie de Courelle as Ayah

== Bibliography ==
- Monaco, James. The Encyclopedia of Film. Perigee Books, 1991.
