= Which Shall It Be? =

1924 silent film

- Directed by: Renaud Hoffman
- Written by: Alfred A. Cohn; Frank Condon
- Produced by: Madeline Brandeis; Renaud Hoffman
- Starring: Willis Marks; Ethel Wales; David Torrence
- Cinematography: Renaud Hoffman
- Production company: Renaud Hoffman Productions
- Distributed by: Hodkinson Distribution
- Release date: June 15, 1924
- Running time: 50 minutes
- Country: United States
- Language: Silent (English intertitles)

Which Shall It Be? is a 1924 American silent drama film directed by Renaud Hoffman and starring Willis Marks, Ethel Wales, and David Torrence.

== Plot ==
As described in a film magazine review, John Moore and his wife are hard-working parents of six, struggling from morn till night in a valiant effort to give their children all the necessities of life. It is a herculean task, and when they receive an offer from a wealthy relative, of ease and physical comfort for the rest of their lives in exchange for one of the children, they decide to accept. However, they are stopped by the thought of which child to give up to their relative. After much speculation and conflicting thought, they decide on the oldest girl. She no sooner takes leave than the mother suffers terrible remorse. Just when it seems as though her heart must break, the daughter appears and flies to her mother's arms. The father, who had driven her off in his buggy, simply could not, as it turned out, "say good-bye," and the happy family is reunited once more.

== Cast ==
- Willis Marks as John Moore
- Ethel Wales as Mrs. Moore
- David Torrence as Robert Moore
- Paul Weigel as Musicmaster
- Mary McLain as Moore Child
- Billy Boudwin as Moore Child
- Newton House as Moore Child
- Miriam Bellah as Moore Child
- Dick Winslow as Moore Child
- Buck Black as Moore Child
- Thayer Strain as Moore Child

== Bibliography ==
- Munden, Kenneth White. The American Film Institute Catalog of Motion Pictures Produced in the United States, Part 1. University of California Press, 1997.
