= The Guilty Man =

- Directed by: Irvin Willat
- Based on: The Guilty Man by Charles Klein
- Starring: William Garwood; Vivian Reed; Gloria Hope
- Distributed by: Famous Players–Lasky Corporation; Paramount Pictures
- Release date: February 18, 1918
- Running time: 5 reels
- Country: United States
- Language: Silent (English intertitles)

The Guilty Man is a lost 1918 American silent drama film directed by Irvin Willat and starring William Garwood, Vivian Reed, and Gloria Hope. The film was based on a play of the same name by Ruth Helen Davis and Charles Klein.

== Plot ==
As described in a film magazine, Marie Dubois, deserted by her lover before the birth of her child, marries Flambon, who is cruel and heartless. When her daughter Claudine reaches womanhood, Flambon forces her to sing in his cafe and then endeavors her to marry one of his creditors. Marie interferes and Flambon takes hold of her by the throat. Claudine, fearing for her mother's safety, kills him. She is arrested and taken before the grand prosecutor, who discovers that Claudine is really his own child. During the trial he enforces the same rigidity which have characterized his other trials, but in the end confesses that he is the girl's father, resigns his position, and places himself at the mercy of the public. He is allowed to go free and solemnly promises to make up to his wife and daughter what they have missed.

== Cast ==
- Vivian Reed as Marie Dubois
- Gloria Hope as Claudine Flambon
- William Garwood as Claude Lescuyer
- J.P. Lockney as Lescuyer, Senior
- Charles French as Flambon (credited as Charles French)
- Hal Cooley as Gaston Marceau (credited as Hal Cooley)
- John Steppling as Jean Michaud
- Hayward Mack as Jacques Ristac

== Reception ==
Like many American films of the time, The Guilty Man was subject to cuts by city and state film censorship boards. For example, the Chicago Board of Censors issued the film an Adults Only permit and required cuts of three intertitles "There is something you must do", "I have no right to bring a nameless child into the world", and "I must obey the law — I cannot sanction immorality", and the actual shooting scene.
