= Unmasked (1917 film) =

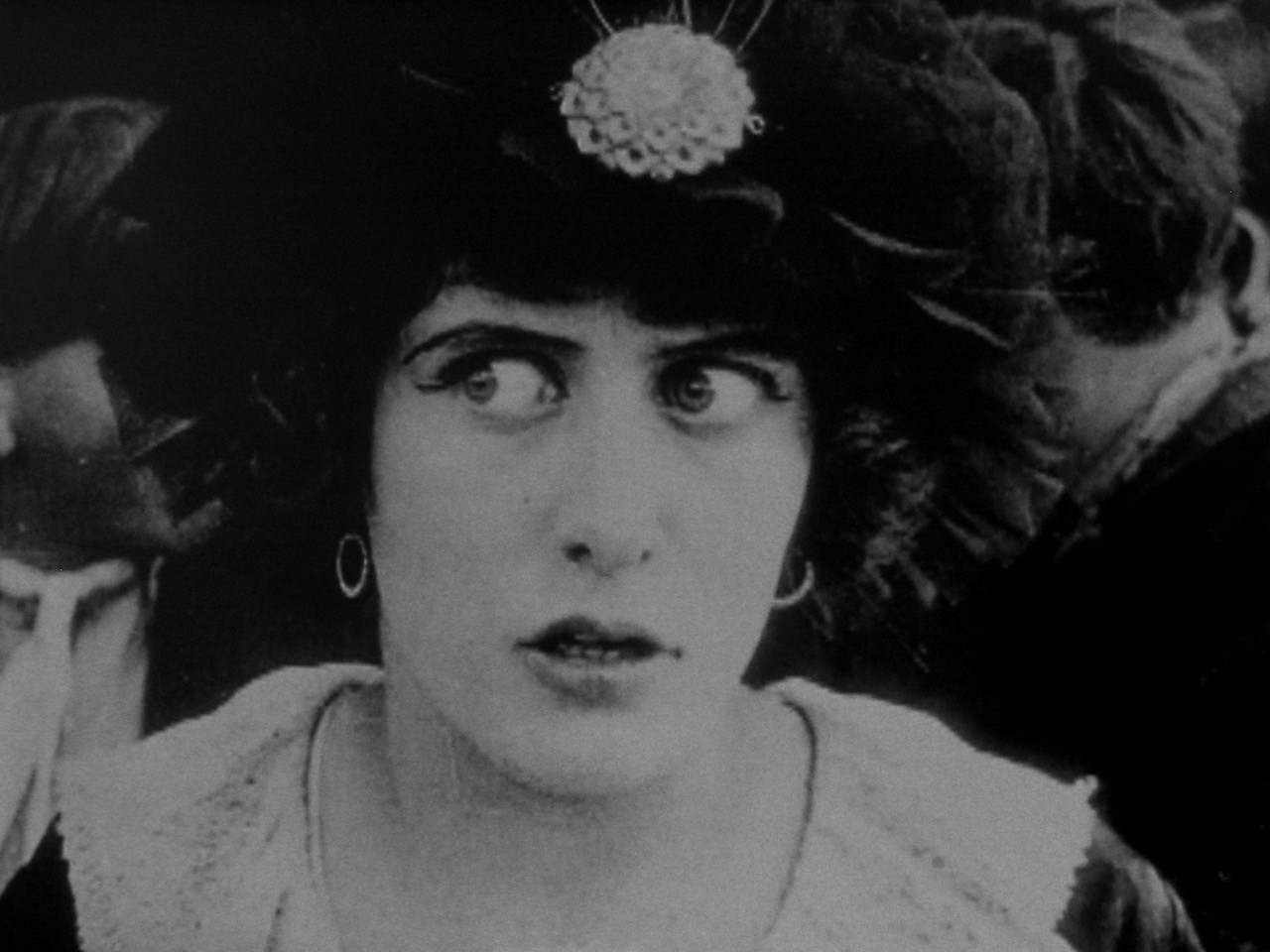
- Close-up shot of Grace Cunard in Unmasked
- Directed by: Grace Cunard; Francis Ford
- Written by: Grace Cunard; Francis Ford
- Produced by: Francis Ford
- Starring: Grace Cunard; Francis Ford
- Production company: Rex Motion Picture Company
- Distributed by: Universal Film Manufacturing Company
- Release date: May 23, 1917
- Running time: 12 minutes
- Country: United States
- Language: English

Unmasked is a 1917 dramatic silent film, one of several successes produced by Grace Cunard and Francis Ford. As was common with other female filmmakers of the time, Cunard co-wrote, co-starred and co-directed the film. A short 35 second clip is available on YouTube.

In 2014, Unmasked was selected for preservation in the United States National Film Registry as "culturally, historically or aesthetically significant".
