= A Soul Enslaved =

1916 silent film directed by Cleo Madison

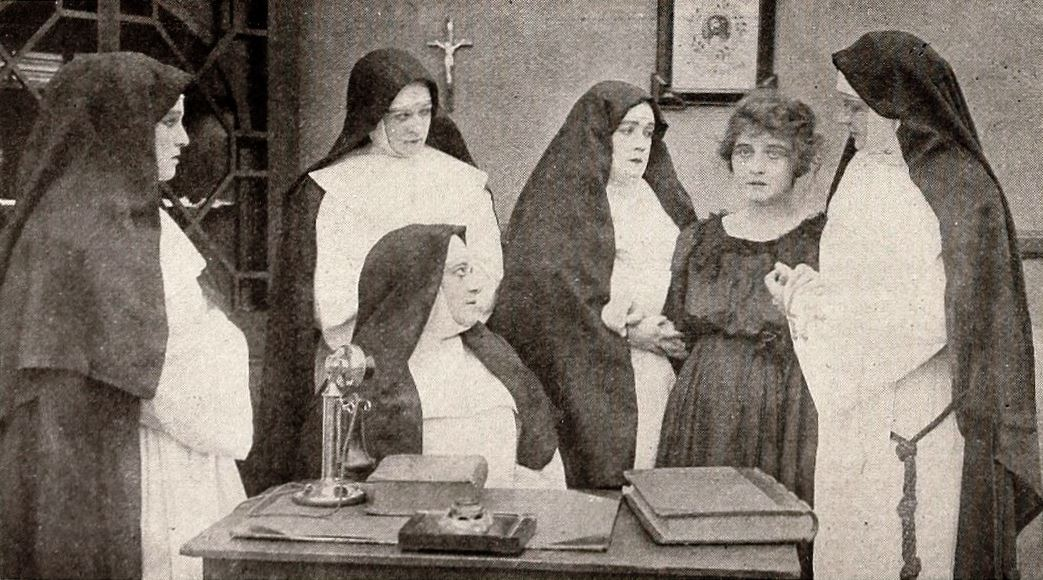
- Film still
- Directed by: Cleo Madison
- Screenplay by: Adele Farrington; Olga Printzlau
- Produced by: Cleo Madison
- Starring: Cleo Madison; Tom Chatterton; Lule Warrenton
- Distributed by: Universal Film Manufacturing Company
- Release date: January 24, 1916 (U.S.)
- Running time: 5 reels
- Country: United States
- Language: Silent (English intertitles)

A Soul Enslaved is a 1916 American silent drama film directed by actress-turned-director (and suffragist) Cleo Madison, and written by screenwriters Adele Farrington and Olga Printzlau. Madison also stars. The Universal film is believed to be lost.

== Plot ==
The film—which explores themes of hypocrisy, double standards, and gender norms—features Madison as an activist fighting for better working conditions at her factory job. Madison's character is having an affair with the factory's owner, and she later moves on and marries a man who is unaware of her past. When he discovers that she was previously a "kept woman," he leaves her, only to return after reflecting that he once seduced and abandoned a young woman who committed suicide.

== Cast ==
- Cleo Madison as Jane
- Tom Chatterton as Richard Newton
- Douglas Gerrard as Paul Kent
- Lule Warrenton as Jane's Mother
- Patricia Palmer as Nellie
- Alfred Allen as Ambrose
- Irma Sorter as Young Jane

== Production ==
The film was Madison's directorial feature debut. Production was delayed by nearly 10 days after Madison was struck in the eye by a fishing hook in a freak accident. The incident nearly cost her her sight in that eye.
