= The Girl from Nowhere (1919 film) =

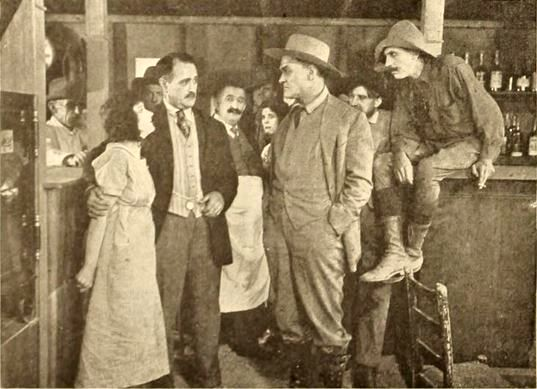
- Still from the film with Cleo Madison and Wilfred Lucas
- Directed by: Wilfred Lucas; Bess Meredyth
- Story by: Bess Meredyth; Wilfred Lucas
- Production company: National Film Corporation of America
- Distributed by: Pioneer Film Corporation
- Release date: September 1919
- Country: United States

The Girl from Nowhere is a 1919 American action adventure drama silent black and white directed and written by Wilfred Lucas and Bess Meredyth and starring Cleo Madison and Frank Brownlee.

== Cast ==
- Cleo Madison as Gal
- Wilfred Lucas as Diamond Terry
- Frank Brownlee as Klondike Jim
- Val Paul as John Waterman
- Mary Talbot as Lizzie Lou
- John Cook as Dr. Ferguson
