= Her Bitter Cup =

1916 film by Cleo Madison

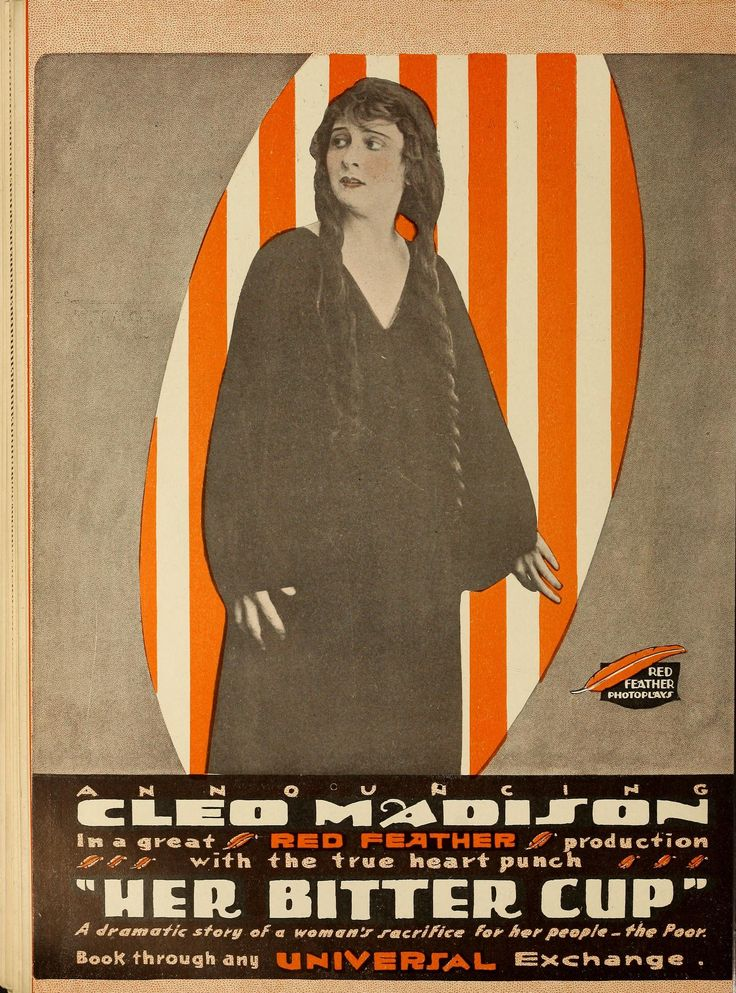
- Directed by: Cleo Madison; Joe King
- Written by: Cleo Madison (scenario)
- Story by: Kathleen Kerrigan
- Produced by: Cleo Madison
- Starring: Cleo Madison; William Mong; Edward Hearn
- Production company: Universal Film Mfg Co
- Release date: April 17, 1916
- Running time: 5 reels
- Country: US

Her Bitter Cup (alternate title A Heart's Crucible) is a 1916 American silent film directed by Cleo Madison. One of only two feature-length films directed by Madison, she also played the leading role, a fervent labor organizer who uses drastic methods to finance her cause of improving the miserable lot of the workers in a factory.

== Synopsis ==
Factory worker Rethna (Madison) comes from an impoverished background. Her raison d'être is to improve the miserable lot of her fellow workers; her chief foe is the cruel factory-owner. Rethna begins a sexual relationship with Henry Burke (William Mong), the owner's disreputable son, and obtains money from him which she funnels to the workers, doing with Burke's money what she believes the Burkes ought to be doing anyway. After a year, she breaks off her relationship with Henry and marries his brother Walter (Edward Hearn), the better man of the two. She continues to support the factory workers with Burke money, and is eventually found out by her husband. Confronted by Walter, who truly loves her, she tells him that she married him only to gain access to his money and avenge the wrongs done by his family; faced with this admission, Walter leaves Rethna.

While Rethna is at the factory pleading with her father-in-law for better working conditions, a fire breaks out. Rethna is badly burned while saving the elder Burke's life, and is herself saved by Walter. During her convalescence she realizes that she loves her husband and the two are reconciled. Because of the fire, Walter's father at last resolves to improve conditions at his factory.

== Cast ==
- Cleo Madison as Rethna
- William Mong as Henry Burke
- Edward Hearn as Walter Burke
- Ray Hanford as Factory foreman
- Adele Farrington as Mary McDougal
- Lule Warrenton as Boardinghouse woman
- Willis Marks

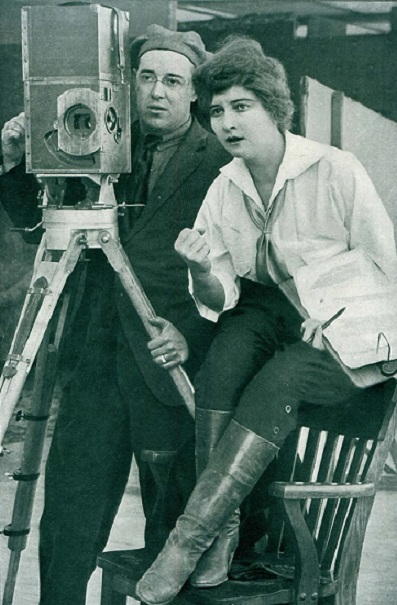
Madison directing Her Bitter Cup

== Production ==
Once Cleo Madison achieved star status at Universal, she lobbied for and was given the chance to direct. (Note: Universal is known for its early female directors; between 1914 and 1919 the studio credited 11 women with directorial duties.) After directing numerous short films in 1915, Madison directed two feature films, the second of which was Her Bitter Cup.

== Reception ==
A contemporary review in the trade paper Motion Picture News gave a mixed opinion of the film, acknowledging Madison's skill and the story overall but expressing confusion about the resolution of the plot. In Moving Picture World, the review also expressed reservations, "The story is quite strong in some respects, but certain features seem to lack proper significance." The review in the New York Clipper was unfavorable and summed up bluntly, "It's so bad it's funny."

== Preservation ==
Her Bitter Cup is currently presumed lost. In February of 2021, the film was cited by the National Film Preservation Board on their Lost U.S. Silent Feature Films list.
