= The Silent Battle =

The Silent Battle may refer to:

- The Silent Battle (1939 film), a British thriller film
- The Silent Battle (1937 film), a French thriller film
- The Silent Battle (1916 film), an American silent drama film
