= Frank Tokunaga =

- Born: Frank B. Tokunaga; Japan
- Occupations: Actor, director, screenwriter
- Spouse: Komako Sunada

Frank B. Tokunaga was a Japanese actor, director, and screenwriter who worked in Japan and Hollywood.

== Biography ==
=== Career ===
Tokunaga began his career in show business in 1912 while managing a troupe of Japanese acrobats for Barnum & Bailey, and later worked as an actor in Broadway productions.

Tokunaga then began working at Thomas H. Ince's motion picture studio in Santa Monica, before taking on roles for Louis B. Mayer and then joining Universal's stock company. He did all sorts of work during the silent era, often serving as an interpreter and a location man.

For a time, Tokunaga returned to Japan, where he was a pioneering writer and director at Nikkatsu Studios. Later on in his career, he would return to the United States sporadically to work as a character actor in Hollywood films.

=== Personal life ===
Tokunaga was married to Komako Sunada, an actress who was known as the Japanese answer to Mary Pickford in the press. (She was born in Japan but raised in Los Angeles.) The pair collaborated on a pair of screenplays: 1925's Tôyô no Karumen and 1926's Zoku Tôyô no Karumen.

== Selected filmography ==
As director:

- Keiba to nyobo (1932)
- Oira no sekai (1932)
- Asu no taiyô (1931)
- Hanamuko hyakumanryô (1931)
- Shonen senshu (1931)
- Kane wa tenka no mawari mochi (1931) (also screenwriter)
- Hikari wa higashiyori (1930)
- Koi no sutoppu mamanranu (1930) (also screenwriter)
- Shisei no kagayaki (1930)
- Taiyo no kokoro (1930)
- Chichi (1929)
- Shuressha (1929)
- Akai hi aoi hi (1929) (also screenwriter)
- Kokoro naki miyako (1927)
- Chiriyuku joka (1926)
- Danshi Tokkan (1926)
- Ganto no nazo (1926)
- Rôchû no uguisu (1926)
- Seigi banzai (1926)
- Zoku Tôyô no Karumen (1926)
- Ai ni kagayaku josei (1925)
- Wakodo no chi wa odoru (1925)
- Shôhin eiga-shû: Jinsei to katsudô (1925)
- Tôyô no Karumen (1925) (also screenwriter)
- Ai no himitsu (1924)

As actor:

- The Big Wave (1961)
- Escapade in Japan (1957)
- The Teahouse of the August Moon (1956)
- Hawai · Maree oki kaisen (1942)
- Zoku Hebihimesama (1940)
- Haru yo izuko (1940)
- Tôjûrô no koi (1938)
- Hakurai tonchinkan (1926)
- Ai no himitsu (1924)
- The Woman He Married (1922)
- The Yellow Typhoon (1920)
- The Fatal Sign (1920)
- The Willow Tree (1920)
- Man of Might (1919)
- The Girl in the Dark (1918)
- Anything Once (1917)
- The Gray Ghost (1917)
- The Flower of Doom (1917)
- The Voice on the Wire (1917)
