= The Social Buccaneer =

The Social Buccaneer may refer to:

- The Social Buccaneer (1916 film)
- The Social Buccaneer (1923 film)
