= The Girl in the Dark =

1918 film directed by Stuart Paton

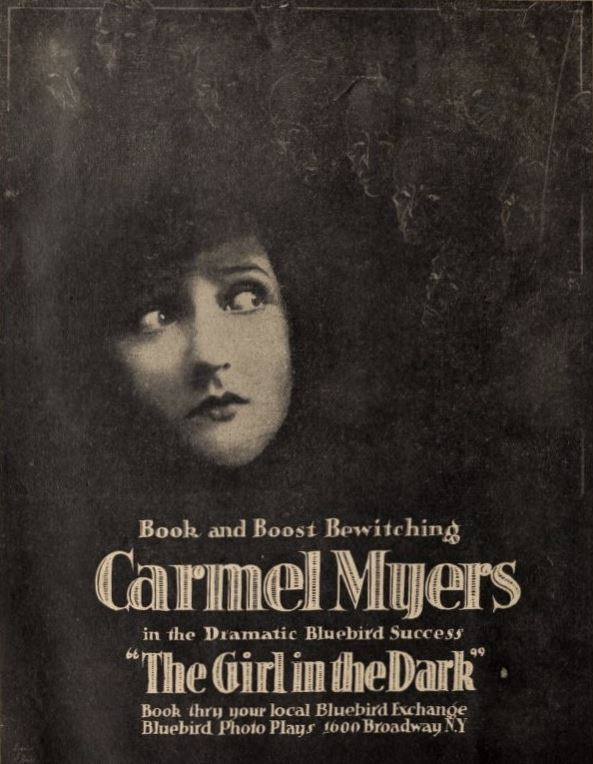
- Trade advertisement
- Directed by: Stuart Paton
- Screenplay by: Albert Kenyon
- Based on: The Green Seal by Charles Edmonds Walk
- Starring: Carmel Myers; Ashton Dearholt; Frank Tokunaga
- Cinematography: Duke Hayward
- Distributed by: Universal Pictures
- Release date: March 4, 1918
- Running time: 5 reels
- Country: United States
- Language: Silent (English intertitles)

The Girl in the Dark is a 1918 American silent mystery film directed by Stuart Paton. The script was written by Albert Kenyon, based on the 1914 novel The Green Seal by Charles Edmonds Walk.

== Plot ==
A young woman named Lois, who was branded with Chinese letters on her shoulder as a baby, finds herself attracting nefarious attention as she grows older.

== Cast ==
- Carmel Myers as Lois Fox
- Ashton Dearholt as Brice Ferris
- Frank Tokunaga as Ming
- Frank Deshon as Lao Wing
- Harry Carter as Strang
- Alfred Allen as Chief of Police Struber
- Betty Schade as Sally

== Preservation ==
With no copies of The Girl in the Dark held in any film archives, it is a lost film.
