= Beloved Jim =

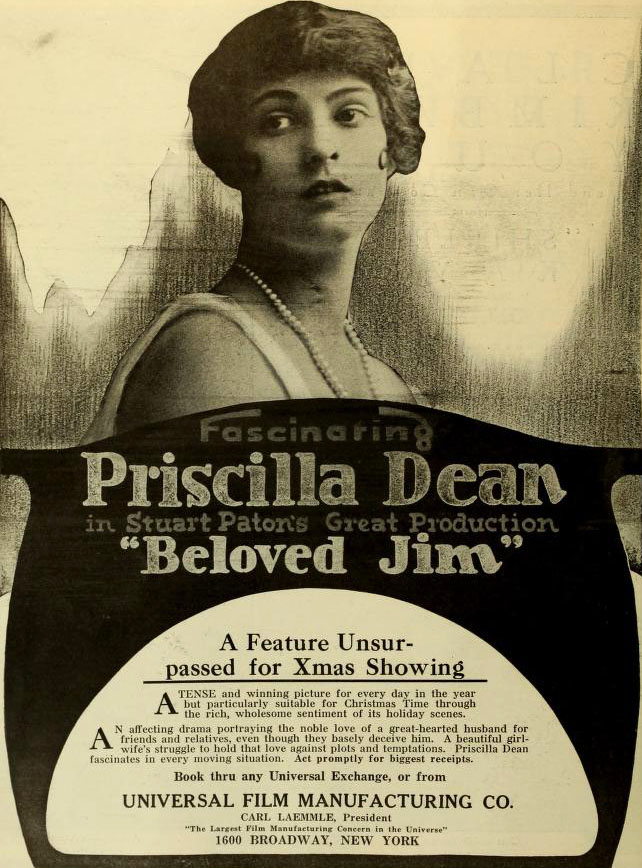
- Contemporary newspaper advertisement.
- Directed by: Stuart Paton
- Written by: Joseph W. Girard
- Produced by: Carl Laemmle
- Starring: Harry Carter; Priscilla Dean
- Cinematography: Duke Hayward
- Distributed by: Universal Film Manufacturing Company
- Release date: December 9, 1917
- Running time: 6 reels
- Country: United States
- Language: Silent (English intertitles)

Beloved Jim is a lost 1917 American silent drama film produced and released by Universal Film Manufacturing Company. It was directed by Stuart Paton and starred Priscilla Dean.

== Cast ==
- Harry Carter as 'Beloved' Jim Brockton
- Priscilla Dean as Mary, His Wife
- J. Morris Foster as Donald, His Nephew
- Charles Hill Mailes as Robert McGregor
- Frank Deshon as Fritz Hahn
- Sydney Deane as Lawrence Darcy
- J. Edwin Brown as The Butler
- Joseph W. Girard as The Derelict
- Mattie Witting as Housekeeper

== Reception ==
Like many American films of the time, Beloved Jim was subject to cuts by city and state film censorship boards. The Chicago Board of Censors cut the four intertitles "My aunt surely picked a good wife", "And then Jim need never know", "You beast, I love Jim" etc., and "He was not man enough to admit defeat, but boasted of his conquest".
