= Claire Anderson (actress) =

American actress

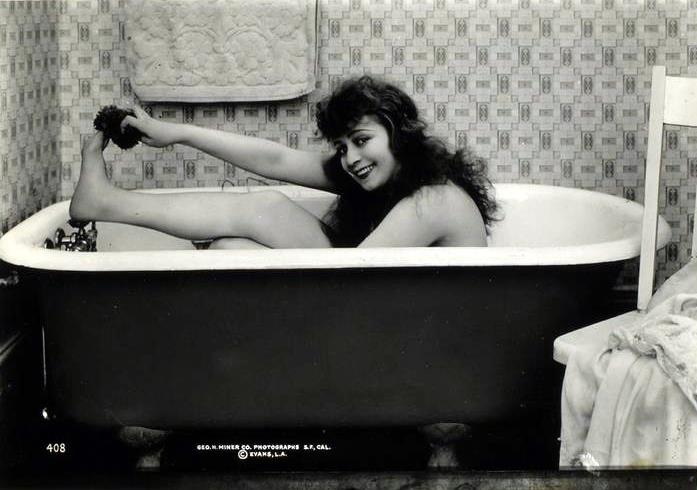
- Born: May 8, 1891; Detroit, Michigan, U.S.
- Died: March 23, 1964 (aged 72)
- Occupation: Actress
- Years active: 1914–1938
- Spouse: Harry H. Anderson

Claire Mathis Anderson (May 8, 1891 – March 23, 1964) was an American silent film actress who worked with Constance Talmadge, Harry Carey, Thurston Hall, Tom Mix and Gloria Swanson. She was described as one of the original Sennett Bathing Beauties.

== Life ==
A native of Detroit, Anderson initially worked as a telephone operator at Hudson's department store in Detroit.

Anderson became the first documented double used in film in 1914 when she replaced Blanche Sweet in some scenes of The Escape while Sweet had scarlet fever. She also volunteered to replace a leading lady in a Sennett comedy who refused to enter a lion's cage. After Anderson entered the cage, she received a contract for $675 a week.

Anderson also appeared in the 1944 production of Mexican Hayride at the Winter Garden Theatre in New York City.

She was married to Harry H. Anderson, a Hollywood automobile agent.

== Selected filmography ==
- The Story of a Story - 1915
- His Bread and Butter - 1916
- A Clever Dummy - 1917
- The Hidden Spring (1917)
- The Fly God - 1918
- Who Cares? (1919)
- The Spitfire of Seville (1919)
- Rider of the Law - 1919
- The Fatal Sign - 1920
- The Girl in Number 29 - 1920
- The Palace of Darkened Windows (1920)
- The Path She Chose (1920)
- The Servant in the House - 1921
- When We Were 21 (1921)
- Who Am I? (1921)
- The Yellow Stain - 1922
- The Clean Up (1923)
- The Meddler (1925)
- Unseen Enemies (1926)
