= The Beckoning Trail =

1916 film

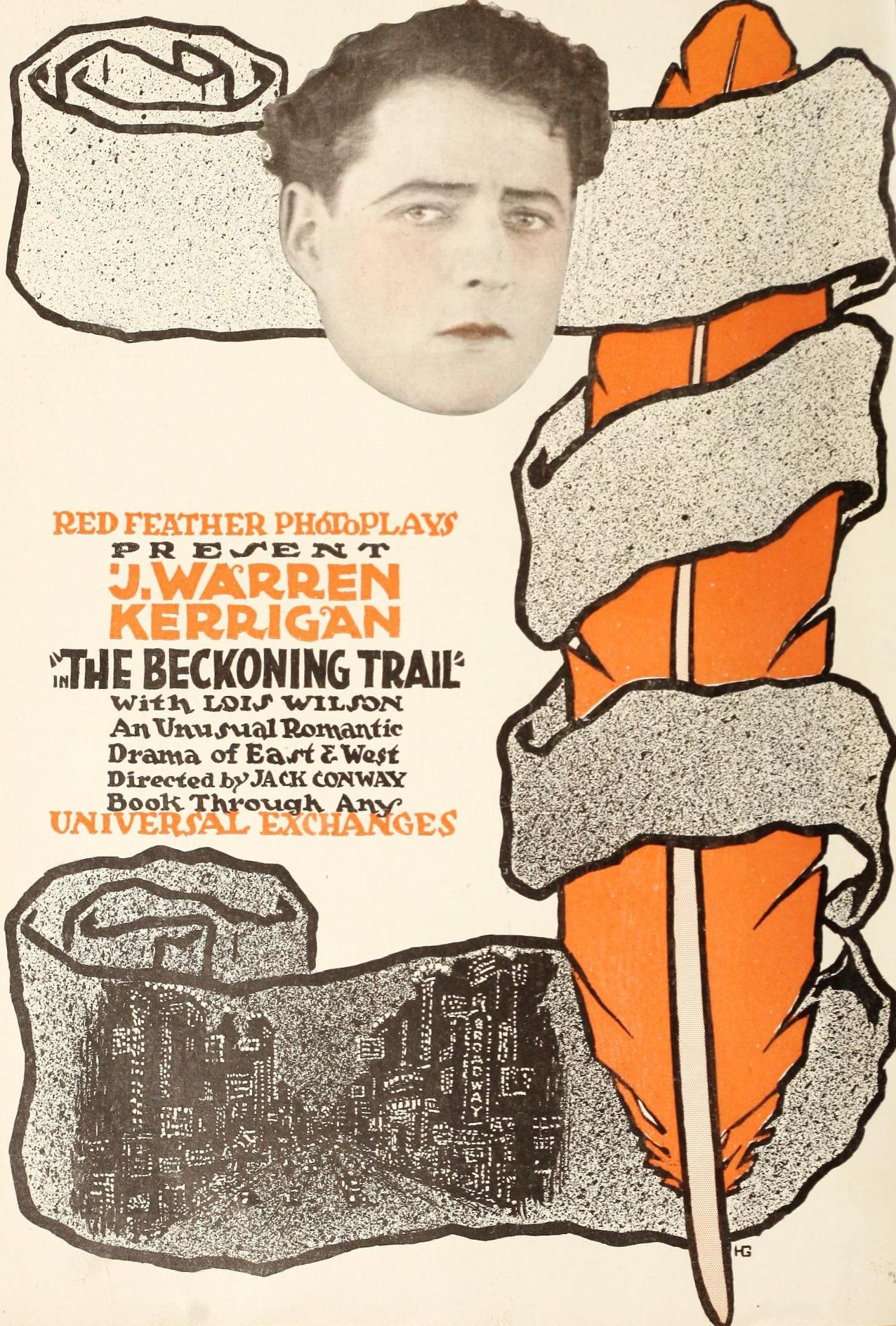
- Theatrical release poster
- Directed by: Jack Conway
- Written by: F. McGrew Willis
- Starring: J. Warren Kerrigan; Lois Wilson; Maude George
- Cinematography: Duke Hayward
- Production company: Universal Pictures
- Distributed by: Universal Pictures
- Release date: August 21, 1916
- Running time: 50 minutes
- Country: United States
- Languages: Silent; English intertitles

The Beckoning Trail is a 1916 American silent Western melodrama film directed by Jack Conway and starring J. Warren Kerrigan, Lois Wilson and Maude George.

== Cast ==
- J. Warren Kerrigan as Carter Raymond
- Maude George as Georgette Fallon
- Harry Carter as 'Placer' Murray
- Harry Griffith as 'Big Jim' Helton
- Lois Wilson as Mary Helton
- Ray Hanford as Dodd

== Production ==
The Beckoning Trail was partially filmed on location at Coulterville, California.

== Preservation ==
With no holdings located in archives, The Beckoning Trail is considered a lost film.
