= Maude George =

American actress

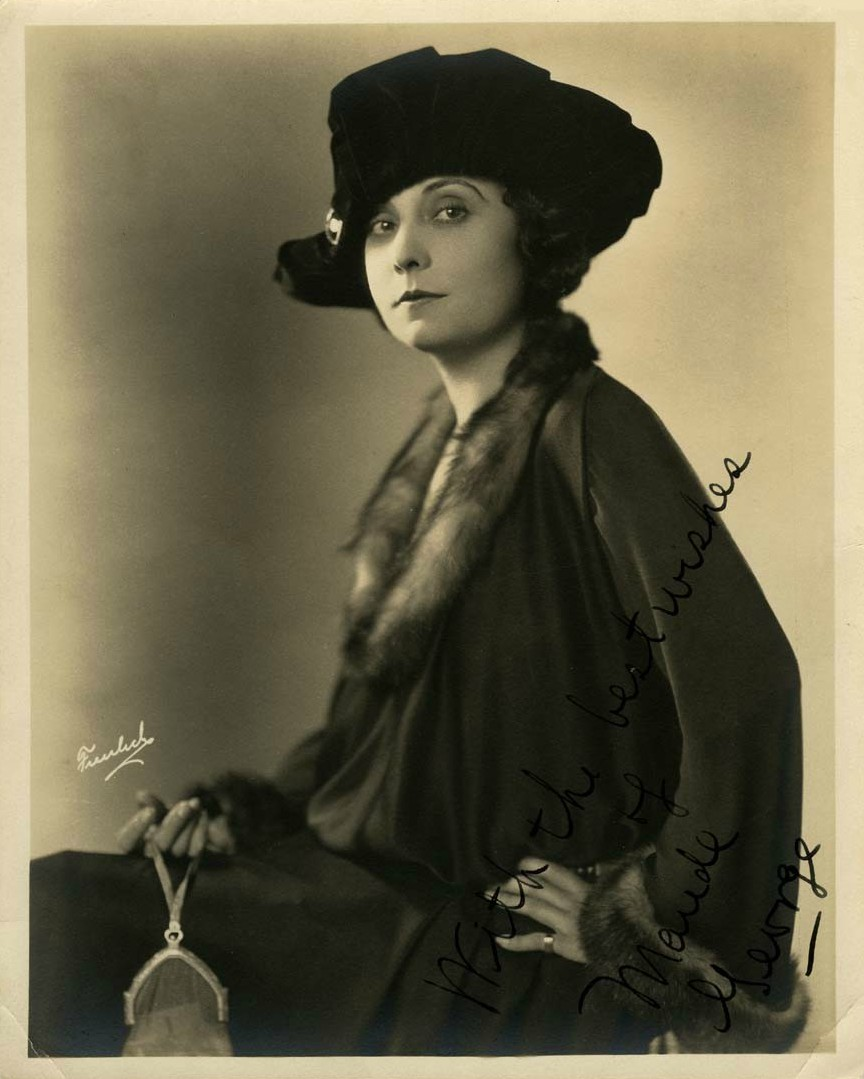
- Maude George, early 1920s
- Born: August 15, 1888; Riverside, California, US
- Died: October 10, 1963 (aged 75); Sepulveda, California, US
- Occupation: Actress
- Years active: 1915–1929
- Relatives: Grace George (aunt)

Maude George (August 15, 1888 – October 10, 1963) was an American actress of the silent era.

== Biography ==
Born in Riverside, California, in 1888, Maude George is remembered primarily as a regular of director Eric von Stroheim's stock company of actors appearing in four of von Stroheim's lengthy films in the 1920s. She appeared in more than 50 films between 1915 and 1929. She also wrote the scenario for the 1917 film The Fighting Gringo which starred Harry Carey.

George's career began on the legitimate stage and worked with Nat Goodwin in a troupe that toured the United States. George, a niece of actress Grace George, died in 1963 in Sepulveda, California at age 75.

== Partial filmography ==
- Langdon's Legacy (1916)
- The Silent Battle (1916)
- The Beckoning Trail (1916)
- Idle Wives (1916)
- The Social Buccaneer (1916)
- The People vs. John Doe (1916)
- The Iron Hand (1916)
- Magda (1917)
- The Piper's Price (1917)
- Even As You and I (1917)
- Heart Strings (1917)
- Barbary Sheep (1917) *incomplete, only an 8-minute clip exists
- 'Blue Blazes' Rawden (1918)
- The Marriage Ring (1918) *lost film
- The Midnight Stage (1919)
- A Rogue's Romance (1919) *lost film
- Madame X (1920)
- The Devil's Pass Key (1920) *lost film
- Roads of Destiny (1921)
- Foolish Wives (1922)
- The Power of a Lie (1922)
- Monte Cristo (1922)
- Merry-Go-Round (1923)
- Temporary Marriage (1923)
- Six Days (1923)
- The Drums of Jeopardy (1923)
- Torment (1924) *lost film
- Worldly Goods (1924)
- Soiled (1925)
- The Love Toy (1926) *lost film
- Altars of Desire (1927)
- Isle of Lost Men (1928)
- The Garden of Eden (1928)
- The Wedding March (1928) *lost film
- After the Storm (1928)
- The Woman from Moscow (1928) *incomplete, only reels 4, 6, and 7 exist
- The Veiled Woman (1929)
