= The Story of a Story =

1915 film

- Directed by: Tod Browning
- Starring: Eugene Pallette; Miriam Cooper
- Release date: 20 April 1915
- Running time: 1 reel
- Country: United States
- Language: Silent with English intertitles

The Story of a Story is a 1915 American short fantasy film directed by Tod Browning.

== Cast ==
- Eugene Pallette as John Penhallow
- Miriam Cooper as His daughter
- Frankie Newman
- Charles Lee
- Claire Anderson
