= Long Pants =

1927 film

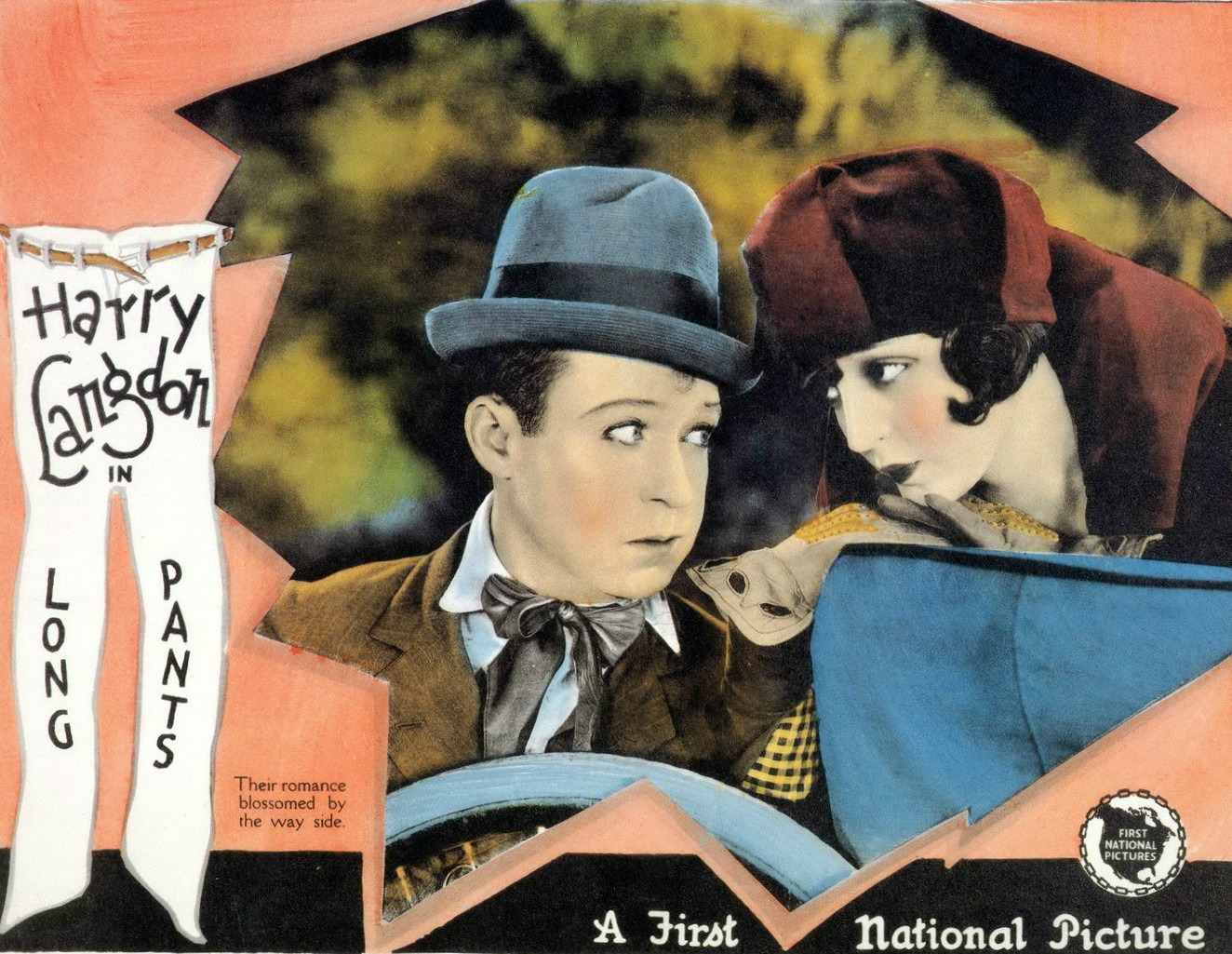
- Lobby card
- Directed by: Frank Capra
- Written by: Robert Eddy; Tay Garnett
- Story by: Arthur Ripley
- Produced by: Harry Langdon
- Starring: Harry Langdon; Gladys Brockwell
- Cinematography: Glenn Kershner; Elgin Lessley
- Edited by: Harry Langdon
- Production company: Harry Langdon Corporation
- Distributed by: First National Pictures
- Release date: March 26, 1927
- Running time: 60 minutes
- Country: United States
- Language: Silent (English intertitles)

Long Pants (also known as Johnny Newcomer) is a 1927 American silent comedy film directed by Frank Capra and starring Harry Langdon. Additional cast members include Gladys Brockwell, Alan Roscoe, and Priscilla Bonner.

== Plot ==
Long Pants (1927)

Harry Shelby has been kept in knee-pants for years by his mother. One day, however, Harry finally gets his first pair of long pants.

Immediately, his family expects him to marry his childhood sweetheart Priscilla. Yet, Harry soon falls for Bebe Blair, a femme fatale from the big city who has a boyfriend in the mob.

Harry thinks that Bebe is interested in him as well, so he risks everything when Bebe ends up in jail. This leads to a lot of trouble for Harry. Throughout the whole ordeal Priscilla waits for Harry to face reality.

Mama's Boy Harry Shelby has at last taken notice of the opposite sex. But he becomes fixated on terminal "bad girl" Bebe Blair, temporarily stranded in town by a flat tire. Harry attempts to impress her with trick bicycle riding, to absolutely no effect.

Harry's parents decide to counter Bebe's influence by marrying him off to the nice girl next door, Priscilla. But when Harry reads Bebe has been jailed for smuggling narcotics, he decides he must rush to her side. But there is a wedding to squirm out of. Just before the ceremony, Harry lures Priscilla into the woods, intending to shoot her. But his top hat becomes jammed down over his eyes. He loses the gun in thick leaves and he becomes tangled in a barbed wire fence. Priscilla then finds the gun and takes target practice with it, terrifying Harry. He flees to the big city.

Upon arrival, Harry bumps into Bebe on the street...she has escaped jail on her own. Bebe allows herself to be sealed into a packing crate, which Harry publicly lugs through a crowded downtown. Harry stops to rest in front of a theatre. A dog steals his shoe. While Harry chases the dog, a stagehand places a realistic mannequin of a policeman atop the crate. Harry fakes a fire, a hold-up, and a heart attack to get the "policeman" to move. The last one gets him doused with water buckets by a Good Samaritan. Then a stagehand claims the mannequin and an actual cop takes its place. Harry skulls the "mannequin" with a brick. While Harry outruns the law, the crate catches onto the back of a truck and is dragged several blocks. Harry returns and takes a different crate that contains a live alligator. He quickly discovers his mistake.

Bebe commits a series of well-publicized stick-ups, each time with Harry as the dupe lookout. Bebe decides to go backstage at a disreputable theatre and settle scores with an old romantic rival. Bebe and the other woman's boyfriend end up shooting each other dead. The shots stampede the nightclub crowd...right over Harry.

With one arm in a sling, Harry returns home and walks in on the family saying "Grace" at dinner. He silently joins them.

== Cast ==
- Harry Langdon as Harry Shelby
- Gladys Brockwell as His Mother
- Alan Roscoe as His Father
- Priscilla Bonner as Priscilla, His Bride
- Alma Bennett as Bebe Blair, His Downfall
- Betty Francisco as His Finish
- Glenn Tryon as Glenn Tryon
- Billy Aikin as Minor Role (uncredited)
- Rosalind Byrne as Minor Role (uncredited)
- Ann Christy as Minor Role (uncredited)
- Frankie Darro as Young Harry Shelby (uncredited)
- John Darrow as Minor Role (uncredited)
- Artye Folz as Minor Role (uncredited)
- Young Griffo as Minor Role (uncredited)
- Ruth Hiatt as Minor Role (uncredited)
- Tenen Holtz as Minor Role (uncredited)
- Peaches Jackson as Minor Role (uncredited)
- Bud Jamison as Minor Role (uncredited)
- Muriel Kingston as Minor Role (uncredited)
- Natalie Kingston as Minor Role (uncredited)
- Babe London as Wedding Guest
- Ralph Rigard as Minor Role (uncredited)
- Ted Stroback as Minor Role (uncredited)
- Duane Thompson as Minor Role (uncredited)
- Alice Ward as Minor Role (uncredited)
- Marjorie Whiteis as Minor Role (uncredited)
- Bill Wolfe as Minor Role (uncredited)
- Jerome Young as Minor Role (uncredited)

== Critical reception ==
When it was released, film critic Mordaunt Hall gave the film a positive review. He wrote, "Some hilarious passages enliven Harry Langdon's latest film oddity, Long' Pants...Although these incidents are acted with consummate skill, except for an occasional repetition, it is quite obvious to any male who has made the decisive change from short to long trousers that the idea offers possibilities far greater and more genuine than those that greet the eye. The answer is that Mr. Langdon has once again capitulated to his omnipotent band of gag-men. It may be all very well for Harold Lloyd to rely on mechanical twists, but Langdon possesses a cherubic countenance, which offers him a chance in other directions...Mr. Langdon is still Charles Spencer Chaplin's sincerest flatterer. His short coat reminds one of Chaplin, and now and again his footwork is like that of the great screen comedian." According to Capra, the movie was a success with audiences at the time.

Film historian David Kalat reports that Buster Keaton, a long-time fan of Langdon's known for his own morbid jokes about death and killings, criticized a scene in which Langdon's character tries to kill Priscilla as "going too far" in making light of murder.

More recently, critic Maria Schneider reviewed Langdon's work and wrote, "Long Pants (1927), also directed by Capra, was a peculiar change of pace for Langdon, and possibly an attempt to poke fun at his baby-faced image by casting him as a would-be lady-killer; sporting little of the ingenuity of The Strong Man, it was a box-office failure that set off the comedian's quick decline into obscurity. An acquired taste, Harry Langdon's gentle absurdities and slow rhythms take some getting used to, but patient viewers will be rewarded."

== See also ==
- List of United States comedy films
