= Even As You and I =

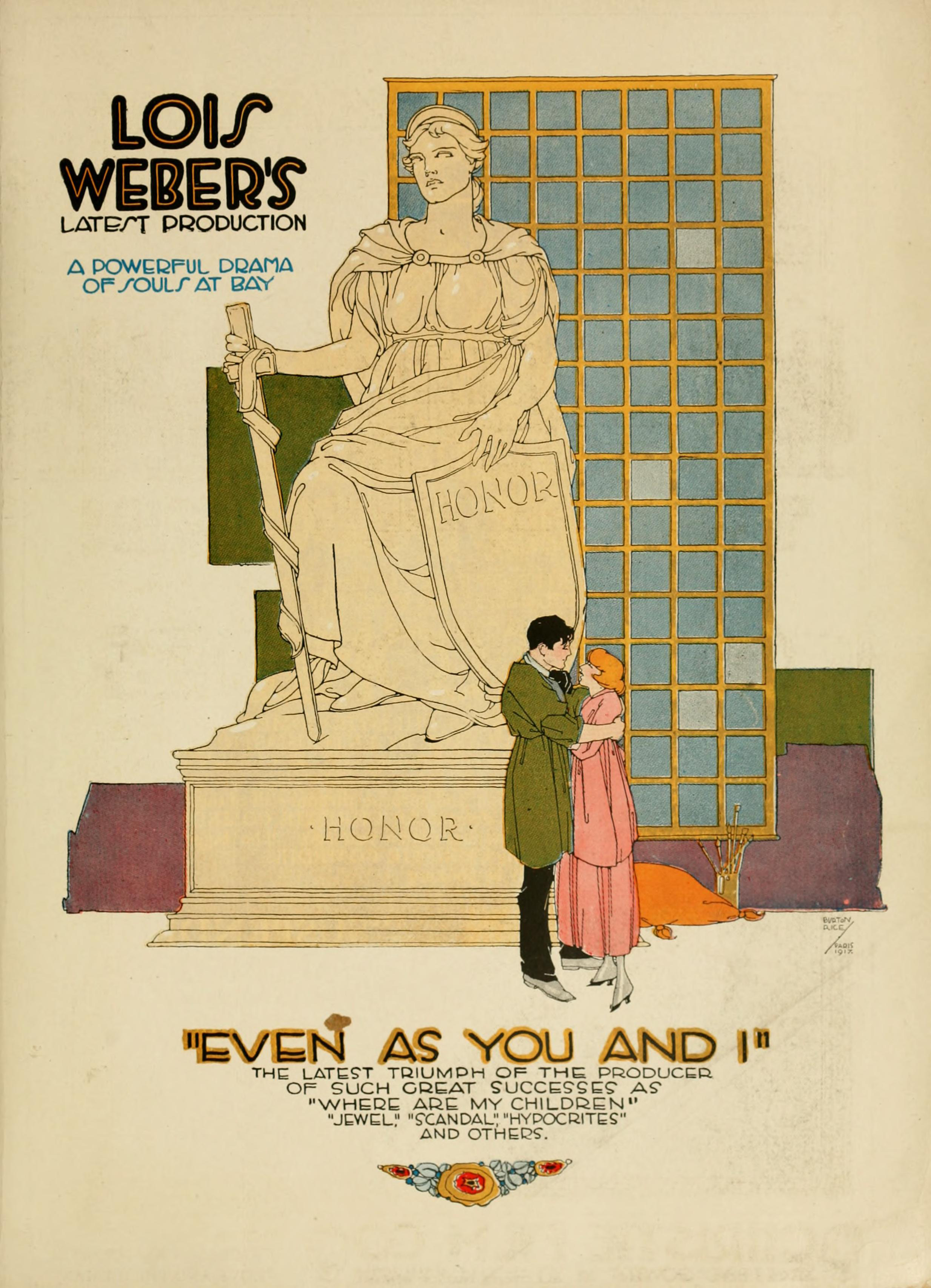
- Directed by: Lois Weber
- Written by: Maud Grange; F. McGrew Willis; Walter Woods
- Starring: Ben F. Wilson; Mignon Anderson; Bertram Grassby
- Production company: Universal Pictures
- Distributed by: Universal Pictures
- Release date: April 1, 1917
- Running time: 70 minutes
- Country: United States
- Languages: Silent; English intertitles

Even As You and I is a 1917 American silent drama film directed by Lois Weber and starring Ben F. Wilson, Mignon Anderson and Bertram Grassby. No prints of the picture are known to exist, so it is considered a lost film.

== Cast ==
- Ben F. Wilson as Carrillo
- Mignon Anderson as Selma
- Bertram Grassby as Artist
- Priscilla Dean as Artist's Wife
- Harry Carter as Saturniska
- Maude George as Cleo
- Hayward Mack as Jacques
- Earle Page as Stray
- Edwin Wallock as Wisdom
- Seymour Hastings as Experience

== Bibliography ==
- John T. Soister, Henry Nicolella & Steve Joyce. American Silent Horror, Science Fiction and Fantasy Feature Films, 1913-1929. McFarland, 2014.
