= Fatty's Day Off =

1913 film

- Directed by: Wilfred Lucas
- Starring: Fatty Arbuckle
- Release date: September 1913
- Country: United States
- Languages: Silent; English intertitles

Fatty's Day Off is a 1913 American short comedy film featuring Fatty Arbuckle. Prints and/or fragments were found in the Dawson Film Find in 1978.

== Plot ==
Fatty goes to the beach, where he's teased by mischievous boys who send him into the sea in a rolling chair.

== Cast ==
The cast included:

- Roscoe "Fatty" Arbuckle: Fatty
- Charles Avery: Mischievous Boy
- Grover Ligon: Invalid in Chair
- Fred Gamble: Waiter
- Bill Hauber: Cop

== See also ==
- Fatty Arbuckle filmography
