= The Meddler (1925 film) =

1925 film

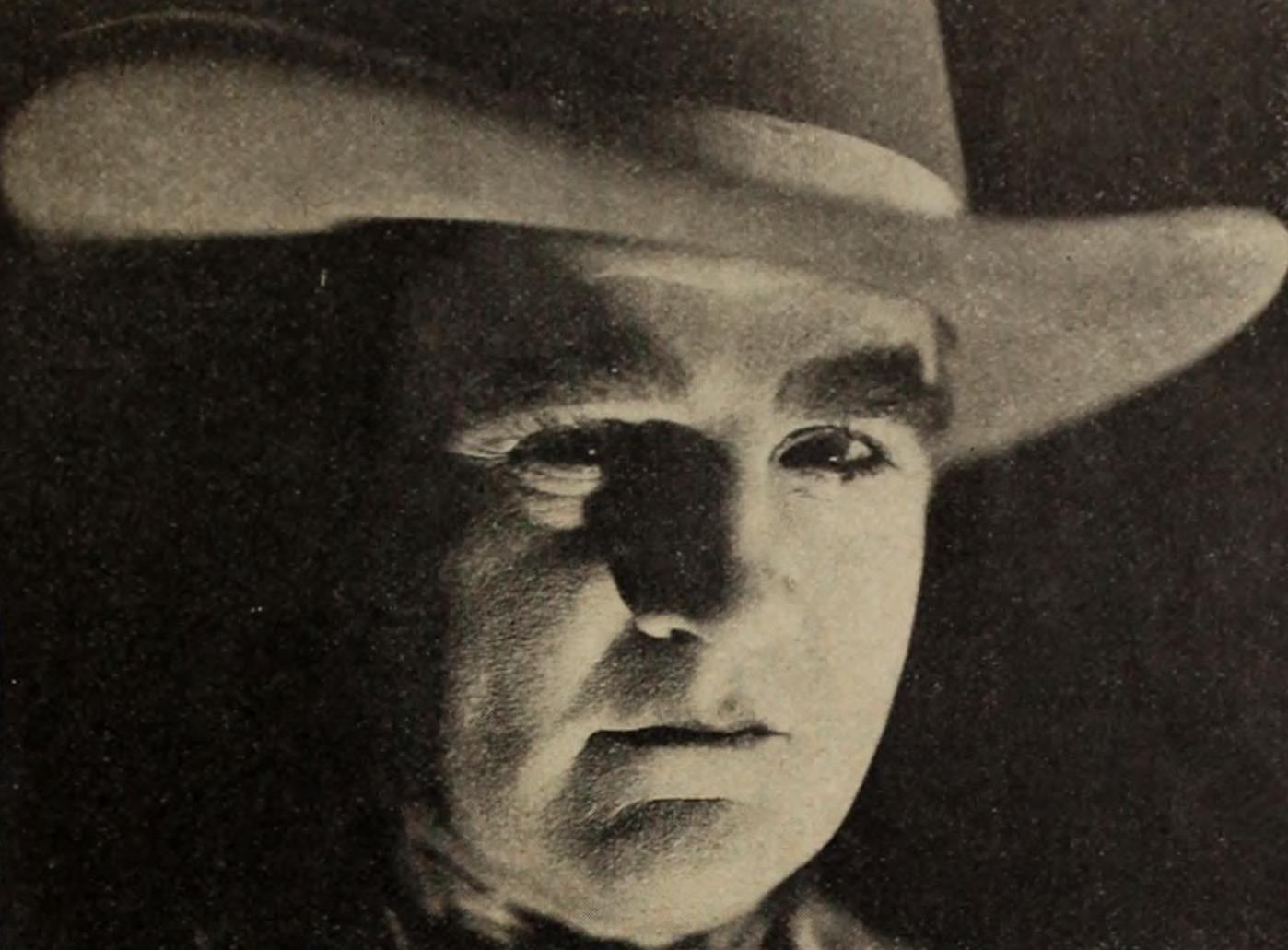
- William Desmond in a contemporary publicity photo for the film
- Directed by: Arthur Rosson
- Written by: Isadore Bernstein; W. Scott Darling; Miles Overholt
- Starring: William Desmond; Gloria Roy; Claire Anderson
- Cinematography: Gilbert Warrenton
- Production company: Universal Pictures
- Distributed by: Universal Pictures
- Release date: June 28, 1925
- Running time: 50 minutes
- Country: United States
- Languages: Silent; English intertitles

The Meddler is a 1925 American silent Western film directed by Arthur Rosson and starring William Desmond, Gloria Roy, and Claire Anderson.

== Plot ==
As described in a film magazine review, millionaire Richard Gilmore goes west to conquer his sense of fear. At his fiancée's instigation, he turns to polite banditry. He aids a starving widow and her children, frustrates some cattle rustlers, and even overcomes an honest rancher to convince him that his life is in danger. After he succeeds in saving the rancher and his sister, the rustlers are rounded up. He hears that his fiancée has married another, paving the way for his future happiness with the rancher's sister.

== Cast ==
- William Desmond as Richard Gilmore
- Gloria Roy as Gloria Canfield
- Claire Anderson as Dorothy Parkhurst
- Albert J. Smith as Bud Meyers
- Jack Dougherty as Jesse Canfield
- C.L. Sherwood as Sheriff
- Kate Lester as Mrs. Gilmore
- George Grandee as Secretary
- D.R.O. Hatswell as Captain Forsythe

== Preservation ==
With no holdings located in archives, The Meddler is considered a lost film.

== Bibliography ==
- Robert B. Connelly. The Silents: Silent Feature Films, 1910-36, Volume 40, Issue 2. December Press, 1998.
