= Idle Wives =

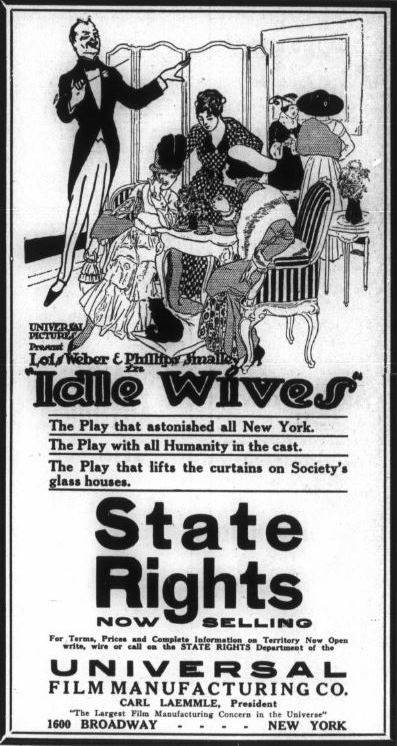
- Advertisement
- Directed by: Lois Weber; Phillips Smalley
- Written by: Lois Weber
- Starring: Lois Weber; Phillips Smalley; Mary MacLaren; Maude George
- Cinematography: Allen G. Siegler
- Distributed by: Universal Film Manufacturing Company
- Release date: September 15, 1916
- Running time: 7 reels
- Country: United States
- Language: Silent (English intertitles)

Idle Wives is a 1916 American silent drama film co-directed by Lois Weber and Phillips Smalley. The film was released by Universal Film Manufacturing Company. Surviving reels of the film are preserved at the Library of Congress. The film was released on DVD/Blu-ray in 2018.

== Plot ==
The first two reels of Idle Wives

Characters go to the movies to watch Life's Mirror, a film where they see their own lives turned into dramas. A shop girl dating a young man against her parents' wishes watches her onscreen counterpart become pregnant; an impoverished family watches as a family onscreen lives beyond their means; and an unfaithful husband watches as his onscreen wife leaves him and returns to social work. After the film characters have learned their lessons: the shop girl apologizes to her parents; the family decides to live within its means; and the wealthy man leaves his mistress and returns to his wife.

== Cast ==
- Lois Weber as Anne
- Phillips Smalley as John Wall
- Mary MacLaren as Molly
- Edwin Hearn as Richard
- Seymour Hastings as Billy Shane
- Countess Du Cello as Wall's Mother
- Pauline Aster as Alberta
- Cecilia Matthews as Molly's Mother
- Ben F. Wilson as Mr. Jamison
- Maude George as Mrs. Jamison
- Neva Gerber as Mary Wells
- Charles Perley as Tough Burns
