= The Chalice of Sorrow =

1916 film directed by Rex Ingram

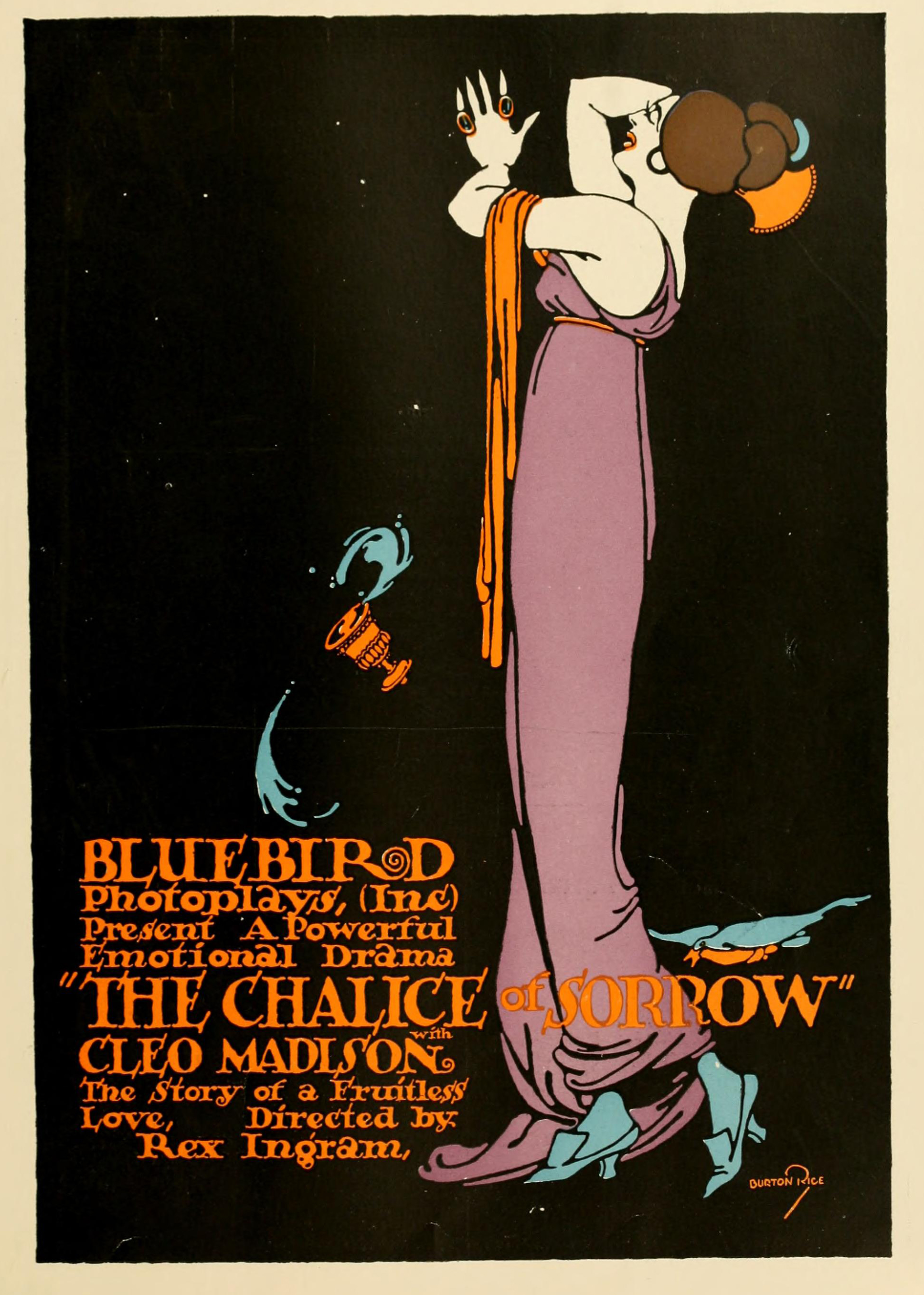
- Directed by: Rex Ingram
- Written by: Rex Ingram
- Based on: the play La Tosca by Victorien Sardou and the opera Tosca, libretto by Luigi Illica and Giuseppe Giacosa based upon Sardou's play, music by Giacomo Puccini
- Produced by: Bluebird Photoplays
- Starring: Cleo Madison
- Cinematography: Duke Hayward; George W. Lawrence
- Distributed by: Bluebird Photoplays in conjunction with Universal Film Manufacturing Company
- Release date: October 9, 1916
- Running time: 5 reels
- Country: United States
- Language: Silent..English titles

The Chalice of Sorrow is a 1916 American silent drama film written and directed by Rex Ingram and starring Cleo Madison. It was produced by the Bluebird Photoplays subsidiary of Universal Film Manufacturing Company.

The film was called The Chalice of Remorse in the UK.

== Cast ==
- Cleo Madison as Lorelei
- Blanche White as Isabel Clifford
- Charles Cummings as Marion Leslie
- John McDermott as Rance Clifford
- Wedgwood Nowell as Francisco De Sarpina
- Howard Crampton as Siestra
- Albert MacQuarrie as Pietro
- Rhea Haines as Pietro's Wife

unbilled

- John George as Mexican
- Jack Holt

== Preservation status ==
- The film is preserved in the UCLA Film & Television Archive and Filmarchiv Austria, Vienna.
