= Duke Hayward =

British cinematographer

- Born: Bernard Charles Hayward; January 14, 1880; Hampton Wick, England, U.K.
- Died: October 30, 1918 (aged 38); Los Angeles, California, U.S.
- Occupation: Cinematographer
- Spouse(s): Evangeline Moran (divorced); Lillie Hayward

Duke Hayward (born Bernard Charles Hayward, January 14, 1880 – October 30, 1918) was a British cinematographer who worked in Hollywood during the silent era. His career was cut short by his untimely death in 1918 at the age of 38 from the Spanish flu.

== Biography ==
Bernard Charles Hayward was born in Hampton Wick, England, to Charles Hayward and Emily Henriques. He arrived in Los Angeles around 1904 and began working as a photographer for the Hearst newspaper chain before trying his hand as a cinematographer in the early days of the motion picture industry. He died in 1918 of the Spanish flu in Los Angeles; his wife, screenwriter Lillie Hayward, had given birth to a daughter just weeks earlier.

== Selected filmography ==
- The Marriage Lie (1918)
- The Wine Girl (1918)
- The Girl in the Dark (1918)
- Beloved Jim (1917)
- Fear Not (1917)
- The Birth of Patriotism (1917)
- The Flower of Doom (1917)
- The Pulse of Life (1917)
- Black Orchids (1917)
- The Chalice of Sorrow (1916)
- The Beckoning Trail (1916)
- The Silent Battle (1916)
- Naked Hearts (1916)
- A Yankee from the West (1915)
