= Rosalind Byrne =

American actress

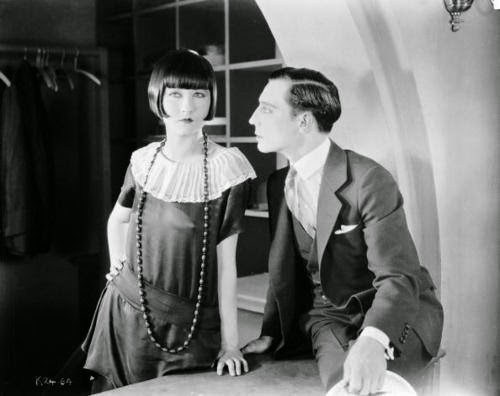
- Rosalind Byrne and Buster Keaton in Seven Chances (1925)
- Born: Rosalind Loretta Mooney; February 19, 1904; Ohio, United States
- Died: August 9, 1989 (aged 85); Illinois, United States
- Occupation: Actress
- Years active: 1923–1930

Rosalind Byrne (born Rosalind Loretta Mooney, February 19, 1904 – August 9, 1989) was an American silent film actress. Best known for her small but memorable roles during the 1920s, she appeared in films such as The Fast Set (1924), Seven Chances (1925) and Long Pants (1927).

== Biography ==
Byrne was the daughter of Judge William Thomas Mooney; her uncles included Daniel F. Mooney, US ambassador to Paraguay 1914–21, and Congressman Charles Mooney. After practising acting in amateur theatrical productions at the Immaculate Heart Convent, Rosalind Byrne began her Hollywood career as an extra, appearing in more than 300 films.

Her fortune changed on the set of the First National production Flaming Youth (1923) where her presence on set caught the attention of director John Francis Dillon and he gave her a small part.

Impressed by her performance, Dillon predicted a promising future for her in the industry. That same year, she was even labeled the studios’ latest "find".

Although she continued to land small roles throughout the late 1920s, her career did not develop as expected. Rosalind Byrne retired from the film industry in 1929.

== Selected filmography ==
- 1923: Flaming Youth – Fabian Flapper (as Rosalind Mooney)
- 1924: The Garden of Weeds
- 1924: Wine of Youth as smoking party guest
- 1924: So This Is Marriage
- 1924: Worldly Goods
- 1924: The Fast Set – Connie Gallies
- 1924: Sherlock Jr. – box-office cashier
- 1925: Seven Chances – hat check girl (as Rosalind Mooney)
- 1925: Locked Doors
- 1925: The Marriage Whirl as Party Guest
- 1925: The Freshman as Girl in Suspenders at The Fall Frolic
- 1926: The Midnight Sun
- 1927: Casey at the Bat as a Floradora girl
- 1927: Ten Modern Commandments
- 1927: Long Pants
- 1928: That Certain Thing
- 1928: What Price Beauty?
- 1929: The Case of Lena Smith
- 1929: Innocents of Paris
