= When We Were 21 =

1921 film

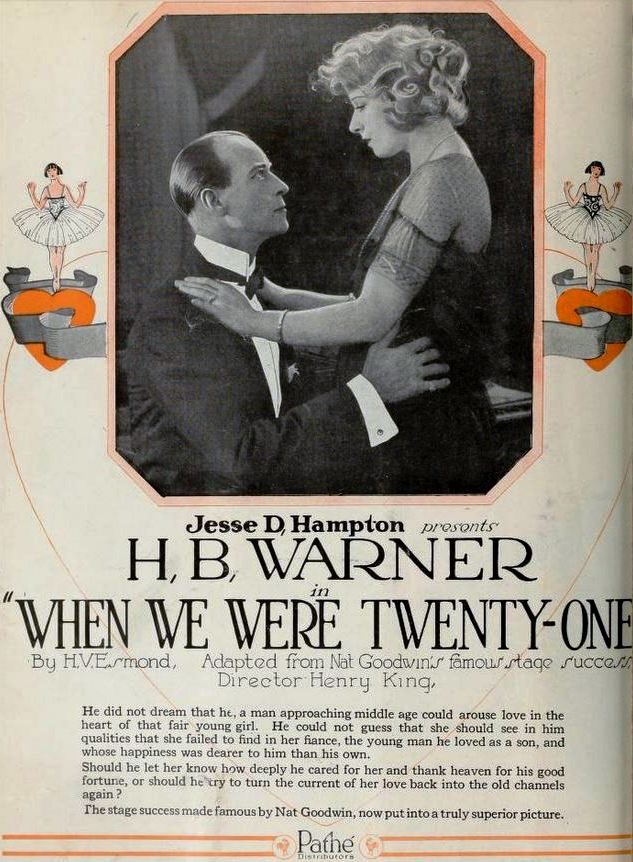
- Advertisement
- Directed by: Henry King
- Written by: H.V. Esmond (play)
- Produced by: Jesse D. Hampton
- Starring: H.B. Warner; Claire Anderson; James Morrison
- Cinematography: Victor Milner
- Production company: Jesse D. Hampton Productions
- Distributed by: Pathé Exchange
- Release date: January 1921
- Running time: 50 minutes
- Country: United States
- Language: Silent (English intertitles)

When We Were 21 is a 1921 American silent comedy drama film directed by Henry King and starring H.B. Warner, Claire Anderson, and James Morrison.

== Cast ==
- H.B. Warner as Richard Carewe
- Claire Anderson as Phyllis
- James Morrison as Richard Audaine
- Christine Mayo as Kara Glynesk
- Claude Payton as Dave
- Minna Grey as Mrs. Ericson

== Bibliography ==
- Donald W. McCaffrey & Christopher P. Jacobs. Guide to the Silent Years of American Cinema. Greenwood Publishing, 1999. ISBN 0-313-30345-2
