= Who Am I? (1921 film) =

1921 film

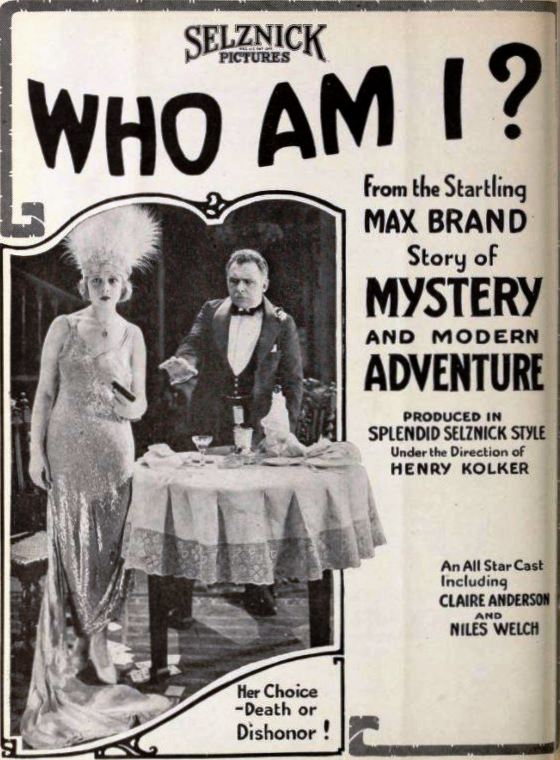
- Directed by: Henry Kolker
- Written by: Katherine S. Reed
- Produced by: Lewis J. Selznick
- Starring: Claire Anderson; Gertrude Astor; Niles Welch
- Cinematography: Max Dupont
- Production company: Selznick Pictures
- Distributed by: Select Pictures
- Release date: July 1921
- Running time: 50 minutes
- Country: United States
- Languages: Silent; English intertitles

Who Am I? is a 1921 American silent drama film directed by Henry Kolker and starring Claire Anderson, Gertrude Astor and Niles Welch.

== Plot ==
Who Am I explores the journey of a man with amnesia in search of his identity. The narrative unfolds as he encounters various individuals who either aid or impede his quest, leading to a series of challenges that test his resolve. Through his journey, the film delves into themes of memory, ethics, and the nature of self, culminating in a pivotal revelation that resolves his quest for identity.

== Cast ==
- Claire Anderson as Ruth Burns
- Gertrude Astor as Victoria Danforth
- Niles Welch as Jimmy Weaver
- George Periolat as John Collins
- Josef Swickard as Jacques Marbot
- Otto Hoffman as William Zoltz

== Bibliography ==
- Connelly, Robert B. The Silents: Silent Feature Films, 1910-36, Volume 40, Issue 2. December Press, 1998.
- Munden, Kenneth White. The American Film Institute Catalog of Motion Pictures Produced in the United States, Part 1. University of California Press, 1997.
