= The Pulse of Life =

1917 film directed by Rex Ingram

- Directed by: Rex Ingram
- Written by: E. Magnus Ingleton; Rex Ingram
- Starring: Wedgwood Nowell; Gypsy Hart; Dorothy Barrett
- Cinematography: Duke Hayward
- Production company: Universal Pictures
- Distributed by: Universal Pictures
- Release date: April 9, 1917
- Country: United States
- Languages: Silent; English intertitles

The Pulse of Life is a 1917 American silent drama film directed by Rex Ingram and starring Wedgwood Nowell, Gypsy Hart and Dorothy Barrett.

== Cast ==
- Wedgwood Nowell as Guido Serrani
- Gypsy Hart as Lisetta Maseto
- Dorothy Barrett as Buckety Sue
- Molly Malone as Molly Capels
- Nicholas Dunaew as Domenic
- Millard K. Wilson as Stanford Graham
- Albert MacQuarrie as 'Dago' Joe
- J. Edwin Brown as Luigi Maseto
- Seymour Hastings as Hasting Capels
- William J. Dwyer as Fish Merchant

== Bibliography ==
- Leonhard Gmür. Rex Ingram: Hollywood's Rebel of the Silver Screen. 2013.
