= American Born =

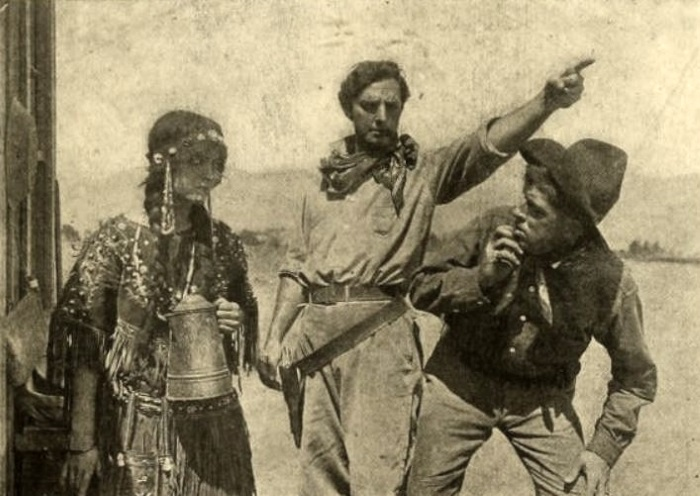
- Film still
- Directed by: Lorimer Johnston
- Story by: F.A. Heiskell
- Starring: Sydney Ayres; Harry Van Meter; Charles Cummings; Jacques Jaccard; Louise Lester; Charles Morrison; Jack Richardson; Vivian Rich
- Distributed by: Mutual Film
- Release date: December 1, 1913
- Country: United States
- Languages: Silent film English intertitles

American Born is a 1913 American drama silent short film starring Sydney Ayres, Harry Van Meter, Charles Cummings, Jacques Jaccard, Louise Lester, Charles Morrison, Jack Richardson, and Vivian Rich.
