= Trails of Adventure =

1933 film

- Directed by: Jay Wilsey
- Written by: Donald Kent
- Produced by: Robert J. Horner
- Starring: Jay Wilsey; Edna Aslin; Harry Carter
- Cinematography: A.J. Fitzpatrick
- Edited by: Henry Adams
- Production company: American Pictures
- Distributed by: American Pictures
- Release date: October 1, 1933
- Running time: 55 minutes
- Country: United States
- Language: English

Trails of Adventure is a 1933 American Western film directed by Jay Wilsey and starring Wilsey, Edna Aslin and Harry Carter.

== Cast ==
- Jay Wilsey as Bill Merritt
- Edna Aslin as Jane Gordon
- Harry Carter as 'Ace' Carter
- Allen Holbrook as Fred Kane
- Raymond Wells as Jim Gordon
- Belle D'Arcy as Mrs. Gordon
- N.E. Hendrix as Hack Harris
- Victor Adamson as Henchman
- Ken Broeker as Sheriff

== Bibliography ==
- Michael R. Pitts. Poverty Row Studios, 1929–1940: An Illustrated History of 55 Independent Film Companies, with a Filmography for Each. McFarland & Company, 2005.
