= Wedgwood Nowell =

American film and stage actor (1878-1957)

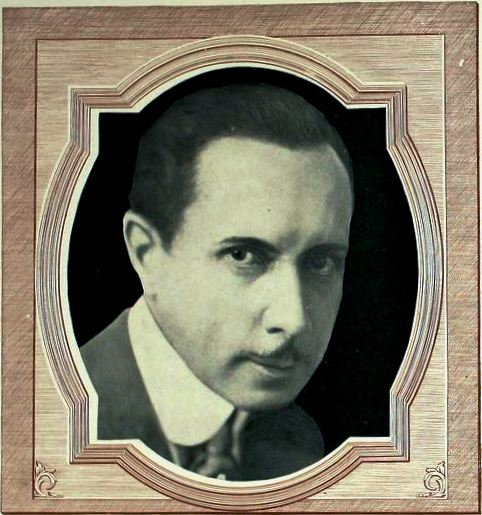
- Portrait in Robertson-Cole Pictures advertisement, 1920
- Born: Harry Wedgwood Nowell; January 24, 1878; Portsmouth, New Hampshire U.S.
- Died: June 17, 1957 (aged 79); Philadelphia, Pennsylvania, U.S.
- Burial place: West Laurel Hill Cemetery, Bala Cynwyd, Pennsylvania, U.S.
- Occupations: Actor, director, producer, musician
- Years active: 1901–1947
- Spouse(s): Edna Claire Colwell (m. 1903-?); Irma Stowe (m. ?-1951; her death); Elizabeth (m. ?-1957; his death)
- Children: 3 daughters

Wedgwood Nowell (January 24, 1878 – June 17, 1957), born Harry Wedgwood Nowell, was an American stage and film actor, director, producer, and musician. He produced 144 plays during his stage career, which began around 1901. He performed in at least 140 films between 1915 and the 1940s.

== Early life and education ==
Nowell was the son of Herbert W. Nowell and Elizabeth Nowell. His father was superintendent of a manufacturing company. He was a descendant of Josiah Wedgwood, the founder of the Wedgwood pottery and ceramics factory, and Nowell maintained a collection of pottery created by his ancestor.

Nowell attended English High School in Worcester, Massachusetts. His interest in performing began during the three years that he worked as an usher at a theater in Worcester. He was interested in music, and after he moved with his family to Philadelphia, he studied music theory at the University of Pennsylvania. He joined the Mask and Wig Club and the Garrick Club and performed in productions of each group.

== Career ==
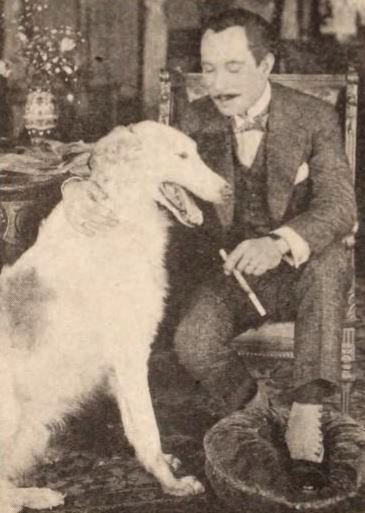
Film still of Nowell as the gentleman thief Arsène Lupin with his Russian wolfhound in the 1920 mystery film 813

After performing in amateur burlesques, dramas, and operas, Nowell made his professional stage debut in 1897 as a member of the stock company at the Girard Avenue Theater in Philadelphia. He remained there until the 1899 season began. After a brief time with Rice's comedians he became the leading juvenile with the Katie Emmet company. In 1900 he was with F. C. Whitney's "Quo Vadis" company.

In 1914 Nowell managed Poli's Auditorium Theater in Baltimore.

Nowell's work in films included starring in 813 (1920). Other films in which he appeared included Money Isn't Everything (1918).

== Later years and death ==
He was living in the Walnut Hotel in Philadelphia for the last two years of his life. He died June 17, 1957, and was interred at West Laurel Hill Cemetery in Bala Cynwyd, Pennsylvania.

== Selected filmography ==
- The Golden Claw (1915)
- The Chalice of Sorrow (1916)
- Black Orchids (1917)
- The Flower of Doom (1917)
- The Hand That Rocks the Cradle (1917)
- The Mysterious Mr. Tiller (1917)
- The Pulse of Life (1917)
- The Reward of the Faithless (1917)
- The Velvet Hand (1918)
- Adele (1919)
- The Lord Loves the Irish (1919)
- Diane of the Green Van (1919)
- The Man Who Turned White (1919)
- The Man Beneath (1919)
- A Man's Fight (1919)
- Her Purchase Price (1919)
- Kitty Kelly, M.D. (1919)
- The Beauty Market (1919)
- The Corsican Brothers (1920)
- 813 (1920)
- The Dream Cheater (1920)
- The Match-Breaker (1921)
- Devotion (1921)
- Thelma (1922)
- Ashes (1922)
- The Song of Life (1922)
- A Doll's House (1922)
- Enter Madame (1922)
- Adam's Rib (1923)
- Don't Marry for Money (1923)
- A Wife's Romance (1923)
- Transatlantic Merry-Go-Round (1934)
- Cleopatra (1934)
- Hell Bent for Love (1934)
- The Big Show (1936)
- Theodora Goes Wild (1936) (uncredited)
- Dick Tracy (1937, Serial)
- Racketeers in Exile (1937)
- Stolen Holiday (1937)
- Calling Philo Vance (1940)
- Affectionately Yours (1941)
- Nazty Nuisance (1943)
