= Anything Once =

1917 film

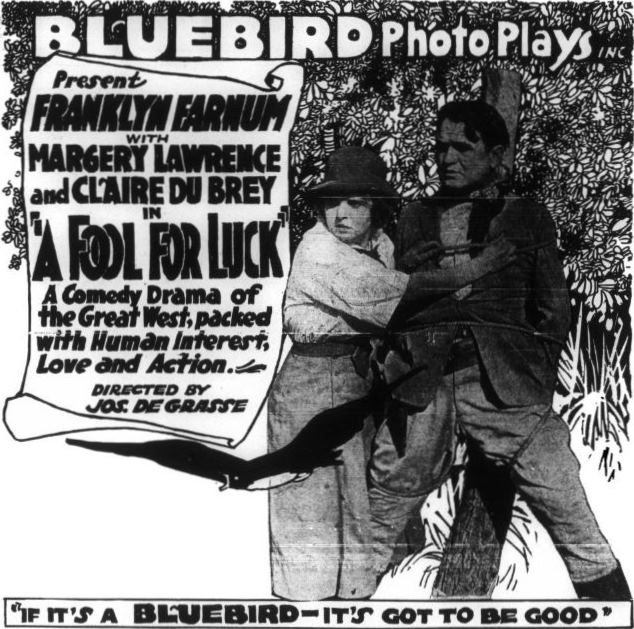
- Advertisement under the film's original working title
- Directed by: Joe De Grasse
- Written by: William Parker (screenplay); Izola Forrester and Mann Page (story)
- Produced by: Jack Weinberg
- Starring: Franklyn Farnum; Lon Chaney
- Cinematography: Jack MacKenzie
- Distributed by: Universal Pictures
- Release date: October 8, 1917
- Running time: 50 minutes
- Country: United States
- Language: Silent (English intertitles)

Anything Once is a 1917 American silent drama film directed by Joe De Grasse and featuring Lon Chaney and Franklyn Farnum. The screenplay was written by William Parker, based on a story by Izola Forrester and Mann Page. It was distributed by Universal Pictures.

The film was originally to be titled A Fool for Luck, but that was too close to the Essanay Taylor Holmes film released in September 1917 titled Fools for Luck, so the Universal production was changed to Anything Once. The film was also referred to as The Maverick and Any Way Once in some reference sources.

== Plot ==
Teddy Crosby has inherited a cattle ranch from his deceased uncle, "Coyote" Crosby, who was shot dead by "Horned Toad" Smith. Teddy will inherit the ranch provided that he lives there and marries his cousin, Dorothy Stuart, within six months.

Waughnt Mohr and his partner are crooked lawyers managing the estate, and they try to frighten Teddy so that he will sell the ranch cheaply. Mohr sends word to Horned Toad Smith that Teddy is arriving soon in Arizona, but Smith pulls his gun on the wrong man who nearly shoots Smith when he turns out to be a faster draw. Teddy saves Smith from being shot, and the two become friends, with Teddy not realizing that Smith is the man who murdered his uncle.

Senorita Dolores, an old flame of Teddy's uncle, goes to New York to try to extort money out of Teddy. Sir Mortimer Beggs, a fortune-hunting Englishman, tries to convince Dorothy that Teddy is carrying on an affair with Senorita Dolores. When Dorothy and her mother learn that Teddy is heading West to the ranch, and that Dolores will be travelling there on the same train, they take off after them. Dorothy finds Dolores comfortably settled at the ranch, and thinking Teddy is cherating on her, she is about to return East when Smith's gang attacks the ranch.

Waughnt Mohr tries to get Dorothy to sign over her interest in the ranch, and tries to have Smith kill Teddy. A gang of Mexicans is sent to capture Dorothy, but when they storm the house and discover the wine cellar, they all get roaring drunk. Dorothy is captured by Pedro, the leader of the gang, but she is rescued by Teddy.

Later Teddy is captured by Smith's gang and is about to be branded, when Dorothy brings the ranch's cowboys to the rescue. The cowboys defeat the gang and they find Horned Toad Smith wrapped in a blanket because Teddy has won all of Smith's clothes in a poker game. Teddy gives Smith a job as foreman of the ranch, and he and Dorothy get married. Smith winds up marrying Senorita Dolores.

== Cast ==
- Franklyn Farnum as Theodore (Teddy) Crosby
- Raymond Wells as Horned Toad Smith
- Marjory Lawrence as Dorothy Stuart
- Lon Chaney as Waughnt Mohr (a play on "Want More")
- Claire Du Brey as Señorita Dolores
- H. M. Thurston as Getting Mohr
- Mary St. John as Mrs. Stuart (Dorothy's mom)
- Sam De Grasse as Sir Mortimer Beggs
- William Dyer as Jethro Quall
- Frank Tokunaga as Algernon
- Eugene Owen as "Coyote" Crosby (Teddy's dead uncle)

== Reception ==
"Nothing is to be taken seriously in ANYTHING ONCE...and everything goes with a slap and a dash and not the slightest heed taken of such a thing as probability." --- Moving Picture World

"A rather confused story, with plenty of action but little plot, is the basis of this latest Franklyn Farnum offering. Some audiences will like it, for it is fairly exciting at times, but very many patrons, especially in the higher class theaters, will be displeased at the story's lack of real humor and cleverness." --- Motography

"This following in the footsteps of Douglas Fairbanks' stuff is beginning to grow a trifle monotonous." --- Variety
