= Worldly Goods =

1924 film by Paul Bern

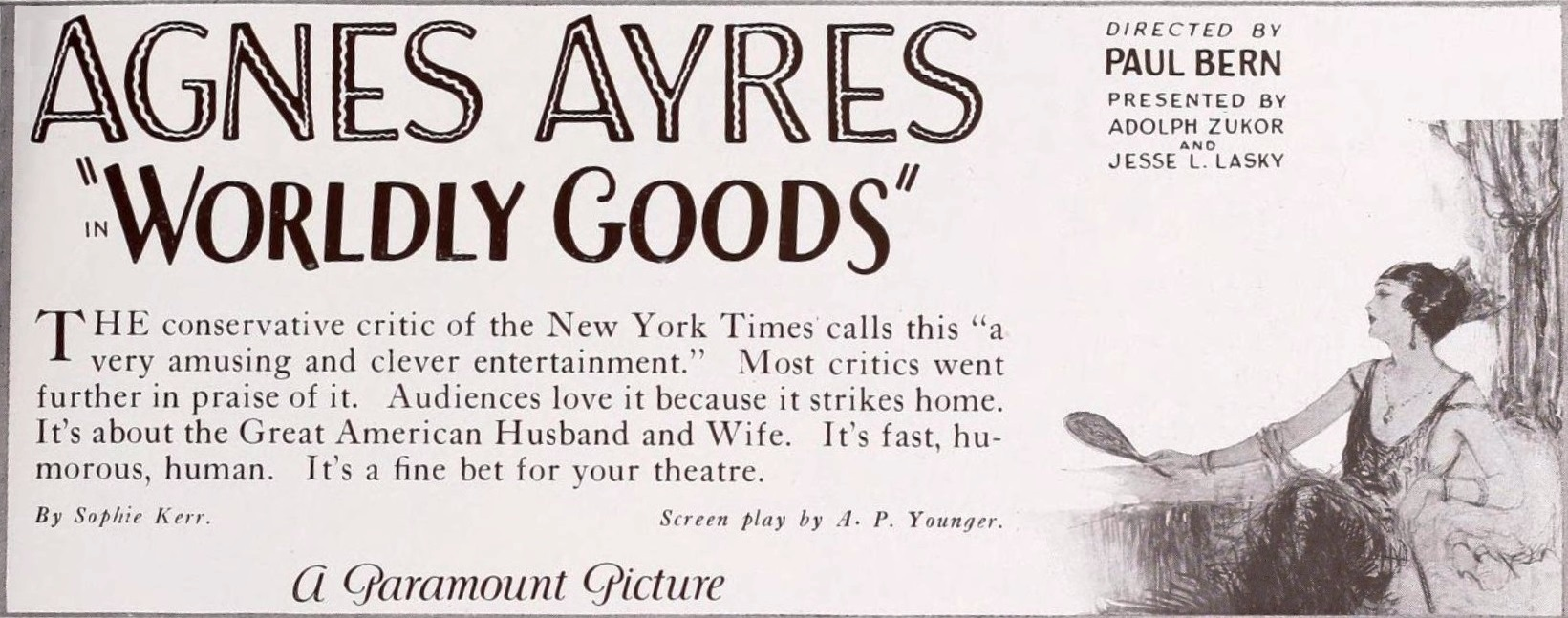
- Advertisement
- Directed by: Paul Bern
- Screenplay by: A. P. Younger
- Based on: "Worldly Goods" by Sophie Kerr
- Produced by: Jesse L. Lasky; Adolph Zukor
- Starring: Agnes Ayres; Patrick H. O'Malley, Jr. Victor Varconi; Edythe Chapman; Bert Woodruff; Maude George; Cecille Evans
- Cinematography: Bert Glennon
- Production company: Famous Players–Lasky Corporation
- Distributed by: Paramount Pictures
- Release date: November 24, 1924
- Running time: 60 minutes
- Country: United States
- Language: Silent (English intertitles)

Worldly Goods is a 1924 American silent comedy film directed by Paul Bern and written by Sophie Kerr and A. P. Younger. The film stars Agnes Ayres, Patrick H. O'Malley, Jr., Victor Varconi, Edythe Chapman, Bert Woodruff, Maude George, and Cecille Evans. The film was released on November 24, 1924, by Paramount Pictures.

== Plot ==
As described in a review in a film magazine, Eleanor Lawson chooses to marry Fred Hopper, a breezy salesman, instead of Clifford Ramsay, the young and wealthy head of a big department store. The honeymoon is hardly over when bill collectors besiege Hopper and his wife learns that he is more talk than industry. They are in a bad way when Eleanor gets work and Hopper decides to ask Clifford Ramsay for a job. He overhears Ramsay discussing the purchase of a site, obtains an option on the property through the loan of money from an infatuated married woman, and cleans up $70,000. In the meantime, Eleanor has left him because of the other woman, but they are reconciled after Ramsay has failed to induce Eleanor to sue for a divorce.

== Cast ==
- Agnes Ayres as Eleanor Lawson
- Patrick H. O'Malley, Jr. as Fred Hopper
- Victor Varconi as Clifford Ramsay
- Edythe Chapman as Mrs. Lawson
- Bert Woodruff as Mr. Lawson
- Maude George as Letitia Calhoun
- Cecille Evans as Vivian Steel
- Otto Lederer as Sol Shipik
- Rosalind Byrne

== Preservation ==
With no prints of Worldly Goods located in any film archives, it is a lost film.
