= F. McGrew Willis =

American screenwriter (1891–1957)

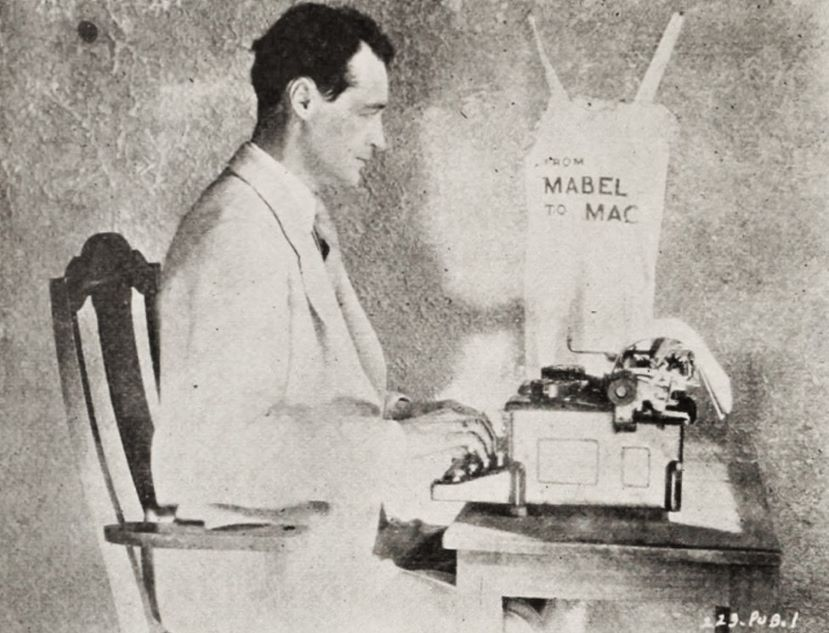
- Working on Up in Mabel's Room (1926)
- Born: Frank McGrew Willis; August 18, 1891; Pleasanton, Iowa, United States
- Died: October 13, 1957 (aged 66); Menlo Park, California, United States
- Occupation: Screenwriter
- Years active: 1919–1944

Frank McGrew Willis (August 18, 1891 – October 13, 1957) was an American screenwriter of the silent and early sound film eras.

Born in Pleasanton, Iowa, he broke into the film industry writing film shorts in 1914 and 1915 as a freelance screenwriter. His first feature credit came in 1915, with The Quest, the first of three features he would pen in 1915. Over the next fourteen years he would write the scripts or stories for 43 silent films, three of which, The Girl in the Pullman (1927), Annapolis (1928), and A Blonde for a Night (1928), he also produced for either De Mille Pictures and/or Pathé Exchange. He would also produce another three films in 1928. In 1929, and through the next 6 years of the blossoming talking picture era, he would write the screenplays or stories for another 18 films. In the late 1930s he would work in England, where he scripted 6 films during the remainder of the decade. His final screenwriting credit would come on 1941's Sis Hopkins, for which he wrote the story. Willis died on October 13, 1957, in Menlo Park, California.

== Filmography ==
The follow list is compiled from the American Film Institute and from period reviews and news items in various film-industry trade publications:

- The Quest (1915)
- John o' the Mountains (1915)
- Tainted Money (1915)
- Business Is Business (1915)
- The Iron Hand (1916)
- The Beckoning Trail (1916)
- The Whirlpool of Destiny (1916)
- The Gay Lord Waring (1916)
- The Pool of Flame (1916)
- The Silent Battle (1916)
- The Way of the World (1916)
- The Book Agent (1917)
- The Flame of Youth (1917)
- To Honor and Obey (1917)
- American Methods (1917)
- Even As You and I (1917)
- The Bride's Awakening (1918)
- A Burglar for a Night (1918)
- The Empty Cab (1918)
- Modern Love (1918)
- The Velvet Hand (1918)
- $5,000 Reward (1918)
- Playthings (1918)
- The End of the Game (1919)
- The Pagan God (1919)
- His Divorced Wife (1919)
- The Phantom Melody (1920)
- The Common Sin (1920)
- Everyman's Price (1921)
- Oliver Twist, Jr. (1921)
- Her Temporary Husband (1923)
- The Light That Failed (1923)
- Reckless Romance (1924)
- Charley's Aunt (1925)
- Madame Behave (1925)
- The Midshipman (1925)
- The Million Dollar Handicap (1925)
- Welcome Home (1925)
- Almost a Lady (1926)
- For Wives Only (1926)
- The Winner (1926)
- The Nervous Wreck (1926)
- Up in Mabel's Room (1926)
- The Night Bride (1927)
- Getting Gertie's Garter (1927)
- The Girl in the Pullman (1927)
- Annapolis (1928)
- A Blonde for a Night (1928)
- Twin Beds (1929)
- Two Weeks Off (1929)
- Charley's Aunt (1930)
- The Costello Case (1930)
- The Big Gamble (1931)
- Suicide Fleet (1931)
- Meet the Wife (1931)
- The Forty-Niners (1932)
- The Gambling Sex (1932)
- The Fighting Gentleman (1932)
- Secret Sinners (1933)
- Kiss of Araby (1933)
- Midshipman Jack (1933)
- When a Man Rides Alone (1933)
- Keep 'Em Rolling (1934)
- Back Page (1934)
- Manhattan Butterfly (1935)
- It's a Small World (1935)
- The Man in the Mirror (1936)
- You Must Get Married (1936)
- Let's Make a Night of It (1937)
- Clothes and the Woman (1937)
- Premiere (1938)
- Murder in Soho (1939)
- Sis Hopkins (1941)
