= The People vs. John Doe =

1916 silent film

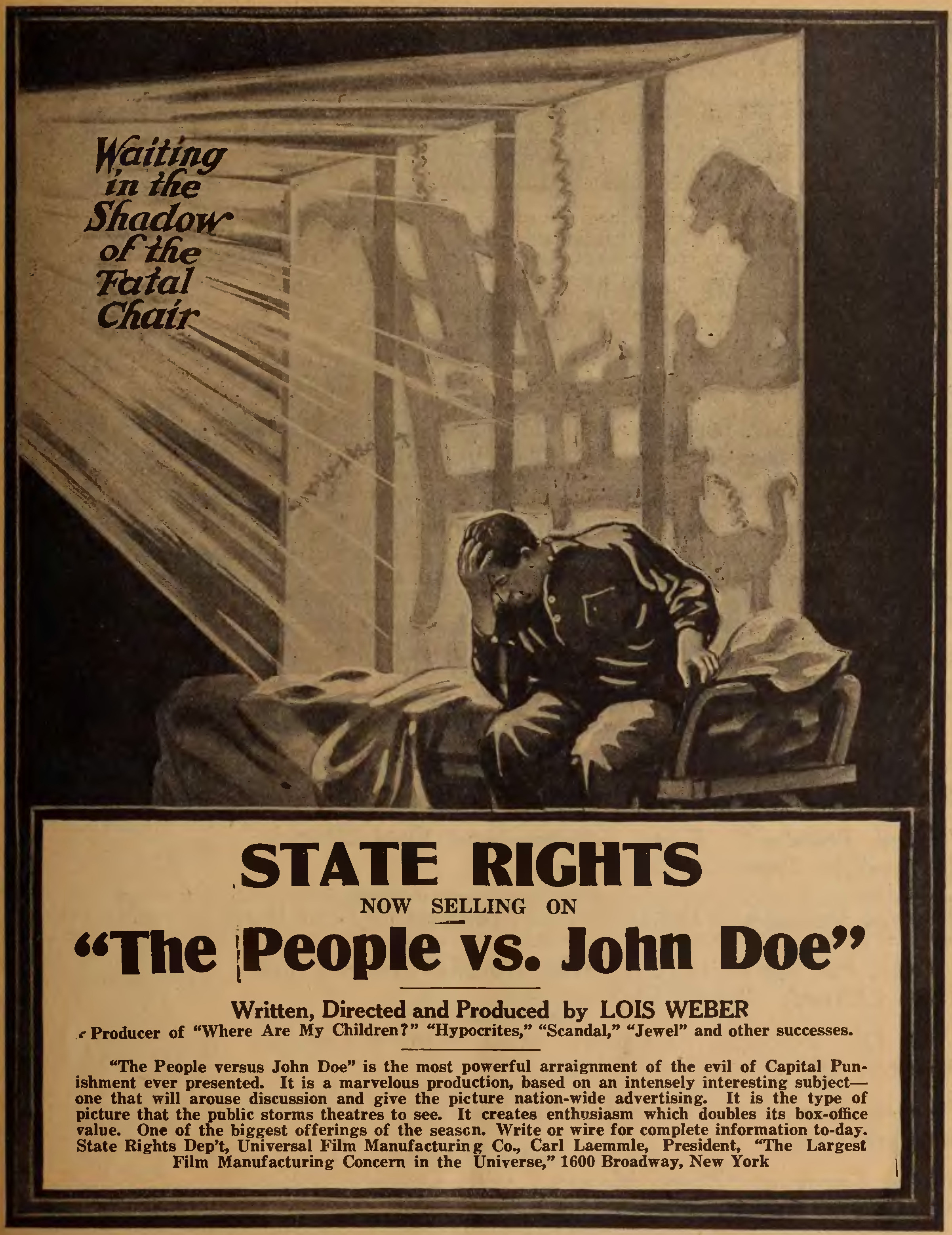
- Directed by: Lois Weber, Phillips Smalley
- Written by: Lois Weber
- Starring: Harry De More; Evelyn Selbie; Willis Marks; Leah Baird; George Berrell; Maude George; Charles Hill Mailes; Robert Smith
- Cinematography: Allen Siegler
- Distributed by: Universal Film Manufacturing Company
- Release date: December 10, 1916
- Running time: 6 reels
- Country: USA
- Language: Silent (English titles)

The People vs. John Doe is a 1916 silent feature film about capital punishment co-directed by Lois Weber and Phillips Smalley. The film was released by Universal Film Manufacturing Company.

== Plot ==
A wealthy farmer and his sister are murdered just days after the man hired an uneducated farmhand (Harry De More). A detective eager to collect reward money (Charles Hill Mailes) brutally forces a confession from the farmhand and his mentally disabled brother. Both men are convicted and sentenced to death. An attorney (Leah Baird) suspects that the men's confessions are false, tracks down the real murderer and saves the men from execution.

== Cast ==
- Harry De More
- Evelyn Selbie
- Willis Marks
- Leah Baird
- George Berrell
- Maude George
- Charles Hill Mailes
- Robert Smith

== Production ==
Lois Weber's script was based on one of the most notorious death penalty cases at the time. Like the character in her film, Charles Stielow was an uneducated farmhand unjustly accused of murder and sentenced to death. Attorney Grace Humiston and suffrage activist Inez Milholland Boissevain were instrumental in efforts to exonerate him. Weber's script was originally called "The Celebrated Stielow Case".

== Release ==
All references to the Charles Stielow case were removed from the film prior to release and the film's title was changed to The People vs. John Doe. Nonetheless, Universal rushed the film into release less than a week after New York governor Charles S. Whitman commuted Stielow's death sentence. Opponents of the death penalty screened the film to draw attention to their cause in New York City and Pennsylvania.
