= 813 (film) =

1920 film by Charles Christie

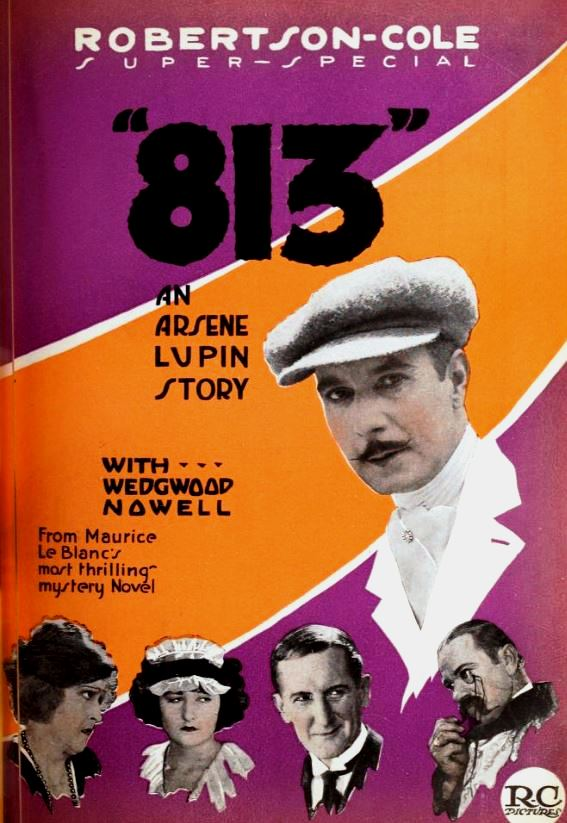
- Advertisement
- Directed by: Charles Christie; Scott Sidney
- Screenplay by: Scott Darling (scenario)
- Story by: Maurice Leblanc
- Produced by: Al Christie
- Starring: Wedgwood Nowell; Ralph Lewis; Wallace Beery; J. P. Lockney; William V. Mong; Colling Kenny; Milton Ross
- Cinematography: Anton Nagy
- Production company: Christie Film Company
- Distributed by: Robertson-Cole Pictures Corporation
- Release date: 1920
- Running time: 6 reels
- Country: United States
- Language: Silent (English intertitles)

813 is a lost 1920 American silent mystery film directed by Charles Christie and Scott Sidney, written by Scott Darling from the 1910 story by Maurice Leblanc, produced by Al Christie, released by the Christie Film Company and the Robertson-Cole Pictures Corporation, and starring Wedgwood Nowell as jewel thief Arsene Lupin with a supporting cast featuring Ralph Lewis, Wallace Beery, and Laura La Plante.

== Plot ==
As summarized in a film publication, Robert Castleback has plans for worldwide power through a mysterious secret that he possesses. Arsene Lupin, master thief but loyal Frenchman, knows of the secret and is attempting to obtain state papers held by Castleback. Two other persons in the employ of the Kaiser are attempting the same thing. Castleback is murdered and some suspect Lupin, who announces his intention to catch the real killer. Disguised as the chief of police, he works fearlessly alongside the police. Soon he comes into contact with another master criminal, Ribeira, who is masquerading as Maj. Parbury, and Lupin suspects that he is complicit in the crime. Lupin falls in love with Dolores Castleback, widow of the murdered man. When Ribeira, to get rid of Lupin, steals his daughter and informs Lupin that he will have to go alone to a deserted house to get her back, Lupin goes, foils the plot to kill him, and escapes through a tunnel that comes out in the home of Dolores. As he turns from the mantelpiece where he has discovered the hiding place of the state papers, he sees a mysterious man that he has been trailing. To Lupin's horror he finds that the man is really Dolores, who is in reality a German criminal. She kills herself and Lupin escapes.

== Cast ==
- Wedgwood Nowell as Arsene Lupin
- Ralph Lewis as Robert Castleback
- Wallace Beery as Maj. Parbury / Ribeira
- J.P. Lockney as Formerie
- William V. Mong as Chapman
- Colin Kenny as Gerard Beaupre
- Milton Ross as Gourel
- Thornton Edwards as Doudeville
- Frederick Vroom as Prefect of Police
- Mark Fenton as Marco
- Kathryn Adams as Dolores Castleback
- Laura La Plante as Genevieve
- Vera Steadman as Vashti Seminoff
- Gonzalo Meroño as Richard Steward

== Preservation ==
With no holdings located in archives, 813 is considered a lost film.
