= The Flower of Doom =

1917 film by Rex Ingram

- Directed by: Rex Ingram
- Written by: Rex Ingram (scenario)
- Starring: Wedgwood Nowell; Yvette Mitchell; Nicholas Dunaew
- Cinematography: Duke Hayward
- Production company: Universal Film Manufacturing Company
- Distributed by: Universal Film Manufacturing Company
- Release date: April 16, 1917
- Running time: approximately 70 minutes
- Country: United States
- Languages: Silent; English intertitles

The Flower of Doom is a 1917 American silent drama film written and directed by Rex Ingram and starring Wedgwood Nowell, Yvette Mitchell and Nicholas Dunaew. A reporter has to rescue a singer kidnapped in Chinatown.

== Cast ==
- Wedgwood Nowell as Sam Savinsky
- Yvette Mitchell as Tea Rose
- Nicholas Dunaew as Paul Rasnov
- M. K. Wilson as Harvey Pearson
- Gypsy Hart as Neeva Sacon
- Tommy Morrissey as Buck
- Frank Tokunaga as Charley Sing
- Goro Kino as Ah Wong (as Gordo Keeno)
- Evelyn Selbie as Arn Fun

== Preservation status ==
The film has been preserved from a 35mm nitrate print by George Eastman House and the UCLA Film & Television Archive.
