= Charles Cummings (actor) =

American actor

- Occupation: film actor
- Years active: 1913–1917

Charles Cummings (c. 1870, Indiana – October 4, 1918, Los Angeles, California) was an early American actor.

He starred in 16 films between 1913 and 1917 in films such as Rose of San Juan and American Born with actors such as Harry von Meter and Louise Lester.

== Filmography ==
- American Born (1913)
- Rose of San Juan (1913)
- The Substitute Jewel (1915)
- The Disappearing Necklace (1915)
- Mysteries of the Grand Hotel (1915)
- The Strangler's Cord (1915)
- The Mother Call (1916)
- Circumstantial Guilt (1916)
- When He Came Back (1916)
- Behind Life's Stage (1916)
- The Chalice of Sorrow (1916), a.k.a. The Fatal Promise (UK), Marion Leslie
- The Little Mascot (1916)
- The Right Man (1917)
- Jerry's Trial (1917)
- The Hidden Children (1917), Guy Johnson
- Heart Strings (1917), Hartley
