= So This Is Marriage =

1924 film by Hobart Henley

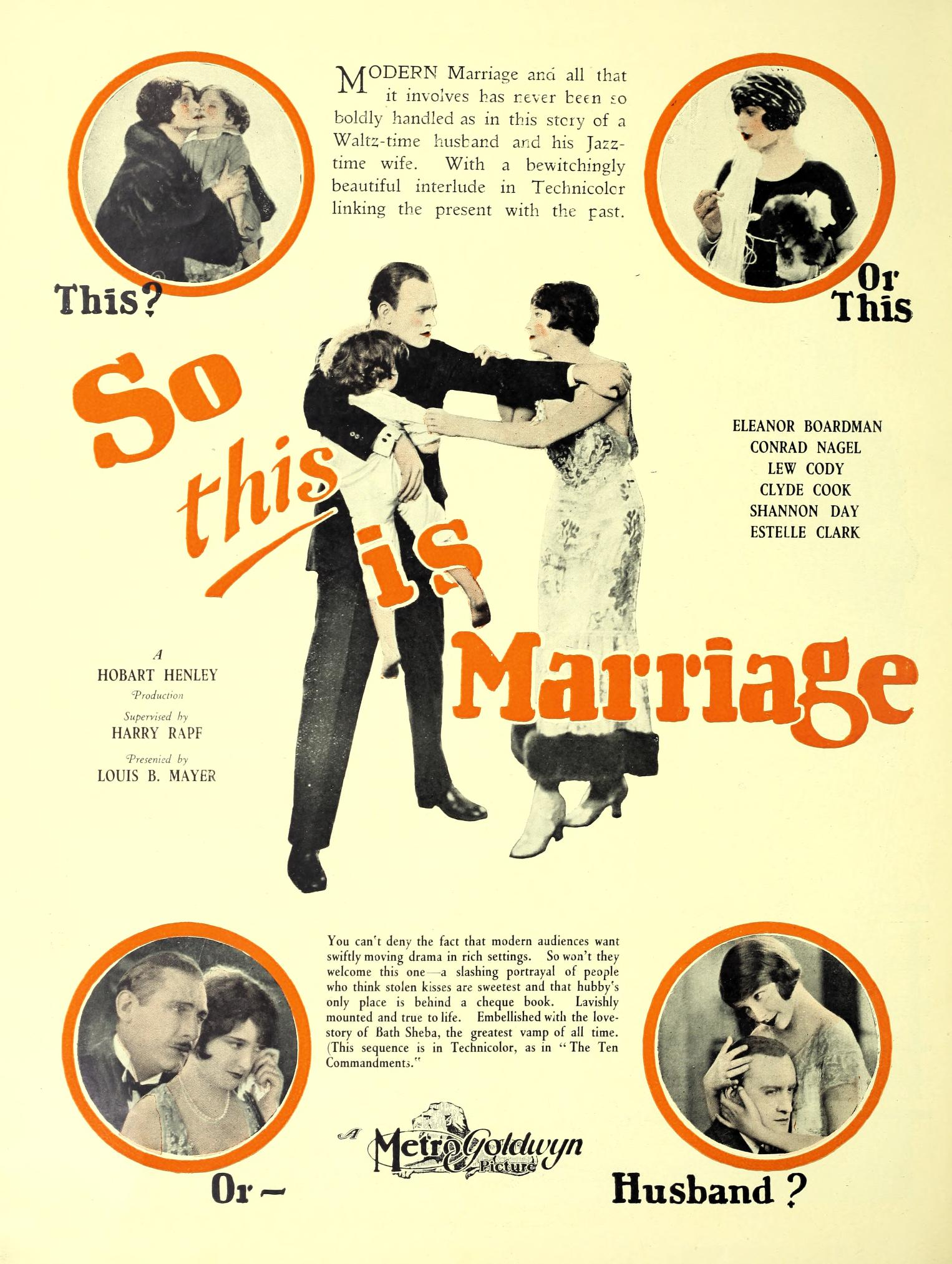
- Australian advertisement from MGM press book
- Directed by: Hobart Henley
- Written by: John Lynch; Alice D. G. Miller
- Starring: Conrad Nagel; Eleanor Boardman
- Cinematography: John Arnold
- Distributed by: Metro-Goldwyn-Mayer
- Release date: November 24, 1924
- Running time: 70 minutes
- Country: United States
- Language: Silent (English intertitles)

So This Is Marriage is a lost 1924 American silent drama film directed by Hobart Henley. The film was originally released with sequences filmed in the Technicolor 2-color process that depicted the story of David and Bathsheba from the Book of Samuel.

== Plot ==
As described in a review in a film magazine, after their engagement, where he dreams of wealth and power, a big house full of boys, and she of clothes, Peter Marsh (Nagel) marries Beth (Boardman) and their troubles begin. Beth is extravagant and Peter becomes irritated and they have frequent rows. Peter prospers in business yet has a hard time meeting their bills. Rankin (Cody), a connoisseur of women, sees Beth and frames-up an accident to her car so he can come to her assistance. Finally, he invites her to a dance and Peter, who has chided her regarding this acquaintance as he sees how Rankin is endeavoring to win his wife, orders her not to go. She goes anyway and they have a terrible row. Beth leaves and goes to Rankin who, finding that she still loves her husband, tells her the story of the woe that befell King David (Oland) and Bathsheba (Scott) because of their forbidden love. Beth sees the point and goes back to her husband and baby, while Rankin prepares for other conquests.

== Cast ==
- Conrad Nagel as Peter Marsh
- Eleanor Boardman as Beth Marsh
- Lew Cody as Daniel Rankin
- Clyde Cook as Mr. Brown
- Edward Connelly as Nathan
- John Boles as Uriah
- Warner Oland as King David
- Mabel Julienne Scott as Bath-Sheba
- Miss DuPont as Vera Kellogg
- John Patrick as Augustus Sharp
- Claire de Lorez as Mrs. Stuyvesant Lane
- Shannon Day as Mollie O'Brien
- Jack Edwards as Bobbie
- Estelle Clark as Maid
- Thelma Morgan as Theress
- Francis McDonald as Smith
- Eugenia Gilbert as Dorothy Pringle (credited as Eugenie Gilbert)
- Sidney Bracey as Hawkins
- Tom O'Brien as Riley
- Philip Sleeman as Donald Gibson
- Anne Sheridan as Daisy de Belle (credited as Gloria Heller)
- William H. Crane
- Huntley Gordon
- William Haines
- Norman Kerry
- Louis Payne
- Rosalind Byrne

== Preservation ==
With no copies or prints of So This Is Marriage located in any film archives, it is a lost film. The last known copy of this film was destroyed in the 1965 MGM vault fire.

== See also ==
- List of early color feature films
