= The Yellow Stain =

1922 drama film

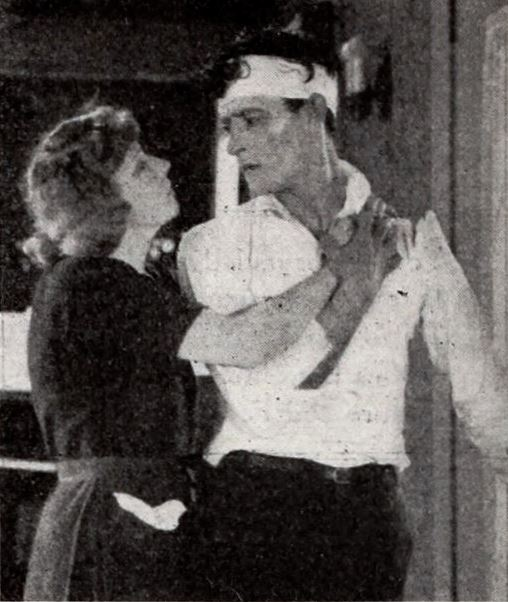
- A still from the film.
- Directed by: John Dillon
- Written by: Jules Furthman
- Starring: John Gilbert; Claire Anderson
- Cinematography: Don Short
- Production company: Fox Film Corporation
- Distributed by: Fox Film Corporation
- Release date: May 21, 1922
- Running time: 5 reels
- Country: United States
- Language: Silent (English intertitles)

The Yellow Stain is a lost 1922 silent drama film released by Fox Film Corporation. The film stars John Gilbert and Claire Anderson. It is not known whether the film currently survives.

== Plot ==
Donald Keith is a lawyer who has recently moved to a fictional logging community in Northern Michigan. He later learns that Quartus Hembly, the town boss, has illegally conned a man named Daniel Kersten out of his property, ruining him and turning him into the town drunkard. Keith decides to help Kersten take legal action against Hembly and bring him to justice. Keith eventually succeeds and also causes the town's residents to rise up against Hembly.

== Cast ==
- John Gilbert as Donald Keith
- Claire Anderson as Thora Erickson
- Mark Fenton as Olaf Erickson
- John P. Lockney as Quartus Hembly
- Herschel Mayall as Dr. Brown
- William Robert Daly as Daniel Kersten
- Mace Robinson as Lyman Rochester
- James McElhern as Clerk
- Frank Hemphill as Pete Borg
- May Alexander as Mrs. Borg
