= The Marriage Lie =

- Directed by: Stuart Paton
- Written by: Harvey Gates
- Starring: Carmel Myers; Kenneth Harlan; Harry Carter
- Cinematography: Duke Hayward
- Production company: Bluebird Photoplays
- Distributed by: Universal Pictures
- Release date: April 27, 1918
- Running time: 50 minutes
- Country: United States
- Languages: Silent; English intertitles

The Marriage Lie is a 1918 American silent drama film directed by Stuart Paton and starring Carmel Myers, Kenneth Harlan and Harry Carter. Prints and/or fragments were found in the Dawson Film Find in 1978.

== Cast ==
- Carmel Myers as Eileen Orton
- Kenneth Harlan as Douglas Seward
- Harry Carter as Terence Carver
- William Quinn as 'Parson' Dye
- Joseph W. Girard as Jim Orton

== Bibliography ==
- Leonhard Gmür. Rex Ingram: Hollywood's Rebel of the Silver Screen. 2013.
