= Dawson Film Find =

1978 discovery of 533 silent-era films

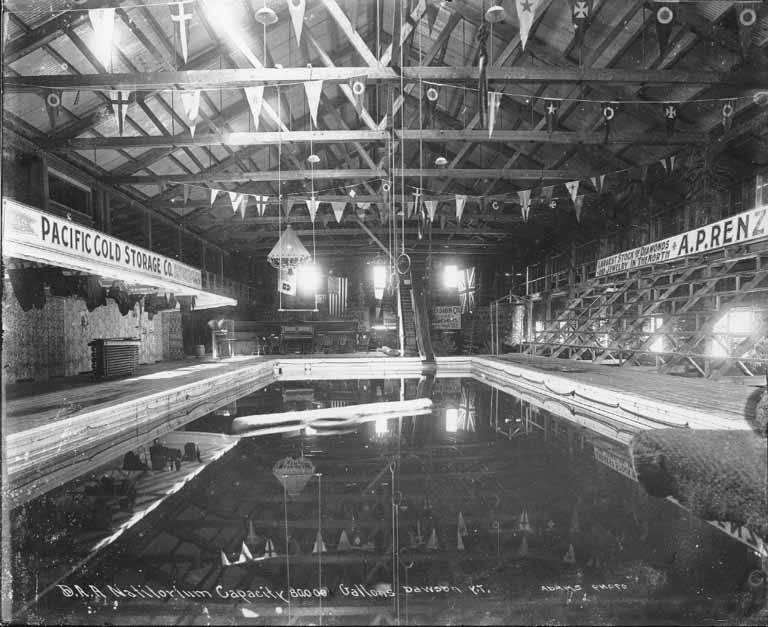
DAAA "natatorium" probably photographed between 1902 and 1910

The Dawson Film Find (DFF) was the accidental discovery in 1978 of 372 film titles preserved in 533 reels of silent-era nitrate films in the Klondike Gold Rush town of Dawson City, Yukon, Canada. The reels had been buried under an abandoned hockey rink in 1929 and included lost films of feature movies and newsreels. A construction excavation inadvertently uncovered the forgotten cache of discarded films, which were unintentionally preserved by the permafrost.

The 2016 documentary Dawson City: Frozen Time details the history and recovery of the films, and features footage restored from the reels. The DFF is also featured in the 2013 documentary short Lost Forever: The Art of Film Preservation.

== Description ==
The 533 film reels date "between 1903 and 1929 and were uncovered in the rubble beneath [an] old hockey rink". Films starring Pearl White, Helen Holmes, Grace Cunard, Lois Weber, Fatty Arbuckle, Harold Lloyd, Douglas Fairbanks, and Lon Chaney, among others, were among the find. Along with the lost feature films, there was also rare footage of historic events, including the 1919 World Series.

== History ==
Beginning in 1903, the Dawson Amateur Athletic Association (DAAA) began showing films in Dawson City, Yukon, Canada. The unreturned films were deposited in the local Canadian Bank of Commerce and later stored in the local Carnegie Library basement. The DAAA later converted a swimming pool to an ice rink, but because of improper conversion the ice rink suffered from uneven temperatures in the middle of the rink. In 1929, Clifford Thomson, then employed by the Canadian Bank of Commerce and also treasurer of the hockey association, solved the problem of the library's stock of film and the inadequate ice rink. Thomson took 500,000 feet of film and stacked the reels in the pool, covered the reels with boards and leveled the rink with a layer of earth. The DAAA continued to receive new nitrate films which would later fuel the destruction of the entire complex in a fire in 1951. The films stored under the ice rink were preserved by permafrost and were later uncovered in 1978 when a new recreation center was being built.

The Dawson Film Find material was collected and preserved, with these prints becoming the last surviving records of some movie studios. Owing to its dangerous chemical volatility, the historical find was moved by military transport to Library and Archives Canada and the U.S. Library of Congress for both transfer to safety film and storage.

== Films found ==
Not all films are complete, as some were too damaged to restore in their entirety.

- The Office Boy's Birthday (1904)
- A Trip through Palestine (1907)
- Elephant Racing at Perak (1907)
- Pasquali and Co (1909)
- Professor Puddenhead's Patents: The Electric Enlager (1909)
- The Girl of the Northern Woods (1910), Thanhouser
- The Crippled Teddy Bear (1910), Independent Moving Pictures
- Unexpected Help (1910)
- Bluebird - The Boy Girl (1910)
- The Rosary (1910)
- His Sick Friend (1910)
- Birth of Flowers (1911)
- The Taming of the Shrew (1911)
- Vindicated (1911)
- Little Old New York (1911)
- The New Woman and The Lion (1912)
- Bobby's Dream (1912)
- For the Papoose (1912)
- Circumstantial Evidence (1912), William Selig, Selig Polyscope Company
- A Christmas Accident (1912)
- Out of the Deep End (1912)
- The Martyrs (1912)
- His Madonna (1912)
- This Girls of Grassville (1912)
- The Frog (1912)
- A Windy Day (1912)
- The Debt (1912)
- Out of the Deep (1912)
- The Heat Wave (1912)
- The Golden Curl (1912)
- For Professional Services (1912)
- The Hand of Destiny (1912)
- Giuseppe’s Good Fortune (1912)
- Circumstantial Evidence (1912)
- A Winter's visit to Central Park, New York City (1912)
- The Butler and the Maid (1912), Thomas A. Edison, Inc.
- The Mystery of the Glass Coffin (1912), Émile Chautard
- Brutality (1912), D. W. Griffith, Biograph Company
- Casey's Vendetta (1912), Edward Dillon, Komic Film Company
- The $2,500 Bride (1912)
- The Sphinx, or Mrs. Carter's Necklace (1912)
- Pansy, the Story of a Bear (1912)
- Bread Upon the Waters (1912)
- The Lake Geneva Camp of the YMCA (1912)
- The Angel of The Desert (1912), Rollin S. Sturgeon, Grace A. Pierce, Vitagraph Company Of America
- Draga, the Gypsy (1913), Rex Motion Picture Company
- Until We Three Meet Again (1913?), Lubin Film
- What Is the Use of Repining (1913)
- The Pit and The Pendulum (1913)
- Balaoo (1913), Victorin-Hippolyte Jasset, Société Française des Films Éclair
- Fatty's Day Off (1913)
- Hello Central, Give Me Heaven (1913)
- A Mix-Up In Pedigrees (1913)
- The Rose of San Juan (1913)
- The Pajama Parade (1913)
- The Fifth String (1913)
- The Guiding Light (1913)
- The Wedding Gown (1913)
- The Star (1913)
- Leo the Indian (1913)
- Up and Down the Ladder (1913)
- Sketches from Life (1913)
- Rastus and the Game-Cock (1913)
- Pure Gold and Dross (1913), Keystone Film Company
- Protecting San Francisco from Fire (1913)
- Pathé's Weekly #17 (1914)
- Daybreak (1914), Reliance Entertainment
- White Dove's Sacrifice (1914)
- Love Finds a Way (1914)
- Frou-Frou (1914)
- Slippery Slim, the Mortgage, and Sophie (1914)
- The Master Hand (1914)
- The Tie that Binds (1914)
- The New Roads Mascot (1914)
- Sweeney's Christmas Bird (1914)
- Environment (1914)
- The Boss of the 8th (1914)
- The Housebreakers (1914)
- You Can't Beat Them (1914)
- His Responsibility (1914)
- Mildred's Doll (1914)
- The Servant Girl's Legacy (1914)
- For Her Father's Sins (1914), John B. O'Brien, Anita Loos, Majestic Motion Picture Company
- A Double Error (1914), Theodore Marston
- The Demon of the Rails (1914), J. P. McGowan, Edward W Matlack, Kalem Company
- Lucille Love, the Girl of Mystery (1914), Francis Ford, Grace Cunard, Otis Turner, Universal Film Manufacturing Studios, Gold Seal Films
- The Fable of the Household Comedian (1914?), George Ade, Essanay Studios
- The Fable of Why Essie's Friend Got the Fresh Air (1914?)
- The Fable of the Prevailing Craze (1914?)
- Wildfire (1915)
- The Scandal Mongers (1915)
- The Bludgeon (1915)
- The Price (1915)
- Her Shattered Idol (1915)
- The Shulamite (1915), George Loane Tucker, Kenelm Foss, Jury's Imperial Pictures
- The Heart of Jabez Flint (1915)
- The Hazards of Helen: Escape of the Fast Freight (1915)
- Tools of Providence (1915)
- The Quest (1915)
- No Soup (1915)
- The Unpardonable Sin (1915), Shubert Film Corporation
- The Patriot and the Spy (1915)
- The Lure of a Woman (1915)
- The Mysterious Lady Baffles and Detective Duck: Episode 1, The Great Egg Robbery (1915), Allen Curtis, Clarence Badger
- Fun Amongst the Pharaohs, As Seen by Homer Croy (1915)
- The Dancer's Ruse (1915), Biograph Company
- Ambrose's Lofty Perch (1915), Mack Sennett
- The Child Needs a Mother (1915), L-KO Kompany
- The Salamander, Part Five (1915), B.S. Moss Motion Picture Corporation
- The Burglar's Baby (1915), Domino Motion Picture Corporation
- With the U.S. Army at San Francisco (1915?)
- The Half-Breed (1916), Allan Dwan, Triangle
- The End of the Rainbow (1916)
- The Crimson Stain Mystery [Assorted Episodes] (1916)
- The Rail Rider (1916)
- The Mysterious Mrs. M (1916)
- Love Aflame (1917)
- The Madcap (1916)
- Diplomacy (1916)
- The Whirlpool of Destiny (1916)
- Threads of Fate (1916)
- The Place Beyond the Winds (1916)
- Love and Brass Buttons (1916)
- The Female of the Species (1916), Raymond B. West, Monte Katterjohn, New York Motion Picture Company
- The Hidden Scar (1916)
- Her Soul's Inspiration (1916), Maie B. Havey, Bluebird Photoplays
- Gloriana (1916)
- Temperance Town (1916)
- The Purple Mask (1916)
- The Seekers (1916)
- The Unattainable (1916)
- Pearl of the Army (1916)
- If My Country Should Call (1916)
- The Vicar of Wakefield (1916)
- The Salamander (1916)
- The Closer Road (1916)
- The Iron Hand (1916)
- Barriers of Society (1916)
- The Social Buccaneer (1916), Jack Conway
- The Strange Case of Mary Page (1916), J. Charles Haydon
- The Girl and the Game (1916)
- Rolling Stones (1916)
- When Little Lindy Sang (1916)
- Tropical Budget Animated News of the World (1916)
- The Recoil (1917)
- Bliss (1917)
- Polly of the Circus (1917)
- The Stolen Paradise (1917)
- It Happened to Adele (1917)
- The Little Orphan (1917)
- A Soul for Sale (1917)
- Princess Virtue (1917)
- The Red Ace (1917)
- A Girl's Folly (1917), Maurice Tourneur, Paragon Films
- An Even Break (1917)
- Chicken Casey (1917)
- Negroes' Protest: a Silent Parade (1917) Universal Animated Weekly (newsreel)
- The Awakening (1917)
- The Hunting of the Hawk (1917)
- The Spotted Lily (1917)
- Little Bo Peep (1917)
- The Recoil (1917)
- The Mystery of the Double Cross (1917)
- The Great Stanley Secret (1917), Edward Sloman, American Film Manufacturing Company
- The Neglected Wife (1917), Will M. Ritchey, Mabel Herbert Urner, Balboa Amusement Producing Company
- The Seven Pearls (1917), Astra Film Corp
- The Marriage Lie (1918)
- Bread (1918)
- Waifs (1918)
- Stolen Hours (1918)
- Avenged by the Sea (1918/1922)
- The Sea Waif (1918)
- British War Office (1918)
- The Lightning Raider (1918)
- Do Husbands Deceive? (1918), Rolin Film Company
- British Canadian Pathé News 81A (1919)
- British Canadian Pathé News 93A (1919)
- International News, Vol. 1, Issue 52 (1919)
- The Montreal Herald Screen Magazine (1919)
- All Jazzed Up (1919)
- A Sagebrush Hamlet (1919)
- The Silver Girl (1919)
- The Exquisite Thief (1919), Tod Browning, Universal Film Manufacturing Company, Inc.
- The Nights of the Bathtub, Part Two (1919?)
- British Canadian Pathé News 14A (1920)
- British Canadian Pathé News 76 (1920)
- British Canadian Pathé News 88 (1920)
- Birth of Flowers (1920/1922)
- The Little Clown (1920)
- Unidentified Pathé Melodrama (1920/1922)
- British Canadian Pathé News 63B (1921)
- British Canadian Pathé News 2B (1921)
- Boxing Match
- Frivolity
- Screen Telegram
- The Princess and the Fishbone
- A Mix-Up at Court
- A Set of Teeth
- Through the Keyhole
- The Lake of Dreams
- The Marriage of Coca
- The Red Feather
- An Excursion to the Gorges du Loup
- Dread of Doom, Itala Film
- The Plumber's Son, Part One, Universal Pictures

== See also ==
- List of hoards in North America
