= The Iron Hand =

1916 film by Ulysses Davis

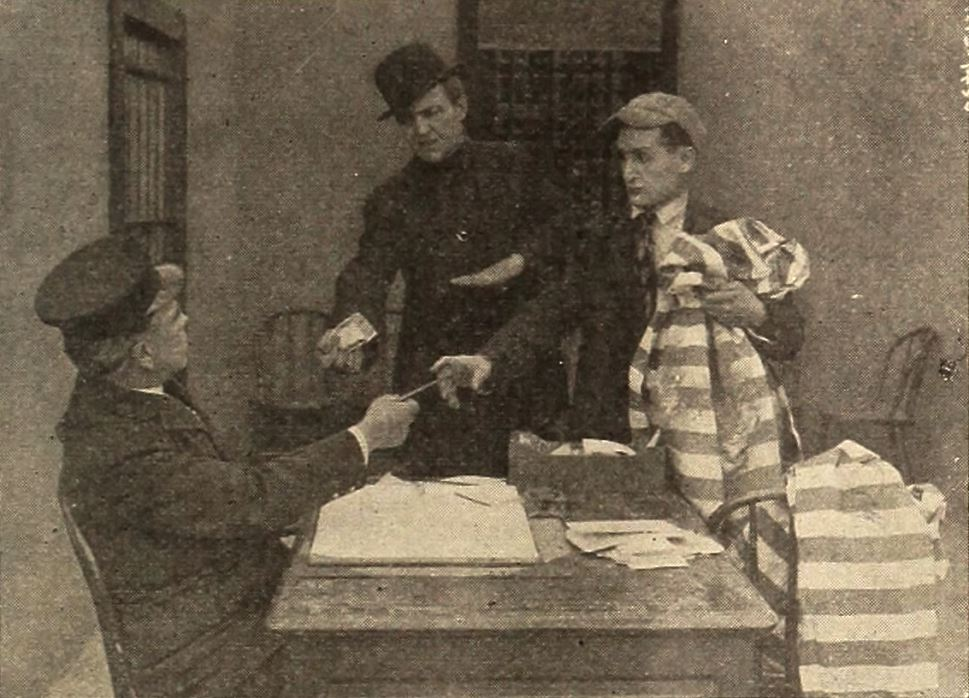
- A still from the film
- Directed by: Ulysses Davis
- Screenplay by: F. McGrew Willis
- Story by: George E. Hall
- Starring: Edward Clark; Hobart Bosworth; Jack Curtis
- Production company: Universal Film Manufacturing Company
- Distributed by: Universal Film Manufacturing Company
- Release date: May 29, 1916
- Running time: 5 reels
- Country: United States
- Language: Silent (English intertitles)

The Iron Hand is a 1916 drama film directed by Ulysses Davis. It is not known whether the film currently survives.

== Plot ==
Politician Tim Noland, and his companion Slim are both arrested. When they are both arrested, Noland decides to stop being a criminal, while Slim does not. Slim dies, and Tim adopts his son, Roy. Noland allows a doctor to raise Roy after he promises that raising him in a crime-free environment will allow him to grow up to be a law-abiding adult. Twenty years later, Roy falls in love with and becomes engaged to Enid Winslow, a social reformer who is the daughter of Mr. Winslow, a politician running against Tim in an election. Mr. Winslow wins the election, but he refuses to let Enid marry Roy. Mr. Winslow eventually allows the wedding to proceed after Tim offers to pay for his campaign debts.

== Cast ==
- Edward Clark as Jerry Simpson
- Hobart Bosworth as Tim Noland
- Jack Curtis as Connors
- William V. Mong as Slim
- Maude George as Slim's wife
- Frank Newburg as Roy
- Winifred Harris as Mr. Winslow
- Jane Novak as Enid Winslow
