= The Hand That Rocks the Cradle (1917 film) =

1917 film by Lois Weber and Phillips Smalley

- Directed by: Phillips Smalley; Lois Weber
- Written by: Phillips Smalley; Lois Weber
- Produced by: Phillips Smalley; Lois Weber
- Starring: Phillips Smalley; Lois Weber; Priscilla Dean; Wedgwood Nowell; Evelyn Selbie; Harry De More
- Cinematography: Allen G. Siegler
- Distributed by: Universal Film Manufacturing Company
- Release date: May 13, 1917
- Country: United States
- Language: Silent (English intertitles)

The Hand That Rocks the Cradle is an American silent drama film released in 1917. It was written, produced and directed by the husband and wife team Phillips Smalley and Lois Weber, who also play the lead roles. It was made in Hollywood under the working title Is a Woman a Person?

The plot follows the careers of a husband and wife pair of activists campaigning for sex education and family planning. The events in the film were largely inspired by the trial of Margaret Sanger.

The film was an unofficial sequel to Where Are My Children?, a 1916 film by the same team, and has been classified as a lost film. It was not a commercial success upon its release, and Weber later claimed to be unhappy with the finished product.

== Synopsis ==
Mrs. Broome (Weber) is under surveillance by the police because of her efforts to educate women about birth control. Eventually she is arrested, but through the connections of her doctor husband (Smalley), she is released. In a discussion with another couple, the Grahams (Priscilla Dean and Wedgewood Nowell), Mrs. Broome tells the story of a servant, Sarah (Evelyn Selbie), and her husband (Harry deMore) who had more children than they could support. Once again, while she is holding a meeting, Mrs. Broome is arrested. She stages a hunger strike, and again is pardoned.

== Cast ==
- Phillips Smalley as Dr. Broome
- Lois Weber as Mrs. Broome
- Priscilla Dean as Mrs. Graham
- Wedgwood Nowell as Mr. Graham
- Evelyn Selbie as Sarah
- Harry De More as Sarah's Husband
- Josephine Myers as child girl
