= Bliss (1917 film) =

1917 film

- Directed by: Alfred J. Goulding
- Produced by: Hal Roach
- Starring: Harold Lloyd
- Cinematography: Walter Lundin
- Edited by: Della Mullady
- Music by: Borodin and Bach
- Release date: October 14, 1917
- Country: United States
- Language: Silent with English intertitles

Bliss is a 1917 American short comedy film featuring Harold Lloyd. The film was thought lost until a copy was discovered in the Dawson Film Find in 1978.

== Plot ==
Harold and Bebe meet each other by chance while out walking. Equally smitten, they exchange calling cards. Harold is a man of modest means while the well-to-do Bebe is "the most eligible girl in town." Bebe is besieged by wealthy suitors but none of them measure up to her father's standards; he insists his future son-in-law be of noble blood. Harold rents evening clothes from his laundry man before heading off to Bebe's house to woo her. When he arrives, Bebe's father assumes Harold is another unsuitable beau and attempts to violently eject him from the house. Bebe intervenes. Harold happens to find a calling card in his suit pocket bearing the name "Count Rusva" on it, which convinces Bebe's father that Harold is prime husband material for his daughter. Wanting his daughter to marry Harold quickly, Bebe's father tricks the two of them into thinking each wants to elope. They quickly head to the nearest pastor and are wed.

== Cast ==
- Harold Lloyd as Harold
- Snub Pollard as Snub
- Bebe Daniels as The Girl
- Gus Leonard
- Belle Mitchell

== See also ==
- List of American films of 1917
- List of rediscovered films
