= Langdon's Legacy =

1916 silent film

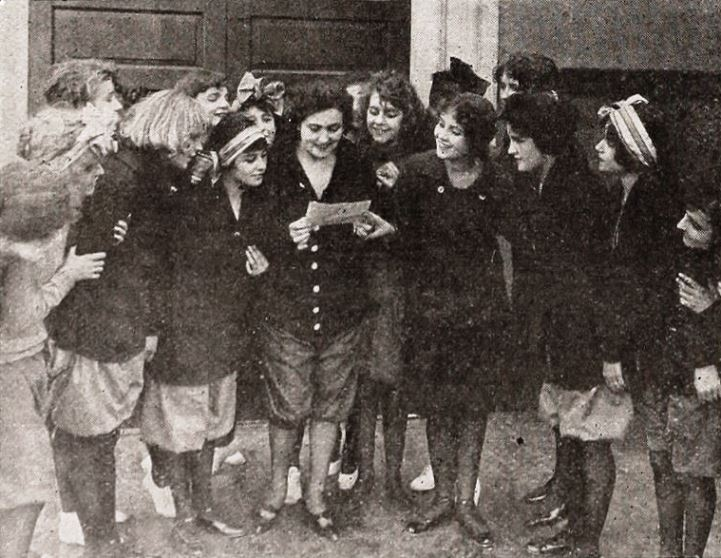
- Film still
- Directed by: Otis Turner
- Written by: Meredith Nicholson
- Produced by: Carl Laemmle
- Starring: J. Warren Kerrigan
- Distributed by: Universal Film Manufacturing Company
- Release date: January 3, 1916
- Running time: 5 reels
- Country: United States
- Language: Silent (English intertitles)

Langdon's Legacy is a lost 1916 silent comedy-drama film directed by Otis Turner and starring J. Warren Kerrigan and Lois Wilson. It was produced and distributed by Universal Film Manufacturing Company.

== Cast ==
- J. Warren Kerrigan as Jack Langdon
- Bertram Grassby as Juan Maria Barada
- Lois Wilson as Pepita
- Maude George as Senorita Del Deros
- Harry Carter as Miguel Alba
- George A. Williams as Mr. Thompson
- Mae Talbot as Mrs. Thompson
- Vera Sisson (unconfirmed)
- George Periolat (unconfirmed)
