= The Silent Battle (1916 film) =

1916 American silent drama film

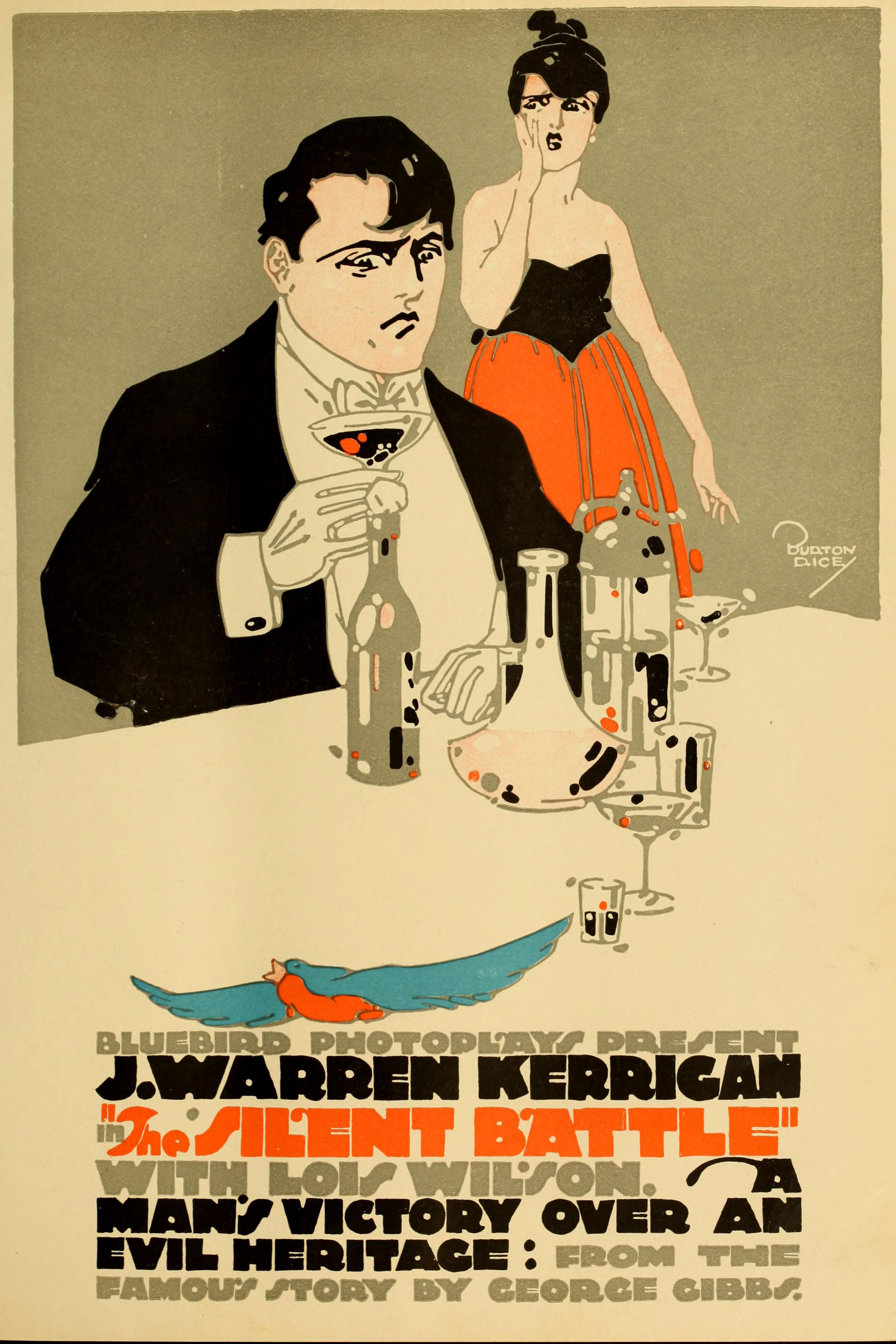
- Directed by: Jack Conway
- Written by: George Gibbs (novel); F. McGrew Willis
- Starring: J. Warren Kerrigan; Lois Wilson; Maude George
- Cinematography: Duke Hayward
- Production company: Universal Pictures
- Distributed by: Universal Pictures
- Release date: July 24, 1916
- Running time: 50 minutes
- Country: United States
- Languages: Silent; English intertitles

The Silent Battle is a 1916 American silent drama film directed by Jack Conway and starring J. Warren Kerrigan, Lois Wilson and Maude George.

== Cast ==
- J. Warren Kerrigan as Tom Gallatin
- Lois Wilson as Jane Loring
- Maude George as Nina Jaffray
- Harry Carter as Coleman Van Duyn
- Ray Hanford as John Kenyon
- Jack Connolly as James Loring

== Bibliography ==
- Langman, Larry. American Film Cycles: The Silent Era. Greenwood Publishing, 1998.
