= The Fatal Sign =

1920 film

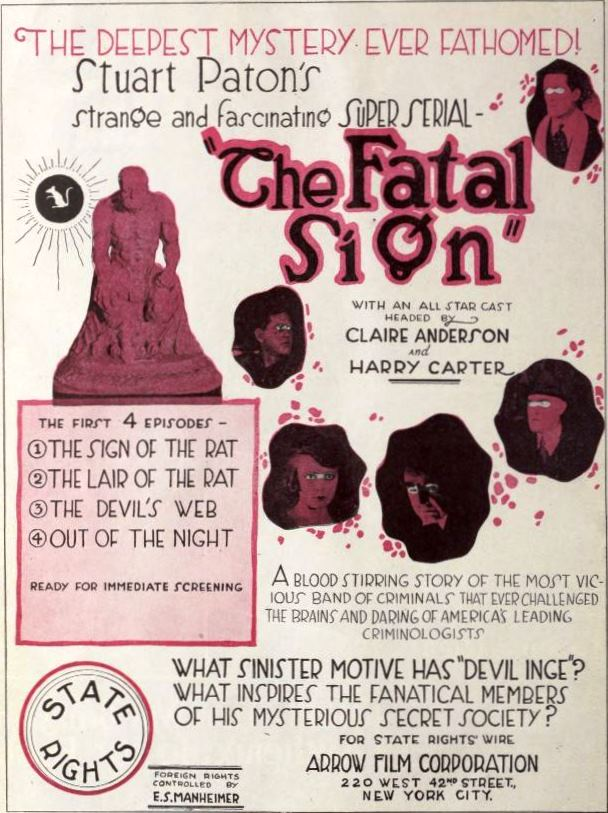
- Advertisement
- Directed by: Stuart Paton
- Written by: Bertram Millhauser
- Starring: Claire Anderson; Harry Carter
- Distributed by: Arrow Film Corporation
- Release date: February 1920
- Running time: 15 episodes
- Country: United States
- Language: Silent (English intertitles)

The Fatal Sign is a 1920 American crime film serial directed by Stuart Paton. It is considered to be a lost film.

== Cast ==
- Claire Anderson as Genevieve
- Harry Carter as Indigo
- Leo D. Maloney as Jerry
- Boyd Irwin as Sydney
- Joseph W. Girard
- Frank Tokunaga
- Fontaine La Rue
- Jack Richardson

== See also ==
- List of American films of 1920
- List of film serials
- List of film serials by studio
- List of lost films
