= The Social Buccaneer (1916 film) =

1916 film directed by Jack Conway

- Directed by: Jack Conway
- Written by: Frederic S. Isham (novel); Fred Myton
- Starring: J. Warren Kerrigan; Louise Lovely; Maude George
- Cinematography: Edward A. Kull
- Production company: Universal Pictures
- Distributed by: Universal Pictures
- Release date: October 16, 1916
- Running time: 50 minutes
- Country: United States
- Languages: Silent; English intertitles

The Social Buccaneer is a 1916 American silent drama film directed by Jack Conway and starring J. Warren Kerrigan, Louise Lovely and Maude George.

== Cast ==
- J. Warren Kerrigan as Chattfield Bruce
- Louise Lovely as Marjorie Woods
- Maude George as Miss Goldberg
- Harry Carter as Caglioni
- Marc B. Robbins as Nathan Goldberg
- Hayward Mack as Sir Archibald Bamford

== Preservation ==
- Prints and/or fragments were found in the Dawson Film Find in 1978.

== Bibliography ==
- Goble, Alan. The Complete Index to Literary Sources in Film. Walter de Gruyter, 1999.
