= Harry Carter (actor) =

American actor

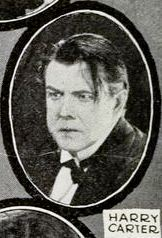
- Detail of advertisement for The Kentucky Derby (1922)
- Born: Harry Benjamin Carter; September 14, 1879; Louisville, Kentucky, US
- Died: July 22, 1952 (aged 72); Los Angeles, California, US
- Years active: 1914–1933

Harry Carter (September 14, 1879 – July 22, 1952) was an American actor of the silent era. He appeared in 84 films between 1914 and 1933. He was born in Louisville, Kentucky, and died in Los Angeles, California.

== Selected filmography ==
- The Master Key (1914)
- The Ruby Circle (1914)
- Judge Not; or The Woman of Mona Diggings (1915)
- Langdon's Legacy (1916)
- The Right to Be Happy (1916)
- The Beckoning Trail (1916)
- The Social Buccaneer (1916)
- The Silent Battle (1916)
- Secret Love (1916)
- The Measure of a Man (1916)
- The Bugler of Algiers (1916)
- Even As You and I (1917)
- The Gray Ghost (1917)
- The Circus of Life (1917)
- The Lure of the Circus (1918)
- Kiss or Kill (1918)
- Three Mounted Men (1918)
- The Marriage Lie (1918)
- After His Own Heart (1919)
- Proxy Husband (1919)
- The Fatal Sign (1920)
- Go Straight (1921)
- The Hope Diamond Mystery (1921)
- The Torrent (1921)
- Reputation (1921)
- Jackie (1921)
- Sure Fire (1921)
- Wolf Law (1922)
- A Dangerous Game (1922)
- Another Man's Shoes (1922)
- Top o' the Morning (1922)
- The Steel Trail (1923)
- Burning Words (1923)
- Dead Game (1923)
- Bavu (1923)
- The Fast Express (1924)
- Trails of Adventure (1933)
