= Leo Pierson =

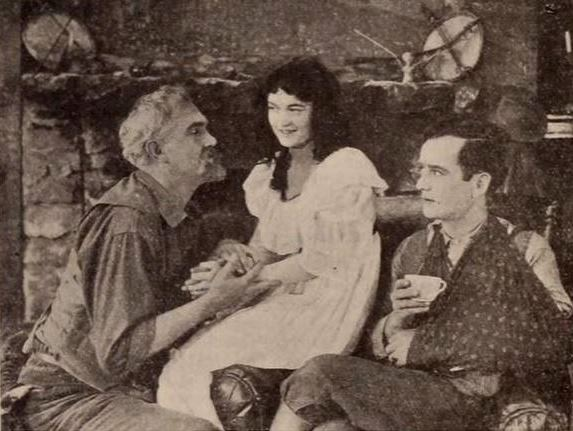
- Pierson in 1917 film '49–'17
- Born: Leo Olof Pierson; December 25, 1888; Abilene, Kansas, USA
- Died: October 2, 1943; Los Angeles, California, USA
- Education: St. Vincent's College for Boys
- Occupation: Actor
- Spouse: Ruth Ann Baldwin (m. 1917)

Leo Pierson (1888-1943) was an American film actor who was active during Hollywood's silent era. He was married to director and screenwriter Ruth Ann Baldwin.

== Biography ==
Leo was born in Abilene, Kansas, to Charles Pierson and his wife, Maude; Charles was an immigrant from Sweden. Later on, he moved to Los Angeles and attended St. Vincent's College, where he began appearing in stage plays and graduated in 1907.

His first known film role was in the 1911 short The Profligate. He acted in dozens of films from 1911 through 1919, the year he appears to have changed gears and focused on his work as a production manager.

He married screenwriter and director Ruth Ann Baldwin on February 19, 1917, the same year he appeared in her Universal films A Wife on Trial and '49-'17.

== Select filmography ==
1911

- The Profligate (1911)

1916

- The Crisis (1916)
- At Piney Ridge (1916)

1917

- '49-'17 (1917)
- A Wife on Trial (1917)
- Treason (1917)
- The Birth of Patriotism (1917)

1918

- The Cove of Missing Men (1918)
- The Girl of My Dreams (1918)
- Desert Law (1918)
- High Tide (1918)
- The Spreading Evil (1918)

1919

- Wagon Tracks (1919)
- The Solitary Sin (1919)
- The Poppy Girl's Husband (1919)
