= Love's Prisoner =

1919 film by John Francis Dillon

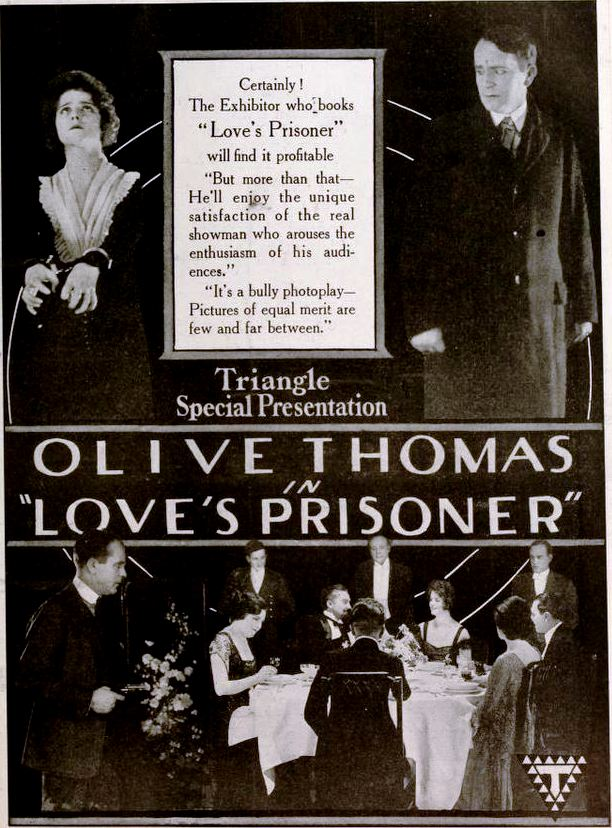
- Advertisement
- Directed by: John Francis Dillion
- Written by: E. Magnus Ingleton
- Starring: Olive Thomas; Joe King
- Cinematography: Stephen S. Norton
- Distributed by: Triangle Distributing Corporation
- Release date: June 8, 1919
- Running time: 47 minutes
- Country: United States
- Language: Silent (English intertitles)

Love's Prisoner is a 1919 American silent crime drama film starring Olive Thomas. Written by E. Magnus Ingleton, the film was directed by John Francis Dillion.

== Plot ==
A poor girl named Nancy leaves to take care of her two younger sisters, Sadie and Jane, while their father, who is a former criminal, is sent to prison for a crime he did not commit and dies there. At that time Jonathan Twist, a quaint philosopher and their somewhat mysterious neighbor who operates a watch repair shop and part-time fence, offers them help, and Nancy finds with his help a job as a seller of Cocoa Climax. Nancy marries a British businessman and peer Lord Cleveland, and she becomes Lady Cleveland. However, Lord Cleveland dies very soon without a will. Nancy does not have enough income to keep up the estates of Lord Cleveland in England, which pass to his other relatives, but receives the palatial home in America. She manages to keep this home and its servants without any visible means of support, and during this time the activities of a crook called by the police "The Bird" are mystifying the authorities. On the night of a reception at her house, there is a large diamond theft, and Jim Garside is detailed to catch The Bird. Jim discovers that Nancy is The Bird and Jonathan is her fence for the jewels she has taken, where much of the moneys have gone to the poor. Jim maintains her works for charity while she serves out her prison term, and in the end they are married.

== Cast ==
- Olive Thomas as Nancy
- Joe King as Jim Garside
- Ann Forrest as Sadie (billed as Ann Kroman)
- Dolly Dare as Jane
- Walter Perry as Nancy's father
- William V. Mong as Jonathan Twist
- Harvey Clark as Lord Cleveland
- Louis Durham as Shorty Dogan
