= '49–'17 =

1917 film

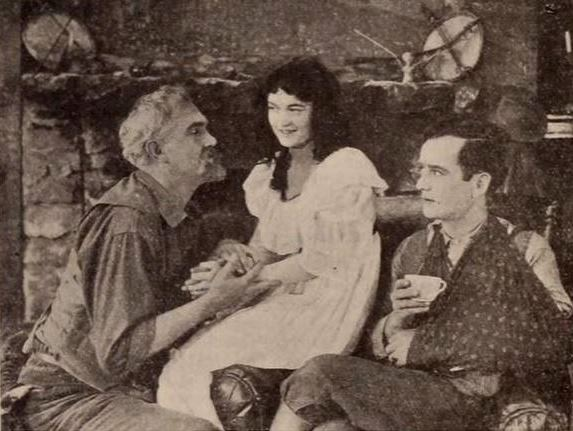
- (left to right: J. Girard, D. Drew, L. Pierson)
- Directed by: Ruth Ann Baldwin
- Written by: William Wallace Cook (story); Ruth Ann Baldwin
- Starring: Joseph W. Girard; Leo Pierson; William J. Dyer
- Cinematography: Stephen S. Norton
- Production company: Universal Pictures
- Distributed by: Universal Pictures
- Release date: October 15, 1917
- Running time: 62 minutes
- Country: United States
- Languages: Silent; English intertitles

'49–'17 is a 1917 American silent Western film directed by Ruth Ann Baldwin and starring Joseph W. Girard, Leo Pierson and William J. Dyer.

Baldwin began work on writing and directing a silent film called '49–'17, in 1917. It was the first Western directed by a woman. The film was five reels, and according to The New York Clipper, it was "being produced on a more elaborate scale than any play she has yet handled". Based on the short story "The Old West Per Contract", it starred Joseph Girard and Leo Pierson.

Full film

A complete print of this film is held by the Library of Congress.

== Plot ==
The film opens on Judge Brand and his secretary, Tom Reeves, lounging in their office as the Judge reminisces about his life in the Old West. Brand tells Tom about how he and his partner, Adams, participated in the Gold Rush. Brand and Adams had both fallen in love with a woman, though Adams had eventually won her affection and the two were married and had a child. This state of affairs did not last long however, as Adams' wife eventually left him for another man, taking the child with her. Not long after, Brand and Adams struck it rich, however Adams' wife never came back. Brand concludes the story by asking Tom to go out west to repopulate and rebuild the town Brand and Adams had lived in, Nugget Notch. Both so that Brand can relive some of his earlier days, and to potentially find Adams' child, and the heir to his fortune.

Tom does not initially find success in his search for potential occupants of Nugget Notch, but eventually hears about a struggling exposition troupe themed around the Old West, run by a man named J. Gordon Castle. Among this troupe is an innocent woman called Peggy Babbot, along with her parents Pa and Ma Babbot. However, Peggy is constantly watched by a mysterious Mr. Jim Rayner. Tom proposes Judge Brand's idea to Mr. Castle, who agrees. On the way to Nugget Notch, Rayner threatens Pa Bobbet not to let Tom near Peggy, Pa begrudgingly obliges. Tom also writes to Judge Brand that he has assembled a population to live in Nugget Notch, but tells Brand that Rayner seems untrustworthy.

Upon arrival at Nugget Notch, the troupe begins renovating the town and preparing for Judge Brand's arrival. When the Judge finally arrives, he remarks that the townsfolk are not quite as rough and hardy as the authentic 49ers used to be, but he seems to settle in well. It is then that Raynor learns that the Judge came west partially to find the heir to Adams' fortune, which Rayner takes an interest in. That night, at a banquet held to celebrate Judge Brand's arrival, Brand recognizes a necklace Peggy is wearing and it is revealed that Peggy is in fact Adams' daughter and heiress, with her real name being Lorena Adams. After the banquet, Peggy/Lorena informs Tom and the Judge that Raynor is threatening to have Pa Bobbet killed unless he can give Raynor $1,000 by the next day. Tom decides to confront Raynor and tells him not to harm Peggy.

Late in the night, Tom is kidnapped and blindfolded by Raynor, who lowers him via rope into a rock formation outside of town. The Judge notices that Tom is gone, and along with a man from the village go to find Tom. However, this was unnecessary as Tom was led out of the rocks by a friendly wolf. They then realize that there is, in fact, still gold in the rock formation. So the men set up a claim. The next day, as Tom and the Judge are talking, some of the townsfolk inform the two that Rayner has stolen all of the money, guns, and horses from the town during the night. It is then that Raynor himself appears and demands that the men hand over their pocket money at gunpoint. Raynor then kidnaps Peggy and makes a run for it. However, Judge Brand remembers a shortcut which allows him and Tom to ambush and capture Raynor using a rope.

The town decides to put Rayner on trial. During the proceedings it is revealed that Raynor was the man Adams' wife left Adams for, that Raynor had once been Pa Bobbet's partner and had used the death of a man Raynor had tried to steal from as blackmail against Bobbet for many years, and that Peggy was Pa Bobbet's real daughter all along. However, while all this is going on Rayner manages to undo his bindings, shoot Tom in the arm, and escape once again. But, at the last second, he falls off of his horse and is recaptured. The film ends with Judge Brand, Tom, and Peggy sitting together happily.

== Cast ==
- Joseph W. Girard as Judge Brand
- Leo Pierson as Tom Reeves aka Tom Robbins
- William J. Dyer as J. Gordon Castle
- Mattie Witting as Ma Bobbett
- George C. Pearce as Ezra Pa Bobbett
- Jean Hersholt as 'Gentleman Jim' Raynor
- Donna Drew as Peggy Bobbett aka Lorena Adams
- ZaSu Pitts as Party Guest
- Phyllis Haver as Young Bee Adam
- Harry L. Rattenberry as Col. Hungerford

== Reception ==
A reviewer for Exhibitor Herald in 1917 described the film as "boresome", and wrote that "'49–'17 is one of those productions which makes one move from one side of the seat to the other, open and close, and then finally drop off to sleep without the slightest effort".

A more current review of '49–'17 by Cullen Gallagher was positive toward the film, saying "Beyond its irrefutable historical significance, '49–'17 stands out for its clever reworking of traditional Western mythology at a time when the cinematic genre was still in its infancy".

== Preservation ==
A complete print of '49–'17 is held by the Library of Congress. The film also received a DVD/Blu-Ray and streaming release in 2018 by Kino Lorber.
