= Ann Forrest =

Danish-American actress (1895–1985)

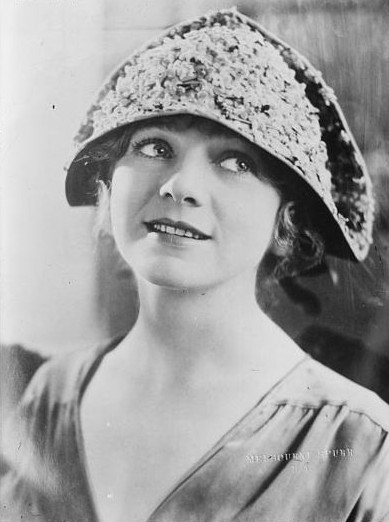
- Ann Forrest
- Born: Anna Kromann; 14 April 1895; Sønderho, Denmark
- Died: 25 October 1985 (aged 90); San Diego, California, U.S.
- Other names: Anne Kornan; Ann Kornan; Ann Kromarm
- Occupation: Actress
- Years active: 1915–1931
- Spouse: F. Steel Bain

Ann Forrest (née Kromann or Kroman; 14 April 1895 – 25 October 1985) was a Danish-born American actress of Hollywood's silent films.

== Biography ==
Forrest was born 14 April 1895 in Sønderho, Denmark and died 25 October 1985 in San Diego, California. William Farnum changed her name because he felt that her birth name was too harsh for her personality.

Between 1915 and 1925, she appeared in 33 movies. According to Ruth Wing, author of the Blue Book of the Screen, Forrest enjoyed playing homely character roles, and her characters often wept during the film. However, wanting to capitalize on her beauty, producers later cast her in society dramas.

Wing wrote "Ann Forrest is 'different'. She is different from most screen stars in personality and beauty. But the greatest difference lies in her achievement of cinema fame. Ann wept her way to stardom."

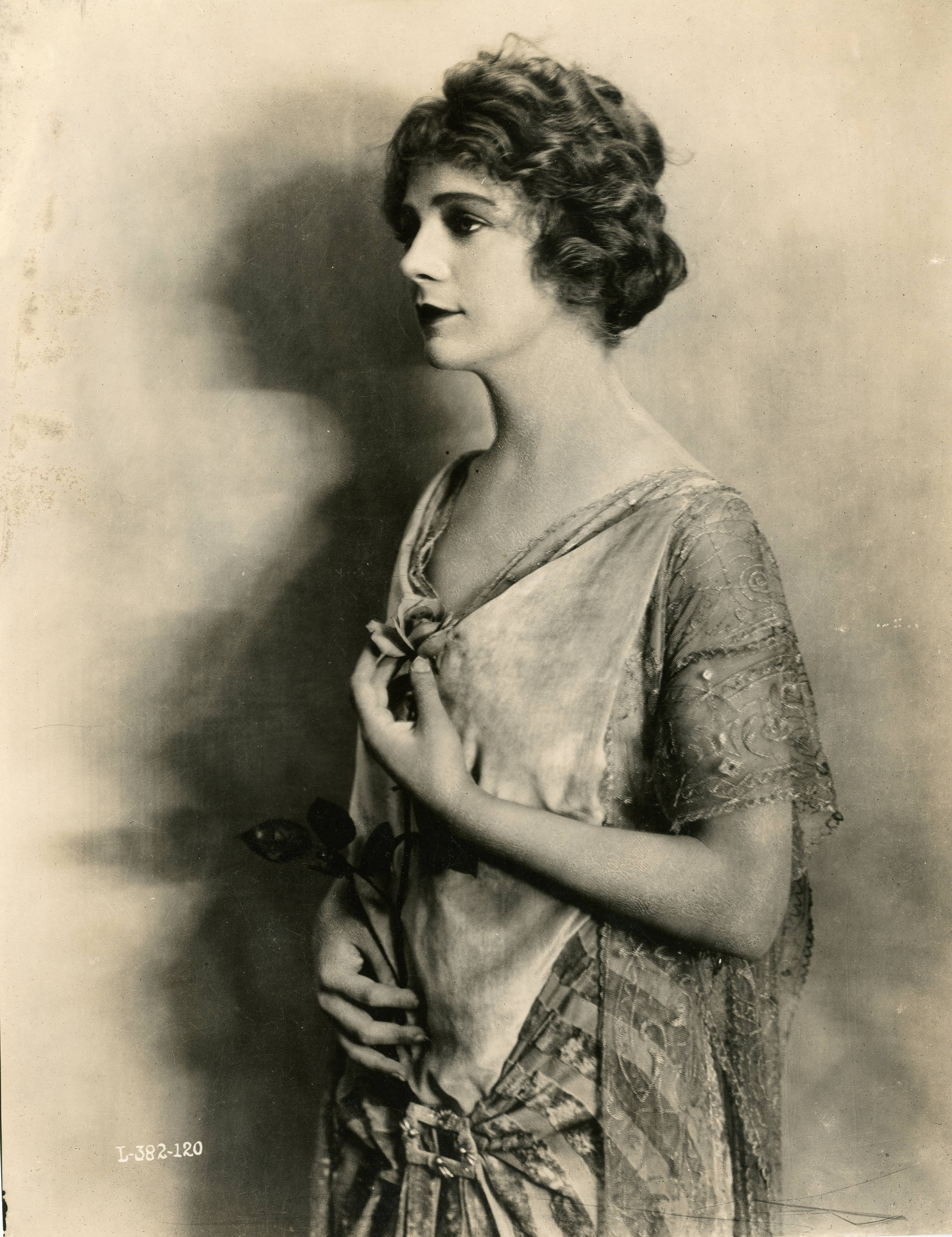
Forrest in The Great Impersonation (1921)

== Filmography ==
Year	Title	Role	Notes
1917	The Birth of Patriotism	Mary	Lost film
1917	The Flame of Youth	Lucy Andrews	Lost film
1917	The Midnight Man	Irene Hardin	Lost film
1917	The Tar Heel Warrior	Betty Malroy	Lost film
1917	The Medicine Man	Edith Strang	Lost film
1918	The Shoes That Danced	Mamie Conlon	Lost film
1918	An Honest Man	Ruby Cushing	Lost film
1918	Her Decision	Inah Dunbar	Lost film
1918	Marked Cards	Winona Harrington	Lost film
1918	The Rainbow Trail	Fay Larkin	Lost film
1919	Love's Prisoner	Sadie, Nancy's sister	Incomplete film
1919	The Grim Game	Mary Wentworth	
1919	The Midnight Man		Lost film
1920	Dangerous Days	Anna Klein	
1920	The Great Accident	Hetty Morfee	Lost film
1920	The Prince Chap	Phoebe Puckers	Lost film
1920	A Splendid Hazard	Laura Killigrew	Lost film
1920	Behold My Wife!	Marion Armour	Lost film
1921	The Faith Healer	Rhoda Williams	Lost film
1921	A Wise Fool	Zoe Barbille	
1921	The Great Impersonation	Rosamond Dominey	Lost film
1922	Love's Boomerang	Perpetua	Lost film
1922	The Man Who Played God	Marjory Blaine	
1923	If Winter Comes	Nona, Lady Tybar	Lost film
1923	Marriage Morals	Mary Gardner	Lost film
1925	Ridin' Pretty	Maize	(final film role)
