= The Snowbird =

1916 film by Edwin Carewe

- Directed by: Edwin Carewe
- Written by: Mary Rider (scenario)
- Produced by: B. A. Rolfe
- Starring: Mabel Taliaferro; Edwin Carewe; James Cruze
- Distributed by: Metro Pictures
- Release date: May 1, 1916
- Running time: 6 reels
- Country: United States
- Languages: Silent film, English intertitles

The Snowbird is a 1916 silent film drama directed by Edwin Carewe and starring Mabel Taliaferro. B. A. Rolfe produced while Metro Pictures distributed.

== Plot ==
The length of the movie is 82 minutes. Its plot, credited to Mary Ryder and June Mathis, concerns a tough society girl’s trip to rural Quebec, where she tangles with the ornery cuss defrauding her father.

== Cast ==
- Mabel Taliaferro as Lois Wheeler
- Edwin Carewe as Jean Corteau
- James Cruze as Bruce Mitchell
- Warren Cook as John Wheeler
- Arthur Evers as Pierre
- Walter Hitchcock as Michael Flynn
- Kitty Stevens as Zoe
- John Melody as Magistrate Le Blanc

== Preservation ==
A complete print of The Snowbird is located at the George Eastman Museum.
