= Pawn Ticket 210 =

1922 film by Scott R. Dunlap

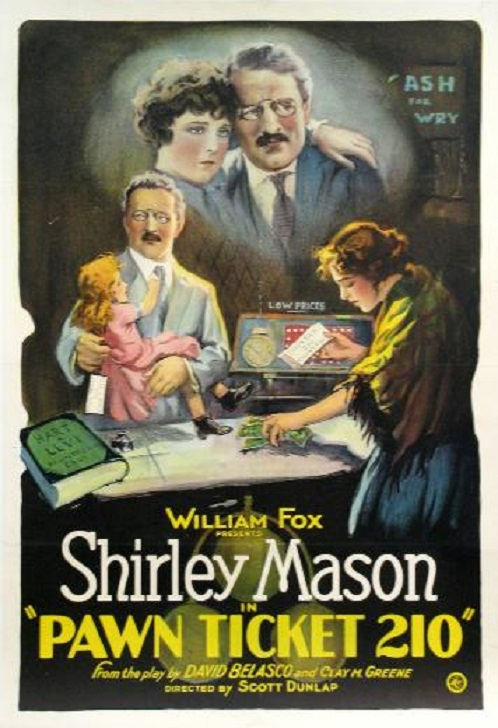
- Poster
- Directed by: Scott R. Dunlap
- Written by: Jules Furthman
- Based on: Unpublished play by David Belasco and Clay M. Greene
- Starring: Shirley Mason; Robert Agnew; Irene Hunt
- Cinematography: George Schneiderman
- Production company: Fox Film
- Distributed by: Fox Film
- Release date: December 24, 1922
- Running time: 5 reels
- Country: United States
- Language: Silent (English intertitles)

Pawn Ticket 210 is a 1922 American silent drama film directed by Scott R. Dunlap and starring Shirley Mason, Robert Agnew, and Irene Hunt.

== Plot ==
As described in a film magazine, On the day that Mrs. Levi (Manners) leaves her husband Harris (Warren), another woman comes into his pawn shop and tries to purchase a handgun. While she is in there, a policeman brings in a baby girl whom he says the woman left in the street. Harris gives the woman, Ruth Sternhold (Hunt), a pawn ticket for the child and promises to care for her. Years later, when the child has become the young woman Meg (Mason), Harris discovers that she is falling in love with Chick Saxe (Agnew), one of the young fellows of the neighborhood who has a rather shady reputation. Harris wants to give Meg every opportunity, so he arranges for a friend, supposedly a wealthy bachelor, to let her live at his home. Meg goes to her new surroundings and one day by chance meets her old sweetheart Chick, who swears that he has reformed. Ruth appears at the pawn shop with her ticket and wants to reclaim her child. Harris takes her to the house Meg is staying at and discovers that not only is his friend the husband of Ruth, but he is also the man who robbed Harris of his wife. Meg is able to bring about a reconciliation between the man who raised her and her real father.

== Cast ==
- Shirley Mason as Meg
- Robert Agnew as Chick Saxe
- Irene Hunt as Ruth Sternhold
- Jacob Abrams as Abe Levi
- Dorothy Manners as Mrs. Levi
- Fred Warren as Harris Levi
- Muriel McCormac

== Preservation ==
Pawn Ticket 210 is a lost film.

== Bibliography ==
- Solomon, Aubrey. The Fox Film Corporation, 1915-1935: A History and Filmography. McFarland, 2011.
