= Ridin' Pretty =

1925 film

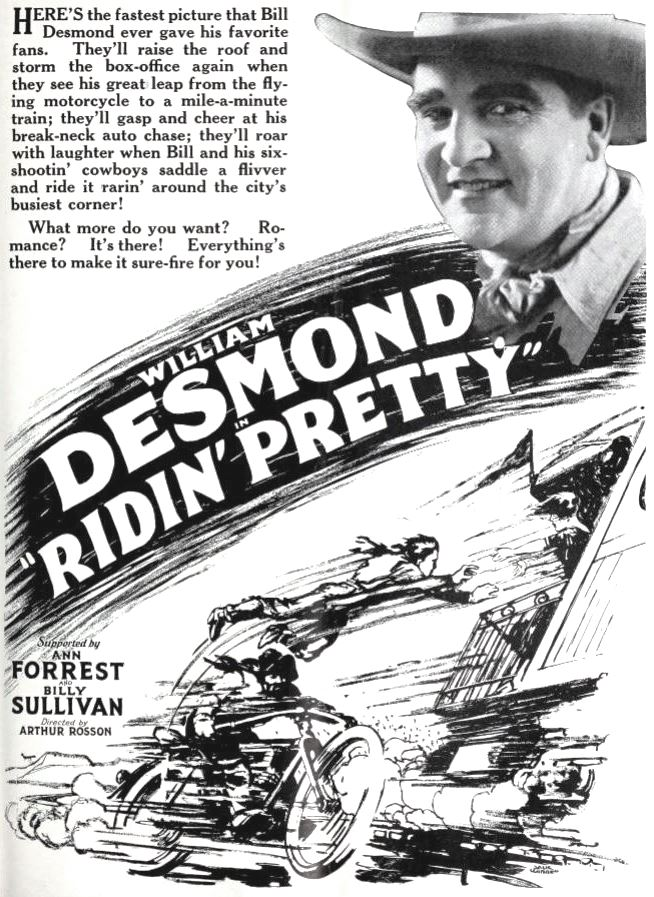
- Trade advertisement
- Directed by: Arthur Rosson
- Written by: Isadore Bernstein; George Hively; Raymond L. Schrock
- Starring: William Desmond; Ann Forrest; Stanhope Wheatcroft
- Cinematography: Jackson Rose
- Production company: Universal Pictures
- Distributed by: Universal Pictures
- Release date: February 22, 1925
- Running time: 5 reels
- Country: United States
- Languages: Silent; English intertitles

Ridin' Pretty is a 1925 American silent Western film directed by Arthur Rosson and starring William Desmond, Ann Forrest, and Stanhope Wheatcroft.

== Plot ==
As described in a review in a film magazine, Arizona cowboy Sky Parker goes to San Francisco to claim an inheritance left him by his uncle. He takes five cowboys with him. The "boys" have a hectic time, among the adventures include a ride through the city on borrowed truck horses from a brewery, a stunt for which they are arrested. A cousin of Sky persuades Maize, a young woman, to assist him in getting the inheritance away from Sky, but she relents and runs away. Sky rides a motorcycle to catch and board her train, winds her consent to marriage, and throws out his cousin.

== Cast ==
- William Desmond as Sky Parker
- Ann Forrest as Maize
- Stanhope Wheatcroft as Miller
- Billy Sullivan as Stringbean
- Slim Cole as Big Bill
- Tex Young as Shorty
- William Gillis as Gloom
- Frank Rice as Barb Wire

== Censorship ==
Before the film could be exhibited in Kansas, the Kansas Board of Review required the elimination of a girl dancing in reel 2, "where wriggling is so noticeable," and removal of scene in reel 5 where women have fallen asleep on man's shoulders.

== Preservation ==
A print of Ridin' Pretty is in the collection of EYE Film Institute Netherlands.

== Bibliography ==
- Munden, Kenneth White. The American Film Institute Catalog of Motion Pictures Produced in the United States, Part 1. University of California Press, 1997.
