= The Flame of Youth =

- Directed by: Elmer Clifton
- Written by: Karl R. Coolidge; F. McGrew Willis; Walter Woods
- Starring: Jack Mulhall; Ann Forrest; Hayward Mack
- Production company: Universal Pictures
- Distributed by: Universal Pictures
- Release date: June 16, 1917
- Running time: 50 minutes
- Country: United States
- Languages: Silent; English intertitles

The Flame of Youth is a 1917 American silent adventure film directed by Elmer Clifton and starring Jack Mulhall, Ann Forrest and Hayward Mack.

== Cast ==
- Jack Mulhall as Jimmy Gordon
- Ann Forrest as Lucy Andrews
- Donna Drew as Nadine
- Hayward Mack as Sir Beverly Wyndham
- Alfred Allen as Jasper Sneedham
- Ed Brady as McCool
- Fred Montague as James Gordon Sr.
- Burton Law as Beppo
- Percy Challenger as Fred Haimer
- Harry Mann as Bennie Zussbaum
- Harry Morris as Juan

== Bibliography ==
- Hans J. Wollstein. Strangers in Hollywood: the history of Scandinavian actors in American films from 1910 to World War II. Scarecrow Press, 1994.
