= Marriage Morals =

1923 silent film

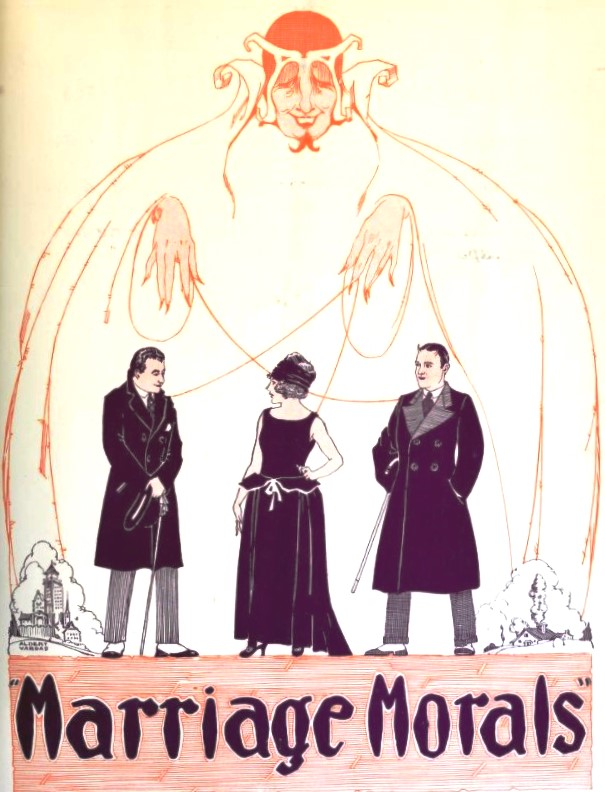
- Directed by: William Nigh
- Written by: William Nigh
- Produced by: Robert North
- Starring: Tom Moore; Ann Forrest; Harry T. Morey
- Cinematography: John W. Brown; Sidney Hickox
- Production companies: Weber & North Productions
- Release date: August 15, 1923
- Running time: 70 minutes
- Country: United States
- Languages: Silent; English intertitles

Marriage Morals is a 1923 American silent romantic drama film directed by William Nigh and starring Tom Moore, Ann Forrest and Harry T. Morey.

== Cast ==
- Tom Moore as Young Harry Ryan
- Ann Forrest as Mary Gardner
- Russell Griffin as Harry Jr
- John Goldsworthy as J.C. Black
- Harry T. Morey as Marvin
- Edmund Breese as Harry's Father
- Florence Billings as Molly Mahoney
- Ben Hendricks Jr. as John Brink
- Shannon Day as His Wife
- Mickey Bennett as Mary's Brother
- Charles Craig as Harry's Pal
- Tom Lewis as Harry's Pal

== Bibliography ==
- Munden, Kenneth White. The American Film Institute Catalog of Motion Pictures Produced in the United States, Part 1. University of California Press, 1997.
