= Behind the Lines (1916 film) =

1916 film

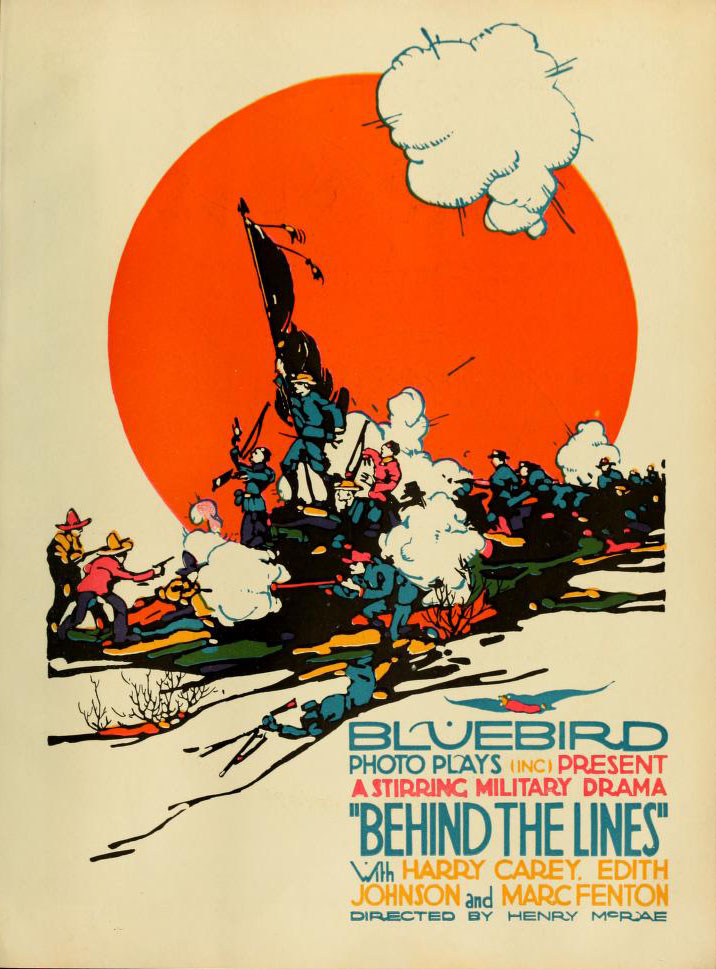
- Film poster
- Directed by: Henry MacRae
- Written by: Mary Rider; Walter Woods
- Starring: Harry Carey
- Cinematography: Harry A. Gant
- Production company: Bluebird Photoplays
- Distributed by: Bluebird Photoplays
- Release date: September 18, 1916
- Running time: 5 reels
- Country: United States
- Language: Silent with English intertitles

Behind the Lines is a 1916 American silent drama film featuring Harry Carey. Behind the Lines was produced by Bluebird Photoplays, one of the three brands of motion pictures then being released by Universal Film Manufacturing Company.

== Cast ==
- Edith Johnson as Nina Garcia
- Harry Carey as Dr. Ralph Hamlin
- Ruth Clifford as Camilla
- Mark Fenton as Señor Garcia (as Marc Fenton)
- Miriam Shelby as Señnora Cano
- William Human as Carlos (as Bill Human)
- Lee Shumway as Jose (as L.C. Shumway)
- Edwin Wallock as General Dominguez (as E.N. Wallack)
- L. M. Wells as General Nomonza
- Ray Hanford as Torrenti
- Lee Hill as Fred Williams
- Ernest Shields as Bit Role (uncredited)

== See also ==
- List of American films of 1916
