= Allen Holubar =

American actor and director (1890–1923)

Allen J. Holubar
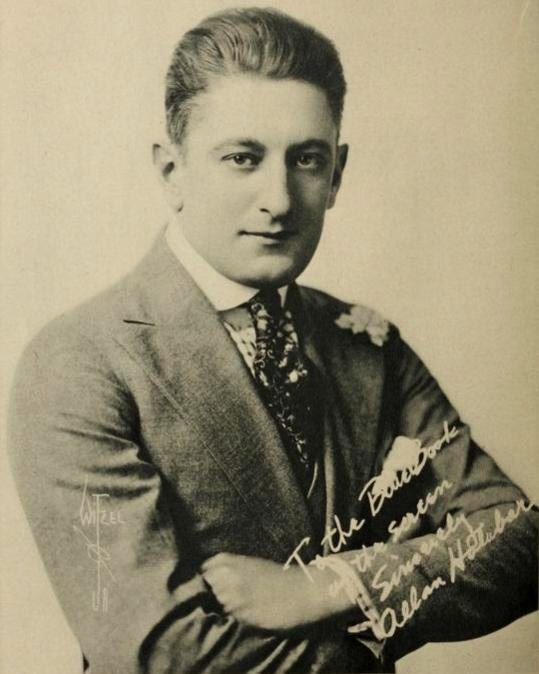
- Holubar in 1923
- Born: August 3, 1890; San Francisco, California, US
- Died: November 20, 1923 (aged 33); Los Angeles, California, US
- Occupations: Actor, film director, screenwriter
- Years active: 1913-1923
- Spouse: Dorothy Phillips (m.1912)

Allen J. Holubar (August 3, 1890 – November 20, 1923) was an American actor, film director, and screenwriter of the silent film era. He appeared in 38 films between 1913 and 1917. He also directed 33 films between 1916 and 1923.

== Career ==
Allen Holubar started out as an actor on the stage where he met his wife Dorothy Phillips in the Chicago production of Every Woman. While she turned to the screen and continued to act he became a director and even produced. Encouraged by these successes, together they formed the Allen Holubar Production Company in 1920. His 1918 film The Heart of Humanity was exhibited at The Museum of Modern Art in 2014.

== Marriage and death ==
Holubar was married to actress Dorothy Phillips for eleven years from 1912 until his death in 1923 from pneumonia, following surgery, at the age of 33. Dorothy herself would die of pneumonia in 1980, at age 90.

== Selected filmography ==
- Into the North (1913)
- Courtmartialed (1915)
- The White Terror (1915)
- 20,000 Leagues Under the Sea (1916)
- Ashes of Remembrance (1916), wrote and produced, Universal Film Manufacturing
- Behind Life's Stage (1916), Universal Film Manufacturing
- The Taint of Fear (1916), wrote and directed, Universal Film Manufacturing
- The Field of Honor (1917)
- The Reed Case (1917)
- Heart Strings (1917)
- Treason (1917)
- The Talk of the Town (1918)
- The Heart of Humanity (1918–19)
- Broken Chains (1922)

Holubar wrote or contributed to the screenplay for the following films:

- Sirens of the Sea (1917)
- The Reed Case (1917)
- The Heart of Humanity (1918)
- The Mortgaged Wife (1918)
- The Talk of the Town (1918)
- Paid in Advance (1919)
- The Right to Happiness (1919)
- Once to Every Woman (1920)
- Man, Woman & Marriage (1921)
- Hurricane's Gal (1922)

Holubar directed the following films:

- The Prodigal Daughter
- Fear Not (1917)
- Sirens of the Sea (1917)
- The Field of Honor (1917)
- The Reed Case (1917)
- Treason (1917)
- A Soul for Sale (1918)
- The Heart of Humanity (1918)
- The Mortgaged Wife (1918)
- The Talk of the Town (1918)
- Paid in Advance (1919)
- The Right to Happiness (1919)
- Once to Every Woman (1920)
- Man-Woman-Marriage (1921)
- Broken Chains (1922)
- Hurricane's Gal (1922)
- Slander the Woman (1923)
