= Another Man's Wife (film) =

1924 film

- Directed by: Bruce Mitchell
- Written by: Elliott J. Clawson; Bruce Mitchell
- Starring: James Kirkwood; Lila Lee; Wallace Beery
- Cinematography: Stephen S. Norton
- Production company: Regal Pictures
- Distributed by: Producers Distributing Corporation
- Release date: September 7, 1924
- Running time: 50 minutes
- Country: United States
- Languages: Silent; English intertitles

Another Man's Wife is a 1924 American silent drama film directed by Bruce Mitchell and starring James Kirkwood, Lila Lee and Wallace Beery. The story takes part in a ship off Mazatlán in Mexico.

== Cast ==
- James Kirkwood as John Brand
- Lila Lee as Helen Brand
- Wallace Beery as Captain Wolf
- Matt Moore as Phillip Cochran
- Zena Keefe as Dancer
- Chester Conklin as Rumrunner
- Kate Price
- Ralph Yearsley
- Donald MacDonald

== Preservation ==
With no holdings located in archives, Another Man's Wife is considered a lost film.

== Bibliography ==
- Connelly, Robert B. The Silents: Silent Feature Films, 1910-36, Volume 40, Issue 2. December Press, 1998.
- Munden, Kenneth White. The American Film Institute Catalog of Motion Pictures Produced in the United States, Part 1. University of California Press, 1997.
