= Heart Strings (1917 film) =

1917 film

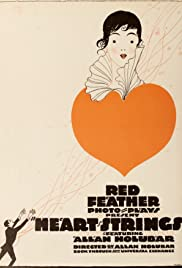
- Directed by: Allen Holubar
- Written by: E. Magnus Ingleton; Fred Myton
- Starring: Allen Holubar; Francelia Billington; Maude George
- Production company: Universal Pictures
- Distributed by: Universal Pictures
- Release date: January 22, 1917
- Running time: 50 minutes
- Country: United States
- Languages: Silent; English intertitles

Heart Strings is a 1917 American silent drama film directed by and starring Allen Holubar.

== Cast ==
- Allen Holubar as Dr. John McLean
- Francelia Billington as Johanna
- Paul Buron as Gerald
- Maude George as Leonie
- Virginia Lee Corbin as Johanna - as a child
- Charles Cummings as Hartley
- Irene Hunt as Sue
- Mattie Witting as Housekeeper
- Zoe Rae as Undetermined Role

== Bibliography ==
- Robert B. Connelly. The Silents: Silent Feature Films, 1910-36, Volume 40, Issue 2. December Press, 1998.
