= The Wife He Bought =

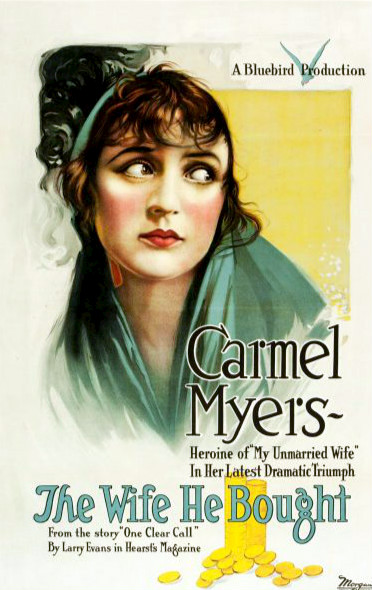
- Film poster
- Directed by: Harry Solter
- Written by: Harvey Gates
- Based on: "One Clear Call" by Larry Evans
- Produced by: Bluebird Photoplays
- Starring: Carmel Myers; Kenneth Harlan
- Cinematography: Roy H. Klaffki
- Distributed by: Bluebird Photoplays
- Release date: February 4, 1918
- Running time: 50 minutes
- Country: United States
- Language: Silent (English intertitles)

The Wife He Bought is a 1918 American silent drama film directed by Harry Solter and starring Carmel Myers and Kenneth Harlan. This film was based on the short story One Clear Call by Larry Evans. It was produced and released by Bluebird Photoplays, a division of Universal Film Manufacturing Company.

== Cast ==
- Carmel Myers as Janice Benson
- Kenneth Harlan as Steele Valiant
- Howard Crampton as Hutch Valiant
- Sydney Deane as James Brieson
- Allan Sears

== Preservation ==
The Wife He Bought is a lost film.
