= Ruth Ann Baldwin =

American film director

- Born: September 30, 1886; West Suffield, Connecticut, USA
- Died: Unknown
- Occupations: Screenwriter, director, journalist
- Spouse: Leo Pierson (m. 1917)

Ruth Ann Baldwin (September 30, 1886 – ) was an American journalist who became a silent film writer and director active during the 1910s, making her one of the first female directors in America. Unfortunately, as is common with many women filmmakers in the 20th century, there is little known about her aside from her 31 writing credits and 12 directing credits from 1913-1921. Most of Baldwin's films were destroyed in the 1924 fire at Universal Studios.

Baldwin is best known for her film, '49-'17; This film is notable for being one of the first Westerns directed by a woman, marking a significant milestone in early cinema.

== Early life ==
Ruth Ann Baldwin was born in September 1886 in West Suffield, Connecticut, to Charles Baldwin and Abby Taylor. Her father died when she was young, and she and her mother relocated to the San Diego, California, area. Ruth Ann attended school in National City, where her musical talents were evident, before forging a career as a journalist.

After working as a society columnist at The San Diego Sun, she appears to have moved to Los Angeles around 1913. She was engaged to be married to Walter Bullard Ridgeway, a landscape architect, that same year, although that marriage does not seem to have taken place.

Baldwin later married actor Leo Pierson, who appeared in many of the films she directed, including her two feature films, A Wife on Trial and '49–'17.

== Career ==
Ruth Ann Baldwin began her film career with the Bison Film Company, a subsidiary of Universal Film Manufacturing Company that specialized in Westerns. In 1913, Baldwin was hired as a writer. She wrote scenarios for a number of films produced over the next few years, beginning with The Werewolf (1913). Most of the films for which she received writing credit are shorts, but Baldwin also contributed to feature-length films.

In December 1914, Universal sent Baldwin to London to assist E. Phillips Oppenheim with turning his, The Black Box into a 15-episode serial. Phillips was an experienced novelist, but The Black Box was the first of his works to be adapted for film and Baldwin had gained a reputation for scenario expertise.

In August 1916, after working for Universal for several years as a writer and a six-month stint as a film editor, Baldwin became a director for Universal. Her first directorial effort was The Mother Call (1916), a one-reel drama.

In 1917, she directed a feature-length film called A Wife on Trial. Based on the novel The Rose Garden Husband, and starring her husband and Mignon Anderson, the film centers on a girl who dreams of owning a garden and ends up marrying a paralyzed man who owns one. Critic Robert C. McElravy of Moving Picture World opined, "... it gets over extremely well and will please the average audience immensely".

For unknown reasons, Baldwin left Universal Studios. Fox Film Company and Metro Pictures Corporation credited Baldwin with six scenarios from 1919-1921.

== Post-directing ==
'49–'17 is considered Baldwin's final directorial effort. Following '49–'17, Baldwin left Universal and returned to screenwriting. From 1919 until around 1921, Baldwin wrote scenarios and screenplays for many more films.

In June 1921, Baldwin joined the Clubhouse of the Screen Writers Guild, and was elected to the board of directors.

In 1925, the Los Angeles Times reported that “Ruth Ann Baldwin, a writer” was living in a stone cabin on a 320-acre “desert ranch." This is the last documented mention of Ruth Ann Baldwin. Her death date is still unknown.

== Filmography ==
| Year | Films | Credit | Notes |
|---|---|---|---|
| 1913 | The Werewolf | Screenwriter | Lost film Short |
| 1914 | A Prince of Bavaria | Screenwriter | Lost film Short |
| 1914 | The Vagabond | Screenwriter | Lost film Short |
| 1914 | Traffic in Babies | Screenwriter | Lost film Short |
| 1914 | Damon and Pythias | Screenwriter | |
| 1914 | The Heart of a Magdalene | Screenwriter | Short |
| 1914 | The Big Sister’s Christmas | Screenwriter | Lost film Short |
| 1915 | Pawns of Fate | Screenwriter | Lost film Short |
| 1915 | The Temptation of Edwin Swayne | Screenwriter | Short |
| 1915 | An Arrangement with Fate | Screenwriter | Lost film Short |
| 1915 | The Blank Page | Screenwriter | Lost film Short |
| 1915 | A Double Deal in Pork | Screenwriter | Lost film Short |
| 1916 | A Son of the Immortals | Screenwriter | Partly Extant |
| 1916 | A Recoiling Vengeance | Screenwriter | Lost film Short |
| 1916 | The Mother Call | Screenwriter | Lost film Short |
| 1916 | The End of the Rainbow | Assistant Director | |
| 1917 | The Rented Man | Director; Screenwriter | Lost film Short |
| 1917 | It Makes a Difference | Director; Screenwriter | Lost film Short |
| 1917 | Is Money All? | Director; Screenwriter | Lost film Short |
| 1917 | 'Twixt Love and Desires | Director; Screenwriter | Lost film Short |
| 1917 | The Black Mantilla | Director; Screenwriter | Lost film Short |
| 1917 | A Soldier of the Legion | Director; Screenwriter | Lost film Short |
| 1917 | The Woman Who Would Not Pay | Director; Screenwriter | Lost film Short |
| 1917 | The Storm Woman | Director; Screenwriter | Lost film Short |
| 1917 | When Liz Lets Loose | Director; Screenwriter | Lost film Short |
| 1917 | Three Women of France | Director | Lost film Short |
| 1917 | A Wife on Trial | Director | |
| 1917 | '49-'17 | Director; Screenwriter | |
| 1919 | The Sneak | Screenwriter | Lost film |
| 1919 | Cheating Herself | Screenwriter | Lost film |
| 1919 | Chasing Rainbows | Screenwriter | Lost film |
| 1919 | The Broken Commandments | Screenwriter | Lost film |
| 1920 | The Devil’s Riddle | Screenwriter | Lost film |
| 1921 | The Marriage of William Ashe | Screenwriter | Lost film |
| 1921 | Puppets of Fate | Screenwriter | Lost film |
