= Irene Hunt (actress) =

American actress

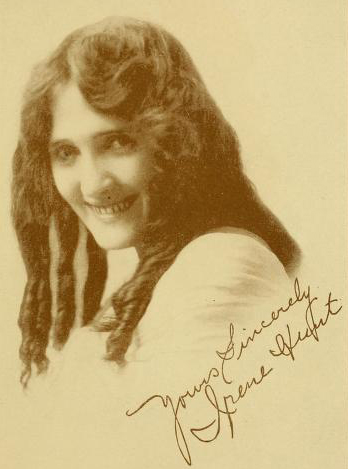
- Hunt in 1915
- Born: February 22, 1892; New York City, US
- Died: October 13, 1988 (aged 96); Paso Robles, California, US
- Occupation: Actress
- Years active: 1911–1926

Irene Hunt (February 22, 1892 – October 13, 1988) was an American film actress of the silent era. She appeared in 120 films between 1911 and 1926. She was born in New York, New York, and died in Paso Robles, California.

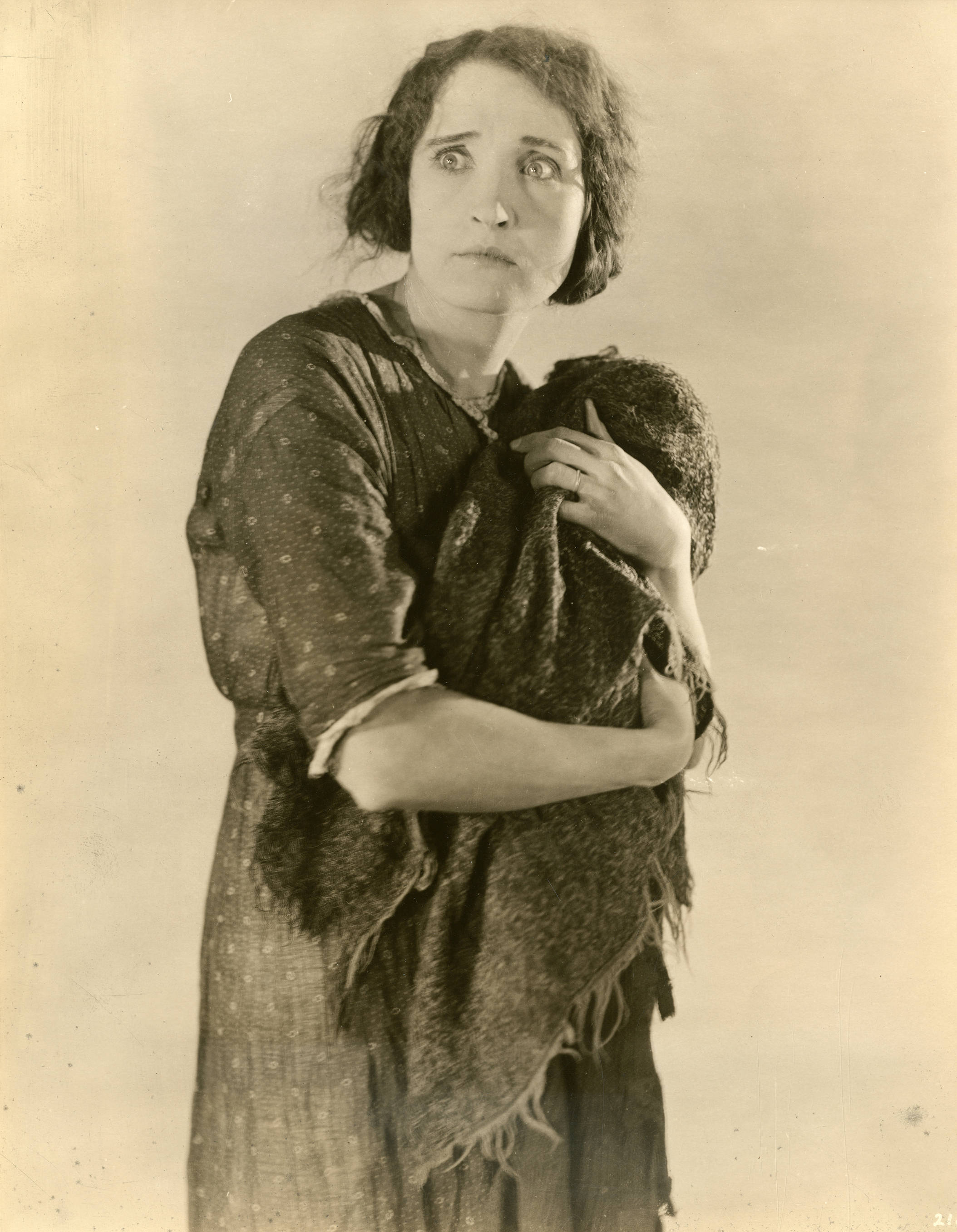
Irene Hunt, 1923

Although she performed primarily in dramatic films, she also acted in Westerns and action films.

== Partial filmography ==
- Almost a Rescue (1913)
- The Life of General Villa (1914)
- The Mountain Rat (1914)
- Added Fuel (1915)
- The Penitentes (1915)
- The Outlaw's Revenge (1915)
- Heart Strings (1917)
- The Stainless Barrier (1917)
- The Birth of Patriotism (1917)
- The Hand at the Window (1918)
- Cinderella's Twin (1920)
- Moon Madness (1920)
- The Big Punch (1921)
- Oliver Twist, Jr. (1921)
- The Last Card (1921)
- The Crimson Challenge (1922)
- Forget Me Not (1922)
- Pawn Ticket 210 (1922)
- Hearts Aflame (1923)
- The Eternal Three (1923)
- The Dramatic Life of Abraham Lincoln (1924) as Nancy Hanks Lincoln
- The Foolish Virgin (1924)
- The Phantom of the Forest (1926)
