= The Birth of Patriotism =

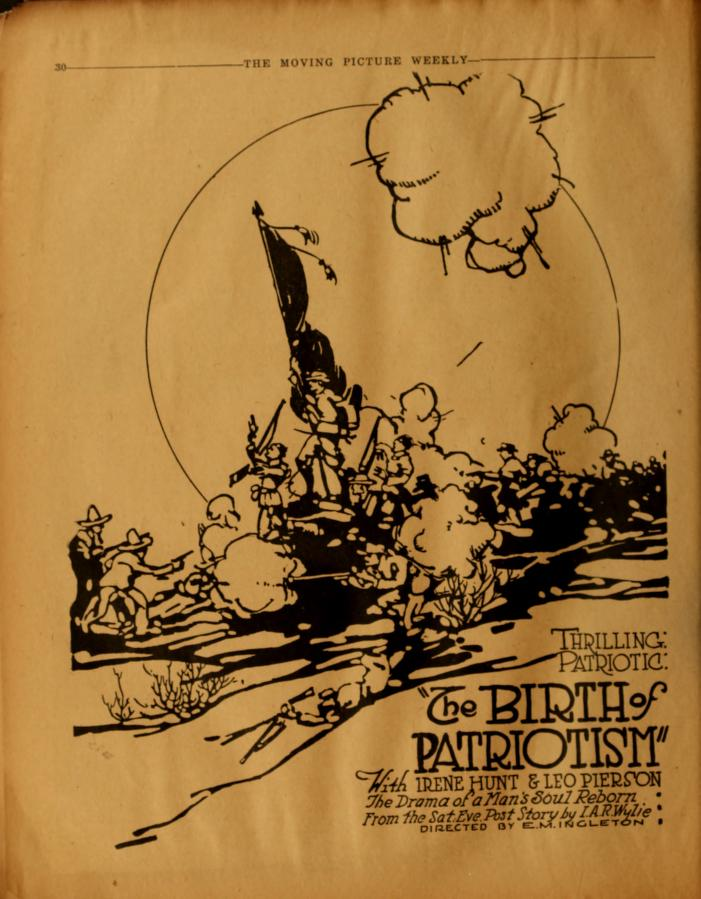
- Advertisement
- Directed by: E. Magnus Ingleton
- Written by: I.A.R. Wylie (story); E. Magnus Ingleton
- Starring: Irene Hunt; Ann Forrest; Leo Pierson
- Cinematography: Duke Hayward
- Production company: Universal Film Manufacturing Company
- Distributed by: Universal Film Manufacturing Company
- Release date: April 30, 1917
- Running time: 50 minutes
- Country: United States
- Language: Silent (English intertitles)

The Birth of Patriotism is a 1917 American silent war drama film directed by E. Magnus Ingleton and starring Irene Hunt, Ann Forrest, and Leo Pierson. Based on a story by I.A.R. Wylie, it is set in England during the First World War.

== Plot summary ==
Carelessness on the part of Johnny Roberts and the growing drudgery of married life causes an estrangement between Johnny and his wife Mary. The final break comes when Johnny, sick with a fever, returns home to be accused of drunkenness by Mary. Johnny leaves his wife to seek solace in Anne, the innkeeper's daughter, and the two live happily together until the outbreak of the war. When England is threatened, Johnny enlists and is sent to the front. In the meantime, Mary, with her little baby, seeks Anne out to ask for some of her husband's money to take care of the child. A mutual understanding springs up between the two women and upon Johnny's arrival home, the self-sacrificing Anne disappears and Johnny returns to his wife and child.

== Cast ==
- Irene Hunt as Anne
- Ann Forrest as Mary
- Leo Pierson as Johnny Roberts
- Ernest Shields as Sam Peters
- Frank Caffray as Ike
- Lydia Yeamans Titus as Sallie Hawkins
- J. Edwin Brown as Gus Hawkins

== Bibliography ==
- Leslie Midkiff DeBauche. Reel Patriotism: The Movies and World War I. Univ of Wisconsin Press, 1997.
