= The Field of Honor =

- Directed by: Allen Holubar
- Written by: Elliott J. Clawson; Brand Whitlock
- Starring: Allen Holubar; Frank MacQuarrie; Louise Lovely
- Cinematography: Roy H. Klaffki
- Production company: Universal Pictures
- Distributed by: Universal Pictures
- Release date: June 11, 1917
- Running time: 50 minutes
- Country: United States
- Languages: Silent; English intertitles

The Field of Honor is a 1917 American silent drama film directed by Allen Holubar and starring Holubar, Frank MacQuarrie and Louise Lovely.

== Cast ==
- Allen Holubar as Wade Clayton
- Frank MacQuarrie as Amos Tolliver
- Sydney Deane as Poole
- Louise Lovely as Laura Sheldon
- Helen Wright as Laura's Mother
- Millard K. Wilson as George Baring

== Preservation ==
A print is preserved in the Library of Congress collection.

== Bibliography ==
- Robert B. Connelly. The Silents: Silent Feature Films, 1910-36, Volume 40, Issue 2. December Press, 1998.
