= Polly Put the Kettle On (film) =

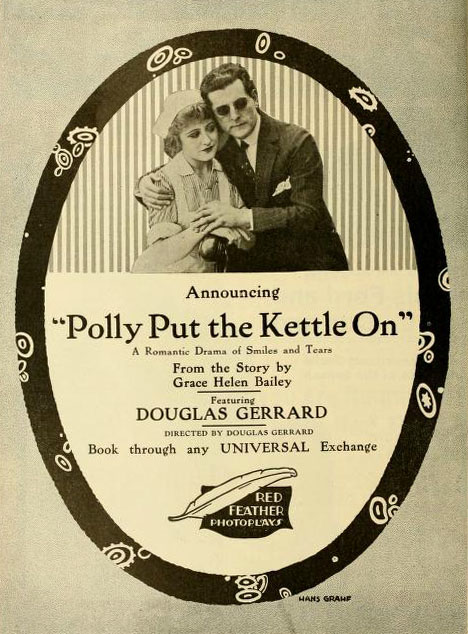
- Directed by: Douglas Gerrard
- Written by: Grace Helen Bailey; Elizabeth Chandler Hendrix
- Starring: Douglas Gerrard; Thomas Jefferson; Ruth Clifford
- Cinematography: Anton Nagy
- Production company: Universal Pictures
- Distributed by: Universal Pictures
- Release date: January 1, 1917
- Running time: 50 minutes
- Country: United States
- Languages: Silent; English intertitles

Polly Put the Kettle On is a 1917 American silent drama film directed by Douglas Gerrard and starring Gerrard, Thomas Jefferson and Ruth Clifford.

== Cast ==
- Douglas Gerrard as Chester Creigg
- Thomas Jefferson Mr. Vance
- Ruth Clifford as Polly Vance
- Martha Mattox as Miss Johanna Webb
- Marvel Spencer as Myra Vance
- Lina Basquette as Nellie Vance
- Zoe Rae as Susie Vance

== Bibliography ==
- Robert B. Connelly. The Silents: Silent Feature Films, 1910-36, Volume 40, Issue 2. December Press, 1998.
