= Grace Helen Bailey =

American songwriter

Grace Helen Bailey (August 9, 1876 – November 25, 1946) was a writer of stories and song lyrics in the United States. Several of her stories were adapted to film. In 1913 she wrote "Christmas at Ellis Island". She also wrote "The Jew, a tale of San Francisco", "Little Israel, a story of San Francisco", "Kingley's Ride", and "Davie", published in Overland magazine in 1905. She was also published in The Woman's Magazine.

She was part of a group of writers whose regional fiction was published.

== Filmography ==
- The New Partner (1914)
- Polly Put the Kettle On (film) (1917), inspired by the song
- Sirens of the Sea (film) (1917)
- The Honor of Men (1917)
- The War Waif (1917)
