= Treason (1917 film) =

1917 film

- Directed by: Allen Holubar
- Written by: Robert Lee Weigert (story & screenplay)
- Produced by: Bluebird Photoplays
- Starring: Allen Holubar; Lois Wilson; Dorothy Davenport
- Cinematography: Roy H. Klaffki
- Production company: Bluebird Photoplays
- Distributed by: Universal Pictures
- Release date: May 14, 1917
- Running time: 5 reels
- Country: United States
- Language: Silent..English titles

Treason is a lost 1917 silent film war-drama directed by and starring Allen Holubar and costarring Lois Wilson and Dorothy Davenport. It was produced by Bluebird Photoplays and distributed by them through Universal Film Manufacturing Company.

== Cast ==
- Allen Holubar - Pettrus Baariot
- Lois Wilson - Floria Natarre
- Dorothy Davenport - Luella Brysk
- Joseph W. Girard - Gergus Natarre
- George C. Pearce - Rodane Keestelt
- Edward Hearn - Danick Rysson
- Leo Pierson - Jossef Natarre
- Burton Law - Dyrkess Ledyard
- L. M. Wells - Seddrick Radore
