= The Werewolf (1913 film) =

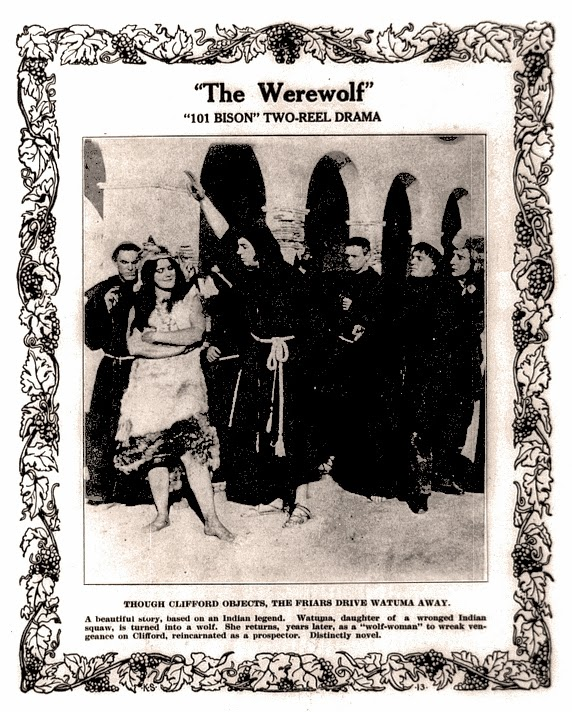
- Directed by: Henry MacRae
- Screenplay by: Ruth Ann Baldwin
- Starring: Phyllis Gordon; Clarence Burton; Marie Walcamp; Lule Warrenton; William Clifford
- Production company: 101 Bison
- Release date: 13 December 1913

The Werewolf is a 1913 silent film short directed by Henry MacRae. The film is about a Navajo woman becoming a timberwolf.

== Plot ==
Kee-On-Ee, a Navajo woman, becomes a witch after erroneously believing that her husband has abandoned her. She teaches the same skills to her daughter Watuma, who transforms into a wolf to carry out vengeance against the invading white settlers. Then, 100 years after Watuma's death, she returns from the dead to kill again. According to film historian Kelly Robinson, the film contains supernatural elements beyond mere lycanthropy, such as witchcraft and reincarnation.

== Production ==
Film historian Gary Don Rhodes stated that The Werewolf, written by Ruth Ann Baldwin drew upon folktale traditions as well as the popularity of "Indian" films in early cinema. Baldwin was a former newspaper reporter who worked as a screenwriter, editor and director at Universal in the 1910s. It was directed by Henry MacRae who had made over 130 films for Universal, including early sound film such as Tarzan the Tiger (1929) and Flash Gordon (1936). MacRae directed other Indigenous-themed films such as The Bronze Bride (1917).

The film starred Phyllis Gordon as Watuma, Clarence Burton as Ezra Vance, Marie Walcamp as a young Kee-On-Ee, Lule Warrenton as Kee-On-Ee and William Clifford as Jack Ford.

== Release and reception ==
It was released on December 13, 1913. As of 2020, The Werewolf is a lost film as it was destroyed in a 1924 fire at Universal Studios.

From contemporary reviews, Moving Picture World found that "to those who care for much shooting and massacre, the picture will have appeal." while Motion Picture News declared the film to be "absolutely the most asinine affair ever produced [...] If this were a fairy story, it would be laughed at."

== Legacy ==
The film was one of the first films involving lycanthropy made in Canada. Craig Ian Mann wrote that The Werewolf was the first known werewolf film on record. In the early film cycle, at least two other films followed involving lycanthropy, including The Legend of the Phantom Tribe (1914), which was also written by Baldwin, directed by MacRae, and starring Clifford for 101 Bison. The other was The White Wolf (1914), which also involved an "Indian" theme with someone's spirit embodied within a wolf. The last known copy of the film was destroyed by a fire in 1924.

== See also ==
- List of lost films
