= Love's Boomerang =

1922 film

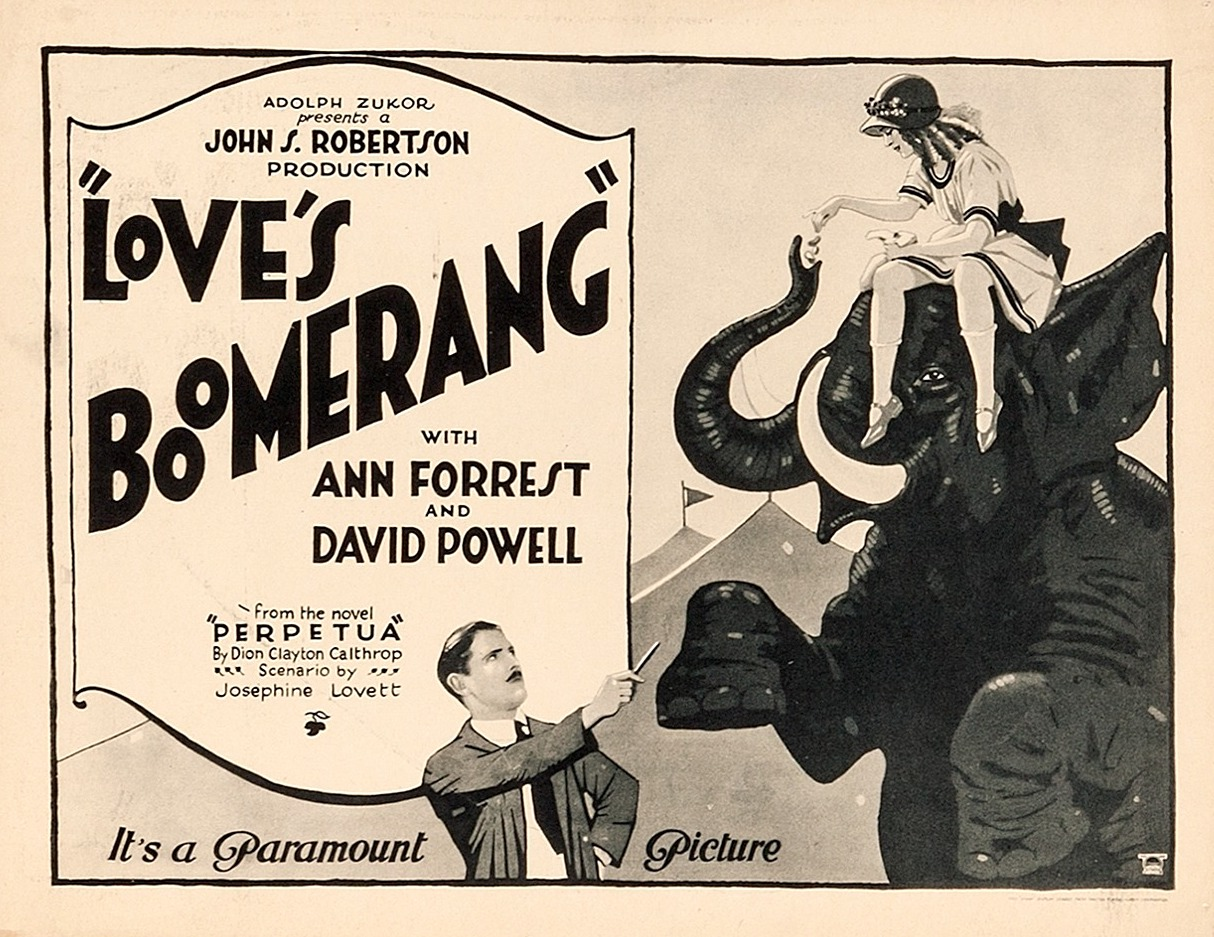
- Lobby card
- Directed by: John S. Robertson
- Written by: Josephine Lovett
- Based on: Perpetua by Dion Clayton Calthrop
- Produced by: Adolph Zukor
- Starring: Ann Forrest
- Cinematography: Roy F. Overbaugh
- Distributed by: Famous Players–Lasky British Producers
- Release date: 19 February 1922
- Running time: 62 minutes
- Country: United Kingdom
- Language: Silent (English intertitles)

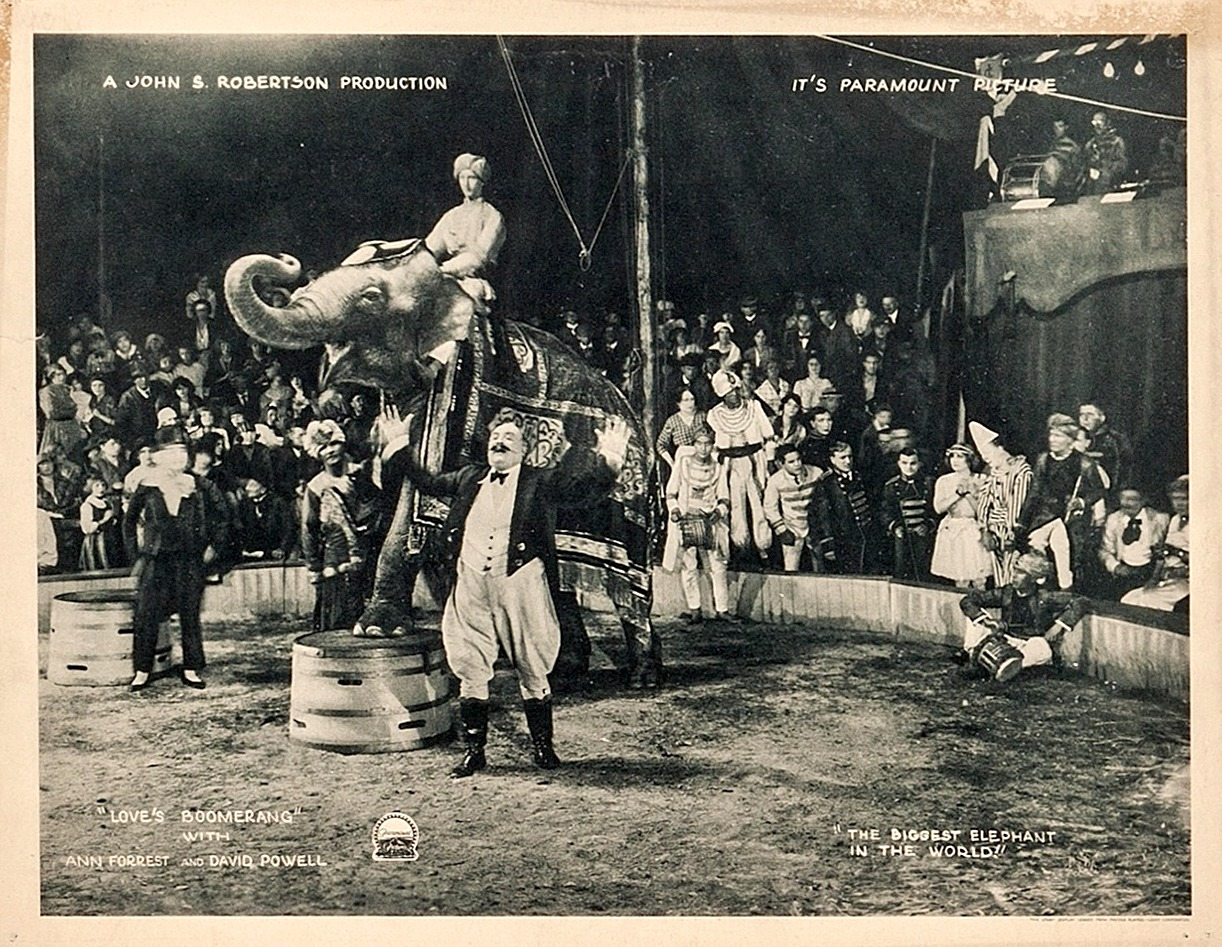
Scene from the film

Love's Boomerang (also known as Perpetua) is a 1922 British crime film directed by John S. Robertson. Alfred Hitchcock is credited as a title designer. The film is now lost.

== Plot ==
As described in a film magazine, young Perpetua, an orphan, is adopted by Brian McCree, an artist. The two go on a holiday tour through France where they meet Monsieur Lamballe, the owner of a circus. The circus elephant has been pawned by Lamballe, and the artist, seeking the discomfort in the eyes of Perpetua, buys the claim against the animal. The two wanders join the circus troupe. For several years the artist and girl travel with the circus, leading delightful vagabond lives. Later, Perpetua is sent to a convent and the discovery is made by the criminal Russell Felton that she is his abandoned daughter. The crook has been leading a youth, who is heir to some wealth, to physical destruction, and sees in Perpetua an opportunity to further assure himself of the fortune. The youth falls in love with the young woman who, urged by her father, marries him. Now Felton seeks to strengthen his scheme by forcing liquor on the youth, while Perpetua seeks to cure him of his cravings for drink. Hoping to hasten things, Felton poisons a drought which the young wife gives to her feverish husband. She is charged with murder and Felton's testimony results in a verdict of guilty. The dead youth had changed his will in Perpetua's favor, and Felton writes a confession and prepares to flee when a convict to whom Felton had promised money confronts him. In a gun duel both are killed. McCree, secretly working for Perpetua's freedom, meets her on her release, and they both realize their love for each other.

== Cast ==
- Ann Forrest as Perpetua
- Bunty Fosse as Perpetua, as a child
- David Powell as Brian McCree
- John Miltern as Russell Felton
- Roy Byford as Monsieur Lamballe
- Florence Wood as Madame Lamballe
- Geoffrey Kerr as Saville Mender
- Lillian Walker as Stella Daintry
- Lionel d'Aragon as Christian
- Ollie Emery as Madame Tourterelle
- Amy Willard as Jane Egg
- Tom Volbecque as Auguste
- Frank Stanmore as Corn Chandler

== See also ==
- Alfred Hitchcock filmography
