= A Soul for Sale =

- Directed by: Allen Holubar
- Written by: Evelyn Campbell; Elliott J. Clawson
- Starring: Dorothy Phillips; Katherine Kirkwood; Alan Roscoe
- Cinematography: Al Cawood
- Production company: Universal Pictures
- Distributed by: Universal Pictures
- Release date: May 19, 1918
- Running time: 60 minutes
- Country: United States
- Languages: Silent; English intertitles

A Soul for Sale is a 1918 American silent drama film directed by Allen Holubar and starring Dorothy Phillips, Katherine Kirkwood and Alan Roscoe. Prints and/or fragments were found in the Dawson Film Find in 1978.

== Cast ==
- Dorothy Phillips as Neila Pendleton
- Katherine Kirkwood as Mrs. Pendleton
- Alan Roscoe as Steele Minturn
- William Burress as Hale Faxon
- Harry Dunkinson as Wilbur Simons
- Joseph W. Girard as Garet Pendleton

== Bibliography ==
- Clive Hirschhorn. The Universal Story. Crown, 1983.
