= George Pearce (actor) =

American actor

George C. Pearce
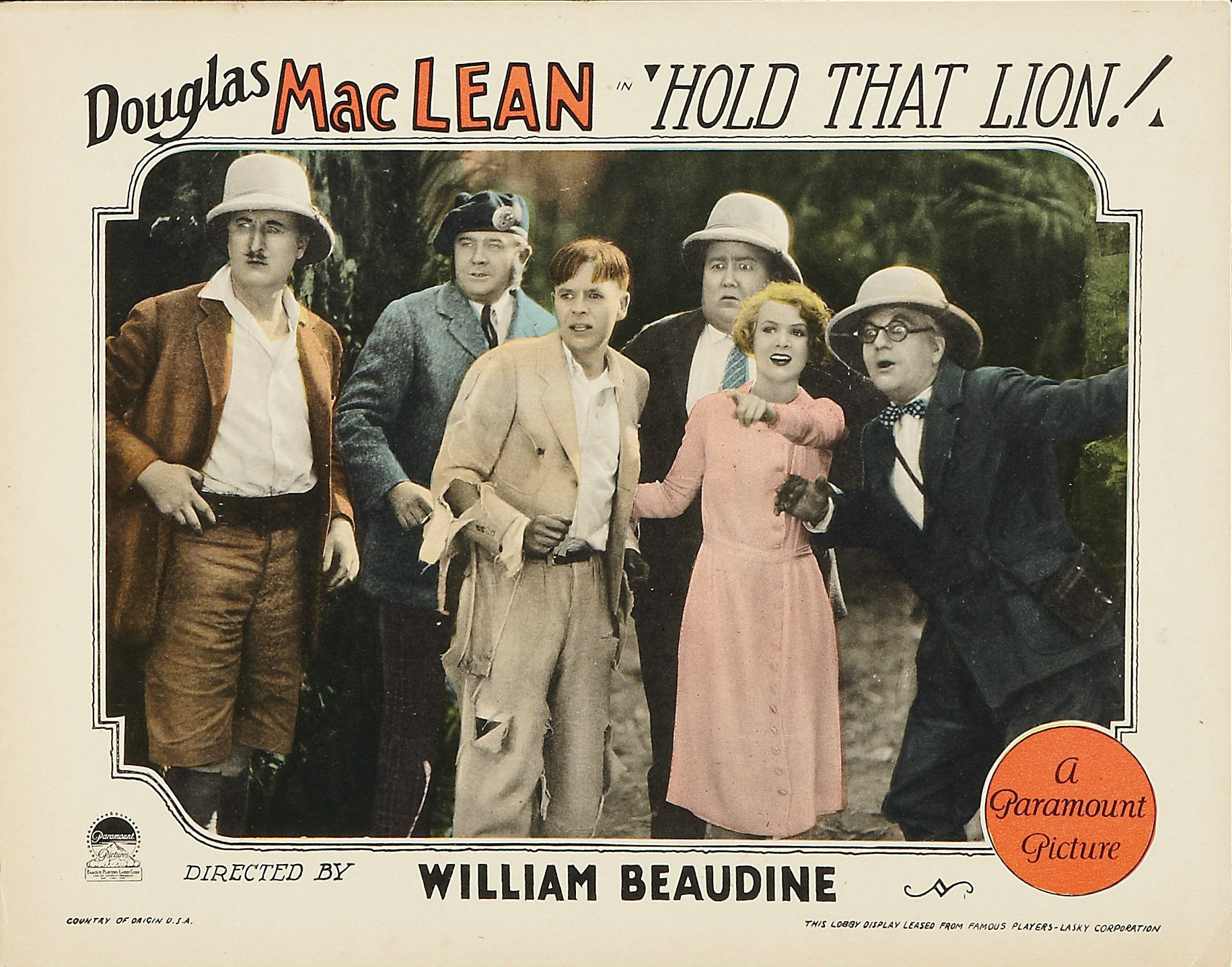
- Lobby card showing Pearce (right) in Hold That Lion, 1926
- Born: June 26, 1865; New York City, New York
- Died: August 13, 1940 (aged 75); Los Angeles, California
- Occupation: Actor
- Years active: 1914-1939

George C. Pearce (June 26, 1865 – August 13, 1940) was an American stage and film actor, primarily of the silent era. He appeared in more than 130 films between 1914 and 1939. He was born in New York, New York, and died in Los Angeles, California. He was also known as George C. Pierce.

Pearce also acted on stage, including portraying a doctor in White Cargo in Los Angeles in 1927. On Broadway, he acted in The Rainbow (1912), Billy (1909), The Mimic World (1908), D'Arcy of the Guards (1901), Manon Lescaut (1901), Brother Officers (1900), and Lord and Lady Algy (1899).

Pearce was a member of the Players Club in New York City.

Pearce died on August 12, 1940, at Cedars of Lebanon Hospital in Los Angeles following a two-week illness, aged 75.

== Selected filmography ==
- Let Katie Do It (1916)
- Daphne and the Pirate (1916)
- The Little School Ma'am (1916)
- A Jewel in Pawn (1917)
- A Wife on Trial (1917)
- Treason (1917)
- Because of a Woman (1917)
- The Reed Case (1917)
- '49–'17 (1917)
- Desert Law (1918)
- Everywoman's Husband (1918)
- The Sea Flower (1918)
- A Gentleman of Quality (1919)
- A Yankee Princess (1919)
- The Mayor of Filbert (1919)
- Her Husband's Friend (1920)
- Traveling Salesman (1921)
- Black Beauty (1921)
- Three Word Brand (1921)
- Watch Your Step (1922)
- The Primitive Lover (1922)
- The Midnight Alarm (1923)
- The Printer's Devil (1923)
- Cornered (1924)
- Wandering Husbands (1924)
- Hold Your Breath (1924)
- The Narrow Street (1925)
- Hold That Lion (1926)
- The Social Highwayman (1926)
- The Drop Kick (1927)
- The Irresistible Lover (1927)
- Quarantined Rivals (1927)
- Home, James (1928)
- Wild West Romance (1928)
- Do Your Duty (1928)
- Masquerade (1929)
- The Lone Rider (1930)
- The Right to Love (1930)
- Vengeance (1930)
- Personality (1930)
- The Right of Way (1931)
- Billboard Girl (1931)
- This Reckless Age (1932)
- The Man Called Back (1932)
- Lone Cowboy (1933)
- Mrs. Wiggs of the Cabbage Patch (1934)
- Fighting Shadows (1935)
- The Revenge Rider (1935)
