= The Poppy Girl's Husband =

1919 film by William S. Hart

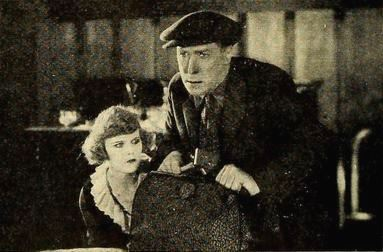
- Juanita Hansen and William S. Hart
- Directed by: William S. Hart; Lambert Hillyer
- Screenplay by: Jules Boyle; C. Gardner Sullivan
- Produced by: Thomas H. Ince; William S. Hart
- Starring: William S. Hart; Juanita Hansen; Walter Long; Fred Starr; David Kirby; Georgie Stone
- Cinematography: Joseph H. August
- Production company: William S. Hart Productions
- Distributed by: Paramount Pictures
- Release date: March 16, 1919
- Running time: 50 minutes
- Country: United States
- Language: Silent (English intertitles)

The Poppy Girl's Husband is a 1919 American silent drama film directed by William S. Hart and Lambert Hillyer and written by Jules Boyle and C. Gardner Sullivan. The film stars William S. Hart, Juanita Hansen, Walter Long, Fred Starr, David Kirby and Georgie Stone. The film was released on March 16, 1919, by Paramount Pictures.

A copy of the film is held in the Museum of Modern Art film archive.

== Plot ==
As described in a film magazine, Hairpin Harry Dutton is released from prison after serving ten years of a fourteen-year sentence. His old friend Boston Blackie takes him to San Francisco where he learns that Polly, the wife he believed to have faithful, has divorced him and married the policeman who testified against him. He meets his ten-year-old son surreptitiously and they become great friends. Polly learns of his presence, and her husband promises to "plant a gun on him" and send him back to prison. The boy hears this and innocently tells his father in time. Harry then goes to the detective's home and is about to brand his former wife on her cheek for her faithlessness when his son intervenes and asks Harry to take him away. Harry leaves the woman unharmed and takes his son, and they find happiness in the wilderness.

== Cast ==
- William S. Hart as Hairpin Harry Dutton
- Juanita Hansen as Polly Dutton
- Walter Long as Boston Blackie
- Fred Starr as Big Mike McCafferty
- David Kirby as The Montana Kid
- Georgie Stone as Donald Dutton
- Leo Pierson as Henchman (uncredited)
