= A Wife on Trial =

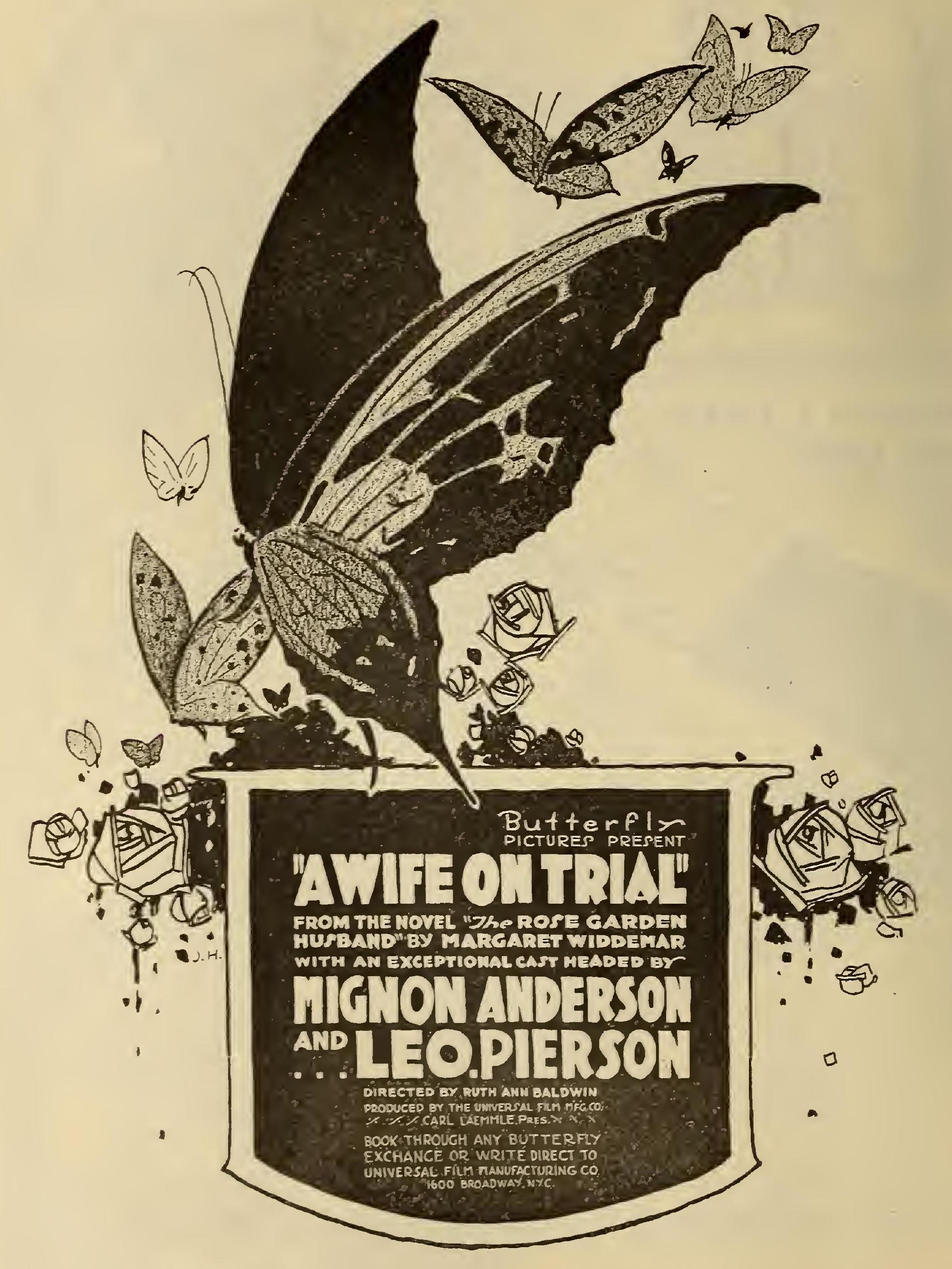
- Trade advertisement
- Directed by: Ruth Ann Baldwin
- Written by: Leo Pierson
- Based on: The Rose-Garden Husband by Margaret Widdemer
- Starring: Mignon Anderson; Leo Pierson; L. M. Wells
- Cinematography: Stephen S. Norton
- Edited by: Roy Dixon
- Production company: Universal Pictures
- Distributed by: Universal Pictures
- Release date: July 30, 1917
- Running time: 50 minutes
- Country: United States
- Language: Silent (English intertitles)

A Wife on Trial is a 1917 American silent drama film directed by Ruth Ann Baldwin and starring Mignon Anderson, Leo Pierson, and L.M. Wells.

This film is considered a lost film.

== Cast ==
- Mignon Anderson as Phyllis Narcissa
- Leo Pierson as Allan Harrington
- L.M. Wells as Horace de Guenther
- Julia Jackson as Mrs. de Guenther
- George C. Pearce as Wallis

== Preservation ==
With no prints of A Wife on Trial located in any film archives, it is considered a lost film. In February 2021, the film was cited by the National Film Preservation Board on their Lost U.S. Silent Feature Films.

== Bibliography ==
- Donald W. McCaffrey & Christopher P. Jacobs. Guide to the Silent Years of American Cinema. Greenwood Publishing, 1999. ISBN 0-313-30345-2
