= Mary Rider =

American screenwriter and playwright

- Born: Mary Kirk Rider; November 20, 1876; Pekin, Illinois, USA
- Died: Unknown
- Other names: Mary Rider Mechtold
- Occupation(s): Screenwriter, playwright, journalist
- Years active: 1907–1923
- Spouse: Reuben Maynard

Mary Rider (sometimes credited as Mary Rider Mechtold) (born 1876) was an American screenwriter, playwright, and short story writer active primarily during the 1910s.

== Biography ==
Mary was born in Illinois to judge George Rider and his wife, Elizabeth Prettyman, in Pekin, Illinois. Later on, she attended the Chicago University.

She began to write plays as well as short stories during the 1910s that appeared in publications like Sunset, Metropolitan, and Munsey's Magazine. She also wrote for vaudeville before writing stories for the screen during Hollywood's silent era. One of her earliest stories to hit the screen was 1914's The Mountain Rat. Over the next few years, she would go on to write a dozen or so shorts and features.

She married the lawyer Reuben Maynard (died 1945, survived by Mary) in New York City in 1916. The couple had no children.

== Selected filmography ==
- Sunshine Alley (1917)
- Behind the Lines (1916)
- The Snowbird (1916)
- Gladiola (1915)
- The Way Back (1915)
- The Mountain Girl (1915) (short)
- Indiscretion (1915) (short)
- At the Stroke of the Angelus (1915) (short)
- Killed Against Orders (1915) (short)
- Ashes of the Past (1914) (short)
- The Temple of Moloch (1914) (short)
- The Old Derelict (1914) (short)
- The Mountain Rat (1914) (short)
