= Roy H. Klaffki =

American cinematographer

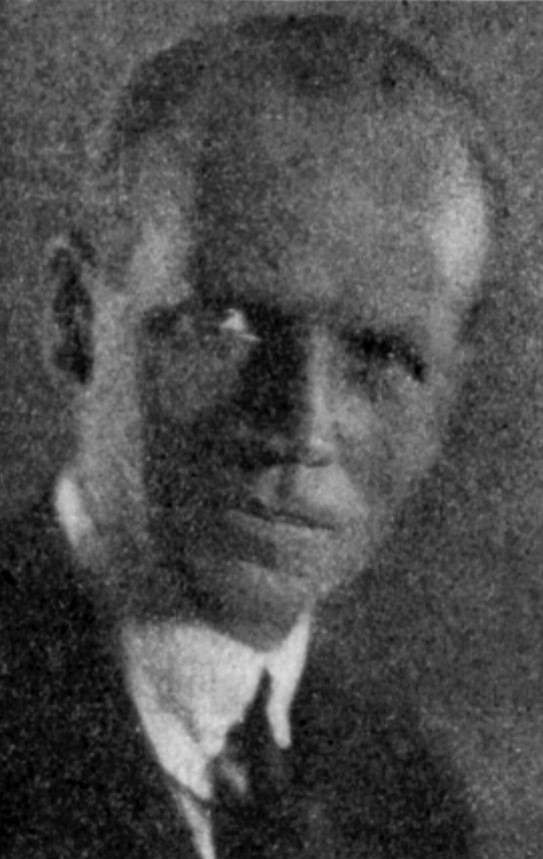
- Born: 1882
- Died: September 20, 1965 (aged 82–83); Los Angeles, California, United States
- Occupation: Cinematographer
- Years active: 1916–1932 (film)

Roy H. Klaffki (1882–1965) was an American cinematographer. He was a founding member of the American Society of Cinematographers in 1919.

== Selected filmography ==
- A Yoke of Gold (1916)
- Barriers of Society (1916)
- The Unattainable (1916)
- Black Friday (1916)
- The Morals of Hilda (1916)
- The Reed Case (1917)
- Treason (1917)
- The Field of Honor (1917)
- Sirens of the Sea (1917)
- The Lash of Power (1917)
- The Wife He Bought (1918)
- Married in Haste (1919)
- His Divorced Wife (1919)
- The Phantom Melody (1920)
- Her Five-Foot Highness (1920)
- Human Stuff (1920)
- The Infamous Miss Revell (1921)
- Three of a Kind (1925)
- Secret Orders (1926)
- The Jade Cup (1926)
- The Adorable Deceiver (1926)
- The Impostor (1926)
- Flame of the Argentine (1926)
- Queen o'Diamonds (1926)
- The Tired Business Man (1927)
- The Wedding March (1928)

== Bibliography ==
- Slide, Anthony. The New Historical Dictionary of the American Film Industry. Routledge, 2014.
- Solomon, Aubrey. The Fox Film Corporation, 1915-1935: A History and Filmography. McFarland, 2011.
