= Gladiola (film) =

1915 film by John H. Collins

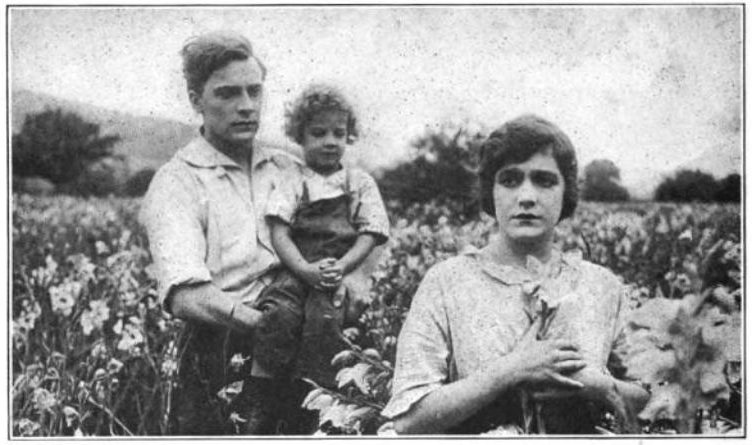
- Directed by: John H. Collins
- Written by: Mary Rider
- Starring: Viola Dana; Charles Sutton; Pat O'Malley; Robert Conness
- Cinematography: Ned Van Buren
- Distributed by: Edison
- Release date: October 15, 1915
- Running time: 3000 ft (approx.)
- Country: United States
- Languages: Silent; English intertitles

Gladiola is a three-reel American silent drama produced by the Edison Company. The script, by Mary Rider, was written specifically as a vehicle for Viola Dana.

== Production ==
Gladiola was Edison Company production number 7985. The production was shot largely at the Edison Company's studio at Decatur Avenue and Oliver Place in the Bronx, with additional "exterior scenes taken in the gladiolus fields of Berlin, N.Y." Gladioli are used as a visual leitmotif throughout the film.

The production was able to locate a two-day-old baby, identified as "Master Warren Scott Moore," to play the title character's newborn baby in one scene. In publicity for the film, Edison hyped Moore's status as the youngest actor on the screen. Publicity noted that "Master Moore" shared his scene with Harry Linson, thought to be one of the oldest working actors on the screen at age 67.

Director John H. Collins and star Viola Dana were married the same year this film was produced.

== Release ==
Gladiola was released in the United States on October 15, 1915. It debuted in Palmerston North in late March 1916, and in Wellington in early April. It was first shown in Oamaru on November 10, 1916.
