= The Medicine Man (1917 film) =

1917 film

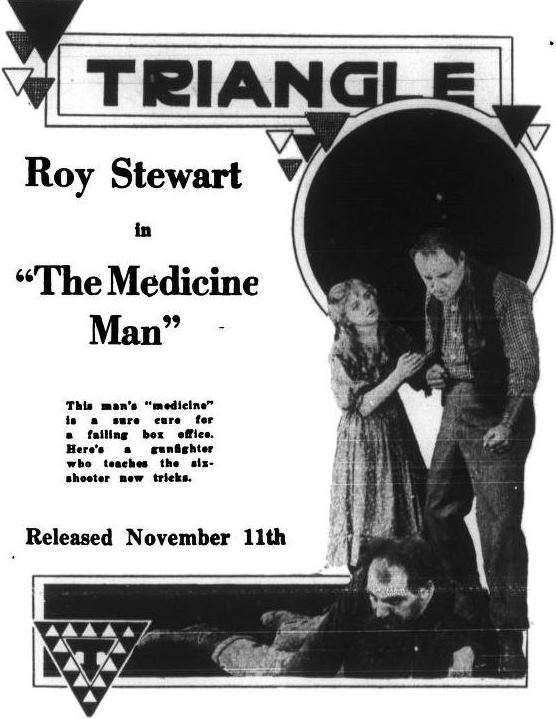
- Directed by: Clifford Smith
- Written by: Jack Cunningham; Alan James
- Starring: Roy Stewart; Ann Forrest; Percy Challenger
- Cinematography: C.G. Crane
- Production company: Triangle Film Corporation
- Distributed by: Triangle Distributing
- Release date: November 11, 1917
- Running time: 50 minutes
- Country: United States
- Languages: Silent; English intertitles

The Medicine Man is a 1917 American silent Western film directed by Clifford Smith and starring Roy Stewart, Ann Forrest and Percy Challenger.

== Cast ==
- Roy Stewart as Jim Walton
- Ann Forrest as Edith Strang
- Percy Challenger as Seth Hopkins
- Aaron Edwards as Joe Maslone
- William Fairbanks as Luther Hill
- Wilbur Higby as Doc Hamilton

== Preservation ==
With no holdings located in archives, The Medicine Man is considered a lost film.

== Bibliography ==
- Paul C. Spehr & Gunnar Lundquist. American Film Personnel and Company Credits, 1908-1920. McFarland, 1996.
