= Sunshine Alley =

1917 silent film directed by John W. Noble

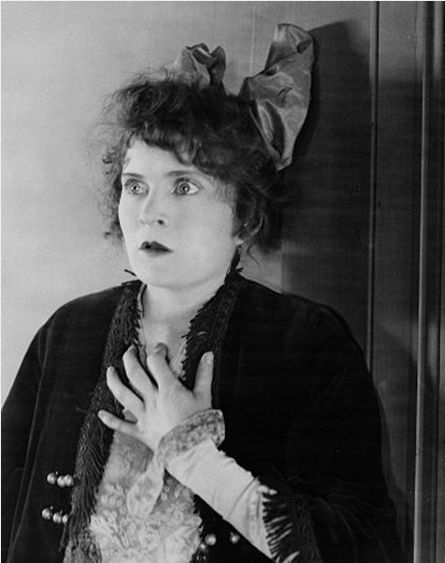
- Still with Mae Marsh
- Directed by: John W. Noble
- Screenplay by: Mary Rider
- Produced by: Samuel Goldwyn
- Starring: Mae Marsh; Robert Harron; Dion Titheradge
- Cinematography: George W. Hill
- Production company: Goldwyn Pictures Corporation
- Release date: November 3, 1917
- Running time: 60 minutes
- Country: United States
- Language: Silent (English intertitles)

Sunshine Alley is a 1917 American silent drama film directed by John W. Noble and produced by Samuel Goldwyn. It was written by screenwriter Mary Rider specifically as a vehicle for actress Mae Marsh.

== Plot ==
The film—which was lauded for its sympathy toward animals—centers on a relationship between a young woman who helps out at her grandfather's bird store and a millionaire's son.

== Cast ==
- Mae Marsh as Nell
- Robert Harron as Ned
- Dion Titheradge as Carlo
- James A. Furey as Harbost (credited as J.A. Furey)
- Edward See as Cobbler (credited as Ed See)
- John Charles as Ben Davis
- William T. Carleton as Mr. Morris (credited as W.T. Carleton)
- Isabel Berwin as Isabel Berwin
- Jack Grey as Detective
