= The Reed Case =

1917 film

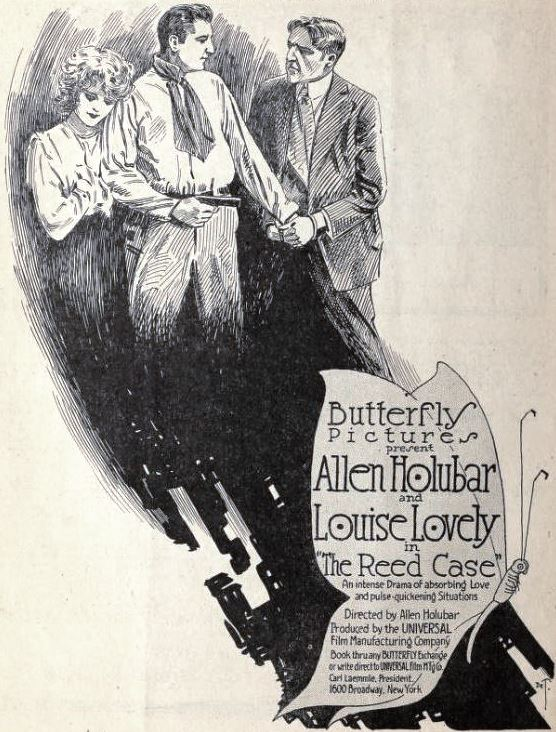
- Directed by: Allen Holubar
- Written by: Allen Holubar
- Starring: Allen Holubar; Louise Lovely; Fred Montague
- Cinematography: Roy H. Klaffki
- Production company: Universal Pictures
- Distributed by: Universal Pictures
- Release date: July 9, 1917
- Running time: 50 minutes
- Country: United States
- Languages: Silent; English intertitles

The Reed Case is a 1917 American silent drama film directed by Allen Holubar and starring Holubar, Louise Lovely and Fred Montague

== Cast ==
- Allen Holubar as Jerry Brennon
- Louise Lovely as Helen Reed
- Alfred Allen as Bull Renfroy
- Fred Montague as Chief Grady
- George C. Pearce as Senator Reed
- Sydney Deane as John Reed
- Nanine Wright as Mrs. John Reed
- Ernest Shields as Schuyler Hastings
- Ed Brady as 'Red'

== Preservation ==
The film is considered lost.

== Bibliography ==
- Robert B. Connelly. The Silents: Silent Feature Films, 1910-36, Volume 40, Issue 2. December Press, 1998.
