= Eugenie Magnus Ingleton =

British screenwriter (1873–1936)

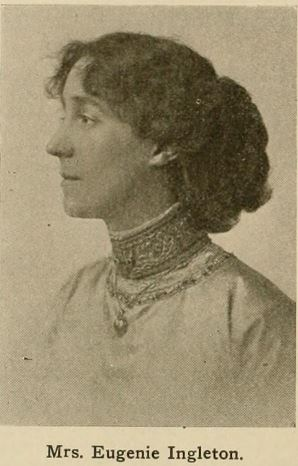
- Born: 1873; London, United Kingdom
- Died: 3 August 1936 (aged 62–63); Los Angeles, United States
- Occupation: Screenwriter

Eugenie Magnus Ingleton (1873 – 3 August 1936) was a British screenwriter, actress, and war correspondent. She started acting on the stage at the age of ten playing Little Eva in Uncle Tom’s Cabin. She worked as a war correspondent in South Africa during the Second Boer War before moving to the United States. She worked mainly as a screenwriter but got also involved in stage design and other tasks around the set.

== Selected filmography ==
- The Butterfly on the Wheel (1915)
- Trilby (1915)
- The Reward of the Faithless (1917)
- The Lair of the Wolf (1917)
- Heart Strings (1917)
- The Pulse of Life (1917)
- Because of a Woman (1917)
- The Birth of Patriotism (1917)
- The Moonstone (1915)
- The Loyalty of Taro San (1918)
- Love's Prisoner (1919)
- The Blue Bonnet (1919)
- Below the Surface (1920)
- The Secret of the Hills (1921)
- Alimony (1924)
- The Scarlet Honeymoon (1925)
- The Kiss Barrier (1925)
