= The Mountain Rat =

1914 silent film directed by James Kirkwood Sr.

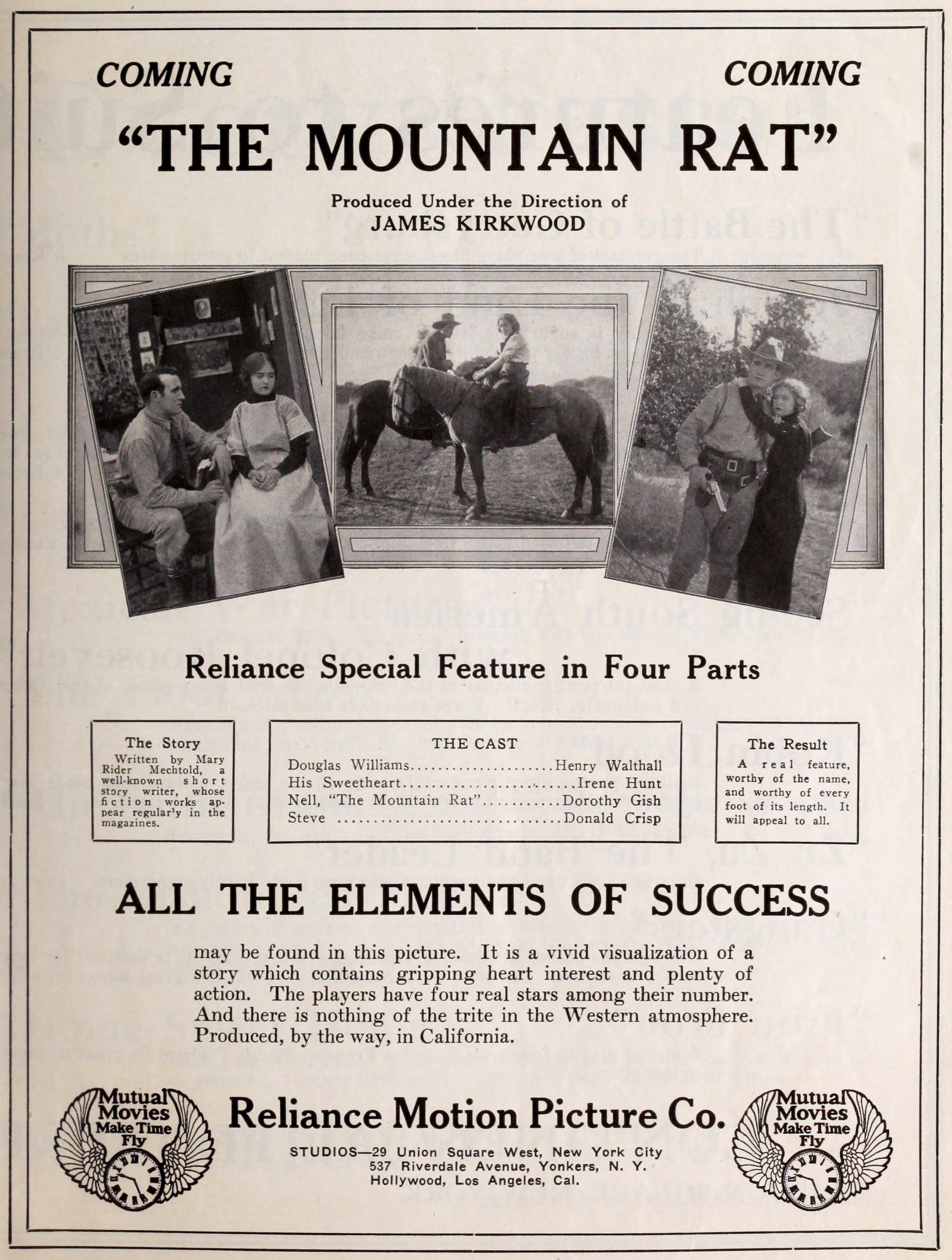
- Contemporary advertisement
- Directed by: James Kirkwood Sr.
- Written by: Mary Rider (story); Frank E. Woods (scenario)
- Starring: Henry B. Walthall; Irene Hunt; Dorothy Gish
- Production company: Biograph Company
- Distributed by: Mutual Film
- Release date: May 1914 (USA)
- Running time: 4 reels

The Mountain Rat is a 1914 silent four-reel film directed by James Kirkwood for Biograph. The film—described as "a drama of daring and romance in the Western wilds"—is notable for being one of the biggest early screen appearances of actress Dorothy Gish.

== Plot ==
After an argument, Douglas Williams' fiancée, Harriet, returns the engagement ring. Discouraged, he soon heads out west, where he meets and falls for a dancer named Nell, known as the Mountain Rat in a dance hall at a mining camp. Nell has been shunned by the more "respectable" women of the community, but Douglas doesn't care; he marries her on the spur of the moment. Drama ensues when Douglas's mother and former fiancée come looking for him and he's forced to choose.

== Cast ==
- Henry B. Walthall as Douglas Williams
- Irene Hunt as Harriet
- Dorothy Gish as Nell, the Mountain Rat
- Donald Crisp as Steve
- Josephine Crowell as Mrs. Williams
