= Sirens of the Sea (film) =

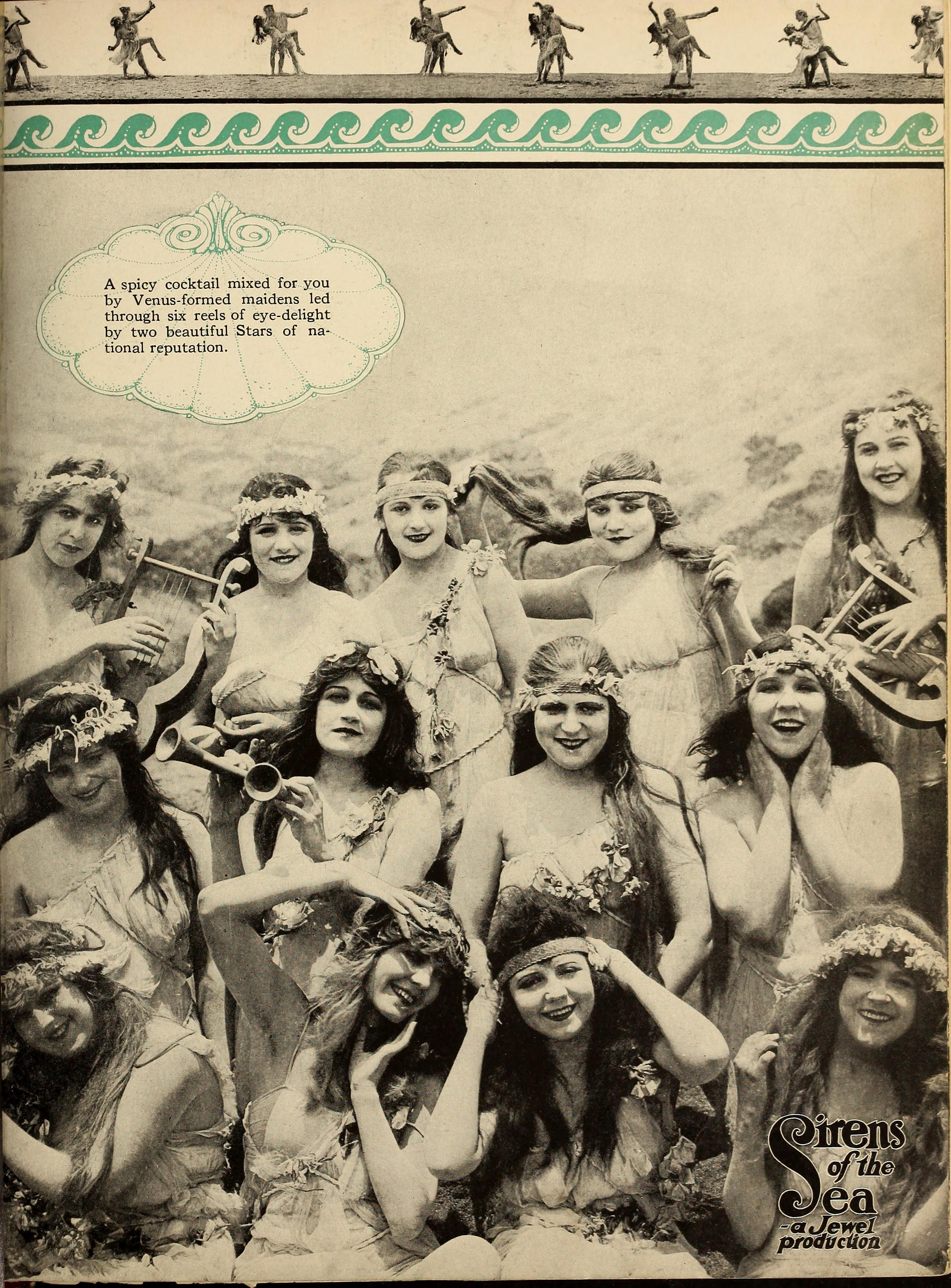
- Advertisement
- Directed by: Allen Holubar
- Written by: Allen Holubar (scenario); Grace Helen Bailey (screen story)
- Starring: Louise Lovely; Carmel Myers; Jack Mulhall
- Cinematography: Roy H. Klaffki
- Edited by: Grant Whytock
- Production company: Jewel Productions
- Distributed by: Universal Film Manufacturing Company
- Release date: September 20, 1917
- Running time: 6 reels
- Country: United States
- Language: Silent (English intertitles)

Sirens of the Sea is a 1917 American silent fantasy film directed and written by Allen Holubar based upon a screen story by Grace Helen Bailey. Featuring Louise Lovely, it was distributed by the Jewel Productions division of Universal Film Manufacturing Company. It is not known whether the film currently survives.

== Plot ==
As described in a film magazine, a little girl, cast up from the sea in a fisherman's net from a wrecked ship, is adopted by the wealthy Wellington Stanhope (Deane) and his wife (Wright). The girl is the only survivor of the lost ship and no one knows anything about her. Eighteen years elapse and the child appears as the young debutante Sybil (Lovely) at a birthday party where she meets Hartley Royce (Quinn) and Gerald Waldron (Mulhall), who both fall in love with her. Julie (Myers) is jealous of Sybil, and plots with Harley to keep her separated from Gerald. Sybil tries to have Hadji (Selbie) tell the fortunes of the guests. While on an errand Sybil is followed by the impetuous Hartley who takes her in his arms, and to avoid him she jumps off a cliff into the sea. As the guests from the party search for her in boats, Gerald Waldron has a dream in which witches, spirits, nymphs, and sirens dance and plot on the beach at night. During the allegorical dream love (represented by Lovely) overcomes evil (represented by Myers). The spirits are driven away at the break of day and Gerald wakes up, finds his sweetheart Sybil on the beach, and takes her home.

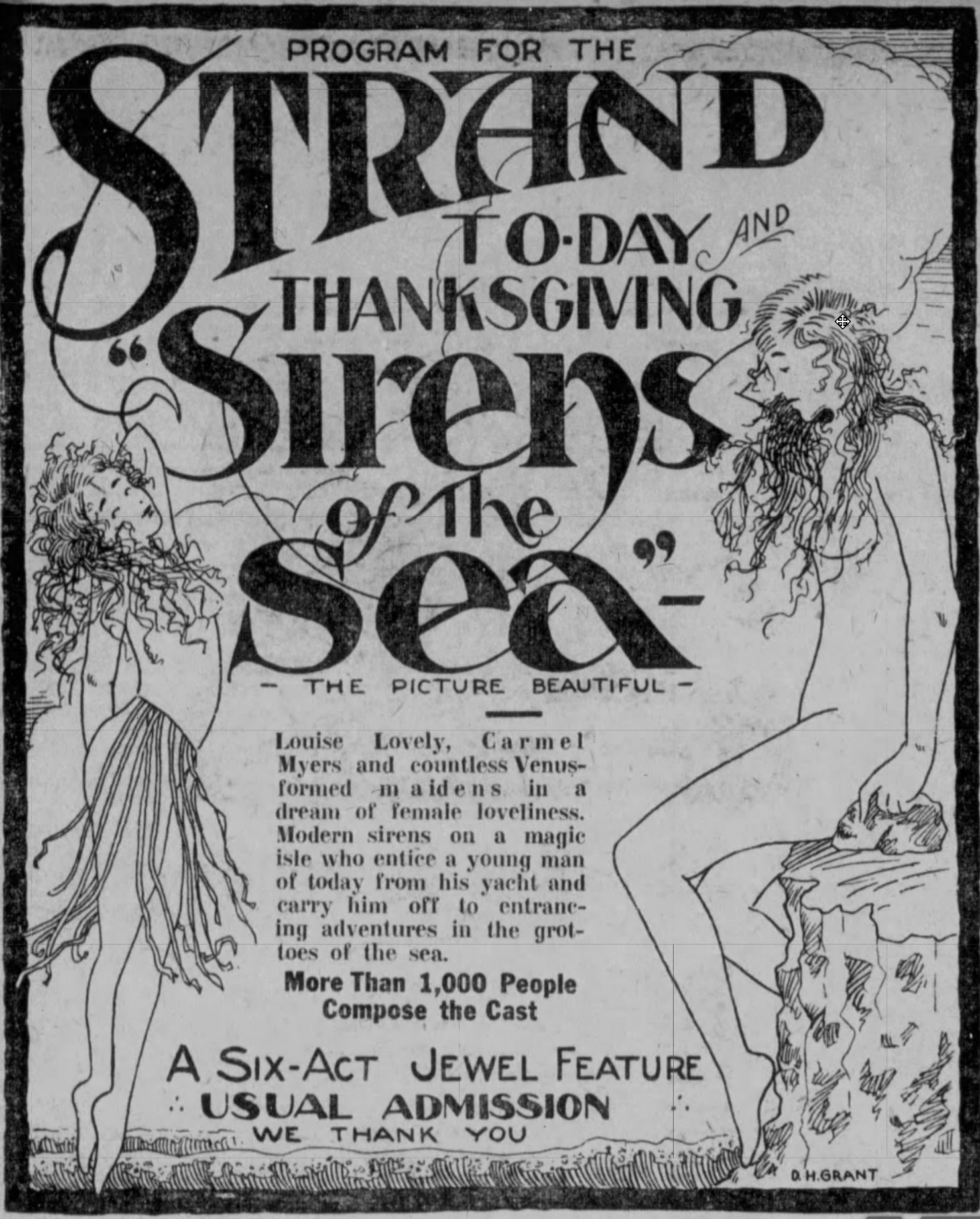
Advertisement by Nasheville's Strand Theater

== Cast ==
- Louise Lovely as Sybil (and / or Lorelei ?)
- Carmel Myers as Julie
- Jack Mulhall as Gerald Waldron
- Sydney Deane as Wellington Stanhope
- Helen Wright as Mrs. Stanhope
- Evelyn Selbie as Hadji
- William Quinn as Hartley Royce
- Sally Blane as Child (credited as Elizabeth Jane Young)
- John R. Young as Child (credited as Jack Young)
- Loretta Young as Child (credited as Gretchen Young)
- Polly Ann Young (uncredited child extra)

== Production ==
Location scenes were shot at Santa Catalina Island, one of the Channel Islands of California.

== Reception ==
Like many American films of the time, Sirens of the Sea was subject to cuts by city and state film censorship boards. For example, the Chicago Board of Censors required a cut of three scenes of women diving underwater and exposing their backs, the flashing of three scenes of the "Spirit of Sorrow" on a rock, and the cut of five scenes of nude women in the "Cave of Giants".

== External list ==
- Sirens of the Sea at IMDb
- Film still at wisconsinhistory.org
