= At the Stroke of the Angelus =

1915 silent short starring Charles Clary

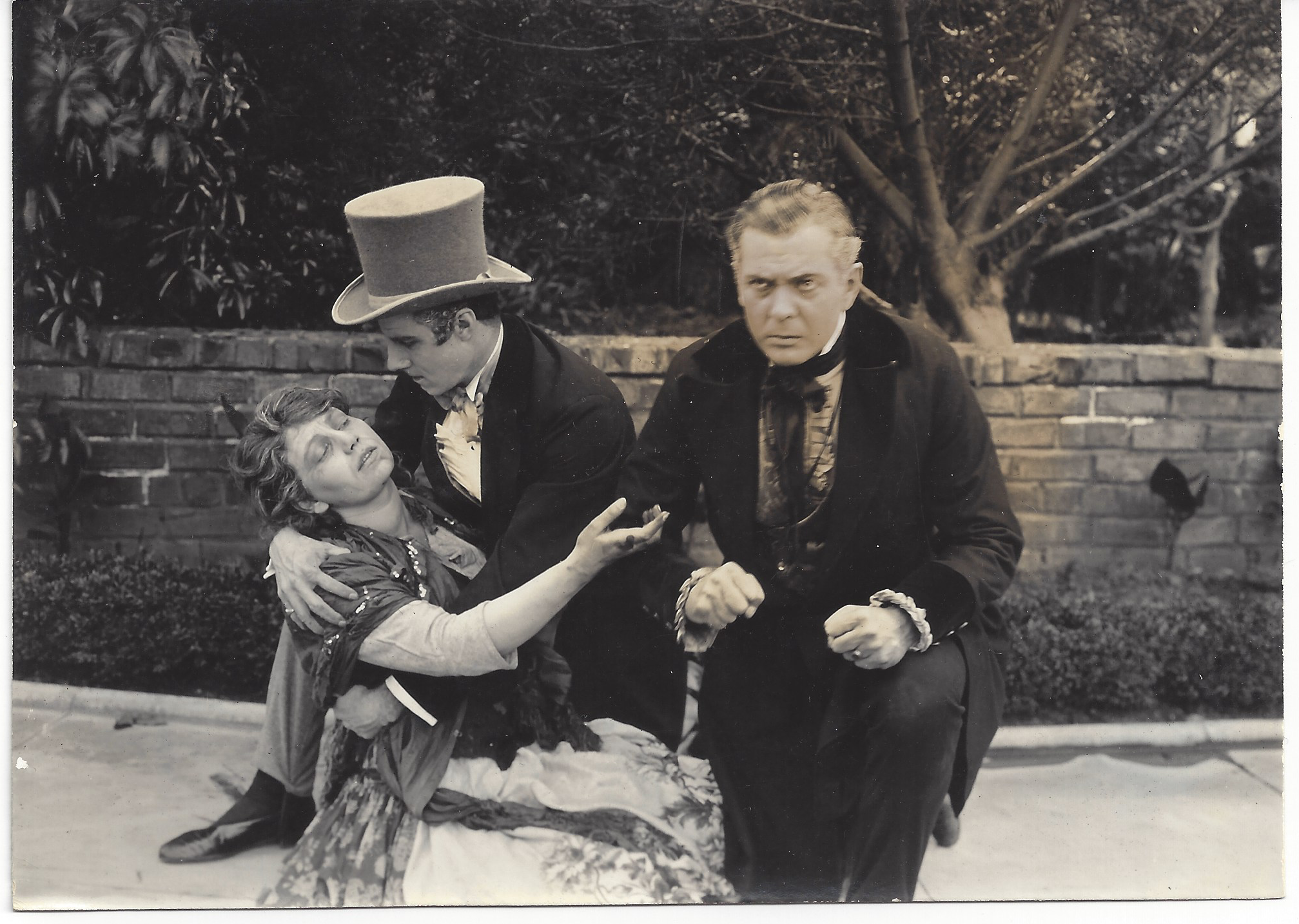
- Scene from the film
- Written by: Mary Rider
- Starring: Charles Clary, Francelia Billington
- Production company: Majestic Motion Picture Company
- Distributed by: Mutual Film Corporation
- Release date: May 16, 1915 (U.S.)
- Running time: 2 reels
- Country: United States
- Language: Silent (English intertitles)

At the Stroke of the Angelus is a 1915 American silent short film starring Charles Clary and Francelia Billington. Billington portrays an American girl kidnapped in early childhood and brought up as a Mexican thief and street dancer. She falls in love with a wealthy American, who they come to believe may be her uncle.

== Synopsis ==
On a 1850s migration trail, John Ford must leave a stranded wagon train in search of help. Left behind are his ailing sister, Amy, and her young daughter, and they die shortly after John's departure. Only an unrelated young girl survives. Outlaw Pedro ransacks the wagons, kidnapping the surviving girl and placing Amy's heirloom necklace around the girl's throat.

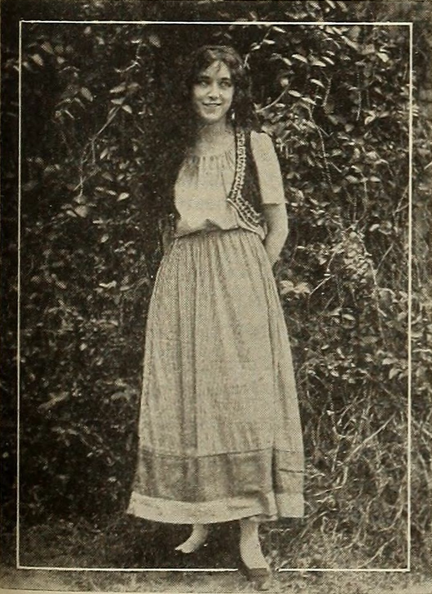
Francelia Billington as Anita

Pedro raises the girl as his foster daughter, Anita. At age eighteen, she works for Pedro in Mexico as a thief and street dancer. She meets and falls in love with John, with neither knowing of their shared history. Pedro becomes jealous, and Anita intervenes to save John's life. Afterward, in her hut, Anita lifts her crucifix as the Angelus bell strikes. John recognizes his sister's chain, and departs, believing Anita must be his niece. Later, Pedro is caught robbing a mission altar. His conscience compels him to confess that Anita is not John's niece, and the lovers are reunited.

== Cast ==
- Charles Clary as John Ford
- Francelia Billington as Anita
- Edward Warren as Pedro
- Anna Mae Walthall as Señorita Ynez (as Anna May Walthall)
- Wilbur Higby as Anita's father
