= The Double Standard =

- Directed by: Phillips Smalley
- Written by: Elliott J. Clawson; Brand Whitlock
- Starring: Roy Stewart; Clarissa Selwynne; Joseph W. Girard
- Cinematography: Stephen S. Norton
- Production company: Universal Pictures
- Distributed by: Universal Pictures
- Release date: September 23, 1917
- Running time: 50 minutes
- Country: United States
- Languages: Silent; English intertitles

The Double Standard is a 1917 American silent drama film directed by Phillips Smalley and starring Roy Stewart, Clarissa Selwynne and Joseph W. Girard. The film duration is 50 minutes. As of 2021, this film was considered lost.

== Premise ==
The American Film Institute offers a plot summary based on contemporary sources. It contains elements of melodrama. It revolves around a newly elected court judge, John Fairbrother, who leads a morality crusade against the dance halls and cafés of his city.

== Cast ==
- Roy Stewart as John Fairbrother
- Clarissa Selwynne as Grace Fairbrother
- Joseph W. Girard as Bishop Ferguson
- Frank Elliott as Charles Ferguson
- Hazel Page as Mace
- Frank Brownlee as Editor George Ferguson
- Irene Aldwyn as Lily
- Maxfield Stanley as Albert
- Dana Ong as Lawyer

== Reception ==
A review in Variety found the plot confusing and stated, "The story, or what appeared of it, has a strain similar to that compounded in Herman Lieb’s vaudeville sketch "Dope"."

== Bibliography ==
- Robert B. Connelly. The Silents: Silent Feature Films, 1910-36, Volume 40, Issue 2. December Press, 1998.
