= Desert Law (1918 film) =

1918 film

- Directed by: Jack Conway
- Written by: George Elwood Jenks; Louis H. Kilpatrick
- Starring: Gayne Whitman; Jack Richardson; George C. Pearce
- Cinematography: William M. Edmond
- Production company: Triangle Film Corporation
- Distributed by: Triangle Distributing
- Release date: September 15, 1918
- Running time: 5 reels
- Country: United States
- Languages: Silent; English intertitles

Desert Law is a 1918 American silent Western film directed by Jack Conway and starring Gayne Whitman, Jack Richardson and George C. Pearce.

== Plot summary ==
Don McLane and Julia Wharton are engaged. Rufe Dorsey, the local boss, who is above the law, covets Julia and "frames" Don for murder. He is given a prison sentence. Don is liberated at a junction point by Julia's brothers, and they beat a retreat to the Wharton homestead, whither Dorsey goes to get the prisoner again. A stranger who recently appeared in the town joins the defending forces, and when the fight goes against them, he reveals himself to Dorsey as the Governor of the state. Dorsey has gone too far and determines to kill the Governor too, but the Governor has sent for the militia and they arrive in time to rescue the besieged, while a friend of Don's rides in with the "murdered" man, who was "very much alive this morning, but plenty dead now," for he had been shot in self defense.

== Cast ==
- Gayne Whitman as Donald McLane
- Jack Richardson as Rufe Dorsey
- George C. Pearce as The Stranger
- Leota Lorraine as Julia Wharton
- Ray Hanford as Sheriff
- Bert Appling as Deputy
- Jim Farley as Deputy
- Phil Gastrock as Logan
- Joseph Singleton as Jim
- Leo Pierson as Dick
- Curley Baldwin as Buck

== Reception ==
Variety's review was positive, and found both the direction and cinematography to both be excellent despite the unoriginal story.

== Preservation ==
With no holdings located in archives, Desert Law is considered a lost film.

== Bibliography ==
- James Robert Parish & Michael R. Pitts. Film directors: a guide to their American films. Scarecrow Press, 1974.
