= William Wallace Cook =

American journalist and author (1867–1933)

- Born: April 11, 1867; Marshall, Calhoun County, Michigan, United States
- Died: July 20, 1933 (aged 65); Marshall, Calhoun County, Michigan, United States
- Occupation: Author
- Writing career
- Genres: Westerns and Dime novels

William Wallace Cook (1867–1933) also known by the pen-name John Milton Edwards, was an American journalist and writer of popular fiction. His works include westerns, adventure stories, dime novels, serials and screen and stage plays. He is best remembered for his science-fiction works.

Cook also created Plotto, a system for plot suggestion and content structure that fiction writers can use. This came out in the 1920s, and in 1934 came out with a 7 part instruction guide.

As by John Milton Edwards he wrote The Fiction Factory: Being the Experience of a Writer Who, for Twenty-Two Years, has Kept a Story-Mill Grinding Successfully in 1912.

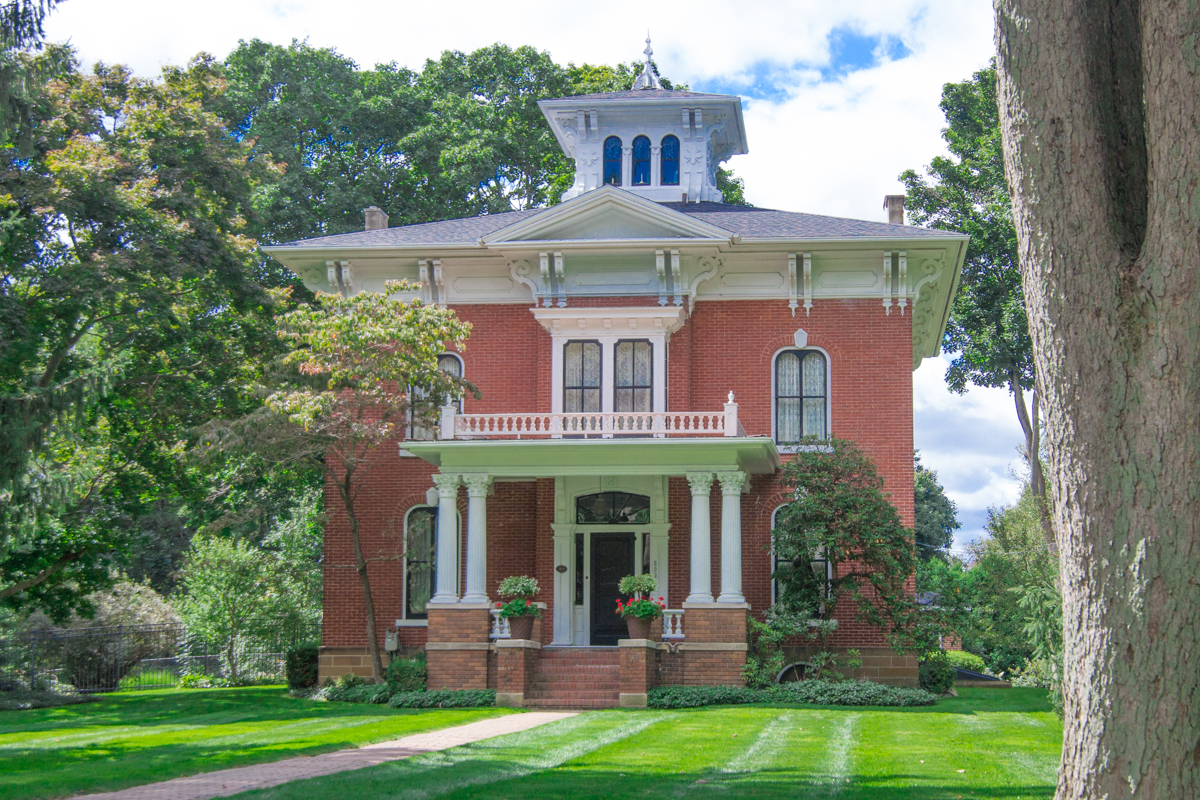
The home of William Wallace Cook

== Works ==
- Cast Away at the Pole (1904)
- Adrift in the Unknown (1905)
- Marooned in 1492 (1905)
- The Fiction Factory (1912)
- Gold Grabbers (1914)
- Around The World In Eighty Hours (1920)
- A Round Trip to the Year 2000 (1925)
- Plotto (1928).
- Plotto: The Master Book of All Plots (1934, 1941)
