= Stephen S. Norton =

American cinematographer

Stephen Seymour Norton (October 13, 1877, in Palmyra, New York – March 14, 1951, in Los Angeles, California) was an American cinematographer.

== Filmography ==
- The Silent Command (1915)
- Where Are My Children? (1916)
- Shoes (1916)
- The Double Room Mystery (1917)
- '49–'17 (1917)
- A Wife on Trial (1917)
- The Double Standard (1917)
- Wild Life (1918)
- The Grey Parasol (1918)
- Love's Prisoner (1919)
- The Follies Girl (1919)
- The Peddler of Lies (1920)
- Bubbles (1920)
- The Wolverine (1921)
- The Hunchback of Notre Dame (1923)
- Love's Whirlpool (1924)
- Another Man's Wife (1924)
- The Broken Gate (1927)
- Black Butterflies (1928)
