= Christie brothers filmography =

Below is a list of films made by Canadian motion picture entrepreneurs Charles and Alfred Christie, known as the Christie brothers. The pair made films through their Christie Film Company in the early 20th century until the Wall Street crash of 1929, after which Al made films with his own company until he left the film industry in 1941.

== Films ==
Year	Title	Director	Writer	Producer	Actor	Other	Notes
1911	Mutt and Jeff	Al	No	No	No	No	
	Wild West Weekly	Al	No	No	No	No	
1913	An Elephant on His Hands	Al	No	No	No	No	
1914	The Newlyweds' Dilemma	Al	No	No	No	No	
1914	When Ursus Threw the Bull	Al	No	No	No	No	
1914	She Was Only a Working Girl	Al	No	No	No	No	
1914	When the Girls Joined the Force	Al	No	No	No	No	
1914	Those Persistent Old Maid	Al	No	No	No	No	
1914	Their Honeymoon	Al	No	No	No	No	
1914	Sophie of the Films	Al	No	No	No	No	
1914	Great Universal Mystery	No	No	No	Al	No	
1914	A Lucky Deception	Al	Al	No	No	No	
1914	When Eddie Went to the Front	Al	No	No	No	No	
1914	When Lizzie Got Her Polish	Al	No	No	No	No	
1914	A Baby Did It	Al	No	No	No	No	
1914	Could You Blame Her?	Al	No	No	No	No	
1914	Those College Days	Al	No	No	No	No	
1914	Maggie's Honest Lover	Al	No	No	No	No	
1914	A Troublesome Wink	Al	No	No	No	No	
1915	All Aboard	Al	Al	No	No	No	
1915	Almost a King	Al	No	No	No	No	
1915	Eddie's Little Love Affair	Al	No	No	No	No	
1915	Little Egypt Malone	Al	No	No	No	No	
1915	Love and a Savage	Al	No	No	No	No	
1915	Mrs. Plum's Pudding	Al	Al	No	No	No	
1915	Wanted: A Leading Lady	Al	No	No	No	No	
1915	When the Mummy Cried for Help	Al	No	No	No	No	
1915	Jed's Little Elopement	Al	No	No	No	No	
1915	In a Jackpot	No	Al	No	No	No	
1915	When Cupid Caught a Thief	Al	No	No	No	No	
1915	Too Many Crooks	Al	Al	No	No	No	
1915	When They Were Co-Eds	Al	Al	No	No	No	
1915	When Her Idol Fell	Al	No	No	No	No	
1915	Their Friend, the Burglar	Al	No	No	No	No	
1915	Her Rustic Hero	Al	No	No	No	No	
1915	The Downfall of Potts	Al	No	No	No	No	
1915	His Egyptian Affinity	Al	No	No	No	No	
1915	Tony, the Wop	Al	No	No	No	No	
1915	Lizzie and the Beauty Contest	Al	No	No	No	No	
1915	Lost: Three Teeth	Al	No	No	No	No	
1915	The Campbells Are Coming	No	No	No	Al	No	
1915	Father's Helping Hand	No	Al	No	No	No	
1915	Where the Heather Blooms	Al	Al	No	No	No	
1915	A Looney Love Affair	No	Al	No	No	No	
1916	Never Lie to Your Wife	Al	No	No	No	No	
1916	Seminary Scandal	Al	No	No	No	No	
1916	Wanted: A Husband	Al	No	No	No	No	
1916	The Newlyweds' Mix-Up	No	Al	No	No	No	
1916	Lem's College Career	Al	Al	No	No	No	
1916	Hist! At Six O'Clock	Al	No	No	No	No	
1916	Henry's Little Kid	Al	Al	No	No	No	
1917	Five Little Widows	Al	Al	No	No	No	
1917	Who's Looney Now?	Al	No	No	No	No	
1919	Sally's Blighted Career	Al	No	No	No	No	
1920	813	Charles	No	No	No	No	
1920	Out for the Night	Al	No	No	No	No	
1920	The Reckless Sex	Al	No	No	No	No	
1920	So Long Letty	Al	No	No	No	No	
1920	Wedding Blues	Al	No	No	No	No	
1921	See My Lawyer	Al	No	No	No	No	
1921	Kiss and Make Up	Al	No	No	No	No	
1922	One Stormy Knight	Al	No	No	No	No	
1922	That Son of Sheik	Al	No	No	No	No	
1922	Fair Enough	Al	No	No	No	No	
1922	Cold Feet	Al	No	No	No	No	
1923	The Chased Bride	Al	No	No	No	No	
1924	Bright Lights	Al	No	No	No	No	
1924	Savage Love	Al	No	No	No	No	
1925	Hot Doggie	No	No	Al	No	No	
1925	Slippery Feet	No	No	Al	No	No	
1926	Fair But Foolish	Al	No	No	No	No	
1927	Meet the Folks	Al	No	No	No	No	
1927	Ocean Blues	No	No	Al	No	No	
1929	Divorce Made Easy	No	No	Al	No	No	
1930	Charley's Aunt	Al	No	Al; Charles	No	No	
1930	Don't Give Up	No	No	Al	No	No	
1930	Don't Leave Home	No	No	Al	No	No	
1930	Love Your Neighbor	No	No	Al	No	No	
1930	Our Nagging Wives	No	No	Al	No	No	
1931	The Freshman's Goat	No	No	Al	No	No	
1931	College Cuties	No	No	Al	No	No	
1931	A College Racket	No	No	Al	No	No	
1931	Come to Papa	No	No	Al	No	No	
1931	Don't Divorce Him	No	No	Al	No	No	
1931	For the Love of Fanny	No	No	Al	No	No	
1931	A Fowl Affair	No	No	Al	No	No	
1931	The Freshman's Finish	No	No	Al	No	No	
1931	The Girl Rush	No	No	Al	No	No	
1931	Girls Will Be Boys	No	No	Al	No	No	
1931	A Happy Little Honeymoon	No	No	Al	No	No	
1931	What a Head!	No	No	Al	No	No	
1932	He's a Honey	No	No	Al	No	No	
1932	Hollywood Runaround	No	No	Al	No	No	
1932	Honeymoon Beach	No	No	Al	No	No	
1932	Ship A Hooey!	No	No	Al	No	No	
1932	That Rascal	Al	No	Al	No	No	
1933	Divorce Sweets	No	No	Al	No	No	
1933	The Freeze Out	No	No	Al	No	No	
1933	Keyhole Katie	No	No	Al	No	No	
1933	Mr. Adam	No	No	Al	No	No	
1933	Static	No	No	Al	No	No	
1933	Techno-Crazy	No	No	Al	No	No	
1934	Gentlemen of the Bar	No	No	Al	No	No	
1934	The Big Meow	Al	No	Al	No	No	
1934	The Doctor	No	No	No	No	Al (Note: Supervion)	
1934	Trav'lling the Road	No	No	No	No	Al	
1934	Dog-gone Babies	No	No	Al	No	No	
1934	Domestic Bliss-ters	No	No	Al	No	No	
1934	The Girl from Paradise	No	No	Al	No	No	
1934	Going Spanish	No	No	Al	No	No	
1934	Good Luck – Best Wishes	No	No	Al	No	No	
1934	A Good Scout	No	No	Al	No	No	
1934	Hello Sailors	No	No	Al	No	No	
1934	His Lucky Day	No	No	Al	No	No	
1934	Hotel Anchovy	No	No	Al	No	No	
1934	How Am I Doing	No	No	Al	No	No	
1934	The Inventors	No	No	Al	No	No	
1934	Mountain Melody	No	No	No	No	Al	
1934	Rural Romeos	No	No	Al	No	No	
1934	Second Hand Husband	No	No	Al	No	No	
1934	She's My Lilly, I'm Her Willie	No	No	Al	No	No	
1934	Three Cheers for Love	No	No	Al	No	No	
1934	Time on Their Hands	No	No	Al	No	No	
1934	Way Down Yonder	No	No	Al	No	No	
1934	The Wrong Bottle	No	No	Al	No	No	
1935	Way Out West	No	No	Al	No	No	
1935	Seeing Nellie Home	No	No	Al	No	No	
1935	The Expectant Father	No	No	Al	No	No	
1935	All for One	No	No	Al	No	No	
1935	All for One	Al	No	No	No	No	
1935	Dame Shy	No	No	Al	No	No	
1935	Dumb Luck	No	No	Al	No	No	
1935	An Ear for Music	No	No	Al	No	No	
1935	Easy Money	No	No	Al	No	No	
1935	Easy Pickin's	No	No	Al	No	No	
1935	Fireman's Day Off	No	No	Al	No	No	
1935	Friendly Spirits	No	No	Al	No	No	
1935	Gay Old Days	No	No	Al	No	No	
1935	Grooms in Gloom	No	No	Al	No	No	
1935	Hurray for Rhythm	No	No	Al	No	No	
1935	Rhythm of Paree	No	No	Al	No	No	
1935	Kiss the Bride	No	No	Al	No	No	
1935	Ladies Love Hats	No	No	Al	No	No	
1935	Life of the Party	No	No	Al	No	No	
1935	The Light Fantastic	No	No	Al	No	No	
1935	Love in a Hurry	No	No	Al	No	No	
1935	Hillbilly Love	No	No	Al	No	No	
1935	The Magic Word	No	No	Al	No	No	
1935	Mr. Widget	No	No	Al	No	No	
1935	Moon Over Manhattan	No	No	Al	No	No	
1935	A Nose for News	No	No	Al	No	No	
1935	Object Not Matrimony	No	No	Al	No	No	
1935	The Old Camp Ground	No	No	Al	No	No	
1935	One Big Happy Family	No	No	Al	No	No	
1935	Only the Brave	No	No	Al	No	No	
1935	Penny Wise	No	No	Al	No	No	
1935	Perfect Thirty-Sixes	No	No	Al	No	No	
1935	Personality and the Pen	No	No	Al	No	No	
1935	Radio Rascals	No	No	Al	No	No	
1935	Rodeo Day	No	No	Al	No	No	
1935	The Song Plugger	No	No	Al	No	No	
1935	Stylish Stouts	No	No	Al	No	No	
1936	Spring Is Here	No	No	Al	No	No	
1936	Spooks	No	No	Al	No	No	
1936	Home on the Range	No	No	Al	No	No	
1936	College Capers	No	No	Al	No	No	
1936	Alpine Rendezvous	No	No	Al	No	No	
1936	Amuse Yourself	No	No	Al	No	No	
1936	Any Old Port	No	No	Al	No	No	
1936	Beware of Blondes	No	No	Al	No	No	
1936	Boy, Oh Boy	No	No	Al	No	No	
1936	The Chemist	No	No	Al	No	No	
1936	Fresh from the Fleet	No	No	Al	No	No	
1936	Freshies	No	No	Al	No	No	
1936	Gifts in Rhythm	No	No	Al	No	No	
1936	Giv'im Air	No	No	Al	No	No	
1936	Going Native	No	No	Al	No	No	
1936	Gold Bricks	No	No	Al	No	No	
1936	Happy Heels	No	No	Al	No	No	
1936	Mixed Policies	No	No	Al	No	No	
1936	Parked in Paree	No	No	Al	No	No	
1936	Pink Lemonade	No	No	Al	No	No	
1936	The Queen's Birthday	No	No	Al	No	No	
1936	The Ring Goes 'Round	No	No	Al	No	No	
1936	Thanks, Mr. Cupid	No	No	Al	No	No	
1936	Triple Trouble	No	No	Al	No	No	
1936	Whose Baby Are You?	No	No	Al	No	No	
1937	Bashful Ballerina	No	No	Al	No	No	
1937	The Affairs of Pierre	Al	No	No	No	No	
1937	Dime a Dance	No	No	Al	No	No	
1937	Fun's Fun	No	No	Al	No	No	
1937	Girls Ahoy	No	No	Al	No	No	
1937	Going, Going, Gone!	No	No	Al	No	No	
1937	High-C Honeymoon	No	No	Al	No	No	
1937	Hold It!	No	No	Al	No	No	
1937	How to Dance the Shag	No	No	Al	No	No	
1937	Koo Koo Korrespondance Skool	No	No	Al	No	No	
1937	Love in Arms	No	No	Al	No	No	
1937	Melody Girl	No	No	Al	No	No	
1937	Montague the Magnificent	No	No	Al	No	No	
1937	Off the Horses	No	No	Al	No	No	
1937	Playboy Number One	No	No	Al	No	No	
1937	Ready to Serve	No	No	Al	No	No	
1937	Silly Night	No	No	Al	No	No	
1937	Slacks Appeal	No	No	Al	No	No	
1937	The Smart Way	No	No	Al	No	No	
1937	Who's Who	No	No	Al	No	No	
1938	Sing for Sweetie	No	No	Al	No	No	
1938	The Birth of a Baby	Al	No	No	No	No	
1938	Air Parade	Al	No	No	No	No	
1938	Beautiful, But Dummies	No	No	Al	No	No	
1938	Cute Crime	No	No	Al	No	No	
1938	Getting an Eyeful	No	No	Al	No	No	
1938	The Miss They Missed	No	No	Al	No	No	
1938	Pardon My Accident	No	No	Al	No	No	
1938	Wanna Be a Model?	No	No	Al	No	No	
1940	Half a Sinner	Al	No	No	No	No	

== Works cited ==
- Foster, Charles (2000). Stardust and Shadows: Canadians in Early Hollywood. Dundurn Press. ISBN 1550023489.
- Mitchell, Glenn (1998). A-Z of Silent Film Comedy. Batsford Books. ISBN 0713479396.
- Bushnell, Brooks (1993). Directors and Their Films: A Comprehensive Reference, 1895-1990. McFarland & Company. ISBN 0899507662.
- Dowling, Pat (October 9, 1920). "Christie Celebrates Fourth Anniversary". Exhibitors Herald.
- Motion Pictures: 1912-1939. Library of Congress. 1951. LCCN 51-60018.
- "Film Follies". Film Follies.
