= Some Runner =

- Directed by: Al Christie
- Produced by: Nestor Film Company; David Horsley
- Starring: Eddie Lyons; Lee Moran
- Distributed by: Universal Film Manufacturing Company
- Release date: August 22, 1913
- Running time: 2 reels
- Country: USA
- Language: Silent..English titles

Some Runner is a 1913 silent film short directed by Al Christie with Eddie Lyons and Lee Moran. It was released as a split-reel with When Cupid Won.

== Cast ==
- Eddie Lyons - Marathon Runner
- Lee Moran
- Ramona Langley
