= Mingling Spirits =

- Directed by: Al Christie
- Written by: Al Christie; Robert F. McGowan
- Produced by: Nestor Film Company
- Starring: Eddie Lyons; Betty Compson
- Distributed by: Universal Film Manufacturing Company
- Release date: January 17, 1916
- Running time: 1 reel
- Country: USA
- Language: Silent...English titles

Mingling Spirits is a 1916 silent film comedy short directed by Al Christie and starring his regular stable of actors Eddie Lyons, Betty Compson and Lee Moran. It was produced by the Nestor Film Company and distributed through Universal Film Manufacturing Company.

== Cast ==
- Eddie Lyons - Mr. Newlywed
- Betty Compson - Mrs. Newlywed
- Lee Moran - Jim Smith
- Stella Adams - Mrs. Newlywed's Mother

== See also ==
- Betty Compson filmography
