= When the Heart Calls =

1912 film

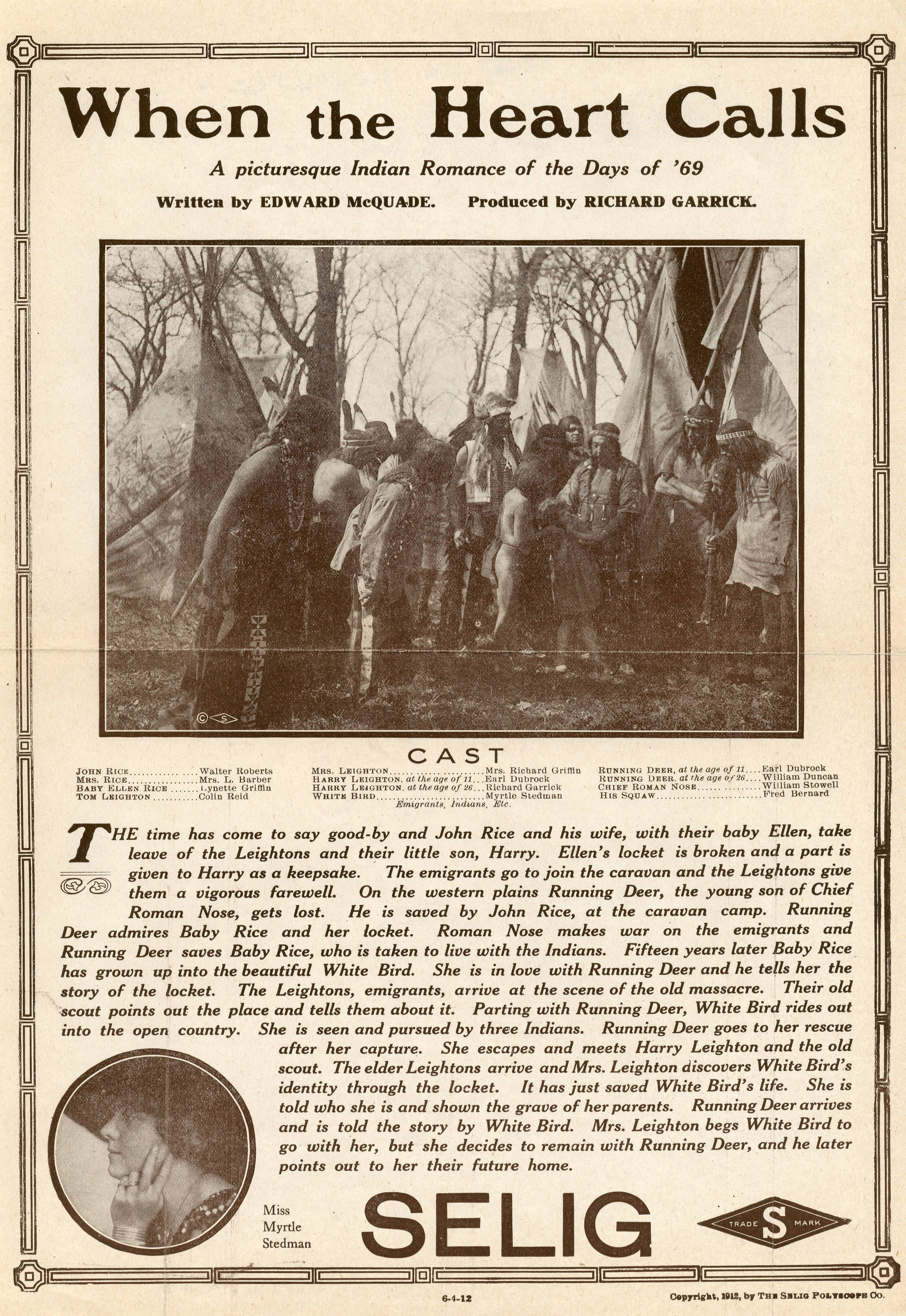
- Flier for film
- Directed by: Al Christie
- Produced by: Nestor Company
- Starring: Lee Moran; Russell Bassett; Louise Glaum
- Distributed by: Universal Film Company
- Release date: August 19, 1912
- Running time: 10 min. (1-reel)
- Country: United States
- Languages: Silent; English intertitles

When the Heart Calls is a 1912 American silent era short Western comedy film starring Lee Moran, Russell Bassett, Louise Glaum, and Victoria Forde.

Directed by Al Christie and produced by the Nestor Company, it was distributed by the Universal Film Company.

When the Heart Calls was filmed at Nestor Studios, the first studio actually located in Hollywood, which was merged with Universal in 1912. It marked Glaum's movie debut.

== Cast ==
- Lee Moran as Dick Lee, the city chap
- Russell Bassett as James Gordon, the ranchman
- Louise Glaum as Mary Gordon, the ranchman's daughter
- Victoria Forde as Lillian West, the ranchman's fiancée
- Myrtle Stedman as White Bird

== See also ==
- List of American films of 1912
