= Almost a Rescue =

1913 film

- Directed by: Al Christie
- Starring: Fatty Arbuckle
- Production company: Nestor Film Company
- Release date: August 8, 1913
- Country: United States
- Language: Silent with English intertitles

Almost a Rescue is a 1913 American silent short comedy film featuring Fatty Arbuckle.

== Synopsis ==
Students in a boarding house in New York City find themselves in financial trouble when they are not able to afford their rent.

== Cast ==
- Donald MacDonald as Hawkeye
- Roscoe "Fatty" Arbuckle as Jimmie
- Irene Hunt as May Smith
- Billie Bennett as Maud Smith
- Eddie Lyons as Kussie #1
- Lee Moran as Kussie #2
- Russell Bassett as Dr. Quack

== Production ==
The film was produced by the Nestor Film Company. Al Christie directed the film. It was released on August 8, 1913.

== See also ==
- List of American films of 1913
- Fatty Arbuckle filmography
