= Centaur Film Company =

American film company

- Formerly: Nestor Motion Picture Company (1911 — 1912)
- Type: Private
- Industry: Film
- Founded: 1907
- Founder: William Horsley; David Horsley
- Defunct: 1912
- Fate: Absorbed by Universal Pictures
- Successor: Universal Pictures
- Headquarters: Bayonne, New Jersey; Hollywood, California

The Centaur Film Company was an American motion picture production company founded in 1907 in Bayonne, New Jersey, by William and David Horsley. It was the first independent motion picture production company in the United States. In 1909 the company added a West Coast production unit, the Nestor Film Company, which established the first permanent film studio in Hollywood, California, in 1911. The company was absorbed by the Universal Film Manufacturing Company in 1912.

== History ==
The Centaur Film Company was the first independent motion picture production company in the United States. It was formed in 1907 by David Horsley, operator of a successful bicycle business and pool parlor in Bayonne, New Jersey, with his brother William Horsley and Charles Gorman, a screenwriter for the Biograph Company. The company's first production was The Cowboy's Escape, a one-reel short film released September 15, 1908. In 1910 Gorman sold his interest in the company back to the Horsleys, and William Horsley—a silent partner for Centaur's first three years—assumed an active role running the company's laboratory.

Cinematographer Charles Rosher, who went to work for Centaur in 1909 recalled, "Well, I won't call it a studio. It was really nothing but a shop, with a lot of bathtubs for developing the film. They used to go out and make pictures with an improvised camera—an infringement of the Motion Picture Patents Company. This brought the Horsleys into the patents war, and they became the first independent producers."

Actors working for Centaur included Francis Ford, who joined the company around 1908 and inspired his younger brother John Ford to also enter the film industry. Motion picture industry pioneer Al Christie began his filmmaking career at Centaur in 1909.

By 1910, the operation was producing three movies a week, including the Mutt and Jeff comedies.

=== West Coast unit ===
"However, weather conditions on the east coast made filming an uncertain proposition because camera technology at the time relied on sunshine."

"Frustrated, and realizing that California afforded the opportunity to make films year round, David Horsley moved his operations to the west coast."

=== Nestor Motion Picture Company ===
Centaur changed its name to Nestor Motion Picture Company after its West Coast production unit, and in the fall of 1911 it opened the first motion picture studio in Hollywood, in the Blondeau Tavern building at the corner of Sunset Boulevard and Gower Street. With Horsley was Al Christie, who served as general manager in charge of Christie Comedies, plus Charles Rosher, who lent his expertise as the studio's full-time cameraman.

=== Merger with Universal Pictures ===
In 1912 the Horsley Brothers, along with other independents, notably Carl Laemmle and his Independent Motion Picture Company, known as IMP, and Swanson and Ed Porter founded Universal Picture Company, succeeded in defeating the monopolistic hold on the industry of the Patents Company and General Film Company, in what was known at the time as the Latham Loop controversy.

Nestor Studio and Nestor Ranch ranch location were renamed by Carl Laemmle, becoming Universal Studios and the Universal Ranch (First Universal City) - see "Forest Lawn Hollywood Hills Film History"

Nestor Studios name appeared on 844 films, from The Blazed Trail (1910) to Ain't Nature Wonderful? (1920)

In 1913 David Horsley sold his Universal shares and started David Horsley Productions, producing 17 films from 1915 to 1919, released by different film distributors (Mutual Film from 1915 — 1916, & Triangle Distributing Corporation from 1916 — 1919).

By 1915 Universal completed the move of its operations (Nestor/ Universal ranch and studio) to the new Universal City (Lankershim), The Sunset Boulevard and Gower Street studio continued as the production location for Nestor Comedies ( Nestor production unit). In 1916 the Oak Crest/Nestor/Universal ranch is leased by Lasky. The Lasky/Famous Players/Paramount Ranch remained as filming location until 1926.

== William Horsley Film Laboratory ==
In 1916 William Horsley withdrew from the Universal company and set up the William Horsley Film Laboratory, later known as Hollywood Film Laboratory, later known as Hollywood Film Enterprises, Inc., devoted exclusively to the developing and printing of 35mm films, later known as Hollywood Digital Laboratory.

From the 1930s to the 1960s, Hollywood Film Enterprises (under the name “Cine Art Films”) diversified its activities into the 16mm and 8mm "home movie" market. During those years, they were the exclusive distributor of Walt Disney's Silly Symphony & Mickey Mouse cartoons in 8mm and 16mm for home movie and "toy" projectors. HFE also at various times offered Walter Lantz and Hugh Harman-Rudolf Ising cartoons as well; along with home movie reels of Laurel and Hardy, Gene Autry, Roy Rogers, Charlie Chaplin, and various Hal Roach and Al Christie comedies, and a Tarzan series edited from a silent era serial. They left the home movie business in the 1960s when Disney withdrew their license and started their own home movie division. The company was later known as Hollywood Film and Video, Inc.

== David Horsley Productions ==
William was David's silent partner in "David Horsley Productions" (1916 to 1919) 17 films between 1916 and 1919 listed in the Internet Movie Data base (IMDb) and possibly the 55 films (1916 to 1919) released using "The Centaur Film Company" Name. "Centaur Film Company", as a film studio appears to have existed in Bayonne, New Jersey, until the opening of Nestor Studios Hollywood in 1912. The name used again (1916 to 1919, by David Horsley after he sold his shares in Universal Pictures.

== The Centaur Film Company Name ==
The "Centaur Film Company" name appears on 55 films (from 1915 to 1919) - Pictures released by different film distributors (Mutual Film from 1915 — 1916, & Triangle Distributing Corporation from 1916 — 1919)

The "Nestor Film Company" name appears on 184 films (from 1910 to 1920) - Pictures released by Universal Film Manufacturing Company: Santa Monica Road Race (1912)

The "Nestor Film Company" was used as the name of Universal Studios Production units in over 660 productions - Universal Film Manufacturing Company (1912 — 1920)

== Filmography ==
- Stanley in Darkest Africa, part of the Stanley the African Explorer series
- The Jungle Outcasts
- A Kaffir's Gratitude
- A Siren of the Jungle
- The Rajaks Sacrifice
