= Jed's Trip to the Fair =

1916 film

- Directed by: Al Christie
- Written by: Al Christie
- Produced by: Nestor Film Company
- Starring: Eddie Lyons
- Distributed by: Universal Film Manufacturing Company
- Release date: January 3, 1916
- Running time: One reel
- Country: USA
- Language: Silent with English titles

Jed's Trip to the Fair is a 1916 silent film comedy directed by Al Christie and starring Eddie Lyons, Lee Moran and Betty Compson. It was produced by Nestor Film Company and released through Universal Film Manufacturing Company.

== Cast ==
- Eddie Lyons - Jed
- Lee Moran - Mysterious Stranger
- Betty Compson - Lizzie
- Joe Janecke - Thief
- Ethel Lynne

== See also ==
- Betty Compson filmography
