= The Smell of the Yukon =

- Directed by: Lee Moran; Eddie Lyons
- Written by: J. Alexander Grubb; Thomas J. Geraghty
- Starring: Lee Moran; Eddie Lyons
- Production company: Universal Film
- Distributed by: Universal Film
- Release date: March 24, 1919
- Running time: 1 reel
- Country: USA
- Language: Silent (English intertitles)

The Smell of the Yukon is a 1919 American silent short comedy film directed by and starring Lee Moran and Eddie Lyons. It is a burlesque on The Shooting of Dan McGrew. The film was both produced and distributed by Universal Film, and released under the Star Comedy banner.

== Plot ==
According to the copyright description, "Lee owns an Alaskan dance hall and barroom. He is a hard character, who shoots several men each morning for exercise. He is in love with Mildred, a dancer of the place. Eddie, a worn-out miner, tired with along tramp arrives. He is a musical man. He plays the piano under the threat of death from Lee if he stops. Lee and the girl dance as Eddie plays. Eddie weakens and is revived with his Honolulu Bitters, a drink of his own which possesses a wallop of great powers. Eddie then plays a ukelele, which brings back memories to Lee. He once visited Honolulu, where he discovered a fair dancer much like the girl he now dances with. She was in love with a ukelele player much like Eddie. Lee, a desperate character, kills the ukelele player and runs away with the girl. This haunts him and when he hears Eddie playing the ukelele he gets in a violent temper, starting a fight with Eddie. Eddie tells Lee that he, Eddie, is the Hawaiian player he supposedly killed. He then pulls out a gun and the lights go out. In the dark they battle, Eddie shooting Lee many times. The lights go on and Lee is on the floor. Eddie gives Lee a drink of Honolulu Bitters and it revives Lee, making him as good as new. Eddie then starts selling Honolulu Bitters, proving to be a traveling agent for the same. He sells out and the dance hall rocks with the wild dance of the bitters."

== Cast ==
- Lee Moran as Hully Balloo
- Eddie Lyons as Ukelele Ike
- Mildred Moore as Sue

== Censorship ==
The Smell of the Yukon film was rejected in its entirety by the Kansas Board of Review, with no reason given.
