= Wanted: A Leading Lady =

1915 film by Al Christie

- Directed by: Al Christie
- Produced by: Nestor Film Company
- Starring: Eddie Lyons; Betty Compson
- Distributed by: Universal Film Manufacturing Company
- Release date: November 19, 1915
- Running time: 1 reel
- Country: United States
- Language: Silent..English titles

Wanted: A Leading Lady is a 1915 silent short comedy directed by Al Christie. It stars Eddie Lyons, Lee Moran and Betty Compson in her film debut.

== Cast ==
- Eddie Lyons - Eddie
- Lee Moran - Lee
- Betty Compson - The Leading Lady
- George B. French - The Director
- Gus Alexander - Gus
- Ethel Lynne
- Ray Gallagher
- Billie Rhodes
- Harry Rattenberry
- Stella Adams

== See also ==
- Betty Compson filmography
