= Stella Adams =

American actress

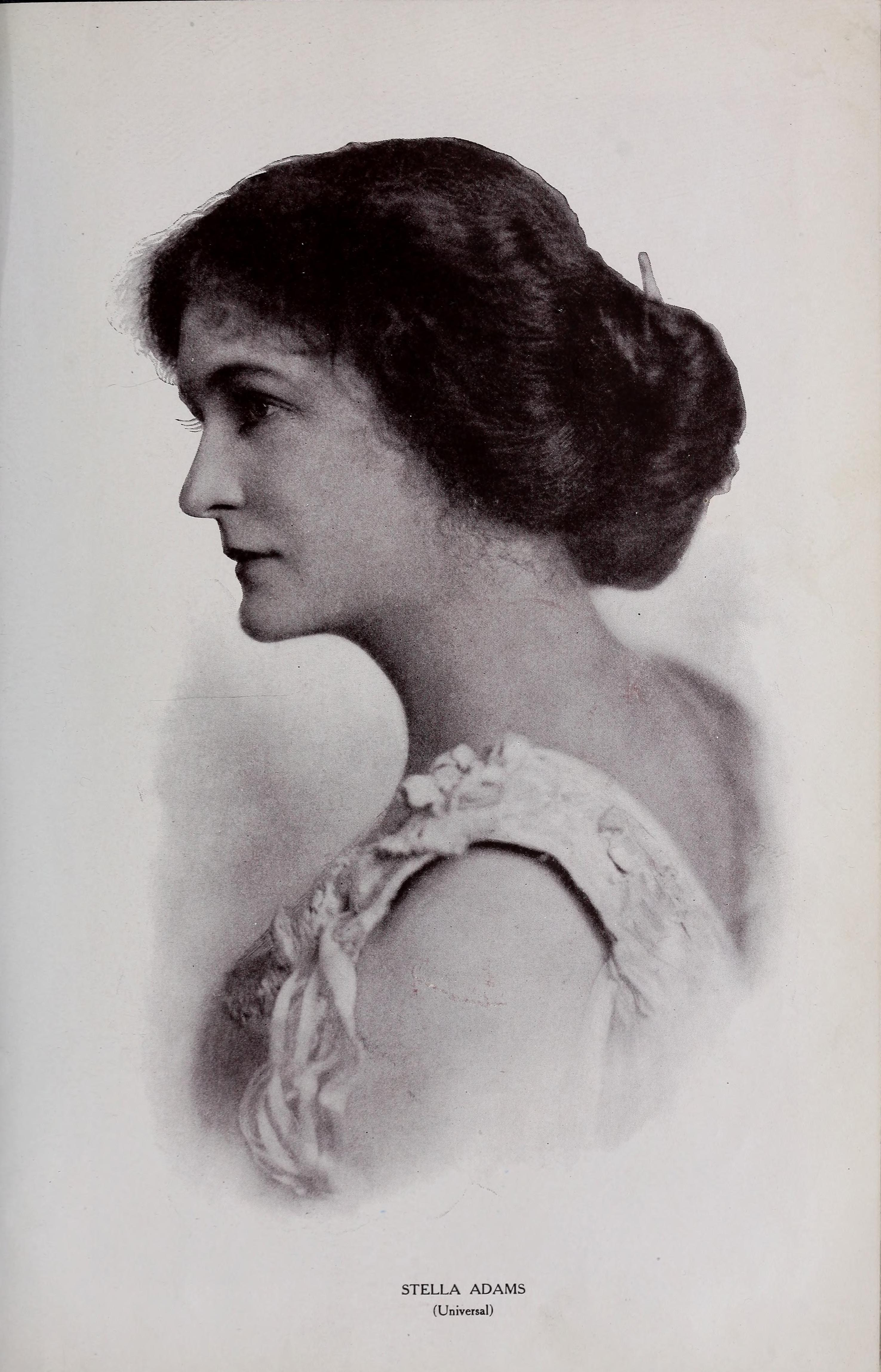
- Stella Adams (from Motion Picture Magazine, January 1915)
- Born: April 24, 1883; Sherman, Texas, U.S.
- Died: September 17, 1961 (aged 78); Hollywood, California, U.S.
- Occupation: Actress
- Years active: 1909–1936
- Spouse: James Whittendale

Stella Adams (April 24, 1883 – September 17, 1961) was an American actress. Born in Sherman, Texas, she moved to Oakland, California in her childhood and was educated in schools in that city. She made her stage debut at the Tivoli Theatre in San Francisco in 1899 and had an active career with American stock theatre companies until 1912. During that period she appeared in the chorus of two Broadway musicals in New York, and also portrayed the role of Javotte in the original Broadway production of Alfred Baldwin Sloane and Sydney Rosenfeld's comic opera The Mocking Bird in 1902-1903. While working in stock theatre in Los Angeles she was cast in her first leading role in a film, starring in In the Sultan's Power (1909). She continued to work as a stage actress in her home state of California until joining the Nestor Film Company in 1912. She made more than a 100 short silent films over the five year period, and also some feature length pictures. After her marriage in 1917 she stopped performing for the next nine year, but resumed performing in pictures from 1926 until her retirement in 1936. In her later career she appeared in sound films.

== Early years ==
The daughter of Thomas Adams and Mary E. Carr (later Mary Flynn), Stella A. Adams was born in Sherman, Texas on April 24, 1883. By 1895 she was residing in Oakland, California where she was a student at the Franklin School. In Oakland she gave several artistic recitations at local events sponsored by the Baptist Church in her growing up years. She also sang in the choir of 10th Avenue Baptist Church; then the largest volunteer chorus in the city.

== Early career ==
Adams made her professional debut as an actress in 1899 at the Tivoli Theatre in San Francisco, California. In 1900 she was performing in Salt Lake City, Utah. prior to appearing at the Burbank Theatre in Los Angeles where she portrayed Dora La Farge in Mary F. Stone's A Social Highwayman in March of that year. In May 1900 she performed with John Drew Jr.'s theatre company at the Columbia Theatre in San Francisco in C. Haddon Chambers's The Tyranny of Tears. In December 1900 she made her Broadway debut at the Victoria Theatre in the chorus of John Golden's musical Miss Prinnt. She next performed as Mrs Clasher in Charles E. Blaney and Max Hoffman's new musical A Railroad Ticket which opened at the Bijou Theatre in Richmond, Virginia in May 1901. Later that year she appeared at the New Gillis Theatre in Kansas City, Missouri as Belle Macy in Charles A. Taylor's The King of the Opium Ring.

In 1902 Adams created the role of Javotte in the original production of Alfred Baldwin Sloane and Sydney Rosenfeld's comic opera The Mocking Bird; regarded as Sloane's greatest achievement as a composer. It had a successful runs at Broadway's Bijou Theatre in 1902 and again 1903, and also played at the Grand Opera House in Manhattan in the intermittent period. She returned to Broadway in 1904 in the ensemble of The Rogers Brother in Paris.

In 1906 Adams performed in stock theatre in Los Angeles; starring in Jack Golden's A Disturbed Hpneymoon. In 1907 she performed in James P. Lee's play The Baby at People's Theatre in Los Angeles. She appeared in stock theatre with the Howard Dorsett company prior to appearing at the Majestic Theatre in Chico, California in the 1908-1909 season. After this she performed as the leading actress with Ed Redmond's stock company in California theaters.

Adam's first film acting credit was in 1909's In the Sultan's Power, (Note: A 1934 newspaper article gives the film's name as Power of the Sultan.) in which she had a starring role. Filmed in a vacant lot behind a Chinese laundry in Los Angeles, the movie was remarkable because it was the first film shot entirely on the west coast of the United States. At this point in the film industry, most films were still shot in New Jersey and New York. Adams would not appear in another film for three more years. In 1910 she performed as the leading actress of the Girton Stock Company in California theaters, and starred in the musical Zip Zap Zoo at the Princess Theatre in Los Angeles. In 1911 she starred as Eugenie in the musical The Triflers at the Bentley Grand Theatre in Long Beach, California, and performed with the Adolphus Comedy Stock Company in Los Angeles.

== Later career in film ==
In 1912 Adams returned to film making in earnest when she joined the Nestor Film Company of California. Although she appeared in only 12 feature films, she acted in more than 100 short films during the silent film era, mostly in starring or featured roles. The majority of her film output was made between 1912-1917. Her early work was in comedies, but she also appeared in several Westerns. She left Nestor with director Al Christie when he began his own studio.

In 1917 Adams married press agent James Whittendale, and an article in the trade publication Billboard reported that she left California "to join her husband in Chicago, and will next year return to the legitimate stage." Nine years passed before Adams resumed her film career in 1926. In 1928 she appeared in a featured role in the silent/sound film, Me, Gangster, directed by Raoul Walsh. Over the next eight years, Adams made another ten films, retiring in 1936.

== Death ==
Adams died in Woodland Hills, California, on September 17, 1961.

== Selected filmography (shorts & featured films) ==
(Per AFI database)

- In the Sultan's Power (1909)
- Could You Blame Her (1914)
- When Bess Got in Wrong (1914) as Stella
- His Nobs the Duke (1915)
- Wanted: A Leading Lady (1915)
- Where the Heather Blooms (1915)
- Love and a Savage (1915)
- Mingling Spirits (1916)
- Me, Gangster (1928)
- Sister to Judas (1932)
- Temptation's Workshop (1932)
- The Vampire Bat (1933)
- Bachelor Mother (1933)
- Sing Sinner Sing (1933)
- The Whirlwind (1933)
- Whom the Gods Destroy (1934)
- The Tonto Kid (1935)
- The King Steps Out (1936)
- Theodora Goes Wild (1936)

== Notes and references ==
=== Bibliography ===
- Dietz, Dan (2022). The Complete Book of 1900s Broadway Musicals. Rowman & Littlefield Publishers. ISBN 9781538168943.
- Doyle, Billy H. (1999). "Stella, Adams". The Ultimate Directory of Silent and Sound Era Performers: A Necrology of Actors and Actresses. Bloomsbury Academic. ISBN 9780810835474.
- Lowe, Denise (2014). "Adams, Stella". An Encyclopedic Dictionary of Women in Early American Films: 1895-1930. Routledge. ISBN 9781317718963.
