= Their Quiet Honeymoon =

- Directed by: Al Christie
- Written by: Al Christie
- Produced by: Nestor Film Company
- Starring: Eddie Lyons; Lee Moran; Betty Compson
- Distributed by: Universal Film Manufacturing Company
- Release date: December 6, 1915
- Running time: 1 reel
- Country: USA
- Language: Silent..English

Their Quiet Honeymoon is a 1915 silent film short directed by Al Christie. It starred Eddie Lyons, Lee Moran, and Betty Compson. It was produced by the Nestor Film Company and distribute through Universal Film Manufacturing Company.

== Cast ==
- Eddie Lyons - Eddie
- Betty Compson - Betty
- Lee Moran - Lee
- Jane Waller - Jane

== See also ==
- Betty Compson filmography
