= Ramona Langley =

American actress (1893–1983)

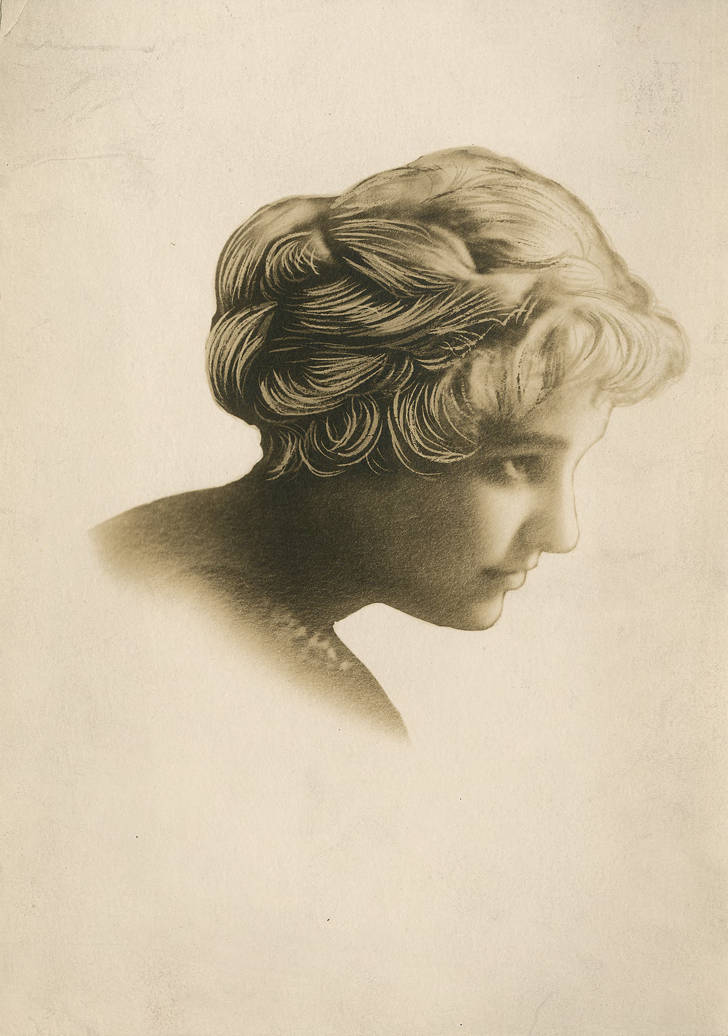
- Born: July 9, 1893; Los Angeles, California, US
- Died: November 11, 1983 (aged 90); Los Angeles, California, US
- Occupation: Actress
- Spouse(s): Clarence English (m. 1913; div. 1938); Clare Woolwine (m. 1938–his death)

Ramona Langley (July 9, 1893 – November 11, 1983) was an American film actress who was active in Hollywood during the silent era. She was known primarily for her work in comedies for Universal and Nestor.

== Biography ==
A native of Los Angeles, Ramona was born in 1893 to John Langley and Mary Niles. She would later tell reporters she was named after Helen Hunt Jackson's novel Ramona.

In 1913, the same year she began appearing in one-reel films for the Nestor Comedy Company, she married industrialist Clarence English, and the pair relocated to a large ranch near Chihuahua, Mexico. Less than a year later, the pair evacuated their home and returned to Hollywood as a result of the Mexican Border War.

Ramona was severely injured in 1914 on the set of the Universal Pictures film, She Was Only a Working Girl, after she and her male co-stars fell on a slippery concrete floor. Crushed under the weight of the men, Ramona suffered major internal injuries and was reportedly urged by director Al Christie to continue the shoot. Despite lingering injuries that kept her in a sanatorium bed for months, the studio refused to compensate her for her suffering, and she was replaced in the finished film by Victoria Forde.

After her recovery, she retired from filmmaking and focused on raising her three children. Eventually, in 1938, she and English separated. That same year, Langley married her second husband, politician Clare Woolwine, in Lake Tahoe. Woolwine died a year later after suffering a heart attack.

Ramona died on November 11, 1983, in Los Angeles.

== Select filmography ==
- Scooped by a Hencoop (1914)
- His Royal Pants (1914)
- Twixt Love and Flour (1914)
- When Billy Proposed (1914)
- Snobbery (1914)
- Cupid's Close Shave (1914)
- When Ursus Threw the Bull (1914)
- And the Villain Still Pursued Her (1914)
- A Tale of the West (1914)
- Teaching Dad a Lesson (1913)
- A Woman's Way (1913)
- Her Friend, the Butler (1913)
- Locked Out at Twelve (1913)
- When He Lost to Win (1913)
- An Elephant on His Hands (1913)
- The Golden Princess Mine (1913)
- Love, Luck and a Paint Brush (1913)
- His Wife's Burglar (1913)
- Western Hearts (1913)
- Curses! Said the Villain (1913)
- A Man of the People (1913)
- What the Wild Waves Did (1913)
- Under Western Skies (1913)
- Their Two Kids (1913)
- His Crazy Job (1913)
- The Battle of Bull Con (1913)
- The Girl Ranchers (1913)
- Won by a Skirt (1913)
- The Trail of the Serpent (1913)
- Cupid's Bad Aim (1913)
- Weighed in the Balance (1913)
- Some Runner (1913)
- Hawkeye to the Rescue (1913)
- The Pretender (1913)
