= When Bess Got in Wrong =

1914 film by Al Christie

- Directed by: Al Christie
- Written by: Bess Meredyth
- Produced by: Nestor Film Company
- Starring: Lee Moran
- Distributed by: Universal Film Manufacturing Company
- Release date: October 30, 1914 (U.S.)
- Running time: 1 reel
- Country: United States
- Language: Silent..English titles

When Bess Got in Wrong is a 1914 Canadian comedy short silent black and white film directed by Al Christie and starring Lee Moran, and Stella Adams. It is written by Bess Meredyth.

== Cast ==
- Bess Meredyth as Bess
- Lee Moran as Lee
- Stella Adams as Stella
