= Some Chaperone =

1915 film

- Directed by: Al Christie
- Written by: Al Christie
- Produced by: Al Christie; Nestor Film Company
- Starring: Harry Rattenberry; Betty Compson
- Distributed by: Universal Film Manufacturing Company
- Release date: December 27, 1915
- Running time: 1 reel
- Country: USA
- Language: Silent..English

Some Chaperone is a 1915 silent film comedy short produced and directed by Al Christie. It was produced by Christie along with the Nestor Film Company. It starred Betty Compson and Harry Rattenberry. Universal Film Manufacturing Company distributed.

== Cast ==
- Harry Rattenberry - Old Man
- Betty Compson - Betty, 1st Daughter
- Ethel Lynne - Ethel, 2nd Daughter
- Eddie Lyons - Eddie, The Secretary
- Lee Moran - Lee, The Chaperone

== See also ==
- Betty Compson filmography
