= Where the Heather Blooms =

1915 film

- Directed by: Al Christie
- Written by: Al Christie
- Starring: Eddie Lyons; Betty Compson
- Distributed by: Universal Film Manufacturing Company
- Release date: December 17, 1915
- Running time: short; 1 reel
- Country: USA
- Language: Silent..English titles

Where the Heather Blooms is a 1915 silent film comedy short directed by Al Christie. It was produced by Nestor Film Company and released through Universal Film Manufacturing Company.

== Cast ==
- Eddie Lyons - Gordon McKay
- Betty Compson - Lady Mary
- Lee Moran - First Lord Chamberlain
- Harry Rattenberry - Royal Butler
- Gus Alexander - Captain of the Guard
- Stella Adams - Mary's Mother

== See also ==
- Betty Compson filmography
