= La La Lucille (film) =

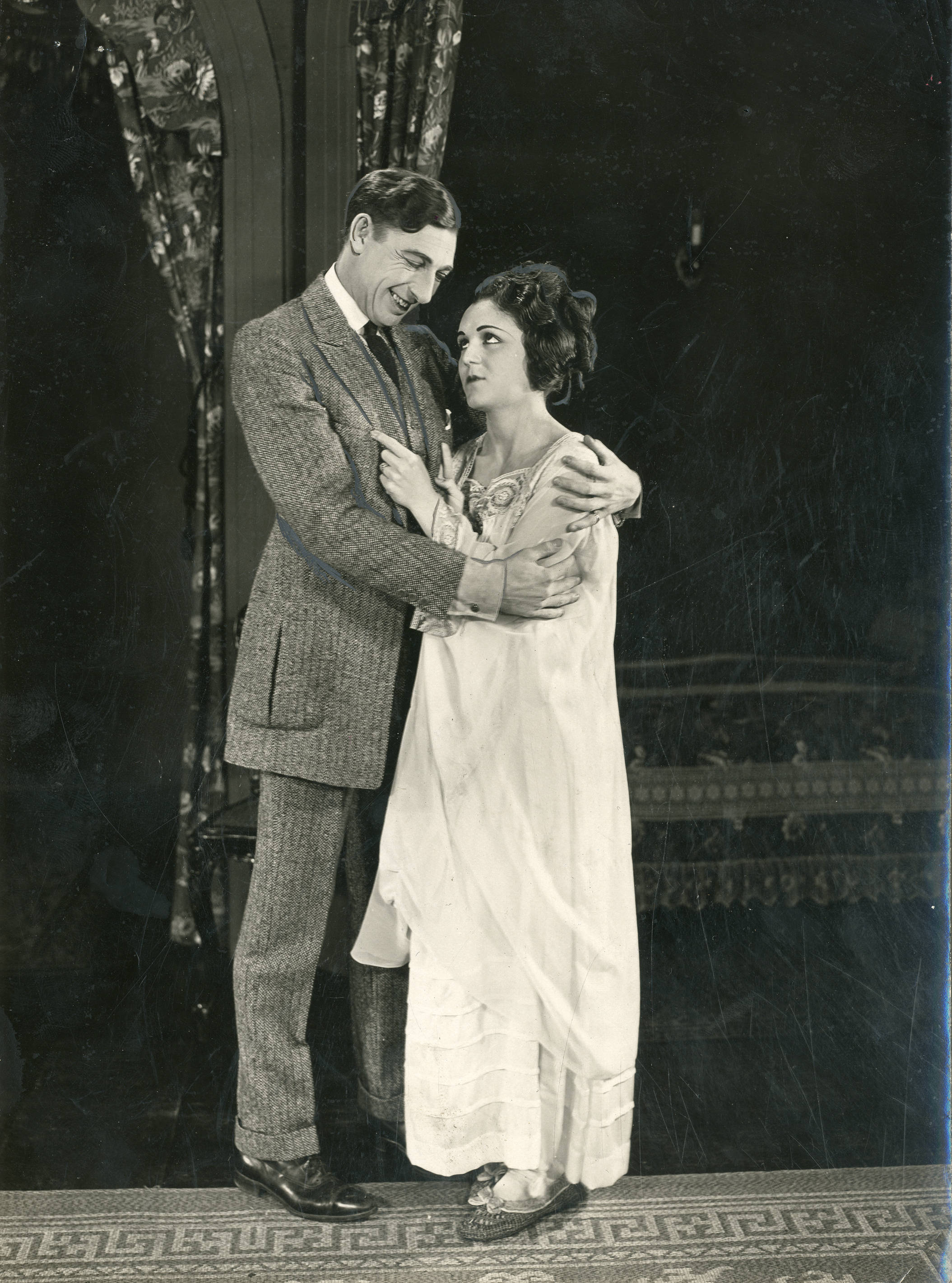
- Still of Eddie Lyons and Gladys Walton
- Directed by: Eddie Lyons; Lee Moran
- Screenplay by: Philip Hurn
- Based on: La La Lucille by Fred Jackson and George Gershwin
- Produced by: Carl Laemmle
- Starring: Eddie Lyons; Lee Moran; Gladys Walton
- Cinematography: Alfred Gosden
- Production company: Universal Film Manufacturing Co.
- Distributed by: Universal Film Manufacturing Co.
- Release date: July 19, 1920
- Running time: 5 reels
- Country: United States
- Language: English

La La Lucille is a 1920 American silent comedy film directed by and starring Eddy Lyons and Lee Moran. The film was adapted from a musical-comedy play of the same name by Fred Jackson, George Gershwin, and Arthur Jackson. It was produced and distributed by Universal.

== Cast ==
- Eddie Lyons as John Smith
- Anne Cornwall as Lucille Smith
- Lee Moran as Britton Hughes
- Gladys Walton as Peggy Hughes
- Fred Gamble as Colonel Marion
- Henry Meyer as Grimsby
- Frank Earle as Blackwood
- Charles McHugh as Brady
- Rosa Gore as Mrs. Brady
- Arthur Thalasso as Janitor
- Dorothea Wolbert as Fannie, the Janitor’s Wife
- Sam Appel as Duffy
- Burton Halbert as Jaynes
- Marian Skinner as John’s Aunt

== Preservation ==
La La Lucille is currently presumed lost. In February of 2021, the film was cited by the National Film Preservation Board on their Lost U.S. Silent Feature Films list.
