= When Lizzie Got Her Polish =

- Directed by: Al Christie
- Story by: Bess Meredyth
- Production company: Nestor Film Company
- Distributed by: Universal Film Manufacturing Company
- Release date: December 4, 1914 (U.S.)
- Country: Canada

When Lizzie Got Her Polish is a 1914 Canadian comedy short silent black and white film directed by Al Christie and produced by Nestor Film Company. It is based on the story by Bess Meredyth.

== Cast ==
- Victoria Forde as Lizzie
- Eddie Lyons as Jim
- Bess Meredyth as Bess
- Lee Moran as Lee Moran
