= Love and a Savage =

1915 film

- Directed by: Al Christie
- Written by: Al Christie
- Produced by: Nestor Film Company
- Starring: Betty Compson
- Distributed by: Universal Film Manufacturing Company
- Release date: December 20, 1915
- Running time: 1 reel
- Country: USA
- Language: Silent..English titles

Love and a Savage is a 1915 silent film comedy written and directed by Al Christie and starring Betty Compson. It was produced by the Nestor Film Company and released through Universal Film Manufacturing Company.

== Cast ==
- Betty Compson - Betty
- Stella Adams - Betty's Mother
- Harry Rattenberry - Betty's Father
- Eddie Lyons - Eddie
- Lee Moran - Lee
- Gus Alexander - The Chef
- Jane Waller - The Maid
- Ethel Lynne - The Other Girl
- Harry Lyons

== See also ==
- Betty Compson filmography
