= Ethel Lynne =

American actress (1895–1943)

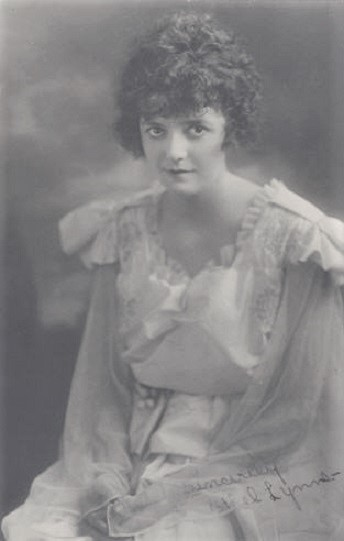
- Born: Ethel May Lindsey; February 25, 1897; Fort Worth, Texas, US
- Died: July 31, 1976 (aged 79); Los Angeles, California, US
- Occupation: Actress
- Spouse: Fred Fishback

Ethel Lynne (born Ethel Lindsey; February 25, 1897 – July 31, 1976) was an American actress who was active during Hollywood's silent era. She was married to director Fred Fishback, an associate of Fatty Arbuckle.

== Biography ==
Lynne was born in Fort Worth, Texas, to Frank Lindsey and Mary Elizabeth Chiles. She began acting as a teenager around 1915, appearing in a number of Al Christie comedies. She studied for law at New York University. She met and married director Fred Fishback in 1919. After Fishback's untimely death, she married a fellow Texan, Thomas Palmer; that marriage ended in divorce. Little is known of her life after the 1920s. She died on July 31, 1976.

== Selected filmography ==
- Some Chaperone (1915)
- Love and a Savage (1915)
- Wanted: A Leading Lady (1915)
- His Wedding Night (1916)
- By the Sad Sea Waves (1916)
- Jed's Trip to the Fair (1916)
- Help! Help! Police! (1917)
- Sauce for the Goose (1917)
- Bride and Gloom (1917)
- The Biggest Show on Earth (1918)
- Ever Since Eve (1921)
