= Ever Since Eve =

Ever Since Eve may refer to:

- Ever Since Eve (1921 film), an American silent drama film starring Shirley Mason, Herbert Heyes and Eva Gordon
- Ever Since Eve (1934 film), an American drama film
- Ever Since Eve (1937 film), an American romantic comedy film starring Marion Davies and Robert Montgomery
