= La La Lucille =

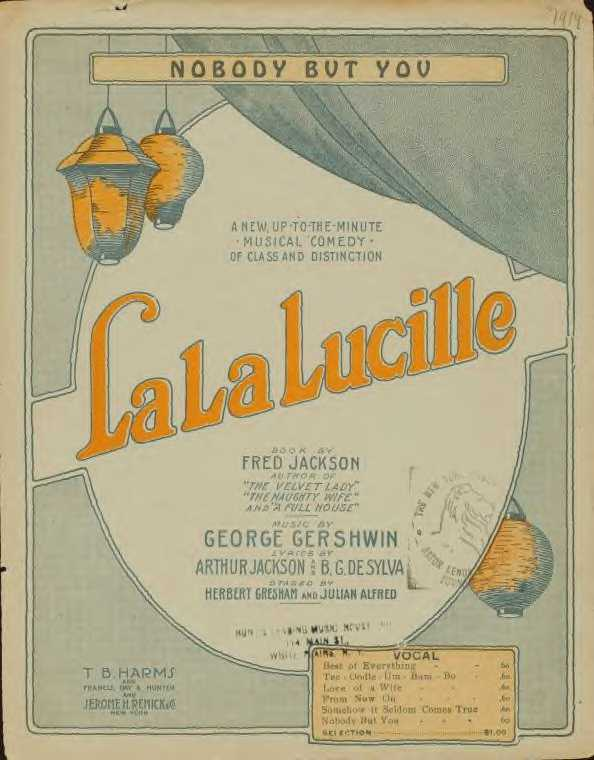
- Sheet music from the production
- Music: George Gershwin
- Lyrics: Arthur J. Jackson; Buddy DeSylva; Lou Paley; Irving Caesar
- Book: Fred Jackson
- Productions: 1919 Broadway

La La Lucille is a musical with a book by Fred Jackson, primary lyrics by Arthur J. Jackson (1893–1922) and Buddy DeSylva, additional lyrics by Lou Paley and Irving Caesar, and music by George Gershwin.

== Plot overview ==
Setting: Between the hours of 5 P.M. and 2 A.M. in New York City

The plot involves a wealthy society matron who leaves her considerable fortune to her nephew, John Smith, on condition he divorce his wife, a former vaudeville entertainer named Lucille. In order to collect his legacy, he decides to comply with the terms and then remarry her after he receives the money. Since divorces are granted only for adultery, he arranges to be found with a woman who is not his wife. Comic complications ensue when he arrives at the property, at which more than three dozen other "John Smiths" are registered as well.

== Production ==
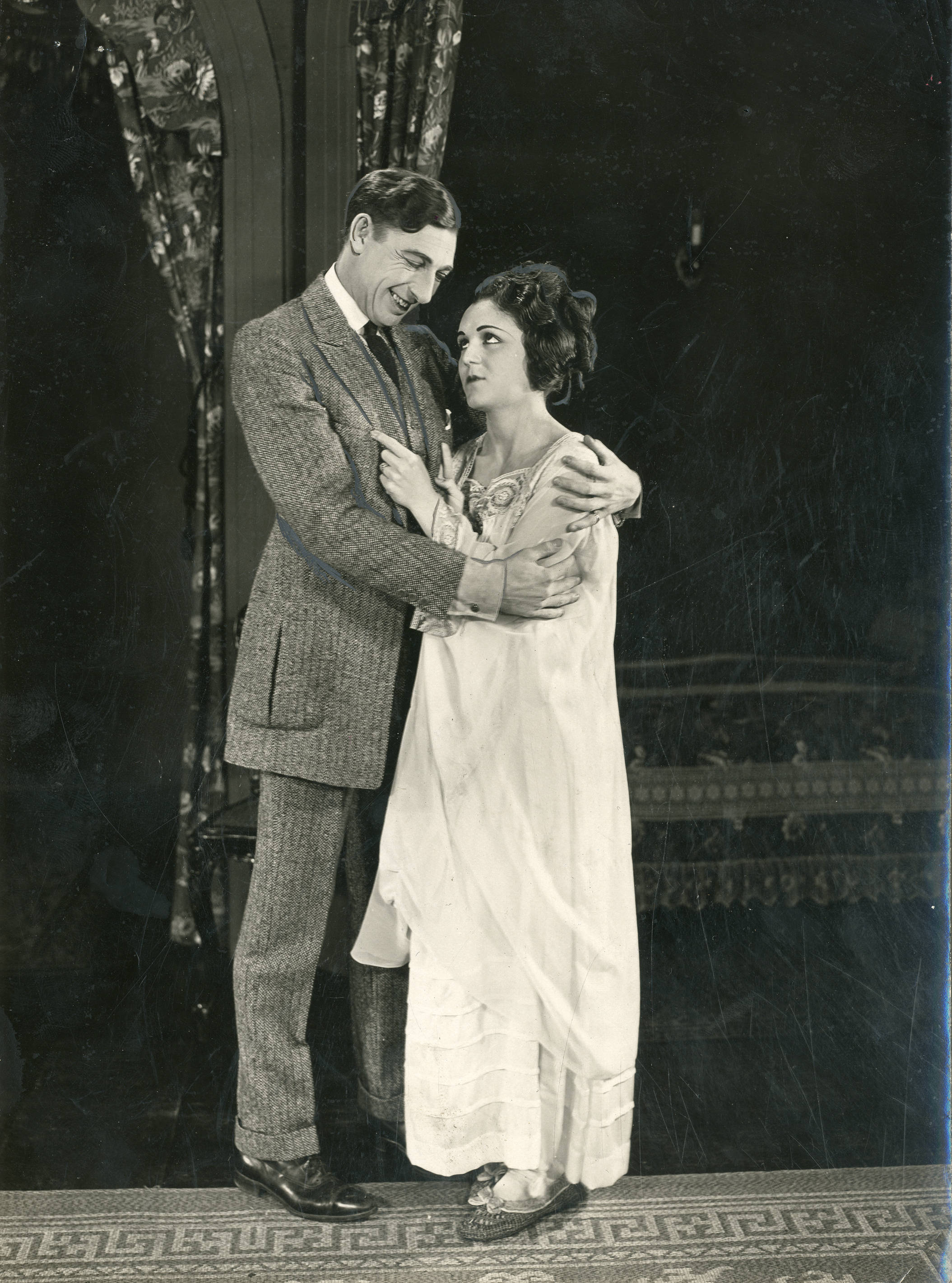
Eddie Lyons and Gladys Walton in Universal Pictures' 1920 film adaptation of La La Lucille

The musical was produced by Alfred E. Aarons, assisted by his son Alex A. Aarons. It opened on Broadway at Henry Miller's Theatre on May 26, 1919, but had to suspend performances when Actors' Equity went on strike on August 19. After the dispute was settled, it reopened at the Criterion Theatre on September 8 and remained there until October 11, 1919 closing after 104 performances. The director was Herbert Gresham, with choreography by Julian Alfred. The cast included Janet Velie as Lucille, Maurice Cass, Eleanor Daniels, John Hazzard, Lorin Raker, Marjorie Bentley, Helen Clarke, Alfred Hall, J. Clarence Harvey, and Cordelia MacDonald.

This was the "first complete book musical score" that Gershwin wrote. The production toured — with original cast members for some time — in 1920–21, all the way to the west coast. The film was shown in Canada as well. Among several later "stock" performances outside of New York was a Massachusetts staging in 1926.

In 2019, the Third Avenue Playhouse in Sturgeon Bay, Wisconsin adapted and reproduced the musical. The Playhouse's co-artistic director, James Valcq, spent years researching and reassembling the original songs and book in order to recreate the original musical as faithfully as possible.

In August 2023, University of Michigan researcher Jacob Kerzner, Associate Editor for the George and Ira Gershwin Critical Edition, found a box of "La la Lucille" orchestrations in the Samuel French Collection at Amherst College. It includes instrumental parts for flute, clarinet, two trumpets, trombone, percussion, piano, two violins, cello, and contrabass, and is presumed to be the show's touring orchestration (smaller than the Broadway complement), perhaps reduced from the original orchestrations by Frank Saddler. The score is to eventually be released as a scholarly edition prepared for the Gershwin Initiative, connected to the University of Michigan School of Music, Theatre & Dance.

== Song list ==
Act I

- Kindly Pay Us
- When You Live in a Furnished Flat
- The Best of Everything
- It's Hard to Tell
- From Now On
- Tee-Oodle-Um-Bum-Bo

Act II

- Hotel Life
- It's Great To Be in Love

Act 3

- Kisses (There's More to a Kiss than the Sound) (lyrics by Irving Caesar)
- Somehow It Seldom Comes True
- Tee-Oodle-Um-Bum-Bo (Reprise)
- The Ten Commandments of Love
- Nobody But You

Dropped songs

- (Oo, How) I Love to Be Loved by You (lyrics by Lou Paley; dropped early in Broadway run and replaced by "Nobody But You"; later used in Ed Wynn's Carnival, 1920)
- Money, Money, Money (dropped early in Broadway run and replaced by "It's Hard to Tell"; no lyric extant)
- The Love of a Wife (dropped in tryouts)
- Kitchenette (dropped in tryouts, lyrics by Buddy DeSylva and Ira Gershwin)
