= The Poor Simp =

1920 film directed by Victor Heerman

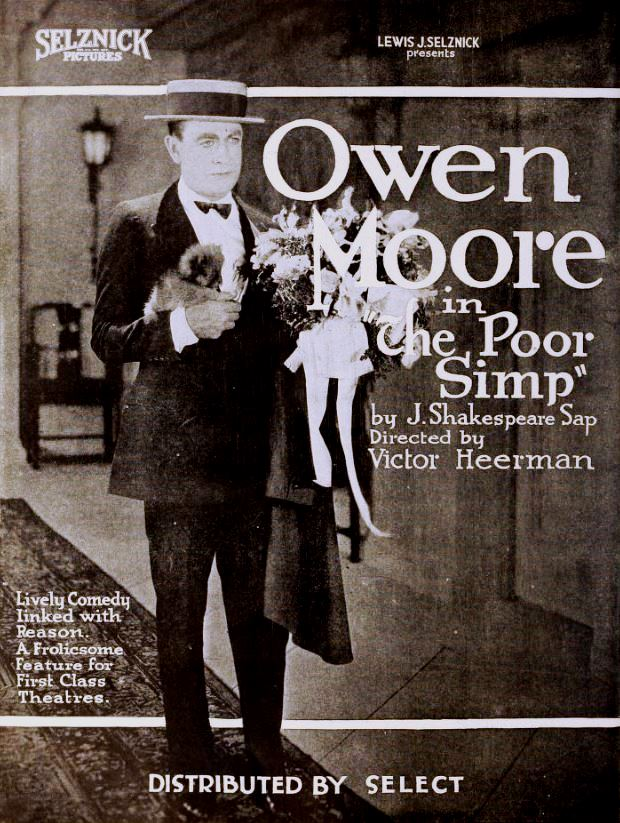
- Directed by: Victor Heerman
- Written by: Sarah Y. Mason; J. Shakespeare Sap
- Produced by: Lewis J. Selznick
- Starring: Owen Moore; Nell Craig; Harry L. Rattenberry
- Cinematography: Merritt B. Gerstad; Glen MacWilliams
- Edited by: Duncan Mansfield
- Production company: Selznick Pictures
- Distributed by: Selznick Pictures
- Release date: August 20, 1920
- Running time: 50 minutes
- Country: United States
- Language: Silent (English intertitles)

The Poor Simp is a 1920 American silent comedy film directed by Victor Heerman and starring Owen Moore, Nell Craig, and Harry L. Rattenberry.

== Plot ==
As described in a film magazine review, Melville G. Carruthers, a wealthy young man, is in love with Grace Adams. He plucks up enough courage to propose to her after knowing her for a long time, but makes a fiasco of it when the crucial time comes. Another admirer enters and monopolizes her attention. Strolling into the slums, Melville meets Sadie Kelly, gets into a rowdy fight, is bumped on the head, and his mind temporarily affected. Grace and her mother, being notified, hurry to his apartment only to find him having his head being gently bathed by Sadie. The two misunderstand the situation and leave indignantly. After a number of complications and humorous situations, it all comes out right and Melville makes a successful proposal after all.

== Cast ==
- Owen Moore as Melville G. Carruthers
- Nell Craig as Grace Adams
- Harry L. Rattenberry as Peter Adams
- Vera Lewis as Mrs. Adams
- Herbert Prior as Dr. Crawford
- Lassie Young as Sadie Kelly
- Tom Kennedy as Jim Donnelly
- Douglas Carter as Clarence

== Preservation ==
With no holdings located in archives, The Poor Simp is considered a lost film.

== Bibliography ==
- Brent E. Walker. Mack Sennett’s Fun Factory: A History and Filmography of His Studio and His Keystone and Mack Sennett Comedies, with Biographies of Players and Personnel. McFarland, 2013. ISBN 9780786477111
