= Once a Plumber =

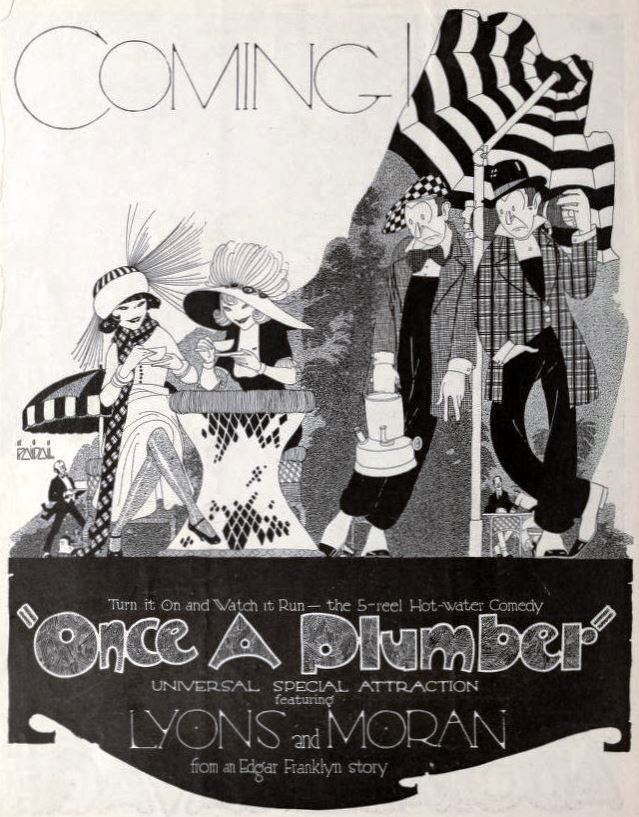
- Film poster
- Directed by: Eddie Lyons; Lee Moran
- Written by: C.B. Hoadley; Edgar Franklin
- Starring: Eddie Lyons; Lee Moran; George B. Williams
- Cinematography: Alfred Gosden
- Production company: Universal Film Manufacturing Company
- Distributed by: Universal Film Manufacturing Company
- Release date: September 27, 1927
- Running time: 5 reels
- Country: United States
- Language: Silent (English intertitles)

Once a Plumber is a 1920 comedy film directed by Eddie Lyons. It was produced and distributed by Universal Pictures.

== Plot ==
There are two plumbers who are anxious to find a quicker way of getting rich than by plumbing (if such is possible). They think they find it when they are elected president and secretary of a copper mining company. They find that the duties of the president and secretary consist of wearing jazzy sport clothes, drinking lots of gin rickeys and being vamped by a duo of pleasing experts. A little later some detectives arrive, and they find that another of their duties is to be the goats for the fraudulent promoters of a fake company. Instead of finding a quick way to get in a palace, they find it a quick way to get in jail.

== Cast ==
- Eddie Lyons as William Wilson
- Lee Moran as Joseph Blynn
- George B. Williams as Hoban
- Sydney Deane as Fenelon
- Jeff Osborne as Parker
- Lillian Hackett as Mary Foster
- Edna Mae Wilson as Kate Beard
- Jane Elliott as Gertrude Parker
- Ethel Ritchie as Ethel Fenelon
- Lew Short as Detective

== Reception ==
In a contemporary review for Motion Picture News, Frank Leonard called it an "Average economy which should interest". He praised the acting, but criticized the lack of slapstick humor.

A contemporary review in the The Chicago Defender called it a "clever and good humored farce".
