= Harry L. Rattenberry =

American actor

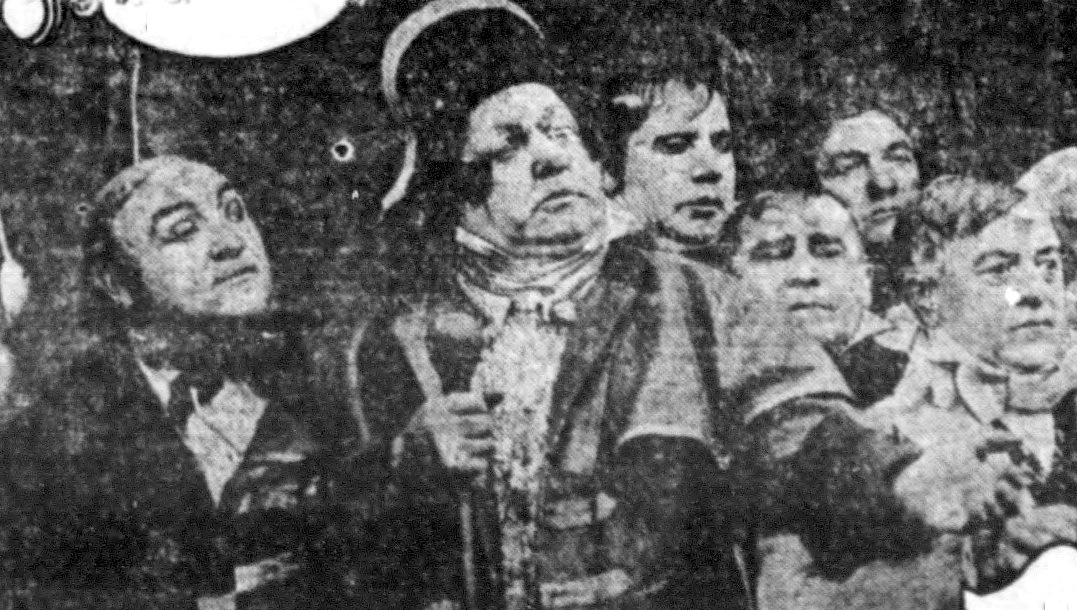
- H. L. Rattenberry (center) with other cast members in the 1916 adaption of Oliver Twist.
- Born: December 14, 1857; Sacramento, California
- Died: December 9, 1925 (aged 67); Los Angeles, California
- Occupation: Actor
- Years active: 1913-1925

Harry L. Rattenberry (December 14, 1857 – December 9, 1925) was an American actor. He appeared in more than 120 films between 1913 and 1925. He was born in Sacramento, California and died in Los Angeles, California. His parents were William Henry Rattenberry and Mary Ann Broomhead, a former wife of notable Mormon missionary Cyrus H. Wheelock.

Rattenberry's performances on stage included work with the stock companies at the Alcazar, Central, and Tivoli theaters in San Francisco.

Rattenberry's wife, Cora, died in July 1910.

== Partial filmography ==
- Lucille Love, Girl of Mystery (1914)
- Wanted: A Leading Lady (1915)
- Where the Heather Blooms (1915)
- Love and a Savage (1915)
- Some Chaperone (1915)
- Oliver Twist (1916)
- A Marked Man (1917)
- '49–'17 (1917)
- The Mysterious Mr. Tiller (1917)
- Indiscreet Corinne (1917)
- High Speed (1917)
- Limousine Life (1918)
- Almost Married (1919)
- The Poor Simp (1920)
- The Broken Spur (1921)
- A Motion to Adjourn (1921)
- Watch Your Step (1922)
- The Weak-End Party (1922)
- Soul of the Beast (1923)
- The Printer's Devil (1923)
- Zeb vs. Paprika (1924)
- The Dramatic Life of Abraham Lincoln (1924)
