= Film studio =

Organization that produces films

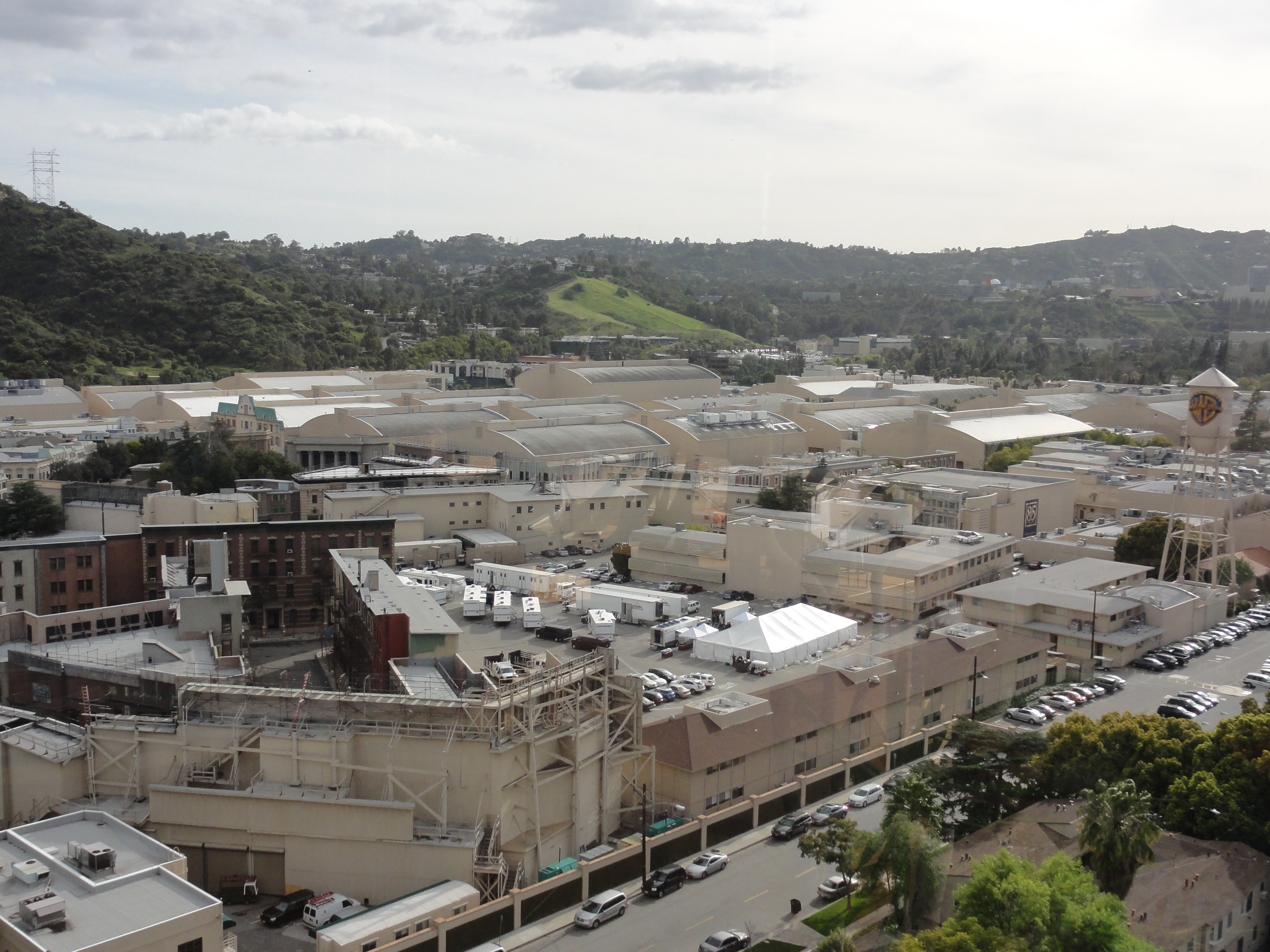
View of the Warner Bros. Studios in Burbank.

A film studio (also known as movie studio or simply studio) is a major entertainment company that makes films. Today, studios are mostly financing and distribution entities. In addition, they may have their own studio facility or facilities; however, most firms in the entertainment industry have never had their own studios, but have rented space from other companies instead. Day-to-day filming operations are generally handled by a production company subsidiary.

Another type of company is an independently owned studio facility, which does not produce motion pictures by itself; such facilities only sell studio space.

== Beginnings ==
In 1893, Thomas Edison built the first movie studio in the United States: he constructed the Black Maria, a tarpaper-covered structure near his laboratories in West Orange, New Jersey, and he asked circus, vaudeville, and dramatic actors to perform for the camera. He distributed these movies at vaudeville theaters, penny arcades, wax museums, and fairgrounds.

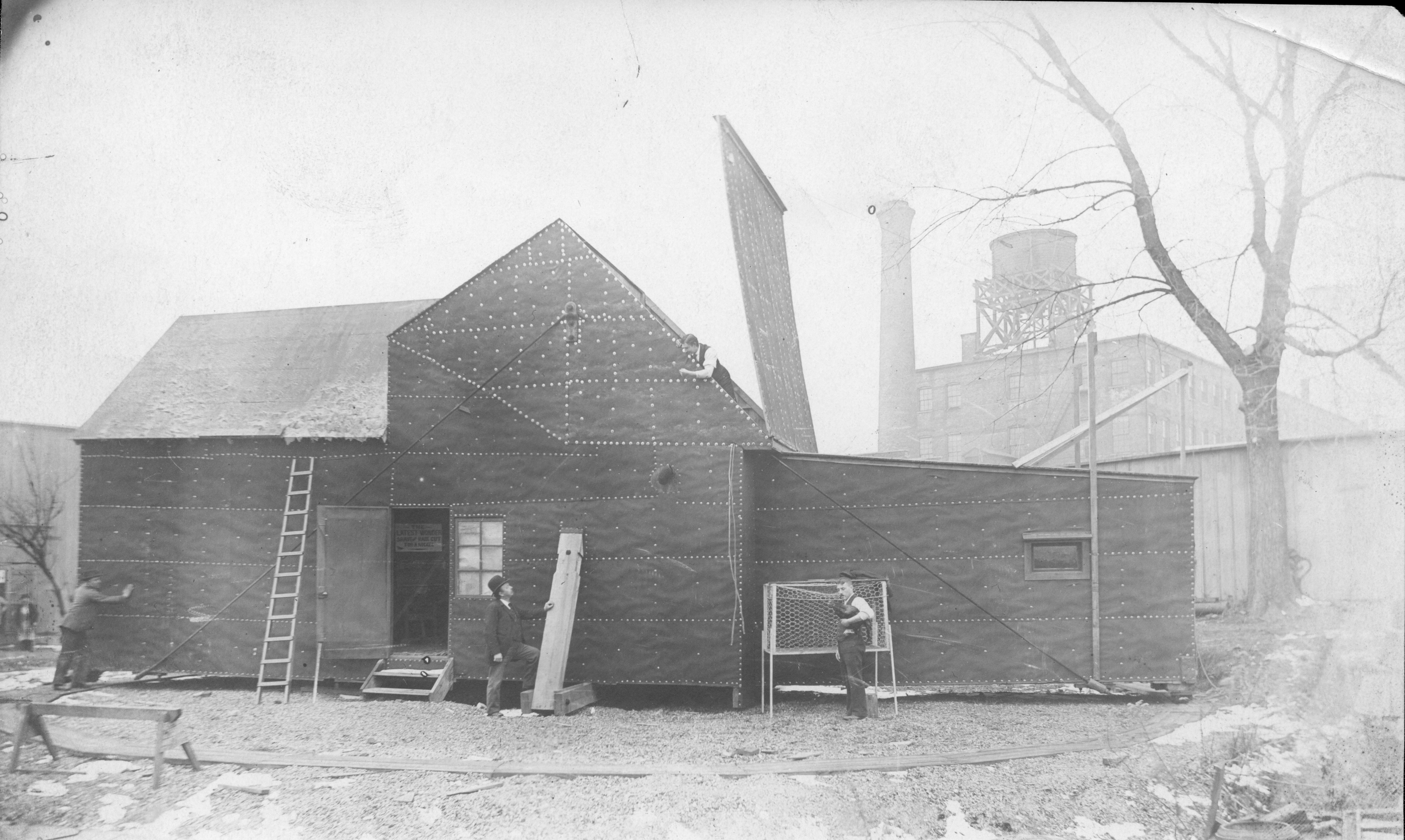
Edison's Black Maria, the world's first film studio

The pioneering Thanhouser movie studio was founded in New Rochelle, New York in 1909 by American theatrical impresario Edwin Thanhouser. The company produced and released 1,086 movies between 1910 and 1917, successfully distributing them around the world.

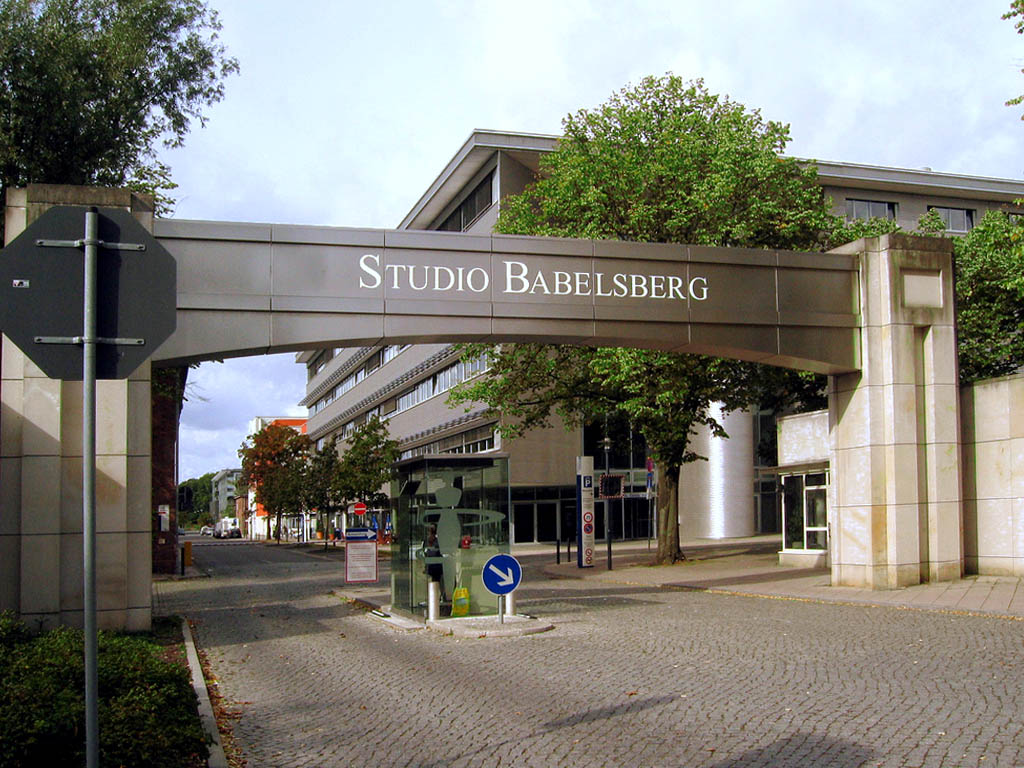
The Babelsberg Studio near Berlin was the first large-scale film studio in the world and the forerunner to Hollywood. It still produces movies every year.

In the early 1900s, companies started moving to Los Angeles, California, for location shoots. Although electric lights were widely available by that time, none were powerful enough to expose film adequately; the best illumination for film production came from natural sunlight. Some movies were shot on building roofs in downtown Los Angeles. Edison's Motion Picture Patents Company, based in New York City, controlled almost all patents relevant to movie production at the time. Early movie producers relocated to Southern California to escape patent enforcement, an advantage of more lenient local courts, as well as physical distance from company detectives and mob allies. (Edison's patents expired in 1913.)

The first film studio in Los Angeles was a branch studio of Selig Polyscope, in the Edendale area in 1909. The first studio in the Hollywood area was Nestor Studios, opened in 1911 by Al Christie for David Horsley. In the same year, another 15 independent studios settled in Hollywood. Other production companies eventually settled in the Los Angeles area in places such as Culver City, Burbank, and what would soon become known as Studio City in the San Fernando Valley. Los Angeles had a strong, early, public-health response to the 1918 flu epidemic, relative to other American cities, which reduced the number of local cases and led to a faster overall recovery; this contributed to the increasing dominance of Hollywood over New York City in the movie industry.

== The majors ==
In the 1930s and 1940s, now considered the peak of the studio system, eight film studios—Universal, Fox (later 20th Century Fox), Paramount, United Artists, Warner Bros., Columbia, Metro-Goldwyn-Mayer, and RKO—controlled film production, with writers, actors, and directors typically under contract to individual studios. This would be the norm until the 1950s. A 1948 Supreme Court ruling (United States v. Paramount Pictures Inc.) that challenged the studio system under antitrust laws and shifting societal factors, like suburbanization, negatively impacted studios and hurt movie theater attendance.

The Big 5

By the mid-1920s, a handful of American production companies had evolved into motion-picture conglomerates that owned their own studios, distribution divisions, and theaters, and contracted with performers and other filmmaking personnel. This situation led to the sometimes confusing equation of studio with production company in industry slang. Five large companies—RKO Radio Pictures, 20th Century Fox, Paramount Pictures, Warner Bros., and Metro-Goldwyn-Mayer—came to be known as the Big Five, the majors, or the Studios in trade publications such as Variety; their management structures and practices collectively came to be known as the studio system.

The Little 3

Although they owned few or no theaters to guarantee sales of their films, several other studios also fell under the rubrics above: Universal Pictures, Columbia Pictures, and United Artists. There were thus a total of eight generally recognized major studios. United Artists, although its controlling partners owned two production studios during the Golden Age, often had a tenuous hold on the title of major; this studio operated mainly as a backer and distributor of independently produced films.

== The minors ==
Smaller studios operated simultaneously to the majors. These minors included Republic Pictures, active from 1935, which produced films that occasionally matched the scale and ambition of larger studios; the minors also included Monogram Pictures, which specialized in series and genre releases. Together with smaller outfits such as PRC TKO and Grand National, the minor studios filled the demand for B movies and are sometimes collectively referred to as Poverty Row.

== The independents ==
The Big Five's ownership of movie theaters was eventually opposed by eight independent producers, including Samuel Goldwyn, David O. Selznick, Walt Disney, Hal Roach, and Walter Wanger. In 1948, the federal government won a case against Paramount in the Supreme Court: the court ruled that the vertically integrated structure of the movie industry constituted an illegal monopoly. This decision, reached after twelve years of litigation, accelerated the end of the studio system and Hollywood's "Golden Age".

== Film to television ==
Midway through the 1950s, with television proving to be a lucrative enterprise that was unlikely to fade soon—as many people in the film industry had once hoped—movie studios were increasingly utilized to create programming for the expanding medium. Some midsize film companies, such as Republic Pictures, eventually sold their studios to TV production concerns, which were later bought by larger studios; an example was the American Broadcasting Company, which was purchased by Disney in 1996.

== Independent film and the studios ==
In the 1980s and 1990s, as the cost of professional 16 mm film equipment decreased—along with the emergence of non-film innovations such as S-VHS and Mini-DV cameras—many young filmmakers began to make films outside the studio system. Filmmakers and producers such as Mike Judge, Adam Sandler, Jim Jarmusch, Robert Rodriguez, Steven Soderbergh, Quentin Tarantino, Kevin Smith and Richard Linklater made films that pushed artistic boundaries beyond studio norms. In response to these films (many distributed by mini-studios such as Miramax), the majors created in-house mini-studios to focus on edgier, independent content. Focus Features was created for this purpose by Universal Pictures, as was Fox Searchlight by 20th Century Fox.

== Today ==
With the growing diversification of studios into such fields as video games, television stations, broadcast syndication, television, theme parks, home video and publishing, studios have become multi-national corporations.

International markets account for a growing proportion of Hollywood movie revenue, with approximately 70% of total movie revenue coming from international ticket sales; the Chinese domestic box-office revenue is projected to outpace that of US in 2020. The growth of film studios and filmmaking outside of Hollywood and the US has produced popular international studio locations such as Hollywood North (Vancouver and Toronto in Canada), Bollywood (Mumbai, India), and Nollywood (Lagos, Nigeria).

As the studios grew, they began to rely on production companies such as J. J. Abrams' Bad Robot to handle many creative and physical aspects of feature films. By reducing direct production activities, the studios transformed into financing and distribution entities for their films (generally made by affiliated production companies). With the decreasing cost of CGI and visual effects, many studios sold large chunks of previously massive studio spaces or backlots to private real-estate developers. Century City in Los Angeles was once part of the 20th Century Fox backlot, which was among the largest and most famous of the studio lots. In most cases, portions of the backlots were retained and are available for rental by various film and television productions. Some studios offer tours of their backlots; Universal Pictures allows visitors to its adjacent Universal Studios Hollywood theme park to take a tram tour of the backlot where films such as Psycho and Back to the Future were shot.

In fall 2019, movie mogul Tyler Perry opened Tyler Perry Studios in Atlanta. Perry's studio lot is claimed to be larger than many studio lots in Hollywood.

== Typical components ==
Since the Hollywood golden age the physical components of a typical movie studio had become standardized. Since that time a movie studio has usually been housed on a "studio lot." Physically, a studio lot is a secure compound enclosed by a tall perimeter wall. This security is necessary to protect filmmaking operations from unwanted interference by paparazzi and over-enthusiastic fans of movie stars. Movement in and out of the studio lot is normally restricted to specific gates (often capped with decorative arches), where visitors must stop at a boom barrier and explain the purpose of their visit to a security guard.

The sound stage is the central component of a studio lot. Most studios have several: small studios may have as few as one, and large studios have as many as 20 to 30. Movie studios also provide office space for studio executives and production companies, and makeup rooms and rehearsal rooms for talent. If space allows, a studio may have an exterior backlot. Finally, there is a studio "commissary", which is the traditional term in the movie industry for a company cafeteria.

Beyond these basic components, the largest studios are full-service enterprises offering the range of production and post-production services necessary to create a motion picture; these services include costumes, props, cameras, sound recording, crafts, sets, lighting, special effects, cutting, editing, mixing, scoring, automated dialogue replacement (ADR), re-recording, and foley. Independent suppliers of these and other services (e.g., photographic processing labs) are often found in clusters near film studios.

Sets and backlots have always been highly flammable, and nitrate film (manufactured until 1951) was also very flammable. For this reason, film studios built in the early-to-mid 20th century have water towers to facilitate firefighting. These towers "somewhat inexplicably" evolved into "a most potent symbol ... of movie studios in general."

== See also ==
- Major film studios
- Film producer
- Film release
- History of film
- Outline of film
- Production company
- Television studio
- Recording studio
