= A Shocking Night =

1921 film

- Directed by: Eddie Lyons; Lee Moran
- Written by: Edgar Franklin; C.B. Hoadley
- Produced by: Carl Laemmle
- Starring: Eddie Lyons; Lee Moran; Alta Allen
- Cinematography: Alfred Gosden
- Production company: Universal Pictures
- Distributed by: Universal Pictures
- Release date: January 1921
- Running time: 50 minutes
- Country: United States
- Languages: Silent; English intertitles

A Shocking Night is a 1921 American silent comedy film directed by and starring Eddie Lyons and Lee Moran. The cast also included Alta Allen and Lionel Belmore. A print of A Shocking Night exists at the Cinémathèque française film archive in Paris, France.

== Cast ==
- Eddie Lyons as Richard Thayer
- Lee Moran as William Harcourt
- Alta Allen as Bessie Lane
- Lillian Hall as Maude Harcourt
- Lionel Belmore as Bill Bradford
- Clark Comstock as Jack Lane
- Florence Mayon as Cook
- Charles McHugh as Butler

== Bibliography ==
- Connelly, Robert B. The Silents: Silent Feature Films, 1910-36, Volume 40, Issue 2. December Press, 1998.
- Munden, Kenneth White. The American Film Institute Catalog of Motion Pictures Produced in the United States, Part 1. University of California Press, 1997.
