= An Elephant on His Hands =

1913 film

- Directed by: Al Christie
- Written by: Unknown
- Produced by: David Horsley; Nestor Film Co.
- Starring: Lon Chaney; Eddie Lyons; Lee Moran; Ramona Langley
- Distributed by: Universal Film Manufacturing Company
- Release date: November 21, 1913
- Running time: 10 minutes (1 reel)
- Country: United States
- Languages: Silent; English intertitles

An Elephant on His Hands is a 1913 American silent short comedy film directed by Al Christie, and starring Eddie Lyons, Lee Moran, and Lon Chaney. The film is now considered lost.

== Plot ==
Ramona is fond of pets, but her hubby, Eddie, has a horror of all animals. The parrots bite him and the monkeys bare their teeth at him. They receive a wire from Eddie's uncle saying that his circus has gone broke and that he is sending his pet elephant to Eddie to care for it. Despite his protests, Ramona sends Eddie over to the train station to pick up the beast. First, Eddie has to pay a $300 shipping bill, and then the stable he rented doesn't allow him to keep elephants there. When they try to keep the creature in their backyard, neighbors complain and authorities order it removed. The last scene shows the elephant dragging a furniture van with Ramona sitting up on top of it and Eddie leading the procession.

== Cast ==
- Lon Chaney as Eddie
- Ramona Langley
- Eddie Lyons
- Lee Moran
- Charlie the Elephant

== Reception ==
Moving Picture World opined "In this comedy, it is probable that most of the fun will come from the antics of the animals, two of which are featured -- a monkey and an elephant. The osculatory (kissing) feats of the former are bound to convulse any house."
