= Eleanor Daniels =

Welsh actress, singer (1886–1994)

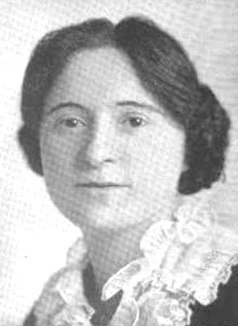
- Daniels in a 1914 publication
- Born: 28 December 1886; Llanarthney, Carmarthenshire, UK
- Died: 18 March 1994 (age 107); Darien, Connecticut, US
- Other names: Ellyw (bardic name)
- Occupations: Actress, singer, vocal coach

Eleanor Jane Daniels (28 December 1886 – 18 March 1994) was a Welsh stage and film actress.

== Early life ==
Daniels was born in Llanarthney and raised in Llanelli, the daughter of hay merchant and publican David Daniels and Margaret Daniels. She had her first public success at age 13, when she won a prize at a local eisteddfod. She won three National Eisteddfod chairs by 1907, and studied acting with the Herbert Beerbohm Tree company.

== Career ==
Daniels taught school as a young woman, and acted in Welsh stage dramas in Great Britain. She toured the United States with the Welsh Players in 1914. She moved to the United States soon after, and appeared on stage and in silent films, with good reviews for her work, though Dorothy Parker commented that "Eleanor Daniels works enthusiastically at being funny."

Daniels' stage roles included parts in Change (London 1912, 1913, New York 1914), The Joneses (London 1913), Kitty MacKay (1914), Loyalty, Heart of the Heather, Zach, Kitty Darlin' (1917), Lassies, La La Lucille (1919, 1920), Ashes (1924), The Beaten Track (1926), Juno and the Paycock (1926), and Rain. Her film appearances included a role in If Winter Comes (1923). She was a vocal coach in New York later in life, and had an office job with a diabetes charity.

== Personal life ==
Daniels died in 1994, aged 107 years, in Darien, Connecticut. A blue plaque honouring Daniels was unveiled in Llanelli in 2011.
