= Russell Bassett =

American actor

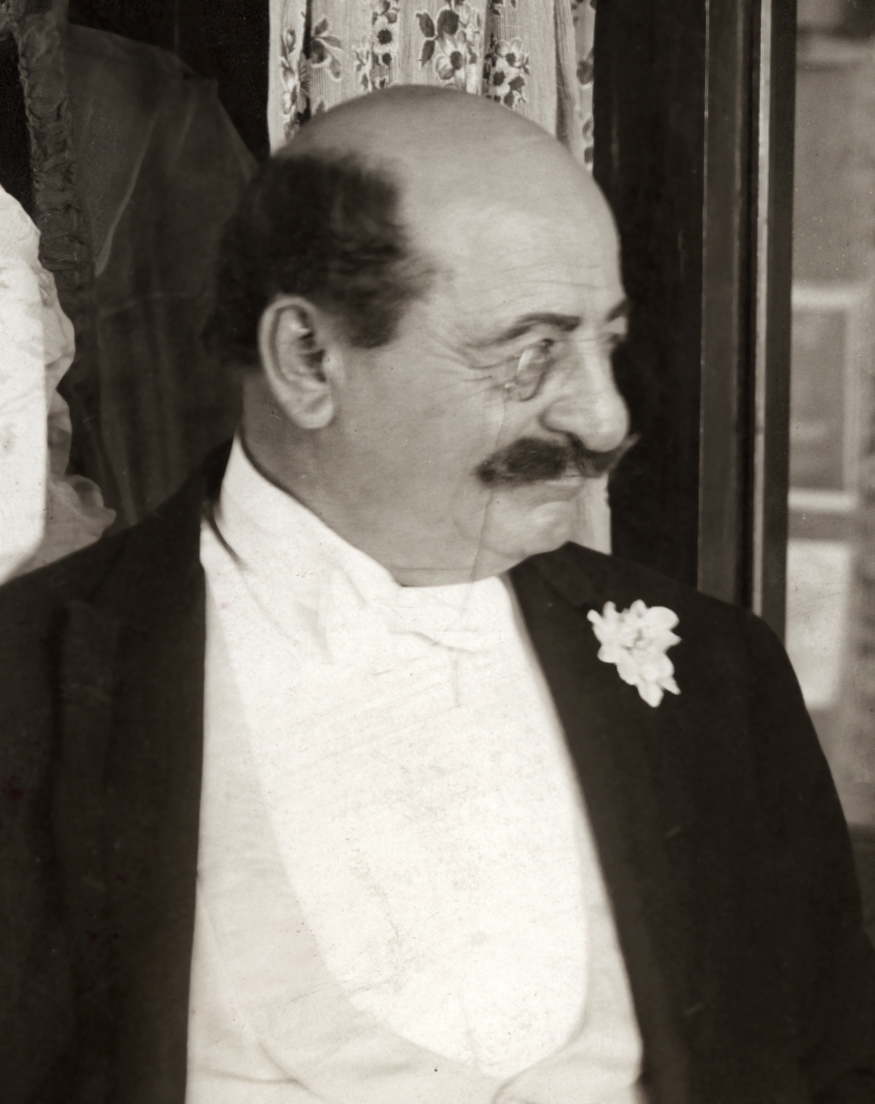
- Bassett in detail of film still for Behind the Scenes (1914)
- Born: October 24, 1845; Milwaukee, Wisconsin, U.S.
- Died: May 8, 1918 (aged 72); New York City, New York, U.S.
- Occupation: Actor
- Spouse: Carlotta E.M. Bassett

Russell Bassett (October 24, 1845 – May 8, 1918) was an American stage and film actor. He appeared in 76 silent films between 1911 and 1918.

Bassett was born in Milwaukee, Wisconsin, but he moved to Oakland, California at age 3 when his father became a miner. He attended the now-defunct Brayton College in Oakland, and that was where he gained his initial acting experience.

Bassett gained early acting experience in stock theater with the Hooley Stock Company in Chicago. Later, he "toured the whole width of America, broadening, mellowing, polishing off his art." On Broadway, he appeared in The Other Fellow (1910), The Top o' th' World (1907), and Rip Van Winkle (1905).

During his film career, Bassett acted for the Biograph, Edison, Yankee, Pathe, Imp, Reliance, Nestor, and Famous Players companies.

Bassett was married and had a son. On May 8, 1918, he died from a cerebral hemorrhage at his home in New York City.

== Selected filmography ==
- When the Heart Calls (1912)
- Almost a Rescue (1913)
- The Eagle's Mate (1914)
- Such a Little Queen (1914)
- Behind the Scenes (1914)
- The Morals of Marcus (1915)
- David Harum (1915)
- Fanchon the Cricket (1915)
- Jim the Penman (1915)
- May Blossom (1915)
- Little Pal (1915)
- Sold (1915)
- Nearly a King (1916)
- Diplomacy (1916)
- Hulda from Holland (1916)
- Less Than the Dust (1916)
- Little Lady Eileen (1916)
- A Coney Island Princess (1916)
- The Honeymoon (1917)
- Public Be Damned (1917)
- Broadway Jones (1917)
- Seven Keys to Baldpate (1917)
- Hit-The-Trail Holliday (1918)
