= High Speed (1917 film) =

1917 film

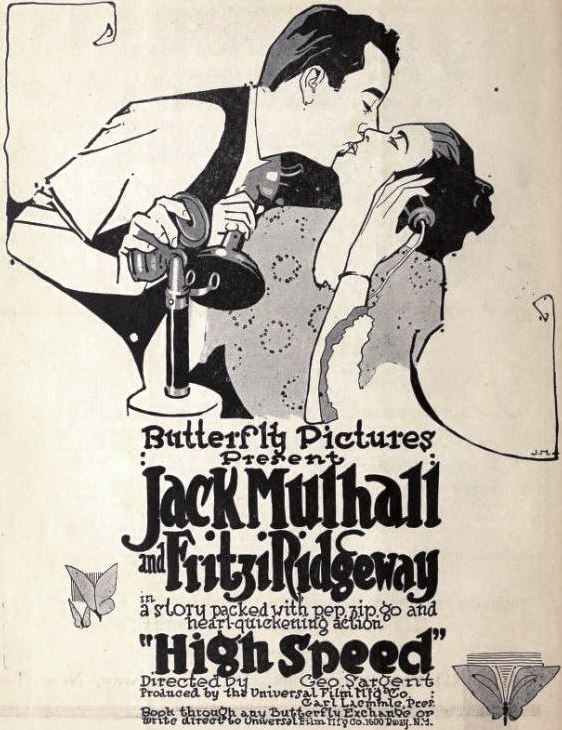
- Directed by: George L. Sargent; Elmer Clifton
- Written by: Helen Starr; Leo Sargent; Tom Gibson; H.P. Pearson
- Starring: Jack Mulhall; Fritzi Ridgeway; Harry L. Rattenberry
- Production company: Universal Pictures
- Distributed by: Universal Pictures
- Release date: July 16, 1917
- Running time: 50 minutes
- Country: United States
- Languages: Silent; English intertitles

High Speed is a 1917 American silent comedy film directed by George L. Sargent and Elmer Clifton and starring Jack Mulhall, Fritzi Ridgeway and Harry L. Rattenberry.

== Cast ==
- Jack Mulhall as 'Speed' Cannon
- Fritzi Ridgeway as Susan
- Harry L. Rattenberry as Father
- Lydia Yeamans Titus as Mother
- Albert MacQuarrie as Count Englantine
- J. Morris Foster as Count's Friend

== Bibliography ==
- Robert B. Connelly. The Silents: Silent Feature Films, 1910-36, Volume 40, Issue 2. December Press, 1998.
