= Ever Since Eve (1921 film) =

1921 silent film

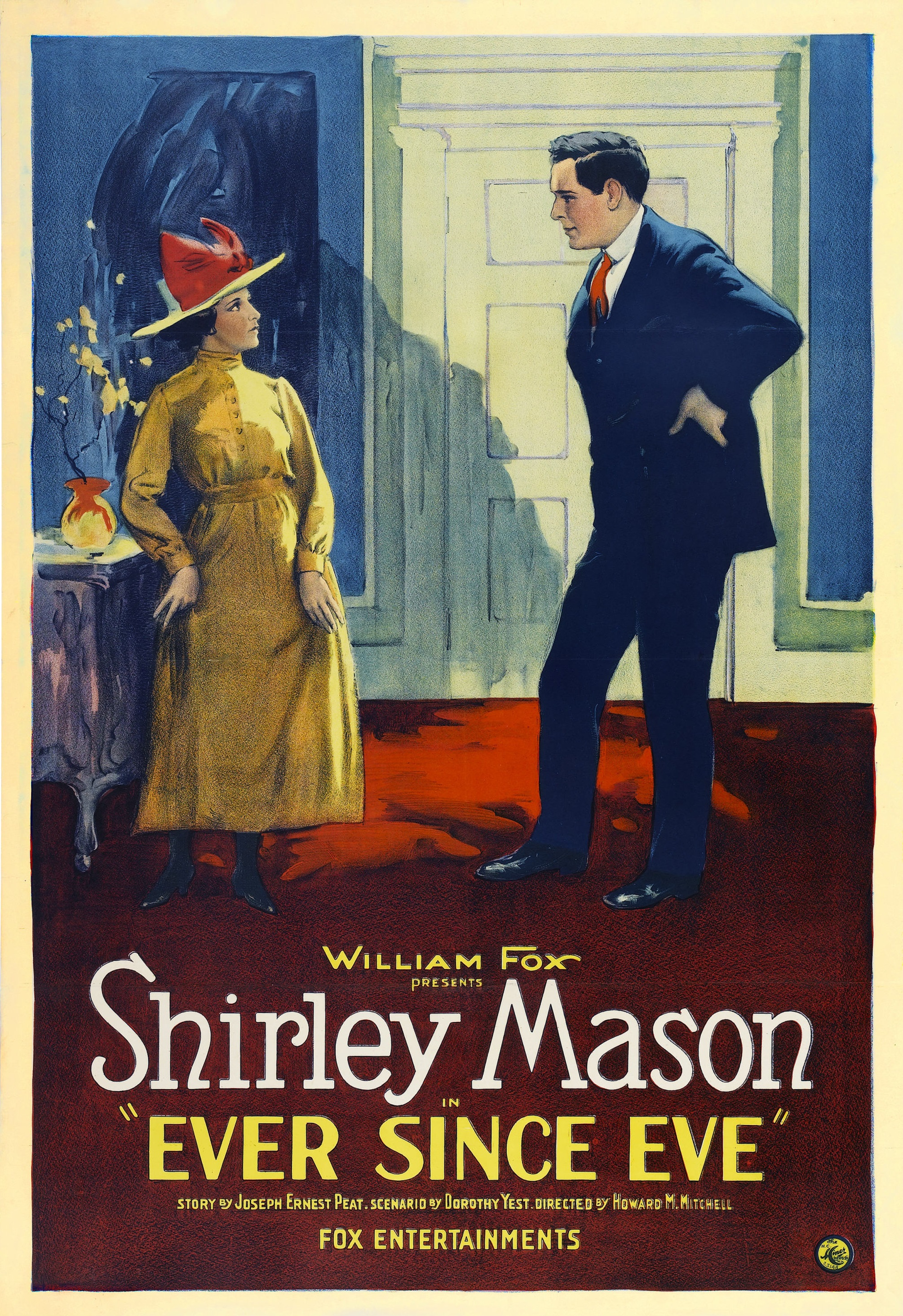
- Directed by: Howard M. Mitchell
- Written by: Dorothy Yost
- Based on: Concerning Chichine short story by Joseph Ernest Peat
- Produced by: William Fox
- Starring: Shirley Mason; Herbert Heyes; Eva Gordon
- Cinematography: Glen MacWilliams
- Production company: Fox Film
- Distributed by: Fox Film
- Release date: August 28, 1921
- Running time: 50 minutes
- Country: United States
- Languages: Silent; English intertitles

Ever Since Eve is a 1921 American silent drama film directed by Howard M. Mitchell and starring Shirley Mason, Herbert Heyes and Eva Gordon.

== Cast ==
- Shirley Mason as Célestine Le Farge
- Herbert Heyes as Carteret
- Eva Gordon as Lorita
- Eunice Murdock Moore as Svenson
- Charles Spere as Percy Goring
- Frances Hancock as Mrs. Kerry
- Ethel Lynne as The Stranger
- Louis King as Lieutenant Gerald O'Connor

== Bibliography ==
- Munden, Kenneth White. The American Film Institute Catalog of Motion Pictures Produced in the United States, Part 1. University of California Press, 1997.
