= Alfred Gosden =

British cinematographer

Alfred G. Gosden
- Born: 9 July 1873; London, UK
- Died: 22 September 1941 (aged 68); Los Angeles, California, United States
- Occupation: Cinematographer
- Years active: 1912–1926 (film)

Alfred G. Gosden (9 July 1873 – 22 September 1941) was a British cinematographer active in the American film industry during the silent era. Before moving to Hollywood he filmed in Kinemacolor, most notably with the Natural Color Kinematograph Company, filming the documentary With Our King and Queen Through India and later with the Kinemacolor Company of America. In America he worked on a number of films for Triangle, Universal Pictures and other studios.

== Selected filmography ==
- Don Quixote (1915)
- Sunshine Dad (1916)
- Mr. Goode, Samaritan (1916)
- The Wharf Rat (1916)
- Princess Virtue (1917)
- Time Locks and Diamonds (1917)
- Jim Bludso (1917)
- Face Value (1918)
- Old Hartwell's Cub (1918)
- Beauty in Chains (1918)
- New Love for Old (1918)
- A Mother's Secret (1918)
- The City of Tears (1918)
- The Brazen Beauty (1918)
- Set Free (1918)
- The Spitfire of Seville (1919)
- Pretty Smooth (1919)
- The Wicked Darling (1919)
- The Woman Under Cover (1919)
- The Unpainted Woman (1919)
- The Exquisite Thief (1919)
- The Girl in the Rain (1920)
- Once a Plumber (1920)
- The Breath of the Gods (1920)
- Burnt Wings (1920)
- A Shocking Night (1921)
- All Dolled Up (1921)
- The Mad Marriage (1921)
- Unseen Hands (1924)
- The Painted Lady (1924)
- The Trembling Hour (1925)
- Going the Limit (1925)
- The Canvas Kisser (1925)
- Tonio, Son of the Sierras (1925)
- Warrior Gap (1925)
- Fort Frayne (1926)
- The Call of the Klondike (1926)

== Bibliography ==
- Bell, Geoffrey. The Golden Gate and the Silver Screen. Associated University Presse, 1984 .
- McKernan, Luke Charles Urban: Pioneering the Non-Fiction Film in Britain and America, 1897-1925. University of Exeter Press, 2013.
