= Lee Moran =

American actor

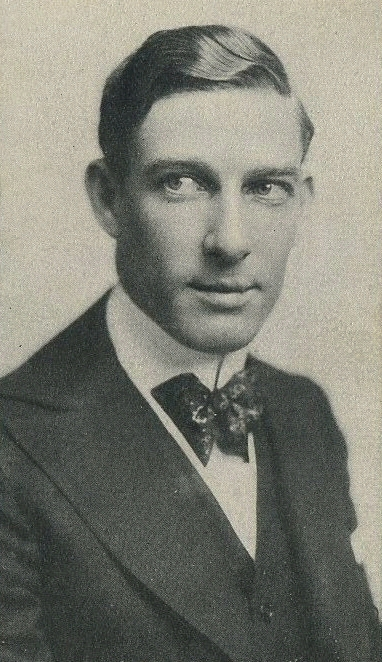
- Moran in 1917
- Born: June 23, 1888; Chicago, Illinois, U.S.
- Died: April 24, 1961 (aged 72); Woodland Hills, Los Angeles, California, U.S.
- Burial place: San Fernando Mission Cemetery
- Other name: 'Lee Morgan'
- Occupations: Actor; director; screenwriter
- Years active: 1912-1935
- Spouse: Esther Moran

Lee Moran (June 23, 1888 – April 24, 1961) was an American actor, film director, and screenwriter.

Moran was active in vaudeville before he began performing in films at Nestor Studios in 1909. He transcended the silent film era of motion pictures to the talkies. Moran appeared in more than 460 films, directed 109 and wrote for 92 between 1912 and 1935. He was born in Chicago, Illinois, and was often paired with actor Eddie Lyons. The two made one- and two-reel comedic films together for 10 years. Moran retired from films in 1936.

Moran's wife, Esther, sued him for divorce, but her attorneys asked that the suit be dismissed in September 1922. The couple agreed to an out-of-court settlement. He died from a heart ailment on April 24, 1961, in Woodland Hills, California. He is buried in San Fernando Mission Cemetery.

== Selected filmography ==
Some Shimmiers (1920) with Eddie Lyons and Lee Moran. Length 15:11. Collection EYE Film Institute Netherlands.

- When the Heart Calls (1912)
- Almost a Rescue (1913)
- Almost an Actress (1913)
- An Elephant on His Hands (1913)
- When Lizzie Got Her Polish (1914)
- When Bess Got in Wrong (1914)
- Wanted: A Leading Lady (1915)
- Their Quiet Honeymoon (1915)
- Where the Heather Blooms (1915)
- Love and a Savage (1915)
- Some Chaperone (1915)
- Jed's Trip to the Fair (1916)
- Once a Plumber (1920)
- La La Lucille (1920)
- A Shocking Night (1921)
- Listen Lester (1924)
- Where Was I? (1925)
- My Lady of Whims (1925)
- Her Big Night (1926)
- Syncopating Sue (1926)
- The Thrill Seekers (1927)
- Fast and Furious (1927)
- The Actress (1928)
- Show Girl (1928)
- The Lookout Girl (1928)
- Taxi 13 (1928)
- The Racket (1928)
- Outcast (1928)
- Ladies of the Night Club (1928)
- Dance Hall (1929)
- Glad Rag Doll (1929)
- On with the Show! (1929)
- Gold Diggers of Broadway (1929)
- The Show of Shows (1929)
- The Aviator (1929)
- No Defense (1929)
- The Fighting Gentleman (1932)
- The Death Kiss (1932)
- Sister to Judas (1932)
- Goldie Gets Along (1933)
- High Gear (1933)
- Honeymoon Limited (1933)
