= Eddie Lyons =

American actor

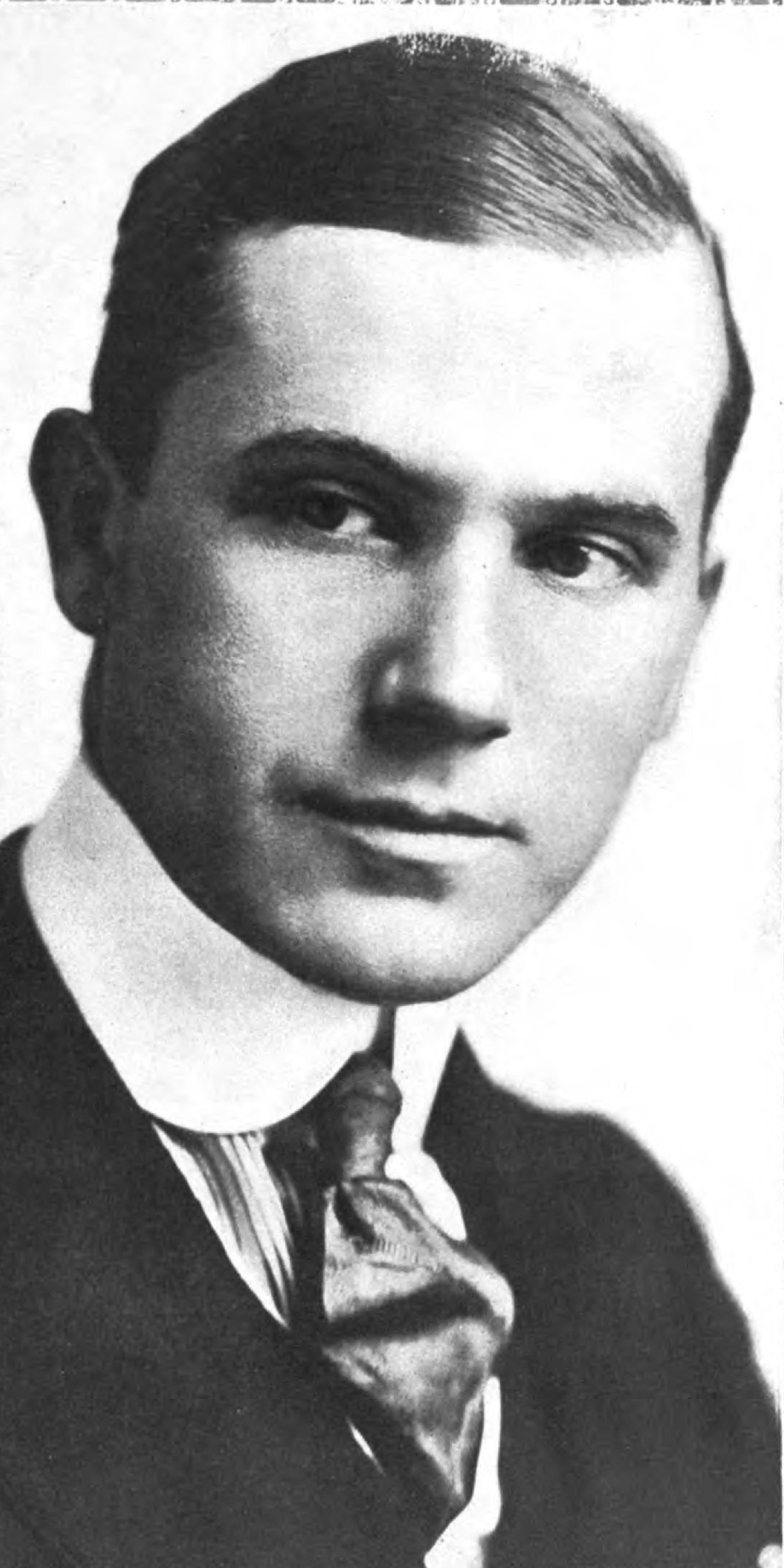
- Lyons in 1915
- Born: November 25, 1886; Beardstown, Illinois, US
- Died: August 30, 1926 (aged 39); Pasadena, California, US
- Occupations: Actor; director; screenwriter; producer
- Years active: 1911–1926
- Spouse: Virginia Kirtley (1916-1926)
- Children: 1

Eddie Lyons (November 25, 1886 – August 30, 1926) was an American film actor, director, writer, and producer of the silent era. He appeared in 388, directed 153, wrote for 93, and produced 40 films between 1911 and 1926. He was born in Beardstown, Illinois, and died in Pasadena, California. Lyons was often paired with actor Lee Moran and the two made several comedic films together.

Lyons performed in vaudeville and acted in stock theater companies in Chicago before he began acting in films. He worked for the Nestor Film Company, first as an actor and then as director of one of the company's units. His brother, Harry Lyons, also was an actor.

Lyons married actress Virginia Kirtley in 1916, and they had a daughter, Frances Lyons, who was an actress.

On August 30, 1926, Lyons died in the Bishop Sanitarium in Pasadena, California, aged 39.

== Selected filmography ==
Some shimmiers (1920), Eddie Lyons and Lee Moran. Length: 15:11. Collection EYE Film Institute Netherlands.

- The Villain Foiled (1911)
- Mrs. Matthews, Dressmaker (1912)
- Jim's Atonement (1912)
- Almost a Rescue (1913)
- An Elephant on His Hands (1913)
- By the Sun's Rays (1914)
- When Lizzie Got Her Polish (1914)
- Wanted: A Leading Lady (1915)
- Their Quiet Honeymoon (1915)
- Where the Heather Blooms (1915)
- Love and a Savage (1915)
- Some Chaperone (1915)
- Jed's Trip to the Fair (1916)
- La La Lucille (1920)
- Once a Plumber (1920)
- A Shocking Night (1921)
- Déclassée (1925)
- The Lodge in the Wilderness (1926)
- Shadow of the Law (1926)
