= Nestor Film Company =

American motion picture production company

Coordinates: 34.098280°N 118.322558°W

Nestor Studios
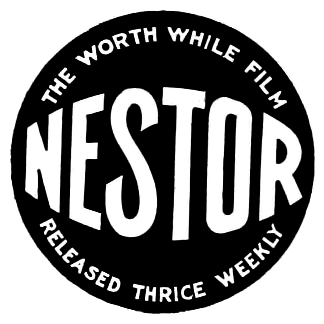
- Industry: Motion picture production company
- Founded: 1909; 117 years ago
- Defunct: 1917; 109 years ago (Universal Film Manufacturing Company part); 1920; 106 years ago (originally)
- Headquarters: Bayonne, New Jersey; Hollywood, California
- Key people: David Horsley; William Horsley

The Nestor Film Company, originally known as the Nestor Motion Picture Company, was an American motion picture production company. It was founded in 1909 as the West Coast production unit of the Centaur Film Company located in Bayonne, New Jersey. While not the first movie studio in Los Angeles, Nestor made great strides on October 27, 1911, by establishing the first permanent motion picture studio in Hollywood, California, and producing the first Hollywood films. The company later merged with its distributor, the Universal Film Manufacturing Company, on May 20, 1912. Nestor remained a recognizable brand name for Universal until at least the middle of 1917.

== History ==
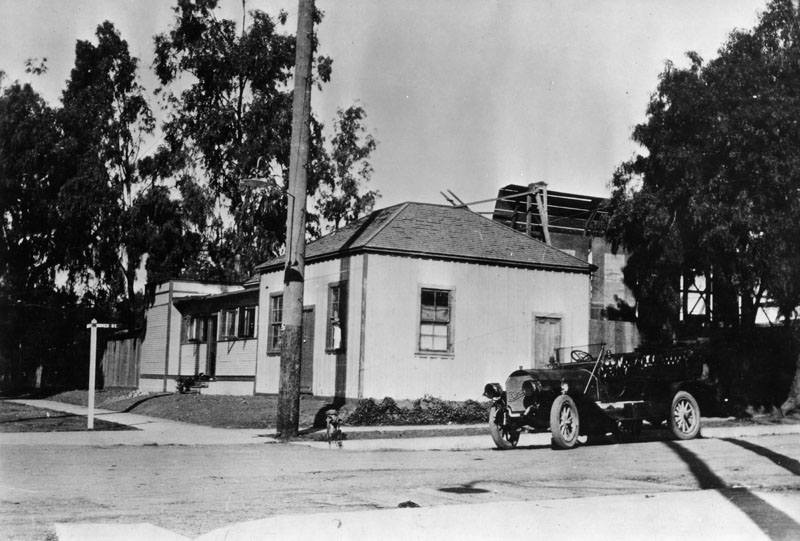
Blondeau Tavern (1911)

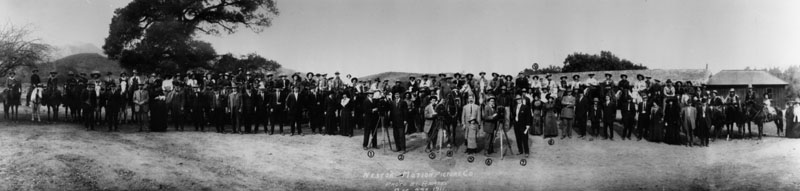
Nestor Motion Picture Company (1911)

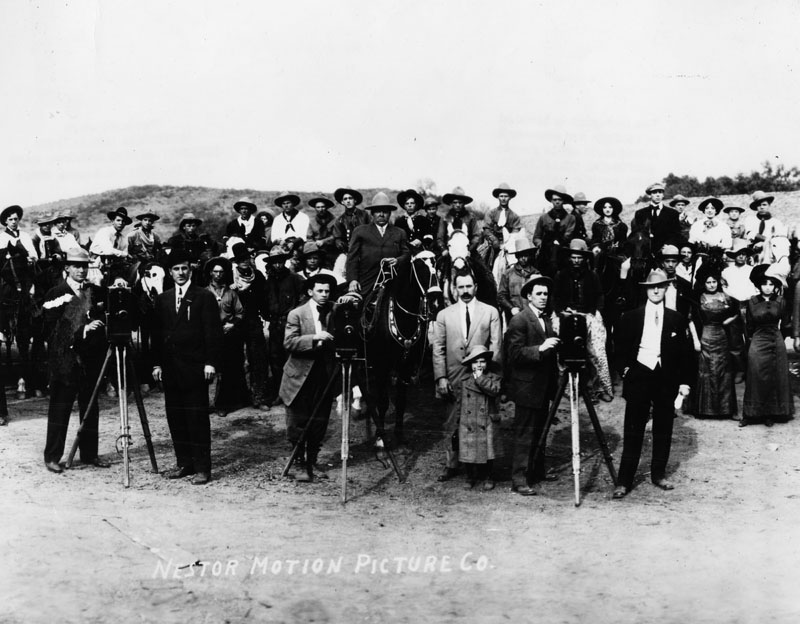
Detail of the above photo
Front row: Nestor camera operator Bill Piltz; general manager Al Christie; camera operator Walter Pritchard; Milton H. Fahrney (on horseback), director of Westerns; David Horsley with his young son; camera operator Tom Harding; Thomas Ricketts, director of dramas and comedies.

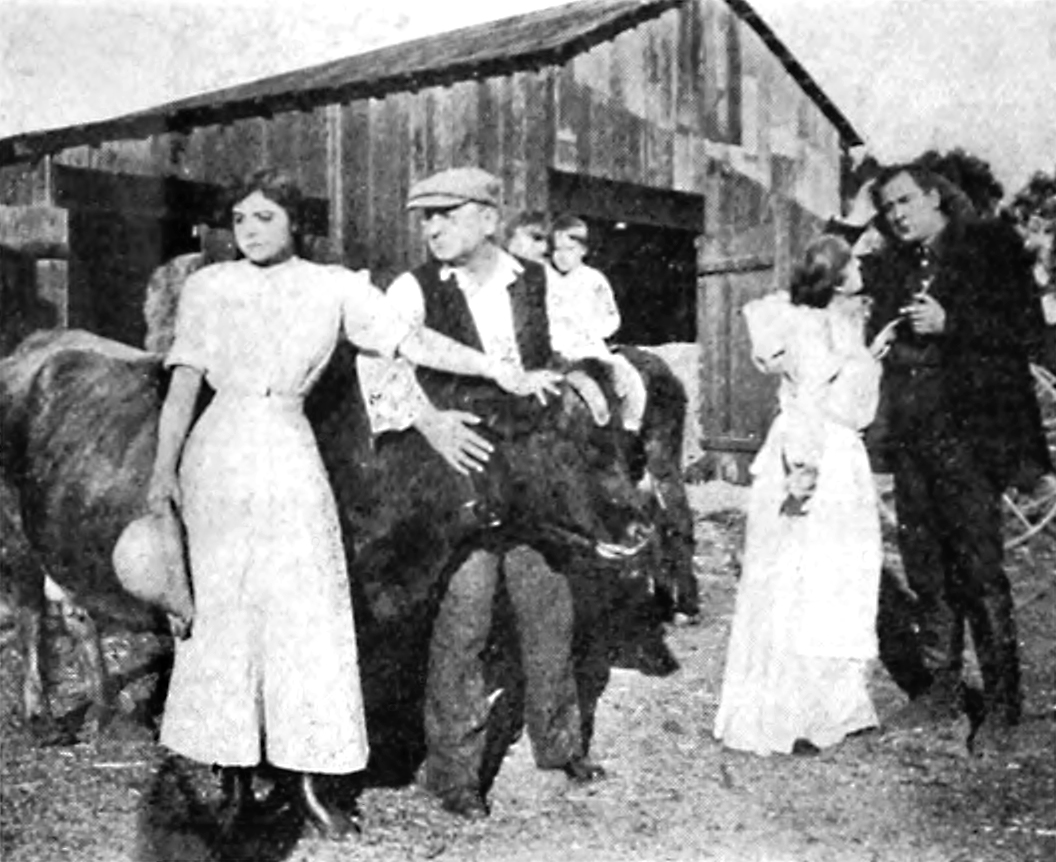
The Best Man Wins (1911), directed by Thomas Ricketts

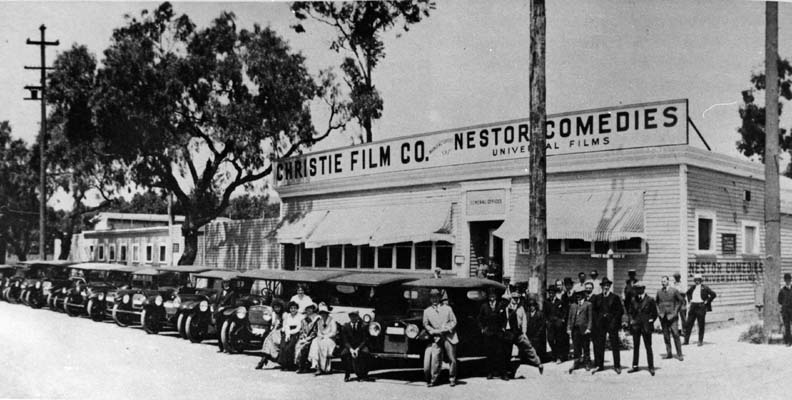
Christie–Nestor Studios (1913)

Operating on Cupid (1915), directed by Horace Davey

The Nestor Film Company was founded in 1909 as the West Coast production unit of the Centaur Film Company located in Bayonne, New Jersey, owned and operated by David Horsley and his brother, William Horsley.

On October 27, 1911, Nestor opened the first movie studio actually located in the Hollywood area of Los Angeles. It was at the Blondeau Tavern building on the northwest corner of Sunset Boulevard and Gower Street. The first motion picture stage in Hollywood was built behind the tavern.

Other East Coast studios had moved production to Los Angeles, prior to Nestor's move west. The California weather allowed for year-round filming and the ambitious studio operated three principal divisions under its Canadian-born general manager, Al Christie. Christie moved permanently to Southern California from the East, where he had been working with the Horsleys creating the popular silent-era Mutt and Jeff comedy shorts.

One division at the Hollywood location, under director Milton H. Fahrney, made a one-reel Western picture every week, while at the same time the second division, under director Tom Ricketts, turned out a one-reel drama. In addition to running the operation, Christie oversaw a weekly production of a one-reel Mutt and Jeff episode.

The Horsley brothers remained in New Jersey, where their laboratory and offices handled the Hollywood studio's film processing and distribution.

Other filmmakers began opening studios in the Hollywood area.

On May 20, 1912, the Nestor Film Company merged with the Universal Film Manufacturing Company, headed by Carl Laemmle. Several other motion picture companies, including Laemmle's Independent Moving Pictures (IMP), merged with Universal, which had been founded in April 1912. Nestor became a brand name that Universal used until at least mid-1917.

== See also ==
- History of the San Fernando Valley
- Rancho Providencia
- Providencia Ranch
- Forest Lawn Memorial Park (Hollywood Hills)
