= Christie brothers =

Canadian film directors and producers

Charles and Al Christie
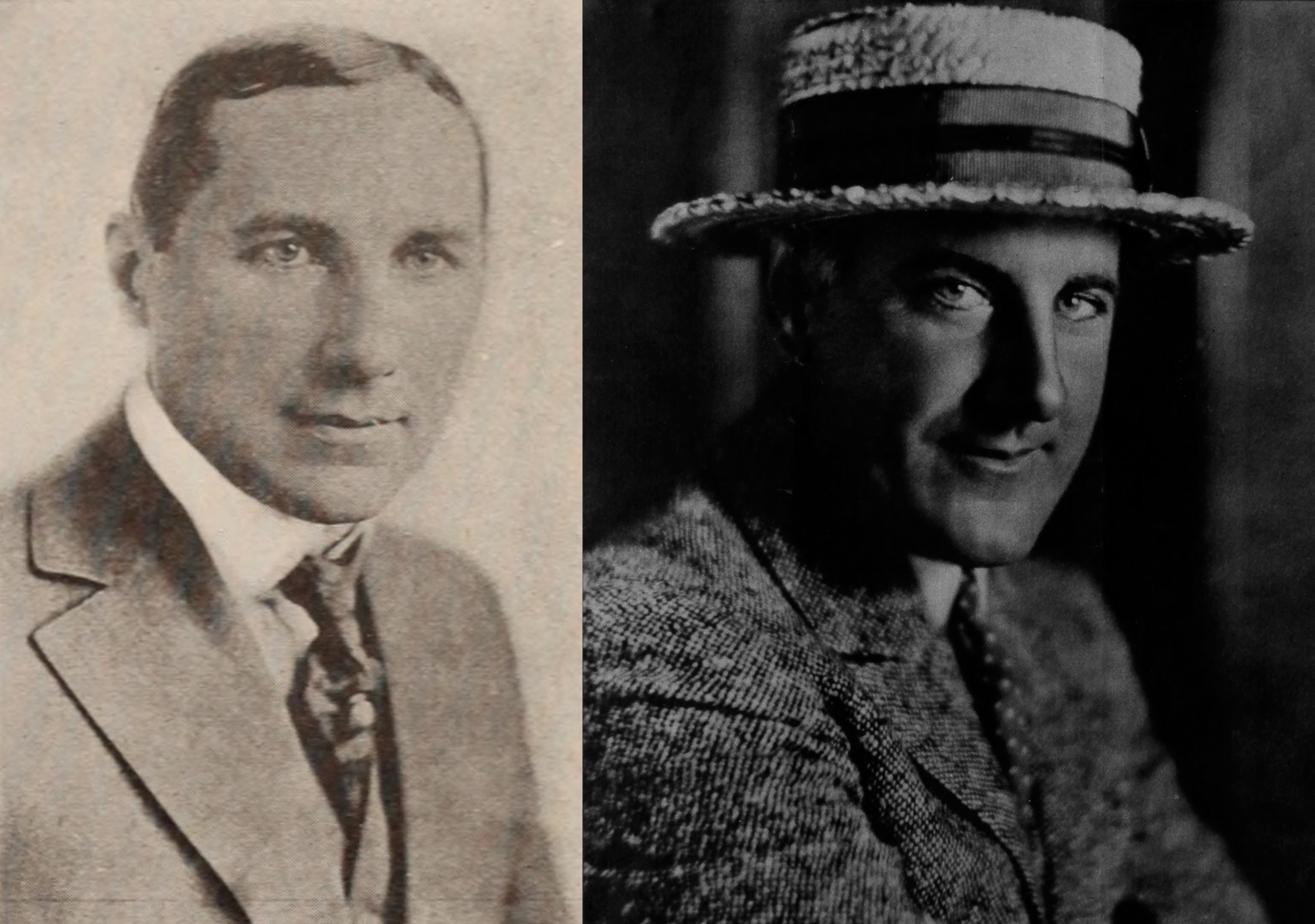
- Charles (left) and Al (right) in 1920
- Born: Charles Herbert Christie; April 13, 1882 Alfred Ernest Christie; November 23, 1886; London, Ontario, Canada (both)
- Died: Charles Herbert Christie; October 1, 1955 (aged 73) Alfred Ernest Christie; April 14, 1951 (aged 64); Beverly Hills, California, U.S. (both)
- Occupations: Film directors; producers
- Spouse: Al: Shirley Collins (m. 1911)

Charles Herbert Christie (April 13, 1882 – October 1, 1955) and Alfred Ernest Christie (November 23, 1886 – April 14, 1951) were Canadian motion picture entrepreneurs.

== Early life ==
Charles Herbert Christie was born between April 13, 1880, and April 13, 1882. Alfred Ernest Christie was born between October 23, 1881, and November 23, 1886; both were born in London, Ontario. Their father managed the Opera House in the city and their mother was its box-office manager and accountant. Charles graduated from school when he was 14; he graduated from a four-year accountancy course in two years at age 16.

== Career ==
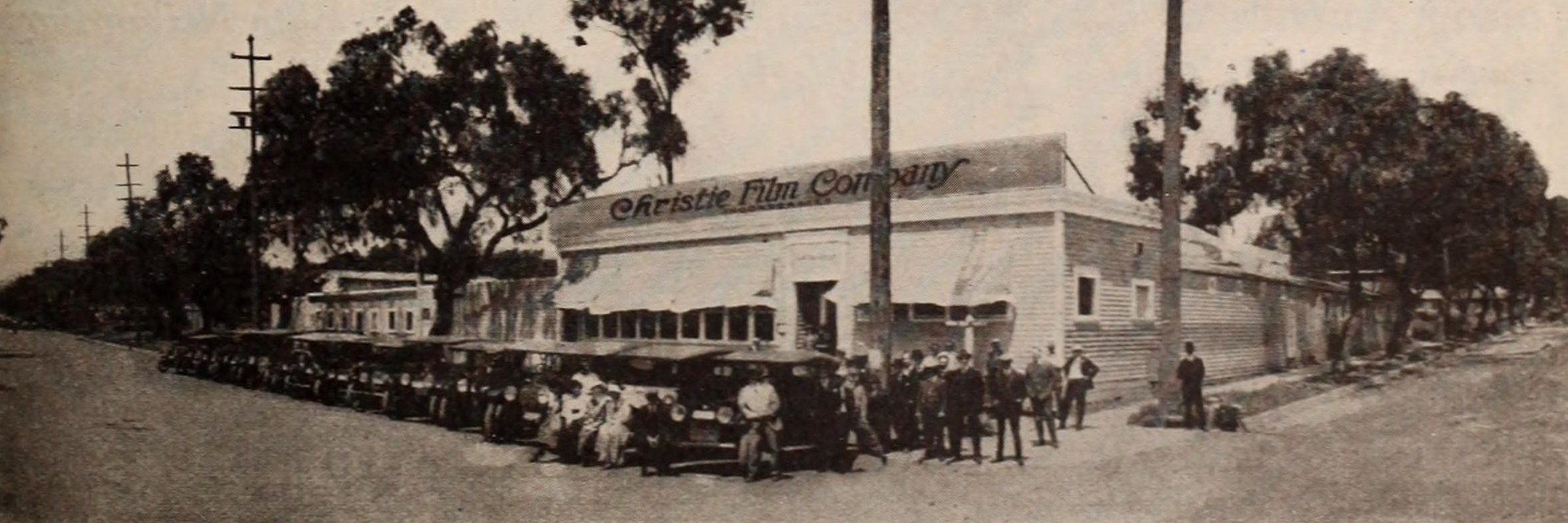
The general office of the Christie Film Company

At 23, Charles was offered a job as the stage manager for Liebler and Company and accepted it on the condition that his brother Al also be given a job. They worked for the organization for three years. Charles joined the film industry after being hired as an accountant for the Nestor Film Company. William Horsley said that "I wonder if we would have survived as a viable industry had not Charles Christie arrived to put our finances in order". Al presented a few comedy scripts and was paid $15 for both of the one-reel ideas. Al aided in establishing the Nestor Film Company in Los Angeles in 1911, and Universal Pictures began distributing all of their films in 1913.

The Christie Film Company was formed on January 6, 1916, and Al purchased the Blondeau Tavern for $15,000. The company's films were distributed by Universal and Carl Laemmle gave it $5,000 to aid in its establishment. Al wanted the company to produce an equal amount of westerns and comedies, but Charles convinced him to focus on comedies. Charles was the vice-president and general manager of the company. They ended their distribution agreement with Universal moving to Educational Pictures in 1919. From 1927 to 1928, the company's films were distributed by Paramount Pictures and then by Columbia Pictures after Paramount canceled its contract. Their films starred Betty Compson, Dorothy Devore, Lloyd Hamilton, Al St. John, Fay Tincher, and other actors.

Charles served as a director of the Motion Picture Relief Fund. He was a member of Robert M. Allan's campaign committee in 1925, while Allan was seeking reelection to the Los Angeles City Council. Charles succeeded Joseph M. Schenck as president of the Association of Motion Pictures Producers, a subsidiary of the Motion Picture Producers and Distributors of America, in 1925.

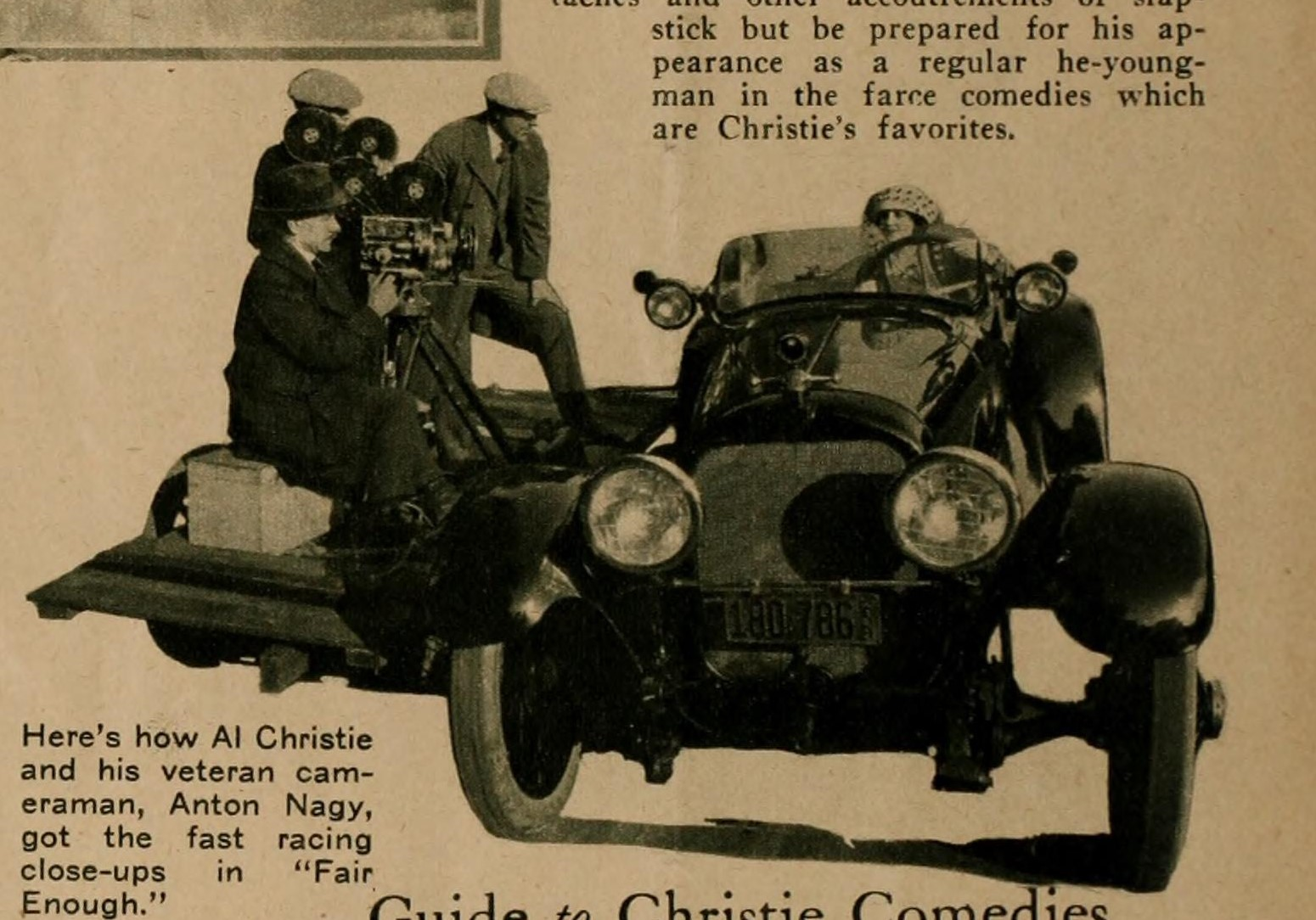
Al Christie filming a scene for Fair Enough

The Christie brothers purchased the Metropolitan Studio in the 1920s and spent over $500,000 to soundproof it. Dangerous Females was the Christie's first sound film and they produced over fifty feature-length sound films in 1929. The Christie brothers opened the Christie Hotel, the first skyscraper and also the first luxury hotel in Hollywood, California in 1922. They owned the Christie Realty Building as well.

The Christie brothers were financially ruined after the Wall Street crash of 1929. The brothers used bank loans for real estate purchases and had $2.5 million in debts by 1932. They liquidated their assets, but were $70,000 short of the amount owed. The Horsley brothers paid the remainder of their debts. Charles started selling real estate and Al went to live in New York. Al established another film studio in 1932, with the backing of Atlas Corporation Studios and the Guaranty Trust Company. He produced thirty-two films until he decided to leave the film industry in 1941. The brothers reunited and Al managed entertainment at the Douglas Aircraft Company's factory in Santa Monica which featured Lucille Ball, Milton Berle, Bing Crosby, Duke Ellington, Gracie Fields, Bob Hope, Betty Hutton, Glenn Miller, and James Stewart during the time Al was the manager.

Al said that "Very few of our negatives or prints survived" as they "couldn't afford to keep that old emulsion film in the cold storage it needed to survive". He produced over seven hundred films before his retirement.

== Personal life ==
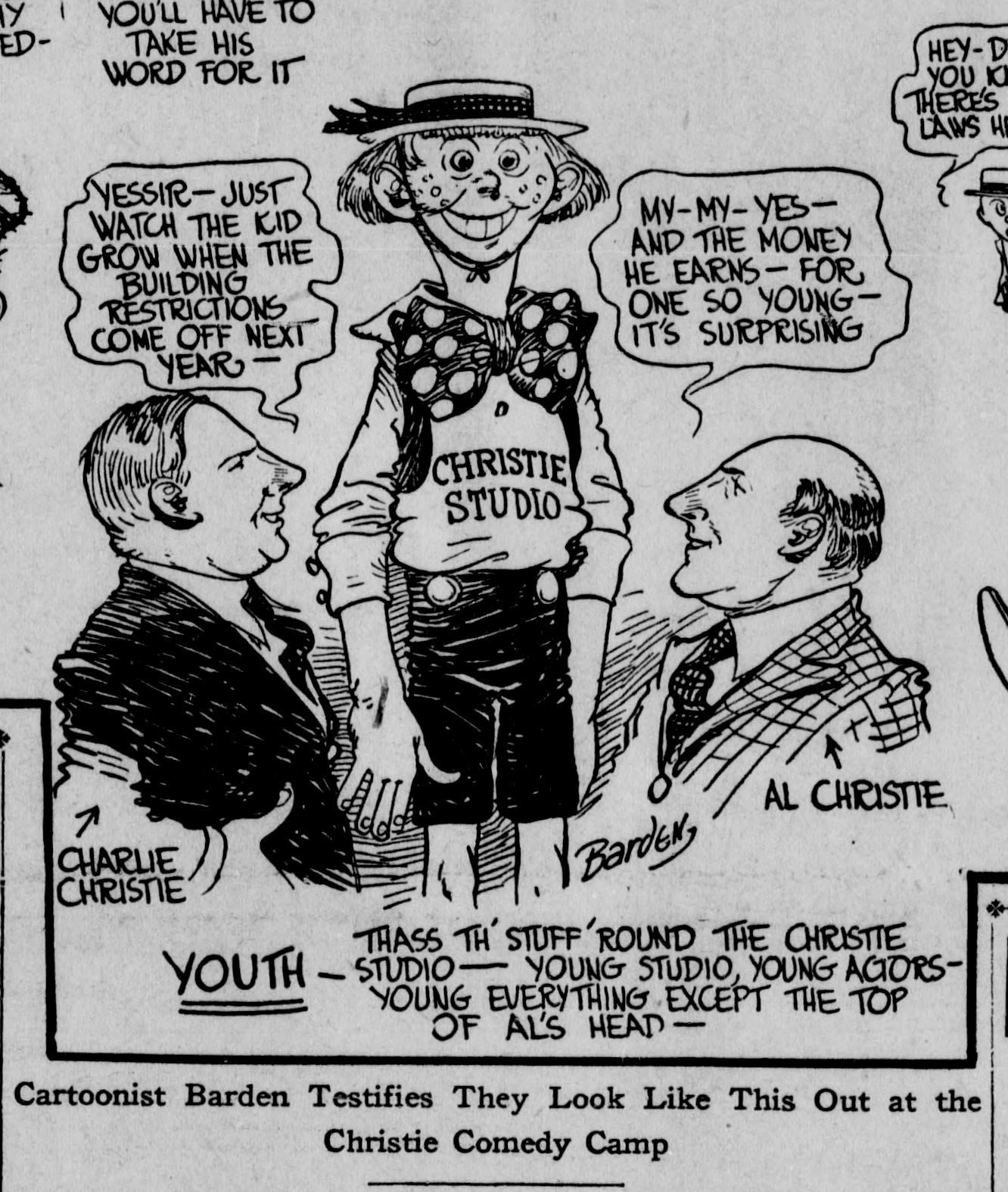
A Charlie and Al Christie caricature (Los Angeles Herald, 1919)

Al married Shirley Collins in 1911, but they later divorced. In 1925, the Christie brothers and their film company paid $31,654.43 (equivalent to $567,557 in 2024) in income taxes. Al retired after World War II and Charles retired in 1950. Al died in Beverly Hills, California on April 14, 1951, three days after suffering a heart attack. He had an estate worth only $2,597 (equivalent to $31,460 in 2024), with $1,697 in cash and $900 in personal property, and it was inherited by Charles. Charles died in Beverly Hills, on October 1, 1955; he gave his housekeeper of thirty years over $250,000 (equivalent to $2,934,472 in 2024) along with his house. She died in a car accident three months later.

== Works cited ==
- Foster, Charles (2000). Stardust and Shadows: Canadians in Early Hollywood. Dundurn Press. ISBN 1550023489.
- Mitchell, Glenn (1998). A-Z of Silent Film Comedy. Batsford Books. ISBN 0713479396.
- Miller, Blair (1995). American Silent Film Comedies: An Illustrated Encyclopedia of Persons, Studios and Terminology. McFarland & Company. ISBN 0899509290.
- Bushnell, Brooks (1993). Directors and Their Films: A Comprehensive Reference, 1895-1990. McFarland & Company. ISBN 0899507662.
- Dowling, Pat (October 9, 1920). "Christie Celebrates Fourth Anniversary". Exhibitors Herald.
- Motion Pictures: 1912-1939. Library of Congress. 1951. LCCN 51-60018.
- "Film Follies". Film Follies.
- Bernard, Bert (1927). "Everybody Calls Him Al". The Motion Picture Director of Hollywood.
