= The Right Man (disambiguation) =

The Right Man is a 1925 American silent drama film.

The Right Man may also refer to:

- The Right Man, a novel by June Boland
- The Right Man, a novel by Marie Ferrarella
- The Right Man, a novel by Nigel Planer
- The Right Man, a play by Sophie Treadwell
- "The Right Man", a song by Christina Aguilera from Back to Basics
- "The Right Man", a song by The Units
- The Right Man: The Surprise Presidency of George W. Bush, a book by David Frum
- The Right Man a 1960 TV movie starring John Alexander
