= The Soul's Cycle =

1916 film by Ulysses Davis

- Directed by: Ulysses Davis
- Written by: Theodosia Harris
- Produced by: David Horsley
- Starring: Patricia Palmer; John Oaker
- Distributed by: Mutual Picture Corp.
- Release date: 1916
- Country: United States
- Languages: Silent; English intertitles

The Soul's Cycle is a dramatic film, directed by Ulysses Davis and released in 1916.

A fragment of the film survives, held by the Library of Congress.

== Plot ==
Nadia, the daughter of a nobleman, rejects ancient Greece's senator Theron's love; so he has her and her lover, Lucian thrown into a burning crater. As punishment for this sin, the gods decree that he will roam the earth as a lion until he can right his wrong. A few millennia later, Nadia is now Agnes, the daughter of a millionaire, and Lucian is Arthur, a Wall Street broker.

== Cast ==
- Patricia Palmer
- John Oaker
- George Clair
- George Stanley
- Roy Watson
