= Goldie Colwell =

American actress (1889–1982)

- Born: Goldie Frances Colwell; January 29, 1889; Tecumseh, Kansas, USA
- Died: July 27, 1982 (aged 93); Los Angeles, California, USA
- Occupation: Actress
- Spouses: George Diegel; Kenneth Harrell
- Relatives: Vivien Fay (niece)

Goldie Colwell(1889-1982) was an American film actress and journalist who starred in more than 80 films during Hollywood's silent era. She was Tom Mix's leading lady in many Selig westerns.

== Biography ==
Colwell was born in Tecumseh, Kansas, to John Colwell and Celia Pearson. The family eventually relocated to Los Angeles, where Goldie began working as an actress around 1911; her first credited role was in Joseph A. Golden and Tom Mix's Why the Sheriff Is a Bachelor.

She was employed at Selig as Tom Mix's leading lady in dozens of westerns before heading to David Horsley's Centaur Film Company, where she continued to take on starring roles.

After retiring from acting around 1919, she became a magazine editor, heading up a new publication called The Spotlight. She also wrote for The Pomona Bulletin and The Santa Ana Daily News.

After her first husband, George Diegel, died in 1933, she married Kenneth Harrell in 1935. Her niece, Vivien Fay, was an actress, dancer, and sculptor.

== Select filmography ==
Tom Mix, Colwell and Leo D. Maloney in The Telltale Knife (1914)

Sage Brush Tom (1915)

- Our Lady of the Pearls (1912)
- The Adventures of Kathlyn (1913)
- The Cruel Crown (1914)
- Carmelita's Revenge (1914)
- Why the Sheriff Is a Bachelor (1914)
- The Ranger's Romance (1914)
- The Scapegoat (1914)
- Cactus Jake, Heart-Breaker (1914)
- The Telltale Knife (1914)
- Sage Brush Tom (1915)
- Ma's Girls (1915)
- He's in Again (1915)
- The Knockout (1915)
- The Treasure Box (1915)
- The Oriental Spasm (1915)
- A Change of Luck (1915)
- Taking a Chance (1915)
- The Little Detective (1915)
- When Avarice Rules (1915)
- The Adventures of Kathlyn (1916)
- The Yaqui (1916)
- The Heart of Texas Ryan (1917)
- Jerry and the Vampire (1917)
- Code of the Yukon (1918)
- The Railroader (1919)
