= Jerry and the Vampire =

- Directed by: Milton J. Fahrney
- Produced by: David Horsley
- Starring: George Ovey; Goldie Colwell
- Distributed by: Mutual Film Corporation
- Release date: November 3, 1917
- Running time: 1 reel
- Country: USA
- Languages: Silent; English titles

Jerry and the Vampire is a 1917 silent short comedy film produced by David Horsley and starring George Ovey. It was directed by Milton J. Fahrney and a part of Horsley's Cub Comedies.

== Cast ==
- George Ovey as Jerry
- Goldie Colwell as Bada Tara, The Vampire
- Roy Watson as The Villain
- George George as
- Janet Sully as
