= A Little Madonna =

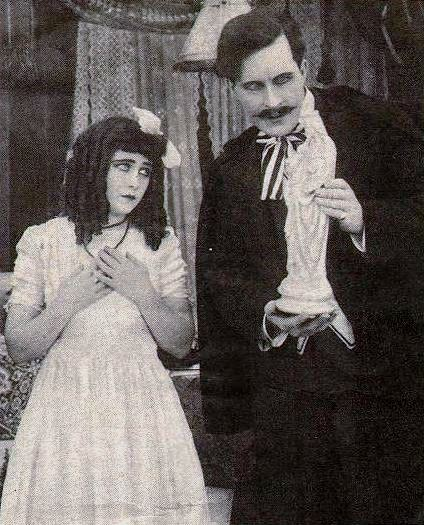
- Film still with Palmer and Taylor
- Directed by: Ulysses Davis
- Written by: William Pigott
- Starring: Charles Bennett
- Distributed by: Vitagraph Company of America; General Film Company
- Release date: April 23, 1914
- Running time: 1 reels (approximately 10 minutes)
- Country: United States
- Language: Silent (English intertitles)

A Little Madonna is a 1914 American silent drama film, directed by Ulysses Davis.

== Cast ==
- William Desmond Taylor
- Patricia Palmer
- Charles Bennett
- Jane Novak
- Loyola O'Connor
- Anne Schaefer
