= The Money Corral =

1919 film by William S. Hart

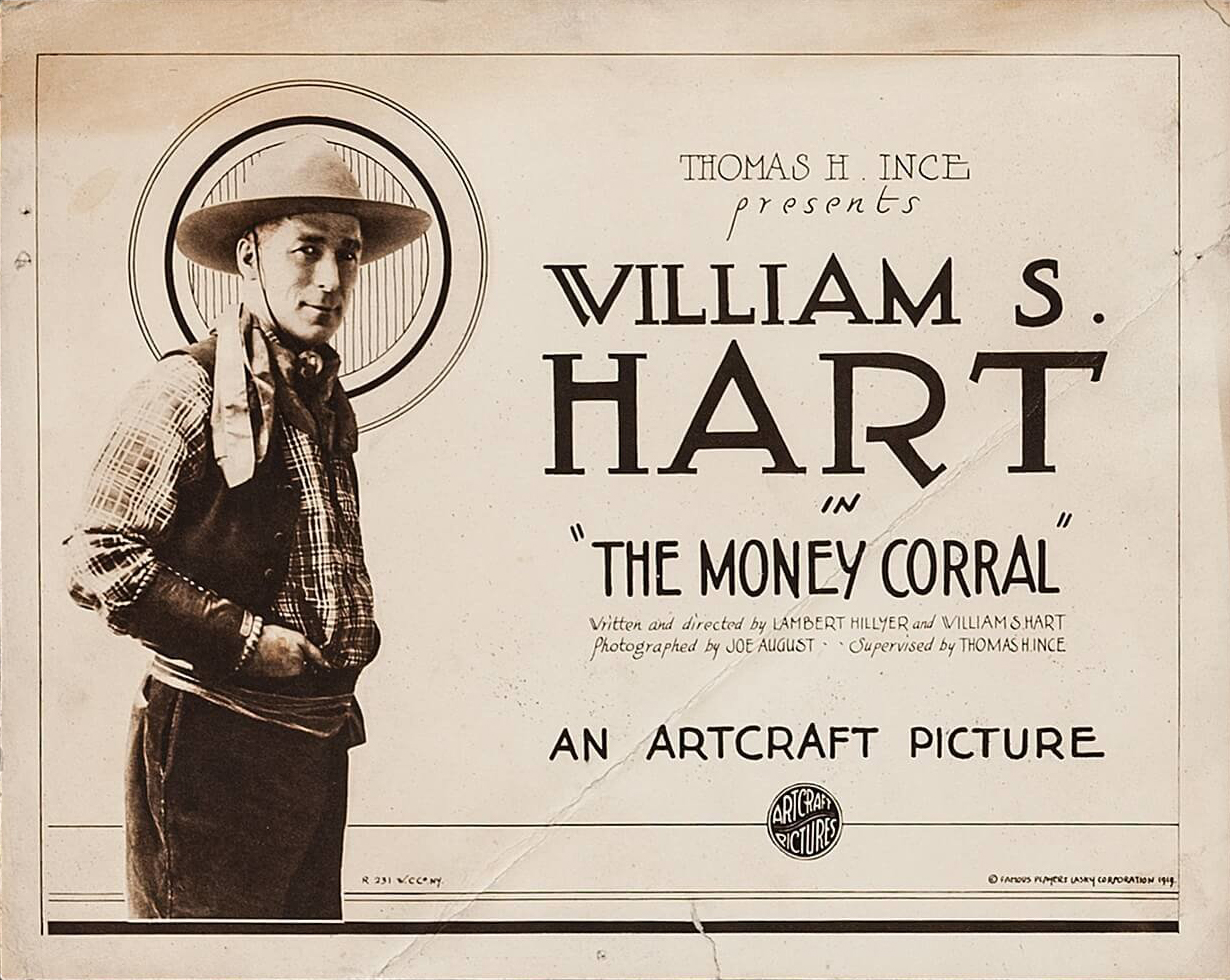
- Lobby card
- Directed by: Lambert Hillyer
- Screenplay by: William S. Hart; Lambert Hillyer
- Produced by: William S. Hart
- Starring: William S. Hart; Jane Novak; Herschel Mayall; Winter Hall; Rhea Mitchell; Patricia Palmer
- Cinematography: Joseph H. August
- Production company: William S. Hart Productions
- Distributed by: Paramount Pictures
- Release date: April 20, 1919
- Running time: 50 minutes
- Country: United States
- Language: Silent (English intertitles)

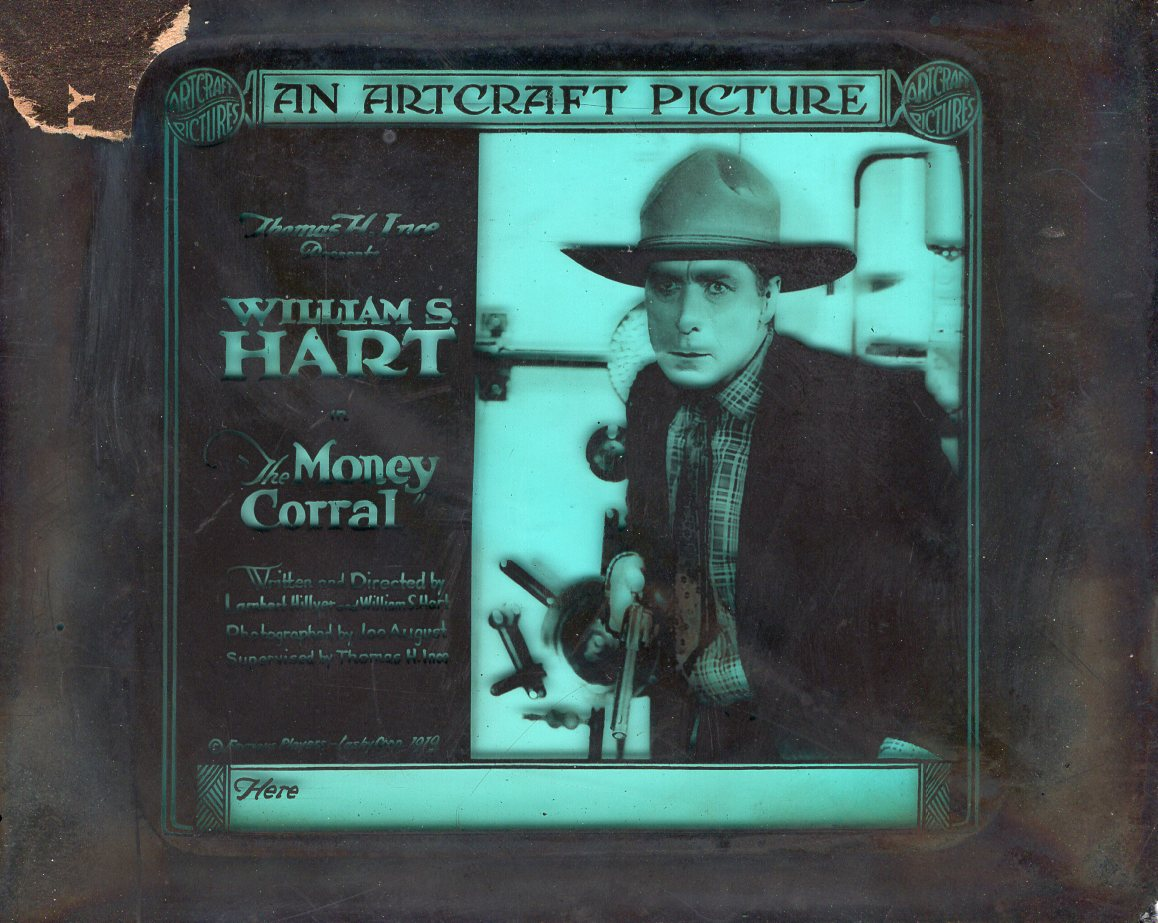

The Money Corral is a 1919 American silent adventure film directed by Lambert Hillyer and written by William S. Hart and Lambert Hillyer. The film stars William S. Hart, Jane Novak, Herschel Mayall, Winter Hall, Rhea Mitchell, and Patricia Palmer. The film was released on April 20, 1919, by Paramount Pictures. It is not known whether the film currently survives, and it may be a lost film.

== Plot ==
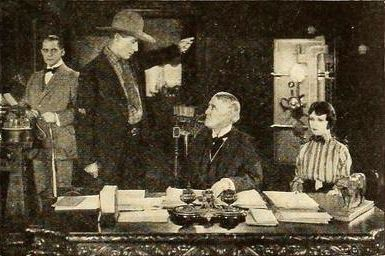
Herschel Mayall, William S. Hart, Winter Hall and Rhea Mitchell in The Money Corral

As described in a film magazine, following his performance at a Montana rodeo, cowboy Lem Beason accepts the invitation of Chicago banker Gregory Collins to come to the city and take a position of watchman at the bank, recent robberies having resulted in the death of the last two watchmen. Carl Bruner. Collins' trusted lieutenant, is the instigator of the thefts and sends Beason to the underworld on a false clue, planning his quiet murder. However, Beason comes out unscathed and convinced of Bruner's duplicity. Collins's petted daughter Janet parades the westerner for the benefit of a gay house party, and Rose, a poor relation, aids Beason in his escape. He resigns his bank job, but stays in town one more night, knowing that there will be another attempted theft at the bank. He captures Bruner and his aides and exposes them to Collins. Collins buys Beason a ranch in the west and he convinces Rose to share it with him.

== Cast ==
- William S. Hart as Lem Beason
- Jane Novak as Rose
- Herschel Mayall as Carl Bruner
- Winter Hall as Gregory Collins
- Rhea Mitchell as Janet Collins
- Patricia Palmer as Chicago Kate
