= The Kiss (1914 film) =

- Directed by: Ulysses Davis
- Written by: Marc Edmund Jones (story)
- Starring: Margaret Gibson; George Holt; William Desmond Taylor; Myrtle Gonzalez
- Release date: April 15, 1914
- Running time: 10 minutes
- Country: United States
- Languages: Silent film (English intertitles)

The Kiss is a 1914 Vitagraph silent drama short motion picture starring Margaret Gibson, George Holt, William Desmond Taylor, and Myrtle Gonzalez.

Directed by Ulysses Davis, the screenplay was based on a story by Marc Edmund Jones. Long thought to have been a lost film, a copy was found and put on YouTube. The film is the only known surviving film in which director William Desmond Taylor appears as an actor. In 1964 Taylor's co-star Margaret Gibson, shortly before her death, reportedly confessed to having murdered him in 1922.

== Cast ==
- Margaret Gibson ... Alice, a shop girl
- George Holt ... Fred, her sweetheart
- William Desmond Taylor ... George Dale, society man
- Myrtle Gonzalez ... Helen, George's fiancée
- Loyola O'Connor ... Landlady
- Jane Novak ... Mazie, a saleslady
