= Wolf Blood =

1925 film

- Directed by: George Chesebro; Bruce Mitchell
- Written by: Cliff Hill; Bennett Cohen
- Produced by: Ryan Brothers
- Starring: George Chesebro; Roy Watson; Milburn Morante; Frank Clark; Marguerite Clayton; Ray Hanford; Jack Cosgrave
- Cinematography: Lesley Selander
- Production company: Ryan Brothers Productions
- Distributed by: Lee-Bradford Corporation
- Release date: December 16, 1925
- Running time: 67 minutes
- Country: United States
- Language: Silent (English intertitles)

Wolf Blood (also known as The Wolf Man and Wolfblood: A Tale of the Forest) is an American silent 1925 werewolf film starring George Chesebro, who also co-directed it with B-serial veteran Bruce M. Mitchell.

The film has been referenced in a number of books as being the first werewolf movie ever made. This however is erroneous; the first werewolf movie is The Werewolf, a film made in 1913. However that film is considered to be lost. Therefore, Wolf Blood could be called the earliest surviving werewolf film.

Although this film is labeled as a horror, there is very little in the feature film to be qualified as a horror film. Instead the film focuses more on romance and archaic action rather than suspense and fear as we have seen in other horror films of the time. The film is said to have more in common with westerns and adventure films of the 1920s.This film's importance to the genre of horror comes more so from its historical importance rather than historical impact. Wolf Blood is available commercially as an extra on a DVD together with F.W. Murnau's The Haunted Castle.

== Plot ==
Dick Bannister is the new field boss of the Ford Logging Company, a Canadian logging-crew during a time when conflicts with the powerful Consolidated Lumber Company, a bitter rival company, have turned bloody, like a private war. His boss, Miss Edith Ford, comes to inspect the lumberjack camp, bringing her fiancé Dr. Horton with her. Dick is attacked by his rivals and left for dead. His loss of blood is so great that he needs a transfusion, but no human will volunteer, so the doctor uses a wolf as a source of the blood. Afterwards, Dick begins having dreams in which he runs with a pack of phantom wolves, and some rival loggers are killed by wolves. Soon, the news has spread through the camp and most of the lumberjacks begin to believe that Dick is a werewolf. Jules Deveroux dies violently, and Dick wonders if he did it. Dick attempts to jump off a cliff, but is rescued by Edith, who reveals that Deveroux died in a fair fight, not from Dick supposedly becoming a werewolf. Dick and Edith embrace.

== Cast ==
full film; runtime 01:07:01.

- George Chesebro as Dick Bannister
- Marguerite Clayton as Miss Edith Ford, owner of the Ford Logging Company
- Raymond "Ray" Hanford as Dr. Eugene "Gene" Horton, Edith's fiancé
- Roy Watson as Jules Deveroux, envious owner of the Consolidated Lumber Company
- Milburn Morante as Jacques Lebeq, notorious bootlegger
- Frank Clark as Old Pop Hadley, alcoholic woods guard for the Ford Logging Company
- Jack Cosgrave as Edith's uncle and manager

== Production ==
The film attempts to use modern techniques unique to horror films at the time with the use of techniques such as eye-line matches, cutaways, and continuity matching. The film also chooses to use many jump cuts and transitional dissolves. According to Neil Worcester these techniques are used very clumsily and are considered jarring or mistimed. Other notable techniques used in this film are low-key lighting, long sequences with very wide angles and stretched-out travelogue sections. There is also the use of color tint on scenes to establish night time and day time in certain scenes

== Werewolf Myth ==
Unlike its famous counterparts vampires, ghosts, and witches, werewolves were only known through old folktales and stories. Because of this George Chesebro was able to use this lack of knowledge at the time to experiment with the myths and legends of werewolves in the later part of the film. Unlike later werewolf movies we know today, this film does not mention any of the modern tropes such as transforming on a full moon. The “werewolf” depicted in this film is not a man transforming into a wolf or wolfman but rather a man changing into a very violent man. Although this film is considered the earliest surviving werewolf film this film would have no impact on later films such as Universal Studios 1935 film Werewolf of London & Universal's 1941 film The Wolf Man.

== Criticism ==
Many people criticize the film for not truly embodying the genre of horror due to its lack of scare factor and lack of anything actually supernatural. According to Neil Worcester many of the film's cinematography techniques are considered unappealing and jarring. Watchers of the film also criticize the use of romance and drama because they believe it takes away from the original purpose of the film. The initial reception of the film is unknown however this film was George Chesebro's first and only directing role before he became a full time actor.

In his "modern" assessment of Wolf Blood in the 2016 reference Tome of Terror: Horror Films of the Silent Era, film critic Troy Howarth describes its pace as sluggish and overall style a disappointment:

The film spends an eternity dwelling on its old-fashioned romantic scenario before even beginning to toy with the notion of a man turning into a wolf. Even more disappointing, no actual transformation ever occurs. The filmmaking is crude and antiquated, even for its time.
