= Champion Film Company =

Early American film company, a predecessor to Universal Pictures

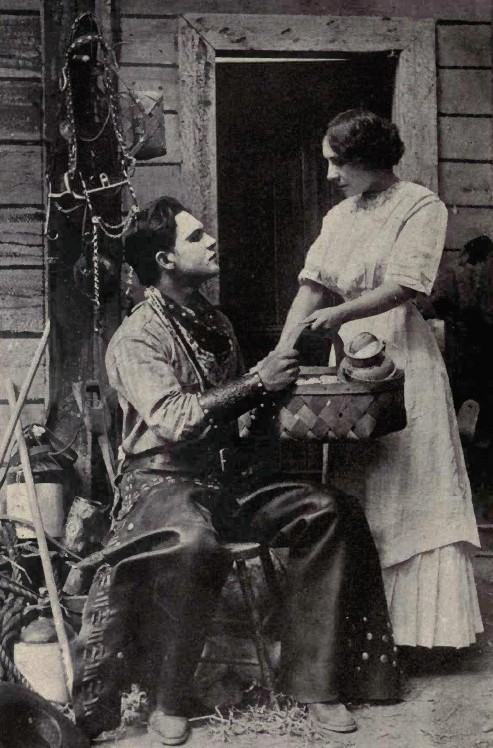
- Movie still from How He Redeemed Himself
- Industry: Film
- Founded: 1909
- Founders: Mark M. Dintenfass
- Headquarters: Coytesville, New Jersey, United States
- Products: Motion pictures

The Champion Film Company was an independent production company founded in 1909 by Mark M. Dintenfass. The studio was one of the film companies that merged to form Universal Pictures.

Champion was the first film production company to establish itself in the area around Fort Lee, New Jersey, when the town was the home of America's first motion picture industry It built its studio in the vicinity of Fort Lee, at the town line with Englewood Cliffs in Coytesville, then a relatively remote area, to make them look as little like a studio as possible. The building was demolished on 2013.

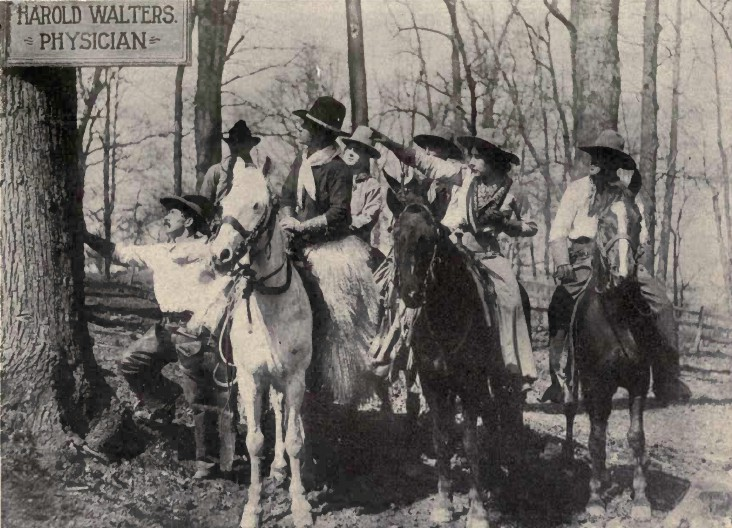
Movie still from In the Great Big West

Dintenfass tried avoid the investigators of Thomas Alva Edison, always looking for the "pirates" who escaped the rigid conditions posed by the Motion Picture Patents Company (MPPC), the monopoly of the sector that it imposed, between the other, to use only the technical material (film cameras, film, etc.) that was to be provided exclusively by the trust. To circumvent the MPPC, the independents - including Dintenfass - distributed their films through the Motion Picture Distributing and Sales Company of Carl Laemmle.

On April 30, 1912, Laemmle brought together Pat Powers of Powers Motion Picture Company, Mark Dintenfass of Champion Film Company, William Swanson of Rex Motion Picture Company, David Horsley of Nestor Film Company, and Charles Baumann and Adam Kessel of the New York Motion Picture Company, to merge their companies with Independent Moving Pictures and create Universal Film Manufacturing Company, with Laemmle assuming the role of president. Dintenfass later founded the Vim Comedy Company (1915)

In its four years of activity, Champion produced more than two hundred films. It specialized initially in westerns and historical reconstructions of military episodes of the American Civil War and American Revolution. Later, he produced numerous drama films, documentaries and some movies related to famous people, such as the aviators Blanche Scott and Robert G. Fowler. Among those who appeared in Champion films were John G. Adolfi, Irving Cummings, Jeanie Macpherson.

== Filmography ==
- Abernathy Kids to the Rescue, directed by Travers Vale (1910)
- A Romance of an Anvil (1910)
- Cow-boy and the Squaw (1910)
- The Spitfire (1910)
- The Hermit of the Rockies (1910)
- A Cowboy's Pledge (1910)
- The Sheriff and his Son (1910)
- Cowboy and the Easterner (1910)
- His Indian Bride (1910)
- A Wild Goose Chase (1910)
- The White Princess of the Tribe (1910)
- A Western Girl's Sacrifice (1910)
- The Cowboys to the Rescue (1910)
- How the Tenderfoot Made Good (1910)
- Stolen by Indians (1910)
- Doings at the Ranch (1910)
- Caught by Cowboys (1910)
- The Ranchman and the Miser (1910)
- The Way of the West (1910)
- Let Us Give Thanks (1910)
- The Indian Land Grab (1910)
- Hearts of the West (1910)
- The Sheriff and the Detective (1910)
- His Mother (1910)
- The Golden Gates (1910)
- Days of the Early West (1910)
- Bill's Widow (1911)
- The Will of a Western Maid (1911)
- Why He Went West (1911)
- Judged by Higher Power (1911)
- At Double Trouble Ranch (1911)
- Her Three Proposals (1911)
- The Old Man and Jim, directed by Ulysses Davis (1911)
- A Western Girl's Choice (1911)
- The Vindication of John (1911)
- The Girl and the Oath (1911)
- The Pay-Roll (1911)
- The Bachelor's Old Maid (1911)
- The Price He Paid (1911)
- Men of the West (1911)
- With Stonewall Jackson (1911)
- A Half-Breed's Courage (1911)
- Gen. Meade's Fighting Days (1911)
- She Wanted a Man with Brains (1911)
- Clark's Capture of Kaskaskia (1911)
- Out of the Dark, directed by Ulysses Davis (1911)
- Col. E.D. Baker, 1st California (1911)
- Making a Man of His Son (1911)
- Gen. Marion, the Swamp Fox (1911)
- Circle C's New Boss (1911)
- With Sheridan at Murfreesboro (1911)
- In the Great Big West (1911)
- The Peril of Diaz (1911)
- How He Redeemed Himself (1911)
- Service Under Johnston and Lee (1911)
- The Cost of Drink (1911)
- Longstreet at Seven Pines (1911)
- His Last Crooked Deal (1911)
- Molly Pitcher, directed by Ulysses Davis (1911)
- For Her Sin (1911)
- War and the Widow (1911)
- The Boy Scouts to the Rescue (1911)
- The Fighting Rev. Caldwell, directed by Ulysses Davis (1911)
- A Cowboy and a Lord (1911)
- From Wallace to Grant (1911)
- Tony Would Be a Cowboy (1911)
- A Southern Girl's Heroism (1911)
- A Daring Deed (1911)
- The Exchange (1911)
- At the Trail's End (1911)
- The Perils of a War Messenger (1911)
- The Dubuque Regatta (1911)
- Dewey (1911)
- Chief Fire Eye's Game (1911)
- The Three Calls (1911)
- How the Girls Got Even (1911)
- When North and South Met (1911)
- The Confessional (1911)
- A Daughter of Dixie (1911)
- How Tony Became a Hero (1911)
- Grant and Lincoln (1911)
- When the Law Came (1911)
- Charley's Buttle (1911)
- The Red Devils, directed by Sidney Drew (1911)
- Shenandoah (1911)
- The Stolen Horse (1911)
- The Black Horse Troop of Culver (1911)
- The Cook of the Ranch (1911)
- Barbara Frietchie (1911)
- As Things Used to Be (1911)
- The National Guard Encampment at Fort Riley (1911)
- What the Indians Did (1911)
- A Girl and a Spy (1911)
- Circumstantial Evidence (1911)
- The Copperhead, directed by Ulysses Davis (1911)
- Law or the Lady (1911)
- The Cowboys' Pies (1911)
- Folks of Old Virginia (1911)
- The Moonshiner's Trail (1911)
- The Redemption of a Coward (1911)
- The Passing of Sal (1911)
- National Guardsmen and Regulars at Fort Riley, Kansas (1911)
- When the Sheriff Got His Man (1911)
- The Mother Goose Series (1911)
- The Two Browns (1911)
- Field Day Sports at Ft. Riley, Kansas (1911)
- Yankee Doodle (1911)
- Our Navy (1911)
- The Indian Fortune Teller (1911)
- A Traitor on the Staff (1911)
- The Saving of Dan, directed by Ulysses Davis (1911)
- The Coward's Flute, directed byUlysses Davis (1911)
- By Decree of Fate (1911)
- Bonnie of the Hills (1911)
- The Doctor's Close Call (1911)
- The Blood of the Poor, directed by Ulysses Davis (1912)
- The Kid of Roaring Camp (1912)
- An Aviator's Success (1912)
- Love That Never Fails, directed by Ulysses Davis (1912)
- Fathers and Sons (1912)
- A Tale of the Snow (1912)
- The Brute, directed by Ulysses Davis (1912)
- Her Brother's Partner (1912)
- Cardinal Farley's Home Coming (1912)
- How Jack Got Even with Bud (1912)
- The Aviator and the Autoist Race for a Bride (1912)
- A Divided Family, directed by Ulysses Davis (1912)
- Robert G. Fowler, Trans-Continental Aviator (1912)
- Mr. Piddle Rebels (1912)
- For Her Father's Sake, directed by Ulysses Davis (1912)
- The Merchant Mayor of Indianapolis, directed by Ulysses Davis (1912)
- A Wife's Discovery (1912)
- The Robbery at the Railroad Station (1912)
- A Higher Power (1912)
- Wrongly Accused, directed by Ulysses Davis (1912)
- The Manicurist (1912)
- Blind (1912)
- The Fatal Glass (1912)
- The Editor (1912)
- For Home and Honor (1912)
- Ireland and Israel (1912)
- A Night's Adventure (1912)
- Thou Shalt Not (?) (1912)
- Kid Canfield, directed by Ulysses Davis (1912)
- The Divorce Cure (1912)
- The Caricature of a Face (1912)
- The Blue Mountain Buffaloes (1912)
- Salvation Sue (1912)
- Baby's Adventures (1912)
- Bermuda (1912)
- A Gay Deceiver (1912)
- Brothers, directed by Wallace Reid (1912)
- Winona (1912)
- The Horse Thieves of Bar X Ranch (1912)
- An Italian Romance (1912 film) (1912)
- Realization of a Child's Dream (1912)
- Lucky Jim (1912)
- What Might Have Been (1912)
- The Duck Hunt (1912 film) (1912)
- The Cashier's Ordeal (1912)
- Mrs. Alden's Awakening, directed by Jay Hunt (1912)
- The Ranch Woman (1912)
- The Heroes of the Blue and Gray (1912)
- The Derelict (1912)
- A Squaw Man (1912)
- Camille, directed by Jay Hunt (1912)
- A Western Child's Heroism, directed by Sidney M. Goldin (1912)
- Sisters (1912)
- Pat's Breeches (1912)
- Little Old New York (1912)
- The Gypsy Bride, directed by Lawrence B. McGill (1912)
- Foraging on the Enemy (1912)
- The Call of the West (1912)
- The Poisoners (1912 film) (1912)
- What a Woman Will Do (1912)
- For His Child (1912)
- The Bum and the Bomb (1912)
- Niagara Falls (1912)
- The Foundling (1912)
- The Maid of the Rocks (1912)
- The Trysting Tree (1912)
- The Dummy Director (1912)
- Rose of the Islands (1912)
- Her Whole Duty (1912)
- To Err Is Human (1912)
- The Girl in the Gingham Gown (1912)
- Thy Will Be Done (1912)
- Sue (1912)
- A Tramp's Strategy (1912)
- A Protégé of Uncle Sam (1912)
- Blue Ridge Folks (1912)
- The Gateway to America (1912)
- Billy Jones of New York (1912)
- The Honeymooners (1912)
- Right Shall Prevail (1912)
- The Chaperones (film) (1912)
- The White Heron (1912)
- The City Boarder (1912)
- Art and Love (1913)
- Sins of the Father (1913)
- The Death Trail (1913)
- The Marked Card (1913)
- The Rich Mr. Rockamorgan (1913)
- A Daughter of Virginia (1913)
- Her Stepmother (1913)
- The Duke and the Actor (1913)
- The Bum's Halloween (1913)
- Fond Heart Saves the Day (1913)
- The Honeymoon Lodging (1913)
- A Trim and a Shave (1913)
- An Interrupted Suicide (1913)
- A Knotty Knot (1913)
- The Life-Savers of Chicamocomo (1913)
- Shanghaied (1913)
- Lena's Flirtation (1913)
- When Strong Men Meet (1913)
- Knotty, Knotty! (1913)
- The Clown Hero (1913)
- Life in Soudan (1913)
- The Shark God, directed by John Griffith Wray (1913)
- Hawaiian Love (1913), directed by John Griffith Wray
- The Leper (1913)

== Gallery ==
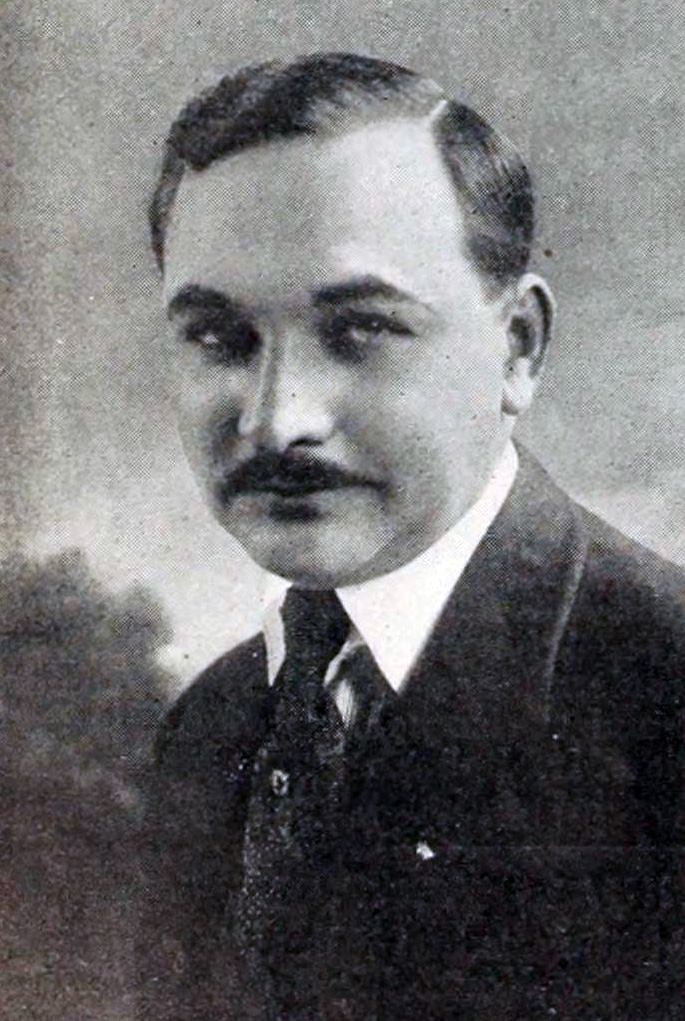
John G. Adolfi

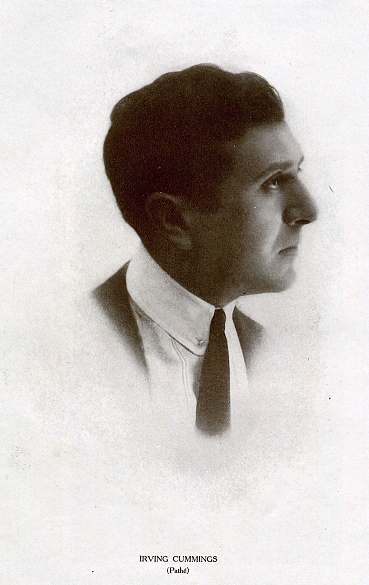
Irving Cummings

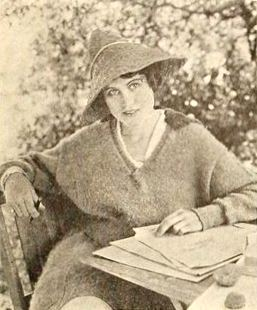
Jeanie MacPherson

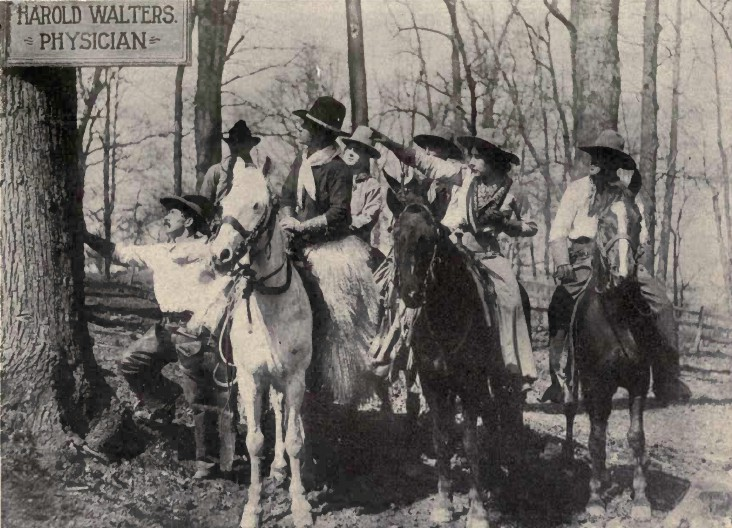
In the Great Big West (1911)

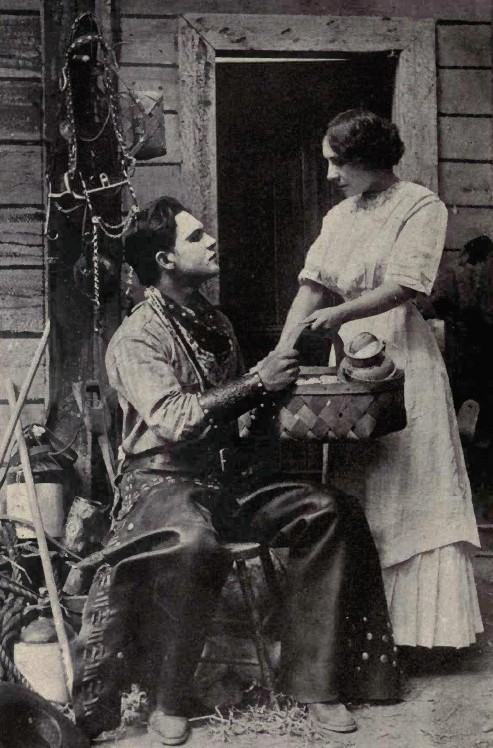
How He Redeemed Himself (1911)
