= The Prude's Fall =

1925 film

- Directed by: Graham Cutts
- Written by: Rudolph Besier (play); May Edginton (play); Alfred Hitchcock
- Produced by: Michael Balcon
- Starring: Jane Novak; Julanne Johnston; Warwick Ward
- Cinematography: Hal Young
- Production company: Balcon, Freedman & Saville
- Distributed by: Wardour Films
- Release date: November 23, 1925
- Running time: 6 reels
- Country: United Kingdom
- Language: Silent (English intertitles)

The Prude's Fall is a 1925 British silent drama film directed by Graham Cutts and starring Jane Novak, Julanne Johnston, and Warwick Ward. An incomplete print of this film exists.

The film was shot at Islington Studios, produced by a company that would soon develop into Gainsborough Pictures. It was an adaptation of a play by Rudolph Besier and May Edington with the screenplay written by Alfred Hitchcock. Its German title is Seine zweite Frau. It was also known by the alternative title of Dangerous Virtue.

== Plot ==
As described in a film magazine review, Beatrice Audley breaks her engagement with Captain le Briquet and he marries her acquaintance Sonia Roubetsky. Sonia and her friend Laura Westonry previously had admitted to Beatrice that they were both women with a "past." Fearing to spoil their happiness, Sonia withholds Sonia's confession of her past from the Captain. When he learns of this, he believes Beatrice did this to wreck his life. Sonia commits suicide and the Captain devises an unpleasant revenge scheme against the woman he believes tricked him. The Captain goes about his plan of making Beatrice love him, which comes to the point where she is ready to give herself to the man she loves when he suggests an arrangement omitting the marriage ceremony. His plan then is to afterwards cast her off. However, he discovers that Beatrice had acted in a spirit of sacrifice, and the Captain and Beatrice have a wedding.

== Cast ==
- Jane Novak as Beatrice Audley
- Julanne Johnston as Sonia Roubetsky
- Warwick Ward as Andre le Briquet
- Hugh Miller as Marquis de Rocqueville
- Gladys Jennings as Laura Westonry
- Miles Mander as Sir Neville Moreton
- Henry Vibart as Dean Carey
- Marie Ault as Mrs Masters

uncredited

- Betty Compson

== Reception ==
It was not very well regarded. Iris Barry's review in the Daily Mail ran as follows: "An English picture, not of first-rate quality, but with an interesting cast." A review in the American Film Daily complained that "the story has been put together in a haphazard fashion with the various sequences happening along in a disjointed manner that fails to keep the interest centered in any one character or situation."

== Bibliography ==
- Chapman, Gary. London's Hollywood: The Gainsborough Studio in the Silent Years. Edditt, 2014.
- Maurice Yacowar & Barry Keith Grant. Hitchcock's British Films. Wayne State University Press, 2010.
