= Restless Youth =

1928 film directed by Christy Cabanne

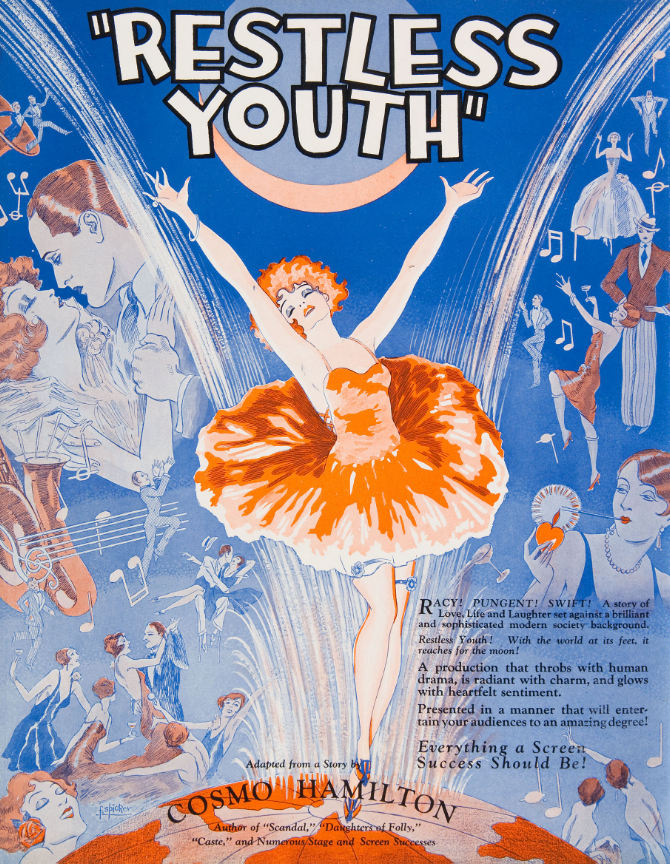
- Directed by: Christy Cabanne
- Screenplay by: Howard J. Green
- Based on: "Restless Youth" by Cosmo Hamilton
- Produced by: Jack Cohn
- Starring: Marceline Day; Ralph Forbes; Norman Trevor
- Cinematography: Joe Walker
- Edited by: Ben Pivar
- Production company: Columbia Pictures
- Release date: November 30, 1928 (US)
- Running time: 6 reels
- Country: United States
- Language: English

Restless Youth is a 1928 silent American melodrama film, directed by Christy Cabanne. It stars Marceline Day, Ralph Forbes, and Norman Trevor. The film was released in the United States by Columbia Pictures on November 30, 1928.

The film was an adaptation by Howard J. Green based on a short story of the same name by Cosmo Hamilton.

== Cast ==
- Marceline Day as Dixie Calhoun
- Ralph Forbes as Bruce Neil
- Norman Trevor as John Neil
- Robert Ellis as Robert Haines
- Mary Mabery as Susan
- Wild Bill Elliott as George Baxter
- Roy Watson

== Critical reception ==
A review in Harrison's Reports commented that after a "not so pleasing" start, the film became powerful. Day's performance was described as "excellent work", and the reviewer called Forbes "good as the hero".

== Preservation ==
Restless Youth is currently presumed lost. In February of 2021, the film was cited by the National Film Preservation Board on their Lost U.S. Silent Feature Films list.
