= Roy Watson (actor) =

American actor (1876?–1937)

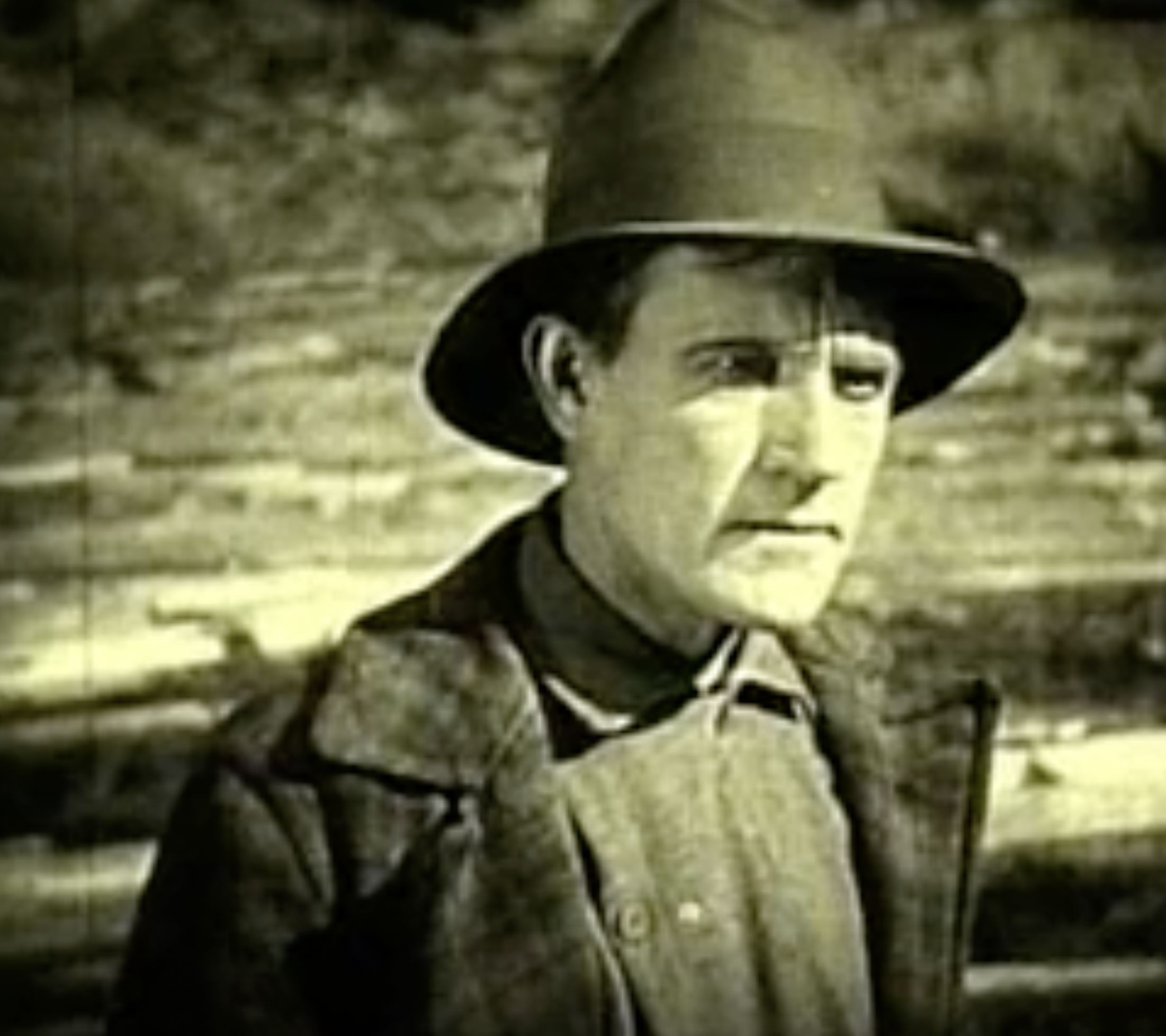
- Roy Watson in a still from Wolf Blood
- Born: August 6, 1876; Richmond, Virginia
- Died: June 7, 1937 (aged 60); Hollywood, California
- Occupation: Actor
- Years active: 1911-1935
- Spouse: Jane Keckley

Roy Watson (August 6, 1876 – June 7, 1937) was an American actor of the silent era. He appeared in more than 120 films between 1911 and 1935.

== Biography ==
Born in Richmond, Virginia, Watson began to act on stage in 1895. He went to Hollywood in 1909. Watson's first work with films was with the Selig Company when he appeared in The Hazards of Helen.

Watson was married to, and divorced from actress Jane Keckley. He lived at the McCadden Hotel before moving to a rest home. He died at the Hollywood Hospital in Hollywood, California, on June 7, 1937.

== Selected filmography ==
- The Count of Monte Cristo (1912)
- The Adventures of Kathlyn (1913)
- The Livid Flame (1914)
- Why the Sheriff Is a Bachelor (1914)
- The Hazards of Helen (1914)
- The Soul's Cycle (1916)
- Jerry and the Vampire (1917)
- Cupid's Round Up (1918)
- The Trail of the Holdup Man (1919)
- Wolf Blood (1925)
- Chasing Trouble (1926)
- Speeding Hoofs (1927)
- Restless Youth (1928)
- The House of Terror (1928) a 10-chapter serial, today considered lost
