= The Telltale Knife =

1914 film

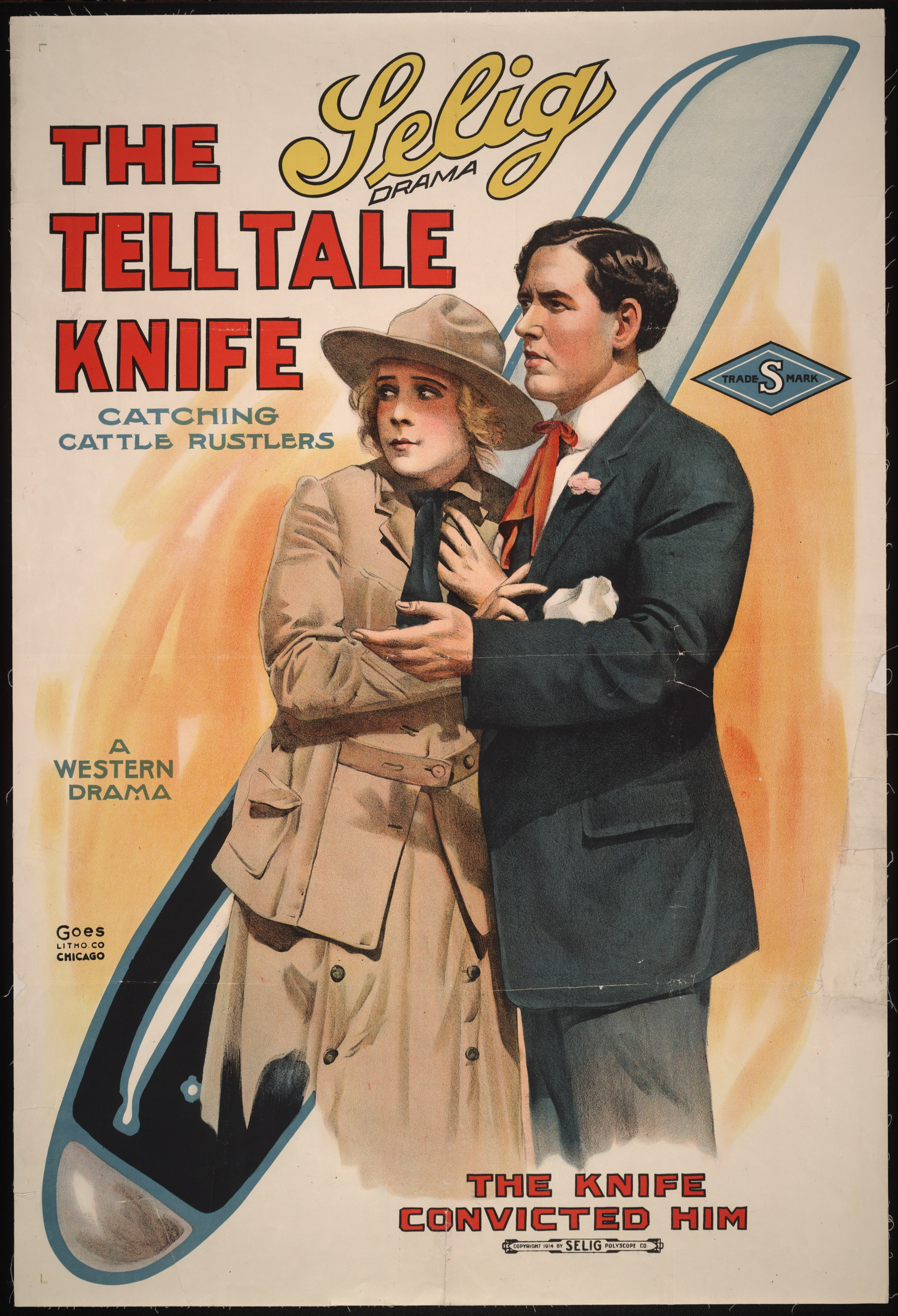
- Theatrical release poster
- Directed by: Tom Mix
- Produced by: Tom Mix
- Starring: Tom Mix
- Production company: Selig Polyscope Company
- Release date: November 3, 1914
- Running time: 10 minutes
- Country: United States
- Languages: Silent; English intertitles

The Telltale Knife is a 1914 American short silent Western film starring Tom Mix. Mix also produced and directed the film for the Selig Polyscope Company.

== Plot ==
Trade advertisement for The Telltale Knife (1914), in the files of the Library of Congress

This summary of the plot was published in The Moving Picture World for November 7, 1914:

Mabel Madden, a typical western girl, thrown upon her own resources, inherits a saloon from her father. She is somewhat infatuated with Tom Mason, against whom suspicions have been aroused of rustling cattle from the neighboring ranchmen. But she is also a great admirer of the intrepid sheriff, who posts in her bar-room an offer of a reward of $500 for the capture of the cattle rustlers.

Tom Mason is really a rustler and with his band makes depredations until one day two of them have a narrow escape from being caught In the act of branding a steer. Mabel has presented Tom with a knife, which he leaves behind when he runs away from the approaching range rider, who discovers them. The range rider gives the knife to the sheriff, who identifies Tom thereby. A pistol fight follows. Tom and his gang escape temporarily, only to be wiped out by the sheriff and his posse. It Is a most vivid picture with a lot of shooting, real fighting, hard riding and love making. The sheriff wins Mabel and announces the saloon for sale.

== Cast ==
- Tom Mix as Tom Mason
- Goldie Colwell as Mabel Madden
- Harry Loverin as Tip
- Leo D. Maloney as the Sheriff
- Hoot Gibson

== See also ==
- Tom Mix filmography
