= Rounding Up the Law =

1922 film

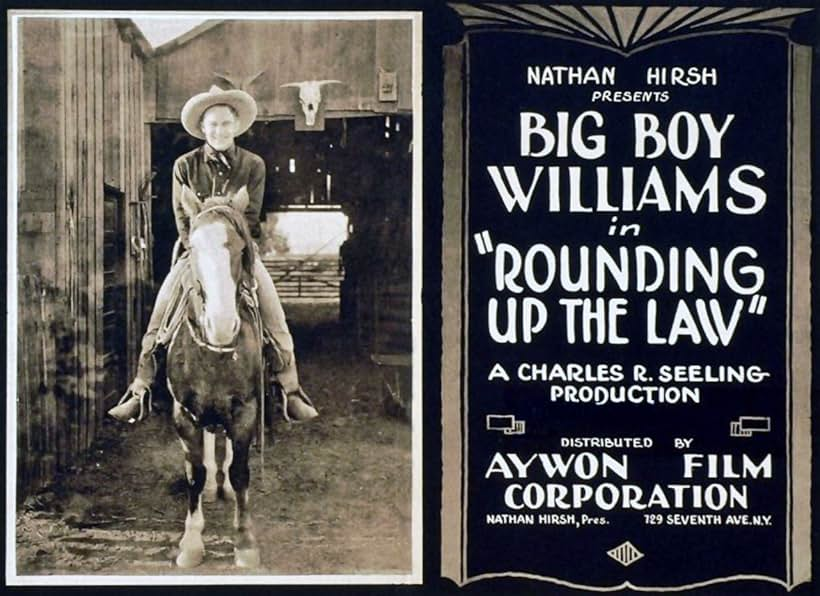
- Directed by: Charles R. Seeling
- Written by: W.H. Allen; Jack Natteford
- Produced by: Charles R. Seeling
- Cinematography: Charles R. Seeling
- Edited by: George Martin
- Production company: Charles R. Seeling Productions
- Distributed by: Aywon Film; Grapevine Video
- Release date: 15 April 1922 (location)

Rounding Up the Law is a 1922 American silent Western film directed by Charles R. Seeling and starring Guinn 'Big Boy' Williams, Russell Gordon and Chet Ryan.

The film is preserved by the Library of Congress.

== Synopsis ==
Larry Connell arrives in a border town run by Sheriff Bull Weyman and Branch Doughty. Connell wins the sheriff's ranch at draw poker, but Weyman uses his influence with Judge Hyland to have Larry declared bankrupt. Larry attempts to fight foul with fair, but the sale of his cattle pushes him over the edge. Larry holds up Doughty and subsequently gets arrested, but escapes, intending to blow up the sheriff's office.

== Cast ==
- Guinn 'Big Boy' Williams - Larry Connell
- Patricia Palmer - Doris Hyland
- Chet Ryan- John 'Bull' Weyman
- Russell Gordon - 'Branch' Doughty
- William McCall- Judge Marcus Hyland

== DVD release ==
Rounding Up The Law was released on Region 0 DVD-R by Alpha Video on July 7, 2015.
