= Milton J. Fahrney =

American film director

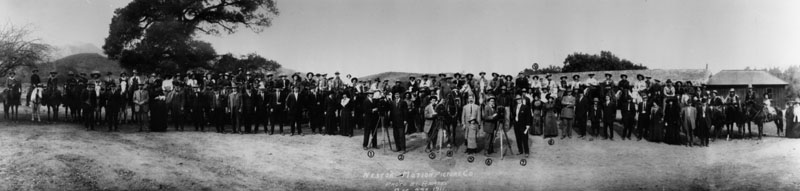
Photographed among Nestor Film Company players

Milton J. Fahrney, sometimes credited as Milton H. Fahrney or simply Milton Fahrney, was an actor and director during the silent film era.

He worked for Albuquerque Film Manufacturing Company and Nestor Film Company.

He featured comedian George Ovey in films.

He married Alexandra Phillips, a screenwriter.

He directed the Cub Comedies. He engaged Louise Horner to play a role in the Jerry series. Fahrney wrote and directed dozens of shorts for the series.

== Filmography ==
=== Director ===
- The Pilgrim (1910)
- The Law of the Range (1911 film)
- His Only Son (1912)
- White Cloud's Secret(1912), extant at EYE collection in Netherlands
- The Little Hero (1915)
- The Little Detective (1915), a Cub Comedies
- Jerry's Big Game (1916)
- Jerry and the Smugglers (1916)
- Jerry in the Movies (1916)
- Holding His Own (1917), extant
- The Hero of the E.Z. Ranch
- Jerry and the Bandits
- Jerry and the Vampire (1917)

=== Actor ===
- Yankee Speed (1924)
- The Right Man (1925)
- In the First Degree (1927)
- Stepping on the Gas (1927)
