= Why the Sheriff Is a Bachelor =

1914 film

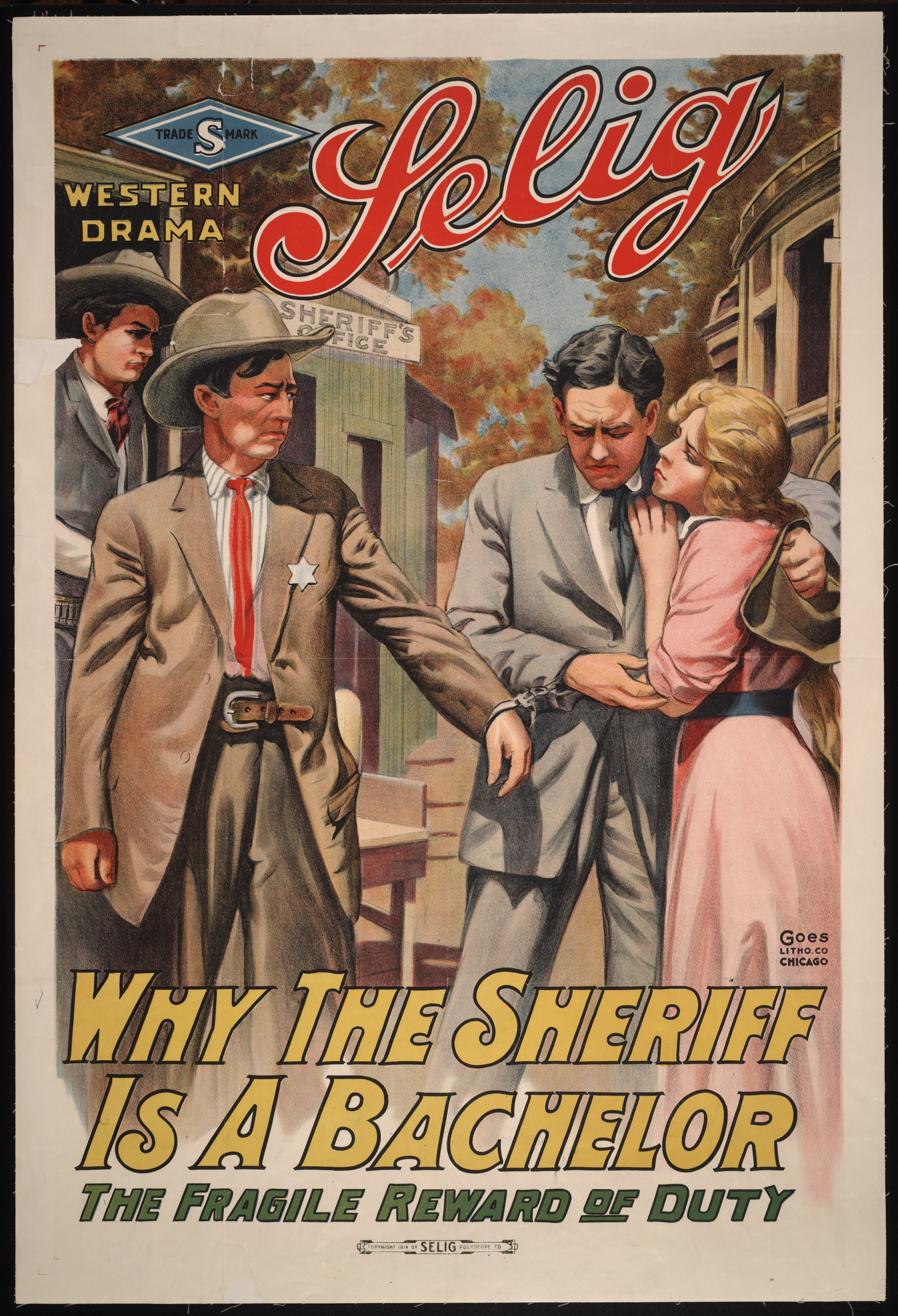
- Theatrical release poster
- Directed by: Joseph A. Golden; Tom Mix
- Written by: Joseph A. Golden
- Produced by: William N. Selig; Selig Polyscope Company
- Starring: Tom Mix
- Distributed by: General Film Company
- Release date: October 27, 1914
- Running time: 1 reel
- Country: United States
- Languages: Silent; English intertitles

Why the Sheriff Is a Bachelor (sub-titled The Fragile Reward of Duty) is a 1914 American short silent Western film produced by Selig Polyscope Company and written by Joseph A. Golden who co-directed with the star Tom Mix. It is a remake of the 1911 film of the same title in which Mix also starred. The 1914 version is held at the Library of Congress.

== Cast ==
- Tom Mix – The Sheriff
- Goldie Colwell – Alice
- Leo D. Maloney – Alice's Brother
- Roy Watson – Roy Watson

== See also ==
- Tom Mix filmography
