= George Ovey =

American actor

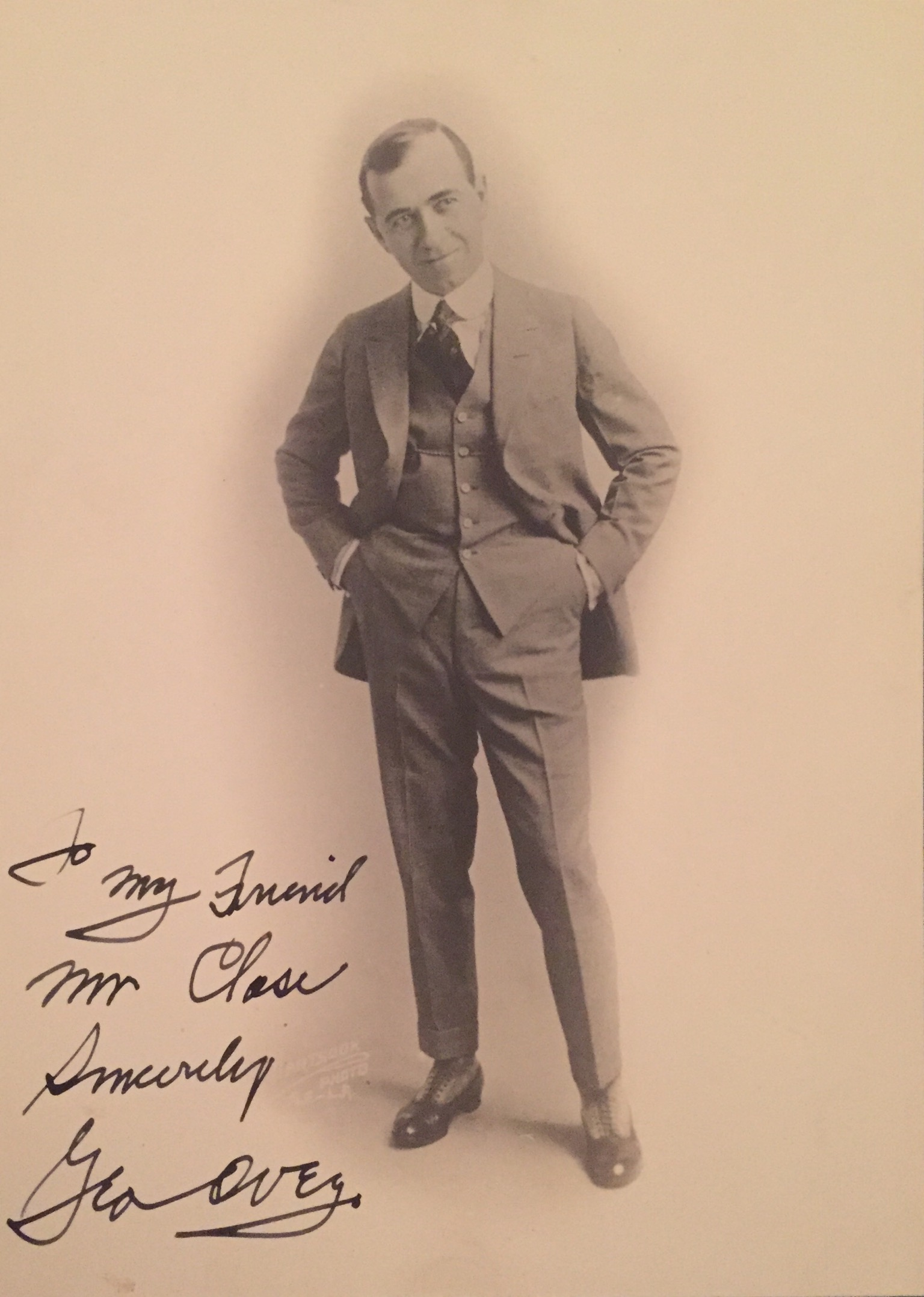
- Photo Inscribed To Friend
- Born: December 13, 1870; Trenton, Missouri, US
- Died: December 23, 1951 (aged 81); Hollywood, California, US
- Occupation: Actor
- Years active: 1915–1951
- Spouse: Louise Horner

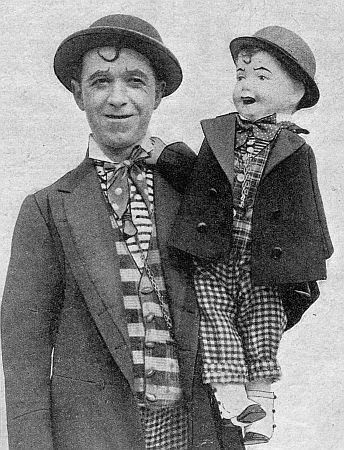
"Merry Jerry": Cub Comedies, c. 1916

George Overton O’Dell, known as George Ovey professionally (December 13, 1870 – September 23, 1951), was an American film actor and comedian. Ovey was born December 13, 1870, in Trenton, Missouri. He appeared in more than 200 films between 1915 and 1951, but he is best known as the character "Merry Jerry" in dozens of short films known as the "Cub Comedies" that were produced in the mid-1910s by Mutual Films and directed by Milton Fahrney. Ovey died September 23, 1951, in Hollywood, California.

== Partial filmography ==
- Jerry's Revenge
- Fatty's Reckless Fling (1915)
- Jerry in the Movies (1916)
- Jerry and the Vampire (1917)
- Oh, Mabel Behave (1922)
- Fight and Win (1924), costarring Jack Dempsey
- The Arizona Sweepstakes (1926)
- Transcontinental Limited (1926)
- The Sporting Lover (1926)
- Strings of Steel (1926)
- The Yankee Clipper (1927)
- Pals in Peril (1927)
- Desert Dust (1927)
- My Friend from India (1927)
- A Trick of Hearts (1928)
- Broadway (1929)
- The Pirate of Panama (1929)
- Night Ride (1930)
- Hit the Deck (1930)
- Gold Dust Gertie (1931)
- Hold 'Em Jail (1932)
- Alice in Wonderland (1933)
- You're Telling Me! (1934)
- 6 Day Bike Rider (1934)
- Pop Goes the Easel (Short 1935)
- Texas Terror (1935)
- The Roaring West (1935)
- Lawless Range (1935)
- King of Burlesque (1936)
- Cain and Mabel (1936)
- Rose Bowl (1936)
- Theodora Goes Wild (1936)
- Breezing Home (1936)
- Mountain Justice (1937)
- Madame X (1937)
- Trouble at Midnight (1937)
- A Girl with Ideas (1937)
- Missing Witnesses (1937)
- True Confession (1937)
- Wells Fargo (1937)
- Man-Proof (1937)
- Woman Against Woman (1938)
- Young Fugitives (1938)
- City Streets (1938)
- The Missing Guest (1938)
- Stand Up and Fight (1938)
- You Can't Cheat an Honest Man (1939)
- Calling Dr. Kildare (1939)
- The Great Victor Herbert (1939)
- Granny Get Your Gun (1940)
- Edison, the Man (1940)
- The Man Who Talked Too Much (1940)
- A Dispatch from Reuters (1940)
- A Man Betrayed (1941)
- The Wagons Roll at Night (1941)
- Life Begins for Andy Hardy (1941)
- Unholy Partners (1941)
- Woman of the Year (1942)
- Captains of the Clouds (1942)
- Fingers at the Window (1942)
- Yankee Doodle Dandy (1942)
- Tish (1942)
- Good Sam (1948)
- Act of Violence (1949)
- The Stratton Story (1949)
- Sealed Cargo (1951)
