= Selfish Yates =

1918 film

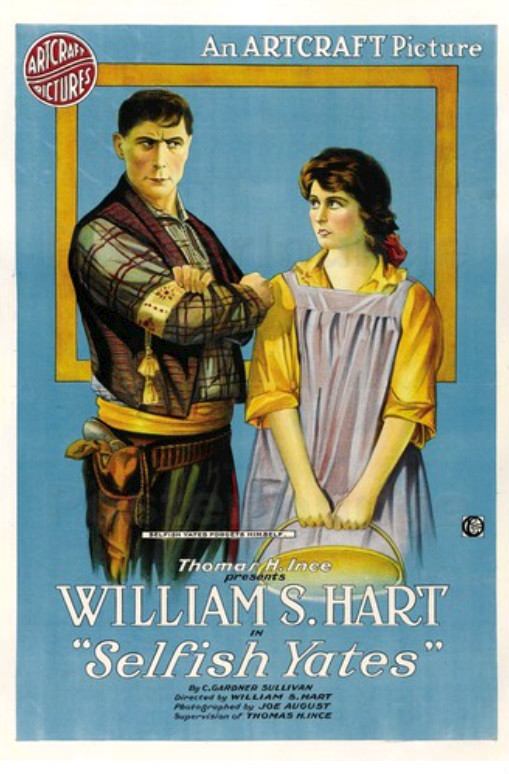
- Film poster
- Directed by: William S. Hart
- Written by: C. Gardner Sullivan (story, scenario)
- Produced by: William S. Hart; Thomas H. Ince
- Starring: William S. Hart; Jane Novak
- Cinematography: Joseph H. August
- Production company: William S. Hart Productions
- Distributed by: Paramount Pictures Artcraft
- Release dates: May 12, 1918 (New York City premiere); May 20, 1918 (general release)
- Running time: 50 minutes
- Country: United States
- Languages: Silent; English intertitles

Selfish Yates is a 1918 American silent Western film starring William S. Hart. It was directed by and co-produced by Hart along with Thomas H. Ince. Paramount Pictures handled distribution.

This is a surviving Hart western at the Museum of Modern Art.

== Plot ==
As described in a film magazine, Mary Adams, her sister Betty, and her dying father arrive at the town of Thirsty Center which is ruled by "Selfish" Yates. After the death of her father, Mary scrubs the floors of the dance hall and cooks for Yates. However, soon her finer qualities awaken a spark of manhood in Yates and he sets her to work teaching his protege Hotfoot. After rescuing Mary from his unscrupulous manager, Yates decides to dispose of his dance hall and devote the rest of his life to righteous living and making Mary happy.

== Cast ==
- William S. Hart as "Selfish" Yates
- Jane Novak as Mary Adams
- Bert Sprotte as "Rocking Chair" Riley
- Harry Dunkinson as "Oklahoma Hog"
- Ernest Butterworth as "Hotfoot"
- Thelma Salter as Betty Adams

== Reception ==
Like many American films of the time, Selfish Yates was subject to restrictions and cuts by city and state film censorship boards. For example, the Chicago Board of Censors cut, in Reel 1, young woman at bar drinking with men, the intertitle "His protege, the nameless waif of a departed dance hall girl", Reel 3, Mexican shooting man, Reel 4, closeup of Riley as he is about to spring at young woman as she lies on ground, two closeups of Yates choking man, Reel 5, three intertitles "There's a rope waiting for you, Riley", "They're going to lynch Riley", and "You've got two minutes to pray", last two scenes of mob taking man from jail, scene of cowboy with rope in hand, and all scenes of man with rope around neck up to where young woman rescues him.
