= The Lure of the Wild =

1925 film

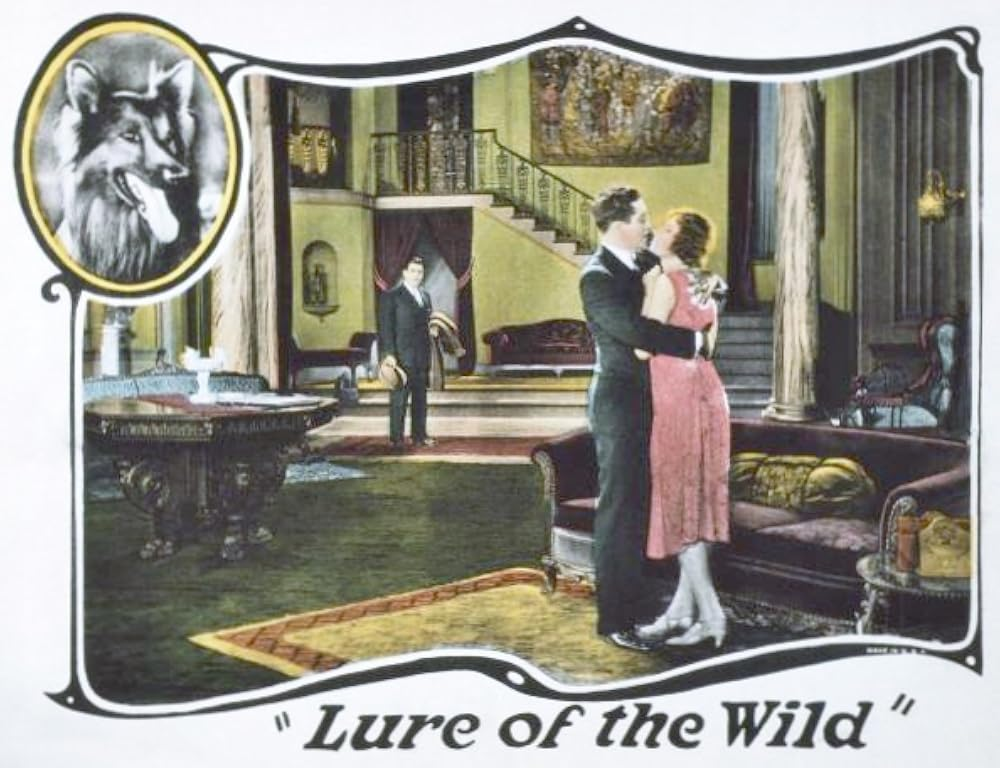
- Directed by: Frank R. Strayer
- Produced by: Harry Cohn
- Starring: Jane Novak; Alan Roscoe
- Cinematography: George Meehan
- Edited by: Charles J. Hunt
- Distributed by: Columbia Pictures
- Release date: December 12, 1925
- Running time: 6 reels
- Country: United States
- Language: Silent (English intertitles)

The Lure of the Wild is a 1925 American silent melodrama film directed by Frank R. Strayer and starring Alan Roscoe, Jane Novak, and Lightning the Dog. It was produced and released by Columbia Pictures.

== Plot ==
As described in a film magazine review, Jim Belmont, believing his wife Agnes loves Gordon Daniels, leaves for the Canadian wilderness with his daughter Cuddles and his dog Shep. He is killed by Mike Murdock at Daniels' instigation. Shep aids and protects Cuddles, who was abandoned to the mercy of the elements by her father's death. The dog fetches the trapper Poleon Dufresne, who sends for Agnes. She is followed by Daniels. Murdock confesses his crime to Dufresne. Shep saves Agnes from attack by Daniels and herds him to a cliff, where Daniels falls to his death. Agnes and Dufresne then wed.

== Cast ==
- Jane Novak as Agnes Belmont
- Alan Roscoe as Jim Belmont
- Lightning the Dog as Shep the Dog
- Billie Jean as Baby Cuddles (a.k.a. Billie Jeane Phelps)
- Richard Tucker as Gordon Daniels
- Mario Carillo as Poleon Dufresne
- Pat Harmon as Mike Murdock

== Preservation ==
A print survives in the Library of Congress collection and also in the Library and Archives Canada.
