= Sand! =

1920 film

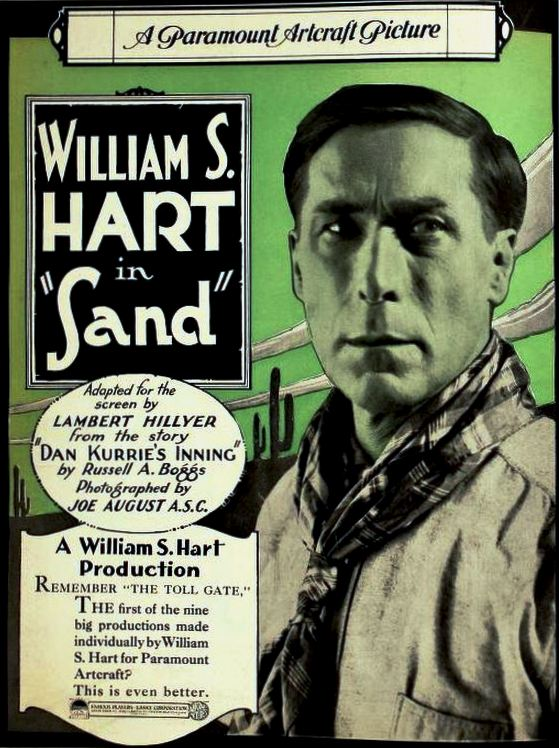
- Directed by: Lambert Hillyer
- Screenplay by: Russell A. Boggs; Lambert Hillyer
- Produced by: William S. Hart
- Starring: William S. Hart; Mary Thurman; G. Raymond Nye; Patricia Palmer; Bill Patton; S.J. Bingham
- Cinematography: Joseph H. August; Dwight Warren
- Edited by: LeRoy Stone
- Production company: William S. Hart Productions
- Distributed by: Paramount Pictures
- Release date: June 20, 1920
- Running time: 73 minutes
- Country: United States
- Languages: Silent; English intertitles

Sand! is a 1920 American silent Western film directed by Lambert Hillyer and written by Lambert Hillyer based upon the Russell A. Boggs short story "Dan Kurrie's Inning." The film stars William S. Hart, Mary Thurman, G. Raymond Nye, Patricia Palmer, Bill Patton, and S.J. Bingham. It was released on June 20, 1920, by Paramount Pictures.

Full film

== Cast ==
- William S. Hart as Dan Kurrie
- Mary Thurman as Margaret Young
- G. Raymond Nye as Joseph Garber
- Patricia Palmer as Josie Kirkwood
- Bill Patton as Pete Beckett
- S. J. Bingham as Superintendent Trap

== Survival status ==
Copies of the film are in the Library of Congress and George Eastman Museum Motion Picture Collection.

== Reception ==
The film received a positive review in The Film Daily, stating that it as a whole was a "Virile western subject that has some very pleasing bits; will sure to please Bill Hart fans".

Burns Mantle, writing for Photoplay Magazine, gave it a mixed review, stating that "A better Western than 'Human Stuff' is William S. Hart's 'Sand,' but this, too, is below the Hart standard - the standard, at least, established by 'The Toll-Gate.'"

Moving Picture World reported that president Woodrow Wilson had seen the film and had enjoyed it.
