= Three Word Brand =

1921 film

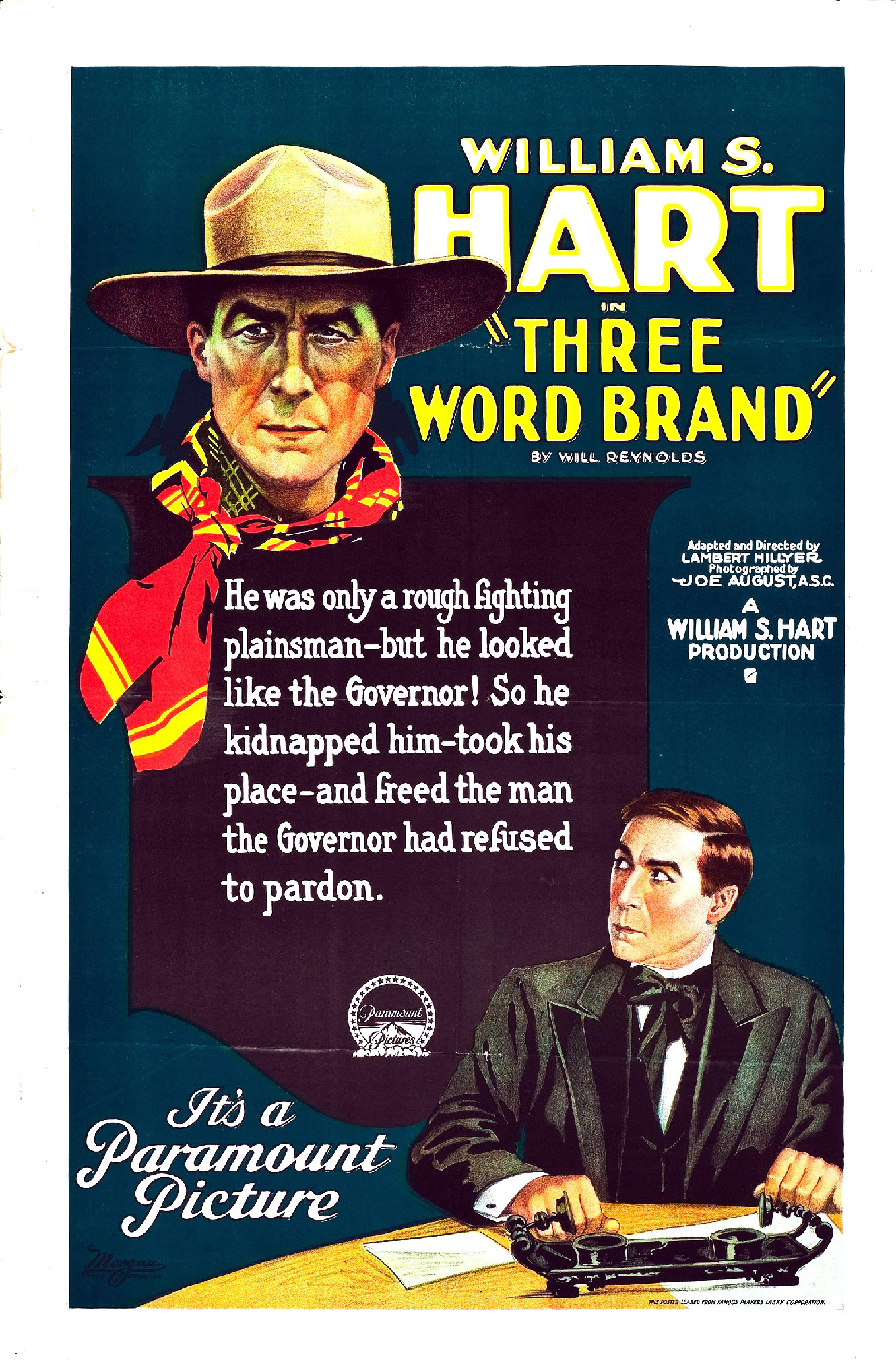
- Theatrical release poster
- Directed by: Lambert Hillyer
- Written by: Lambert Hillyer (adaptation); Will Reynolds (story)
- Produced by: William S. Hart
- Starring: William S. Hart; Jane Novak
- Cinematography: Joseph H. August
- Production company: William S. Hart Productions
- Distributed by: Paramount Pictures
- Release date: September 25, 1921
- Running time: 7 reels
- Country: United States
- Languages: Silent; English intertitles

Three Word Brand is a 1921 American silent Western film distributed by Paramount Pictures that was directed by Lambert Hillyer and starred William S. Hart and Jane Novak. Hart plays three roles in the film.

== Plot ==
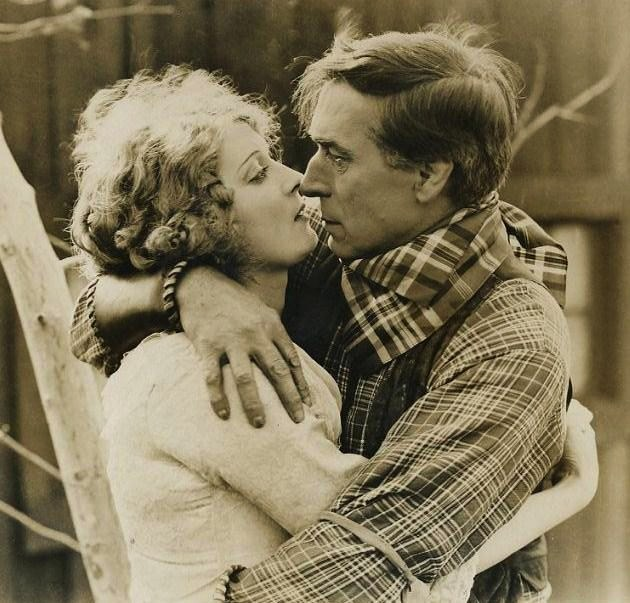
Still with Novak and Hart

As described in a film magazine, pioneer Ben Trego sends his twin baby sons on the trail while he turns to fight Indians in the wilds of Utah. When they close in on him, he commits suicide by igniting a keg of gunpowder, slaying several of the assailants in the explosion. His sons are picked up by riders who take them to the nearest settlement where they are adopted by different families. One of the boys becomes a rancher known as the Three Word Brand due to his sparsity of speech while the other becomes governor of the state. Neither knows of the other. The rancher is in partnership with George Barton who is accused of murder, but Brand believes in his innocence. At the same time Governor Marsden has been asked to sign a water bill which will deprive the ranchers in the valley of their supply of water. The governor decides to visit the valley and is seen by Brand, who notices the resemblance and hatches a plan to free his partner of the murder charge. Brand has his foreman lead the governor on false trails for several days while he goes to the capital and takes the executive's place. While masquerading as the governor Brand vetoes the water rights bill and signs a pardon for his partner Barton. Meanwhile the governor is wounded on the ranch, where he is mistaken for Brand. Brand returns and the two twins meet. The reunion gives Brand a chance to confound his enemies and also convinces his partner's sister Ethel that he is worthy of marriage.

== Cast ==
- William S. Hart as Three Word Brand / Governor Marsden / Ben Trego
- Jane Novak as Ethel Barton
- S. J. Bingham as George Barton
- J. Gordon Russell as Bull Yeates
- Ivor McFadden as Solly
- Herschel Mayall as Carroll
- Collette Forbes as Jean
- George C. Pearce as John Murray
- Leo Willis as McCabe

== Survival status ==
A copy of Three Word Brand is in the Library of Congress and Museum of Modern Art film archives.
