= In the First Degree =

1927 film directed by Phil Rosen

- Directed by: Phil Rosen
- Screenplay by: Frances Guihan
- Story by: Reginald Wright Kauffman
- Starring: Alice Calhoun; Bryant Washburn; Gayne Whitman
- Cinematography: Herbert Kirkpatrick
- Production company: Sterling Pictures
- Release date: April 15, 1927 (US)
- Running time: 6 reels
- Country: United States
- Language: English

In the First Degree is a 1927 American silent melodrama film, directed by Phil Rosen. It stars Alice Calhoun, Bryant Washburn, and Gayne Whitman, and was released on April 15, 1927.

== Cast ==
- Alice Calhoun as Barbara Hurd
- Bryant Washburn as Philip Stanwood
- Gayne Whitman as John Pendleton
- Trilby Clark as Gladys Hutton
- Gareth Hughes as Jerry Pendleton
- Joseph Girard as James Hurd
- Milton Fahrney as Warden
- William De Vaull as Butler
