= Mr. Billings Spends His Dime =

1923 film

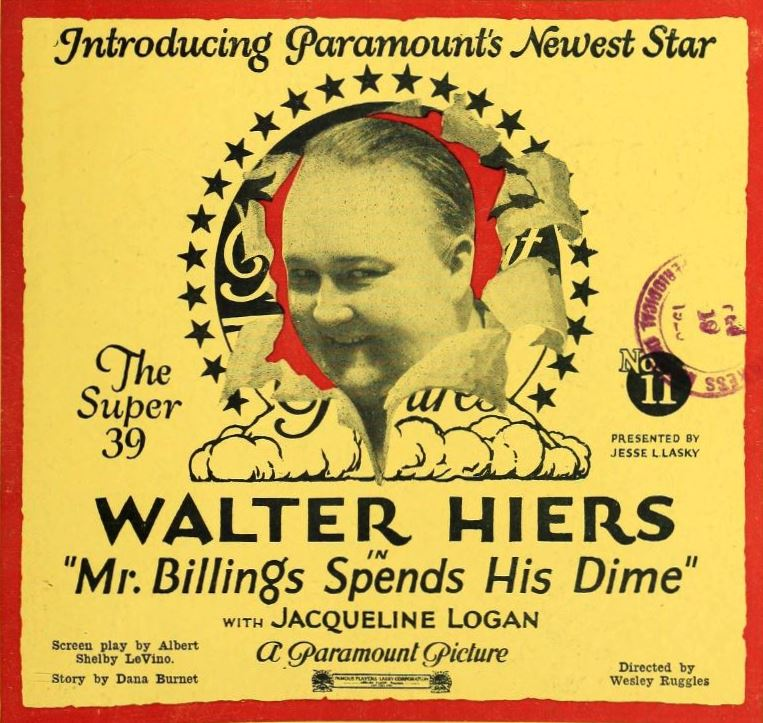
- Trade advertisement
- Directed by: Wesley Ruggles
- Screenplay by: Dana Burnet; Albert S. Le Vino
- Produced by: Jesse L. Lasky
- Starring: Walter Hiers; Jacqueline Logan; George Fawcett; Robert McKim; Patricia Palmer; Josef Swickard
- Cinematography: Charles Edgar Schoenbaum
- Production company: Famous Players–Lasky Corporation
- Distributed by: Paramount Pictures
- Release date: March 19, 1923
- Running time: 60 minutes
- Country: United States
- Language: Silent (English intertitles)

Mr. Billings Spends His Dime is a lost 1923 American silent comedy film directed by Wesley Ruggles and written by Dana Burnet and Albert S. Le Vino. The film stars Walter Hiers, Jacqueline Logan, George Fawcett, Robert McKim, Patricia Palmer, and Josef Swickard. The film was released on March 19, 1923, by Paramount Pictures.

== Cast ==
- Walter Hiers as John Percival Billings
- Jacqueline Logan as Suzanna Juárez
- George Fawcett as General Pablo Blanco
- Robert McKim as Captain Gómez
- Patricia Palmer as Priscilla Parker
- Josef Swickard as Estaban Juárez
- Guy Oliver as John D. Starbock
- Edward Patrick as White
- Clarence Burton as Diego
- George Field as Manuel
- Lucien Littlefield as Martin Green
