= Ulysses Davis =

American film director

Ulysses Davis (November 5, 1872 – October 1, 1924), was an American film director. He directed 86 films between 1911 and 1916, some at Champion Film Company. He is probably best remembered today for having directed The Kiss, a 1914 film starring Margaret Gibson and William Desmond Taylor.

He was born in South Amboy, New Jersey, United States. He died in Chicago and is buried at Waldheim Jewish Cemetery in Forest Park, Illinois.

== Selected filmography ==
- The Old Man and Jim (1911)
- Out of the Dark (1911)
- Molly Pitcher (1911)
- The Fighting Rev. Caldwell (1911)
- The Copperhead (1911)
- The Saving of Dan (1911)
- The Coward's Flute (1911)
- The Blood of the Poor (1912)
- Love That Never Fails (1912)
- The Brute (1912)
- A Divided Family (1912)
- For Her Father's Sake (1912)
- The Merchant Mayor of Indianapolis (1912)
- Wrongly Accused (1912)
- Kid Canfield (1912)
- Francine (1914)
- Anne of the Golden Heart (1914)
- The Love of Tokiwa (1914)
- Buffalo Jim (1914)
- The Way to Heaven (1914)
- Lost in Mid-Ocean (1914)
- Millions for Defence (1914)
- The Night Riders of Petersham (1914)
- The Kiss (1914)
- A Little Madonna (1914)
- Mareea the Half-Breed (1914)
- Johanna, the Barbarian (1914)
- Out in Happy Hollow (1914)
- Hunger Knows No Law (1914)
- The Mystery of the Hidden House (1914)
- The Last Will (1914)
- Only a Sister (1914)
- His Wife and His Work (1914)
- The Poor Folks' Boy (1914)
- Prosecution (1914)
- His Kid Sister (1914)
- Detective and Matchmaker (1914)
- The Horse Thief (1914)
- An Innocent Delilah (1914)
- Ward's Claim (1914)
- Brandon's Last Ride (1914)
- When the Gods Forgive (1914)
- Mareea, the Foster Mother (1914)
- Anne of the Mines (1914)
- Kidding the Boss (1914)
- The Choice (1914)
- Ann, the Blacksmith (1914)
- Sisters (1914)
- The Level (1914)
- Everything Against Him (1914)
- Pure Gold (1914)
- Love Will Out (1914)
- A Natural Man (1915)
- Marta of the Jungles (1916)
- A Cripple Creek Cinderella (1916)
- The Soul's Cycle (1916)
- The Iron Hand (1916)
