= Yankee Speed =

1924 film

- Directed by: Robert N. Bradbury
- Written by: Robert N. Bradbury
- Produced by: Anthony J. Xydias; Sunset Productions
- Starring: Kenneth MacDonald
- Cinematography: L. W. McManigal
- Distributed by: Aywon Film Corporation
- Release date: July 1, 1924
- Running time: 6 reels
- Country: United States
- Languages: Silent; English intertitles

Yankee Speed is a 1924 American silent Western film directed by Robert N. Bradbury and starring Kenneth MacDonald.

A print is preserved at the Library of Congress.

== Cast ==
- Kenneth MacDonald as Dick Vegas
- Jay Hunt as Don Verdugo
- Richard Lewis as Pedro Ramirez
- Milton J. Fahrney as Jose T. Vegas (* as Milton Fahrney)
- John Henry as Ramon Garcia
- Viola Yorga as Marquita Fernandez
- Virginia Ainsworth as Inez La Velle

== Censorship ==
Before Yankee Speed could be exhibited in Kansas, the Kansas Board of Review required the removal of a scene in reel 3, where a woman's undergarments are held up, and all Faro games in reel 5, except for the last scene.
