= The Right Man =

1925 film

- Directed by: Jack Harvey
- Written by: Harry Fraser (as Harry P. Crist)
- Starring: George Larkin; Mary Beth Milford
- Cinematography: Jack Young
- Distributed by: Rayart Pictures
- Release dates: March 27, 1925; November 15, 1926 (UK)
- Running time: 5 reels
- Country: United States
- Language: Silent (English intertitles)

The Right Man is a 1925 American silent drama film directed by Jack Harvey. It stars George Larkin and Mary Beth Milford.

== Plot ==
As described in a film magazine review, Mrs. Hoyt is infatuated with Dergan, the managing editor of her husband’s newspaper. Dergan buys a hat similar to Hoyt’s and then calls on Mrs. Hoyt. Moha, faithful to his master, shoots at Dergan but kills another maan, a crook. Mrs. Hoyt hides the hat. Tip O’Neil, a reporter, is aware of Dergan’s real villainy and the fact that Dergan is “playing” for the newspaper stock which Mrs. Hoyt owns. So when Dergan tries to win the affection of Mary Burton, who also works in the office. Tip gets busy and frustrates Dergan’s every move. Dergan finally gets shot by Moha when he attempts to take the stock certificates from Mrs. Hoyt. Mary and Tip are happy as they drive away from the Hoyt residence with Denny, Tip’s pal, as the chauffeur.

== Cast ==
- George Larkin as Tip O'Neil
- Mary Beth Milford as Mary Burton
- Jerome La Grasse as Bruce Dergan
- Ollie Kirby as Mrs. Hoyt
- Roy Laidlaw as James J. Hoyt
- Milburn Morante as Denny O’Reilly, a Houseboy
- Max Bennett as Moha, a servant
- Milton J. Fahrney as City Editor
