= June Boland =

English writer

June Boland was an English romance writer who wrote 33 novels in the interwar period, from 1920 to 1940.

== Life ==
Boland was a very popular writer in her day, with her stories serialized in newspapers including The Evening Telegraph and the Dundee Courier. She was also a keen skier who established an indoor ski school, which is reflected in several of her books such as her 1926 novel The Lure of the Snow.

== Bibliography ==
- "The Charmer." (1920)
- "The Girl in Crimson." (1920)
- "The Great Red Dawn." (1920)
- "Her Rebel Heart." (1921)
- "The Right Man." (1921)
- "The Girl from America." (1922)
- "Love Left Out." (1923)
- "The Newcomer." (1923)
- "For the Sake o' Somebody." (1924)
- "Humpy." (1924)
- "The Master Wooer." (1924)
- "The Beauty in the Background." (1925)
- "Her Second Choice." (1925)
- "His Unknown Wife." (1925)
- "Lost and Won." (1925)
- "Another Woman's Name." (1926)
- "Kirsty at the Manse." (1926)
- "The Lure of the Snow." (1926)
- "Robbed of Happiness." (1926)
- "A Bargain for Love." (1927)
- "Her Splendid Bondage." (1927)
- "Her Stolen Name." (1928)
- "Hôtel Splendide." (1928)
- "Anne Bannister." (1928)
- "A Tyrant in Love." (1929)
- "The Fortunate Lady." (1930)
- "A One-Man Girl." (1931)
- "The Alabaster Nymph." (1932)
- "Ishmael's Daughter." (1932)
- "A Desperate Cure." (1935)
- "The Black Forest Inn." (1936)
- "The Secret of Westmayne. By June Boland. (His Dancing Daughter. By Mrs. Frances Brown.)." (1937)
- "The Courtly Beggar." (1940)
