= Jane Novak =

American actress (1896–1990)

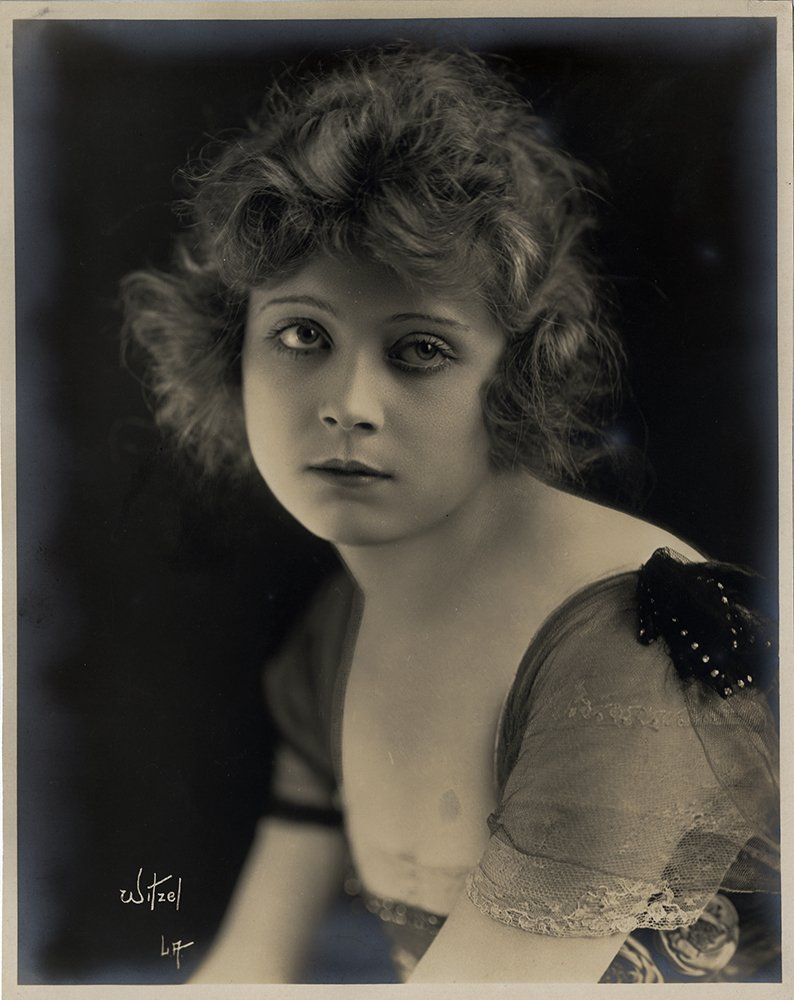
- Novak, c. 1922
- Born: Johana Barbara Novak; January 12, 1896; St. Louis, Missouri, U.S.
- Died: February 1, 1990 (aged 94); Woodland Hills, California, U.S.
- Occupations: Actress, author
- Years active: 1913–1954
- Spouse: Frank Newburg (m. 1915; div. 1918)
- Children: 1
- Relatives: Eva Novak (sister); Anne Schaefer (aunt)

Jane Novak (born Johana Barbara Novak; January 12, 1896 – February 1, 1990) was an American actress of the silent film era.

== Background ==
Jane Novak was born Johana Barbara Novak on 12 January 1896 in St. Louis, Missouri to Bohemian immigrant Joseph Jerome Novak from Lišov and Barbara Medek, whose father was born in Kbel. She was baptized Catholic on the 14th at St. Wenceslaus. Joseph J Novak, an editor for the Hlas newspaper, froze on his way to Baden Station on 14 December 1901, after local weather reached -2 °F, a standing record for that day of the month. "Jane" was 5-years-old, and Barbara was left to raise 5 children. Her younger sister Eva also became an actress. Their older brother, Joseph, worked as head cameraman for Desilu.

Novak attended School Sisters of Notre Dame convent school in St. Louis, but ran away with a friend with whom she created a vaudeville act. Although she returned home, her aunt (by marriage), actress Anne Schaefer, invited her to California where she began acting in motion pictures in 1913 at the age of 17. The actress began in a stage stock company with her uncle in St. Louis. Novak, whose career extended into the sound era, appeared in a total of 115 films.

== Career ==
She appeared in a movie on her first day in Southern California, before there was a film studio in Hollywood. There she met Frank Newburg, who was, at the time, leading man to Ruth Roland at the Kalem and American Mutoscope and Biograph companies. Newburg took her to a studio in Santa Monica, California, where her aunt Anne Schafer was a popular star. Newburg and Novak later married in 1915 and had one daughter. However, the marriage was short lived, and the couple divorced in 1918.

Novak endured as a performer, in part, by sacrificing sensational roles for roles as leading women in more wholesome films. Some actresses who were Novak's contemporaries quickly found stardom, yet were forgotten soon afterward, while she was considered an "old-fashioned girl." As a result, Novak, refused to work in films with other leading ladies. She played opposite Wallace Beery, Tom Mix, Hobart Bosworth, Alan Hale, Thomas Moore, and Lewis Stone. At one time, she was engaged to marry Western star William S. Hart, but their marriage never took place. She made five films with Hart.

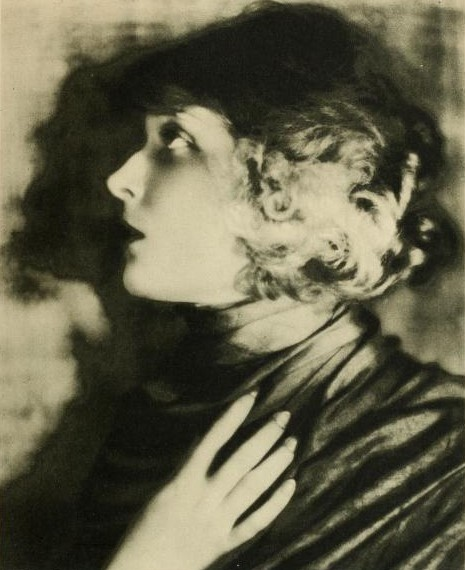
Publicity photo of Jane Novak from Stars of the Photoplay (1924)

Novak's movies often were based on outdoor stories. Some of these include Treat 'Em Rough (1919), Kazan (1921), Isobel (1920), The River's End (1920), and The Rosary (1922). By March 1922, she had her own company and was under contract for five outdoor movies, with a salary at $1,500 per week. Aside from Mary Pickford and Douglas Fairbanks, Sr., Novak was the first film star to paid in four figures for a single movie. At this time, performers were only paid while a movie was shooting. An entire film was completed in three or four weeks.

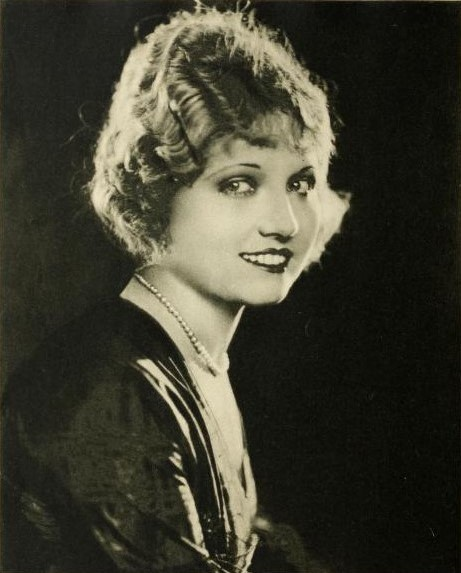
Novak's sister Eva Novak

Novak's last starring role was opposite Richard Dix in the Technicolor production Redskin (1929). The movie was supposed to be with sound, but there was a contract dispute involving this being Dix's final film with Paramount Pictures, so it was shot as a silent film. Novak's voice was good, but she made only a handful of pictures following the advent of sound. One was a World War II epic titled The Yanks Are Coming featuring Slapsie Maxie Rosenbloom. She also appeared in Alfred Hitchcock's Foreign Correspondent in 1940, having met him previously in the 1920s when making The Prude's Fall (1925).

In 1974, the former silent screen star published a cookbook titled Treasury of Chicken Cooking. The volume is a collection of 300 recipes compiled by Novak over the years, all of them her own.

Novak's last appearance on camera was in 1988 for the documentary Harold Lloyd: The Third Genius (1989) by David Gill and Kevin Brownlow, and first screened on ITV.

Jane Novak died in Woodland Hills, California of a stroke in 1990 at the age of 94.

== Partial filmography ==
- The Kiss (1914)
- A Little Madonna (1914)
- Willie Runs the Park (1915)
- Graft (1915)
- Just Nuts (1915)
- From Italy's Shores (1915)
- The Hungry Actors (1915)
- The Iron Hand (1916)
- The Innocent Sinner (1917)
- Selfish Yates (1918)
- The Temple of Dusk (1918)
- Treat 'Em Rough (1919)
- Wagon Tracks (1919)
- Behind the Door (1919)
- The Golden Trail (1920)
- The River's End (1920)
- The Great Accident (1920)
- The Barbarian (1920)
- Roads of Destiny (1921)
- Three Word Brand (1921)
- Kazan (1921)
- The Other Woman (1921)
- The Snowshoe Trail (1922)
- The Rosary (1922)
- Thelma (1922)
- Belle of Alaska (1922)
- Colleen of the Pines (1922)
- Divorce (1923)
- Jealous Husbands (1923)
- The Man Life Passed By (1923)
- The Lullaby (1924)
- Two Shall Be Born (1924)
- The Man Without a Heart (1924)
- The Prude's Fall (1924)
- The Blackguard (1925)
- The Danger Signal (1925)
- The Substitute Wife (1925)
- Lazybones (1925)
- Share and Share Alike (1925)
- The Lure of the Wild (1925)
- Whispering Canyon (1926)
- Lost at Sea (1926)
- Closed Gates (1927)
- One Increasing Purpose (1927)
- Free Lips (1928)
- Redskin (1929)
- Ghost Town (1936)
- Hollywood Boulevard (1936)
- Gallant Lady (1942)
- The Yanks Are Coming (1942)
- Here Comes Kelly (1943)
- Man of Courage (1943)
- Desert Fury (1947)
- Scared Stiff (1953) as Nightclub Patron

== Sources ==
- Modesto, California News, "Jane Novak-She's Filmland's Old-Fashioned Girl", March 8, 1922, page 5
- Nevada State Journal, "Silent Films Star Jane Novak Talks at Length About Her Past", Friday, November 22, 1974, page 37
