= Margaret Gibson (actress) =

American actress (1894–1964)

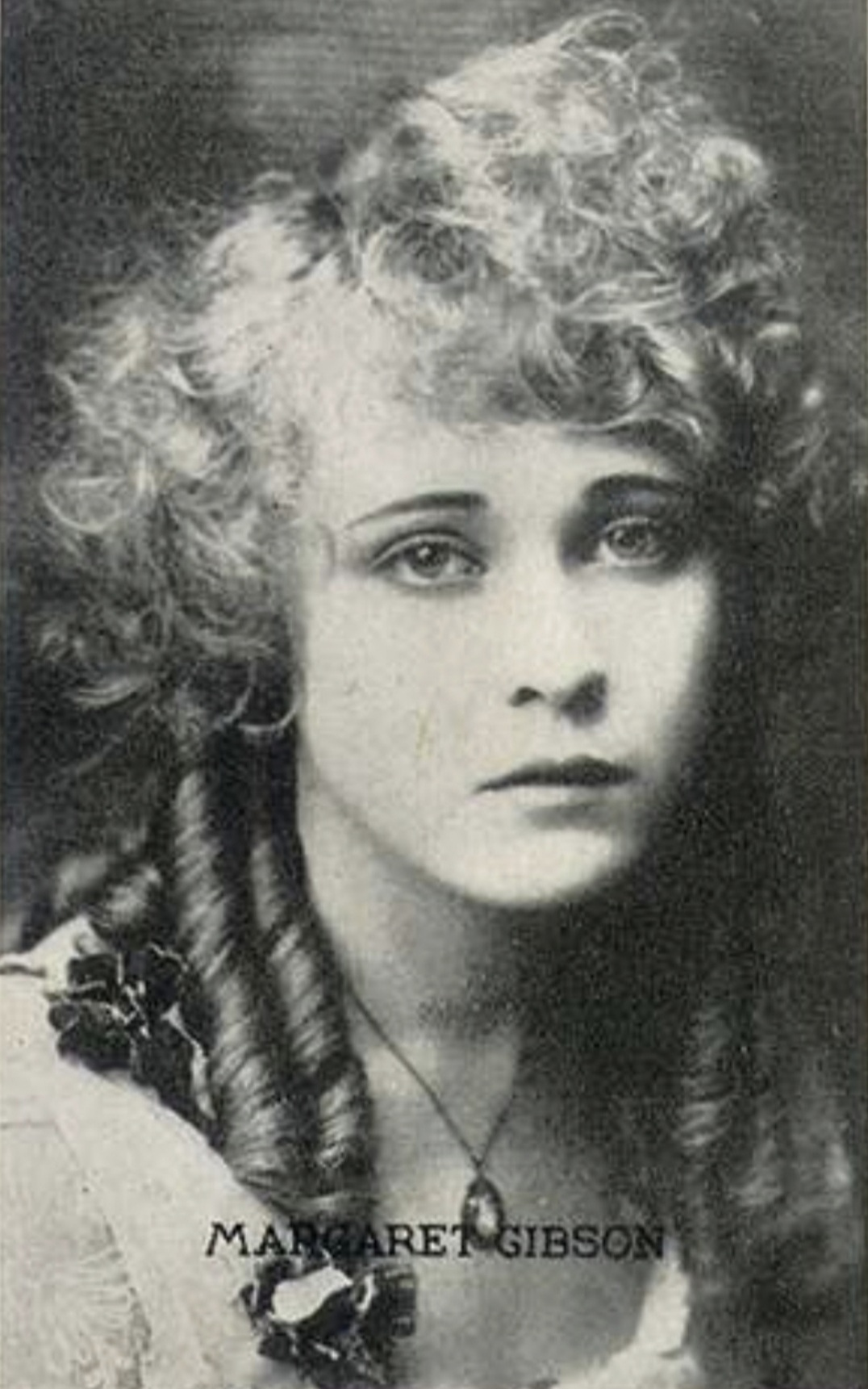
- Gibson, 1917
- Born: Ella Margaret Gibson; September 14, 1894; Colorado Springs, Colorado, U.S.
- Died: October 21, 1964 (aged 70); Hollywood, California, U.S.
- Other names: Margie Gibson; Marguerite Gibson; Helen Gibson; Patricia Palmer; Patsy Palmer; Ella Margaret Arce; Pat Lewis
- Years active: 1913–1929
- Spouse: Elbert Lewis (m. 1935; died 1942)

Ella Margaret Gibson (September 14, 1894 – October 21, 1964) was an American stage and silent-film actress who had leading roles in Vitagraph Westerns, often opposite William Clifford. She also appeared with Charles Ray in The Coward (1915) and later worked in two Westerns with William S. Hart: The Money Corral and Sand! On her deathbed in 1964, she reportedly made a dying confession to the 1922 murder of director William Desmond Taylor.

Gibson was sometimes credited or otherwise identified under at least seven other names, such as Patricia Palmer, Patsy Palmer, Margie Gibson, Marguerite Gibson, Ella Margaret Lewis, Ella Margaret Arce, or Pat Lewis. She appeared in 147 films between 1913 and 1929.

== Family ==
Gibson was the daughter of Ellsbarry James Gibson, a musician of Scotch-Irish descent, and Celia Ella Fisher, a vocalist of English descent. She had two older siblings, Forest and Edna. By her own account, Gibson's parents had worked in show business.

== Career ==
She began her stage career at the age of 12, when her father allegedly left and she remained as the sole means of support for her mother. Gibson appeared on the Pantages Vaudeville Circuit for over two years. In 1909, she became a member of the Theodore Lorch Stock Company in Denver, where she was cast in a wide variety of roles. She entered the film industry in 1912, getting a job with Vitagraph in Santa Monica, where she stayed for three years. For six months during this period, Taylor was acting in the same studio and they made four films together: The Love of Tokiwa, The Riders of Petersham, The Kiss, and A Little Madonna.

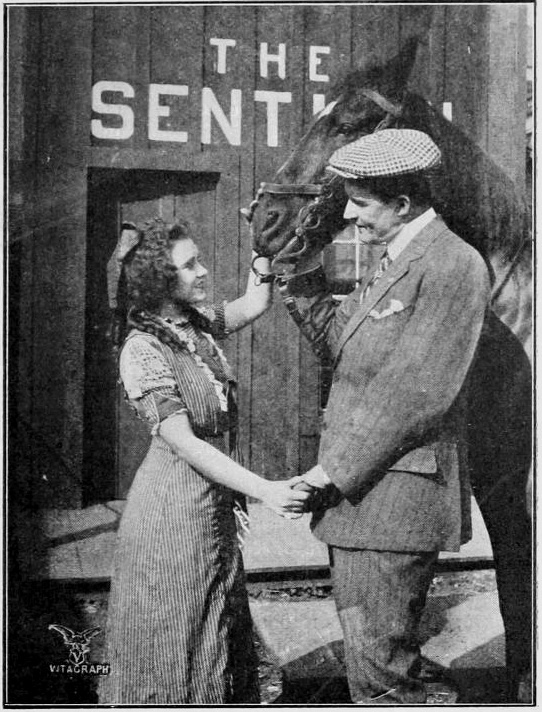
Still from the 1914 Vitagraph film "The Riders of Petersham", with Margaret Gibson and William Desmond Taylor

An article in Variety the following year noted that the 19-year-old budding film star had purchased a cliffside bungalow overlooking the Pacific Ocean in Santa Monica. In 1915, she left Vitagraph and went to the Thomas Ince Film Company, where she played a small supporting role in The Coward, the film which made Charles Ray a star. She subsequently had supporting roles in many comedy shorts and was the subject of several promotional articles in fan magazines.

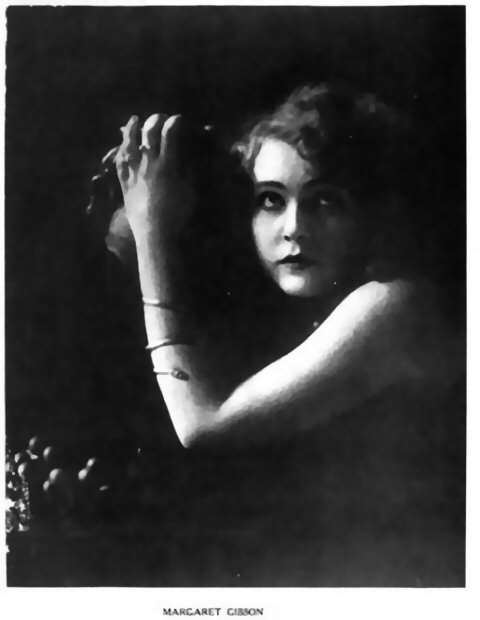
Gibson featured in Motion Picture Magazine, 1915

Her first starring role after Vitagraph was in Mutual Masterpicture's The Soul's Cycle (1916), in which she played both an attractive Roman maiden and a modern New York heiress. Other noted roles included leads in The Riders of Petersham, Back to Eden, and The Outlaw.

In 1917, Gibson was arrested for vagrancy under circumstances which included allegations of drug (opium) dealing. After a "largely attended" public trial, the popular actress, who "during intermissions... was the center of a bevy of young women," was acquitted, but the publicity forced her to quietly change her screen name to Patricia Palmer (among other names). She continued to work in films, but had few leading roles. Gibson obtained many bit parts, including a brief appearance in The King of Kings.

=== 1923 arrest ===
On November 2, 1923 (21 months after Taylor's murder), Gibson was arrested at her home at 2324 North Beachwood Drive, Los Angeles, California on federal felony charges involving an alleged nationwide blackmail and extortion ring. She was subsequently charged with extortion and violation of Section 145 of the Federal Criminal Code. George W. Lasher told authorities he had paid Gibson $1155 to avoid prosecution for a reputed violation of the Mann Act. Gibson was also said to be connected to two convicted blackmailers who had pleaded guilty the preceding week to extorting $10,000 from Ohio banker John L. Bushnell. Amid all the publicity following her arrest, she was mentioned as both Margaret Gibson and Patricia Palmer. The charges were later dropped by the district attorney's office. Over the next six years, she worked sporadically in bit parts and minor supporting roles, but the industry's transition to sound film resulted in the end of Gibson's already thwarted career.

== Marriage and later life ==
In 1935, for unknown reasons, she "fled" to Singapore, where she married Elbert Lewis, an auditor for Socony-Vacuum Oil Company (later merged with Mobil Oil). How they met is unknown. From the available documentation, the assumption is they met on the dock when she arrived in Singapore. However, in a letter to her dated February 8, 1942, Elbert wrote "Do you remember, dearest, the morning of your first arrival in Singapore, seven sweet years ago, when I pushed all the boats out of the harbor so your ship could come in?" which could be either romantic metaphor, or a hint he was waiting for her there (the same letter mentions a clearly metaphorical female character he calls "Elfin", to which Elbert attributes much "good luck" he apparently thinks they had in the past).

Surviving letters indicate the marriage was stable, and she had no intention of returning to the United States. The middle-aged couple discussed retiring in either South Africa or Australia. Meanwhile, they moved about constantly in the Bay of Bengal area in the Indian Ocean, staying in Ceylon, India, Burma, Straits Settlements, and Java. In 1940, at the age of 45, Gibson was stricken by a bladder infection for which medical treatment was not available in the region. With Europe overwhelmed by war and passage to South Africa and Australia threatened by German naval operations, she reluctantly returned without her spouse to Los Angeles and underwent surgery twice at Hollywood Hospital. Her husband Elbert Lewis died when the Japanese bombed Socony-Vacuum's oil facility at Penang, Straits Settlements (now Malaysia) on March 15, 1942.

In 1949, Gibson moved to a small, sparsely furnished house at 6135 Glen Oak St. in the Hollywood Hills near Beachwood Village, close to where she had owned residential property during the 1920s. Living very modestly on a widow's pension under the name Pat Lewis, she reportedly almost never left the house (which was behind thick vegetation), limited her activities mostly to gardening, had a dark grey cat named Rajah, and had her groceries delivered.

== Confession and death ==
On October 21, 1964, while still living in Hollywood, Gibson suffered a heart attack at her home. Sensing that she was dying, a highly distraught Gibson—a recently converted Roman Catholic—asked for a priest and then confessed to neighbors the February 1, 1922, murder of Hollywood film director William Desmond Taylor.

Gibson had apparently made similar remarks the previous evening while watching a local television program, Ralph Story's Los Angeles. The program featured a short segment about the unsolved murder of Taylor 40 years earlier in which Ralph Story said the Taylor murder is something the police "had better solve in the next 90 days". Gibson "became hysterical and blurted out that she'd killed him and thought it was long forgotten".

In the aftermath of Taylor's murder, newspapers had speculated wildly about possible suspects, and rumors circulated that his death was related to a blackmail attempt. Taylor's neighbor Faith MacLean likely saw the murderer leaving Taylor's bungalow, and said the person with whom she made eye contact (and who smiled at her) may have been a woman dressed as a man, in clothes which were "like my idea of a motion picture burglar".

Gibson was in Los Angeles at the time of the murder, but her name was never mentioned during the investigation and no surviving documentation refers to any association between Taylor and her after 1914. Gibson's reported confession does not conflict with the known historical record. Given her documented arrest record, Taylor's reportedly odd remarks in the weeks leading to his murder, and other circumstantial evidence, the inferred motive would have been related to blackmail in the wake of the Roscoe Arbuckle scandal, during which the private lives of most Hollywood celebrities easily could fall under highly sensationalized public scrutiny.

All of the police files and physical evidence relating to Taylor's murder had disappeared by 1940, and aside from circumstantial evidence, no independent confirmation of Gibson's involvement in it has emerged. Margaret Gibson is buried at Holy Cross Cemetery in Culver City, California.

== Filmography ==
Throughout her career, Gibson's many movie appearances were credited under at least six different names. However, overwhelmingly, she was credited under only two, first as Margaret Gibson and later as Patricia Palmer.

=== As Margaret Gibson ===
- The Sea Maiden (1913)
- The Wrong Pair (1913)
- The Yellow Streak (1913)
- The Spell (1913)
- Old Moddington's Daughters (1913)
- Sunny; or, The Cattle Thief (1913)
- The Race (1913)
- The Outlaw (1913)
- Bianca (1913)
- Any Port in a Storm (1913)
- Francine (1914)
- The Love of Tokiwa (1914)
- The Old Oak's Secret (1914)
- Ginger's Reign (1914)
- Auntie (1914)
- The Ghosts (1914)
- The Night Riders of Petersham (1914)
- The Kiss (1914)
- A Little Madonna (1914)
- Tony, the Greaser (1914)
- Mareea the Half-Breed (1914)
- Out in Happy Hollow (1914)
- The Mystery of the Hidden House (1914)
- The Last Will (1914)
- Only a Sister (1914)
- Prosecution (1914)
- His Kid Sister (1914)
- Detective and Matchmaker (1914)
- The Horse Thief (1914)
- Brandon's Last Ride (1914)
- When the Gods Forgive (1914)
- Mareea, the Foster Mother (1914)
- Anne of the Mines (1914)
- Kidding the Boss (1914)
- Sisters (1914)
- Love Will Out (1914)
- The Navajo Ring (1915)
- The Girl at Nolan's (1915)
- The Taming of Rita (1915)
- A Child of the North (1915)
- Almost a Hero (1915)
- An Intercepted Vengeance (1915)
- The Sea Ghost (1915)
- His Mother's Portrait (1915)
- The Hammer (1915)
- All on Account of Towser (1915)
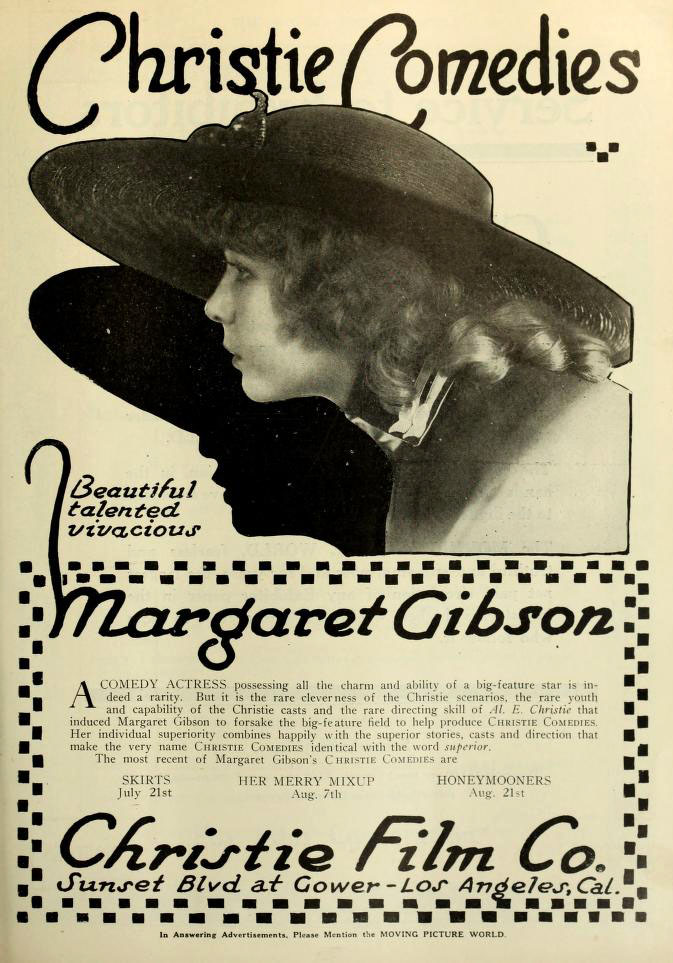
  Advertisement (1917)
- The Golden Trail (1915)
- A City Rube (1915)
- The Siren (1915)
- The Protest (1915)
- The Coward (1915)
- Could a Man Do More? (1915)
- The Arab's Vengeance (1915)
- The Winning of Jess (1915)
- The Homesteaders (1916)
- Marta of the Jungles (1916)
- The Bait (1916)
- A Soul Enslaved (1916)
- The Soul's Cycle (1916)
- The Heart of Tara (1916)
- The Hidden Law (1916)
- Public Approval (1916)
- The Leopard's Bride aka Nadje's Sacrifice (1916)
- Avenged by Lions (1916)
- Highlights and Shadows (1916)
- A Kaffir's Gratitude (1916)
- Clouds in Sunshine Valley (1916)
- The Lion's Nemesis (1916)
- The Star of India (1916)
- A Siren of the Jungle (1916)
- The Good-for-Nothing Brat (1916)
- The Ostrich Tip (1916)
- Fate's Decision (1916)
- Destiny's Boomerang (1916)
- The Island of Desire (1917)
- With the Mummies' Help (1917)
- The Milky Way (1917)
- A Lucky Slip (1917)
- The Fourteenth Man (1917)
- He Fell on the Beach (1917)
- Skirts (1917)
- The Honeymooners (1917)
- Her Merry Mix-Up (1917)
- Green Eyes and Bullets (1917)
- Hearts and Clubs (1917)
- Local Color (1917)
- Almost Divorced (1917)
- Betty Wakes Up (1917)
- Their Seaside Tangle (1917)
- Rowdy Ann (1919)

=== As Patricia Palmer ===
- The Fifth Wheel (1918)
- The Moment of Victory (1918)
- Dismissal of Silver Phil (1918)
- The Home Trail (1918)
- By Injunction (1918)
- The Woman in the Web (1918)
- The Girl from Beyond (1918)
- The Coming of Faro Nell (1918)
- A Gentleman's Agreement (1918)
- The Marquis and Miss Sally (1918)
- The Wooing of Riley (1918)
- By the World Forgot (1918)
- You Couldn't Blame Her (1919)
- Sea Sirens (1919)
- The Money Corral (1919)
- Sally's Blighted Career (1919)
- Tell Your Wife Everything (1919)
- Oh, My Dear! (1919)
- Mary Moves In (1919)
- The Faith of the Strong (1919)
- Into the Light (1920)
- Sand! (1920)
- Blondes (1921)
- His Bitter Half (1921)
- Mixed Bedrooms (1921)
- The Desert Wolf (1921)
- Turkey Dressing (1921)
- Greater Than Love (1921)
- Across the Border (1922)
- Rounding Up the Law (1922)
- Cold Feet (1922)
- The Cowboy King (1922)
- The Cowboy and the Lady (1922)
- The Web of the Law (1923)
- Mr. Billings Spends His Dime (1923)
- A Perfect 36 (1923)
- To the Ladies (1923)
- A Pair of Hellions (1924)
- Hold Your Breath (1924)
- The Part Time Wife (1925)
- Without Mercy (1925)
- Who's Your Friend (1925)
- The Waster (1926)
- Naughty Nanette (1927)
- The Little Savage (1929)

=== As Marguerite Gibson ===
- Polly at the Ranch (1913)

=== As Margie Gibson ===
- The Hammer (1915)

=== As Helen Gibson ===
- Hearts and Clubs (1917)

=== As Patsy Palmer ===
- Dummy Love (1921)

=== Uncredited ===
- The King of Kings (1927)
- The Godless Girl (1929)
