= David Horsley =

English-American film director (1873–1933)

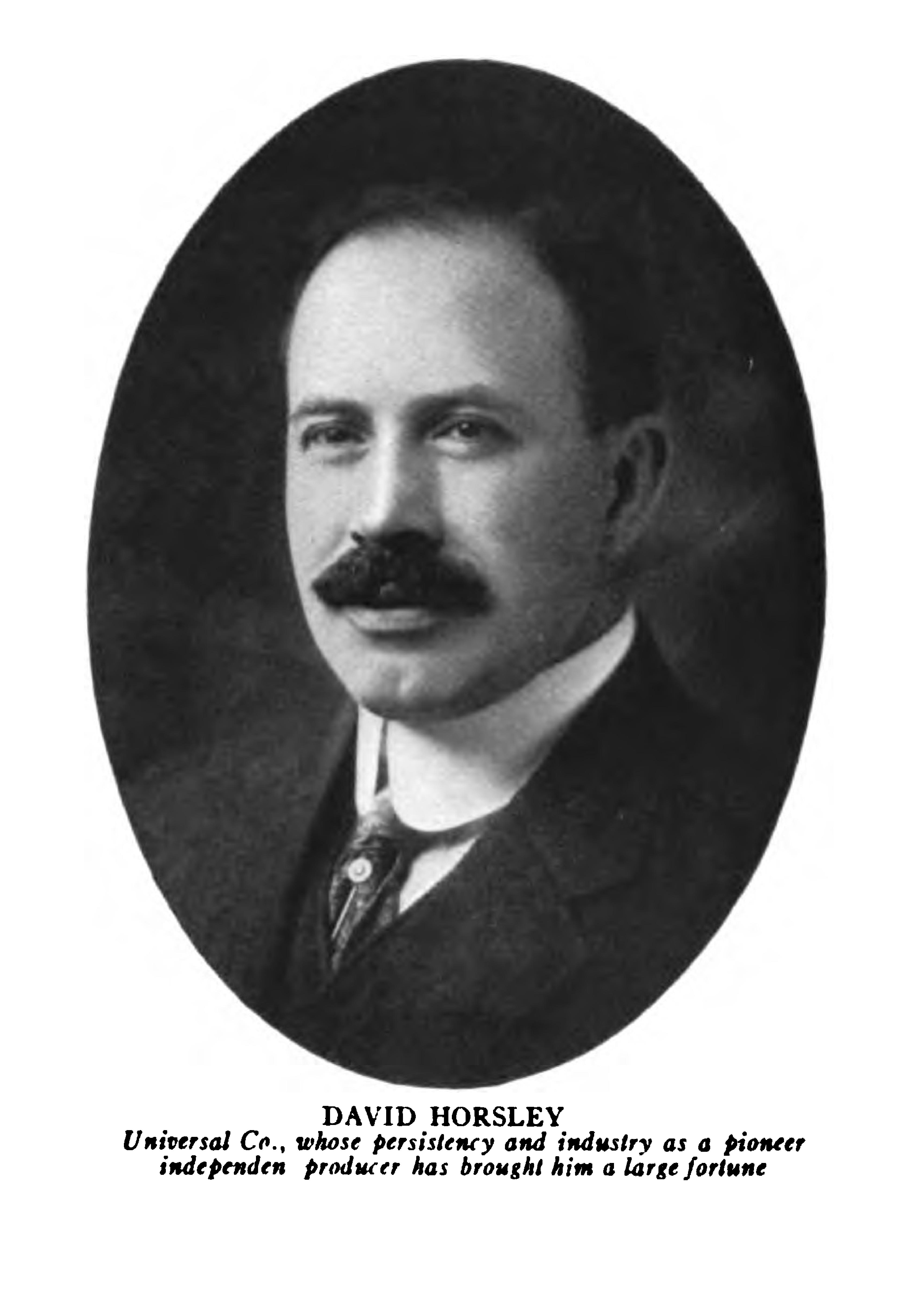
- Born: 11 March 1873; Stanley, County Durham
- Died: 23 February 1933; Los Angeles
- Notable work: Founder, Centaur Film Company and Nestor Film Company
- Children: David Stanley Horsley

David Horsley (March 11, 1873 – February 23, 1933) was an English-American pioneer of the film industry. He founded the Centaur Film Company and its West Coast branch, the Nestor Film Company, which established the first film studio in Hollywood in 1911.

== Biography ==
Horsley was born in Stanley, County Durham in northern England.

In 1884, the family moved to Bayonne, New Jersey where as a young man he built a bicycle business and ran a pool hall. It was then that he met a former employee of Biograph Studios, Charles Gorman, and along with his brother William Horsley (1870–1956), they formed the Centaur Film Company. By 1910 their operation was producing three films a week, including the Mutt and Jeff comedies.

David and William Horsley, along with other film independents, succeeded in defeating the monopolistic hold on the industry of Thomas Edison's Motion Picture Patents Company. However, weather conditions on the East Coast made filming an uncertain proposition because camera technology at the time relied on sunshine. Frustrated, and realizing that California afforded the opportunity to make films year round, David Horsley moved his operations to the West Coast.

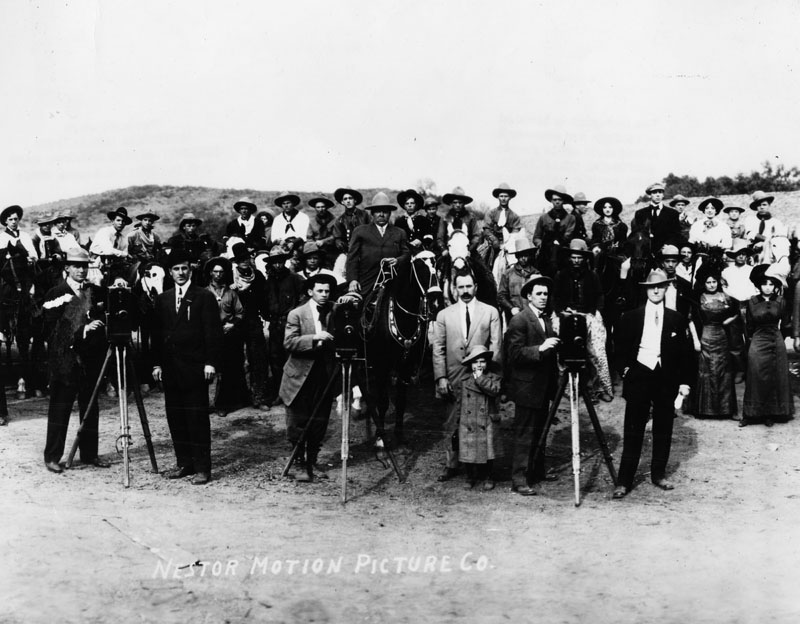
Nestor group photo including Horsley and son during a western shoot

Among the first motion pictures ever filmed in Hollywood was taken on October 26, 1911 in the orchards of H J Whitley's estate (D.W. Griffith filmed Love Among the Roses at the studio of famed French floral painter, Paul de Longpre at his home and studio in Hollywood in 1909). Although the movie never really had a name it is a true piece of Hollywood history. In the fall of 1911, the Nestor Motion Picture Company opened the first motion picture studio in Hollywood in the Blondeau Tavern building at the corner of Sunset Boulevard and Gower Street. With Horsley was Al Christie who served as general manager in charge of Christie Comedies plus Charles Rosher who lent his expertise as the studio's full-time cameraman. Other East Coast film companies recognized Horsley's advantage and quickly followed his lead.

In April 1912, the Universal Film Manufacturing Company was formed and David Horsley and other small studios merged, each accepting shares in Universal as payment for their business. Horsley received $175,000 in preferred stock and $204,000 in common stock in the new Universal Film Company and was also appointed the company's treasurer. However, the peaceful merger soon turned sour and in 1913 Horsley sold his interest to Carl Laemmle. A wealthy man, David Horsley travelled to his birthplace and around Europe.

After returning to California, and investing in a failed exotic animal show, David Horsley went back into the motion picture business with David Horsley Studios and using the animals from the failed show, established the Bostock Jungle Films Company. By the spring of 1917, he had outfitted his new operations in Los Angeles at Main and Washington streets however a series of setbacks cost Horsley his entire fortune and left him in debt.

David Horsley died in Los Angeles. He is interred in the Hollywood Forever Cemetery, Hollywood.

His son David Stanley Horsley (1906–1976) trained as a cinematographer and became an expert in special effects photography, working in the film industry for nearly thirty years.
