= Betty Compson filmography =

List of films featuring American actress Betty Compson

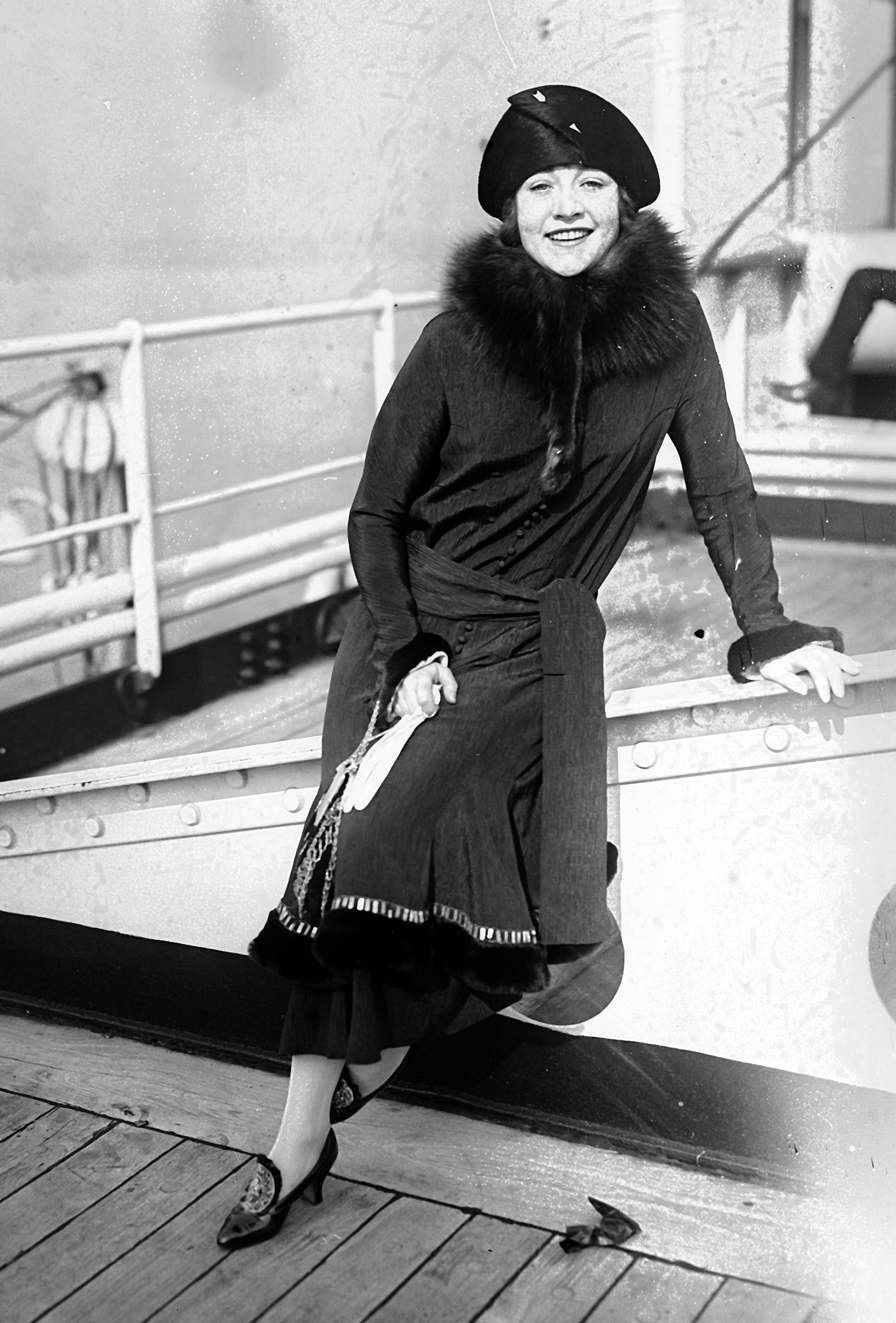
Betty Compson, aboard a ship, 1920s.

This page includes Betty Compson's (March 19, 1897 – April 18, 1974) known film appearances from 1915 to 1948.

Films from 1915 to 1919 are shorts, mostly for Al Christie, unless otherwise stated. A big breakout came in 1919, with The Miracle Man, which is now lost. In the early-to-mid 1920s, Compson was a major player at Paramount. By the end of the decade, her work became free-lance. Her fame began to decline after marrying director James Cruze, and she would remain a feature support for the rest of her film career.

== Shorts ==
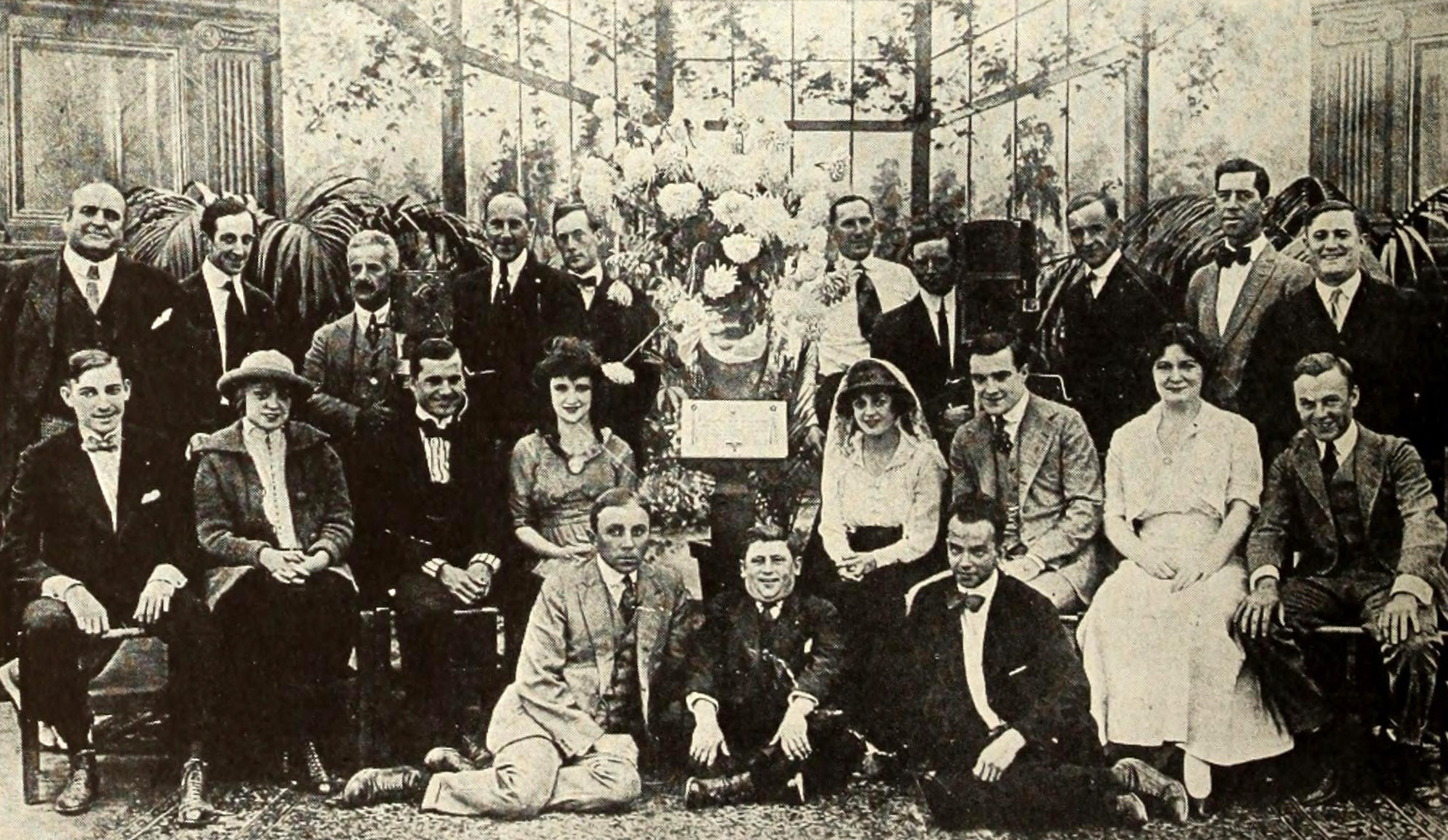
Compson with the Al Christie company center, left, c. 1916.

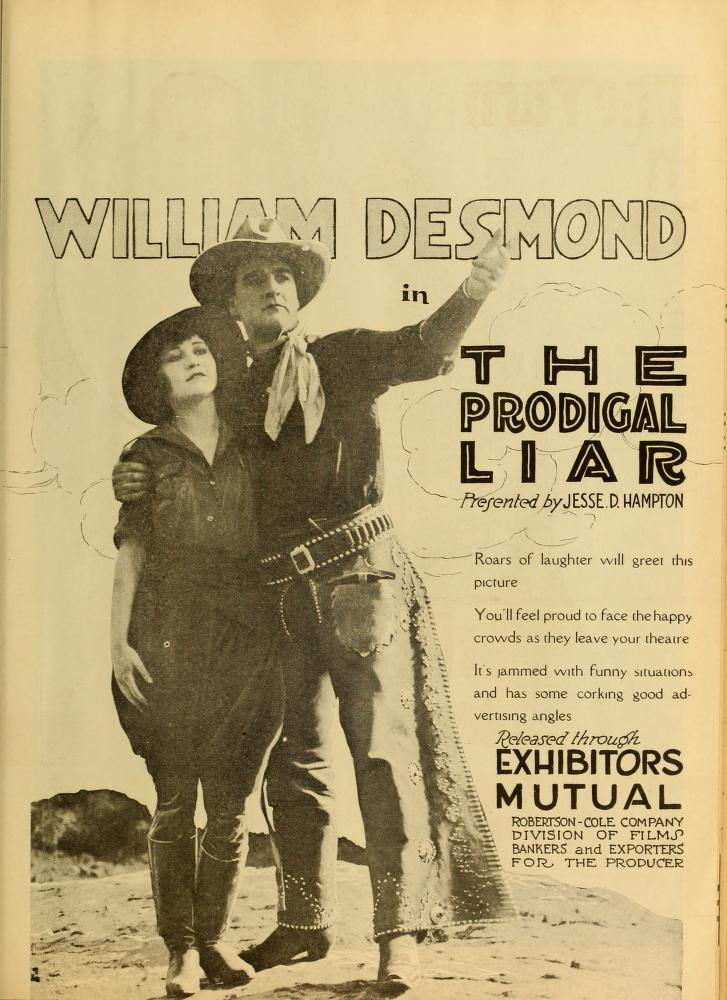
With William Desmond in The Prodigal Liar 1919.

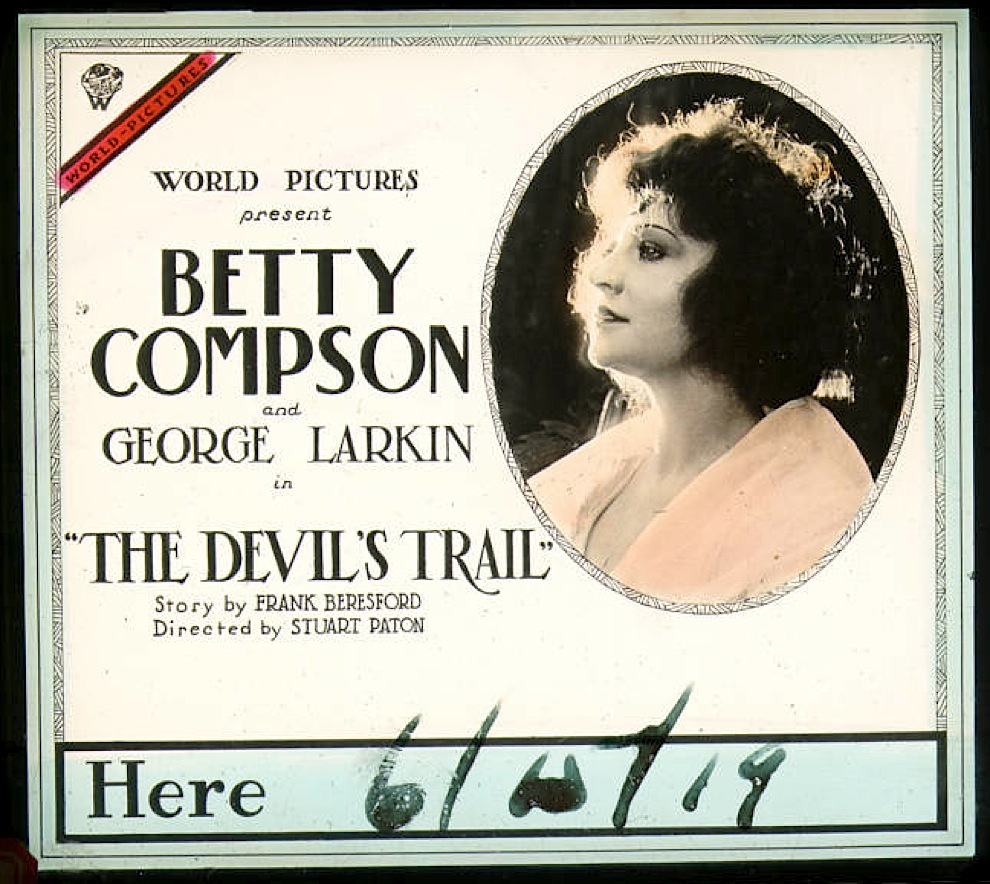
The Devil's Trail lantern slide, 1919

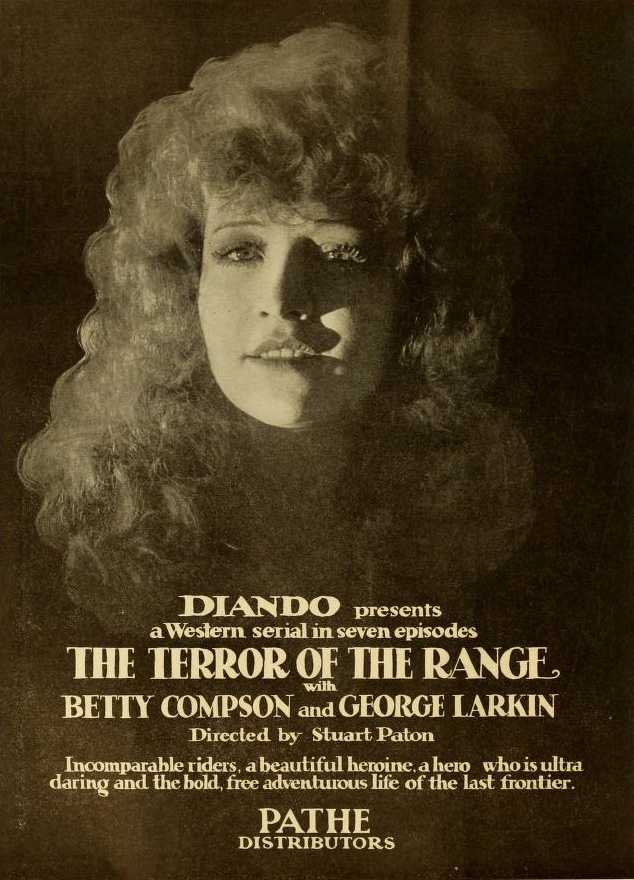
The Terror of the Range, 1919, lobby poster

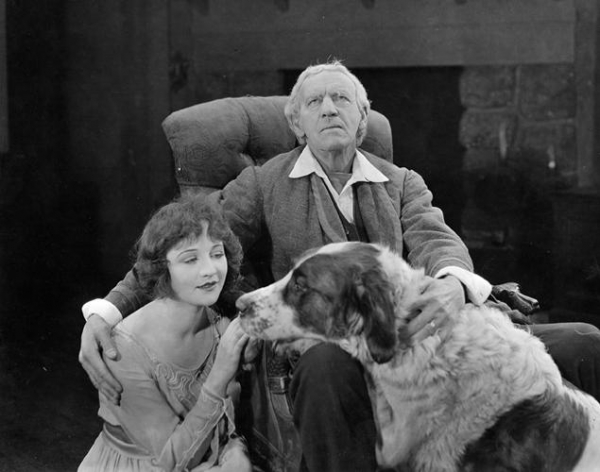
With Joseph J. Dowling in The Miracle Man, 1919

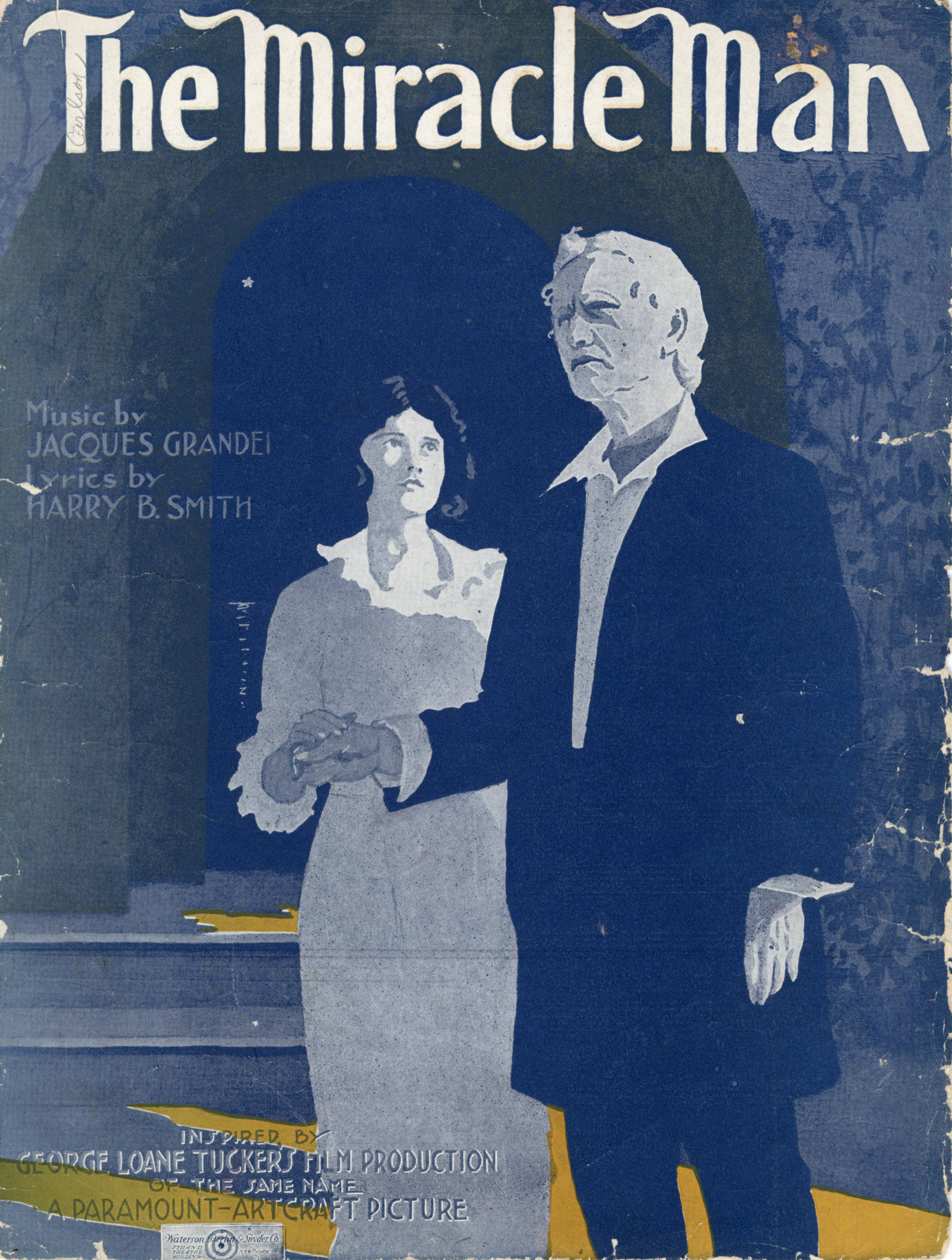
Sheet music cover to The Miracle Man, 1919

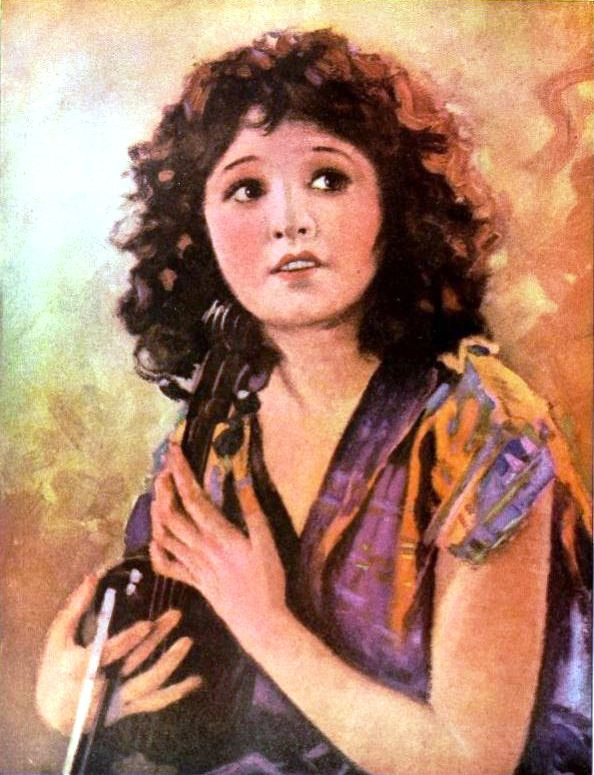
On the cover of Shadowland magazine, February 1920

Year	Title	Role	Notes
1915	Wanted: A Leading Lady	The Leading Lady	
1915	Their Quiet Honeymoon	Betty – 1st Newlywed	
1915	Where the Heather Blooms	Lady Mary	
1915	Love and a Savage	Betty	
1915	Some Chaperone	Betty – the 1st Daughter	
1916	Jed's Trip to the Fair	Lizzie	
1916	Mingling Spirits	Mrs. Newlywed	
1916	Her Steady Carfare	Betty	
1916	A Quiet Supper for Four	Mrs. Newlywed	
1916	When the Losers Won	Mrs. Newlywed	
1916	Her Friend, the Doctor	Mary West	
1916	Cupid Trims his Lordship	Betty – the Daughter	
1916	When Lizzie Disappeared		
1916	The Deacon's Waterloo	Betty – the Girl	
1916	Love and Vaccination	The Doctor's Sister	
1916	A Friend, But a Star Boarder		(unconfirmed)
1916	The Janitor's Busy Day	Betty Hammond	
1916	He Almost Eloped	Betty – Billie's Roommate	
1916	A Leap Year Tangle	Betty – One of the Girls – Eddie's Sweetheart	
1916	Eddie's Night Out	Betty Newlywed	
1916	The Newlyweds' Mix-Up	Mrs. Newlywed	
1916	Lem's College Career	Mary	
1916	Potts Bungles Again	Betty	
1916	He's a Devil	Betty – Eddie's Sweetheart	
1916	The Wooing of Aunt Jemima	Betty	
1916	Her Celluloid Hero	Betty – the Actor's Sweetheart	
1916	All Over a Stocking	The Stenographer	
1916	Wanted: A Husband	The Wife	
1916	Almost a Widow	Mrs. Gordon	
1916	The Browns See the Fair	The Train Passenger	
1916	His Baby	Betty – the Peach	
1916	Inoculating Hubby	Wifie	
1916	Those Primitive Days	Heela Hoola	
1916	The Making Over of Mother	Mrs. Newlywed	
1916	He Wouldn't Tip	The Pippin	
1916	That Doggone Bab	Wifie Parker	
1916	He Loved the Ladies	Mrs. Gordon	
1916	When Clubs Were Trumps	Wifie Parker	
1916	Dad's Masterpiece	Betty Morton	
1916	Nearly a Hero	Betty – the Sheriff's Daughter	
1916	A Brass-Buttoned Romance		
1916	Her Sun-Kissed Hero	The Peach	
1916	Some Kid		
1916	Sea Nymphs	Betty – the Wife	
1916	Hist! At Six O'Clock	Tillie de Vamp	
1916	Cupid's Uppercut	Betty	
1916	Lovers and Lunatics	Betty Grey	
1917	Her Crooked Career	The Girl	
1917	Her Friend, the Chauffeur	The Girl	
1917	Small Change	The Girl	
1917	Hubby's Night Out	Wifey	
1917	Out for the Coin		
1917	As Luck Would Have It		
1917	Sauce for the Goose		
1917	Suspended Sentence		
1917	Father's Bright Idea		
1917	His Last Pill		
1917	Those Wedding Bells		
1917	Almost a Scandal		
1917	A Bold, Bad Knight		
1917	Five Little Widows	Betty Morgan	
1917	Down by the Sea		
1917	Won in a Cabaret		
1917	A Smoky Love Affair		
1917	Crazy by Proxy		
1917	Betty's Big Idea		
1917	Almost a Bigamist		
1917	Love and Locksmiths		
1917	Nearly a Papa	Mrs. Gordon	
1917	Almost Divorced		
1917	Betty Wakes Up	Sally	
1917	Their Seaside Tangle		
1917	Help! Help! Police!		
1917	Cupid's Camouflage	Betty	
1918	Many a Slip		
1918	Whose Wife?		
1918	Circumstantial Evidence		
1918	Here Comes the Groom		(unconfirmed)
1918	Somebody's Baby		
1918	Betty's Adventure	Betty	
1918	Never Surprise Your Wife		
1918	All Dressed Up		
1918	The Sheriff	School teacher	
1922	A Trip to Paramountown	Herself	
1931	Hollywood Halfbacks	Herself	
1934	No Sleep on the Deep	Mrs. Eldridge	
1934	The Watchman Takes a Wife	Molly Clyde	

== Features ==
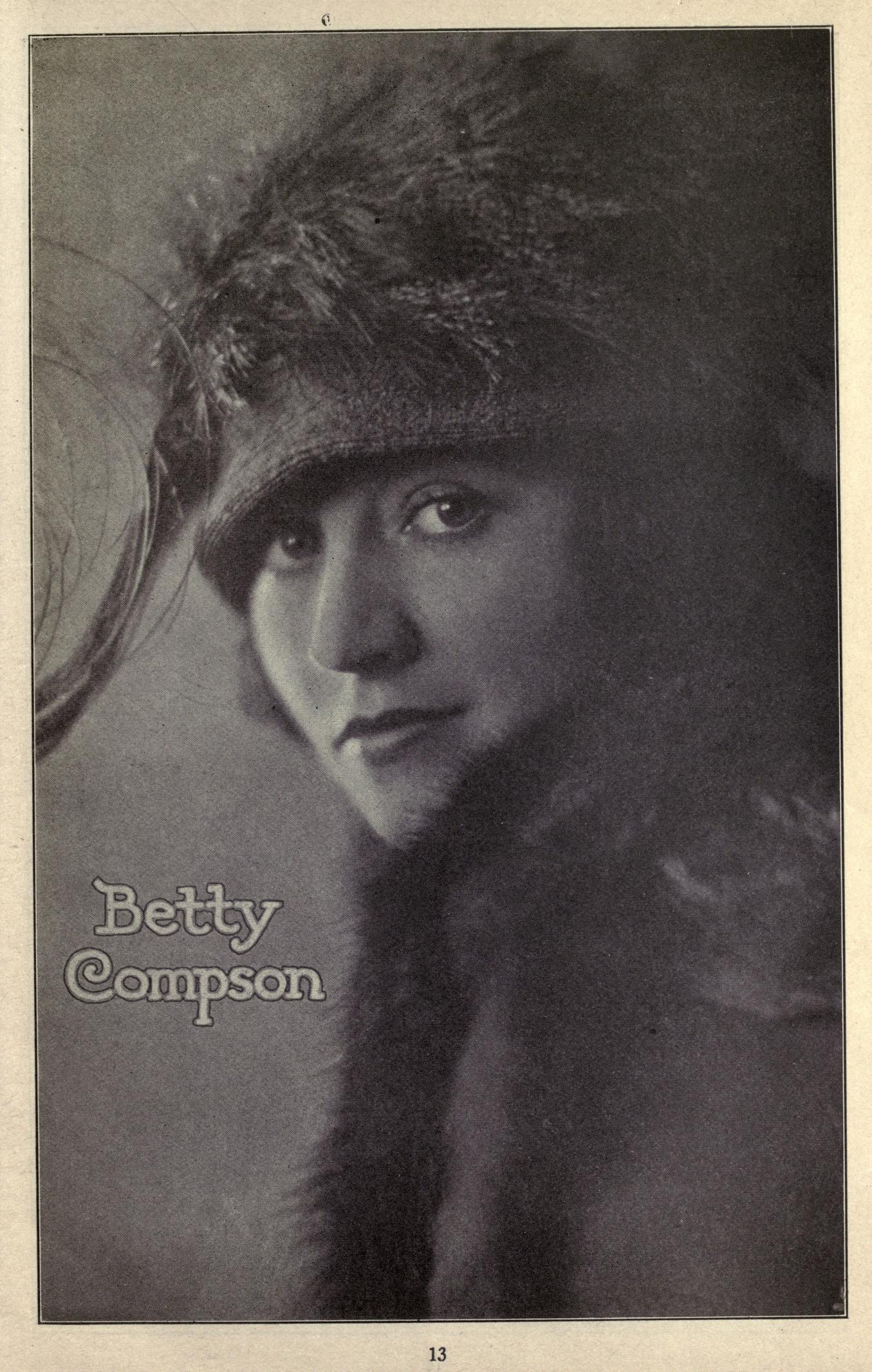
Betty Compson, 1921

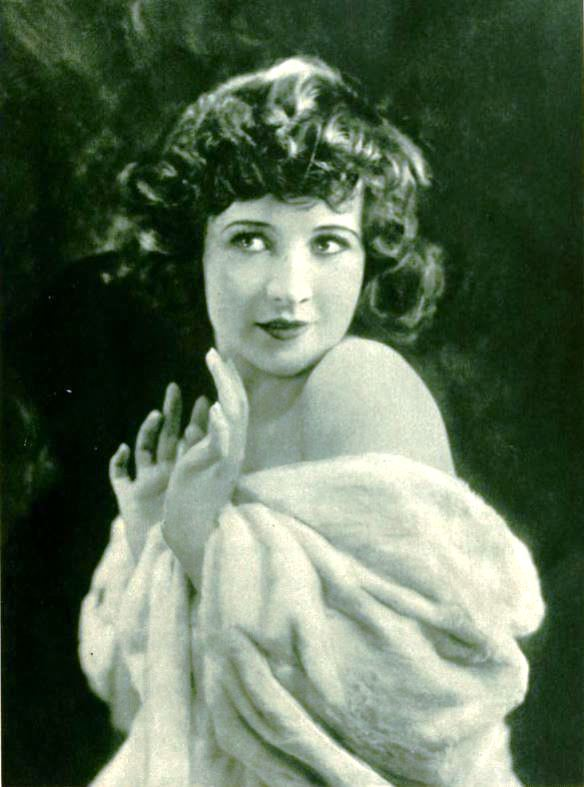
Betty Compson, 1921

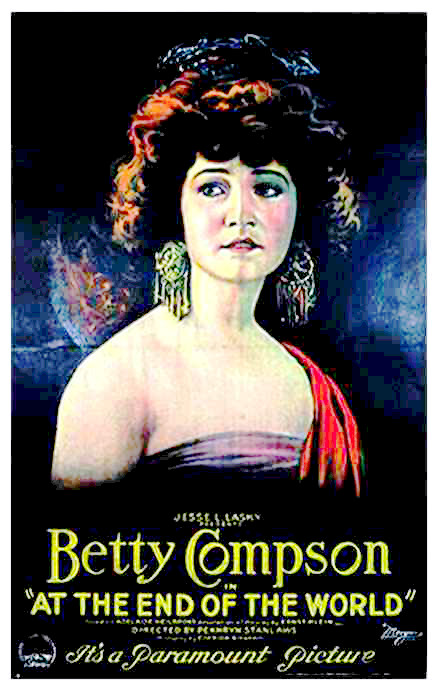
At the End of the World 1921

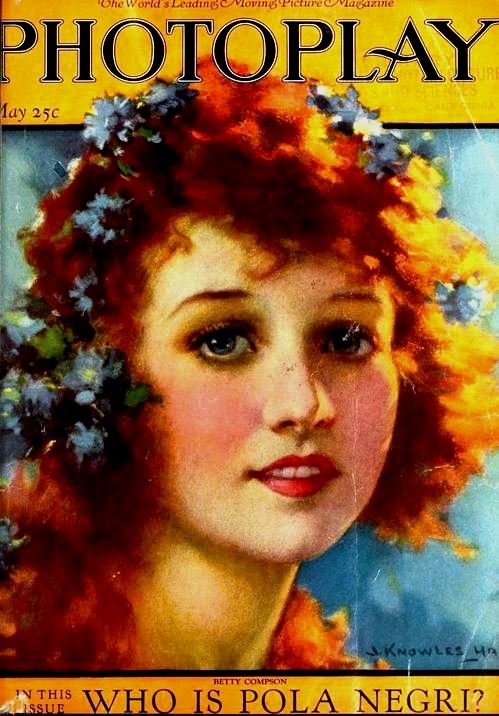
Photoplay magazine cover June 1922.

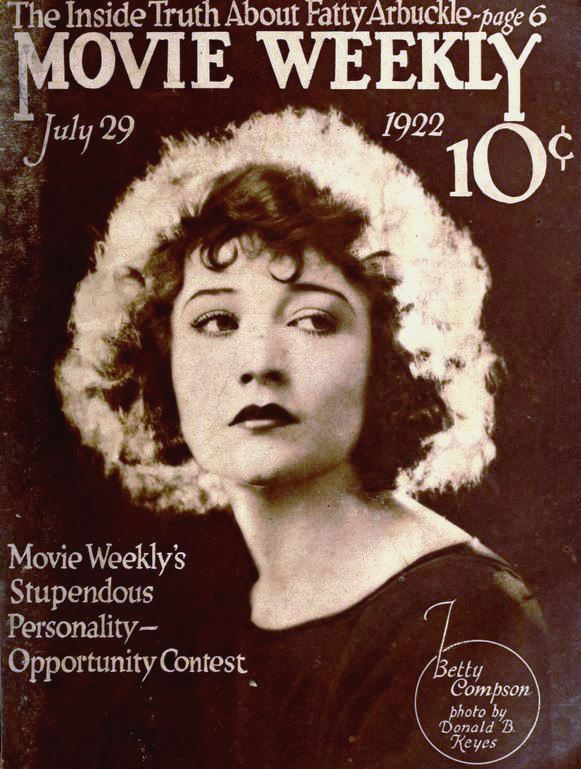
Movie Weekly July 29, 1922

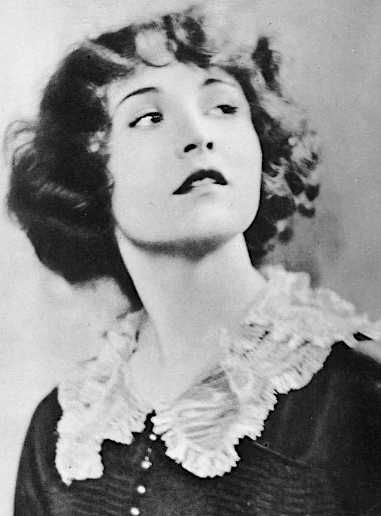
The Rustle of Silk 1923

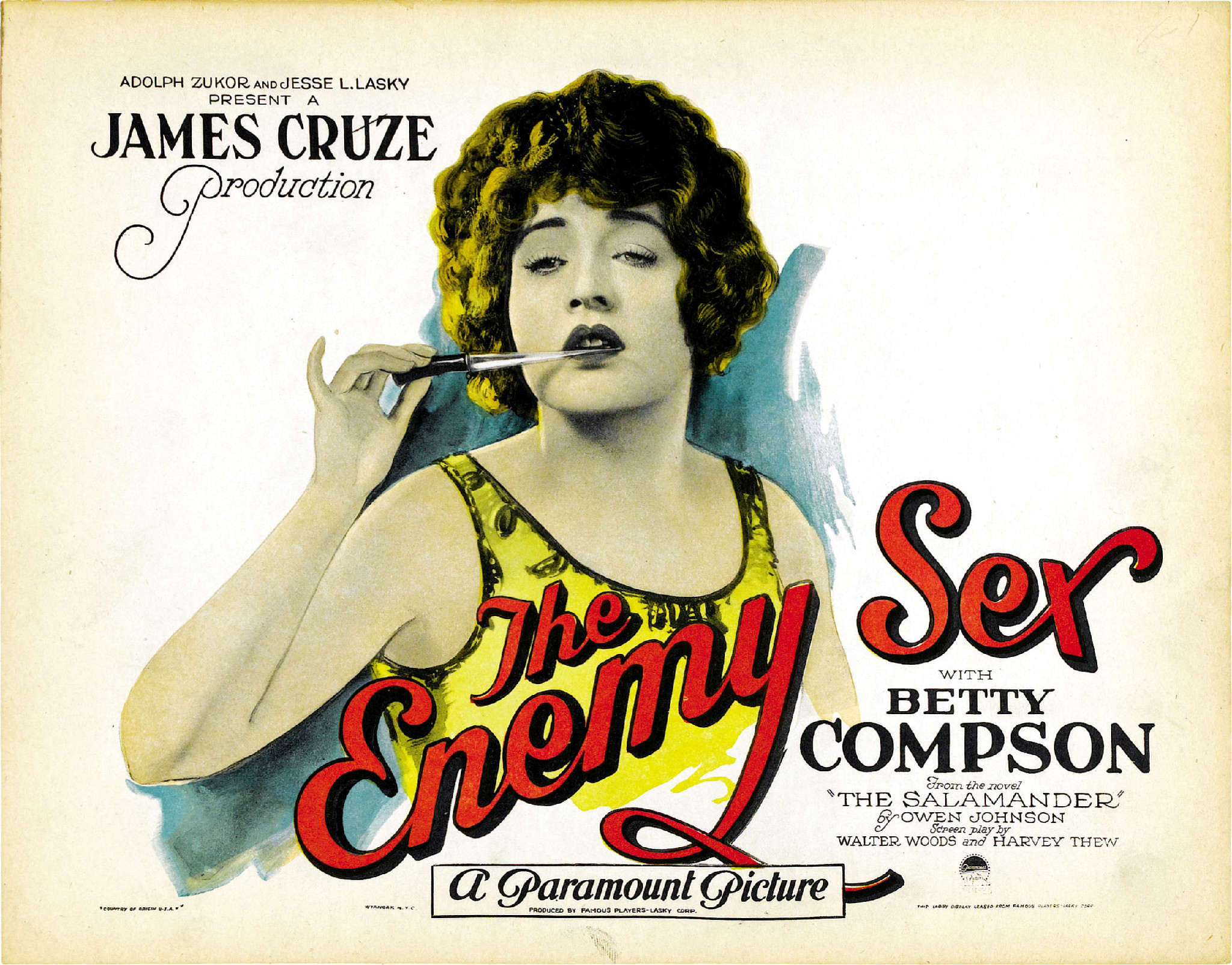
The Enemy Sex lobby card, 1924

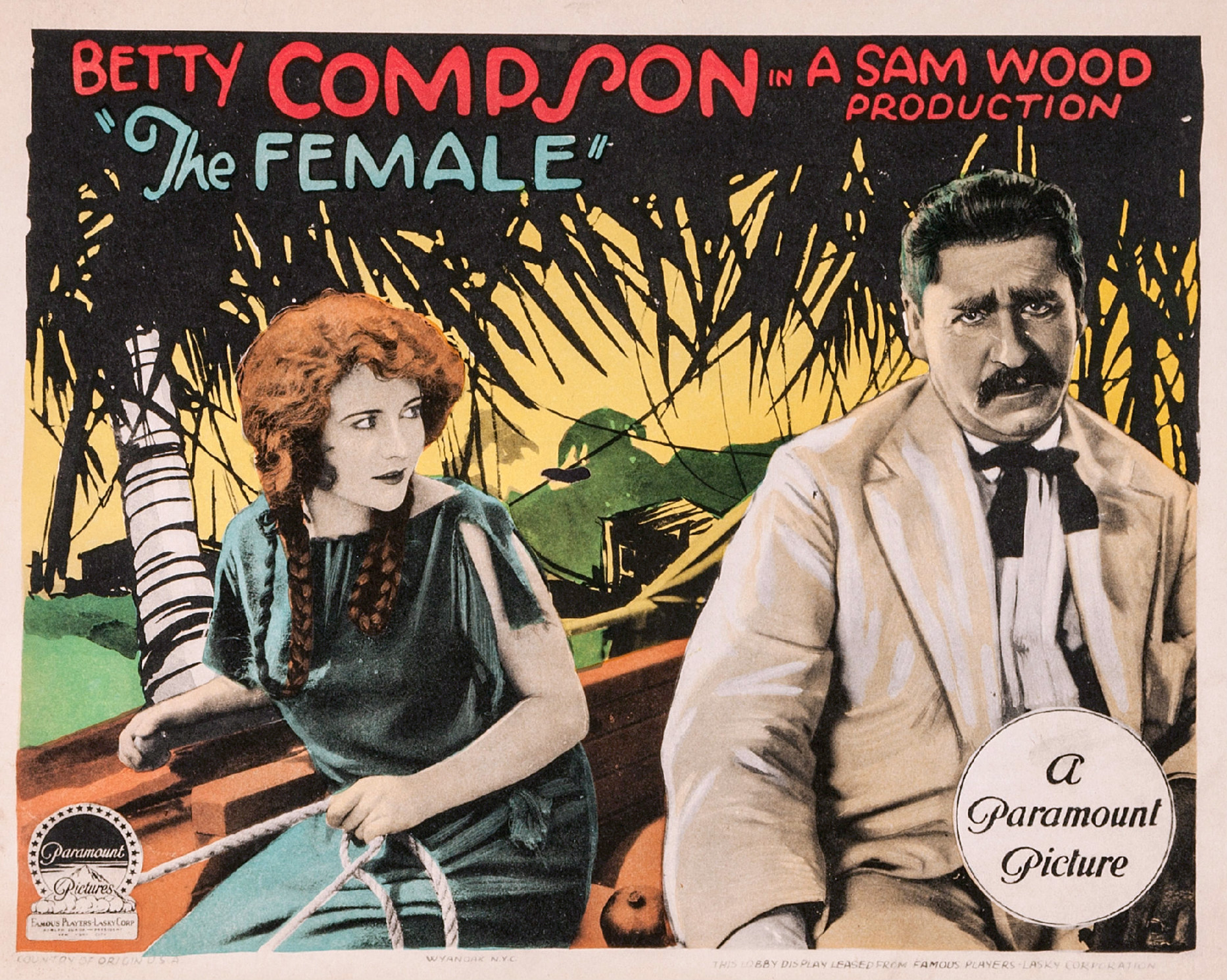
The Female, lobby card, 1924

=== Silent Films: 1918–1929 ===
Year	Title	Role	Studio(s) / Distributor(s)	Notes
1918	The Border Raiders	Rose Hardy	Pathé Exchange	Copy held at the Centre national du cinéma et de l'image animée
1919	Terror of the Range	Thelma Grant	Pathé Exchange	Film serial Lost film
1919	The Prodigal Liar	Hope Deering		Lost film
1919	The Light of Victory	Jane Ravenslee	Bluebird Photoplays Universal Film Manufacturing Company	Lost film
1919	The Little Diplomat	Phyllis Dare	Pathé Exchange	Lost film
1919	The Devil's Trail	Rose	World Film Company	Lost film
1919	The Miracle Man	Rose	Paramount Famous Players-Lasky	Lost film Two fragments survive
1921	Prisoners of Love	Blanche Davis	Goldwyn Pictures	Lost film Also produced
1921	For Those We Love	Bernice Arnold	Goldwyn Pictures	Lost film Also produced
1921	At the End of the World	Cherry O'Day	Paramount Famous Players-Lasky	Copy held at the Gosfilmofond Russian Archive
1921	Ladies Must Live	Christine Bleeker	Paramount Famous Players-Lasky	Lost film
1921	The Little Minister	Lady Babbie	Paramount Famous Players-Lasky	
1922	The Law and the Woman	Margaret Rolfe	Paramount Famous Players-Lasky	Lost film
1922	The Green Temptation	Genelle/Coralyn/Joan Parker	Paramount Famous Players-Lasky	Lost film
1922	Over the Border	Jen Galbriath	Paramount Famous Players-Lasky	Lost film
1922	Always the Woman	Celia Thaxter	Goldwyn Pictures	An incomplete copy is held at the UCLA Film & Television Archive
1922	The Bonded Woman	Angela Gaskell	Paramount Famous Players-Lasky	Copy held at the Gosfilmofond Russian Archive
1922	To Have and to Hold	Lady Jocelyn Leigh	Paramount Famous Players-Lasky	Lost film
1922	Kick In	Molly Brandon	Paramount Famous Players-Lasky	Copy held at the Library of Congress. (*This is debatable as some historians say this is an error and the film is still lost.)
1923	The White Flower	Konia Markham	Paramount Famous Players-Lasky	Lost film
1923	The Rustle of Silk	Lala De Breeze	Paramount Famous Players-Lasky	Lost film
1923	The Woman with Four Faces	Elizabeth West	Paramount Famous Players-Lasky	Lost film
1923	Hollywood	Herself	Paramount Famous Players-Lasky	Lost film
1923	Woman to Woman	Louise Boucher/Deloryse	Woolf & Freedman Film Service	Lost film
1923	The Royal Oak	Lady Mildred Cholmondeley	Stoll Pictures	Lost film
1924	The Stranger	Peggy Bowlin	Paramount Famous Players-Lasky	Lost film
1924	Miami	Joan Bruce	W. W. Hodkinson	Lost film
1924	Dangerous Virtue		Balcon, Freedman & Saville	
1924	The White Shadow	Nancy Brent/Georgina Brent	Woolf & Freedman	Incomplete film
1924	The Enemy Sex	Dodo Baxter	Paramount Famous Players-Lasky	Copy held at the Library of Congress
1924	The Female	Dalla	Paramount Famous Players-Lasky	Lost film
1924	Ramshackle House	Pen Broome	Producers Distributing Corporation	Lost film
1924	The Fast Set	Margaret Stone	Paramount Famous Players-Lasky	Lost film
1924	The Garden of Weeds	Dorothy Delbridge	Paramount Famous Players-Lasky	Lost film
1925	Locked Doors	Mrs. Norman 'Mary Reid' Carter	Paramount Famous Players-Lasky	Lost film
1925	New Lives for Old	Olympe	Paramount Famous Players-Lasky	Lost film
1925	Eve's Secret	Eve	Paramount Famous Players-Lasky	Copy held at the Library of Congress
1925	Beggar on Horseback	Princess in Pantomime	Paramount Famous Players-Lasky	Incomplete copy held at the Library of Congress
1925	Paths to Paradise	Molly	Paramount Famous Players-Lasky	Incomplete copy held at George Eastman Museum
1925	The Pony Express	Molly Jones	Paramount Famous Players-Lasky	
1925	Counsel for the Defense	Katherine West	Associated Exhibitions	Lost film
1926	The Palace of Pleasure	Lola Montez	Fox Film Corporation	Lost film
1926	The Wise Guy	Hula Kate	First National Pictures	Copy held at the National Archives of Canada
1926	The Belle of Broadway	Marie Duval/The Young Adele	Columbia Pictures	Copy held at the Library of Congress
1927	The Ladybird	Diane Wyman	Chadwick Pictures	Copy held at the Library of Congress
1927	Say It with Diamonds	Betty Howard	Chadwick Pictures	Copies held at the Library of Congress and George Eastman House
1927	Temptations of a Shop Girl	Ruth Harrington	Chadwick Pictures	Lost film
1927	Love Me and the World Is Mine	Mitzel	Universal Pictures	Copies held at the Cinematheque Royale de Belgique and Danish Film Institute
1927	Cheating Cheaters	Nan Carey	Universal Pictures	Lost film
1928	The Big City	Helen	Metro-Goldwyn-Mayer	Lost film; Trailer survives
1928	The Desert Bride	Diane Duval	Columbia Pictures	
1928	The Masked Angel	Betty	Chadwick Pictures	Lost film
1928	Life's Mockery	Kit Miller/Isabelle Fullerton	Chadwick Pictures	Copy held at the Centre national du cinéma et de l'image animée
1928	Court Martial	Belle Starr	Columbia Pictures	Preserved at the Museum of Modern Art; Segments filmed in Technicolor but no longer survive
1928	The Docks of New York	Mae	Paramount Famous Players-Lasky	
1929	Scarlet Seas	Rose	First National Pictures	Copy held at the Cineteca Italiana

=== Sound Films: 1928–1948 ===
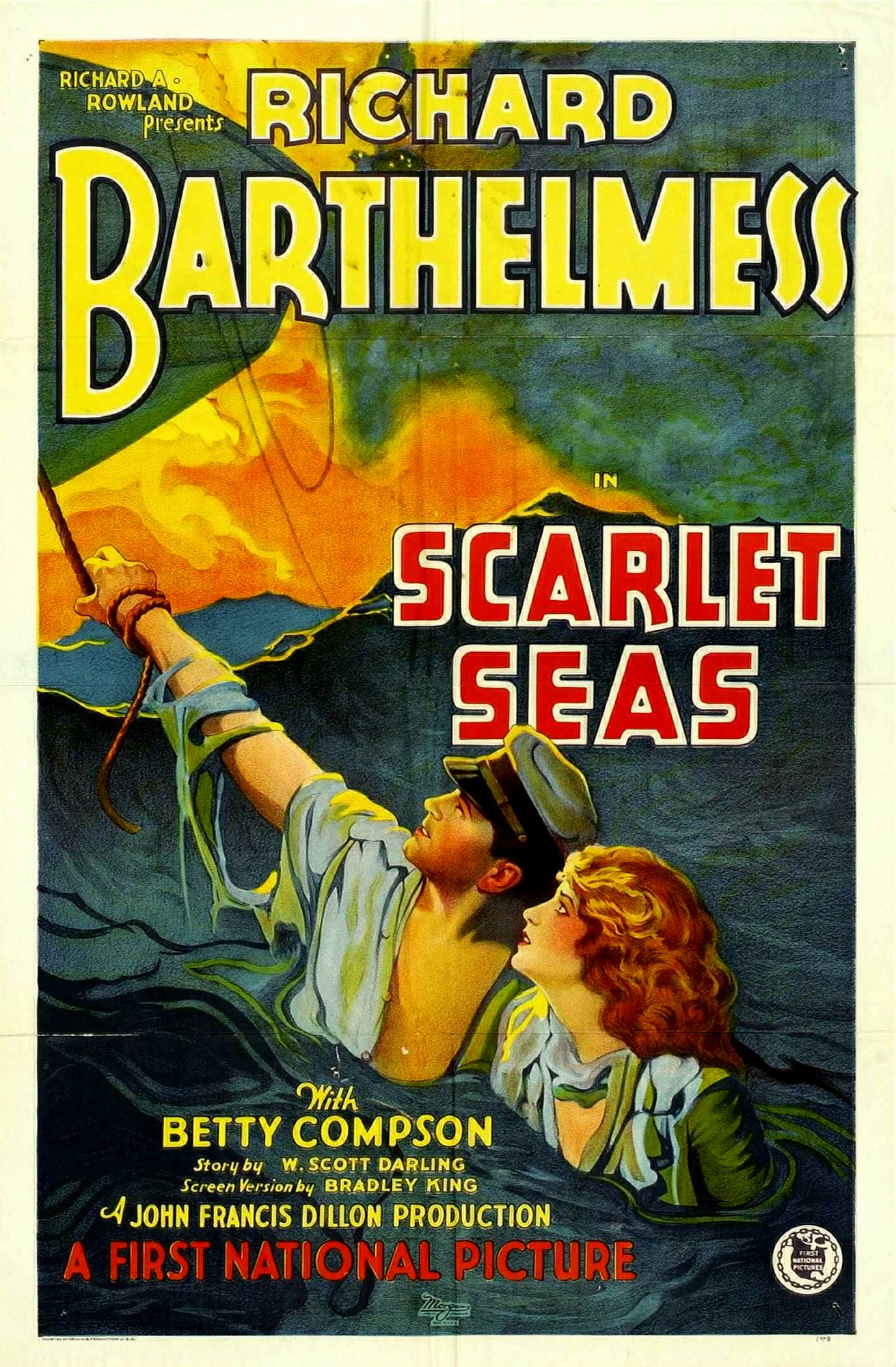
Scarlet Seas, 1928, released with music and sound effects

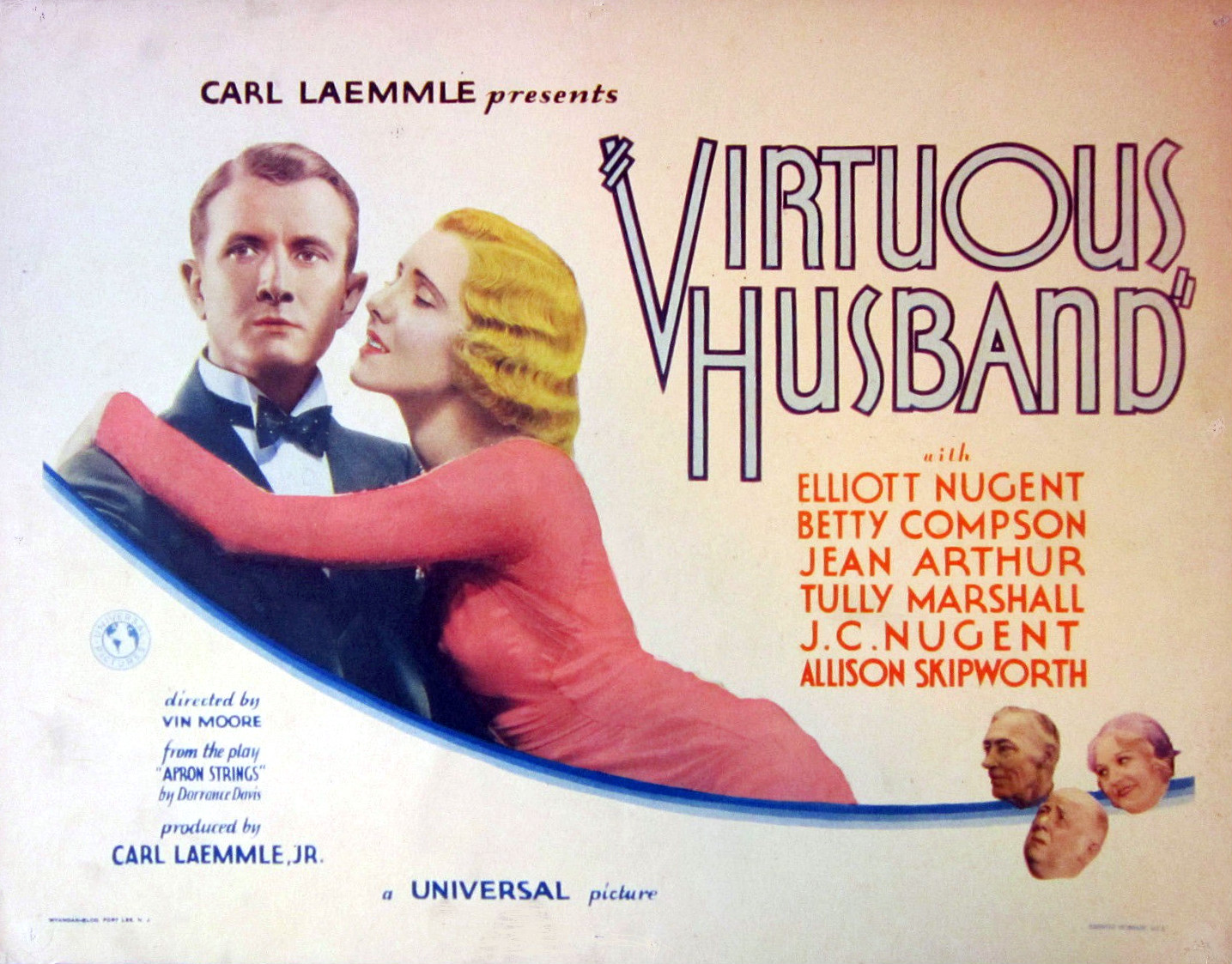
The Virtuous Husband, 1931

Year	Title	Role	Studio(s) / Distributor(s)	Notes
1928	The Barker	Carrie	First National Pictures	Part-talkie; Copy held at the UCLA Film and Television Archive; Nomination—Academy Award for Best Actress
1929	Weary River	Alice Gray	First National Pictures	Part-talkie
1929	On with the Show!	Nita	Warner Bros.	Filmed in Technicolor;first all-talking, all-color picture; survives in black and white, color fragments exist
1929	The Time, the Place and the Girl	Doris Ward	Warner Bros.	Lost film Soundtrack exists
1929	Street Girl	Frederika Joyzelle	RKO Radio Pictures	First film made by RKO
1929	Skin Deep	Sadie Rogers	Warner Bros.	Lost film Soundtrack survives
1929	The Great Gabbo	Mary	Sono Art-World Wide Pictures	Originally contained sequences in Multicolor
1929	Woman to Woman	Deloryce/Lola	Woolf & Freedman Film Service	
1929	The Show of Shows	Herself	Warner Bros.	Originally shot in Technicolor
1929	Blaze o' Glory	Helen Williams	Sono Art-World Wide Pictures	Lost film; Soundtrack survives
1930	The Case of Sergeant Grischa	Babka	RKO Radio Pictures	Lost film
1930	Isle of Escape	Stella	Warner Bros.	Lost film Fragment totaling 40 seconds survives
1930	Those Who Dance	Kitty	Warner Bros.	
1930	The Czar of Broadway	Connie Colton	Universal Pictures	Copy held at the Library of Congress
1930	Midnight Mystery	Sally Wayne	RKO Radio Pictures	
1930	Inside the Lines	Jane Gershon	RKO Radio Pictures	
1930	The Spoilers	Cherry Malotte	Paramount Pictures	
1930	She Got What She Wanted	Mahyna	Tiffany Pictures	Lost film
1930	The Boudoir Diplomat	Helene	Universal Pictures	
1931	The Lady Refuses	June	RKO Radio Pictures	
1931	The Virtuous Husband	Inez Wakefield	Universal Pictures	
1931	Three Who Loved	Helga Larson Hanson	RKO Radio Pictures	
1931	The Gay Diplomat	Baroness Alma Corri	RKO Radio Pictures	
1932	The Silver Lining	Kate Flynn	United Artists	
1932	Guilty or Not Guilty	Maizie	Monogram Pictures	Lost film
1933	West of Singapore	Lou	Monogram Pictures	Lost film Fragment totaling 2 minutes survive
1933	Destination Unknown	Ruby Smith	Universal Pictures	
1933	Notorious But Nice	Millie Sprague	Chesterfield Pictures	
1935	Manhattan Butterfly		Cameo Pictures	
1935	False Pretenses	Clarissa Stanhope	Chesterfield Pictures	
1936	August Weekend	Ethel Ames	Chesterfield Pictures	
1936	Laughing Irish Eyes	Molly	Republic Pictures	
1936	The Millionaire Kid	Gloria Neville	Reliable Pictures	
1936	The Drag-Net	Mollie Cole	Burroughs-Tarzan Pictures	
1936	Hollywood Boulevard	Betty	Paramount Pictures	
1936	Bulldog Edition	Billie Blake aka Aggie	Republic Pictures	
1936	Killer at Large	Kate	Columbia Pictures	
1936	Two Minutes to Play	'Fluff' Harding	Victory Pictures	
1937	Circus Girl	Carlotta	Reliable Pictures	
1937	God's Country and the Man	Roxey Moore	Monogram Pictures	
1937	Federal Bullets	Sue, Gang Moll	Monogram Pictures	
1938	Blondes at Work	Blanche Revelle	Warner Bros.	
1938	The Port of Missing Girls	Chicago	Monogram Pictures	
1938	A Slight Case of Murder	Loretta	Warner Bros.	
1938	Torchy Blane in Panama	Kitty	Warner Bros.	
1938	Two Gun Justice	Kate	Monogram Pictures	
1938	The Beloved Brat	Eleanor Sparks	Warner Bros.	uncredited
1938	Religious Racketeers	Ada Bernard		
1938	Under the Big Top	Marie	Monogram Pictures	
1939	Hotel Imperial	Soubrette	Paramount Pictures	uncredited
1939	News Is Made at Night	Kitty Truman	20th Century Fox	
1939	Cowboys from Texas	Belle Starkey	Republic Pictures	
1940	Cafe Hostess	Cafe Hostess	Columbia Pictures	Uncredited
1940	Strange Cargo	Suzanne	Metro-Goldwyn-Mayer	Uncredited
1940	Mad Youth	Lucy Morgan	Willis Kent Production	
1940	Laughing at Danger	Mrs. Van Horn	Monogram Pictures	
1941	Mr. & Mrs. Smith	Gertie	RKO Radio Pictures	
1941	Roar of the Press	Mrs. Thelma Tate	Monogram Pictures	
1941	Invisible Ghost	Mrs. Kessler	Monogram Pictures	
1941	Zis Boom Bah	Mame	Monogram Pictures	Uncredited
1941	Escort Girl	Ruth Ashley		
1943	Danger! Women at Work	Madame Sappho	Producers Releasing Corporation	
1946	Claudia and David		20th Century Fox	Uncredited
1946	Her Adventurous Night	Miss Spencer	Universal Pictures	
1947	Hard Boiled Mahoney	Selena Webster	Monogram Pictures	
1947	Second Chance	Mrs. Davenport	20th Century Fox	
1948	Here Comes Trouble	Martha Blake	United Artists	
