= She Got What She Wanted =

1930 film directed by James Cruze

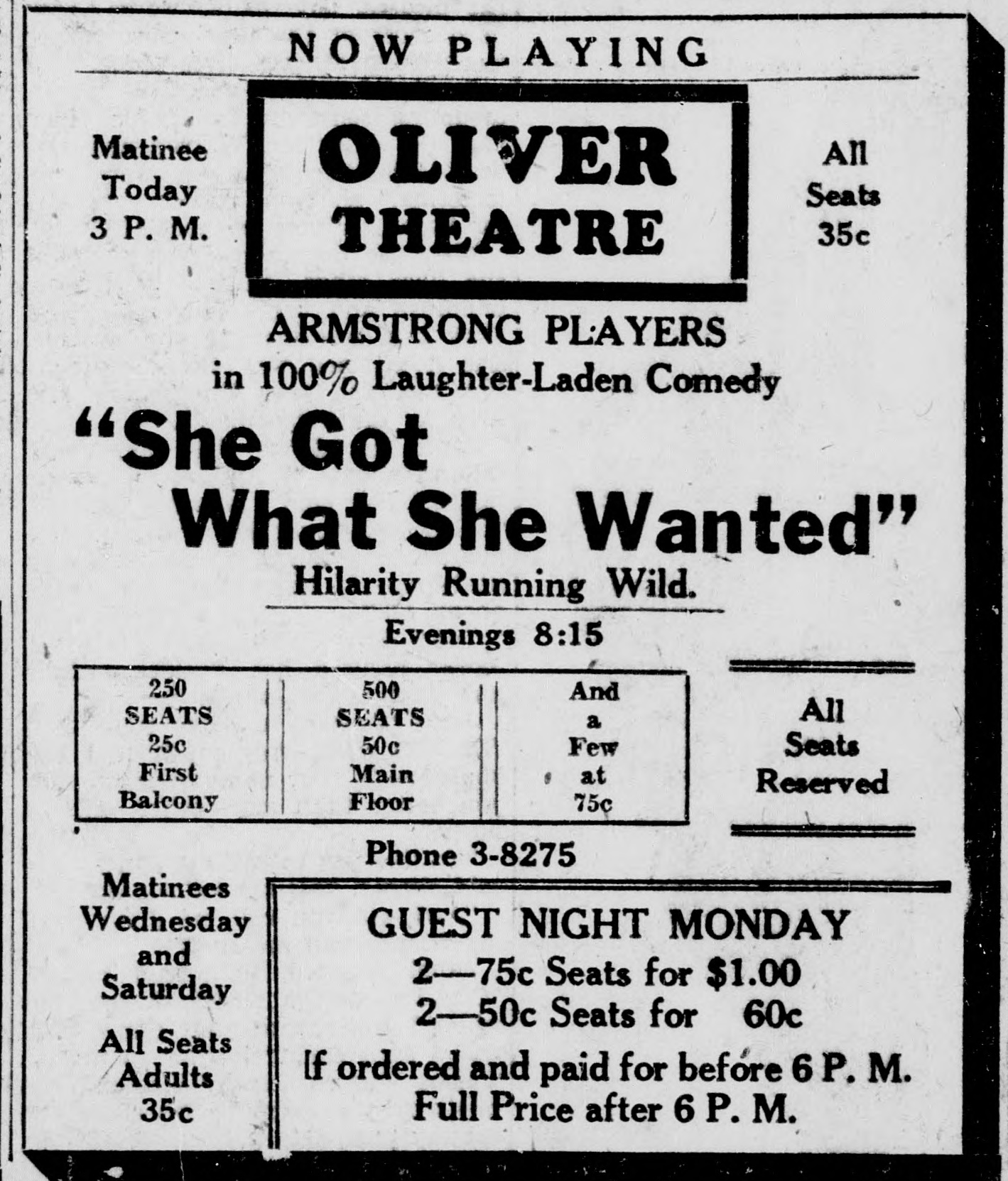
- Contemporary advertisement
- Directed by: James Cruze
- Written by: George Rosener (story, screenplay); James Cruze (screenplay); Lee Tracy (screenplay)
- Produced by: James Cruze; Samuel Zierler
- Starring: Betty Compson
- Cinematography: Charles Schoenbaum
- Distributed by: Tiffany Pictures
- Release date: December 18, 1930
- Running time: 81 minutes
- Country: United States
- Language: English

She Got What She Wanted is a 1930 American pre-Code early talking film comedy-drama directed by James Cruze and starring his actress wife Betty Compson. The film was made for Tiffany Pictures with Cruze and Compson having recently completed The Great Gabbo (1929).

== Cast ==
- Betty Compson as Mahyna
- Lee Tracy as Eddie
- Alan Hale as Dave
- Gaston Glass as Boris
- Dorothy Christy as Olga
- Fred Kelsey as Dugan

== Preservation status ==
She Got What She Wanted is now considered a lost film.

== See also ==
- List of lost films
- Betty Compson filmography
