= Ladies Must Live (1921 film) =

1921 film directed by George Loane Tucker

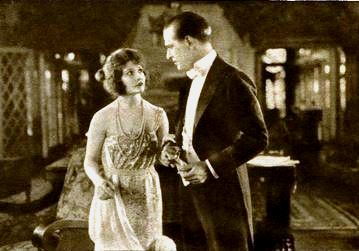
- Still with Betty Compson (Screenland, January 1922)
- Directed by: George Loane Tucker
- Written by: George Loane Tucker (adaptation)
- Based on: Ladies Must Live; 1917 novel by Alice Duer Miller
- Starring: Betty Compson; Mahlon Hamilton; Leatrice Joy; John Gilbert
- Cinematography: Ernest Palmer; Phil Rosen
- Production company: Famous Players–Lasky / Mayflower Pictures
- Distributed by: Paramount Pictures
- Release date: October 30, 1921 (United States)
- Running time: 80 minutes
- Country: United States
- Language: Silent (English intertitles)

Ladies Must Live is a 1921 American silent societal drama film directed by George Loane Tucker and released by Paramount Pictures. It was the last directorial effort of George Loane Tucker and was released four months after his death. Betty Compson stars along with Leatrice Joy, John Gilbert and Mahlon Hamilton. It was one of the few instances where future husband and wife Joy and Gilbert appeared in the same film.

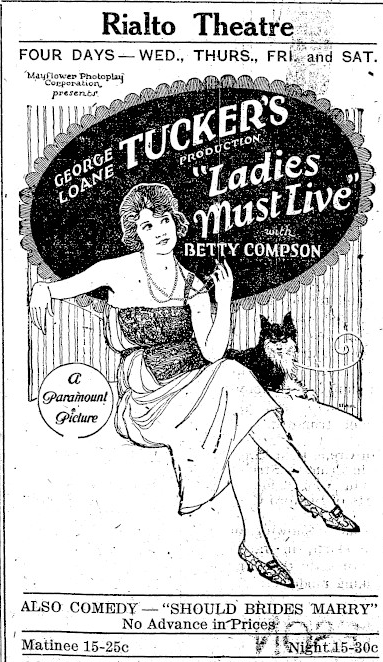
1922 advertisement

== Cast ==
- Robert Ellis as Anthony Mulvain
- Mahlon Hamilton as Ralph Lincourt
- Betty Compson as Christine Bleeker
- Leatrice Joy as Barbara
- Hardee Kirkland as William Hollins
- Gibson Gowland as Michael Le Prim
- John Gilbert as The Gardener
- Cleo Madison as Mrs. Lincourt
- Snitz Edwards as Edward Barron
- Lucille Hutton as Nell Martin
- Lule Warrenton as Nora Flanagan
- William V. Mong as Max Bleeker
- Jack McDonald as The Butler
- Marcia Manon as Nancy
- Arnold Gray as Ned Klegg (credited as Arnold Gregg)
- Dorothy Cumming (uncredited)
- Richard Arlen (uncredited)

== Preservation ==
Ladies Must Live is currently presumed lost. In February of 2021, the film was cited by the National Film Preservation Board on their Lost U.S. Silent Feature Films list.

The Library of Congress Catalog of Holdings lists only the 1940 Warner Brothers film of the same title.

== See also ==
- Betty Compson filmography
- List of lost films
