= Skin Deep (1929 film) =

1929 film

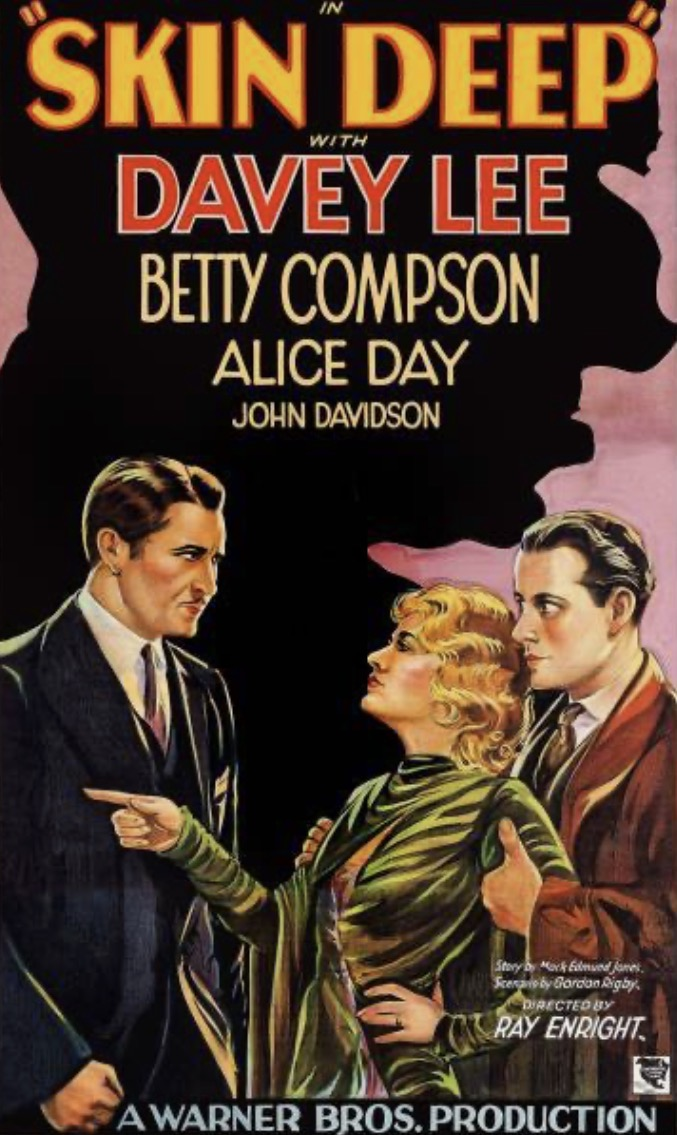
- Theatrical release poster
- Directed by: Ray Enright
- Written by: Gordon Rigby (writer); De Leon Anthony (titles)
- Based on: Lucky Damage by Marc Edmund Jones
- Produced by: Warner Brothers
- Starring: Monte Blue; Betty Compson
- Cinematography: Barney McGill
- Edited by: George Marks
- Distributed by: Warner Bros. Pictures
- Release dates: September 7, 1929 (sound version); November 2, 1929 (silent version)
- Running time: 64 minutes
- Country: United States
- Language: English

Skin Deep is a 1929 American sound (All-Talking) pre-Code drama film directed by Ray Enright and starring Monte Blue. It was produced and distributed by Warner Bros. Pictures. It was also released in the U.S. in a silent version for theaters not equipped yet with sound. The film is a remake of a 1922 associated First National silent film of the same name directed by Lambert Hillyer and starring Milton Sills.

== Plot ==
Gangster Joe Daley marries a chorus girl named Sadie, and decides to give up the rackets and surrender $100,000 to the DA . For this she turns on him and goes in with Blackie Culver, a rival gang lord, and they set Joe up to take the rap for stealing it. Joe is sent to prison, still unaware of Sadie's betrayal. She makes Joe believe the DA wants her, and he must save her by escaping. He does, and injures his face in the break out. Farm girl Elsa Langdon has her surgeon father remake his face. Now unrecognizable, Joe learns of Sadie's plot. and returns to the city.

== Cast ==
- Monte Blue as Joe Daley
- Betty Compson as Sadie Rogers
- Davey Lee as District Attorney Carlson's Son
- Alice Day as Elsa Langdon
- John Davidson as "Blackie" Culver
- John Bowers as District Attorney Carlson
- Georgie Stone as "Dippy"
- Tully Marshall as Dr. Bruce Landon
- Robert Perry as Tim

== Music ==
The film featured a theme song entitled "I Came To You" which was composed by Con Conrad, Archie Gottler and Sidney Mitchell. The song was sung by Betty Compson in the film. The song is played frequently as background music by the Vitaphone orchestra throughout the film.

== Preservation ==
All copies of this film are now lost. However, the Vitaphone soundtrack, of music and effects, survive for the International Sound Version.

== See also ==
- List of early sound feature films (1926–1929)
- List of early Warner Bros. sound and talking features
- Betty Compson filmography
