= The Bonded Woman =

1922 film by Phil Rosen

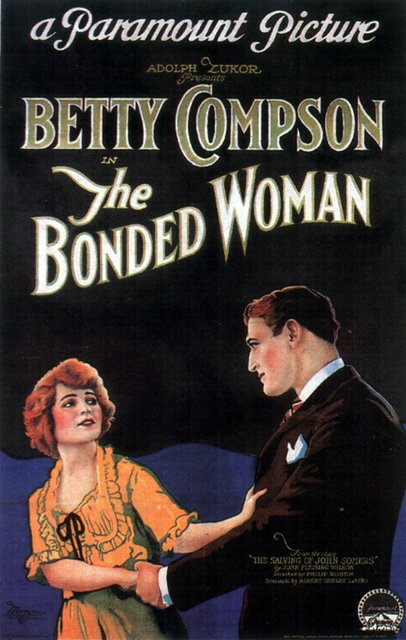
- Film poster
- Directed by: Phil Rosen
- Written by: Albert S. Le Vino (scenario)
- Based on: "The Saving of John Somers" by John Fleming Wilson
- Produced by: Adolph Zukor; Jesse L. Lasky
- Starring: Betty Compson; John Bowers; Richard Dix
- Cinematography: James Van Trees
- Distributed by: Paramount Pictures
- Release date: August 21, 1922
- Running time: 6 reels (5,486 feet)
- Country: United States
- Language: Silent (English intertitles)

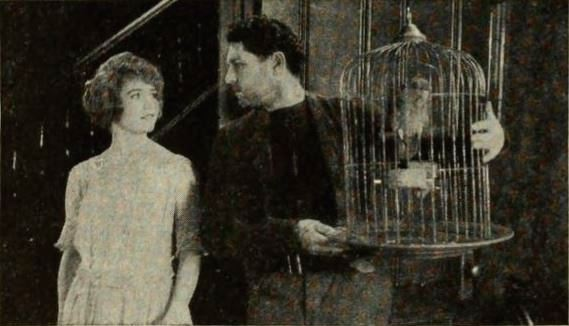
Film still with Compson and Bowers.

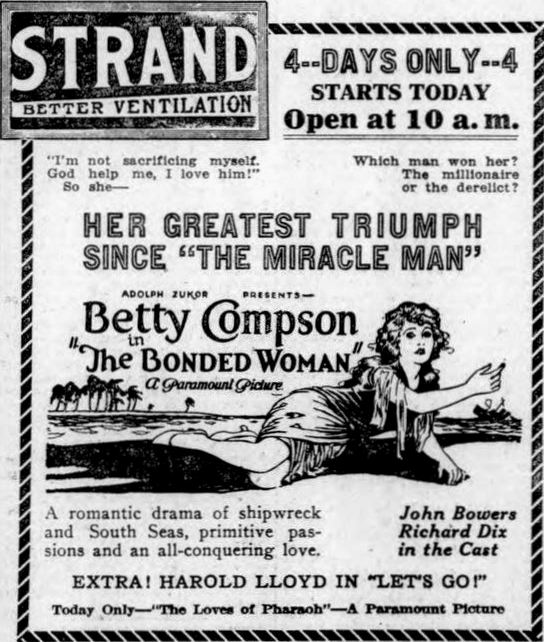
Newspaper advertisement.

The Bonded Woman is an extant 1922 American silent drama film produced by Famous Players–Lasky and distributed by Paramount Pictures. It was directed by Phil Rosen and stars Betty Compson, John Bowers, and Richard Dix. The film was adapted for the screen by Albert Shelby Le Vino from the short story "The Salving of John Somers" by John Fleming Wilson, which had originally been published in Everybody's Magazine in 1920.

== Cast ==
- Betty Compson as Angela Gaskell
- John Bowers as John Somers
- Richard Dix as Lee Marvin
- J. Farrell MacDonald as Captain Gaskell
- Ethel Wales as Lucita

== Preservation ==
A complete print of The Bonded Woman is held by Gosfilmofond in Moscow.
