= The Prodigal Liar =

1919 silent film

- Directed by: Thomas N. Heffron
- Written by: George Elwood Jenks
- Produced by: Jesse D. Hampton
- Starring: William Desmond; Betty Compson
- Production company: Jesse D. Hampton Productions
- Distributed by: Robertson-Cole Distributing Corporation
- Release date: February 17, 1919
- Running time: 5 reels
- Country: United States
- Languages: Silent; English intertitles

The Prodigal Liar is a 1919 American silent comedy film directed by Thomas N. Heffron and starring William Desmond and Betty Compson.

== Cast ==
- William Desmond as Percival Montgomery Edwards
- Betty Compson as Hope Deering
- Louis Morrison as Jim Rainey
- Walter Perry as Paddy Donohue
- Frank Lanning as Steve Logan

== Preservation ==
The Prodigal Liar is currently presumed lost. In February of 2021, the film was cited by the National Film Preservation Board on their Lost U.S. Silent Feature Films list.
