= Scarlet Seas =

1928 film

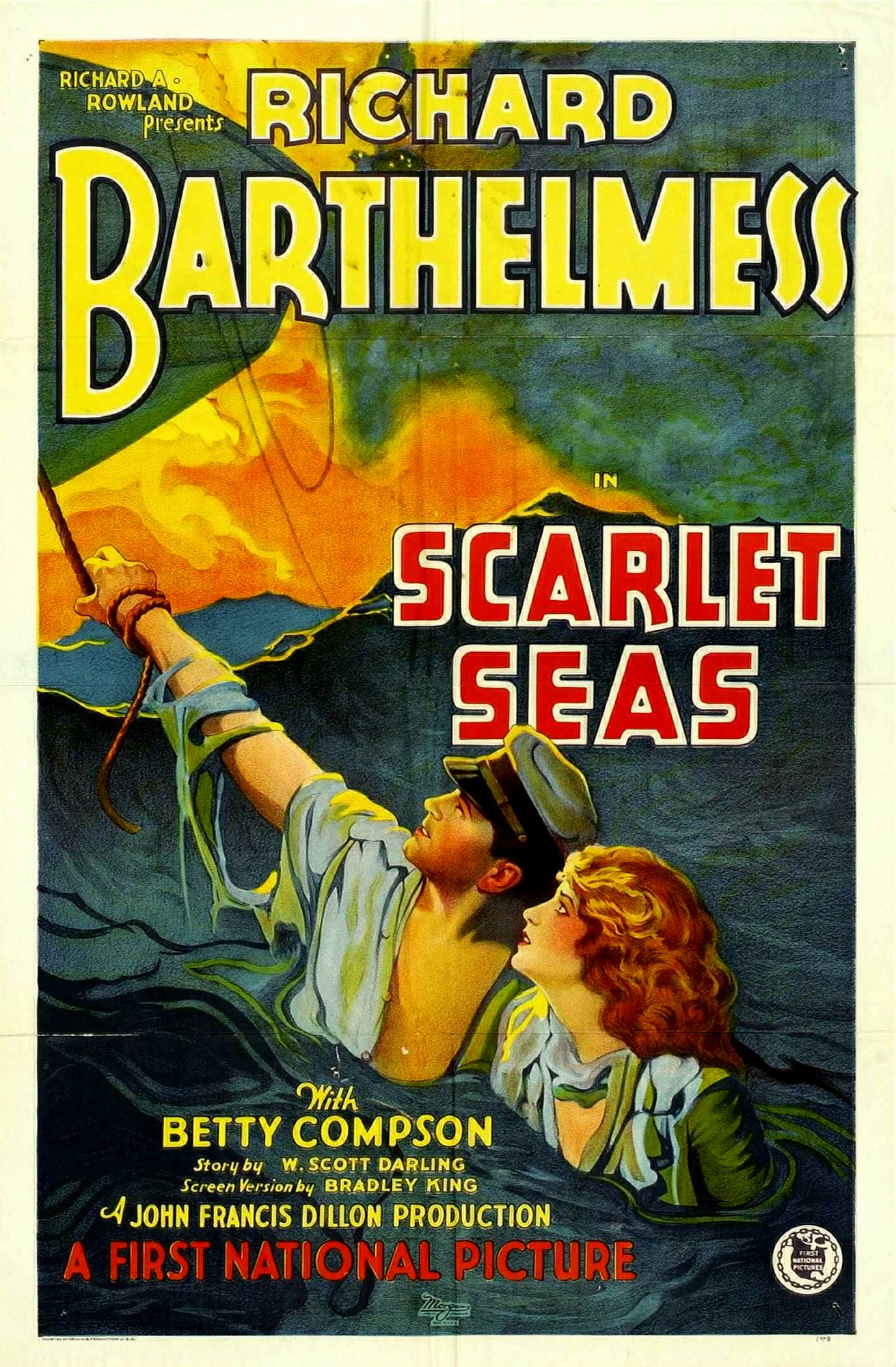
- Film poster
- Directed by: John Francis Dillon
- Written by: Bradley King (scenario); Louis Stevens (intertitles)
- Story by: W. Scott Darling
- Produced by: Richard A. Rowland
- Starring: Richard Barthelmess; Betty Compson; Loretta Young
- Cinematography: Sol Polito; Frank Bangs (still photography)
- Edited by: Jack Gardner; Edward Schroeder
- Music by: Karl Hajos
- Production company: First National Pictures
- Distributed by: Warner Bros. Pictures, Inc.
- Release date: January 12, 1929
- Running time: 7 reels (6,337 feet)
- Country: United States
- Languages: Sound (Synchronized) (English Intertitles)

Scarlet Seas is a surviving 1929 American synchronized sound romantic adventure film produced by Richard A. Rowland and distributed by First National Pictures. Although there is no audible dialogue, the film was released with a musical score with sound effects using the Vitaphone sound-on-disc recording process. The picture was directed by John Francis Dillon. It starred Richard Barthelmess, Betty Compson, and a teen-aged Loretta Young.

The story was written by W. Scott Darling.

== Plot ==
Steve Donkin is introduced as a stoic and embittered seaman, operating aboard the Southern Cross, a two-masted schooner engaged in smuggling narcotics off the coast of Apia. In Apia, he visits a disreputable café and begins a flirtation with Rose, the establishment's chief entertainer. Their interaction provokes the jealousy of Toomey, a violent seaman with a claim on Rose. Toomey instigates a fight, and his gang removes Donkin by force.

Later, Captain Barbour and his daughter Margaret, a young and innocent girl, are seen walking along the quay. The Captain rebukes Toomey for drunken conduct, prompting Toomey to accuse Rose of robbery. Captain Barbour brings the matter to the island commissioner, who gives Rose 24 hours to leave the territory. Seeking a means of escape, Rose persuades a sailor aboard the Southern Cross to let her on board during the night, and then convinces Donkin to allow her passage to Shanghai. Though Donkin is initially resistant and emotionally impenetrable, he consents.

During the voyage across the Pacific, a violent typhoon destroys the Southern Cross, leaving only three survivors: Donkin, Rose, and Johnson, a Swede. Adrift in an open boat, the trio face hunger, despair, and isolation. Rose turns to prayer; Johnson speaks of God, while Donkin bitterly denounces the idea of divine intervention. Driven mad by starvation, Johnson attempts to attack Donkin with a knife and is thrown overboard in self-defense.

In the aftermath, Donkin and Rose are drawn together by their shared suffering. Facing death, they experience a shift in their relationship, culminating in a declaration of love. Donkin—previously a skeptic—declares his belief in God. They are eventually rescued by a ship captained by Barbour, now under the control of a mutinous crew led by Toomey.

Upon boarding, Donkin is imprisoned in a cabin. Toomey threatens to have him thrown overboard in a canvas sack. In an effort to save Donkin, Rose uses flirtation to distract Toomey. Witnessing this, Donkin misunderstands her intentions and reverts to his earlier cynicism and mistrust.

On the second day aboard the vessel, Donkin encounters Margaret while attempting to escape from his confinement. Her kindness and purity stand in stark contrast to the harsh world he has known. Through her, Donkin comes to recognize the possibility of goodness and makes a decision to protect Margaret and Captain Barbour from the mutineers.

Rose, misinterpreting Donkin's attention to Margaret as romantic affection, becomes jealous. Eventually, Donkin and Toomey engage in a final, violent confrontation. Toomey fires a gun at Donkin, but Rose intervenes and takes the bullet in her side, saving him. Donkin overpowers Toomey.

In the wake of this act, Donkin realizes he was wrong in his judgments—about Rose, about Margaret, and about God. The narrative concludes with Rose's survival, Toomey's defeat, and Donkin's personal transformation, bringing the story to a redemptive and hopeful ending.

== Cast ==
- Richard Barthelmess as Steven Dunkin
- Betty Compson as Rose
- Loretta Young as Margaret Barbour
- James Bradbury Sr. as Johnson
- Jack Curtis as Toomey
- Knute Erickson as Captain Barbour

uncredited

- Shorty English as Sailor

== Music ==
The film featured a theme song entitled "Blossoms (That Bloom In the Moonlight)" which was composed by Ben Black and James Dietrich.

== Critical reception ==
A review in Harrison's Reports found that the film contains "offenses to logic", including the nimbleness of the hero and heroine as they climb a rope ladder despite having survived days of hunger and thirst and the way the hero easily overcomes "a giant", lifts him, and throws him overboard.

== Preservation ==
A print of Scarlet Seas is held by the Cineteca Italiana in Milan. However, the film was once considered a lost film.

== See also ==
- List of early sound feature films (1926–1929)
- South Seas genre
