= The Rustle of Silk =

1923 film by Herbert Brenon

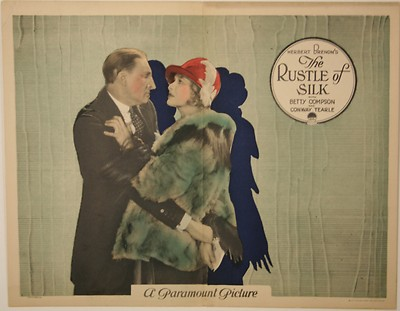
- Directed by: Herbert Brenon
- Written by: Sada Cowan; Ouida Bergère
- Based on: The Rustle of Silk by Cosmo Hamilton
- Produced by: Adolph Zukor; Jesse Lasky
- Starring: Betty Compson; Conway Tearle
- Cinematography: George R. Meyer; James Van Trees (additional photography)
- Distributed by: Paramount Pictures
- Release date: May 13, 1923
- Running time: 70 minutes
- Country: United States
- Language: Silent (English intertitles)

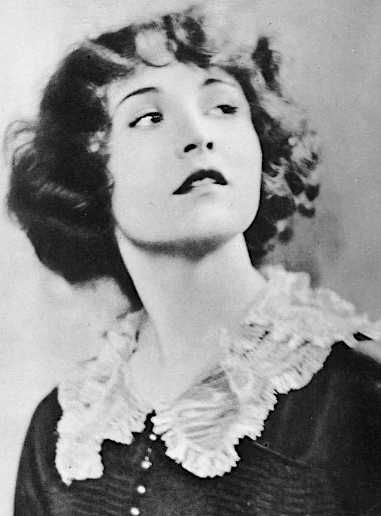

The Rustle of Silk is a 1923 American silent romantic drama film directed by Herbert Brenon and starring Betty Compson. It was produced by Famous Players–Lasky and distributed by Paramount Pictures. It is based on the 1922 novel by writer Cosmo Hamilton.

== Cast ==
- Betty Compson as Lala De Breeze
- Conway Tearle as Arthur Fallaray
- Cyril Chadwick as Paul Chalfon
- Anna Q. Nilsson as Lady Feo
- Leo White as Emil
- Charles A. Stevenson as Henry De Breeze
- Tempe Pigott as Mrs. De Breeze
- Frederick Esmelton as Blythe (*as Fred Esmelton)
- Anne Shirley as Girl (credited as Dawn O'Day)

== Preservation ==
The Rustle of Silk is currently presumed lost. In February of 2021, the film was cited by the National Film Preservation Board on their Lost U.S. Silent Feature Films list.
