= Prisoners of Love (1921 film) =

1921 film

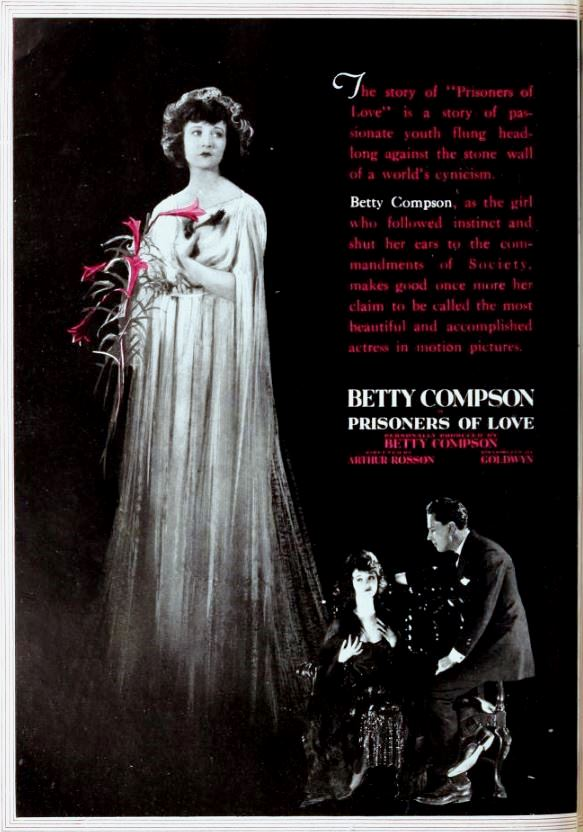
- Advertisement for the film from Exhibitors Herald, November 20, 1920.
- Directed by: Arthur Rosson
- Written by: Catherine Henry
- Produced by: Betty Compson
- Starring: Betty Compson
- Cinematography: Ernest Palmer
- Distributed by: Goldwyn Pictures
- Release date: January 1921
- Running time: 6 reels; 5,884 feet
- Country: United States
- Language: Silent (English intertitles)

Prisoners of Love is a 1921 American silent drama film produced by and starring Betty Compson and distributed by Goldwyn Pictures. It was directed by Arthur Rosson and was Compson's first film after a year's hiatus from film making.

== Cast ==
- Betty Compson as Blanche Davis
- Ralph Lewis as Her Father
- Claire McDowell as Her Mother
- Emory Johnson as James Randolph
- Kate Toncray as His Mother
- Roy Stewart as Martin Blair

== Preservation ==
Prisoners of Love is currently presumed lost. In February of 2021, the film was cited by the National Film Preservation Board on their Lost U.S. Silent Feature Films list.
