= The Big City (1928 film) =

1928 film

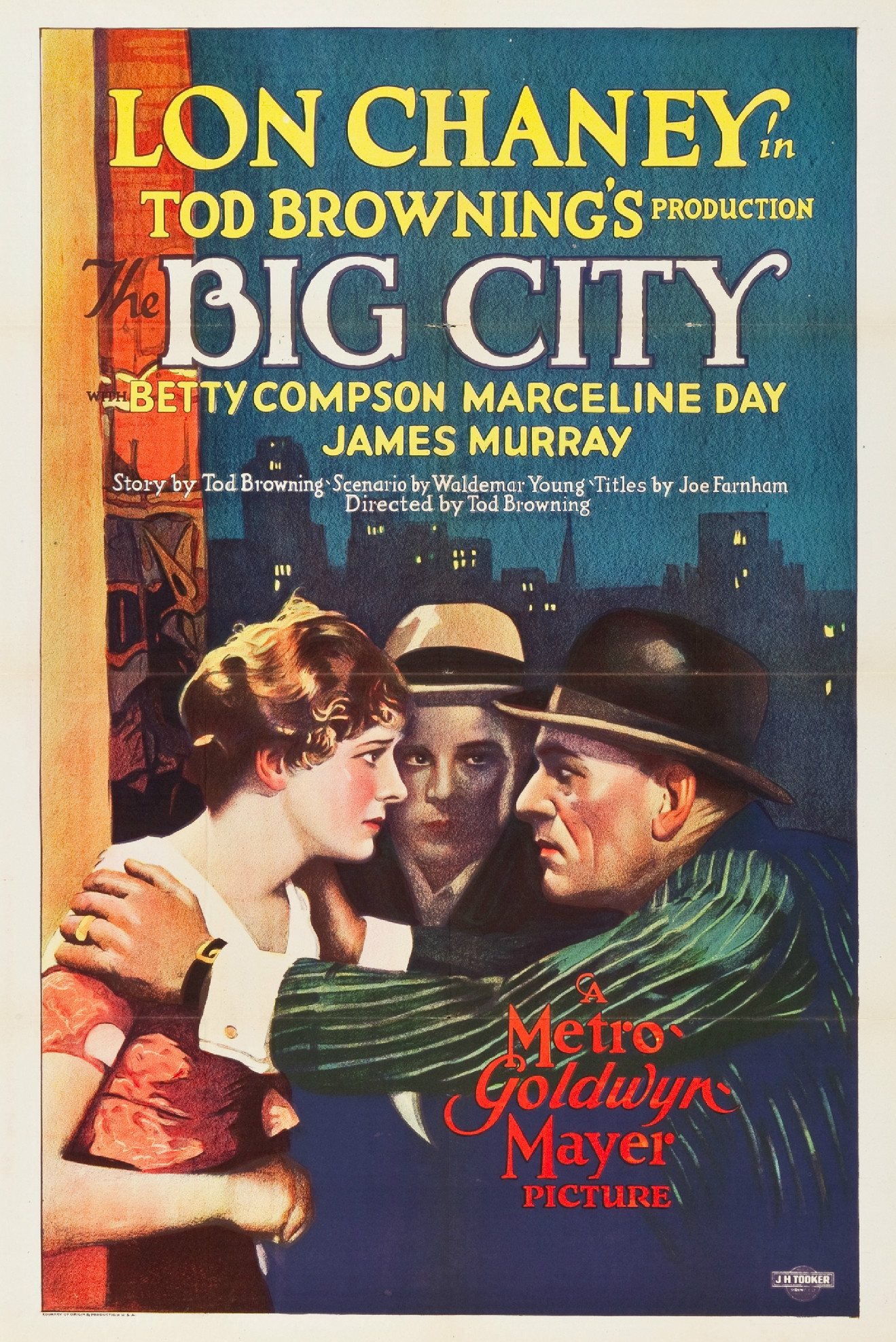
- Theatrical release poster
- Directed by: Tod Browning
- Written by: Waldemar Young (screenplay); Tod Browning (story); Joseph Farnham (titles)
- Produced by: Irving G. Thalberg
- Starring: Lon Chaney; Betty Compson; Matthew Betz; Marceline Day; James Murray; John George
- Cinematography: Henry Sharp
- Edited by: Harry Reynolds
- Distributed by: Metro-Goldwyn-Mayer
- Release date: March 24, 1928
- Running time: 70 minutes (7 reels)
- Country: United States
- Language: Silent with English intertitles

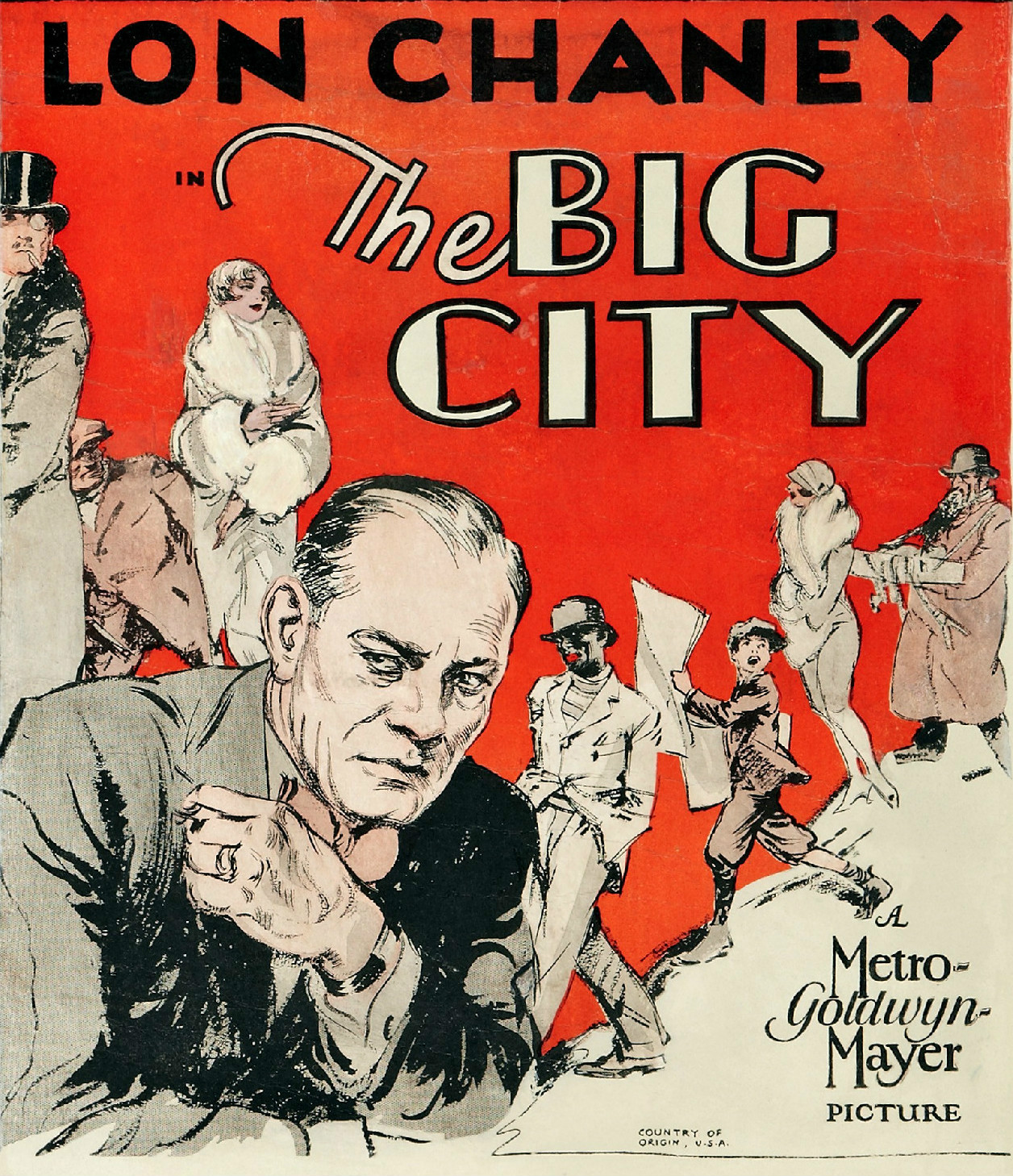
Film poster or trade advert.

The Big City is a 1928 American silent crime film directed by Tod Browning and starring Lon Chaney. Waldemar Young wrote the screenplay, based on a story by Tod Browning.

== Plot ==
Chuck Collins is a gangster who owns the Black Bottom Nightclub, and his girlfriend Helen runs the dress shop that the Collins gang uses as a front. Collins gets word that a rival gangster named Red Watson is planning to rob Collin's patrons of their jewelry, so he decides to beat Red to the punch by stealing the jewels from Red's accomplices after they pull the job.

Collins has Helen hide the loot in her dress shop, where her naive employee "Sunshine" almost exposes the jewels to some investigating policemen in her ignorance. Red is convinced that Collins has the jewels in his possession and goes to the club to force him to turn over the loot to him. The police raid the place, but Chuck and his sidekick Curly escape and hide out in Helen's apartment. While he's staying there under cover, Collins falls in love with Sunshine and starts thinking about going straight and turning the jewels over to the cops.

A jealous Helen tips off Red Watson, who manages to steal back the jewels from Collins. Collins finally winds up stealing back the jewels yet again, and this time he turns them over to the police, hoping that Sunshine will see him now as a good person. But Collins learns that Sunshine and Curly are engaged to be married, so he conceals his disappointment and wishes the happy couple his best. At the end of the film, Collins winds up proposing marriage to Helen, who eagerly accepts his offer.

== Cast ==
- Lon Chaney as Chuck Collins
- Marceline Day as Helen
- Matthew Betz as Red Watson
- Betty Compson as Sunshine
- John George as The Arab
- James Murray as Curly
- Virginia Pearson as Tennessee
- Walter Percival as Grogan
- Lew Short as O'Hara
- Eddie Sturgis as Blinkie
- Nora Cecil as the Landlady (uncredited)
- George H. Reed as Black Waiter (uncredited; as George Reed)
- Alfred Allen as Policeman
- Clinton Lyle as Gangster (uncredited)
- Della Peterson as Dancer (uncredited)
- Betty Westmore as Dancer (uncredited)
- Frank Finch Smiles as Sunshine's father (uncredited)

== Production ==
The film was in production from October 27, 1927, to November 19, 1927, and cost $172,000 to produce.

The sets were designed by Cedric Gibbons. The set for Chuck Collins' nightclub was also used for the nightclub scenes in While the City Sleeps. Clinton Lyle, who plays a gangster in The Big City, was one of Chaney's closest personal friends. This was Betty Compson's only film at MGM though she had appeared in a few Goldwyns, and even produced one, at the beginning of the decade.

The film's tagline was "Lon Chaney gives his most effective performance now as the underworld leader in this throbbing film production. A sputter of bullets in the dark...a battle of crook against crook...and the flowering of a beautiful romance in this amazing setting."

== Release and preservation ==
Trailer for The Big City

The worldwide box office gross was $833,000. Fearing the censors might have a problem with the film's criminal characters, Thalberg requested an extra 90-minute alternate ending be filmed which would have shown that Chuck reformed in the finale, but the footage was never used and no longer exists.

The last known print of the film had been sent to Australia in the late 1950s. The film was returned to MGM and placed in their vaults where it was destroyed in the same vault fire that also claimed London After Midnight and The Tower of Lies in 1965. A short trailer for the film survives at Cinémathèque française in France, but it does not include any actual footage from the film itself. Stills exist showing Chaney in the Chuck Collins role.

However, as of February 2021, The Big City was not included on the National Film Preservation Board's Lost U.S. Silent Feature Films list. The Library of Congress Silent Feature Film Survival Database notes a videotape holding at UCLA Film & Television Archive as of January 2017, though this could be an error.

== Critical comments ==
Critics loved Chaney's tough portrayal of the soft-hearted gangster, and this acclaim probably led to his being cast as a detective in WHILE THE CITY SLEEPS, filmed later that year.

"Not much better than a light-weight underworld picture for a Metro-Goldwyn-Mayer program release, but with the possible novelty of showing Lon Chaney playing a human being in modern dress...Chaney as Chuck Collins, one of the crook leaders, is a consummate actor, in this as well as in character otherwise." ---Variety

"Mr. Chaney has considered carefully what Collins ought to wear. This crook has a penchant for stripes, both in his suits and his neckties. Mr. Chaney's performance is excellent, but, through no fault of his, the latter episodes are hardly convincing." ---The New York Times

"It is even more pleasant, perhaps, to see the gifted Mr. Chaney as the gifted Mr. Chaney and not as a dinosaur, a pygmy or the survivor of several major operations...I seize this opportunity to repeat my former plea [from a review of TELL IT TO THE MARINES] to Mr. Chaney to leave the trick makeup, henceforth, to those lesser actors who need something of the sort to get them by. Mr. Chaney quite emphatically does not." ---Exhibitors Herald

"Lon Chaney's personality makes the picture look better than it is." ----Film Daily

"The Chaney-Browning team has made an altogether showmanly job of this melodrama adventure in photoplay." ---Motion Picture News

"Lon Chaney is a crook of no mean ability in this story....Lon wears his God-given face in this picture. The story is complicated but has good action."---Photoplay

"Intelligent people will laugh at it; picture-goers of the rank and file may get some enjoyment out of it...At least it is not of the gruesome sort, as the last three or four Chaney pictures have been. It is a crook melodrama in which suspense is supposed to predominate. Mr. Chaney is made to look ridiculous however by being made to reform...." ---Harrison's Reports

== See also ==
- List of lost films
- Dressed to Kill (1928) w/Mary Astor
