= The White Shadow (film) =

1923 film

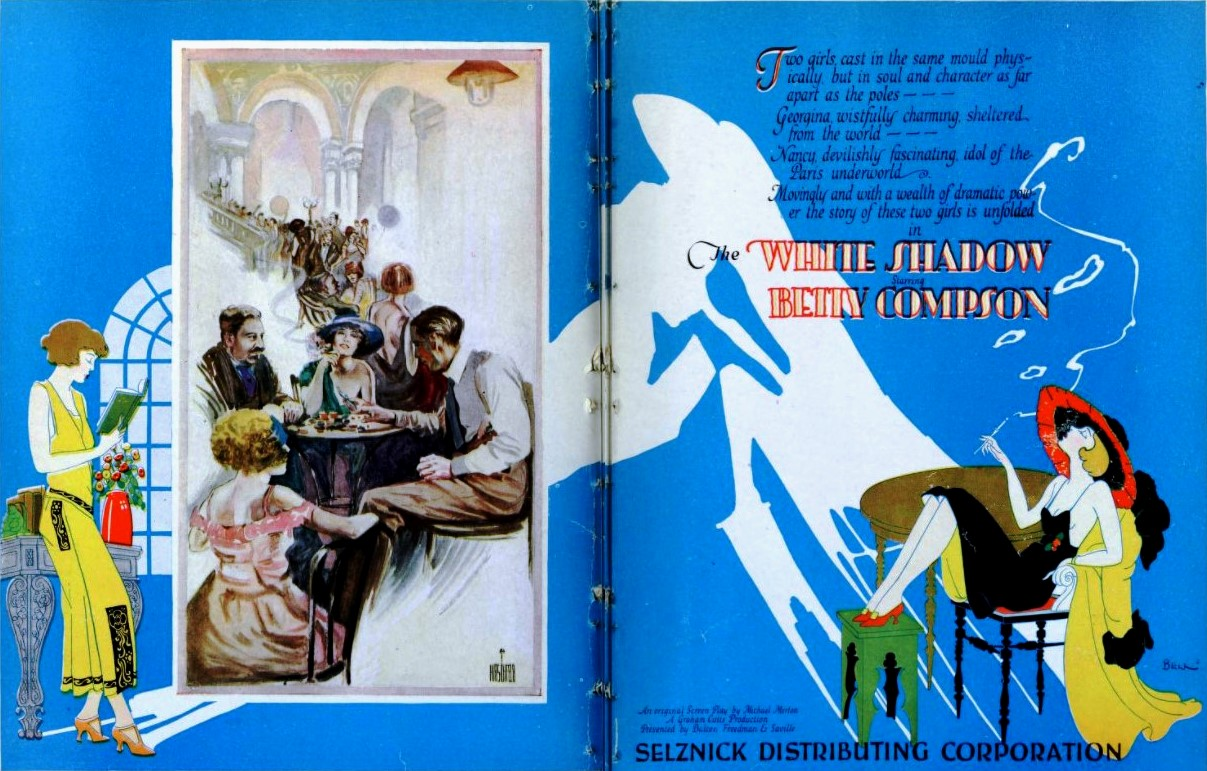
- 1924 American advertisement
- Directed by: Graham Cutts; Alfred Hitchcock (uncredited)
- Written by: Graham Cutts; Alfred Hitchcock (uncredited); Michael Morton (novel Children of Chance)
- Produced by: Michael Balcon; Victor Saville
- Starring: Betty Compson; Clive Brook; Henry Victor; A. B. Imeson
- Cinematography: Claude L. McDonnell
- Production companies: Balcon, Freedman and Saville
- Distributed by: Woolf & Freedman Film Service (UK); Lewis J. Selznick Enterprises (USA)
- Release dates: August 1923 (UK); 13 October 1924 (US)
- Running time: 82 minutes
- Country: United Kingdom
- Language: Silent (English intertitles)

The White Shadow, also known as White Shadows in the United States, is a 1923 British silent drama film directed by Graham Cutts and starring Betty Compson, Clive Brook, and Henry Victor.

== Plot ==
The surviving footage from The White Shadow

Twin sisters, one who is modest and socially conservative, the other a free spirit cannot bear the constrictions of a traditional life. Their father's unhappiness over his bohemian daughter's lifestyle leads him to drink and dissolution. The sisters end up having the same man, Robin, in love with them, without him realizing they are two different people. The extant film ends at a most critical juncture, at which both sisters, Robin, and the father meet at a Paris boîte and are about to realize who each other is. There are several multiple exposures when the two sisters, both played by Betty Compson, are on screen at once.

== Cast ==
- Betty Compson as Nancy Brent / Georgina Brent
- Clive Brook as Robin Field
- Henry Victor as Louis Chadwick
- A. B. Imeson as Mr. Brent
- Olaf Hytten as Herbert Barnes
- Daisy Campbell as Elizabeth Brent

== Production ==
The film is based on the unpublished novel Children of Chance by Michael Morton. Alfred Hitchcock collaborated with Cutts on the film. Cutts and Hitchcock made the film quickly, as they wanted to make use of Betty Compson, who had appeared in their hit Woman to Woman (also 1923), before she returned to the United States.

The film was made at the Balcon, Freedman and Saville studio in Hoxton, London.

Writing about the film in 1969, producer Michael Balcon said:

"Engrossed in our first production [Woman to Woman], we had made no preparations for the second. Caught on the hop, we rushed into production with a story called The White Shadow. It was as big a flop as Woman to Woman had been a success."

== Preservation status ==
Long thought to have been a completely lost film, a New Zealand projectionist, Jack Murtagh, had salvaged some of the film. In 1989, Tony Osborne, Murtagh's grandson, donated the tinted nitrate prints, and other film cans to the New Zealand Film Archive.

On 3 August 2011, the New Zealand Film Archive announced that the film "turned up among a cache of unidentified American nitrate prints held in the archive for the last 23 years". One film can was mislabeled Two Sisters, while the other simply stated Unidentified American Film. Only later were they identified.

In 2012, The White Shadow was preserved by Park Road Post Production, Wellington, New Zealand, with support from the New Zealand Film Archive and the Academy of Motion Picture Arts and Sciences.

In 2013, it was released on a 198-minute DVD by the National Film Preservation Foundation, with six other films and seven shorts.

== Notes ==
- Rachael Low: The History of British Film: Volume IV, 1918–1929 (Routledge, 1997)

== Further viewing ==
- "White shadow (1924)". Lost and Found: American Treasures from the New Zealand Film Archive. San Francisco: National Film Preservation Foundation. 2013. OCLC 937863948 OCLC 915421358
