= The Ladybird (film) =

1927 film

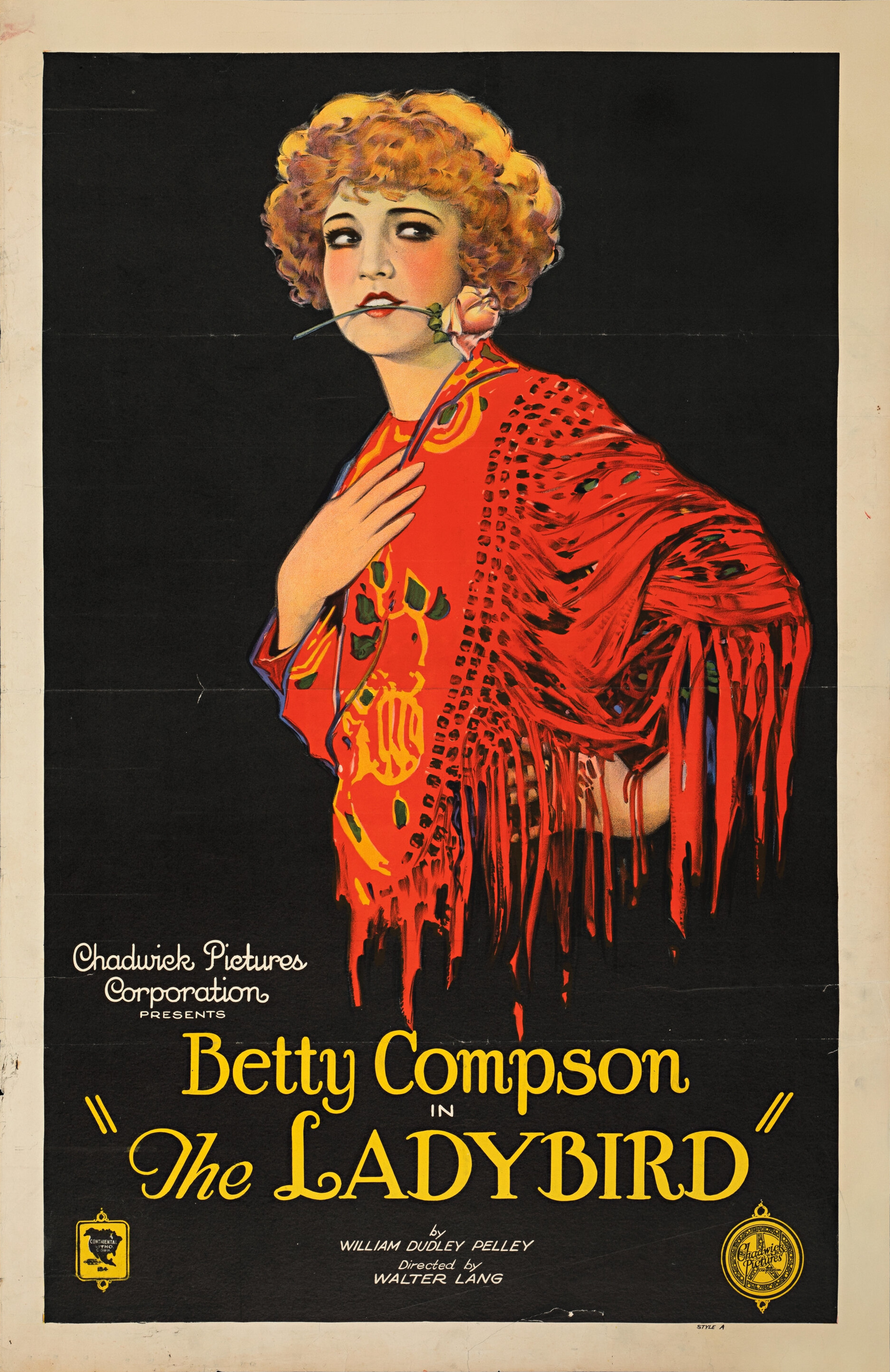
- Directed by: Walter Lang
- Written by: Jack Natteford; William Dudley Pelley
- Starring: Betty Compson
- Cinematography: Ernest Miller; Ted Tetzlaff
- Distributed by: Chadwick Pictures
- Release date: July 15, 1927; per afi
- Running time: 71 minutes
- Country: United States
- Language: Silent (English intertitles)

The Ladybird is a 1927 American silent crime film directed by Walter Lang and starring Betty Compson. It was produced by the B movie studio Chadwick Pictures.

== Plot ==
The film follows the activities of a gang called 'The Ladybirds' -- criminals who prey upon the rich and famous of New Orleans.

During Mardi Gras, a society girl called Diane Wyman gets a job dancing at a local cabaret and unwittingly becomes entangled with the Ladybirds plots.

== Cast ==
- Betty Compson as Diane Wyman
- Malcolm McGregor as Duncan Spencer
- Sheldon Lewis as Spider
- Hank Mann as The Brother
- Leo White as Phillipe
- John Miljan as Jules Ranier
- Ruth Stonehouse as Lucille
- Jean De Briac as Jacques
- Joseph W. Girard as Jacob Gale (as Joseph Gerard)

== Preservation ==
Complete 35mm nitrate and acetate prints of The Ladybird are held by the Library of Congress.

== See also ==
- List of American films of 1927
