= The Woman with Four Faces =

1923 film

The Woman With Four Faces
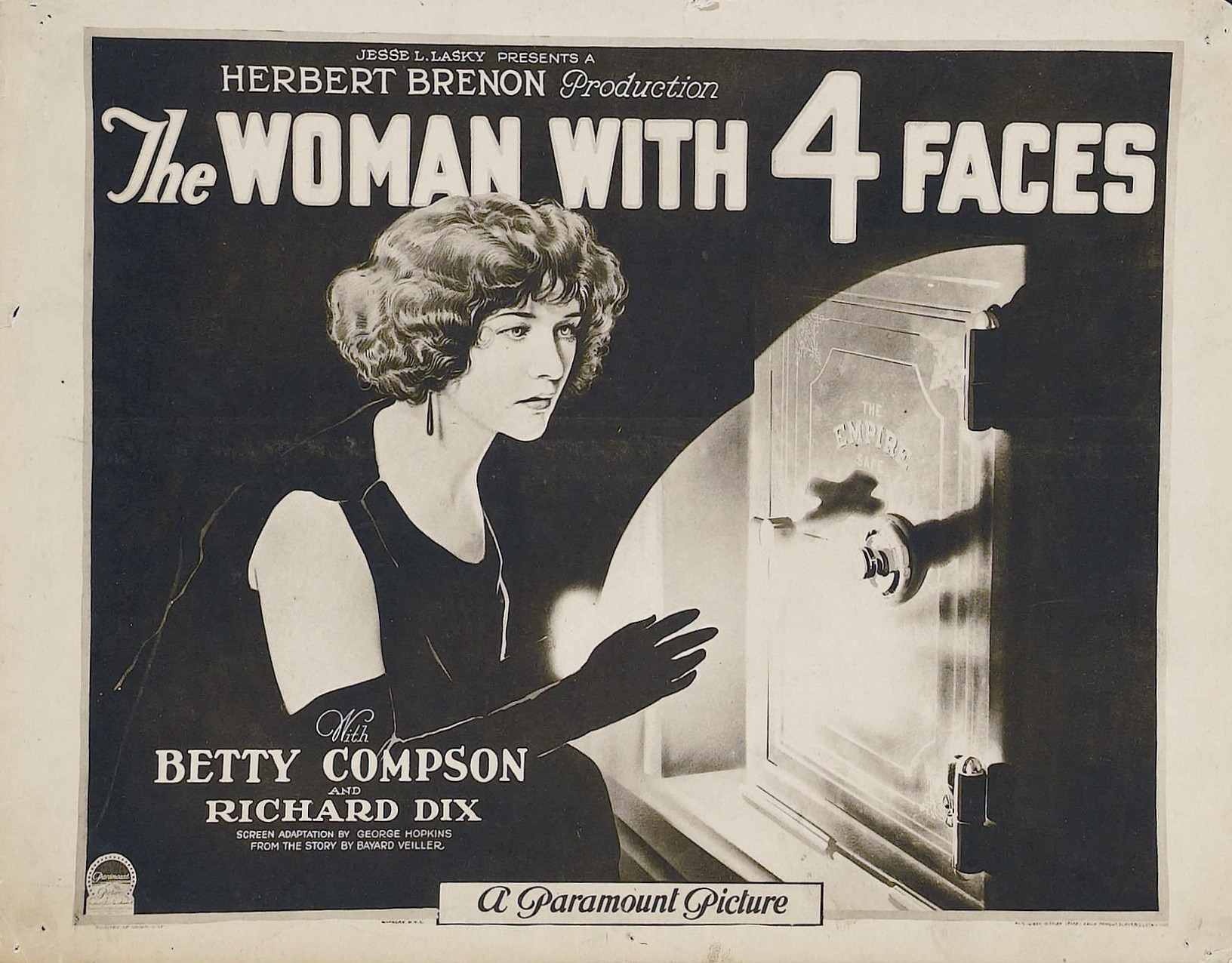
- Lobby card
- Directed by: Herbert Brenon
- Written by: George James Hopkins (adaptation)
- Based on: The Woman With Four Faces by Bayard Veiller
- Produced by: Adolph Zukor; Jesse Lasky
- Starring: Betty Compson; Richard Dix
- Cinematography: James Wong Howe (as Jimmie Howe)
- Distributed by: Paramount Pictures
- Release date: June 24, 1923
- Running time: 60 minutes; 6 reels
- Country: United States
- Language: Silent (English intertitles)

The Woman With Four Faces is a 1923 American silent crime melodrama film directed by Herbert Brenon and starring Betty Compson. Famous Players–Lasky produced while Paramount Pictures released. The story is based on a play (possibly unproduced), The Woman With Four Faces, by Bayard Veiller. Part of the film was shot on location in San Quentin Prison.

== Plot ==
As described in a film magazine review, Elizabeth West, a young woman who is both a thief and a con artist and allied with a gang of crooks, is freed when a jury does not convict her on a larceny charge. She determines to aid district attorney Richard Templar to round up a gang of narcotic traffickers. Disguised as an old woman, she secures the privilege of having an old confederate, who is in solitary confinement, temporarily released to aid in the plan. He turns against her, however, and she is forced to work alone with the district attorney. They succeed in their plan and then confess their love for each other.

== Cast ==
- Betty Compson as Elizabeth West
- Richard Dix as Richard Templar
- George Fawcett as Judge Westcott
- Theodore von Eltz as Jim Hartigan
- Joseph Kilgour as Judson Osgood
- Jim Farley as Morton (credited as James Farley)
- Guy Oliver as Warden Cassidy
- Charles A. Stevenson as Ralph Dobson
- Gladden James as The Boy
- Eulalie Jensen as The Mother

== Preservation ==
The Woman with Four Faces is currently presumed lost. In February of 2021, the film was cited by the National Film Preservation Board on their Lost U.S. Silent Feature Films list.

== See also ==
- List of lost films
