= Betty Compson =

American actress (1897–1974)

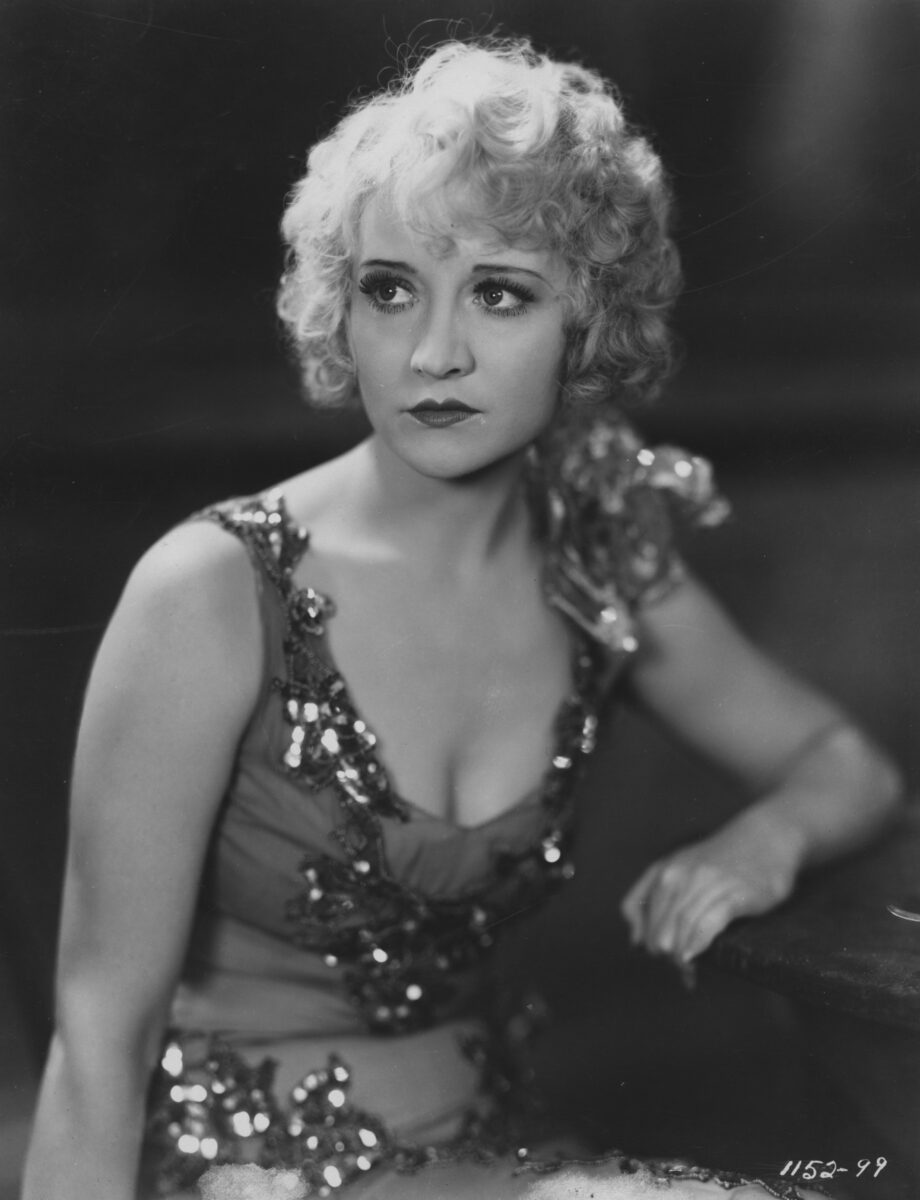
- Publicity photo, 1927
- Born: Eleanor Luicime Compson; March 19, 1897; Beaver, Utah, U.S.
- Died: April 18, 1974 (aged 77); Glendale, California, U.S.
- Resting place: San Fernando Mission Cemetery
- Occupation: Actress
- Years active: 1915–1948
- Spouses: James Cruze (m. 1924; div. 1930) Irving Weinberg (m. 1933; div. 1937) Silvius Jack Gall (m. 1944; died 1962)

Betty Compson (born Eleanor Luicime Compson; March 19, 1897 – April 18, 1974) was an American actress and film producer who got her start during Hollywood's silent era. She is best known for her performances in The Docks of New York and The Barker, the latter of which earned her an Academy Award nomination for Best Actress.

== Early life ==
Compson was born on March 19, 1897, the daughter of Virgil and Mary (née Rauscher) Compson, in Beaver, Utah, at a mining camp. Her father was a mining engineer, gold prospector, and grocery-store proprietor, and her mother was a maid in homes and a hotel.

Compson graduated from Salt Lake High School. Her father died when she was young, and she obtained employment as a violinist at 16 at a theater in Salt Lake City.

== Career ==
Playing in vaudeville sketches with touring circuits, Compson was noticed by Hollywood producers. While touring, she was discovered by comedic producer Al Christie and signed a contract with him. Her first silent film, Wanted, a Leading Lady, was in November 1915.

She made 25 films in 1916 alone, although all of them were shorts for Christie with the exception of one feature, Almost a Widow. She continued this pace of making numerous short films well into the middle of 1918 when after a long apprenticeship with Christie, she started making features exclusively. Compson's star began to rise with the release of the 1919 feature The Miracle Man (1919) for George Loane Tucker. Paramount signed Compson to a five-year contract with the help of Tucker.

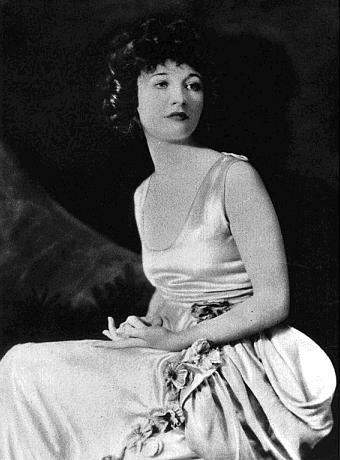
Compson in Photoplay (July 1920)

Her popularity allowed her to establish her own production company, which provided her creative control over screenplays and financing. Her first movie as producer was Prisoners of Love (1921). She played the role of Blanche Davis, a girl born to wealth and cursed by her inheritance of physical beauty. Compson selected Art Rosson to direct the feature. The story was chosen from a work by actress and writer Catherine Henry.

After completing The Woman With Four Faces (1923), Paramount refused to offer her a raise (her salary was $2,500 per week), and she refused to sign without one. Instead, she signed with a motion picture company in London. There she starred in a series of four films directed by Graham Cutts, a well-known English filmmaker.

The first of these was a movie version of an English play called Woman to Woman (1923), the screenplay for which was co-written by Cutts and Alfred Hitchcock. Part of The White Shadow (in which she played a dual role), another Cutts/Hitchcock collaboration. Woman to Woman proved to be popular enough for Jesse Lasky to offer top dollar to return to Paramount.

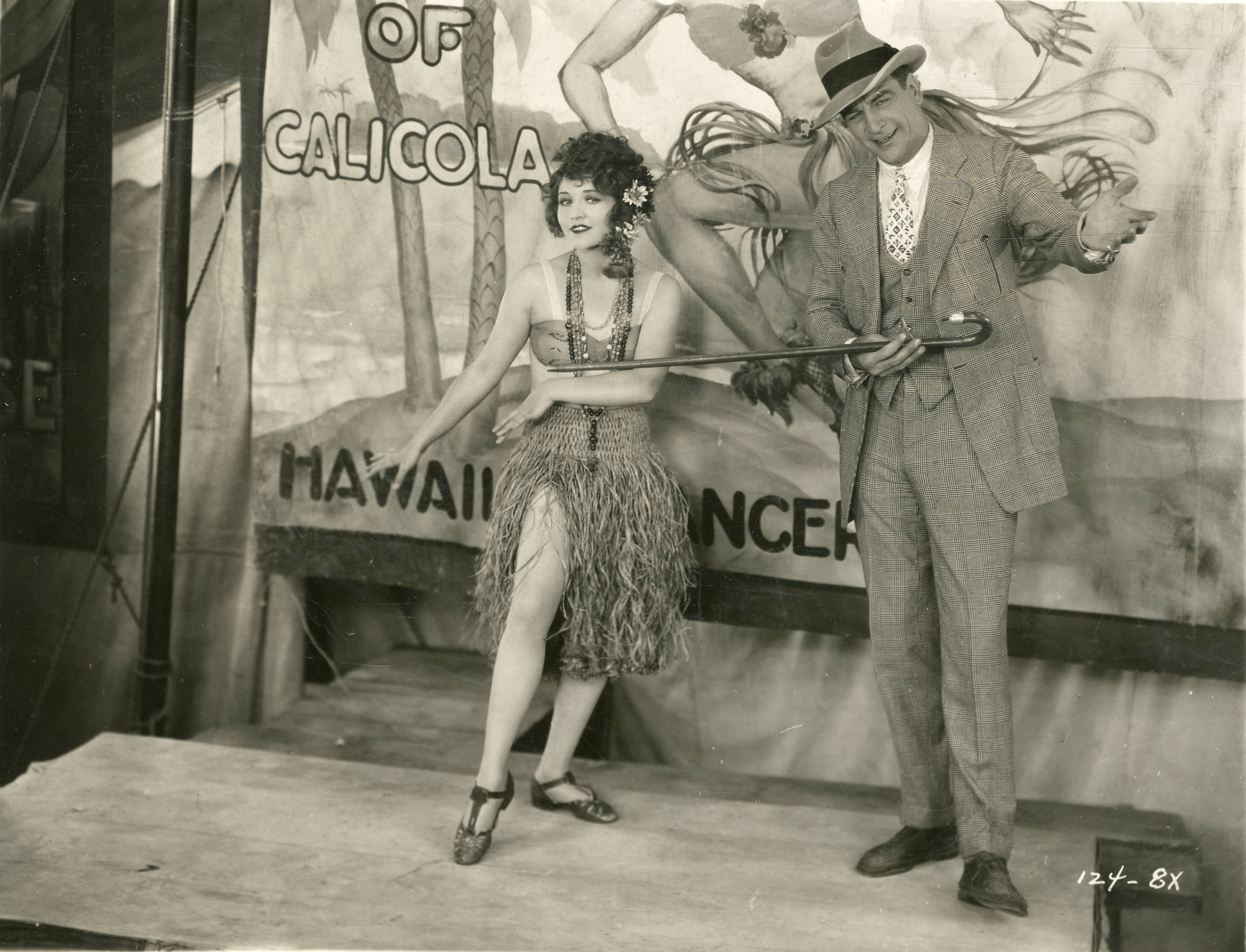
Betty Compson and Milton Sills in The Barker (1928)

Back in Hollywood, she starred in The Enemy Sex, directed by James Cruze, as well as the sound film The Great Gabbo in 1929, with Eric von Stroheim--his first sound picture. Compson and Cruze were married in 1925; they divorced in 1929. Her contract with Paramount was not renewed, and she decided to freelance, working with lower-budget studios such as Columbia in The Belle of Broadway and Chadwick in The Ladybird. During this time, she was suggested as a replacement for difficult Greta Garbo in the MGM feature Flesh and the Devil opposite John Gilbert. She eventually worked for the studio with former The Miracle Man co-star Lon Chaney in The Big City.

In 1928, she appeared in a First National Pictures part-talkie, The Barker. Her performance as manipulative carnival girl Carrie garnered her a nomination for the Academy Award for Best Actress, although she lost to Mary Pickford in Coquette. In Court-Martial, a 1928 silent film, she became the first actress to portray Old West outlaw Belle Starr on film. In the same year, she appeared in the acclaimed Josef von Sternberg film The Docks of New York in a sympathetic portrayal of a suicidal prostitute.

These films caused Compson's popularity to re-emerge, and she became a busy actress in the new talking cinema. In fact, Chaney offered her the female lead in his first talkie The Unholy Three, but she was too busy and instead suggested friend Lila Lee. Unlike a number of other female stars of silent film, it was felt that her voice recorded exceptionally well. Although she was not a singer, she appeared in a number of early musicals in which her singing voice was dubbed.

=== Later career ===
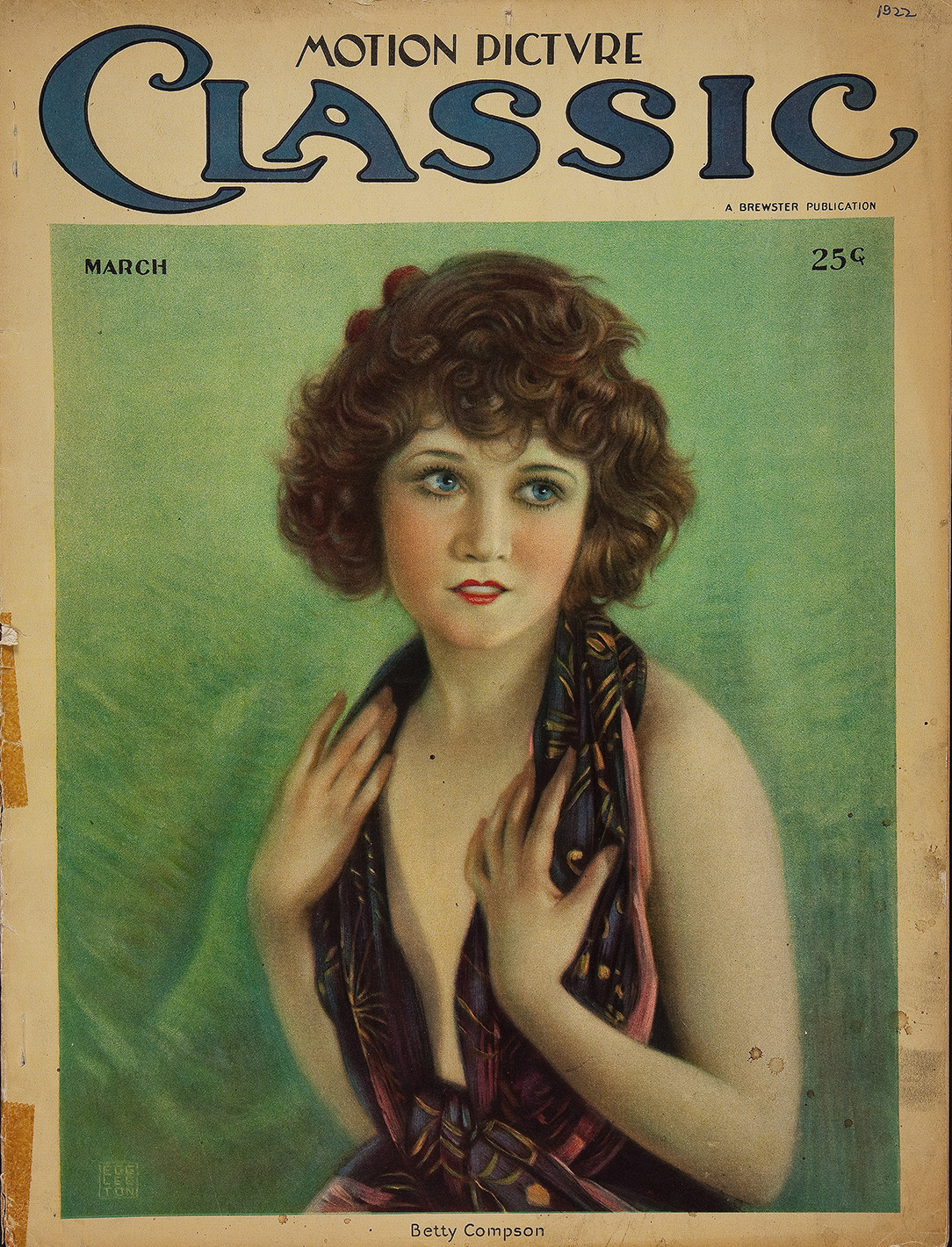
Betty Compson on the cover of the 1922 March Motion Picture Classic magazine. Cover artist, Benjamin Eggleston (1867-1937).

Now divorced from Cruze, Compson's career continued to flourish, starring in nine films in 1930 alone. However, her last hit proved to be in The Spoilers, alongside Gary Cooper.

At a time when silent-era stars with faltering careers chose to retire from the screen rather than face defeat, Betty Compson kept working. She was content to play character parts in major-studio films, as well as leads in lower-budgeted, independent productions. One major film that might have scored a decisive comeback was Gone with the Wind (1939); she shot a Technicolor screen test for the role of Belle Watling, but lost the role to Ona Munson. Compson played a small role in an Alfred Hitchcock film, Mr. & Mrs. Smith.

That same year Compson took the lead in her least prestigious credit, Escort Girl, a very-low-budget exploitation film about sordid partners (Compson and fellow silent-screen veteran Wheeler Oakman) operating a shady escort agency. She played the role in grand, soap-opera-queen manner, and may have accepted the role for some fast cash, reasoning that mainstream audiences would never see the picture. Only one trade paper deigned to review it: The Exhibitor rated it a "sexer for houses which can play this type of show. This one is plenty lurid. However, all the cast work hard and earnestly in their roles." As it happened, Escort Girl actually helped both Compson and Oakman by letting the film community know they were still active, and extending their careers into the late 1940s.

She became a familiar face at Monogram Pictures, where she worked with Bela Lugosi, Jean Parker, Grace Hayes, and The Bowery Boys. Compson's last film was the 1948 Hal Roach comedy Here Comes Trouble, filmed in Cinecolor. After retiring from the screen, she began a cosmetic line and helped her husband run a business called Ashtrays Unlimited.

== Personal life ==
After her marriage with Cruze ended, Compson married two more times. Her marriage to agent/producer Irving Weinberg ended in divorce, and her marriage to Silvius Gall ended with Gall's death in 1962. She had no children.

== Death ==
Compson died April 18, 1974, of a heart attack at her home in Glendale, California, aged 77. She was interred in San Fernando Mission Cemetery in San Fernando, California. For her contributions to the motion picture industry, Compson has a star on the Hollywood Walk of Fame at 1751 Vine Street.

== Filmography ==
For main film selections see Betty Compson filmography.

== See also ==
- List of actors with Academy Award nominations

== Sources ==
- Los Angeles Times, Betty Compson Has Film Unit, February 15, 1920, Page III1.
- Los Angeles Times, Betty Compson Star, January 2, 1921, Page III20.
- Los Angeles Times, Flashes; Star To Travel Betty Compson Signs For London Films, April 5, 1923, Page II7.
- Los Angeles Times, Ex-Film Star Betty Compson, April 23, 1974, Page A4.
- Ogden, Utah Standard-Examiner, Closeup and Comedy, Monday Evening, May 25, 1934, Page 7.
