= The Lone Hand =

The Lone Hand may refer to:

- The Lone Hand (1919 film), a 1919 film, directed by George Holt and starring Hoot Gibson
- The Lone Hand (1920 film), a 1920 film, directed by Clifford Smith and starring Roy Stewart
- The Lone Hand (1922 film), a 1922 film, directed by B. Reeves Eason and starring Hoot Gibson
- The Lone Hand (1953 film), aka Lone Hand, a 1953 film directed by George Sherman and starring Joel McCrea
- The Lone Hand (magazine), (1907–1921) a popular Australian magazine

== See also ==
- Lone Hand Wilson, a 1920 Western silent film
- Lone Hand Saunders, a 1926 American silent western film
- The Lone Hand Texan, a 1947 American Western musical film
