= Fritzi Ridgeway =

American actress (1898–1961)

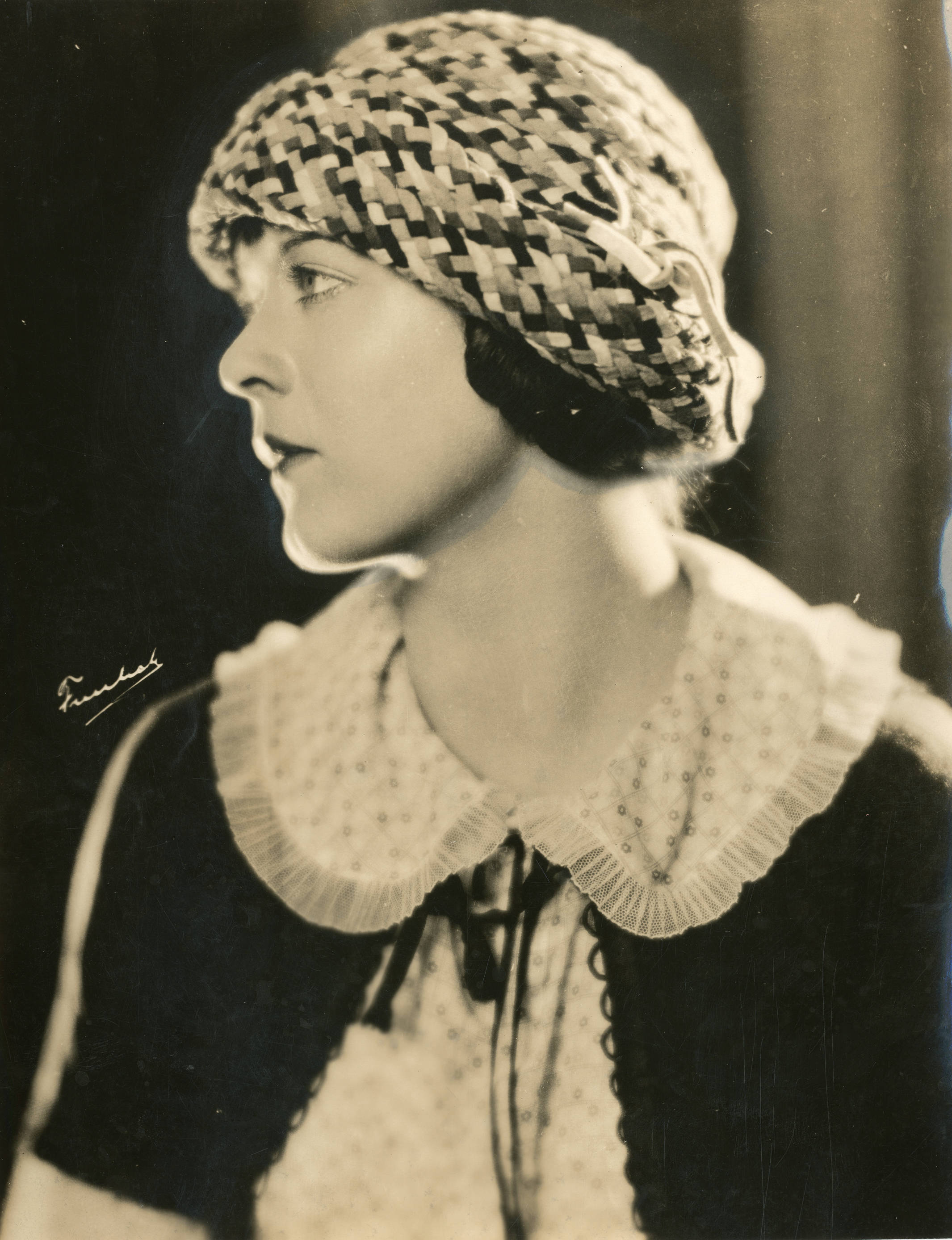
- Ridgeway in 1924
- Born: Fredricka Berneice Hawkes; April 8, 1898; Missoula, Montana, U.S.
- Died: March 29, 1961 (aged 62); Lancaster, California, U.S.
- Occupations: Actress; hotelier
- Years active: 1916–1934
- Spouses: Constantin Bakaleinikoff (m. 1925): Walter D. Simm

Fritzi Ridgeway (April 8, 1898 – March 29, 1961), sometimes credited as Fritzie Ridgeway, was an American silent film actress, vaudeville performer, and hotelier. Although she starred in numerous films, she is perhaps best known for her work in silent Western films.

Born Fredricka Berneice Hawkes, a native of Montana, Ridgeway worked as both a vaudeville performer and a professional trick rider before making her film debut in 1916. She appeared in 63 films between 1916 and 1934, with prominent roles in Western films populating much of her early career. Other notable roles include supporting parts in Tod Browning's drama The Unpainted Woman (1919) and The Enemy (1927).

Ridgeway officially retired from acting in 1934, making her final screen appearance in Rouben Mamoulian's We Live Again. She spent the latter half of her life managing the Hotel del Tahquitz in Palm Springs, California, a hotel she built in 1928. She remained the proprietor of the Hotel del Tahquitz until her death in 1961. She was married to Russian composer Constantin Bakaleinikoff. In L.A. Exposed: Strange Myths and Curious Legends in the City of Angels, historian Paul Young noted Ridgeway as an "iconoclastic silent film star".

== Early life ==
Ridgeway was born Fredricka Berneice Hawkes on April 8, 1898 in Missoula, Montana, later moving with her family to Butte, where she attended primary school. Prior to establishing herself as a film actress, Ridgeway worked as both a vaudeville performer and as a trick rider. As a teenager, Ridgeway traveled with her family between Montana and California, and attended Hollywood High School in Los Angeles. She was also educated in Chicago.

== Career ==
=== Early films ===
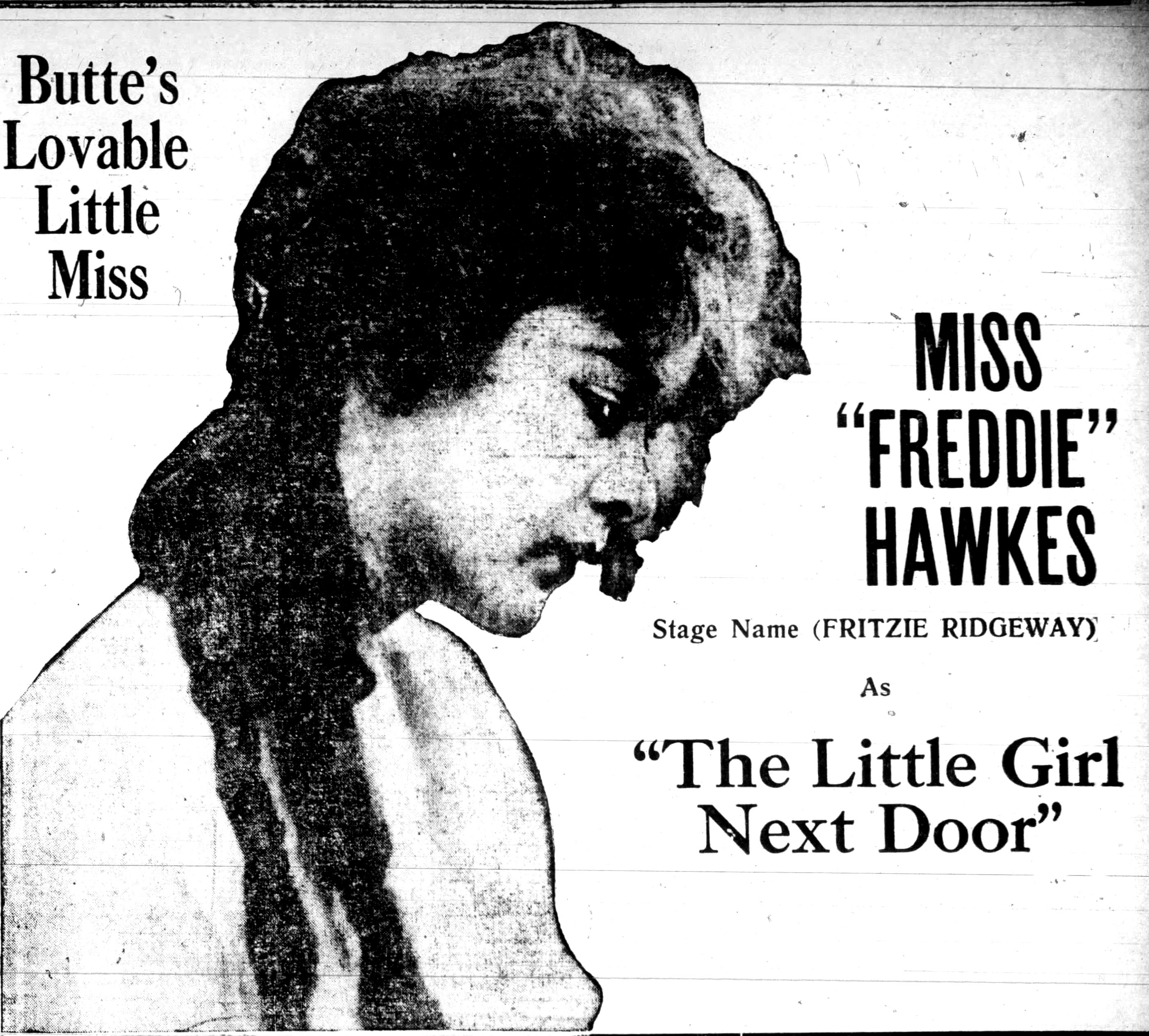
1916 ad for the feature film "The Little Girl Next Door"

She made her film debut in the short The Bridesmaid's Secret (1916), and appeared later that year in the title role of the feature film The Little Girl Next Door. The following year brought her first feature film role in a Western, The Hero of the Hour (1917). Ridgeway would appear in several silent Western shorts after, including The Wrong Man (1917) and The Soul Herder (1917). Her appearances in Westerns earned her the name of the "cowgirl star" early in her career. She appeared as Evelyn Hastings in the 1917 picture The Learnin' of Jim Benton opposite Roy Stewart, and was noted in a review for her "delightful" performance in the film.

In 1919, Ridgeway appeared in Victor Schertzinger's comedy When Doctors Disagree, followed by a supporting part in Tod Browning's drama The Unpainted Woman (1919) for Universal Pictures. She would continue to play in silent pictures into the late 1920s, including roles in the drama The Old Homestead (1922), the Western Ruggles of Red Gap (1923), and the drama The Enemy (1927), opposite Lillian Gish.

=== Later work and retirement ===
In 1932, she appeared in the pre-Code film Ladies of the Big House, starring Sylvia Sidney and Gene Raymond, which received positive critical acclaim with a review in The New York Times that noted that the movie "manages to convey this terror with a fair measure of success". In 1934, she appeared in a supporting part in the horror film House of Mystery (1934) opposite Verna Hillie and John Sheehan. Ridgeway made her final screen appearance in a minor uncredited role in We Live Again (1934), an adaptation of Leo Tolstoy's Resurrection, before retiring from acting.

Ridgeway spent her remaining years managing the Hotel del Tahquitz, a 100-room hotel which she had built in Palm Springs, California in 1928.

== Personal life ==
On November 23, 1916, Ridgeway married John Charles Webb Dill of Hollywood. Ridgeway married Russian composer Constantin Bakaleinikoff in Cincinnati, Ohio on December 23, 1925. In March 1928, Ridgeway commissioned architect Anthony Miller to design a home for her, which was built in Los Angeles, California. She would later marry Walter D. Simm, with whom she remained married until her death of a heart attack in 1961, aged 62.

== Filmography ==
Year	Title	Role	Notes
1916	The Bridesmaid's Secret	Hazel Field	Short film
1916	The Little Girl Next Door	title role	Short film
1917	Where Glory Waits	Scylla	Short film
1917	The Hero of the Hour	Mildred Nebeker	
1917	A Blissful Calamity	Annie Smith	Short film; as Fritzie Ridgeway
1917	The Wrong Man	Anice Malone	Short film
1917	High Speed	Susan	
1917	The Soul Herder	Jane	Short film
1917	The Calendar Girl	Mazie	As Fritzie Ridgeway
1917	Up or Down?	Esther Hollister	
1917	The Learnin' of Jim Benton	Evelyn Hastings	
1918	The Law's Outlaw	Rose Davison	
1918	Real Folks	Joyce Clifton	
1918	Faith Endurin'	Helen Dryer	
1918	The Danger Zone	Marie Fitzmaurice	As Fritzie Ridgeway
1918	The Fire Flingers	Ellen	As Fritzie Ridgeway
1919	When Doctors Disagree	Violet Henny	
1919	The Unpainted Woman	Edna	As Fritzie Ridgeway
1919	The Petal on the Current	Cora Kinealy	As Fritzie Ridgeway
1919	Winning a Bride	Mary Pendleton	
1920	Judy of Rogue's Harbor	Olive Ketchel	
1921	Bring Him In	Mary Mackay	
1921	The Fatal 30		
1922	The Hate Trail	Mary Munger	
1922	Boomerang Justice	Ruth Randolph	
1922	The Old Homestead	Ann	
1923	Trifling with Honor	Ida Hunt	
1923	The Cricket on the Heart	Bertha Plummer	
1923	Ruggles of Red Gap	Emily Judson	
1927	Nobody's Widow	Mademoiselle Renée	
1927	Man Bait	Gloria	
1927	Getting Gertie's Garter	Barbara Felton	
1927	Girl in the Rain		
1927	Lonesome Ladies	Dorothy	
1927	Face Value	Muriel Stanley	
1927	The Enemy	Mitzi Winkelmann	
1928	Flying Romeos	Minnie	
1928	Son of the Golden West	Rita	
1928	Red Hot Speed	Slavey	
1929	This Is Heaven	Mamie Chase	
1930	Hell's Heroes	Mother	
1930	Prince of Diamonds	Lolah	
1931	The Mad Parade	Prudence Graham	
1931	Ladies of the Big House	Reno Maggie	
1932	Frisco Jenny	Miss Jessie	Uncredited
1934	House of Mystery	Stella Walker	
1934	Little Man, What Now?	Party Guest	Uncredited
1934	No Ransom	Miss Price	
1934	We Live Again	Redhead	Uncredited

== Works cited ==
- Jacobs, Diane (1994). Christmas in July: The Life and Art of Preston Sturges (reprint ed.). University of California Press. ISBN 978-0-520-08928-0.
- Klepper, Robert K. (2005). Silent Films, 1877–1996: A Critical Guide to 646 Movies (updated ed.). McFarland. ISBN 978-0-786-42164-0.
- Langman, Larry (2009). The Media in the Movies: A Catalog of American Journalism Films, 1900–1996. McFarland. ISBN 978-0-786-44091-7.
- Lech, Steve (2005). Resorts of Riverside County. Charleston, SC: Arcadia. ISBN 978-0-73853-0-789. OCLC 62790503.
- Mallory, Mary (2011). Hollywoodland. Images of America. Arcadia Publishing. ISBN 978-0-738-57478-3.
- Rainey, Buck (1992). Sweethearts of the Sage: Biographies and Filmographies of 258 Actresses Appearing in Western Movies. McFarland. ISBN 978-0-899-50565-7.
- Sanchez, Nellie Van de Grift (1930). Hunt, Rockwell Dennis (ed.). California and Californians. Vol. 4. Lews Publishing Company.
- Senn, Bryan (1996). Golden Horrors: An Illustrated Critical Filmography of Terror Cinema, 1931–1939. McFarland. ISBN 978-0-786-40175-8.
- Vazzana, Eugene Michael (2001). Silent Film Necrology. McFarland. ISBN 978-0-786-41059-0.
- Wild, Peter (2011). Heiress of Doom: Lois Kellogg of Palm Springs. Tucson, AZ: Estate of Peter Wild. OCLC 748583736.
- Young, Paul (2002). L.A. Exposed: Strange Myths and Curious Legends in the City of Angels. St. Martin's Griffin. ISBN 978-0-312-20646-8.
