= The Boss of the Lazy Y =

1917 film

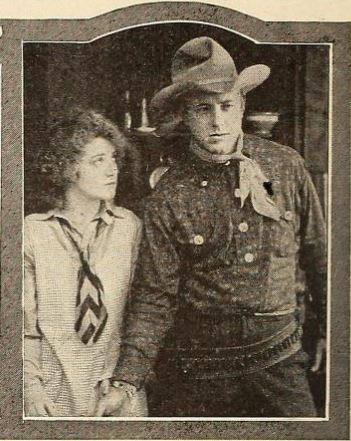
- Directed by: Clifford Smith
- Written by: Charles Alden Seltzer (novel); Alan James
- Starring: Roy Stewart; Josie Sedgwick; Frank MacQuarrie
- Cinematography: Stephen Rounds
- Production companies: Fine Arts Film Company; Triangle Film Corporation
- Distributed by: Triangle Distributing
- Release date: April 7, 1917
- Running time: 50 minutes
- Country: United States
- Languages: Silent; English intertitles

The Boss of the Lazy Y is a 1917 American silent Western film directed by Clifford Smith and starring Roy Stewart, Josie Sedgwick and Frank MacQuarrie.

== Cast ==
- Roy Stewart as Calumet Marston
- Josie Sedgwick as Betty Clayton
- Frank MacQuarrie as Tom Taggart
- Graham Pettie as Jim Marston
- Walt Whitman as Malcolm Clayton
- Aaron Edwards as Neal Taggart
- Frankie Lee as Bob Clayton
- William Ellingford as Dane Toban
- Bill Patton as Dade

== Preservation ==
With no holdings located in archives, The Boss of the Lazy Y is considered a lost film.

== Bibliography ==
- Rainey, Buck. Sweethearts of the Sage: Biographies and Filmographies of 258 actresses appearing in Western movies. McFarland & Company, 1992.
