= Daredevil Jack =

1920 film

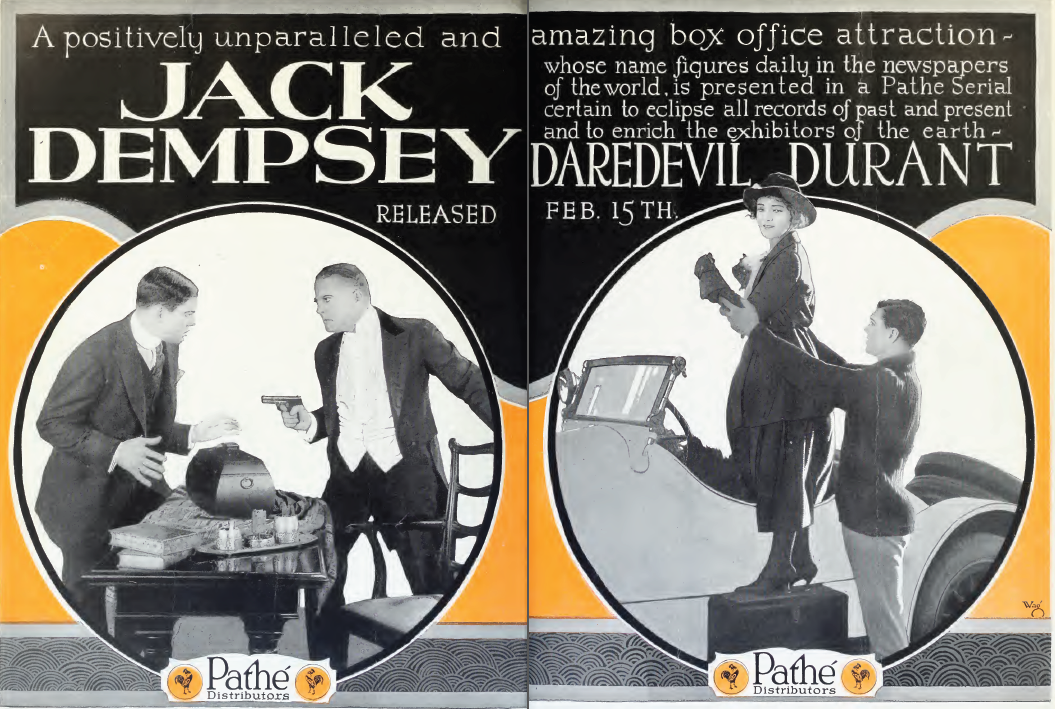
- Ad for film serial
- Directed by: W. S. Van Dyke
- Written by: Jack Cunningham; Frederick Chapin; Harry O. Hoyt
- Produced by: Robert Brunton
- Starring: Jack Dempsey; Josie Sedgwick; Lon Chaney
- Distributed by: Pathé Exchange; Astra Films
- Release date: February 2, 1920
- Running time: 15 episodes
- Country: United States
- Language: Silent (English intertitles)

Daredevil Jack is a 1920 American silent 15-chapter action film serial directed by W. S. Van Dyke and starring heavyweight champion Jack Dempsey and featuring Lon Chaney as a villain. The chapters were shown weekly between February and May 1920. The serial's working titles were Daredevil Durant or Dead or Alive. An incomplete copy of the film is housed in the UCLA Film & Television Archive.

The supporting cast features Lon Chaney, Edgar Kennedy, John George and Bull Montana. This was the first of 23 films, many of them short subjects, in which the iconic boxer Dempsey appeared, usually as the top-billed leading man. Dempsey claimed Lon Chaney applied his makeup in the film, and said he had "a feather-like touch" compared to the other makeup men he worked with.

The serial is today mostly lost, with some incomplete segments (mainly chapters 1, 2 and 4) stored at University of California, Los Angeles. Lon Chaney does not appear in the existing footage, which is unfortunate as this was Lon Chaney's only appearance in a serial.

== Plot ==
Jack Derry, football star fullback, is working his way through college while supporting his mother at the same time. His father is in prison, serving time for a crime he did not commit. In the town lives an unscrupulous man named Leonard Billings, whose stepdaughter Glory possesses a bracelet which she found that bears half of the directions to an underground oil deposit. A criminal named Meeney has the other half, and sends his gang to steal her bracelet. Glory's stepfather learns of the bracelet and is plotting to steal it from her as well. When Glory is kidnapped, she is rescued by Jack Derry. Jack is shocked to learn that Glory's stepfather is responsible for his dad being falsely imprisoned.

In one chapter, Jack and Glory are captured in Indian territory by a gang of bandits led by the vicious Royce Rivers. Rivers tries to rape Glory in one sequence but she escapes and even manages to free Jack as well from the bandits' clutches. Later, Jack is arrested on a trumped up criminal charge, and Royce Rivers blackmails him, telling Jack if he gives him Glory's bracelet, he'll get him out of jail. Jack later learns that Royce Rivers also has a written document in his possession that can get Jack's father out of prison.

After a long series of chases and last-minute escapes, Leonard Billings learns the oil deposit is located under the farm of a man named Jim Collins. Before Billings can buy the property however, Jack buys it out from under him. In the end, Jack gets the evidence he needs to prove his father was innocent and gets him out of prison, and Leonard Billings and Royce Rivers both wind up getting arrested instead.

== Cast ==
- Jack Dempsey as Jack Derry
- Josie Sedgwick as Glory Billings
- Herschel Mayall as Leonard Billings
- Albert R. Cody as Edgar Billings
- Ruth Langdon as Ninette (as Ruth Langston)
- Edward Hearn as Cyril Dennison
- Lon Chaney as Royce Rivers
- Clyde Benson as The Butler
- Frank Lanning as MacManus, the Indian
- Aggie Herring as Mrs. Corcoran
- W. C. Robinson as Gang Member (as Spike Robinson)
- Al Kaufman as Gang Member
- S.E. Jennings as Gang Member
- Frank Coghlan Jr. (as Junior Coghlan)
- Edgar Kennedy
- Bull Montana as Sailor
- John George as Sailor
- Fred Starr (billed as Frederick Starr) Henchman
- Carl Stockdale

== Chapter titles ==
Chapter 1: The Mysterious Bracelets
Chapter 2: The Ball of Death
Chapter 3: Wheels of Fate
Chapter 4: Shanghaied
Chapter 5: The Race for Glory
Chapter 6: A Skirmish of Wits
Chapter 7: A Blow in the Dark
Chapter 8: Blinding Hate
Chapter 9: Phantoms of Treachery
Chapter 10: Paths of Destruction
Chapter 11: Flames of Wrath
Chapter 12: The Unseen Menace
Chapter 13: Baiting the Trap
Chapter 14: A Terrible Vengeance
Chapter 15: The Triple Chase

== Reception ==
"The star of the serial is surrounded by a coterie of players of ability and note, who fit without a wrinkle into the characterization of the...story. There are improbabilities in the plot, such as are found in the majority of screen serials, but the picture is well directed and thoroughly interesting." ---Moving Picture World

"Still another kind of serial. Not exactly subtle, this one, but if you are a small boy of any age, you'll enjoy Jack Dempsey, who can certainly withstand an awful lot of punishment." ---Photoplay
