= Annette DeFoe =

American actress (1888/89 – 1960)

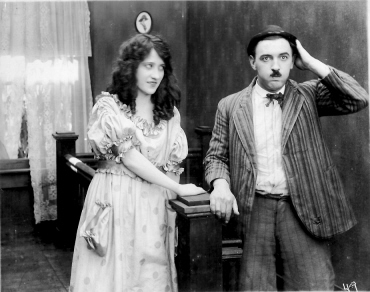
- Annette DeFoe and Josef Swickard in An Aerial Joy Ride
- Born: Gertrude Marie Aucoin; 1888 or 1889; Ohio, U.S.
- Died: August 6, 1960, aged 71; Los Angeles, California, U.S.
- Occupation: silent screen actress

Annette DeFoe (born Gertrude Marie Aucoin; 1888 or 1889 – August 6, 1960), also known as Annette De Foe, was an American silent screen actress, known for her work in early romantic comedies.

DeFoe acted in stock theater in New Orleans before going to Los Angeles to perform for the E & R Jungle Film Company. She debuted with that company in the farce Hitting the High Places. She also acted with the Kalem Company in Jacksonville, Florida. In the early 1902s, DeFoe had leading roles in films made by John M. Stahl and Louis B. Mayer.

DeFoe died on August 6, 1960, at age 71 at the Kaiser Foundation Hospital.

== Filmography ==
- One Clear Call (1922) – Yetta
- Lone Hand Wilson (1920) – Lolita Hansen
- Fame and Fortune (1918) – Mattie Carson
- Indiscreet Corinne (1917) – Florette
- The Girl in the Garret (1917)
- An Aerial Joy Ride (1917) – Daughter
- The Red Stain (1917)
- Social Pirates (1917)
