= One Shot Ross =

1917 film

- Directed by: Clifford Smith
- Written by: Lambert Hillyer
- Starring: Roy Stewart; Josie Sedgwick; Jack Richardson
- Cinematography: C.G. Crane
- Production company: Triangle Film Corporation
- Distributed by: Triangle Distributing
- Release date: October 14, 1917
- Running time: 50 minutes
- Country: United States
- Languages: Silent; English intertitles

One Shot Ross is a 1917 American silent Western film directed by Clifford Smith and starring Roy Stewart, Josie Sedgwick and Jack Richardson.

== Cast ==
- Roy Stewart as 'One Shot' Ross
- Josie Sedgwick as Nan Sheridan
- Jack Richardson as Jim Butler
- Louis Durham as Shorty
- William Ellingford as Mr. Sheridan
- Leo Willis as Briggs

== Bibliography ==
- Rainey, Buck. Sweethearts of the Sage: Biographies and Filmographies of 258 actresses appearing in Western movies. McFarland & Company, 1992.
