= The She Wolf (1919 film) =

1919 film

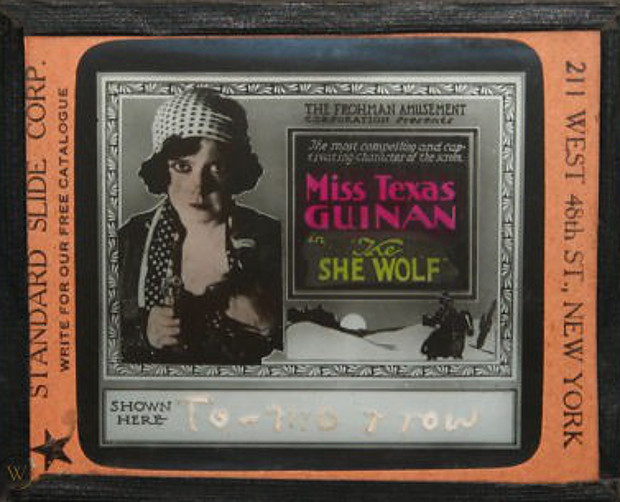
- Lantern slide
- Directed by: Clifford Smith
- Written by: John Colton; Raymond L. Schrock (scenario); Harvey F. Thew
- Produced by: William L. Sherrill (Frohman Amusement Co.)
- Cinematography: Stephen Rounds
- Distributed by: Merit Film Corporation
- Release date: May 10, 1919
- Running time: 2 reels
- Country: United States
- Languages: Silent; English intertitles

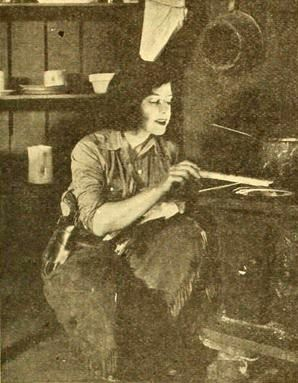
Film still with Texas Guinan

The She Wolf is a 1919 American short silent Western film starring Texas Guinan and directed by Clifford Smith.

== Plot ==
As described in a film magazine, The She Wolf (Guinan) walks into The Last Hope saloon and discovers its Chinese owner Mui Fing (Wing) and the sheriff (Richardson) cheating a Stranger (Chesebro) in a card game. Drawing her gun, she joins in the game, and in the fight that follows the Stranger is wounded. She takes him back to her shack and tends to him. Several days later the sheriff, who heads a band of outlaws, robs a mail coach and leaves some letters scattered on the road. The She Wolf picks one up and finds that it was written by Sallie Bigby (Wild) to her sweetheart John Williams. The letter says that Sallie's father is in the power of the Chinese saloon owner and that she will be compelled to marry him unless she is rescued. The She Wolf returns to the saloon and starts a second fight, and carries off Sallie to her cabin. Matters are then resolved when Sallie and her sweetheart meet and the Stranger letting it be known that he intends to marry the woman who nursed him back to health.

== Cast ==
- Texas Guinan as The She Wolf
- George Chesebro as The Stranger
- Ah Wing as Mui Fing
- Charles Robertson as Dud Bigby
- Anna Wild as Sallie Bigby
- Jack Richardson as Sheriff of Mad Dog
- Josie Sedgwick as Belle of the Dance Hall

== Reception ==
Variety's review of The Better Wife was positive about the technical aspects of the film, but found the material to be "old stuff."
