= Josie Sedgwick =

American actress

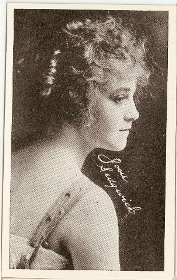
- c. 1917
- Born: 13 March 1898; Galveston, Texas, U.S.
- Died: 30 April 1973 (aged 74); Santa Monica, California, U.S.
- Occupation: Actress
- Years active: 1914–1932
- Known for: The Boss of the Lazy Y; Daredevil Jack; Wild Life
- Relatives: Edward Sedgwick (brother); Eileen Sedgwick (sister)

Josie Sedgwick (March 13, 1899 – April 30, 1973) was an American film actress. She appeared in more than 50 films from 1914 to 1932.

Her brother was actor/director Edward Sedgwick, and her sister was actress Eileen Sedgwick.

== Filmography ==
Film
Year	Title	Role	Notes
1917	The Boss of the Lazy Y	Betty Clayton	
1917	The Devil Dodger		
1917	Ashes of Hope	Belle	
1917	One Shot Ross	Nan Sheridan	
1917	Fighting Back	Dance-Hall Girl	
1917	Indiscreet Corinne	Pansy Hartley	
1917	The Maternal Spark	Clarice	
1918	The Man Above the Law	Esther Brown	
1918	Keith of the Border	Hope Waite / Christie McClaire	
1918	Paying His Debt	Nan Christy	
1918	Wolves of the Border	Ruth Warner	
1918	Hell's End	Mary Flynn	
1918	Beyond the Shadows	Eleanor Wyatt	
1918	Wild Life	Helen Martin	
1918	The Lure of the Circus	Alicia Page	
1919	The She Wolf	Belle of the Dance Hall	Short
1919	Kingdom Come	Glory Billings	Short
1919	Jubilo	Rose Hardy	
1920	Daredevil Jack	Glory Billings	
1920	The Lone Hand	Betty Hampton	
1921	Double Adventure	Martha Steadman	
1921	Western Hearts	Edith Caldwell	
1921	The Duke of Chimney Butte	Grace Kerr	
1922	The Crimson Clue	Marion Gray	
1923	Daddy	Helene Savelli	
1923	The Sunshine Trail	Woman Crook	
1923	Michael O'Halloran	Leslie Winton	
1924	The White Moth	Ninon Aurel	
1924	The Sawdust Trail	"Calamity" Jane Webster	
1925	The Saddle Hawk	Mercedes	
1925	Let 'er Buck	Miss Mabel Thompson	
1925	The Outlaw's Daughter	Flora Dale	
1925	Daring Days	Eve Underhill	
1932	Son of Oklahoma	Mary Clayton, aka Shotgun Mary	
