= The Duke of Chimney Butte =

1921 film

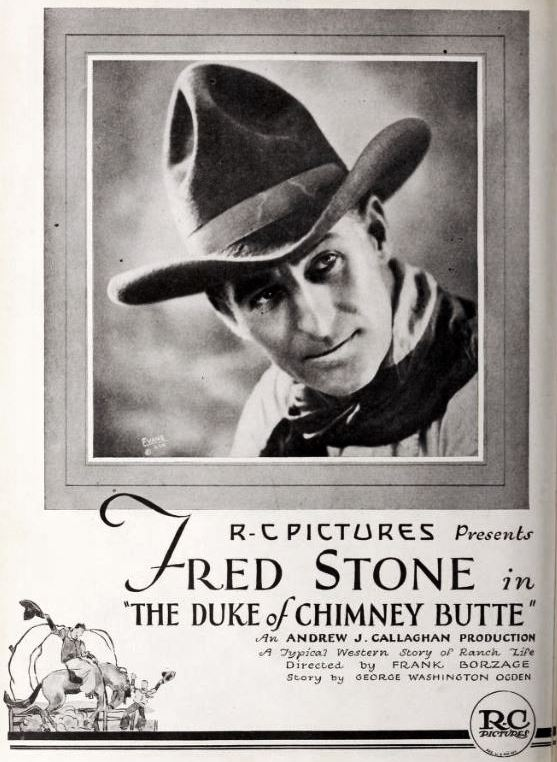
- Directed by: Frank Borzage
- Written by: Marian Ainslee
- Based on: The Duke of Chimney Butte by George Washington Ogden
- Produced by: Fred Stone
- Starring: Fred Stone; Vola Vale; Josie Sedgwick
- Cinematography: Jack MacKenzie
- Production company: Fred Stone Productions
- Distributed by: Robertson-Cole Distributing Corporation
- Release date: December 4, 1921
- Running time: 50 minutes
- Country: United States
- Languages: Silent; English intertitles

The Duke of Chimney Butte is a 1921 American silent Western film directed by Frank Borzage and starring Fred Stone, Vola Vale and Josie Sedgwick.

== Cast ==
- Fred Stone as Jeremeah Lambert
- Vola Vale as Vesta Philbrook
- Josie Sedgwick as Grace Kerr
- Chick Morrison as Kerr - the son
- Buck Connors as Taters
- Harry Dunkinson as Jedlick

== Preservation ==
With no holdings located in archives, The Duke of Chimney is considered a lost film.

== Bibliography ==
- Munden, Kenneth White. The American Film Institute Catalog of Motion Pictures Produced in the United States, Part 1. University of California Press, 1997.
