= The Little Girl Next Door (1916 film) =

- Directed by: Richard Foster Baker; M. Blair Coan
- Production company: Essanay Studios
- Release date: May 1916
- Running time: 6 reels
- Country: USA
- Language: Silent (English intertitles)

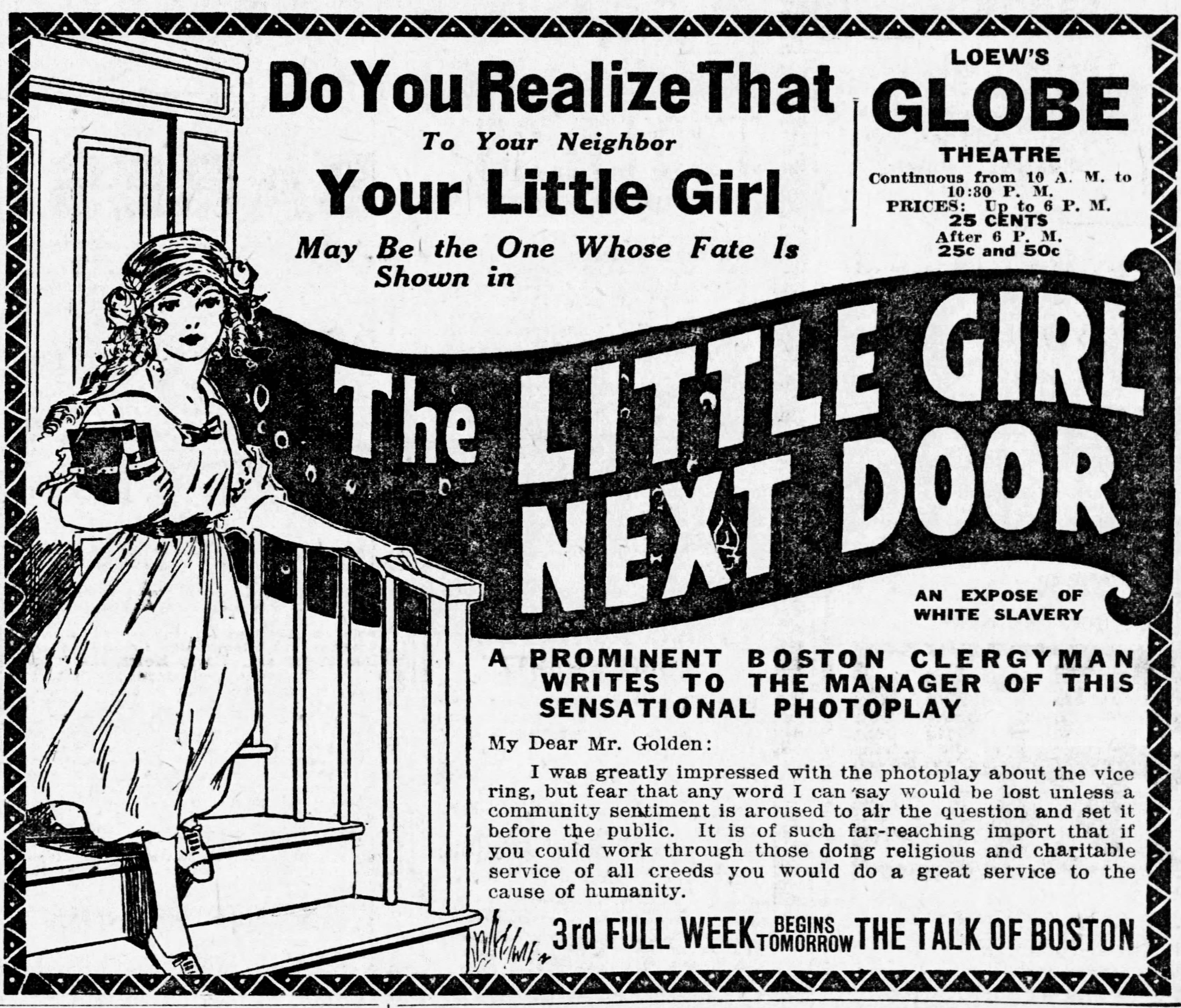
Ad that ran in the Boston Globe for The Little Girl Next Door

The Little Girl Next Door is a 1916 American silent drama 6-reel film on white slavery directed by Richard Foster Baker and M. Blair Coan.

Based on the findings of the Illinois Vice Commission, the film features screen appearances by "two congressmen, several Illinois senators, the mayor and chief of police of Chicago, the entire investigation body, the Illinois legislature in a body, and a host of social welfare workers in the Illinois metropolis", according to coverage at the time.

== Cast ==
The cast includes:

- Fritzi Ridgeway as The Little Girl Next Door
- Peggie Sweeney as Annie
- Royal Douglas as The Hawk
- Darwin Karr as The State's Attorney
- Warda Howard as Marica Moore
- John Lorena as The Gambier
- Jane Thomas as The Shopgirl
- As themselves:
  - Vice-President of the United States, Thomas R. Marshall
  - Speaker of the House, Champ Clark
  - Congressman James R. Mann, author of the "Mann White Slave act"
  - Congressman L. C. Dyer, of St. Louis
  - Governor Edward F. Dunne, of Illinois
  - Lieutenant Governor Barratt O'Hara, of Illinois
  - Secretary of State Lewis G. Stevenson, of Illinois
  - William Hale Thompson, Mayor of Chicago
  - Samuel A. Ettelson, Corporation Counsel of Chicago
  - John Dill Robertson, Health Commissioner of Chicago
  - C. C. Healy, Chief of Police of Chicago
  - Alderman James Lawley, of Chicago
  - Roy D. Keehn, Chicago attorney
  - Edward A. Beall, Mayor of Alton, Illinois
  - Senator Niels Juul, Chicago
  - Senator D. T. Woodward, Benton, Illinois
  - Senator F. Jeff Tossey, Toledo, Illinois
  - St. Clair Drake, Secretary, Illinois Board of Health
  - Bishop Samuel Fallows, of Illinois
  - Arthur Burrage Farwell, Chicago
  - Rev. Melbourne P. Boynton, Woodlawn Baptist Church, Chicago
  - Rev. Alice Phillips Aldrich, Chicago
  - Wirt W. Hallam, Chicago
  - Judge Uhlir, of the Chicago Morals Court
  - Judge Hopkins, of the Chicago Morals Court
  - Florence King
  - Virginia Brooks, Joan d'Ark of East Hammond, Illinois
  - Rev. Elmer Williams, Chicago
  - Anna Dwyer, Chicago Morals Court
  - Maud Cain Taylor

== Censorship ==
Before The Little Girl Next Door could be exhibited in Kansas, the Kansas State Board of Review required the removal of the struggle scenes between men and the girls, and to shorten the fight scene on the stairs.
