= South of Santa Fe (1932 film) =

1932 film

- Directed by: Bert Glennon
- Written by: George Arthur Durlam
- Produced by: Trem Carr
- Starring: Bob Steele; Ed Brady; Eddie Dunn
- Cinematography: Archie Stout
- Edited by: Bert Glennon
- Production company: Trem Carr Pictures
- Distributed by: Sono Art-World Wide Pictures
- Release date: January 8, 1932
- Running time: 60 minutes
- Country: United States
- Language: English

South of Santa Fe is a 1932 American western film directed by Bert Glennon and starring Bob Steele, Ed Brady and Eddie Dunn. It was made by the producer Trem Carr and distributed by the independent Sono Art-World Wide Pictures.

== Plot ==
A man is killed for his map of the site of a gold mine, but only half the map is found. Meanwhile, Tom Keene arrives, and helps the daughter of the murdered man.

== Cast ==
- Bob Steele as Tom Keene
- Janis Elliott as Beth Thornton
- Ed Brady as Jack Stone
- Eddie Dunn as Lankey
- Al Bridge as Henchman Bully
- Gordon De Main as Granger
- Chris-Pin Martin as Pedro
- John Elliott as Thornton
- Al Ernest Garcia a Captain Felipe Mendezez Gonzales Rodrigues
- Hank Bell as Henchman
- Bob Burns as Cowhand
- Jack Evans as Granger Cowhand
- Al Haskell as Messenger
- Perry Murdock as Henchman
- Archie Ricks as Henchman
- F.R. Smith as Granger Rider
- Slim Whitaker as John Roberts

== Bibliography ==
- Fetrow, Alan G. . Sound films, 1927-1939: a United States Filmography. McFarland, 1992.
- Pitts, Michael R. Western Movies: A TV and Video Guide to 4200 Genre Films. McFarland, 1986.
