= Ed Brady (actor) =

American actor (1889–1942)

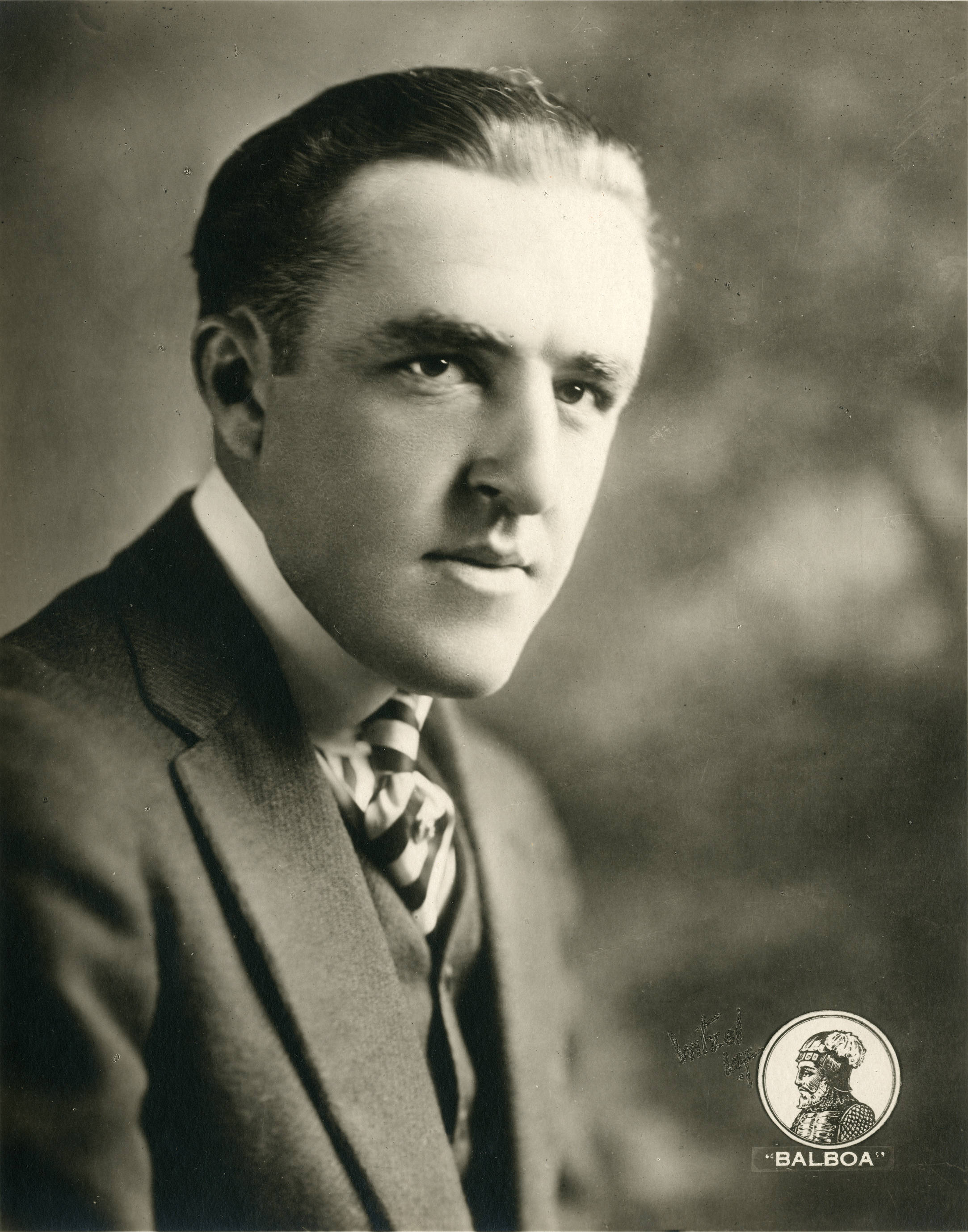
- Brady in 1916
- Born: Edwin J. Brady; December 6, 1889; New York City, U.S.
- Died: March 31, 1942 (aged 52); Los Angeles, California, U.S.
- Occupation: Actor
- Years active: 1911–1942

Edwin J. Brady (December 6, 1889 – March 31, 1942) was an American film actor. He appeared in more than 350 films between 1911 and 1942. On Broadway, he appeared in The Spy (1913).

== Filmography ==
- The Heart of a Cracksman (1913)
- The Test (1914)
- A Child of the Prairie (1915) - The Gambler
- Neal of the Navy (1915) - Hernandez
- Spellbound (1916) - Katti Hab
- The Twin Triangle (1916) - Marco
- The Sultana (1916) - Count Strelitso
- The Mainspring (1916) - Jerviss
- The Double Room Mystery (1917) - Bill Greely
- God's Crucible (1917) - Wilkins
- Mutiny (1917) - Eben Wiggs
- The Flame of Youth (1917) - McCool
- The Reed Case (1917) - 'Red'
- The Stolen Paradise (1917) - Leroux
- The Spindle of Life (1917) - Jason
- Wild Sumac (1917) - John Lewisa
- Indiscreet Corinne (1917) - P.A. Britton
- The Learnin' of Jim Benton (1917) - Harvey Knowles
- The High Sign (1917) - Hugo Mackensen
- The Gun Woman (1918) - The Bostonian
- The Shoes That Danced (1918) - Wedge Barker
- Faith Endurin' (1918) - Edward Crane
- Who Killed Walton? (1918) - Austin Booth
- Old Hartwell's Cub (1918) - Steve Marvin
- Everywoman's Husband (1918)
- Marked Cards (1918) - John Acton
- Beyond the Shadows (1918) - Horace Du Bois
- Wild Life (1918) - Steve Barton
- The Grey Parasol (1918) - Rodger Irwin
- Deuce Duncan (1918) - John
- Diane of the Green Van (1919)
- When Bearcat Went Dry (1919)
- The Kentucky Colonel (1920)
- Cheated Love (1921)
- The Silent Call (1921)
- The Rough Diamond (1921)
- The Kiss (1921)
- Over the Border (1922)
- The Pride of Palomar (1922)
- To the Last Man (1923)
- Fools Highway (1924)
- The Dancing Cheat (1924)
- The Price She Paid (1924)
- Stolen Secrets (1924)
- Mantrap (1926)
- Whispering Canyon (1926)
- The Winning of Barbara Worth (1926)
- The Rose of Kildare (1927)
- Hoof Marks (1927)
- The King of Kings (1927)
- The Noose (1928)
- The Bushranger (1928)
- The Code of the Scarlet (1928)
- The Spieler (1928)
- Alibi (1929)
- Thunderbolt (1929)
- The Virginian (1929)
- The Trespasser (1929)
- Dynamite (1929)
- City Girl (1930)
- The Texan (1930)
- Abraham Lincoln (1930)
- The Last of the Duanes (1930)
- The Spoilers (1930)
- Whoopee! (1930)
- An American Tragedy (1931)
- The Squaw Man (1931)
- Desert Vengeance (1931)
- Red-Headed Woman (1932)
- Forbidden Trail (1932)
- Destry Rides Again (1932)
- The Phantom President (1932)
- Frisco Jenny (1932)
- South of Santa Fe (1932)
- The Match King (1932)
- Oliver Twist (1933)
- Parachute Jumper (1933)
- One Sunday Afternoon (1933)
- Before Dawn (1933)
- Night Flight (1933)
- Penthouse (1933)
- Tillie and Gus (1933)
- Bombshell (1933)
- Son of Kong (1933)
- Spitfire (1934)
- George White's Scandals (1934)
- Treasure Island (1934)
- The Whole Town's Talking (1935)
- Naughty Marietta (1935)
- Public Hero ﹟1 (1935)
- The Arizonian (1935)
- Klondike Annie (1936)
- Sutter's Gold (1936)
- Fury (1936)
- Come and Get It (1936)
- Conquest (1937)
- Wells Fargo (1937)
- Riders of the Dawn (1937)
- In Old Chicago (1938)
- Marie Antoinette (1938)
- Little Miss Broadway (1938)
- The Texans (1938)
- If I Were King (1938)
- The Mad Miss Manton (1938)
- The Cowboy and the Lady (1938)
- The Buccaneer (1938)
- Blockade (1938)
- The Adventures of Huckleberry Finn (1939)
- Stagecoach (1939)
- The Oklahoma Kid (1939)
- Union Pacific (1939)
- Rose of Washington Square (1939)
- Blackmail (1939)
- The Arizona Kid (1939)
- Frontier Marshal (1939)
- Tower of London (1939)
- The Invisible Man Returns (1940)
- Abe Lincoln in Illinois (1940)
- Dark Command (1940)
- Forty Little Mothers (1940)
- Saps at Sea (1940)
- When the Daltons Rode (1940)
- North West Mounted Police (1940)
- Pot o' Gold (1941)
- Billy the Kid (1941)
- The Get-Away (1941)
- Honky Tonk (1941)
- Sullivan's Travels (1941)
- Reap the Wild Wind (1942)
- The Spoilers (1942)
- Tombstone, the Town Too Tough to Die (1942)
- In Old California (1942)
- Apache Trail (1942)
- The Forest Rangers (1942)
