= Daddy (1923 film) =

1923 film

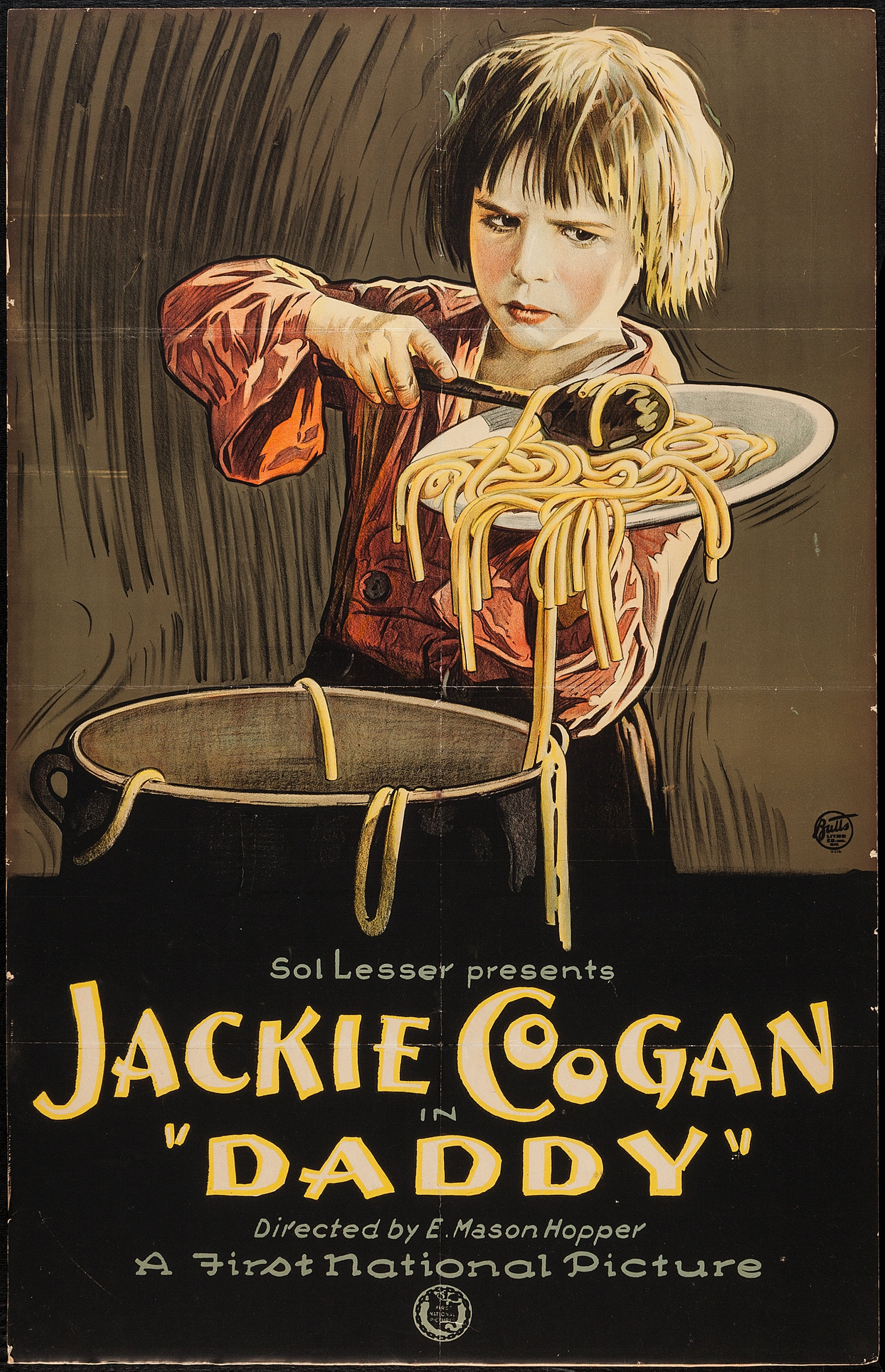
- Directed by: E. Mason Hopper
- Story by: Jack Coogan Sr. Lillian Coogan
- Produced by: Sol Lesser
- Starring: Jackie Coogan; Arthur Edmund Carewe; Josie Sedgwick; Cesare Gravina
- Cinematography: Frank B. Good; Robert Martin
- Edited by: Irene Morra
- Distributed by: Associated First National Pictures
- Release date: March 26, 1923
- Running time: 60 minutes
- Country: United States
- Languages: Silent; English intertitles

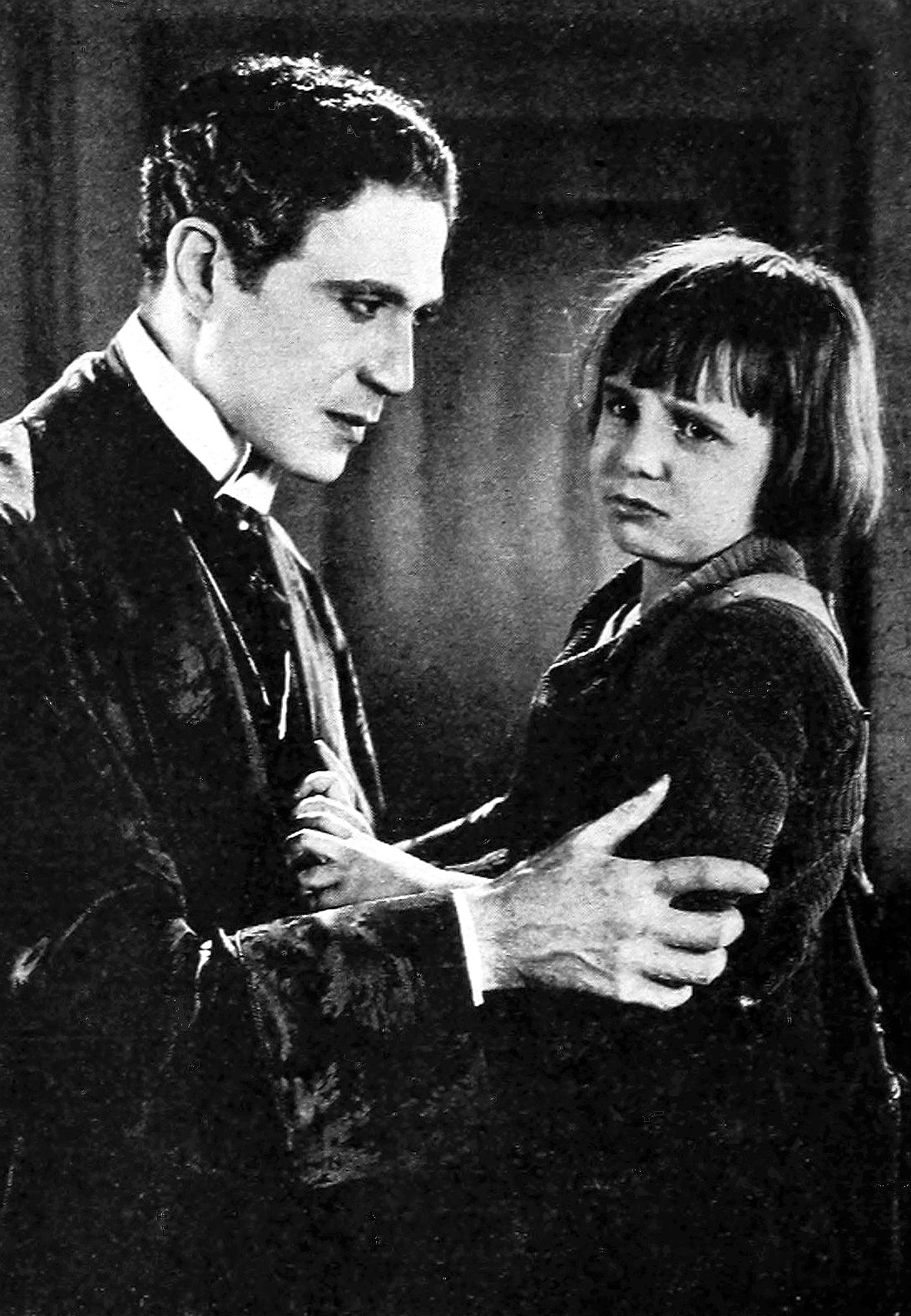
A scene from Daddy

Daddy is a 1923 American silent drama film directed by E. Mason Hopper for Associated First National Pictures. It stars Jackie Coogan, Arthur Edmund Carewe, Josie Sedgwick, and Cesare Gravina. The script was written by Jackie Coogan's parents, Jack and Lillian. Coogan plays the son of a poor violin teacher who is separated from his father when his parents break up their marriage, only to be reunited again when his father makes it as a famous musician. The film was shot on six reels. A print exists in the UCLA Film & Television Archive.

== Storyline ==
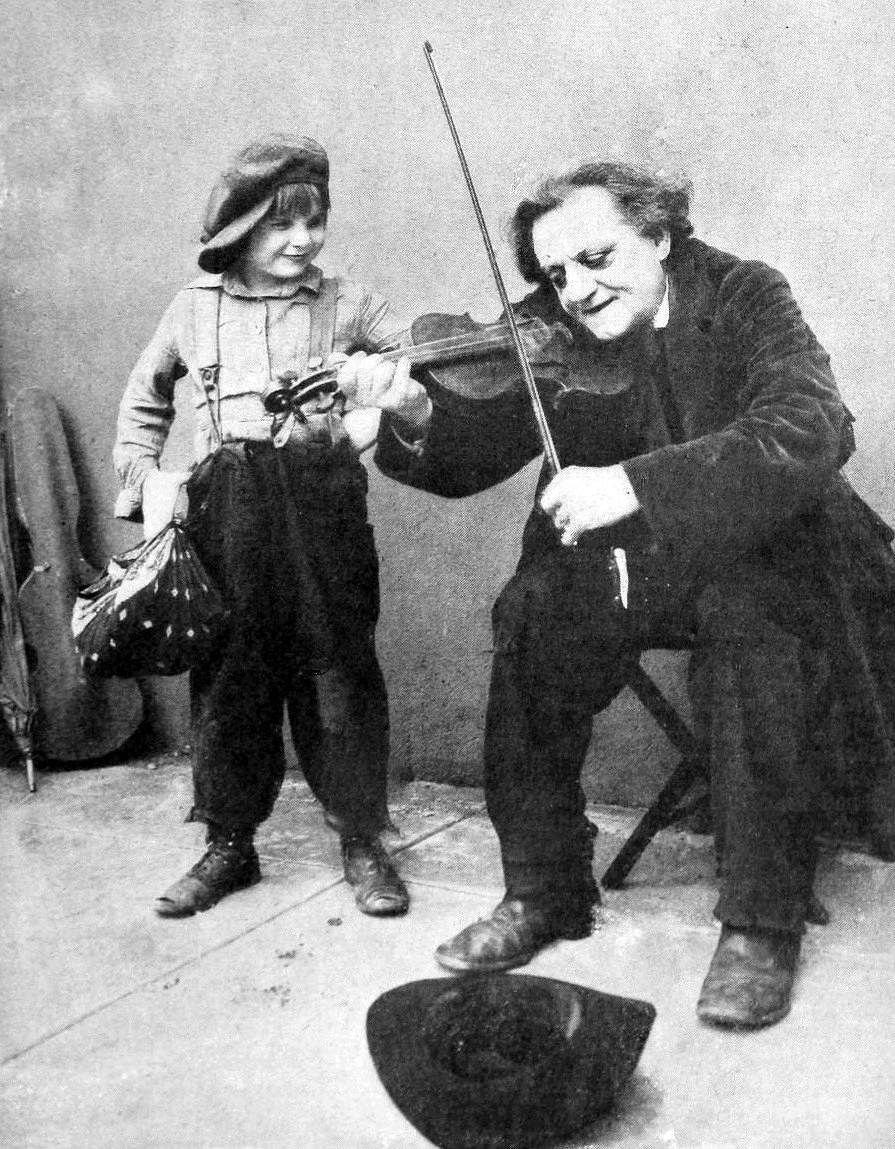
Still

Paul, a violin teacher with great musical talent, teaches music and performs to earn a living for his family. Helene, his wife, views her husband's love for music as a competitor for his affections. She comes to believe that Paul's attention to his students and the admiration he receives after a performance are leading him away from their marriage, so she leaves home with their baby son, Jackie. Paul tries to find his family, but there is no trace of them.

Helene took Jackie to the country home of her parents' friends, the Holdens. Jackie has a happy life on their farm, but knows nothing about his father. The boy discovers an old violin in his mother's possessions and tries to play it. Though it makes his mother sad to see Jackie with the violin, the boy is determined to master the instrument. After the death of his mother when Jackie was eight years old; he continued living with the Holdens. When the boy became aware that the older couple was struggling with expenses, he tried to find a way to make things easier for them. Jackie remembered a teacher at school saying that despite his never having any music lessons, he played the violin well enough to make a fine living at it. He packed his violin and a picture of his mother and set off on foot for New York City to try his luck there.

By the time he arrived in the city, he had earned some money by playing in the towns he stopped at on his way. When Jackie heard wonderful violin music on a New York City street corner, he discovered an older gentleman named Cesare playing there for pennies. Cesare welcomed him as a fellow music lover and sensed immediately that Jackie was all alone in the big city. He took the boy home with him. Jackie told Cesare about his mother and the Holdens and Cesare told him about the great violinists he had known. Cesare put Jackie to work on fingering exercises and scales; the two musicians played on the street together during the day and went home together each evening.

When Cesare learned his great violinist friend would be performing in New York, he managed to buy two second-balcony tickets for himself and the boy. There the two enjoyed the performance with Cesare taking Jackie to the stage door to meet his friend. When the musician made his exit, he hastily saw only the outstretched hand of Cesare and not his face. Thinking him to be a beggar, he gave him a coin. Cesare believed that his friend had rebuffed him and became very upset. He began shaking, with Jackie somehow getting him home and realizing that his friend needed the care of a doctor.

The boy then set out to earn enough money for Cesare's doctor visit. He took his violin and began playing for pennies in front of the theater where the great violinist was performing. When the musician arrived for the second performance of the evening, his trained ear made him get out of his car to listen to Jackie playing. He began asking questions of the boy, with Jackie telling him he was playing to earn enough money to pay for a doctor to come to his home to treat Cesare, who was very ill. He then explained that he and Cesare were at the stage door earlier and that the musician did not recognize his old friend.

The musician asked to be taken to Cesare, who was dying. Before he died, Cesare realized that he had not been forgotten by his old friend; he asked the musician to take Jackie and look after him. With his second performance canceled, the musician took the young boy to his home. As the boy was being put to bed in the musician's bedroom, he saw a picture of a woman on the man's dresser and exclaimed it was a photo of his mother. Jackie reached into his bag where he carried his violin and brought out the photo of his mother; it was an identical copy.

== Cast ==
- Jackie Coogan as Jackie Savelli/Jackie Holden
- Arthur Edmund Carewe as Paul Savelli
- Josie Sedgwick as Helene Savelli
- Cesare Gravina as Cesare Gallo
- Bert Woodruff as Eben Holden
- Anna Townsend as Mrs. Holden
- Willard Louis as Impresario
- George Kuwa as Valet

== Reception ==
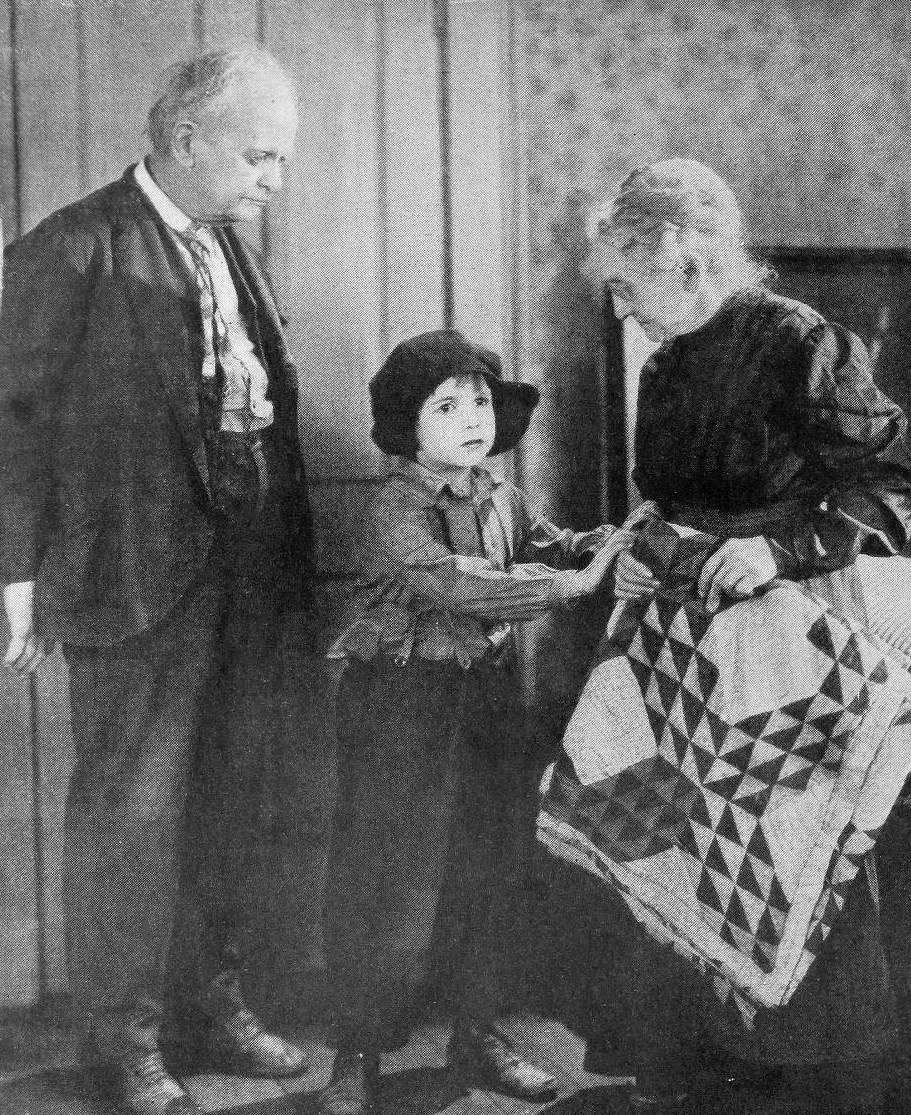
The film was viewed by critics as one of Coogan's best

A commercial and critical success, it was the 5th highest grossing American film of 1923 at the box office after Safety Last!. The Daily Independent of Murphysboro, Illinois praised the full cast, believing Hopper's "directorial genius" to have brought out the best in everybody. They stated that Coogan possessed an "undiminished power" as a star which "draw[s] to him all classes and ages and both sexes". The Daily Courier of Connellsville, Pennsylvania stated that the film is "richer in opportunities than any previous Jackie Coogan vehicle and reported that spectators at the theatres were "thrilled to hushed silence when little Jackie moved through the scene in which his guardian passes away and Jackie finds his real daddy". The newspaper declared that the film will "live in our memory forever". The Galveston Daily News of Galveston, Texas, concurred, calling it a "charming story", and remarked that it is "probably the first photodrama to be written by the parents of a famous star, and for that star". The Evening Standard of Uniontown, Pennsylvania noted the "deep pathos and real humor" displayed in the picture.
