= Jubilo =

1919 film directed by Clarence G. Badger

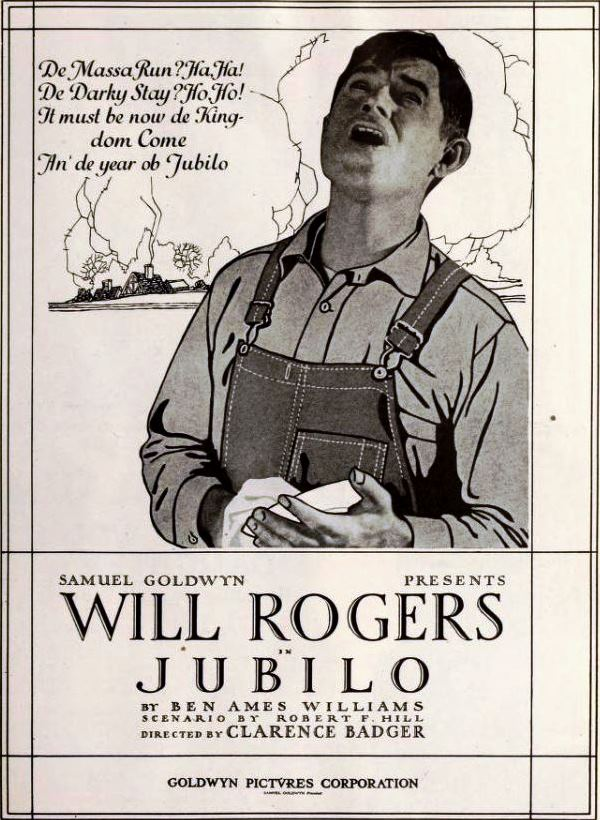
- Advertisement
- Directed by: Clarence G. Badger
- Screenplay by: Robert F. Hill
- Based on: Jubilo by Ben Ames Williams
- Produced by: Samuel Goldwyn
- Starring: Will Rogers; Josie Sedgwick; Charles K. French; Willard Louis; James Mason
- Cinematography: Marcel Le Picard
- Production company: Goldwyn Pictures
- Distributed by: Goldwyn Pictures
- Release date: December 7, 1919
- Running time: 50 minutes (Five to six reels)
- Country: United States
- Language: Silent (English intertitles)

Jubilo is a 1919 American silent comedy film directed by Clarence G. Badger and written by Robert F. Hill. The film stars Will Rogers, Josie Sedgwick, Charles K. French, Willard Louis, and James Mason. The film was released on December 7, 1919, by Goldwyn Pictures.

In 2021, the film was selected for preservation in the United States National Film Registry by the Library of Congress as being "culturally, historically, or aesthetically significant".

== Cast ==
- Will Rogers as Jubilo
- Josie Sedgwick as Rose Hardy
- Charles K. French as Jim Handy
- Willard Louis as Punt
- James Mason as Bert Rooker

Jubilo (1919)
