= The Unpainted Woman =

1919 film

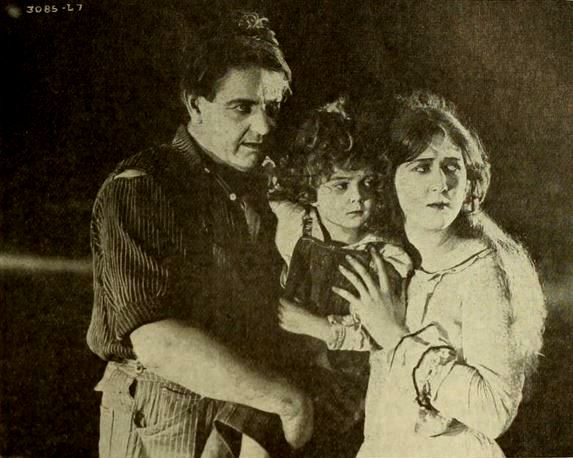
- Film still
- Directed by: Tod Browning
- Written by: Sinclair Lewis; Allen G. Siegler; Waldemar Young
- Produced by: Universal Pictures
- Starring: Mary MacLaren; Thurston Hall
- Cinematography: Alfred Gosden; Allen G. Siegler
- Distributed by: Universal Film Manufacturing Company
- Release date: May 26, 1919
- Country: United States
- Language: Silent (English intertitles)

The Unpainted Woman is a 1919 American drama film directed by Tod Browning that is based upon a story by Sinclair Lewis. It is not known whether the film currently survives, which suggests that it is a lost film.

== Plot ==
As described in a film magazine, Gudrun Trygavson is a beautiful Swedish girl living in the American wheat country where she is employed as a "hired girl" by Mrs. Hawes. Charley Holt, son from one of the best families in Mullinsdale, cares for Gudrun and asks her to a dance. When Mrs. Hawes informs Charley's mother and sister of this, at the dance the sister cuts in to separate Charley from Gudrun. Charley becomes determined to marry Gudrun, but after they are wed his snobbish relatives cut them off. Charley gets a menial job as a mill worker, and Gudrun and he try to make the best of things, but their life is miserable due to Charley's drinking.

A child is born to them, but after five years of hard drinking, Charley is fatally injured in a saloon fight, circumstances which distress Gudrun. Gudrun takes up a small farm with a cabin on it, and works the wheat fields to support her and her child. A "bird of passage" named Martin O'Neill comes to the farm, and Gudrun feeds him. In return, he assists in the work and helps bring in the harvest, and when the barn catches fire, saves Gudrun and her child.

Martin is suspected of starting the fire, and narrowly survives an attempted lynching by the excited townspeople. It is then discovered that the fire was started by a jealous rival. Gudrun and Martin are later wed.

== Cast ==
- Mary MacLaren as Gudrun Trygavson
- Thurston Hall as Martin O'Neill
- David Butler as Charley Holt
- Laura La Varnie as Mrs. Holt (as Laura Lavarnie)
- Fritzi Ridgeway as Edna (as Fritzie Ridgway)
- Willard Louis as Helnie Lorber
- Carl Stockdale as Pliny
- Lydia Yeamans Titus as Mrs. Hawes
- Michael D. Moore as Olaf (as Mickey Moore)
