= Fame and Fortune (film) =

1918 film by Lynn F. Reynolds

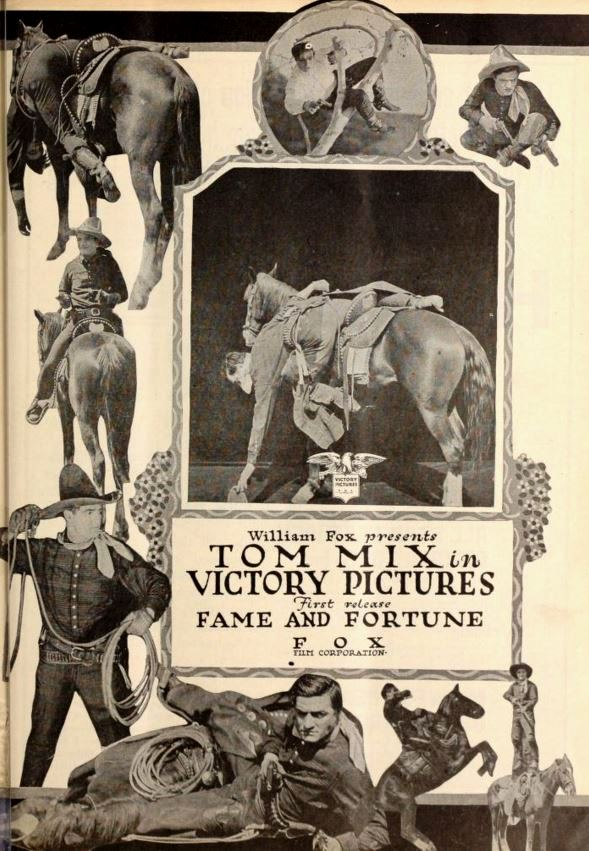
- Advertisement for Fame and Fortune in Exhibitors Herald
- Directed by: Lynn Reynolds
- Written by: Bennett Cohen
- Based on: Slow Burgess by Charles Alden Seltzer
- Starring: Tom Mix; Kathleen Connors; George Nicholls
- Production company: Fox Film Corporation
- Distributed by: Fox Film Corporation
- Release date: October 20, 1918
- Running time: 5 reels
- Country: United States
- Languages: Silent film (English intertitles)

Fame and Fortune is a 1918 American silent Western film directed by Lynn Reynolds and starring Tom Mix, Kathleen Connors, and George Nicholls based on the short story Slow Burgess by Charles Alden Seltzer which was later published in 1926. The film was released by Fox Film Corporation on October 20, 1918.

== Cast ==
- Tom Mix as Clay Burgess
- Kathleen Connors as Della Bowen
- George Nicholls as "Big" Dave Dawley
- Charles McHugh as Judge Quinn
- Annette DeFoe as Mattie Carson
- Val Paul as Flash Denby
- Jack Dill as Ben Davis
- E. N. Wallock as Kuneen
- Clarence Burton as Sheriff of Palo

== Preservation ==
It is unknown if the film survives, but is presumed lost.
