= Hal Roach =

American filmmaker (1892–1992)

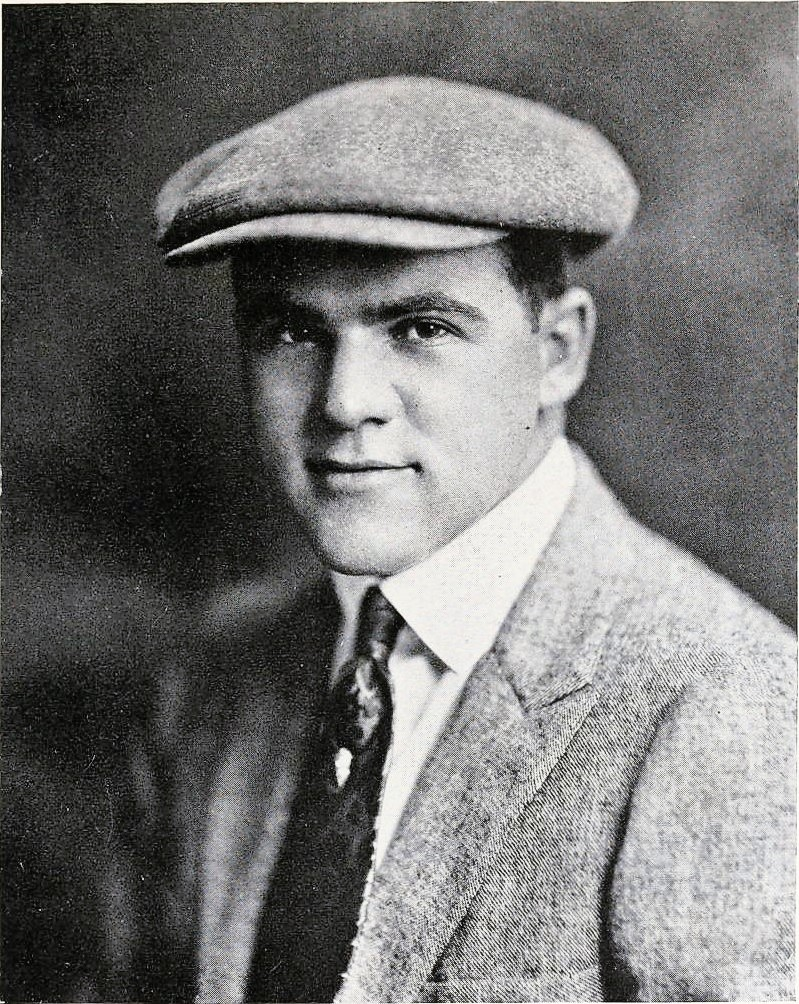
- Roach in 1920
- Born: Harold Eugene Roach; January 14, 1892; Elmira, New York, U.S.
- Died: November 2, 1992 (aged 100); Los Angeles, California, U.S.
- Resting place: Woodlawn Cemetery
- Occupations: Producer; director; screenwriter
- Years active: 1912–1992
- Spouses: Marguerite Nichols (m. 1915; died 1941); Lucille Prin (m. 1942; died 1981)
- Children: 6, including Hal and Margaret
- Relatives: Robert Livingston (former-son-in-law)

Harold Eugene "Hal" Roach Sr. (January 14, 1892 – November 2, 1992) was an American film and television producer, director, and screenwriter, who was the founder of the namesake Hal Roach Studios.

Roach was active in the industry from the 1910s to the 1990s. He is known for producing a number of early media franchise successes, including Laurel and Hardy, Harold Lloyd, Charley Chase, and the Our Gang kids.

== Early life ==
Roach was born in Elmira, New York, to Charles Henry Roach, whose father was born in Wicklow, County Wicklow, Ireland, and Mabel Gertrude Bally, whose father John Bally hailed from Switzerland. A presentation by the American humorist Mark Twain impressed elementary-school student Roach. Hal's first job was delivering newspapers. One of the subscribers lived at Quarry Farm - Samuel Clemens, more widely known as "Mark Twain".

== Early career ==
After an adventurous youth that took him to Alaska, Roach arrived in Hollywood in 1912 and began working as an extra in silent films.

When Hal Roach came to Southern California at the age of 20, he had reached the tail end of a four-year trek across America, which took him from his hometown of Elmira, New York to Alaska, and down the Pacific Coast. Along the way, he picked up the know-how necessary to land work as an extra in a J. Warren Kerrigan western, which was being filmed on location in the desert. It was here that he first met fellow player Harold Lloyd, the first of many talents whom Hal Roach would nurture and build a fortune on. During the filming of a roulette sequence, Roach got himself promoted to the position of technical advisor by pointing out that the ball has to travel in the opposite direction of the wheel – knowledge he had gained in San Francisco's Barbary Coast.

== Rolin Film Company ==
On July 23, 1914, Roach incorporated Rolin Film Company with partners Dan Linthicum and I.H. Nance. The brand name Rolin combined the names of partners Roach and Linthicum.

In 1914, the Lewis Leonard Bradbury (November 6, 1823 – July 15, 1892) mansion, on the corner of Court Street and Hill Street, Bunker Hill, Los Angeles, California, was Roach's film studio.

In 1915 Roach inherited $3000 (about $100,000 in 2026). Now solvent, he began producing short film comedies with his friend Harold Lloyd, who portrayed a tramp character known as Willie Work, as in Willie Runs the Park.

== Pathé ==
In 1915, Roach sold his production Just Nuts to Pathé Exchange, leading to a long-standing distribution arrangement.

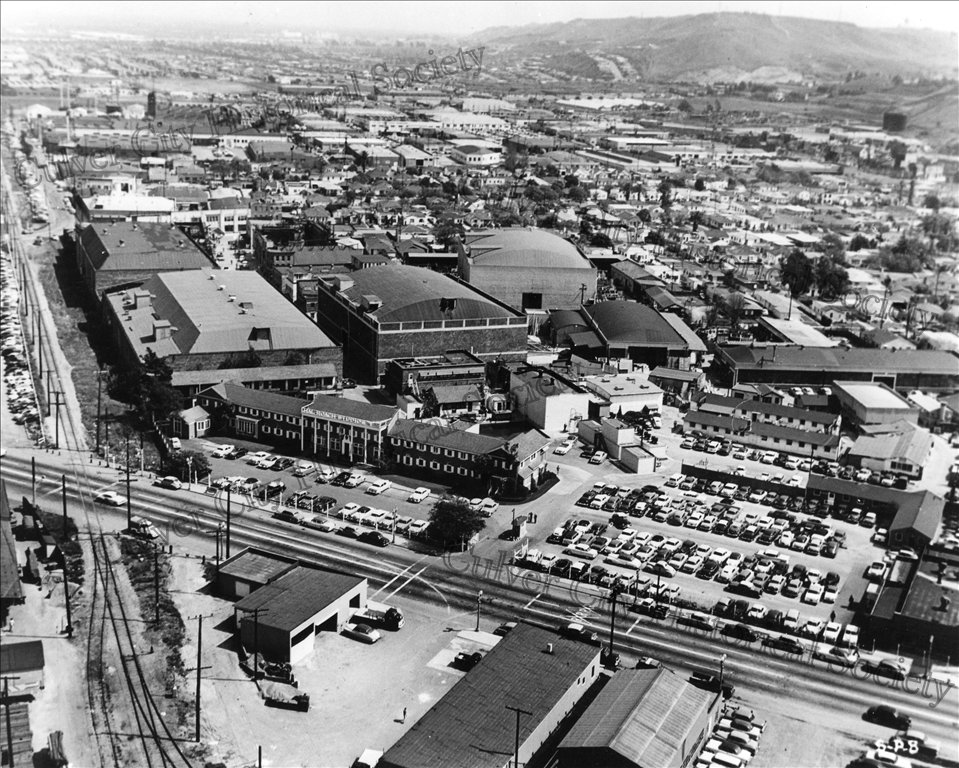
The Hal Roach Studios (1919–1963) in 1959

Unable to expand his studios in Downtown Los Angeles because of zoning, Roach leased several studio sites in the Los Angeles area until he purchased what became the Hal Roach Studios from Harry Culver in Culver City, California, at 8822 Washington Boulevard, and built by 1920.

== Success with Harold Lloyd and others ==
Harold Lloyd created Lonesome Luke, a fresh-kid comedy character in an ill-fitting suit, having slapstick misadventures much as Charlie Chaplin had in the Keystone comedies. The Lonesome Luke comedies were so ubiquitous -- Roach made a new single-reel comedy every week -- that they caught on with moviegoers, and Pathé asked for more of them at double the length. Finally, in 1917, Lloyd created his most famous screen character, the hapless young man in the horn-rimmed glasses. These new comedies were Roach's most popular of all, and Roach and Lloyd collaborated on short subjects, featurettes, and feature films until 1923, when Lloyd became his own producer.

During the 1920s and 1930s, Roach starred Snub Pollard, Charley Chase, Chase's brother Jimmie Parrott, Will Rogers, Max Davidson, the Our Gang kids, Harry Langdon, Thelma Todd, ZaSu Pitts, Patsy Kelly and, most famously, Laurel and Hardy. During the 1920s, Roach's biggest rival was producer Mack Sennett. In 1925, Roach hired Sennett's supervising director, F. Richard Jones.

== Metro-Goldwyn-Mayer ==
Roach had been releasing his films through Pathé Exchange -- and so was his chief competitor Mack Sennett. Each producer was unwittingly cutting into the other's business. Roach resolved the situation in June 1927, by striking a distribution deal with Metro-Goldwyn-Mayer, which wanted to add a line of short comedies to its offerings. This was mutually beneficial: MGM got proven short-subject attractions, and Roach got more exposure for his productions. Roach converted his silent-movie studio to sound in late 1928 and began releasing talking shorts in early 1929.

Roach fulfilled the remainder of his Pathé contract by cobbling together new releases taken from uncompleted or unreleased films sitting on the shelf. For example, a Snub Pollard comedy made in 1923, The Old War-Horse, finally saw the light of day in 1926, after Pollard had left Roach's employ. Pathé, noticing how Roach's new MGM comedies were catching on with the public, took its time releasing Roach's Laurel and Hardy subjects to capitalize on the actors' increasing name value. The last of the team's Pathé comedies, Flying Elephants, was filmed in May 1927 but held back from release until February 1928.

== Innovations ==
Hal Roach was always thinking ahead, as demonstrated by his many innovations in motion-picture production and salesmanship. In the spring of 1929 he planned to make a talking western feature film -- Roach had made the occasional outdoor adventure in the mid-1920s, in silent pictures, but this would be his first attempt at a talking feature. Roach offered the leading role to cowboy superstar William S. Hart, who had been in retirement since 1925. Hart signed a $75,000 contract with Roach in May 1929, with the expectation that Hart's old colleague Lambert Hillyer would be on hand to direct. The project was canceled when Roach's distributor, Metro-Goldwyn-Mayer, intervened. MGM executive Nicholas Schenck wired Roach: "Sorry you have undertaken to produce a talking western picture, because we would not be interested in it, and we do not think you should undertake to make pictures for anybody else. If you have already signed, then you have our consent to release this one elsewhere, but we do not expect you to do this again." Hart consented to the cancellation and forfeited the salary agreed upon. According to columnist Louella Parsons, "The Metro-Goldwyn-Mayer officials explained it was not a personal reflection against Hart, but rather an earnest belief that these western thrillers were no longer what the public wanted." Schenck's opinion is puzzling because Fox had already made a successful talking western, In Old Arizona (released in January 1929 and nominated for five Academy Awards); however, MGM had already dismissed its own western star Tim McCoy, so Schenck appears to have followed company policy in declining Hart's services.

Hal Roach also instituted a lucrative sideline: selling his comedies to international exhibitors by making special, all-talking versions in different languages. Each American film was reshot in Spanish, French, and occasionally Italian and German. Laurel & Hardy, Charley Chase, and the Our Gang kids (some of whom had barely begun school) were required to recite the foreign dialogue phonetically, often reading from blackboards hidden off-camera. The supporting casts would usually be actors from other nations, speaking their native languages. MGM, seeing Roach's proficiency with these international releases, asked him to direct -- but not produce -- its own outdoor talking feature, Men of the North (1930). Roach staged the film in five different languages: English, Spanish, French, German, and Italian.

Roach was delighted by the response to his continental comedies. International exhibitors welcomed them, and moviegoers were pleased and amused to hear the comedians speaking the native language of the audience. "It was an expensive operation to do every scene four times," recalled Roach. "It cost us three times as much. But the prices we got in South American countries and Spain were fantastic. A Laurel and Hardy short in the Argentine would be [treated] like a feature picture. But finally Metro-Goldwyn-Mayer made us quit, because the other countries said, 'We don't want dubbed pictures from Metro. We get them not dubbed from Hal Roach,' So I stopped. The people in the Argentine were very indignant, but then they began dubbing the pictures, as they did in the other countries."

== Feature films ==
In 1931, with the release of the Laurel & Hardy film Pardon Us -- also filmed in multiple languages -- Roach began producing occasional full-length features alongside the short subjects. Two-reel comedies were less profitable than features, and Roach phased out almost all of his shorts production in 1936 to focus on feature production. Roach's comedy stars Laurel & Hardy and Patsy Kelly were moved into features full-time, while Charley Chase was let go. (He moved to Columbia Pictures.) Roach also borrowed major players from other studios to star in his new features, such as Virginia Bruce and Robert Young (Vagabond Lady, 1935) and Jack Haley (Mr. Cinderella, 1936; Pick a Star, 1937). The most successful non-Laurel & Hardy Roach-MGM features both starred Constance Bennett: Topper (1937), which also starred Cary Grant, and Merrily We Live (1938), co-starring Brian Aherne.

The only exception to the termination of Roach's shorts program was Our Gang, which MGM wanted Roach to continue producing. Roach agreed to continue the kid-comedy series in a shorter single-reel (10-minute) format if MGM would release an Our Gang feature, General Spanky. The feature was not a success, and the Our Gang series remained in the one-reel short format.

Roach was also a good friend to Walt Disney, who was a fan of Laurel and Hardy at the time. A monkey dressed in a Mickey Mouse costume as well as child actors in Three Little Pigs costumes appeared in Roach's 1934 Laurel and Hardy film Babes in Toyland. Mickey Mouse, in animated form, also appeared in the MGM feature Hollywood Party, also from 1934 and also featuring Laurel and Hardy.

== Mussolini ==
In 1937, Renato Senise, nephew of Carmine Senise, the then deputy chief of the Italian police, conceived a joint business venture of Roach partnering with Vittorio Mussolini, son of fascist Italian dictator Benito Mussolini, to form a production company called "R.A.M." (Roach and Mussolini). On 11 September 1937, Roach and Vittorio Mussolini formed R.A.M. Productions.

Roach claimed the scheme involved Italian bankers providing US$6 million that would enable Roach's studio to produce a series of 12 films. Eight would be for Italian screening only while the remaining four would receive world distribution. The first film for Italy was to be a feature film of the opera Rigoletto.

The Hollywood Anti-Nazi League for the Defense of American Democracy resented Mussolini's presence and placed notices in various trade magazines: "He asked for – and received – the privilege of being the first aviator to bomb helpless Ethiopians ... his presence here is not an occasion for celebration or social fetes. Those who welcome him are opening their arms to a friend of Hitler and an enemy of democracy."

Roach defended himself by saying:

You don't know, but that I might have dinner with Mussolini when I go back to Italy. Maybe I can suggest to him that Hitler is not going quite right about things and maybe Mussolini will write Hitler a note and tell him so... I never made a move in Europe in this matter at any time without the advice and cooperation of some of the most prominent Jews there who told me I was doing the finest thing ever done in their estimation — tying up with Mussolini's son and taking the boy back to Hollywood...

This proposed business alliance with Mussolini alarmed MGM, which intervened and forced Roach to buy his way out of the venture. Loews chairman Nicholas Schenck was so upset with this incident, combined with the underperformance of much of Roach's latest feature-film output to that point (except the Laurel & Hardy titles and Topper), that he ultimately canceled Roach's distribution contract with MGM.

== United Artists ==
Hal Roach offered his own explanation: "As the short comedies became a drug on the market [due to double-feature programs], we slowly dropped them. In order to keep the studio going, we had to do feature productions. We were releasing our pictures through Metro, and they were our distributing agents. But they made their own features; they were not interested in Hal Roach making features for them. I moved from Metro to United Artists."

In May 1938, Roach sold MGM the production rights and actors contracts to the Our Gang shorts.

From 1938 to 1940, Roach attempted to expand upon the successes of Topper and Merrily We Live by concentrating on producing glossy features, abandoning low comedy almost completely. Most of his new films were either sophisticated farces (The Housekeeper's Daughter, 1939) or rugged action fare (like Captain Fury, 1939, and One Million B.C., 1940). Roach's one venture into heavy drama was the acclaimed Of Mice and Men (1939), in which actors Burgess Meredith and Lon Chaney Jr. played the leading roles. The Laurel and Hardy comedies, once the Roach studio's biggest drawing cards, were now the studio's least important product and were phased out altogether in 1940.

In 1940, Roach experimented with medium-length featurettes, running 40 to 50 minutes each. He contended that these "streamliners", as he called them, would be useful in double feature situations where the main attraction was a longer-length epic. Exhibitors agreed with him and used Roach's mini-features to balance top-heavy double bills. He had intended to introduce the new format with a series of four Laurel and Hardy featurettes, but was overruled by United Artists, which insisted on two Laurel & Hardy feature films instead. United Artists continued to release Roach's streamliners through 1943. By this time, Roach no longer had a resident company of comedy stars and cast his films with familiar featured players (notably William Tracy and Joe Sawyer, Johnny Downs, Jean Porter, Frank Faylen, William Bendix, George E. Stone, Bobby Watson, Douglas Fowley, and Veda Ann Borg).

In 1943 Roach, recognizing the value of his film library, began licensing revivals of his older productions for theatrical distribution through Film Classics, Inc. and home-movie distribution.

== World War II ==
Hal Roach Sr., commissioned in the U.S. Army Signal Reserve Corps in 1927, was called back to active military duty in the Signal Corps in June 1942, at age 50. The studio output he oversaw in uniform was converted from entertainment featurettes to military training films. The studios were leased to the U.S. Army Air Forces, and the First Motion Picture Unit made 400 training, morale, and propaganda films at "Fort Roach." Members of the unit included Ronald Reagan and Alan Ladd. After the war the government returned the studio to Roach, with millions of dollars of improvements.

In 1946, Hal Roach resumed motion picture production, with former Harold Lloyd co-star Bebe Daniels as an associate producer. Roach was the first Hollywood producer to adopt an all-color production schedule, making four streamliners in Cinecolor, although the increased production costs did not result in increased revenue. "We lost about a million dollars," said Roach.

== Television ==
In 1948, with his studio deeply in debt, Roach re-established his studio for television production, with Hal Roach Jr., producing series such as The Stu Erwin Show, Steve Donovan, Western Marshal, Racket Squad, The Public Defender, The Gale Storm Show, Rocky Jones, Space Ranger and My Little Margie, and independent producers leasing the facilities for such programs as Amos 'n' Andy, The Life of Riley and The Abbott and Costello Show. By 1951, the studio was producing 1,500 hours of television programs a year, nearly three times Hollywood's annual output of feature movies.

Roach's old theatrical films were also early arrivals on television. His Laurel and Hardy comedies were very successful in television syndication, as were the Our Gang comedies he produced from 1929 to 1938.

== Later years ==
In 1955, Roach sold his interests in the production company to his son, Hal Roach Jr., and retired from active production. The younger Roach lacked much of his father's business acumen and was forced to sell the studio in 1958 to The Scranton Corporation, a division of the automobile-parts conglomerate F. L. Jacobs Co. The Roach studio finally shut down in 1961.

For two more decades, Roach Sr. occasionally worked as a consultant on projects related to his past work. In 1983 the "Hal Roach Studios" name was reactivated as a video concern, pioneering the new field of colorizing movies. Roach lent his film library to the cause but was otherwise not involved in the new video productions. Extremely vigorous into an advanced age, Roach contemplated a comedy comeback at 96.

In 1984, 92-year-old Roach was presented with an honorary Academy Award. Former Our Gang members Jackie Cooper and George "Spanky" McFarland made the presentation to a flattered Roach, with McFarland thanking the producer for hiring him 53 years prior. An additional Our Gang member, Ernie Morrison, was in the crowd and started the standing ovation for Roach. Years earlier Cooper had been the youngest Academy Award nominee ever for his performance in Skippy when he had been under contract with Roach. Although Paramount had paid Roach $25,000 for Cooper's services in that film, Roach paid Cooper only his standard salary of $50 per week.

On January 21, 1992, Roach was a guest on The Tonight Show Starring Johnny Carson, guest-hosted by Jay Leno, one week after his 100th birthday. During the interview, Roach recounted experiences with such stars as Stan Laurel and Jean Harlow; he even did a brief, energetic demonstration of the "humble hula" dance. In February 1992, Roach traveled to Berlin to receive the honorary award of the Berlinale Kamera for Lifetime Achievement at the 42nd Berlin International Film Festival.

On March 30, 1992, Roach appeared at the 64th Academy Awards ceremony, hosted by Billy Crystal. When Roach rose from the audience to a standing ovation, he decided to give a speech without a microphone, causing Crystal to quip, "I think that's appropriate because Mr. Roach started in silent films."

== Personal life ==
In 1916, Roach's mother and father moved into a house on the Roach studio grounds in Culver City, living there until their death.

In September 1916, Roach married actress Marguerite Nichols, who worked as an actress in the 1930s and 1940s, and died in March 1941. They had two children, Hal Roach Jr., who followed his father as a producer and director, and Margaret Roach.

Roach married a second time, on September 1, 1942, to Lucille Prin, a Los Angeles secretary. They were married at the on-base home of Colonel Franklin C. Wolfe and his wife at Wright-Patterson Airfield in Dayton, Ohio, where Roach was stationed at the time while serving as a major in the United States Army Air Corps. Roach and Lucille had four children, Elizabeth Carson Roach (December 26, 1945 – September 5, 1946), Maria May Roach (born April 14, 1947), Jeanne Alice Roach (born October 7, 1949), and Kathleen Bridget Roach (born January 29, 1951).

== Death ==
Hal Roach died in his home in Bel Air, Los Angeles, from pneumonia, on November 2, 1992, at the age of 100. He had married twice, and had six children, eight grandchildren, and a number of great-grandchildren. Roach outlived three of his children by more than 20 years: Hal Jr. (died in 1972), Margaret (died in 1964), and Elizabeth (died in 1946). He also outlived many of the children who starred in his films. Roach is buried in Woodlawn Cemetery in Elmira, New York, where he grew up.

== Legacy ==
In the 2018 Laurel and Hardy biopic Stan & Ollie, Roach was portrayed by Danny Huston.

In 2020, Rose McGowan alleged that, in 1937, Roach was responsible for a case of large-scale sexual abuse of actresses. The closest link to such accusations against him is that an infamous sex party was held by MGM at the Hal Roach Ranch, which was used by the company as a studio. This is also in relation to one of the earliest reports of rape in Hollywood, filed by blacklisted dancer and extra Patricia Douglas, which was later covered in the documentary Girl 27, a production McGowan herself has praised for educating on sexual abuse in Hollywood.

== Bibliography ==
- A Tribute to Hal Roach. Gallery of Modern Art. 1965.
- Everson, William K. (1971). The Films of Hal Roach. Museum of Modern Art. ISBN 978-0-87070-559-5.
- Ward, Richard Lewis (August 15, 2006). A History of the Hal Roach Studios. Carbondale, IL: Southern Illinois University Press. ISBN 9780809388066.
- Craig Calman. 100 Years of Brodies with Hal Roach. BearManor Media, Albany, GA, 2014, 2017
- MacGillivray, Scott, Laurel & Hardy: From the Forties Forward, iUniverse, 2009
