= Wild Life (1918 film) =

1918 film

- Directed by: Henry Otto
- Written by: Charles J. Wilson Jr. (scenario); M. V. Dearing (story)
- Starring: William Desmond; Josie Sedgwick; Ed Brady
- Cinematography: Steve S. Norton
- Production company: Triangle Film Corp.
- Release date: August 25, 1918 (US)
- Running time: 5 reels
- Country: United States
- Languages: Silent; English intertitles

Wild Life is a 1918 American silent Western film directed by Henry Otto and written by Charles J. Wilson Jr. and M. V. Dearing. The film stars William Desmond, Josie Sedgwick, and Ed Brady.

== Cast list ==
- William Desmond as Chick Ward
- Josie Sedgwick as Helen Martin
- Ed Brady as Steve Barton
- Dot Hagar as Mae Garcon
- Orral Humphreys as Red Kelley
- Graham Pettie as Al
- Eddie Peters as Jack
- Bill Patton as Bill
