= When Doctors Disagree =

1919 film by Victor Schertzinger

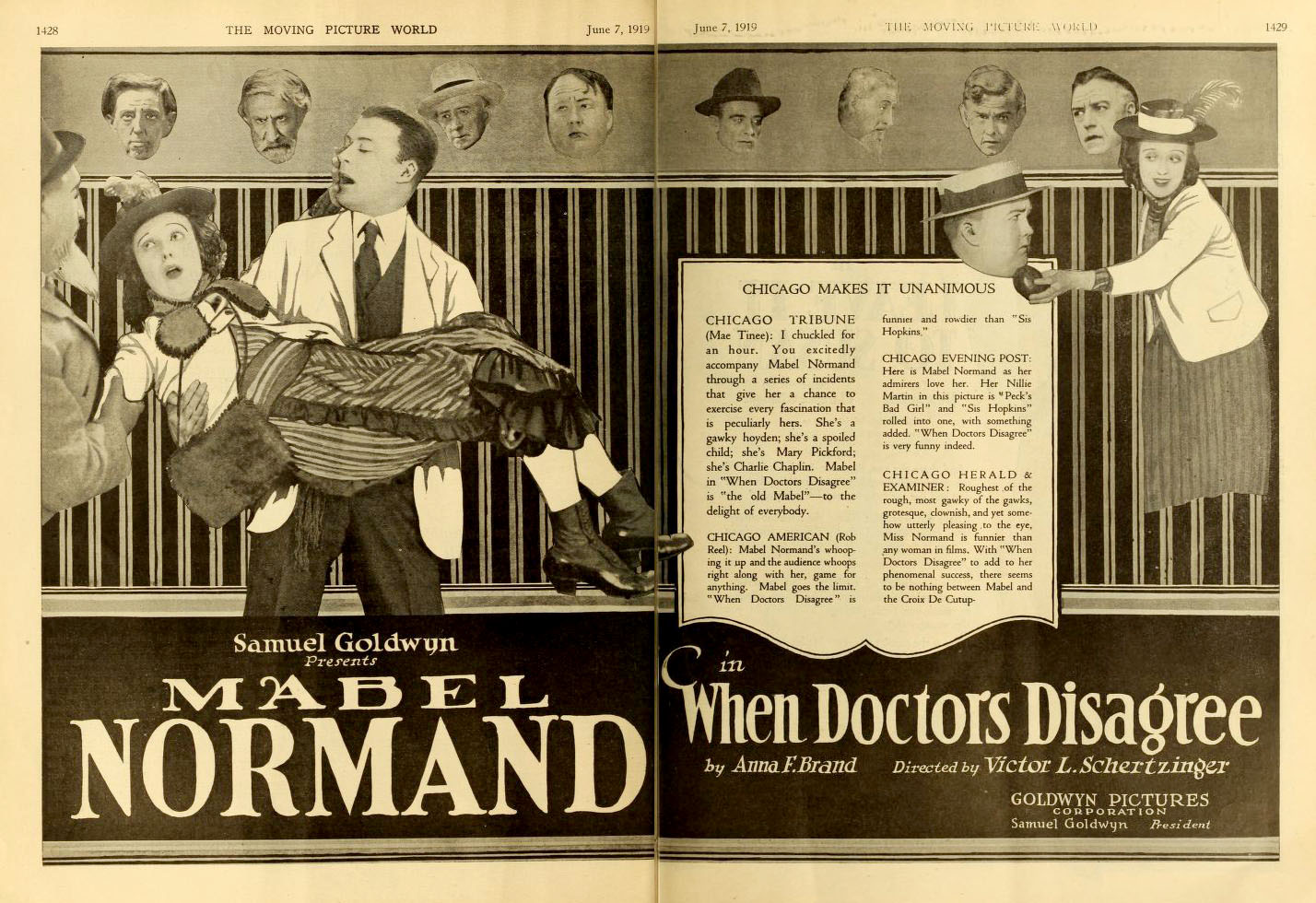
- 1919 advertisement
- Directed by: Victor Schertzinger
- Screenplay by: Anna F. Briand
- Starring: Mabel Normand
- Cinematography: Percy Hilburn (French)
- Distributed by: Goldwyn Pictures Corporation
- Release date: May 25, 1919
- Running time: 50 minutes
- Country: United States
- Language: Silent (English intertitles)

When Doctors Disagree is a 1919 silent comedy film directed by Victor Schertzinger, written by Anna F. Briand, photographed by Percy Hilburn, and starring Mabel Normand. The movie was released by the Goldwyn Pictures Corporation with a running time of 50 minutes. A print of the film survives in the Cinémathèque Royale film archive.

== Plot ==
As described in a film magazine, Violet Henny, the village miser's haughty daughter, as Queen of the May will not admit Millie Martin, the ragged daughter of old man David Martin, to her May Pole party, Millie breaks up the party. The next day she accompanies her father on the train to a nearby town to pay off the mortgage. While on the train she falls in love with chubby John Turner, a young man who believes that he has committed a murder and is fleeing disguised as his uncle, who is a noted surgeon. Millie feigns a serious illness and the supposed doctor recommends an immediate operation, hoping to get the young woman off the train at the next town. He succeeds, but is also detrained to assist in the operation. After numerous remarkable incidents at the small town hospital, the couple are revealed as engaged.

== Cast ==
- Mabel Normand as Millie Martin
- Walter Hiers as John Turner
- George Nichols as David Martin
- Fritzi Ridgeway as Violet Henny
- Alec B. Francis as Dr. Harris, Sr.
- William Buckley as Dr. Harris, Jr.
- James Gordon
