= Indiscreet Corinne =

1917 silent film

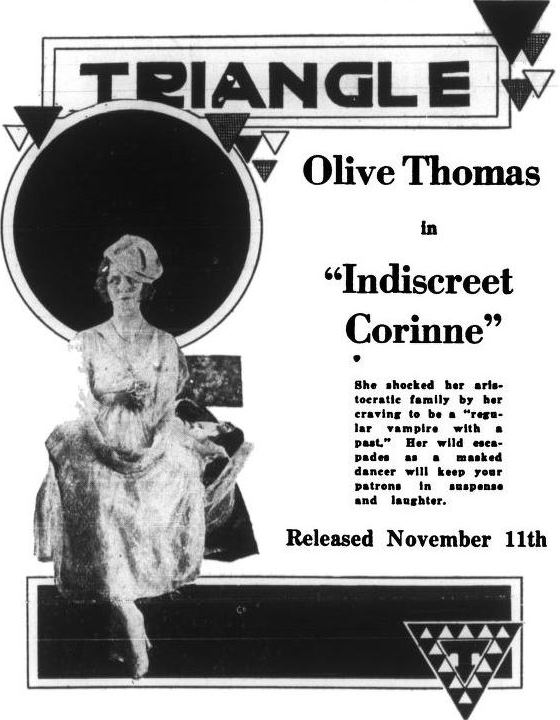
- Directed by: John Francis Dillon
- Written by: H.B. Daniel; George Elwood Jenks
- Starring: Olive Thomas; George Chesebro; Josie Sedgwick
- Cinematography: Tom Buckingham
- Production company: Triangle Film Corporation
- Distributed by: Triangle Distributing
- Release date: November 11, 1917
- Running time: 50 minutes
- Country: United States
- Languages: Silent; English intertitles

Indiscreet Corinne is a 1917 American silent comedy film directed by John Francis Dillon and starring Olive Thomas, George Chesebro and Josie Sedgwick.

== Cast ==
- Olive Thomas as Corinne Chilvers
- George Chesebro as Nicholas Fenwick
- Joseph Bennett as Rocky Van Sandt
- Josie Sedgwick as Pansy Hartley
- Annette DeFoe as Florette
- Lillian Langdon as Mrs. Chilvers
- Tom Guise as Mr. Chilvers
- Lou Conley as Aunt Theodora
- Thornton Edwards as 'Live Wire' Dodge
- Ed Brady as P.A. Britton
- Harry L. Rattenberry as Mr. Cotter Brown
- Anna Dodge as Mrs. Cotter Brown

== Bibliography ==
- Robert B. Connelly. The Silents: Silent Feature Films, 1910-36, Volume 40, Issue 2. December Press, 1998.
