= Ruggles of Red Gap (1923 film) =

1923 film directed by James Cruze

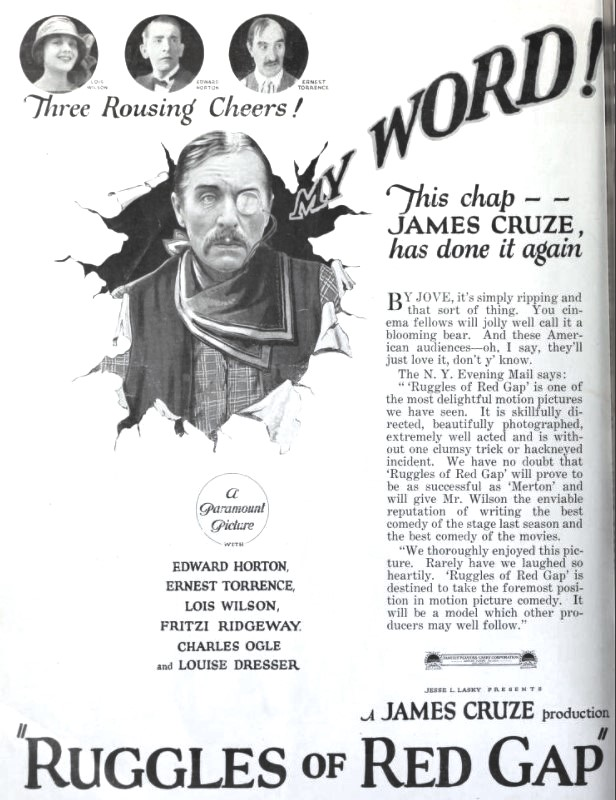
- Advertisement
- Directed by: James Cruze
- Screenplay by: Anthony Coldeway; Walter Woods
- Based on: Ruggles of Red Gap; 1915 novel by Harry Leon Wilson
- Produced by: James Cruze
- Starring: Edward Everett Horton; Ernest Torrence; Lois Wilson; Fritzi Ridgeway; Charles Stanton Ogle; Louise Dresser; Anna Lehr; William Austin
- Cinematography: Karl Brown
- Edited by: Dorothy Arzner
- Production company: Famous Players–Lasky Corporation
- Distributed by: Paramount Pictures
- Release date: August 7, 1923
- Running time: 80 minutes
- Country: United States
- Languages: Silent; English intertitles

Ruggles of Red Gap is a 1923 American silent Western film directed by James Cruze and written by Anthony Coldeway and Walter Woods that was adapted from the novel by Harry Leon Wilson. The film stars Edward Everett Horton, Ernest Torrence, Lois Wilson, Fritzi Ridgeway, Charles Stanton Ogle, Louise Dresser, Anna Lehr, and William Austin. The film was released on October 7, 1923, by Paramount Pictures.

== Plot ==
An English valet brought to the American west assimilates into the American way of life.

== Cast ==
- Edward Everett Horton as Ruggles
- Ernest Torrence as Cousin Egbert Floud
- Lois Wilson as Kate Kenner
- Fritzi Ridgeway as Emily Judson
- Charles Stanton Ogle as Jeff Tuttle
- Louise Dresser as Mrs. Effie Floud
- Anna Lehr as Mrs. Belknap-Jackson
- William Austin as Mr. Belknap-Jackson
- Lillian Leighton as Ma Pettingill
- Thomas Holding as Earl of Brinstead
- Frank Elliott as Honorable George
- Kalla Pasha as Herr Schwitz
- Sidney Bracey as Sam Henshaw
- Milton Brown as Sen. Pettingill
- Guy Oliver as Judge Ballard

== Production ==
Ruggles of Red Gap was filmed on location near Eureka, California.

== Preservation ==
With no prints of Ruggles of Red Gap located in any film archives, it is a lost film.
