= Burning Words =

1923 film

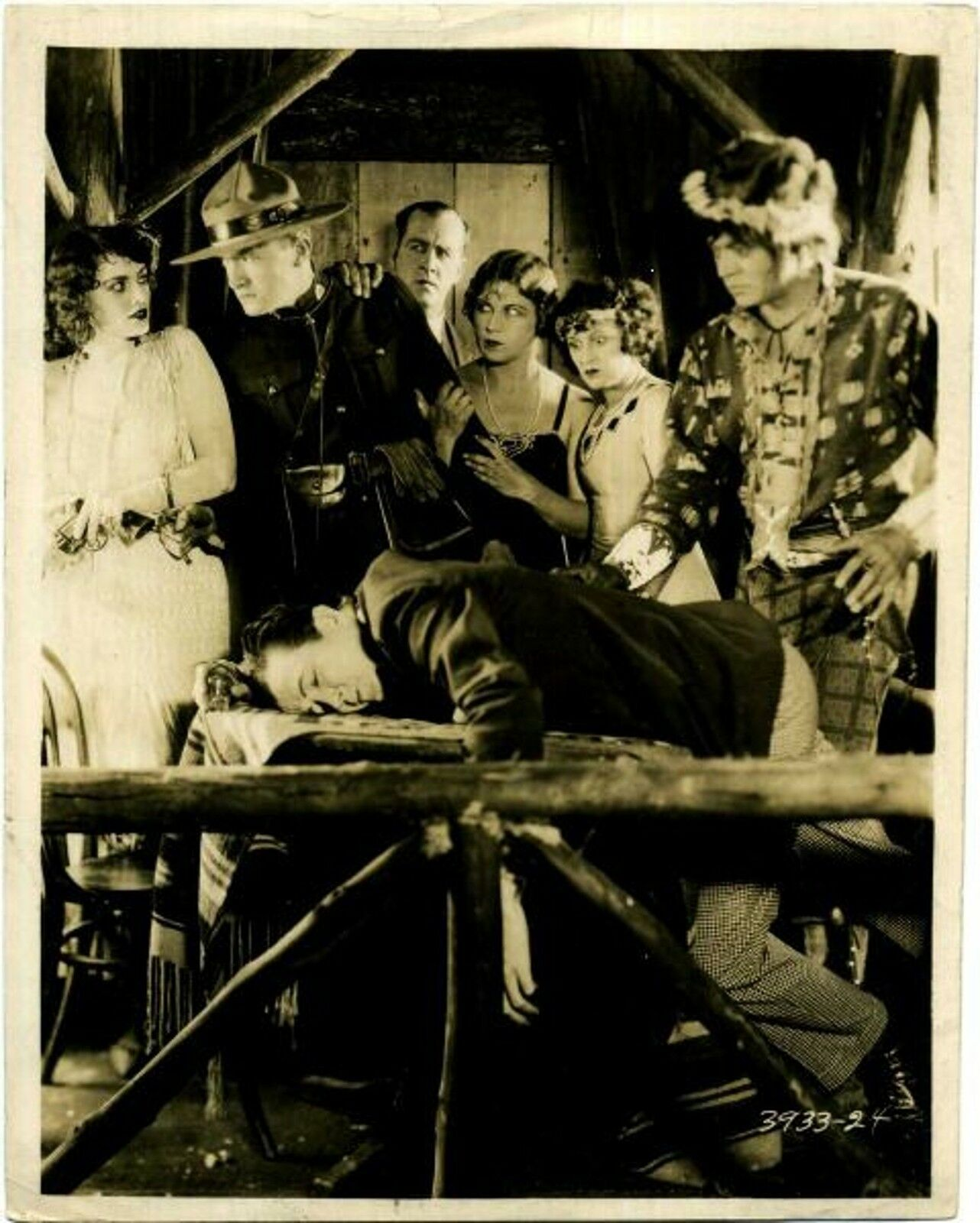
- Directed by: Stuart Paton
- Written by: Harrison Jacobs
- Produced by: Carl Laemmle
- Starring: Roy Stewart; Laura La Plante; Harold Goodwin
- Cinematography: William Thornley
- Production company: Universal Pictures
- Distributed by: Universal Pictures
- Release date: May 27, 1923
- Running time: 50 minutes
- Country: United States
- Languages: Silent; English intertitles

Burning Words is a 1923 American silent Western film directed by Stuart Paton and starring Roy Stewart, Laura La Plante, and Harold Goodwin.

== Cast ==
- Roy Stewart as David Darby
- Laura La Plante as Mary Malcolm
- Harold Goodwin as Ross Darby
- Edith Yorke as Mother Darby
- Alfred Fisher as Father Darby
- William Welsh as John Malcolm
- Noble Johnson as Bad Pierre
- Eve Southern as Nan Bishp
- Harry Carter as Slip Martin
- George A. McDaniel as Mounted-Police Sergeant Chase

== Preservation ==
With no holdings located in archives, Burning Words is considered a lost film.

== Bibliography ==
- Connelly, Robert B. The Silents: Silent Feature Films, 1910-36, Volume 40, Issue 2. December Press, 1998.
- Munden, Kenneth White. The American Film Institute Catalog of Motion Pictures Produced in the United States, Part 1. University of California Press, 1997.
