= Just Nuts =

1915 film

- Directed by: Hal Roach
- Produced by: Hal Roach
- Starring: Harold Lloyd
- Release date: April 19, 1915
- Country: United States
- Languages: Silent; English intertitles

Just Nuts is a 1915 American short comedy film featuring Harold Lloyd playing Willie Work, one of the characters that preceded his glasses character. It is also the only surviving film featuring Lloyd as Willie Work. Prints of the film survive in the film archives at George Eastman House and the Museum of Modern Art.

== Cast ==
- Harold Lloyd as Willie Work
- Jane Novak as The Pretty Girl
- Roy Stewart as Willie's Rival

== See also ==
- Harold Lloyd filmography
