= Trifling with Honor =

1923 film by Harry A. Pollard

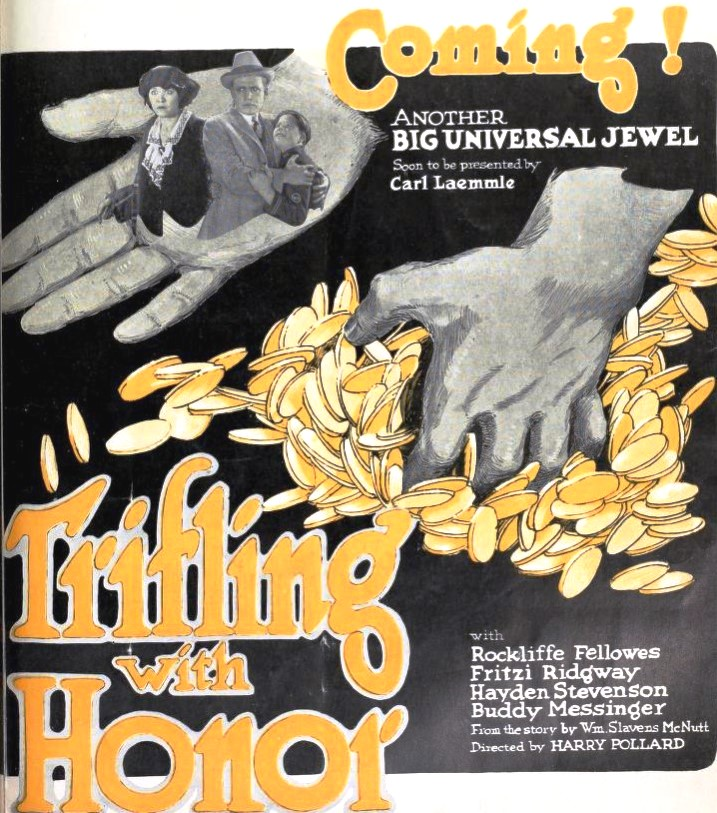
- Trade advertisement
- Directed by: Harry A. Pollard
- Written by: Frank S. Beresford; Raymond L. Schrock (adaptation, scenario)
- Based on: Short story His Good Name by William Slavens McNutt appearing in July 1922 Collier's
- Produced by: Carl Laemmle
- Starring: Rockliffe Fellowes; Fritzi Ridgeway
- Cinematography: Jack Brown
- Distributed by: Universal Pictures
- Release date: May 28, 1923
- Running time: 8 reels
- Country: United States
- Language: Silent (English intertitles)

Trifling with Honor is a 1923 American silent crime drama film directed by Harry A. Pollard and starring Rockliffe Fellowes and Fritzi Ridgeway. It was produced and distributed by Universal Pictures under their Jewel banner. It was also known as His Good Name from the short story source material by William Slavens McNutt.

== Cast ==
- Rockliffe Fellowes as Gas Pipe Kid / Bat Shugrue
- Fritzi Ridgeway as Ida Hunt
- Buddy Messinger as Jimmy Hunt
- Hayden Stevenson as Kelsey Lewis
- Emmett King as Judge Drury
- William Welsh as Warden
- Fred R. Stanton as Lute Clotz (credited as Frederick Stanton)
- William Robert Daly as The Kid's Father
- Jim Farley as Murray Jessop
- Sidney De Gray as Dud Adams
- John Hatton as Jimmy, 8 years old
- Mike Gaffner as Landlord

== Preservation ==
While Trifling with Honor is a lost film, a trailer for this film survives at the Library of Congress.
