= An Aerial Joy Ride =

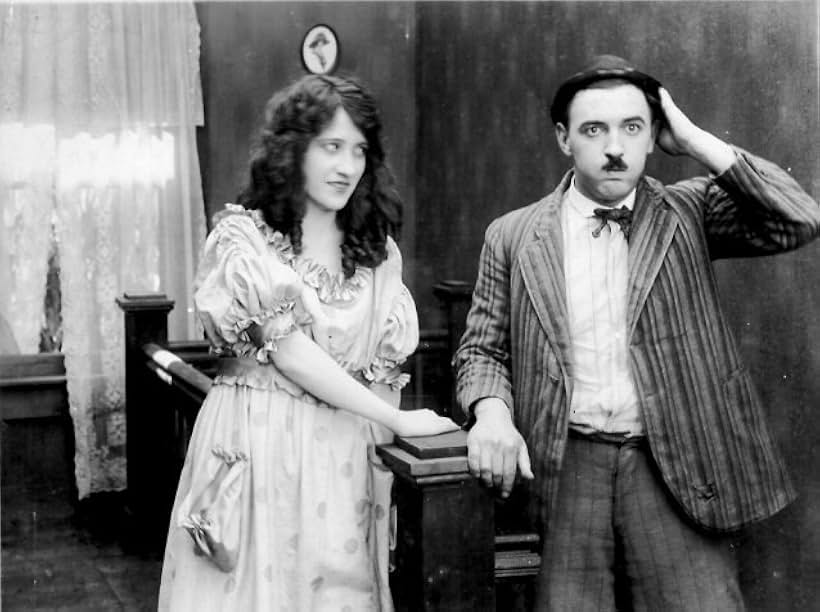
- Directed by: Charles Reed
- Produced by: William Fox
- Starring: Josef Swickard; Annette DeFoe; Raymond Griffith
- Distributed by: Fox
- Release date: 1917
- Running time: 20 minutes
- Country: United States
- Languages: Silent film English intertitles

An Aerial Joy Ride is a 1917 Fox silent comedy, starring Josef Swickard, Annette DeFoe and Raymond Griffith, written and directed by Charles Reed.

== Cast ==
- Josef Swickard - Inventor
- Annette DeFoe - Daughter
- George Utell - Boyfriend (as George Uttal)
- Jack Abbott - Government official
- Harry Moody - Clever crook
- Raymond Griffith - Foolish Crook
