= Willie Runs the Park =

1915 film

- Directed by: Hal Roach
- Produced by: Hal Roach
- Starring: Harold Lloyd
- Cinematography: Walter Lundin
- Music by: Kchaikovsky, Faure, Bach and Wagner
- Release date: February 1915
- Country: United States
- Languages: Silent; English intertitles

Willie Runs the Park is a 1915 American short comedy film featuring Harold Lloyd. It is considered a lost film, as no copies are known to exist.

== Cast ==
- Harold Lloyd as Willie Work
- Jane Novak as The Pretty Girl
- Roy Stewart as Willie's Rival

== See also ==
- Harold Lloyd filmography
