= The Learning of Jim Benton =

1917 film

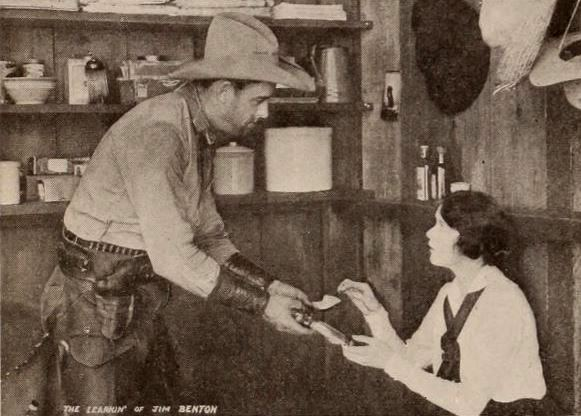
- Directed by: Clifford Smith
- Written by: Alan James
- Produced by: Thomas H. Ince
- Starring: Roy Stewart; Fritzi Ridgeway; Walter Perry
- Cinematography: C.G. Crane
- Production company: Kay-Bee Pictures
- Distributed by: Triangle Distributing
- Release date: December 9, 1917
- Running time: 50 minutes
- Country: United States
- Languages: Silent; English intertitles

The Learning of Jim Benton is a 1917 American silent Western film directed by Clifford Smith and starring Roy Stewart, Fritzi Ridgeway and Walter Perry.

== Cast ==
- Roy Stewart as Jim Benton
- Fritzi Ridgeway as Evelyn Hastings
- Walter Perry as Joe
- Ed Brady as Harvey Knowles
- Thornton Edwards as Sid Harvey

== Synopsis ==
Jim Benton has been too busy making money to learn to read and write, but he persuades Evelyn Hastings to open school on his ranch and he is her most devoted pupil. The sheepmen carry out their threat to cut off Benton's water supply and Evelyn makes him promise to shoot only in self-defense. He keeps his promise, but still he has to kill, and a packed jury of sheepmen bring in a death verdict. The cattlemen attempt a rescue, but it is Evelyn who saves the day.

== Preservation ==
With no holdings located in archives, The Learnin' of Jim Benton is considered a lost film.

== Bibliography ==
- Langman, Larry. A Guide to Silent Westerns. Greenwood Publishing Group, 1992.
