= Lone Hand Wilson =

1920 film

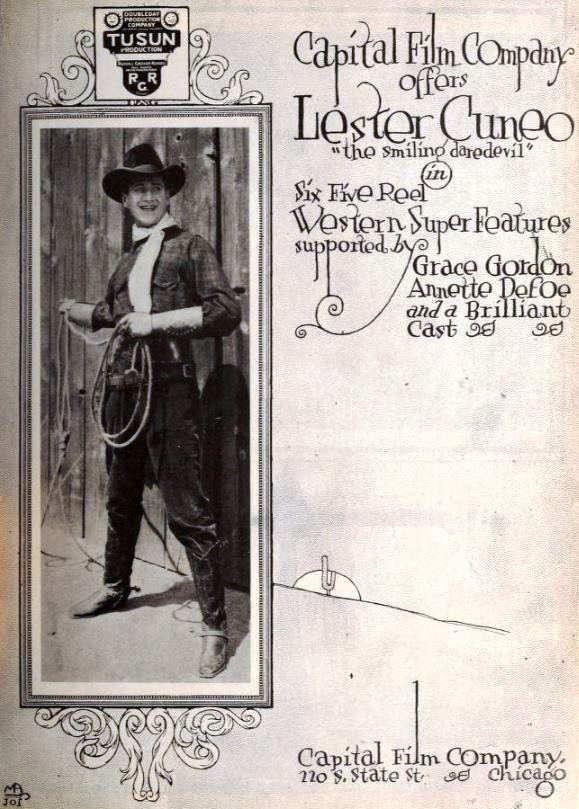
- Advertisement with still from film
- Directed by: Lafe McKee and Harry Moody
- Written by: William Pigott
- Starring: Lester Cuneo; Grace Gordon; Annette DeFoe
- Production company: Lester Cuneo Productions
- Distributed by: Capitol Film Exchange
- Release date: October 1920
- Running time: 5 reels
- Country: United States
- Languages: Silent; English intertitles

Lone Hand Wilson is a 1920 American silent Western film. It stars Lester Cuneo in the title role. Other actors include Annette DeFoe (playing Lolita Hansen) and Thomas Randall.

== Plot ==
The romance of Lone Hand Wilson (Cuneo) with Madge Walker (Gordon) is complicated when he is falsely accused of murdering her father (Gastrock).

== Cast ==
- Lester Cuneo as Lone Hand Wilson
- Grace Gordon as Madge Walker
- Annette DeFoe as Lolita Hansen
- Phil Gastrock as Andy Walker (credited as Philip Gastrock)
- Thomas Randall (Undetermined role)
