= Roy Stewart (silent film actor) =

American actor (1883–1933)

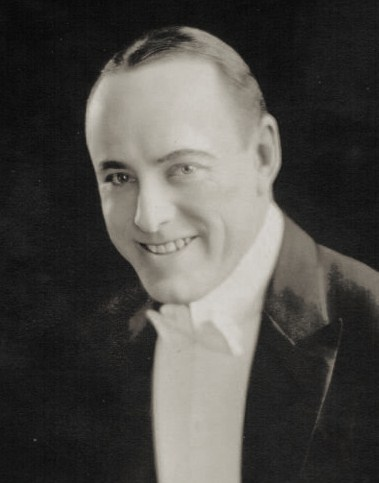
- Stewart, ca. 1920
- Born: October 17, 1883; San Diego, California, US
- Died: April 26, 1933 (aged 49); Los Angeles, California, US
- Occupation: Actor
- Years active: 1915-1933

Roy Stewart (October 17, 1883 – April 26, 1933) was an American actor of the silent era. He appeared in more than 130 films between 1915 and 1933. He was born in San Diego, California. On April 26, 1933, he died at his Westwood, California, home, of a heart attack. He was 49 years old.

== Partial filmography ==
- The Solution to the Mystery (1915)
- The Silver Lining (1915)
- The Substitute Minister (1915)
- The Wasp (1915)
- The Exile of Bar-K Ranch (1915)
- The Diamond from the Sky (1915)
- The Hungry Actors (1915)
- From Italy's Shores (1915)
- Just Nuts (1915)
- Willie Runs the Park (1915)
- The House Built Upon Sand (1916)
- Liberty (1916)
- The Bruiser (1916)
- The Craving (1916)
- The Smugglers of Santa Cruz (1916)
- Mixed Blood (1916)
- The Thoroughbred (1916)
- The Other Side of the Door (1916)
- A Daughter of the Poor (1917)
- The Double Standard (1917)
- The Medicine Man (1917)
- The Boss of the Lazy Y (1917)
- Come Through (1917)
- The Devil Dodger (1917)
- One Shot Ross (1917)
- Follow the Girl (1917)
- The Learning of Jim Benton (1917)
- Bond of Fear (1917)
- The Red-Haired Cupid (1918)
- The Beauty Market (1919)
- The Westerners (1919)
- The U.P. Trail (1920)
- Riders of the Dawn (1920)
- The Devil to Pay (1920)
- Just a Wife (1920)
- The Sagebrusher (1920)
- The Money Changers (1920)
- Prisoners of Love (1921)
- The Mistress of Shenstone (1921)
- A Motion to Adjourn (1921)
- The Innocent Cheat (1921)
- The Heart of the North (1921)
- The Sagebrush Trail (1922)
- The Radio King (1922)
- The Snowshoe Trail (1922)
- Back to Yellow Jacket (1922)
- One Eighth Apache (1922)
- Burning Words (1923)
- Pure Grit (1923)
- Trimmed in Scarlet (1923)
- The Woman on the Jury (1924)
- Sundown (1924)
- Time, the Comedian (1925)
- Where the Worst Begins (1925)
- Sparrows (1926)
- Daniel Boone Thru the Wilderness (1926)
- With Buffalo Bill on the U. P. Trail (1926)
- The Lady from Hell (1926)
- General Custer at the Little Big Horn (1926)
- One Woman to Another (1927)
- Roaring Fires (1927)
- The Viking (1928)
- Stormy Waters (1928)
- The Candy Kid (1928)
- The Great Divide (1929)
- Rough Romance (1930)
- Born Reckless (1930)
- Come on Danger! (1932)
- Come On, Tarzan (1932)
- Exposed (1932)
- Fargo Express (1933)
